= List of songs written by Marius Moga =

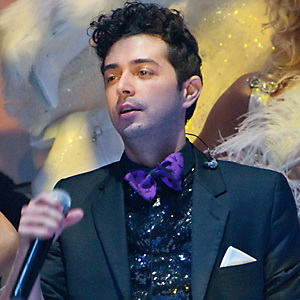
Moga performing in 2011

Romanian singer, songwriter and producer Marius Moga has written songs for himself, his duo Morandi and for other singers. (Note: Moga is credited as a writer by the ASCAP, BMI and UCMR–ADA as Marius Ioan Moga. He has also used the aliases DeMoga and Maxi Mo when composing and releasing music.) He began earning money by writing songs during his teenage years. The first recognition he received was in high school when his band Talk to Me had their song "Noaptea" picked up by several radio stations in his hometown Alba Iulia. His breakthrough came when Romanian group Akcent's founder Adrian Sînă invited him to produce the band's second album when he was 19. The album, titled În culori, for which he wrote every song, was released in January 2002 and received a platinum certification later that year from the Uniunea Producătorilor de Fonograme din România (UPFR).

In September 2004, Moga formed the music duo Morandi alongside Andrei Ropcea and released their debut single, "Love Me", in November, which peaked at number two in Romania. The duo released three albums Reverse (2005), Mind Fields (2006), and N3XT (2007), the latter including the single "Angels (Love Is the Answer)", which reached number one in several countries and received a seven-time platinum certification in Russia. At the 2008 MTV Europe Music Awards, the duo received the award for Best Romanian Act. As a soloist, Moga released his debut single, "Pe barba mea", in May 2014, which reached number one on the Airplay 100 chart.

Throughout his career, Moga has written for numerous mainstream Romanian acts such as Akcent, Andreea Bălan, Anna Lesko and Paula Seling. He co-wrote several songs which topped the Airplay 100 chart including Andra's "Inevitabil va fi bine", Florian Rus and Mira's "Străzile din București" and "Slăbiciuni" by DJ Project featuring Andia. Furthermore, he contributed to and was featured on Guess Who's "Tot mai sus" and Shift's "Sus pe toc", both of which peaked at number one in Romania. He had several unsuccessful attempts at representing Romania at the Eurovision Song Contest for the 2003, 2007, 2008, and 2009 editions. Outside of the Romanian music scene, he has also written songs for international acts like Maroon 5, Train, and Allie X. Aside from his work with various artists, Moga was also involved with composing for the media industry. He wrote songs for the soundtrack albums of Romanian soap operas Iubire ca în filme and Chiquititas, and also wrote and performed the former's ending theme. Additionally, he wrote songs for the soundtracks of the films 7 Seconds and Faci sau taci.

== Songs ==
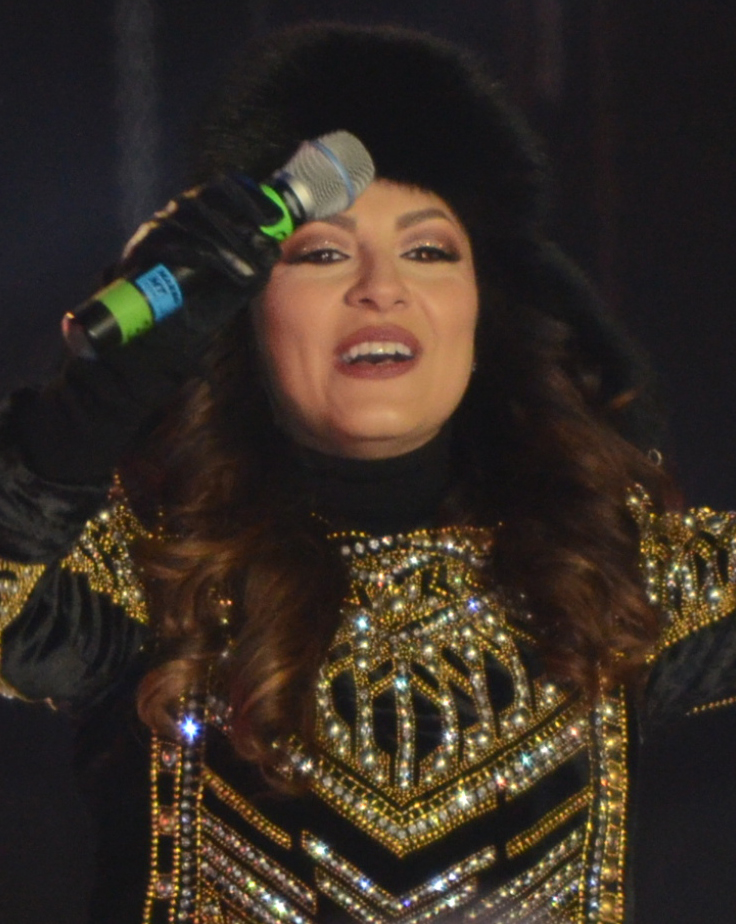
Moga wrote several songs for Andra (pictured), including three singles which topped the Romanian music charts.

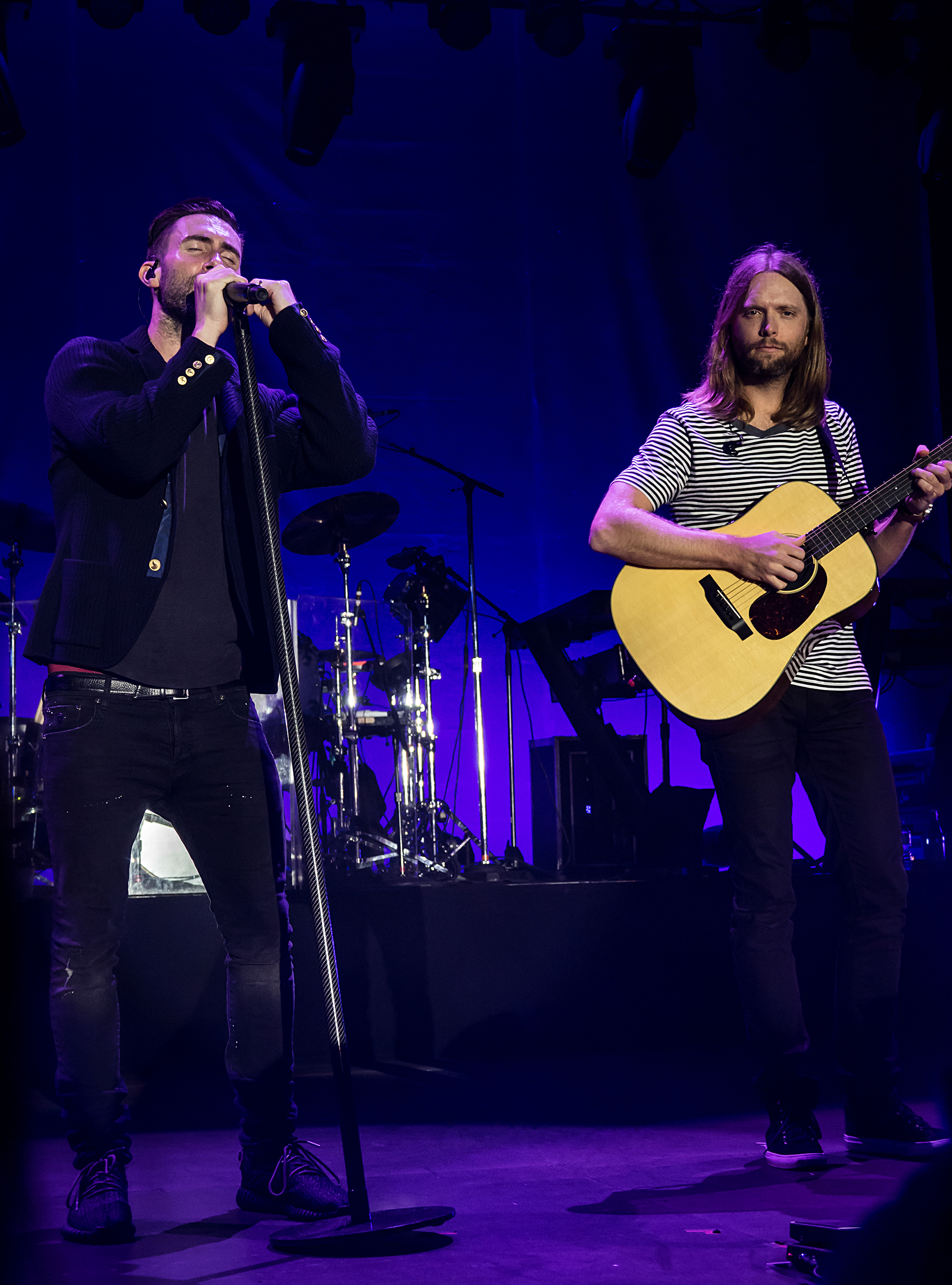
Moga contributed to Maroon 5's (members Adam Levine and James Valentine pictured) "The Man Who Never Lied", which appears on their studio album Overexposed.

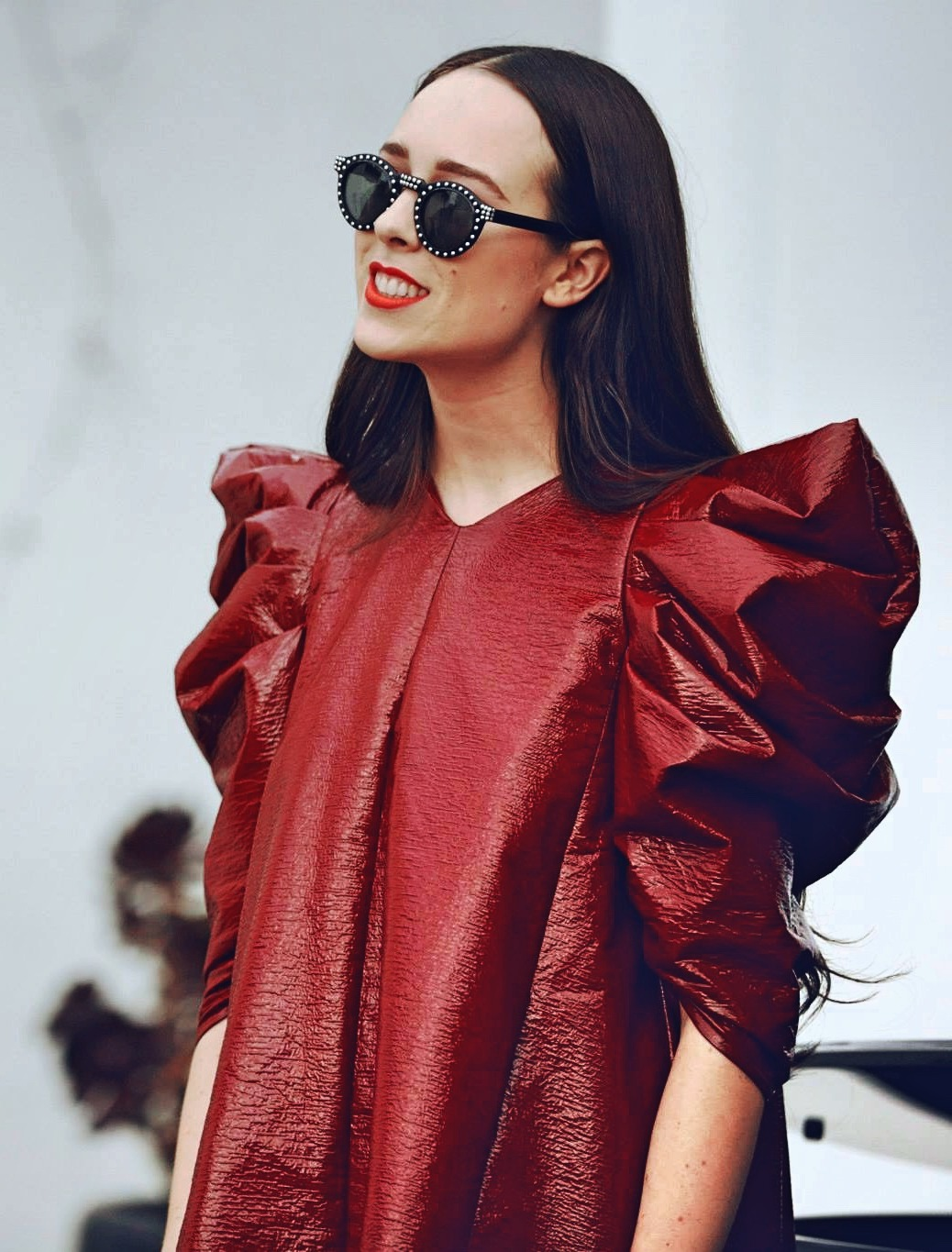
Moga co-wrote two songs for Allie X (pictured).

Key
†	Indicates single release
#	Indicates promotional single release
‡	Indicates song written solely by Moga

Song title, artist, writer(s), album of release, and year of release
Song	Artist(s)	Writer(s)	Album	Year	Ref.
"0721 Akcent"	Akcent	Marius Moga ‡	100 bpm	2003	
"1234 (Unde dragoste nu e)" †	Delia	Gheorghe Gheorghiu; Loredana Căvășdan; Marius Moga; Robert Toma	Deliria	2016	
"2Night"	Alex featuring Matteo	Alex; Marius Moga; Matteo; Smiley	Yamasha	2006	
"A La Lujeba" †	Morandi	Andrei Ropcea; Marius Moga	Mind Fields	2006	
"Adderall"	—	Marius Moga; Max Frost; Richard Conte; Ross Golan; Shiben Bhattacharya; William Loban Bean	—	Unknown	
"Adio"	—	Alexandru Bejenaru; Marius Fulop; Marius Moga; Razvan Munteanu; Tibor Aranyi; Vicentiu Ghergulov; Vladimir Pocorschi	—	2016	
"Adios Amor" †	Amna	Andreea Mușat; Loredana Căvășdan; Marius Moga; Robert Toma	—	2015	
"Ai grijă de femeia ta" †	Marius Moga with Smiley	Andrei Maria; Marius Moga; Serban Cazan; Vlad Popescu	—	2019	
"Afrika" †	Morandi	Andrei Ropcea; Marius Moga	N3XT	2007	
"Ai ceva"	Corina	Marius Moga; Smiley	Îmi place...tot!	2005	
"Ajutor" †	Anda Adam	Marius Moga; Sebastian Zsemlye	Confidențial	2005	
"Al nouălea cer"	Anda Adam	Andrei Ropcea; Marius Moga; Smiley	Confidențial	2005	
"Alege"	Cream	Marius Moga; Oxi	48 de ore	2006	
"Alfabetul" #	DeMoga Kids	Marius Moga ‡	—	2018	
"Allemasse" †	Lukone featuring DeMoga	Marius Moga ‡	—	2011	
"Altă viață"	Andra	Marius Moga; Mihai Raoul	Vreau sărutarea ta	2003	
"Am Bani de Dat (Tengo dinero)" †	Smiley featuring Alex, Don Baxter and Marius Moga	Alexandru Velea; Andrei Maria; Marius Moga; Sergiu Istrati	În lipsa mea	2008	
"Am grijă de noi" †	Adda	Adda; Marius Mirică; Marius Moga	—	2017	
"American Dream"	Simplu featuring Dan Teodorescu	Dan Teodorescu; Marius Moga; Smiley	Oficial îmi merge bine	2007	
"Amore"	Morandi	Andrei Ropcea; Marius Moga	Reverse	2005	
"Angel"	—	Jason Nevins; Marius Moga; Samantha Nelson-Gums	—	Unknown	
"Angels (Love Is the Answer)" †	Morandi	Andrei Ropcea; Marius Moga	N3XT	2007	
"Ani de liceu 2002"	TNT	Florin Bogardo; Florin Grozea; Marius Moga; Sasa Georgescu	Exploziv	2002	
"Another Break Up"	—	Amie Miriello; Marius Moga	—	Unknown	
"Any Chance to Win"	—	Marius Moga; Samantha Castel	—	Unknown	
"Aparențe" †	Andreea Bălan	Marius Moga ‡	Așa sunt eu!	2004	
"Ard în flăcări"	Anna Lesko	Bogdan Popoiag; Marius Moga; Zoia Alecu	Flăcări	2002	
"Arme" †	Amna featuring What's Up	Alexandra Moldovan; Catalin Moldoveanu; Marius Ivancea; Marius Moga; Ovidiu Stanescu	—	2013	
"Asta e!"	TNT	Bogdan Popoiag; Dan Badea; Marius Moga	Exploziv	2002	
"Asta sunt eu" †	Lidia Buble featuring What's Up	Florian Rus; Marius Ivancea; Marius Moga	—	2019	
"Așa e dragostea" †	Andra featuring Liviu Teodorescu	Gabriel Istrate; Ionuț Vasilache; Liviu Teodorescu; Loredana Căvășdan; Marius Moga; Mădălin Roşioru; Robert Toma	—	2014	
"Așa cum îl visam"	Cream	Marius Moga; Oxi; Smiley	48 de ore	2006	
"Atâta timp cât mă iubești" †	Andra featuring Marius Moga	Fely Donose; Gabriel Istrate; Marius Ivancea; Marius Moga	—	2013	
"Autobronzant" †	Corina	David Ciente; Gabriel Istrate; Larisa Borza; Marius Moga; Sergiu Musteata	—	2014	
"Avioane de hârtie" †	Shift featuring Andra	Gabriel Istrate; Marius Moga	—	2015	
"Ay Guapito" †	Bella Santiago	Bella Santiago; Cristian Tarcea; Marius Moga; Mark Azekko	—	2021	
"Azi plâng numai eu"	Akcent	Marius Moga ‡	100 bpm	2003	
"Ăsta nu sunt eu"	Cătălin Josan	Cătălin Josan; Marius Moga; Mihai Coporan	MegaStart	2007	
"B Boy Crew"	Simplu	Marius Moga; Simplu	Zece	2003	
"Baby" (Note: Samples "Ice Ice Baby" by Vanilla Ice)	Akcent	Adrian Sînă; Brian May; David Bowie; Floyd Brown; Freddie Mercury; John Deacon; Mario Johnson; Marius Moga; Robert Van Winkle; Roger Taylor	King of Disco	2007	
"Bairam"	Anda Adam	Marius Moga ‡	Queen of Hearts	2008	
"Banii vorbesc"	Simplu with Holograf	Holograf; Marius Moga	Oficial îmi merge bine	2007	
"Bate, bate" †	Alexandra Ungureanu featuring Marius Moga	Liviu Teodorescu; Loredana Căvășdan; Marius Moga	—	2018	
"Beautiful Disaster"	Ryan Beatty	Marius Moga; Ryan Beatty	—	Unknown	
"Beijo (Uh-La-La)" †	Morandi	Andrei Ropcea; Marius Moga	Reverse	2005	
"Believe in Your Love"	—	Marius Moga ‡	—	2006	
"Big Brown Eyes" †	Cătălin Josan featuring Maria Marinescu	Marius Moga; Sergiu Istrati	MegaStart	2007	
"Bine" †	What's Up	Gabriel Istrate; Marius Ivancea; Marius Moga	—	2015	
"Blue"	Morandi	Marius Moga ‡	Reverse	2005	
"Boca de Inferno" †	Sistem	Andreea Crepcia; Marius Moga	—	2009	
"Break Beat 2CO4"	Simplu	Marius Moga; Simplu; Smiley	Zece	2003	
"Buchet de trandafiri" †	Akcent	Marius Moga ‡	100 bpm	2003	
"By Your Side"	Morandi	Andrei Maria; Andrei Ropcea; Marius Moga	Reverse	2005	
"Can I Touch"	Morandi	Andrei Ropcea; Marius Moga	Reverse	2005	
"Can't Say No"	—	Amie Miriello; Marius Moga	—	Unknown	
"Carnival"	—	Amie Miriello; Carlos John; Marius Moga	—	Unknown	
"Căzut din cer"	Candy	Marius Moga ‡	De vis	2002	
"Când sunt cu tine" †	Alex featuring Mandinga	Marius Moga ‡	Gozaló! / Yamasha	2006	
"Când vine noaptea"	Florian Rus	Bogdan Todor; Florian Rus; Ionuț Vasilache; Marius Moga	Străzile din București	2019	
"Când vine seara"	Akcent	Akcent; Marius Moga	100 bpm	2003	
"Cântec pentru fizzoși"	Cream	Andrei Ropcea; Marius Moga; Smiley	Te vreau...	2005	
"Cântecul inimii" †	Cream	Marius Moga ‡	48 de ore	2006	
"Cât despre sport"	Simplu	Marius Moga; Simplu	Zece	2003	
"Ce e dragostea?"	Ștefan Bănică Jr.	Marius Ivancea; Marius Moga; Ștefan Bănică Jr.	Altceva	2012	
"Ce n-aș da"	Alex	Alex; Marius Moga; Smiley	Yamasha	2006	
"Ce ți-aș face (Selecta)" †	Anda Adam featuring Alex	Alexandru Velea; Marius Moga	Confidențial	2005	
"Ce zodie ești?"	Delia	Adrian Klein; Alex Parker; Florian Rus; Loredana Căvășdan; Marius Moga; Robert Toma	Deliria	2016	
"Cea mai tare piesă"	Smiley featuring Don Baxter	Andrei Maria; Marius Moga; Sergiu Istrati	În lipsa mea	2008	
"Cel mai dulce cadou"	Akcent	Marius Moga; Silviu Dimitriu-Aurelian	În culori	2002	
"Chichiricheanga"	Corina	Andrei Ropcea; Marius Moga	Îmi place...tot!	2005	
"Chico Rico"	Mandinga	Marius Moga ‡	Donde	2008	
"Chip angelic"	Simplu	Marius Moga ‡	Oficial îmi merge bine	2007	
"Cine e cine e"	—	Marius Moga ‡	—	2020	
"Cine ești tu pentru mine?" †	Cristian Sanda featuring Jo	Adrian Radu; Alin Sterian; Cristian Sanda; Marius Moga	—	2017	
"Colors" †	Morandi	Andrei Ropcea; Marius Moga	—	2009	
"Come Home..."	Morandi	Andrei Ropcea; Marius Moga	Mind Fields	2006	
"Come This Way"	Zero featuring Marius Moga	Marius Moga ‡	Sunny Days	2009	
"Crazy"	Morandi with Wassabi	Andrei Ropcea; Marius Moga	—	2007	
"Crazy World"	Morandi	Andrei Ropcea; Marius Moga	Mind Fields	2006	
"Cupidon" †	Guess Who featuring Irina Rimes	Guess Who; Marius Moga	Un anonim celebru	2017	
"Curaj" †	Adela Popescu featuring Sorana	Marius Moga; Mădălin Roşioru; Robert Toma; Sorana Păcurar	—	2015	
"Dă-mi un tel"	Akcent	Marius Moga ‡	În culori	2002	
"Daleh Cumnaleh"	Morandi	Andrei Ropcea; Marius Moga	Mind Fields	2006	
"De ai fi un cântec..."	Smiley featuring Marius Moga	Marius Moga; Mihai Coporan	În lipsa mea	2008	
"De câte x vrei tu" †	Amna	Florian Rus; Loredana Căvășdan; Marius Moga	—	2018	
"De ce ne îndrăgostim" †	Alina Eremia	Florian Chiosea; Ionuț Vasilache; Liviu Teodorescu; Marius Moga; Robert Toma	360	2017	
"Departe de tine"	Akcent	Antonella Muraru; Marius Moga	În culori	2002	
"Designed to Love You" †	Smiley	Andrei Maria; Marius Moga; Sergiu Istrati	În lipsa mea	2008	
"Dimineața"	Cream	Marius Moga ‡	48 de ore	2006	
"Do the Tango with Me"	Wassabi	Marius Moga ‡	—	2007	
"Doar o noapte" †	Blondy	Bogdan Popoiag; Dan Griober; Marius Moga	O parte din tine	2002	
"Doar tu o ai"	Corina	Marius Moga ‡	Face Off	2006	
"Doare" †	What's Up	Marius Ivancea; Marius Moga	—	2018	
"Don't Look Back"	Morandi	Andrei Ropcea; Marius Moga	N3XT	2007	
"Doorbell Idea"	—	Alexandra Hughes; Marius Moga; Michael Wise	—	Unknown	
"Dor de ea" †	Liviu Teodorescu	Liviu Teodorescu; Marius Moga	—	2016	
"Dor de tine, dor de noi" †	Hi-Q	Dana Nălbaru; Florin Grozea; Marius Moga	Pentru prieteni	2002	
"Două clipe de iubire"	Cream	Andrei Ropcea; Marius Moga; Smiley	Te vreau...	2005	
"Down Down"	Anda Adam	Anthony Valentino; Marius Moga	Queen of Hearts	2008	
"Dracula, My Love"	Andra featuring Simplu	Andrei Maria; Eduard Andreianu; Marius Moga	Dragostea rămâne	2007	
"Draga mea..."	Simplu	Marius Moga; Simplu	Zece	2003	
"Dragostea doare"	Anda Adam	Marius Moga ‡	Confidențial	2005	
"Drama" †	Matteo featuring Ruby	Marius Mirică; Marius Moga; Matei Vasiliu	Panama	2018	
"Dulce pentru tine"	Corina	Marius Moga; Mihai Coporan; Sebastian Szemlye; Smiley	Îmi place...tot!	2005	
"Durere fără sfârșit"	Akcent	Marius Moga ‡	100 bpm	2003	
"E ok!"	Hi-Q	Dan Badea; Florin Grozea; Marius Moga	O mare de dragoste	2004	
"E viața mea"	Corina	Marius Moga; Mihai Coporan	Îmi place...tot!	2005	
"Electronic Symphony" †	Lukone featuring DeMoga and Liviu Teodorescu	Marius Moga ‡	—	2012	
"Empty Soul"	Andra	Marius Moga ‡	Iubeşte-mă azi, iubeşte-mă mâine	2009	
"Endless Love"	Morandi	Andrei Ropcea; Marius Moga	Mind Fields	2006	
"English Teasing"	Anda Adam	Marius Moga ‡	Queen of Hearts	2008	
"Ești piesa" †	Liviu Teodorescu	Liviu Teodorescu; Marius Moga	—	2014	
"Everything I Needed" †	Feenixpawl featuring Strange Talk	Aden Forte; Gerard Sidhu; Joshua Soon; Marius Moga; Stephen Docker	—	2013	
"Everything We Do"	Buppy featuring Marius Moga and Don Baxter	Lennox Brown; Marius Moga	Universal Reggae Menu, Vol. 1	2006	
"Everytime We Touch" †	Morandi	Andrei Ropcea; Marius Moga; Serban Cazan	—	2013	
"Eviți să iubești" †	Adela Popescu	Marius Moga ‡	Iubire ca în filme	2006	
"Ezayem"	Morandi	Andrei Ropcea; Marius Moga	Mind Fields	2006	
"Falling Asleep (Losing My Baby)" †	Morandi	Andrei Ropcea; Marius Moga	Mind Fields	2006	
"Fă ce vrei"	TNT	Florin Grozea; Marius Moga	Exploziv	2002	
"Fără aer" †	Amna featuring Adda	Adda; Amna; Liviu Teodorescu; Marius Moga; Mădălin Roşioru; Robert Toma; What's Up	—	2014	
"Fără gheață nu e viață"	TNT featuring Marius Moga	Dan Badea; Dan Griober; Marius Moga	Exploziv	2002	
"Fără grabă! (Ne iubim o noapte)"	Simplu	Marius Moga; Simplu	Zece	2003	
"Fără tine"	Corina	Marius Moga; Smiley	Îmi place...tot!	2005	
"Fernando" †	Corina	Bogdan Beciu; Corina Bud; Marius Moga; Mădălin Roşioru; Nelide Popa; Sever Staicu; Teodor Pogorevici	—	2017	
"Fill Me up Inside"	Morandi	Andrei Ropcea; Marius Moga	Mind Fields	2006	
"Fire Is Catching"	Ryan Beatty	Marius Moga; Ryan Beatty	—	Unknown	
"Frontline"	—	Jason Mater; Marius Moga	—	Unknown	
"Frozen Flower"	—	Brandon Rogers; Jason Mater; Marius Moga	—	Unknown	
"Geamantan" †	Jorge featuring Pavel Stratan	Marius Moga ‡	—	2013	
"Geometry"	—	Frederik Haggstam; Johan Gustafsson; Marius Moga; Sebastian Lundberg	—	Unknown	
"Get High"	Morandi featuring Helene	Elena Moroșanu; Marius Moga	N3XT	2007	
"Good at One Thing"	Ryan Beatty	Marius Moga; Ryan Beatty	—	Unknown	
"Hai/Bye" †	Simplu	Alexandru Vaceff; Andrei Maria; Eduard Andreianu; Marius Moga	Oare ştii...	2002	
"Hands Up"	—	Brandon Rogers; Jason Mater; Marius Moga	—	Unknown	
"Hello"	Allie X	Alexandra Hughes; Marius Moga; Michael Wise	CollXtion I	2015	
"Hello"	Giulia	Marius Moga ‡	Giulia	2004	
"Hello Goodbye"	Morandi	Andrei Maria; Marius Moga	Mind Fields	2006	
"Hey, Cowboy!" †	Diana Brescan featuring Dorian Popa	Achi; Florian Rus; Marius Moga; Mădălin Roşioru	—	2018	
"Hiding from the Sun"	Morandi	Andrei Ropcea; Marius Moga	N3XT	2007	
"Hip-Hop (Stil de viață)"	Simplu	Alexandru Vaceff; Andrei Maria; Eduard Andreianu; Marius Moga	Oare ştii...	2002	
"Hold On" †	Adrian Sînă	Adrian Sînă; Marius Moga	—	2010	
"Home Alone (Macaulay Culkin)" #	Alex Parker with Alexandra Stan	Alex Parker; Marius Moga	—	2021	
"Hooked on You"	—	Erik Lewander; Marius Moga; Ylva Dimberg	—	Unknown	
"Hope"	—	Andrei Ropcea; Marius Moga	—	2011	
"Hot"	Morandi featuring Loredana	Loredana Groza; Marius Moga; Mihai Coporan	Reverse	2005	
"How Deep Is Your Love" (Note: "How Deep Is Your Love" was initially released as a single by Akcent on 30 September 2009. It was later reworked as "Love Stoned".)	LaViVe	Adrian Sînă; Marius Moga	No Sleep	2010	
"I Believe in This Life" †	Jermaine Paul	Greg Holden; Jason Nevins; Joe Friedman; Marius Moga	—	2012	
"I Belong to You"	Morandi	Andrei Maria; Andrei Ropcea; Marius Moga	Mind Fields	2006	
"I Miss Love"	—	Andrei Ropcea; Marius Moga	—	2011	
"I Want You Back"	Marius Moga	Marius Moga ‡	—	2006	
"I Wrote This One for You"	Ryan Beatty	Marius Moga; Ryan Beatty	—	Unknown	
"I'm into You"	—	Andrei Ropcea; Marius Moga	—	2011	
"Ia-mă lângă tine"	Corina	Marius Moga; Sebastian Szemlye	Îmi place...tot!	2005	
"Iar e toamnă"	Impact	Cristina Haios; Marius Moga; Rareș Timiș	Clipe	2003	
"Iartă-mă, mamă" †	What's Up	Marius Ivancea; Marius Moga	—	2018	
"Indiferența" †	Andra	Ciprenko; Florian Rus; Loredana Căvășdan; Marius Mirică; Marius Moga; Paul Ballo	—	2018	
"Inevitabil va fi bine" †	Andra	Ciprian Alexandru; Marius Ivancea; Marius Moga	Inevitabil va fi bine	2013	
"Inimi SRL" †	Hi-Q featuring Junior High	Marius Moga ‡	—	2013	
"Iubește-mă..."	Andreea Bălan	Marius Moga; Mihai Coporan	Așa sunt eu!	2004	
"Iubește-mă acum"	Cream	Marius Moga; Mihai Coporan	Te vreau...	2005	
"Iubește-mă bine" †	Blondy	Bogdan Popoiag; Dan Griober; Marius Moga	O parte din tine	2002	
"Iubirea mea" †	Loredana	Loredana; Marius Moga	My Love	2006	
"Iubire ca în filme" †	Adela Popescu	Marius Moga ‡	Iubire ca în filme	2006	
"Îmi place la tine tot" †	Corina	Don Baxter; Marius Moga; Smiley	Îmi place...tot!	2005	
"Îmi place trupul tău"	Simplu	Marius Moga ‡	Oficial îmi merge bine	2007	
"În brațele tale" †	Liviu Teodorescu	Ionuț Vasilache; Liviu Teodorescu; Marius Moga; Mădălin Roşioru; Robert Toma	—	2015	
"În culori" †	Akcent	Marius Moga ‡	În culori	2002	
"În fiecare zi"	Hi-Q	Florin Grozea; Marius Moga	Pentru prieteni	2002	
"În Lipsa Mea" †	Smiley featuring Uzzi	Andrei Maria; Marius Moga; Uzzi	În lipsa mea	2007	
"În oglindă" †	Amna featuring Robert Toma	Liviu Teodorescu; Marius Moga; Mădălin Roşioru; Robert Toma	—	2015	
"Închide ochii" †	Cream featuring Marius Moga	Chucho; Marius Moga; Smiley	Aștept...	2003	
"Îngerii"	Andra	Ada Rizea; Adrian Klein; Marius Moga; Mădălin Roşioru; What's Up	Iubirea schimbă tot	2017	
"Îngerul meu"	Impact	Florin Pop; Marius Moga; Rareș Timiș	Clipe	2003	
"Înghețată" †	Yogi featuring Ruby and Shift	Antonio Anghel; Gabriel Istrate; Marius Moga	—	2014	
"Întinde-te pe canapea"	Corina	Marius Moga ‡	Îmi place...tot!	2005	
"Îți mai aduci aminte" †	Andreea Bălan featuring Uddi	Dragos Udila; Eugen Mihaescu; Marius Moga; Robert Toma	—	2017	
"Îți mulțumesc"	Alex	Marius Moga; Smiley	Yamasha	2006	
"Jumătatea ta"	Simplu	Marius Moga; Simplu	Zece	2003	
"Jurnalul unei fete"	Alex	Marius Moga; Smiley	Yamasha	2006	
"K la meteo" †	What's Up featuring Andra	Marius Ivancea; Marius Moga	Inevitabil va fi bine	2012	
"Kalinka" †	Morandi	Andrei Ropcea; Marius Moga; Theea Miculescu	—	2018	
"Kboom" †	CRBL featuring Helen	Eduard Andreianu; Marius Moga	Ce-avem noi aici?!	2011	
"Keep You Safe" †	Morandi	Andrei Ropcea; Marius Moga	—	2016	
"Kings of the Night"	—	Alexandra Tamposi; Brian Kennedy; Marius Moga; Olivia Waithe	—	Unknown	
"La mulți ani" †	What's Up featuring DeMoga Music	Marius Moga ‡	—	2013	
"La refren"	Andra	Adrian Klein; Marius Moga; Vlad Vedes	Iubirea schimbă tot	2017	
"Labirint de sentimente" †	Narcotic Sound with Christian D	Ada Moldovan; Cristian Dumitrescu; Gabriel Istrate; Marius Mirică; Marius Moga	—	2015	
"Lacrimi pentru tine"	Delia	Marius Moga ‡	Listen Up!	2007	
"LaLa Song" †	Grasu XXL featuring Guess Who	C!prenko; Grasu XXL; Guess Who; Marius Moga	—	2011	
"Lângă tine"	Cream featuring Randi	Don Baxter; Marius Moga; Smiley	48 de ore	2006	
"Leagă-mă la ochi" †	Blaxy Girls	Aida Sotea; Ionuț Vasilache; Lavinia Dalea; Marius Moga; Ovidiu Stanescu	—	2014	
"Let's Go Take It Straight"	Paula Seling	Andrew Klein; Marius Moga	—	2003	
"Let's Talk About It"	Akcent	Adrian Sînă; Marius Moga; Marius Nedelcu	King of Disco	2007	
"Liberă din nou" †	Andreea Bălan	Dan Griober; Marius Moga	Liberă din nou	2002	
"Lifted"	Allie X	Alexandra Hughes; Marius Moga; Matthew Frost; Michael Wise	CollXtion II	2017	
"Limelight"	—	Bjorn Olovsson; Jennifer Decilveo; Joakim Olovsson; Marius Moga	—	Unknown	
"Living Without You" †	Morandi	Andrei Ropcea; Marius Moga	—	2014	
"Love, I'm Ready Now"	—	Alex Gaudino; Marius Moga	—	Unknown	
"Love Is Tickling"	Morandi	Andrei Ropcea; Dragu Constantin; Marius Moga	N3XT	2007	
"Love Me" †	Morandi	Andrei Ropcea; Marius Moga	Reverse	2004	
"Love Stoned" †	Akcent	Adrian Sînă; Marius Moga	—	2010	
"Love Was Never Her Friend"	Dalma	Marius Moga ‡	—	2009	
"Love Will Come" †	Luminița Anghel	Marius Moga ‡	—	2006	
"Loving Is All"	—	George Horga; Jason Mater; Marius Moga	—	Unknown	
"Loz în plic"	Simplu	Marius Moga; Simplu	Zece	2003	
"Lumea visează" †	Unu' with Alexandra	Bogdan Popoiag; Dan Griober; Marius Moga	Unu'	2002	
"M-am certat cu inima"	Corina	Marius Moga ‡	Îmi place...tot!	2005	
"M-am îndrăgostit"	Cream	Marius Moga ‡	48 de ore	2006	
"Mă doare la bass" †	Marius Moga featuring Shift and What's Up	Gabriel Istrate; George Hora; Marius Ivancea; Marius Moga; Vizi Imre	—	2018	
"Made in Romanie" †	Loredana	Connect-R; Loredana; Marius Moga; Smiley	Made in Romanie	2007	
"Magic Love"	Andreea Bănică	Marius Moga ‡	Rendez-Vous	2007	
"Mai dulce" †	Hi-Q	Dan Badea; Florin Grozea; Marius Moga	O mare de dragoste	2003	
"Mai stai"	Cream	Marius Moga; Mihai Coporan	Te vreau...	2005	
"Make This Love Come True"	Alexandra Ungureanu	Marius Moga ‡	—	2003	
"Măcar"	Akcent	Marius Moga ‡	În culori	2002	
"Me and This Girl"	—	Amie Miriello; Marius Moga	—	Unknown	
"Mi-ai luat mințile" †	Andra featuring Pacha Man	Marian Moldoveanu; Marius Mirică; Marius Moga; Pacha Man; Theea Miculescu	—	2017	
"Mi-e greu"	TNT	Eduard Alexandru; Marius Moga	Exploziv	2002	
"Mi-ești dragă"	Akcent	Bogdan Popoiag; Marius Moga	100 bpm	2003	
"Midnight Train" †	Morandi	Andrei Ropcea; Marius Moga	—	2011	
"Mikala"	Morandi	Andrei Ropcea; Marius Moga; Mihai Toma	Mind Fields	2006	
"Mindfields"	Morandi	Marius Moga ‡	Mind Fields	2006	
"Miroase a vară" †	Kio featuring What's Up	Marius Ivancea; Marius Moga; Stefan Simbotin	—	2014	
"Miss Boboc" †	Corina featuring Junior High	Ionuț Vasilache; Marius Mirică; Marius Moga; Mircea Pavilcu; Robert Toma	—	2013	
"Moş Crăciun" #	DeMoga Music	Marius Moga ‡	—	2020	
"Move Your Body"	Andra	Marius Moga ‡	Dragostea rămâne	2008	
"Mr. DJ"	—	Elena Morosanu; Marius Moga	—	2011	
"Mr. Originality" †	Simplu	Marius Moga; Smiley	Oficial îmi merge bine	2007	
"Musica Mi Libertad"	Morandi featuring Corina Chiriac	Andrei Ropcea; Corina Chiriac; Marius Moga	N3XT	2007	
"My Home Is You"	—	Marius Moga; Oscar Engstrom	—	Unknown	
"N-am să uit niciodată"	Simplu	Marius Moga; Simplu	Zece	2003	
"N3XT"	Morandi featuring Fajra Amira	Andrei Ropcea; Marius Moga	N3XT	2007	
"Nai, nai" †	Anda Adam featuring Bishop	Bishop; Marius Moga; Mihai Coporan	Confidențial	2005	
"Naked Soul" †	Loredana	Loredana; Marius Moga; Mihai Coporan	My Love	2005	
"Nici o zi fără tine"	Akcent	Marius Moga ‡	În culori	2002	
"Niciodată să nu spui niciodată" †	Andra featuring Cabron	Andi Grasu; Cabron; Marius Moga; Mădălin Roşioru; Robert Toma; Shift; What's Up	Iubirea schimbă tot	2015	
"Noaptea"	Talk to Me	Marius Moga ‡	—	Unknown	
"Noi doi" †	Corina featuring Pacha Man, Marius Moga and Smiley	Marius Moga; Mihai Coporan; Smiley	Îmi place...tot!	2005	
"Nothing More to Say"	Cătălin Josan	Marius Moga ‡	MegaStart	2007	
"Nu am cu cine"	Red Blonde	Marius Moga ‡	—	2009	
"Nu cred în povești"	Andreea Bălan	Dan Badea; Dan Griober; Marius Moga	Liberă din nou	2002	
"Nu din prima seară" †	Cream featuring CRBL	Marius Moga; Mihai Coporan	Te vreau...	2005	
"Nu mă mai iubeşti"	Andreea Bănică	Marius Moga; Mihai Coporan	Rendez-Vous	2007	
"Nu pleca"	Fuego	Marius Moga ‡	Olé Ola	2001	
"Nu pune la suflet" †	Ruby featuring What's Up	Ionuț Vasilache; Marius Ivancea; Marius Moga	—	2015	
"Nu refuza dragostea"	Akcent	Marius Moga ‡	100 bpm	2003	
"Nu te pot ierta"	Alina	Marius Moga ‡	Vrei altceva	2002	
"O dorință" †	Marius Moga	Marius Mirică; Marius Moga	—	2022	
"O ploaie de lacrimi"	Akcent	Marius Moga ‡	100 bpm	2003	
"O rază de iubire"	Akcent	Marius Moga ‡	100 bpm	2003	
"O secundă"	Simplu	Marius Moga; Simplu	Zece	2003	
"O străină" †	Andreea Bălan	Andreea Bălan; Marius Moga	Așa sunt eu!	2004	
"Oare ştii" †	Simplu	Alexandru Vaceff; Andrei Maria; Eduard Andreianu; Marius Moga; Miruna Doicaru	Oare ştii...	2002	
"Ochii mei" †	Anda Adam	Marius Moga; Smiley	Confidențial	2005	
"Ochii tăi"	Corina	Marius Moga ‡	Îmi place...tot!	2005	
"Oficial îmi merge bine" †	Simplu	CRBL; Don Baxter; Marius Moga; Smiley	Oficial îmi merge bine	2007	
"Oh My God (Superfly)"	Morandi	Andrei Ropcea; Marius Moga	N3XT	2007	
"One in a Million"	Andra	Marius Moga ‡	Dragostea rămâne	2008	
"Only Human"	—	Andrei Ropcea; Marius Moga	—	2011	
"Oops...eroare!" †	Andreea Bălan	Marius Moga ‡	Așa sunt eu!	2004	
"Opriți planeta"	Anda Adam	Anthony Valentino; Marius Moga	Queen of Hearts	2008	
"Orice minut"	Alex featuring Byga	Alex; Andrei Ropcea; Byga; Marius Moga; Smiley	Yamasha	2006	
"Origami"	—	Carlos Reyes; Catalin Moldoveanu; Eberhard Papp; Franklin Martinez; Gil Corber; Ioana Miculescu; Marcos Perez; Marius Moga; Raymond Guevara	—	Unknown	
"Panda Madam" †	Anda Adam	Marius Moga ‡	Amo	2011	
"Party haos poc" †	Adda featuring What's Up	Marius Moga ‡	—	2013	
"Pe barba mea" †	Marius Moga	Marius Moga ‡	—	2014	
"Pe buzele tale" †	Florian Rus	Ana-Maria Stefan; Bogdan Todor; Denis Gavrilescu; Florian Rus; Ionuț Vasilache; Marius Moga; Mihnea Sechely	Străzile din București	2019	
"Pe drum"	Simplu with Don Baxter and Marius Moga	Don Baxter; Marius Moga; Smiley	Oficial îmi merge bine	2007	
"Pe limba mea"	Adela Popescu	Marius Moga ‡	Iubire ca în filme	2006	
"Pe unde îți umblă inima"	Smiley	Andrei Maria; Marius Moga	În lipsa mea	2008	
"Perfect"	Alex	Baxter; Marius Moga; Smiley	Yamasha	2006	
"Petre" †	CRBL featuring Adda	Ada Moldovan; Eduard Andreianu; Gabriel Huiban; Marius Moga	Ce-avem noi aici?!	2012	
"Piesa noastră"	Refflex	Marius Moga ‡	Refflex	2004	
"Plâng de dor" †	Andreea Bălan	Andreea Bălan; Eduard Alexandru; Marius Moga	Liberă din nou	2002	
"Plâng, plâng, plâng"	Andreea Antonescu	Marius Moga ‡	Când dansam	2003	
"Pleacă din viața mea"	—	Marius Moga ‡	—	2001	
"Pot eu să te urăsc?" †	Angelo featuring Nicole Cherry	Alex Parker; Angelo Simionica; Marius Moga	—	2015	
"Povești" †	Sorana	Marius Moga ‡	—	2015	
"Prea departe"	Hi-Q	Florin Grozea; Marius Moga	Pentru prieteni	2002	
"Prea târziu"	Andreea Antonescu	Marius Moga ‡	Când dansam	2003	
"Preocupat Cu Gura Ta" †	Smiley	Andrei Maria; Marius Moga	În lipsa mea	2008	
"Prietene false"	Cream	Marius Moga; Smiley	48 de ore	2006	
"Prima iubire" †	Akcent	Marius Moga ‡	În culori	2002	
"Prima oară"	—	Marius Moga ‡	—	2001	
"Prințul Blu"	Loredana	Loredana; Marius Moga	Nana Nanino	2007	
"Professional Liar" †	Morandi	Andrei Ropcea; Marius Moga; Petre Ioachim	—	2019	
"Psychiki xreokopia"	Katerina Stikoudi	Eero Turunen; Jesus Bobe; Marius Moga; Poseidonas Giannopoulos	I mousiki mou	2011	
"Punani" †	Anda Adam	Marius Moga ‡	Queen of Hearts	2008	
"Radio înseamnă..."	Simplu with TNT	Florin Grozea; Marius Moga	Exploziv / Oare ştii...	2002	
"Ragga Stylee"	Anda Adam	Marius Moga; Mihai Coporan; Smiley	Confidențial	2005	
"Really"	—	Daniel Shah; Marius Moga; Mădălin Roşioru; Sorana Păcurar	—	Unknown	
"Red Bikini"	Akcent	Adrian Sînă; Marius Moga; Marius Nedelcu	King of Disco	2007	
"Reverse"	Morandi	Marius Moga ‡	Reverse	2005	
"Rock'n'Roll"	Hi-Q	Dana Nălbaru; Florin Grozea; Marius Moga	Pentru prieteni	2002	
"Rock'n'Roll My Baby"	Morandi	Andrei Maria; Marius Moga	Mind Fields	2006	
"Rock the World" †	Morandi	Andrei Ropcea; Marius Moga	—	2010	
"Rockstar"	—	Andrei Ropcea; Marius Moga	—	2011	
"Ruine" †	What's Up	Ionuț Vasilache; Marian Chiosea; Marius Ivancea; Marius Moga	—	2022	
"Running"	Morandi	Andrei Maria; Andrei Ropcea; Iulian Moga; Marius Moga	Reverse	2005	
"San sfaires stin kardia"	Katerina Stikoudi	Marius Moga; Poseidonas Giannopoulos	I mousiki mou	2011	
"Save Me" †	Morandi featuring Helene	Andrei Ropcea; Marius Moga	N3XT	2007	
"Să te cred, iar?"	Andreea Antonescu	Marius Moga ‡	Când dansam	2003	
"Să înceapă gălăgia!" †	VH2 with Anda Adam, What's Up and Alina Eremia	Marius Ivancea; Marius Moga; Mihai Pocorschi; Vladimir Pocorschi	—	2016	
"Să zburăm spre cer"	Simplu with Marius Moga	Andrei Maria; Marius Moga	Oare ştii...	2002	
"Sărută-mă şi taci"	Andreea Antonescu	Marius Moga ‡	Când dansam	2003	
"Sâmbătă seara"	Simplu	Alexandru Vaceff; Andrei Maria; Eduard Andreianu; Marius Moga	Oare ştii...	2002	
"Se anunță ploi"	Anda Adam	Marius Moga ‡	Queen of Hearts	2008	
"Se vede pe fața ei" †	Adda	Ada Moldovan; Andrei Maria; Marius Moga	—	2017	
"Seara îți pare rău"	Candy	Marius Moga ‡	De vis	2002	
"Secretul Mariei" †	Delia featuring Smiley	Marius Moga; Victor Solomon	Listen Up!	2005	
"Serenada" †	Morandi	Andrei Ropcea; Marius Moga	—	2011	
"Seven Seconds"	Buppy featuring Marius Moga and Simplu	Lennox Brown; Marius Moga	Universal Reggae Menu, Vol. 1	2004	
"Show-biz Baby!"	Andreea Bănică	Marius Moga; Vasiliu Matei	Rendez-Vous	2007	
"Showbiz"	Cream	Marius Moga; Sebastian Szemlye	Te vreau...	2005	
"Simt că mor"	Smiley	Andrei Maria; Marius Moga; Sergiu Istrati	În lipsa mea	2008	
"Singura greșeală" †	Florian Rus with Ioana Ignat	Florian Rus; Marius Moga; Marius Vasilache; Mark Azekko	—	2020	
"Sirene"	Fedez featuring Malika Ayane	Christoph Bauss; Federico Lucia; Fridolin Walcher; Lewis Hughes; Marius Moga; Nicholas Audino	Pop-hoolista	2014	
"Sk8 to This"	—	Lennox Brown; Marius Moga	—	Unknown	
"Slăbiciuni" †	DJ Project with Andia	Alexandru Pelin; Marius Moga; Petre Octavian; Radu Bolfea; Vlad Lucan	—	2020	
"So Cold"	Smiley featuring CRBL	Andrei Maria; Marius Moga	În lipsa mea	2008	
"So Sorry"	—	Andrei Ropcea; Marius Moga	—	2011	
"Soarele"	Anna Lesko	Bogdan Popoiag; Marius Moga	Flăcări	2002	
"Speranțe" †	Sistem with Simona Nae	Marius Moga; Zoli	Industrial	2003	
"Sportul preferat"	Florian Rus	Florian Rus; George Hora; Marius Moga; Mădălin Roşioru	Străzile din București	2019	
"Spune-mi"	Akcent	Marius Moga ‡	În culori	2002	
"Spune-mi cine"	Simona Nae featuring Connect-R	Connect-R; Marius Moga	Simona Nae	2005	
"Stai, nu mă certa"	Anda Adam	Marius Moga; Mihai Toma	Queen of Hearts	2008	
"Stay with Me" †	Akcent	Adrian Sînă; Eduard Ilie; Marius Moga	Fără lacrimi / True Believers	2008	
"Stele"	Anna Lesko	Bogdan Popoiag; Dan Badea; Marius Moga	Flăcări / Inseparabili	2002	
"Step by Step"	Simplu with Delia, Anda Adam and Cream	Marius Moga; Maurice Starr	Oficial îmi merge bine	2007	
"Still Waiting for Your Love"	Morandi	Andrei Ropcea; Marius Moga	Mind Fields	2006	
"Străzile din București" †	Florian Rus with Mira	Andi Grasu; Bogdan Todor; Florian Rus; Ionuț Vasilache; Marius Moga	Străzile din București	2019	
"Strânge-mă în brațe"	Cream	Andrei Ropcea; Marius Moga	Te vreau...	2005	
"Suflet pereche" †	Akcent	Marius Moga ‡	100 bpm	2003	
"Sufletul meu" †	Anda Adam	Marius Moga ‡	Queen of Hearts	2008	
"Summer in December" †	Morandi featuring Inna	Andrei Ropcea; Marius Moga	Body and the Sun / Inna	2014	
"Sun Goes Down"	Morandi	Andrei Ropcea; Marius Moga	N3XT	2007	
"Sunt bine" †	Adda	Adda Moldovan; Ana Maria Panturu; Cristian Suteu; Marius Moga	—	2014	
"Suntem păsări călătoare" †	Marius Moga featuring Achi	Marius Moga ‡	—	2015	
"Sus pe toc" †	Shift featuring Marius Moga	Gabriel Istrate; Marius Moga	Adevărul	2013	
"Sweet Surrender"	—	Bogdan Beciu; Florian Rus; Marius Moga	—	2017	
"Synchronize" †	Alex Parker featuring Alexandra Stan	Alex Parker; Marius Moga	—	2017	
"Știu ce îți place" †	Cream featuring Marius Moga and Matteo	Marius Moga; Smiley	48 de ore	2006	
"Tame My Beast"	—	Louis Biancaniello; Marius Moga; Samuel Watters	—	Unknown	
"Tare, tare"	Giulia	Andrei Ropcea; Marius Moga	Giulia	2004	
"Taxi" †	What's Up	Ciprian Alexandru; Marius Moga	—	2014	
"Te iubesc"	Andreea Bălan	Dan Griober; Florin Grozea; Marius Moga; Săndel Bălan	Liberă din nou	2002	
"Te iubesc"	Cream	Marius Moga; Sebastian Szemlye	Te vreau...	2005	
"Te joci cu mine" †	Andreea Bălan	Marius Moga; Săndel Bălan	Te joci cu mine	2002	
"Te strig"	Corina	Marius Moga ‡	Face Off	2006	
"Te voi găsi"	—	Marius Moga; Paul Surugiu	—	2001	
"Te voi iubi"	Anda Adam	Marius Moga; Smiley	Confidențial	2005	
"Tell Me Yes Tell Me No"	Anda Adam	Marius Moga ‡	Queen of Hearts	2008	
"Teniși" †	Ciprenko featuring Marius Moga	Marius Moga ‡	—	2016	
"The Last Tribe"	Morandi	Marius Moga; Mike Thomas	N3XT	2007	
"The Man Who Never Lied"	Maroon 5	Adam Levine; Brian West; Marius Moga	Overexposed	2012	
"The News"	Train	August Rigo; Jake Sinclair; Julian Moga; Marius Moga; Pat Monahan	A Girl, a Bottle, a Boat	2017	
"This Is How We Party" (Note: Samples "This Is How We Party" by S.O.A.P.) †	R3hab with Icona Pop	Aino Jawo; Caroline Hjelt; Claus Christensen; Fadil El Ghoul; Ferruccio Tebaldi; Holger Lagerfeldt; Lewis Hughes; Marius Moga; Nicholas Audino; Remee Jackman; Simon Hassle	—	2019	
"Timpul"	Paula Seling	Marius Moga; Paula Seling	...Fără sfârșit	2002	
"Toată lumea" †	Hi-Q	Florin Grozea; Marius Moga	Pentru prieteni	2002	
"Tot aștept"	Simplu	Marius Moga ‡	Oficial îmi merge bine	2007	
"Tot mai sus" †	Guess Who featuring DeMoga	Guess Who; Marius Moga; Vlad	Tot mai sus	2011	
"Trăiește!" †	Hi-Q	Dan Badea; Florin Grozea; Marius Moga	O mare de dragoste	2003	
"Tu (Inima și sufletul)" †	Ruby	Loredana Căvășdan; Marius Ivancea; Marius Moga	—	2014	
"Tu ești dragostea mea" †	Hi-Q	Dan Badea; Florin Grozea; Marius Moga	Pentru prieteni	2002	
"Tu și eu"	Cream	Marius Moga; Sebastian Szemlye	Te vreau...	2005	
"Ți-am promis" †	Akcent	Marius Moga ‡	În culori	2001	
"Ține-te bine"	Dana	Marius Moga ‡	Intră în joc	2005	
"Ugly Song"	Cătălin Josan	Marius Moga ‡	MegaStart	2007	
"Un loc in viața ta" †	Liviu Teodorescu	Ionuț Vasilache; Liviu Teodorescu; Marius Moga; Mădălin Roşioru	—	2014	
"Un lucru să-mi dai"	Andra	Marius Moga ‡	Dragostea rămâne	2008	
"Un pas înainte"	Smiley	Andrei Maria; Marius Moga	În lipsa mea	2008	
"Ușor ușor" †	CRBL featuring Adda and Raku	Marius Moga ‡	—	2014	
"Vara asta"	Delia featuring Michael Pow	Marius Moga; Michael Pow	Listen Up!	2007	
"Veronica Demonica" †	Cătălin Josan	Marius Moga; Mihai Coporan	MegaStart	2007	
"Viața are glas"	Simplu	Alexandru Vaceff; Andrei Maria; Eduard Andreianu; Marius Moga	Oare ştii...	2002	
"Viața e o aventură" †	Amna	Amna; Marius Moga; Robert Toma	—	2016	
"Viața în doi"	Simplu	Marius Moga; Simplu	Zece	2003	
"Voi fi lângă tine"	Blondy	Bogdan Popoiag; Dan Griober; Marius Moga	O parte din tine	2002	
"Volio Amar Te"	Morandi	Andrei Ropcea; Marius Moga	Mind Fields	2006	
"Vreau mai mult"	Anna Lesko	Marius Moga ‡	Inseparabili	2004	
"Vreau să simt (Iubirea-n ritmuri latine)"	Blondy	Marius Moga ‡	O parte din tine	2002	
"Vreau să zbor" †	Maia Mălăncuș featuring Adda	Marius Moga ‡	—	2017	
"Vrei altceva"	Alina	Marius Moga ‡	Vrei altceva	2002	
"Vrei să te mint?" †	Lora with Marius Moga	Bogdan Samoilenco; Marius Moga; Tomi Weissbuch	—	2021	
"Vrei nu vrei"	Cătălin Josan	Marius Moga; Mihai Coporan	MegaStart	2007	
"What About That"	—	George Hoga; Jason Mater; Marius Moga	—	Unknown	
"What Is Love" (Note: Samples "What Is Love" by Haddaway)	Anda Adam	Haddaway; Marius Moga	Queen of Hearts	2008	
"When We're Together"	Cătălin Josan	Marius Moga ‡	MegaStart	2007	
"Where Do You Keep Your Love"	Buppy featuring Marius Moga	Lennox Brown; Marius Moga	Universal Reggae Menu, Vol. 1	2006	
"Who Do You Love"	Ryan Beatty	Marius Moga; Ryan Beatty	—	Unknown	
"Xing"	Morandi	Marius Moga; Mihai Coporan	Reverse	2005	
"Yamasha" †	Alex	Alex; Marius Moga; Smiley	Yamasha	2006	
"You Win"	—	Lisa Scinta; Marius Moga; Theron Feemster	—	Unknown	
"You Won't Lose Me (Jay in a Bar)"	Sonna with Shaggy	Brian West; Marius Moga; Orville Burrell; Sonna	Sonna Rele	2014	
"You're My Star"	Andra	Marius Moga ‡	Dragostea rămâne	2008	
"Young Hearts" †	Strange Talk	Benjamin Berger; Gerard Sidhu; Lionel Towers; Marius Moga; Ryan McMahon; Stephen Docker	Cast Away	2014	
"Zece"	Simplu	Dan Griober; Marius Moga; Simplu	Zece	2003	
"Zhestoka" (Жестока) †	Slavi Trifonov with Nevena Tsoneva	Ivaylo Valchev; Marius Moga	Nie prodalzhavame (Ние продължаваме)	2007	
"Ziua ta" †	Delia	Marius Moga ‡	Listen Up!	2005	
"Zvonuri"	Alina	Marius Moga ‡	Vrei altceva	2002	
