= MTV Romania Music Awards 2006 =

2006 MTV Romania Music Awards
- Date: 3 June 2006
- Location: Cluj-Napoca
- Hosted by: Hi-Q
- Website: mtv.ro/rma2007

Television/radio coverage
- Network: MTV Romania

The MTV Romania Music Awards 2006 (Romanian: Premiile muzicale MTV România 2006) were presented on June 3 at Sala Sporturilor Horia Demian in Cluj-Napoca, Romania. This was the fifth time the MTV Romania Music Awards have been presented.

== Awards ==
- Best Group: Akcent (Dragoste de închiriat)
- Best Song: Morandi (Beijo (Uh la la))
- Best Female: Loredana (Le le)
- Best Male: Ștefan Bănică, Jr. (Numele tău)
- Best Hip-Hop: Paraziții (Violent)
- Best New Act: Heaven, (Pentru totdeauna)
- Best Dance: DJ Project (Șoapte)
- Best Album: Pavel Stratan (Amintiri din copilărie)
- Best Rock: Iris (Maxima)
- Best Pop: Voltaj (Povestea oricui)
- Best Live Performance: Proconsul (Iași 2005, MTV Live)
- Best Video: Morandi (Falling asleep)
- Free Your Mind Award: Soknan Han Jung - UN
