= Andreea Bălan =

Romanian singer (born 1984)

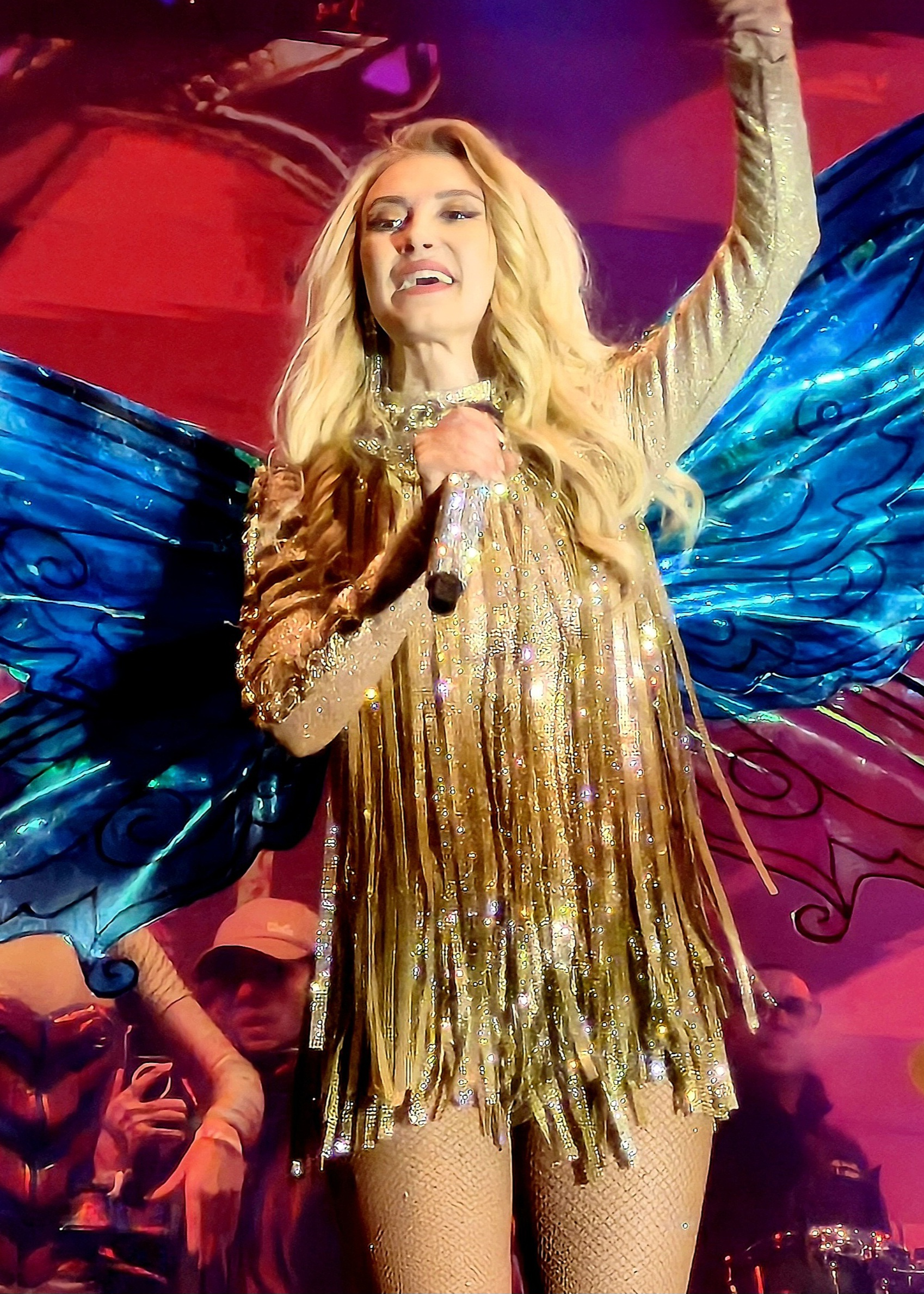
- Andreea Bălan at the 2025 edition of Bucharest Christmas Market

Background information
- Born: 23 June 1984 (age 42)
- Origin: Ploiești, Romania
- Genres: Pop; EDM
- Occupation: Singer
- Years active: 1998–present
- Label: Cat Music
- Member of: Andrè
- Website: andreeab.ro

Andreea Georgiana Bălan (Romanian pronunciation: [anˈdree̯a bəˈlan]; born 23 June 1984) is a Romanian pop singer. Bălan started singing on children's TV shows but became known as a member of the girl group Andrè (1998–2002), along with Andreea Antonescu. In 2002, she started a solo career and archived over 6 solo albums. Bălan is recognized for her concert tours in Romania, mixing dance music and performances with over ten costume changes.

== Life and career ==
=== Childhood and early career (1994-1998) ===
Andreea Bălan was born on 23 June 1984 to Săndel and Valeria Bălan. She was known by those around her during her early years as being a "very good child". She attended Ion Luca Caragiale High School in Ploiești.

Bălan began singing at the age of 10, under the guidance of her father. She composed several pieces with which she participated in a series of performances for children in Ploiești. In these recitals, she was noticed by Mihai Constantinescu. Bălan was then invited by him to participate in the children's show Ba da, ba nu, which was broadcast on the Romanian channel TVR 1. She was later invited to other shows, such as Feriți-vă de măgăruș, Abracadabra, Video Magazin and Tip Top Mini Top. During this period, she participated in various children's festivals, receiving several awards, with the most notable being the Little Prince International Festival. Attended by children from 16 countries, Bălan was given the "Little Princess of Europe" award, presented by then President Emil Constantinescu. Negotiations were made for her to form a group with Simona Nae, but the plans never materialized following disagreements between their parents.

In 1997, Bălan took part in Eurovision's National Gala, performing "Un univers mai liniștit", but was disqualified because she did not fit the age criteria. In the following year, Bălan became the first child to release an album on a compact disc in Romania. The album, Amețiți de fum, contained 10 songs composed by her father and dances orchestrated by Cătălin Tîrcolea. Although officially released, it was not widely distributed due to a lack of funds. It was claimed to be the first Romanian dance music release due to the songs on the album, such as "Rezemat de gard".

=== Andrè (1999–2001) ===
Towards the end of 1998, the musical project Andrè was born, with members Andreea Antonescu and Bălan first meeting on the program Ba da, ba nu. Although member Gigi Antonescu was reluctant to join at first, Andrè proved to be a national success, gaining notoriety both within Romania and internationally, with their target audience being teenagers. The songs on their debut album, La întâlnire, were made mostly by Săndel Bălan. The album included the song "Un univers mai liniștit," known in other countries as "Iluzii", which was previously performed by Bălan at Eurovision. Their debut album was released in May 1999 and proved to be a commercial success, selling over 50,000 copies by that September. The group gained major popularity due to their simple musical style and rhythmic beats. To promote the album, they performed "La întâlnire", "Să ne distrăm" and "Nu mă uita" on numerous television shows, but none of the songs featured music videos. Their first single earned success on radio stations, despite the radio's lack of support for Romanian musicians.

The song "Liberă la mare" was released in the summer of 1999 and became a signature song for the group. It was played during several occasions, including the Mamaia's Festival, where the song won 1st place, with Bălan becoming the youngest singer to win the award. At the end of that year, the album "Noapte de vis" was released and was promoted with the song "Noapte de vis (Moșule, ce tânăr ești)", along with a video for the song. "Noapte de vis" was named number 16 in the "Top 20 after 90", a ranking organized by Kiss FM and the "Click" magazine, based on public voting. In 2008, "Liberă la mare" was ranked 29th in the top made by the television U TV entitled "Top 100 songs that have broken Romania in two".

Andrè released their third album, Prima iubire, in 2000, promoted with the singles "Prima iubire" and "Lasă-mă papa la mare", both Top 20 hits in Romania. "Lasă-mă papa la mare" was named No. 19 in the "Top 20 after 90" ranking based on public voting. Andrè released their next album, Am să-mi fac de cap, in 2000, which was promoted with the songs "Am să-mi fac de cap" and "Flori de tei" as well as their respective music videos. The music video for "Flori de tei" became the most expensive video ever made Romania at the time, with a budget of US$12,000, as well as the first music video shot on film.

In early 2001, the magazine Bravo awarded the distinction of "Best band for teens" to Andrè. Record label Cat Music awarded the group with five platinum and one gold certifications for the 1.5 million albums sold, calling their music "princesses dance music", which made them become the first and only group with these awards.

The group split for a short time because of disagreements. Bălan continued her career by forming a duo with Alina Sorescu. Although they had a number of television appearances, the project ended after six months without releasing an album or a video. At the same time, a greatest hits album was released for Andrè, titled Andrè - The Best Of. The group met after the death of Antonescu's father, whose last wish was that the group reunite. The group released a duo album, O noapte și-o zi, in 2001, as well as a single of the same name accompanied by a video, but then split again. Bălan consequently denied any chance of a reconciliation work between the two, considering only a possible duet.

Throughout her career alongside Antonescu, the two were heavily criticized for the fashion style and image they promoted. The two had a great influence on the young, bringing platform heels, box braids, mini skirts and push-up bras that highlighted their breasts into fashion. The two performers were constantly under the attention of tabloid newspapers that published rumors of their quarrels.

=== Solo career (2002–2007) ===
On 23 June 2002, Bălan released her second solo album, Te joci cu mine, which was released under the Cat Music label and distributed by Media Services. The album contains the song "Te joci cu mine", originally composed for Andrè. The song was promoted and ranked lowest of the Romanian Top 100. No other singles were promoted on the album. Between June and September of the same year, over 30,000 copies of the album were distributed.

The success of the album was followed by the release of another album, Liberă din nou, in September. Between 22 December 2002 and 22 January 2003, she gave a tour of 14 concerts in the United States. The album included the singles "Liberă din nou" and "Plâng de dor". On 1 March 2003, the video for the single "Plâng de dor", which would later be available as a maxi single, was filmed. In the following summer, the song "Nopți de vară" was released in the remake of the album Liberă din nou. It enjoyed great success on radio, receiving first place in the "Best Songs" category of Mamaia's Festival, as voted by viewers. During the same period, Bălan began a collaboration with the band News, a group of 12 instrumentalists, starting a national tour. The collaboration was shortly halted due to financial problems.

Bălan released the album Așa sunt eu in 2004, containing lyrics of a more mature pop rock influence. The album promoted five singles, with three tracks placing on the Romanian Top 100. The singles were released in five separate parts. "Aparențe" and "Oops, eroare" were each released in 2004, while "Evadez", "Invidia" and "O străină" were each released in 2005. This made Bălan one of the few Romanian artists to promote five singles from a single album. The songs on the album were inspired by her life, each covering themes such as fame, life in front of the camera, and failure of love. In 2005, Bălan received an award for the best website at the MTV Romania Music Awards. The website presented a picture of the musician, characterized by black clothes, makeup, and a rebellious attitude, contrasting with the image that she promoted previously.

Bălan produced two more singles with the album Andreea B. The first single was "Nu știu să fiu numai pentru tine" (feat. Keo), which was nominated for the award "Best Hit - Featuring" on the Romanian Top Hits. The second single, "Prinde-mă, aprinde-mă!", was designated the "gay song of the year" at the Gala Gay Awards 2007. "Prinde-mă, aprinde-mă!" is the most watched video of the artist on YouTube, with over 2.8 million views.

=== Dancing and return to dance music (2008–present) ===
Bălan opted to participate in a dance pair in the third season of dance competition television show Dansez pentru tine, broadcast on PRO TV in the spring of 2007. The evolution of the dance pair through the competition was acclaimed by audiences and the jury. Bălan ultimately placed in third place. In the spring of 2008, the dance pair participated in the "League winners" season, dedicated to the best in the history of the competition. Bălan placed first place. Between the two seasons, she was selected to participate in the PRO TV international version of Dansez pentru tine, titled Dancing Around the World. The competition was held in Mexico, and Bălan participated alongside dance partner Petrișor Ruge, her partner during Dansez pentru tine. The pair ultimately ranked in second place, enjoying great popularity among the Mexican public, and received a contract from EMI Music to record an album. Following her appearance on Dansez pentru tine, her career took her on the rise.

Bălan was among the best-selling artists in Romania in terms of concerts from 2008 to present, having ranked in the top 3. By 2011, Bălan had performed at more than 150 concerts.

On 28 June 2009, Bălan released a new single titled "God". It was released exclusively on Kiss FM. "Trippin'", released in 2010, became one of Bălan's most popular singles released, as well as her first Top 40 hit in the Romanian Top 100 in five years. Bălan performed the song "Trippin'" at several events, including the final of Miss Universe Romania in 2010, as well as the ninth edition of the Romanian Music Awards. The song contains elements of dance music combined with elements of popcorn, a musical style intensely broadcast on the Romanian radio at the time of the song's release.

The song "Like a Bunny" was released on 13 May 2011 on Bălan's YouTube account, with its music video presenting Bălan in a bathing suit, reminiscent of a Playboy Playmate. On 8 June 2011, Bălan released the song "Loving" in collaboration with Andra, Connect-R, and Puya. In October 2011, Bălan mentioned that there is a chance of the reunion of Andrè since they could not handle a solo career. In 2012, Bălan released the single "Money Love". She held several shows, including the Dancing Show, the Bunny Show, the Beach Party, and the Christmas Party. In October 2012, Bălan released the twenty-fifth video of her musical career, "Mă doare fără tine". In August 2013, she released the song "Things U do 2 me" in collaboration with Mike Diamondz. Presently, Bălan consistently holds concerts around the country.

In 2015, the artist was chosen by Disney to provide the Romanian singing voice of Esmeralda for the feature film The Hunchback of Notre Dame.

== Image and musical style ==
Over her musical career, Bălan has adopted several musical styles and image changes in an attempt to adapt to new trends. Her album Superwoman visibly distanced its musical style from her past recordings, containing elements of samba, rock and roll, and jive, and finalizing her image as a soloist dancer.

Bălan's choreographies and costumes have sometimes been criticized for being too sexual, although in general, her concerts have received positive reviews by both the public and journalists.

Bălan has named Celine Dion, Mariah Carey and Loredana Groza as singers that she appreciates the most. She is often referred to as the Romanian princess of pop music or the Romanian Britney Spears.

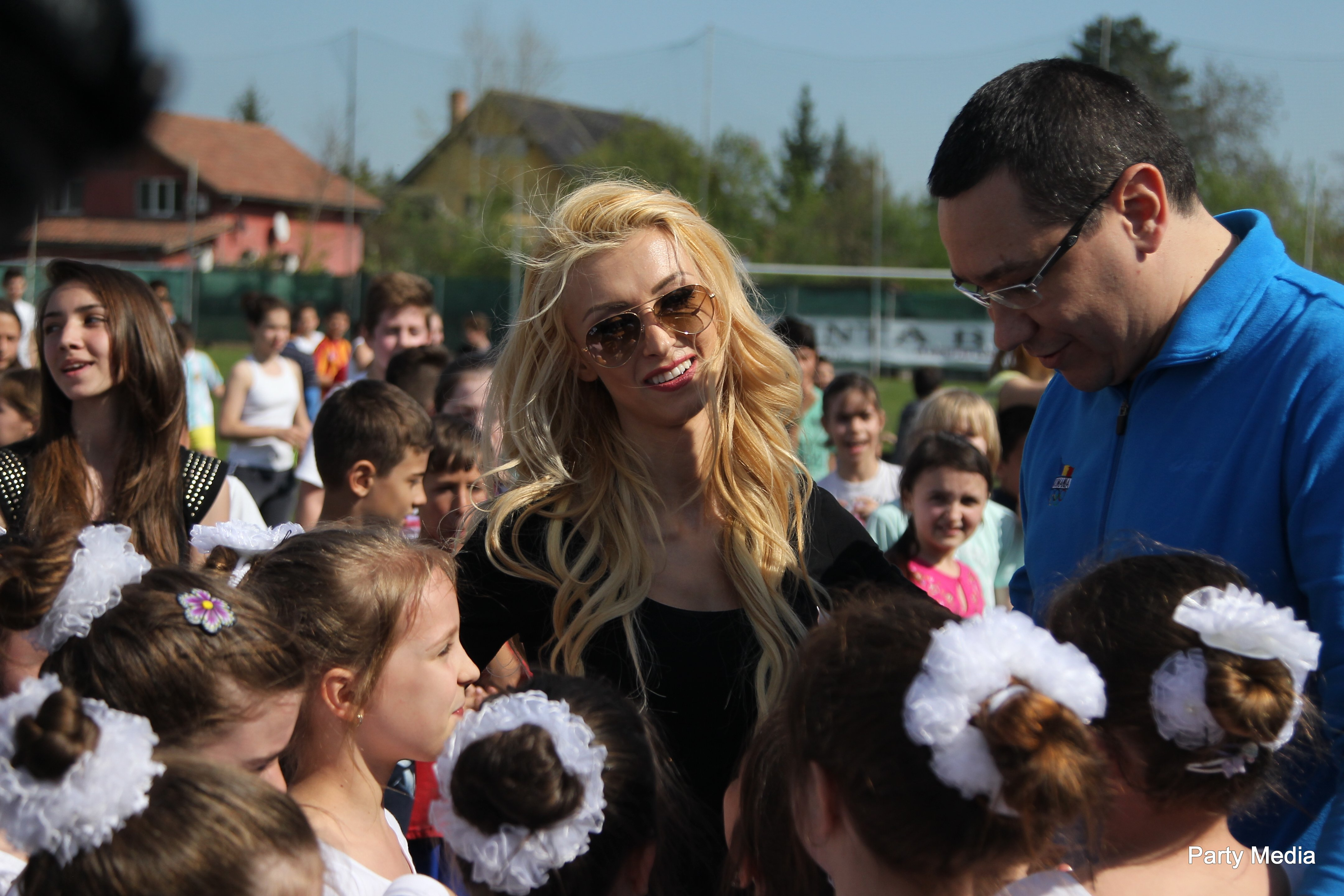
Andreea Bălan in Buftea for the event "Mișcarea înseamnă viață"

== Personal life ==
In 2004, Bălan moved from her parental home in Ploiești to Bucharest, where she met Teo Păcurar. In 2005, the two were engaged. The couple broke up in 2006 due to disagreements in living arrangements. Shortly after the breakup, Bălan appeared at social events with Keo, who helped her overcome her separation from Păcurar. Despite rumors of their separation, Bălan and Keo have denied these rumors.

Bălan has completed specialization courses in journalism and philosophy from the Spiru Haret University, Bucharest, citing a desire to have a future career in television.

Bălan is not related to Dan Bălan, a Moldovan singer and songwriter.

=== Reaction to tabloid newspapers ===
Bălan has had a frequent presence in tabloid newspapers.

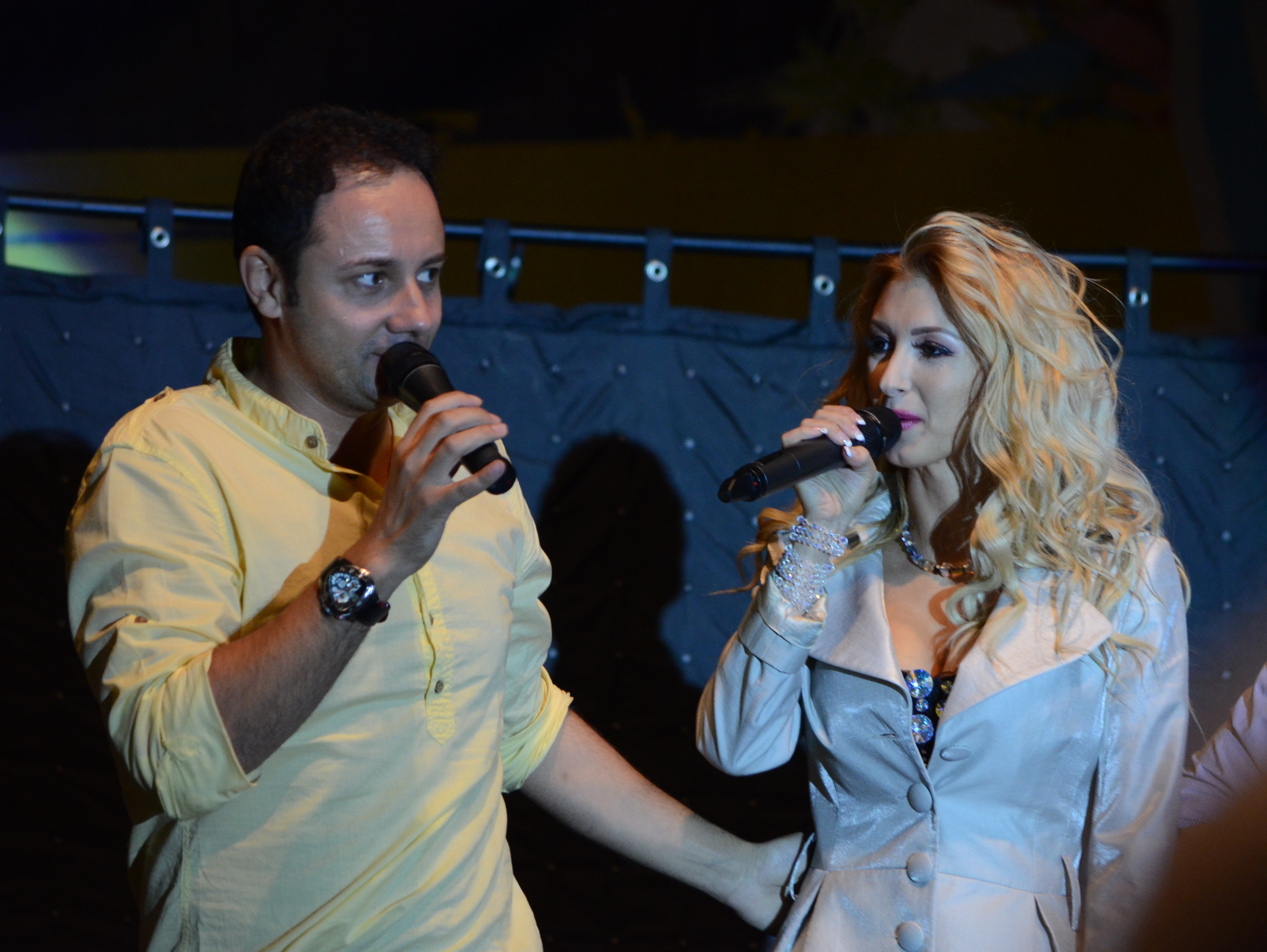
Cătălin Măruță and Andreea Bălan

A dispute arose between the singer and the TV presenter Cătălin Măruță on the PRO TV television show Happy Hour in late April 2010. Invited to the show, Bălan presented views critical of newspapers. The conflict continued for a short period, with the two criticizing each other in the press on various occasions, culminating in the blocking of Bălan's appearance in a special edition of the show Dansez pentru tine.

== Discography ==
=== Albums with Andrè ===
- La Întâlnire (1999)
- Noapte de Vis (1999)
- Prima Iubire (2000)
- Am Să-mi Fac De Cap (2000)
- The Best Of (2001)
- O Noapte Și-o Zi (2001)

=== Solo albums ===
- Te joci cu mine (2002)
- Liberă din nou (2002)
- Așa sunt eu (2004)
- Andreea B (2006)
- SuperWoman (2009)
- Soare după nori (2021)
- O lume minunată (2024)
- Pentru totdeauna (2026)

== Videography ==
Year	Title	Director	Album	Notes
2002	"Te joci cu mine"	—	Te joci cu mine	—
2002	"Liberă din nou"	Dragoș Buliga	Liberă din nou	—
2003	"Plâng de dor"	Dragoș Buliga	Liberă din nou	—
2003	"Nopți de vară"	—	Liberă din nou	—
2004	"Aparențe"	—	Așa sunt eu!	—
2004	"Oops, eroare!"	—	Așa sunt eu!	—
2005	"Evadez"	—	Așa sunt eu!	—
2005	"Invidia"	—	Așa sunt eu!	—
2005	"O străină"	Dragoș Buliga	Așa sunt eu!	—
2006	"Nu știu să fiu numai pentru tine"	—	Andreea B	—
2007	"Prinde-mă, aprinde-mă!"	Dragoș Buliga	Andreea B	—
2008	"Baby Get Up and Dance"	Dragoș Buliga	SuperWoman	—
2009	"SuperWoman"	Iulian Moga	SuperWoman	—
2009	"Snow"	Alex Ceaușu	—	—
2010	"Trippin'"	Alex Ceaușu	—	—
2011	"Crazy About You"	Alex Ceaușu	—	—
2011	"Like a Bunny"	Alex Ceaușu	—	—
2012	"Money Love"	Alex Ceaușu	—	—
2012	"Mă doare fără tine"	Alex Ceaușu	—	—
2013	"Things u do 2 me" (feat. Mike Diamondz)	Alex Ceaușu	—	—
2013	"Iubi" (feat. Sonny Flame)	Ciprian Strugariu	—	—
2014	"Decor" (feat. Criss Blaziny)	Ciprian Strugariu & Criss Blaziny	—	—
2014	"Super Soaker" (feat. Skinny Fabulous & Monsta Riot)	Anthony Icuagu	—	—
2014	"Rece"	Bogdan Daragiu		
2015	"Baila"	Alex Ceaușu		
2015	"Throw your Money" (feat. Drei Ross)	Matei Dima	—	—
