= Reverse (Morandi album) =

Studio album by Morandi
- Released: 17 July 2005
- Recorded: 2004–2005
- Label: Roton; Mini Maxi Mo
- Producer: Marius Moga; Andrei Ropcea; Andrei Maria

Morandi chronology
Reverse (2005)	Mind Fields (2006)

Reverse is the debut album from Romanian group Morandi released in 2005. It had big success in Europe. Morandi released their first single, "Love Me", in November 2004. It was successful, especially in many clubs of Bucharest.

== Track listing ==
Credits adapted from the liner notes of Reverse.

Reverse track listing
No.	Title	Writer(s)	Length
1.	"Reverse"	Marius Moga	3:25
2.	"Love Me"	Moga; Andrei Ropcea	3:26
3.	"Amore"	Moga; Ropcea	3:43
4.	"Blue"	Moga	3:46
5.	"By Your Side"	Moga; Andrei Maria; Ropcea	3:24
6.	"Can I Touch"	Moga; Ropcea	3:23
7.	"Hot" (featuring Loredana)	Moga; Mihai Coporan; Loredana Groza	4:11
8.	"Beijo (Uh La La)"	Moga; Ropcea	3:23
9.	"Running"	Moga; Ropcea; Iulian Moga; Maria	3:53
10.	"So Cold"	Moga; Mihai Toma	6:00
11.	"Xing"	Moga; Coporan	2:56
Total length:			41:45

== Singles ==
1. Love Me
2. Beijo

== Certifications ==
Region	Certification
Romania (UFPR)	Gold

== See also ==
- List of certified albums in Romania
