= Confidențial =

Studio album by Anda Adam
- Released: 13 October 2005
- Recorded: 2003–2004
- Studio: Mini Maxi Mo Records
- Genres: Pop; hip hop; R&B; pop rock; dance
- Length: 36:16
- Languages: Romanian; English (Note: The only song that contains English lyrics is "Nai, Nai", which are sung by the featured artist Bishop.)
- Labels: Roton; NRG!A
- Producers: Marius Moga; Smiley

Anda Adam chronology
Doar Cu Tine (2003)	Confidențial (2005)	Queen of Hearts (2009)

Singles from Confidențial
- 1. "Ce ți-aș face (Selecta)" Released: August 2005; 2. "Ajutor" Released: March 2006; 3. "Nai, Nai" Released: September 2006; 4. "Ochii Mei" Released: fall 2007

Confidențial is the debut studio album by the Romanian singer Anda Adam. It was released on 13 October 2005, under Roton records. The album features the successful lead single "Ce ți-aș face (Selecta)", which peaked at number two in the singer's native Romanian Top 100. "Ajutor", "Nai, Nai" and "Ochii Mei" were later released as follow-up singles. As of 2007, the record has sold over 20,000 copies in Romania, resulting in it being certified platinum.

== Background ==
In 1999, Anda collaborated with Romanian band R.A.C.L.A. on the EP Nu mă uita, making it her first musical project. On the EP, she was featured on the songs, "Nu mă uita", which became a notable hit in Romania, and "Fiesta". This inspired Anda to start recording her own musical projects, which resulted in the releases of two EPs Ca Între Fete and Doar Cu Tine in 1999 and 2003 respectively.

After spending more than a year recording songs in the studio, Confidențial was officially released on 13 October 2005. It featured 10 individual tracks, all of them produced by singer-songwriter and producer Marius Moga, who also co-wrote most of the album's songs. The first single, "Ce ți-aș face (Selecta)" featuring the Romanian Hip-Hop singer Alex Velea was released in August 2005. The song quickly gained success, and peaked number two on the Romanian Top 100. Music videos for the songs "Ajutor", "Nai, Nai", and "Ochii Mei" were released the following year to promote the album, all having moderate success in Romania.

The song "Dragostea Doare" was featured on the second and fifth editions of the compilation albums Declarație De Dragoste, which featured various love songs by several Romanian artists, including Connect-R, Morandi, Play & Win, and Akcent.

== Reception ==
Confidențial was met with positive reviews from music critics. Romanian website Muzica9 called the record one of Anda's best albums released at the time.

The album sold over 20,000 units as of 2007, resulting in it being certified platinum. To celebrate this occasion, Anda performed live at the Pat club in Bucharest, on June 20.

== Track listing ==
Traklist adapted from Apple Music. Credits adapted from the liner notes of Confidențial.

Confidențial – Standard version
No.	Title	Writer(s)	Producer(s)	Length
1.	"Ce ți-aș face (Selecta) (ft. Alex Velea)"	Alex Velea; Marius Moga	Moga	3:26
2.	"Ajutor"	Moga	Moga; Sebastian Zsemlye	3:27
3.	"Ragga Stylee"	Moga; Smiley	Moga; Mihai Coporan	3:38
4.	"Nai, Nai (ft. Bishop)"	Moga; Bishop	Moga; Coporan	3:49
5.	"Nu Sunt Cuminte"	Andrei Ropcea; Smiley	Ropcea; Smiley	3:33
6.	"Ochii Mei"	Moga; Smiley	Moga; Smiley	3:32
7.	"Te Voi Iubi"	Moga	Moga; Smiley	3:37
8.	"Faceţi loc"	Moga	Moga; Smiley	4:01
9.	"Al Noualea Cer"	Moga	Ropcea; Moga; Smiley	3:34
10.	"Dragostea Doare"	Moga	Moga	3:53
Total length:				36:16

=== Notes ===
- "Nai, Nai" samples Missy Elliott's "Get Ur Freak On".

== Certifications and sales ==
Region	Certification
Romania	Platinum

== Release history ==
Country	Date	Format(s)	Label	Ref.
Romania	13 October 2005	CD, Cassette	Roton	
