= MTV Romania Music Awards 2005 =

2005 MTV Romania Music Awards
- Date: 28 April 2005
- Location: Sala Palatului
- Website: diffstudios.com/works/rma2005

Television/radio coverage
- Network: MTV Romania

The fourth Annual MTV Romania Music Awards (Romanian: Premiile muzicale MTV România 2005) were held in Sala Palatului on April 28, 2005.

== Nominees/Winners ==
=== Best Hip-Hop ===
- Sişu & Puya - Foame De Bani
- Parazitii ft. Larry Flynt - Jos Cenzura
- Ombladon ft. Raku - Egali Din Naştere WINNER
- Bitza & Tataee - Următorul Pas
- BUG Mafia - O Lume Nebună, Nebună De Tot

=== Best New Act ===
- Bitza - Următorul Pas
- M&G - Asalt Raggafonic
- Morandi - Love Me
- Pavel Stratan - Eu Beu WINNER
- Planeta Moldova - Alimentara

=== Best Female ===
- Andra - Doar O Clipă
- Delia - Parfum De Fericire
- Loredana - Extravaganza
- Miki - Fără Tine
- Nicola - Îţi Multumesc WINNER

=== Best Male ===
- Bitza - Vorbeste Vinul
- Ombladon - Egali De Naştere
- Pavel Stratan - Eu Beu
- Pepe - Numai Iubirea WINNER
- Ștefan Bănică, Jr. - Iubeşte-o Sincer

=== Best Song ===
- Activ - Doar Cu Tine WINNER
- Hi-Q - Gaşca Mea
- Impact - Baby
- Morandi - Love Me
- Ombladon ft. Raku - Egali Din Naştere

=== Best Album ===
- Activ - Motive
- Bitza - Sevraj
- Impact - Babe
- Parazitii - Primii 10 Ani WINNER
- Voltaj - Povestea Oricui

=== Best Live Act ===
- Loredana vs. Sistem - RMA 04
- Parazitii - ClubJ, MTV Live
- Viorica şi Ioniţă din Clejani vs. DJ Allstar - RMA 04
- Vita De Vie - ClubJ, MTV Live WINNER
- Zdob Si Zdub - ClubJ, MTV Live

=== Best Website ===
- www.andreeab.ro WINNER
- www.clubimpact.ro
- www.directia5.com
- www.proconsul.com.ro
- www.vitadevie.ro

=== Best Dance ===
- Activ - Doar Cu Tine
- Hi-Q - Gaşca Mea
- Impact - Baby (Impact song)
- Morandi - Love Me WINNER
- Simplu - 10

=== Best Etno ===
- Etnic & Haiducii - Zorilor (song) WINNER
- Ro-Mania - Basca
- Tom Boxer - Căciula Pe-O Ureche
- Viorica şi Ioniţă din Clejani - Vraja (song)
- Zdob Si Zdub - Cucusor

=== Best Pop ===
- Class - Pentru Dragoste
- Directia 5 - Eşti Îngerul Meu WINNER
- Nicola - De Mă Vei Chema
- Sistem ft. Alexandra Ungureanu - Departe De Tine
- Voltaj - Şi Ce?

=== Best Group ===
- Activ - Doar Cu Tine
- Directia 5 - Eşti Îngerul Meu
- Hi-Q - Gaşca Mea
- Parazitii - Fuck You Romania
- Voltaj - Şi Ce? WINNER

=== Best Rock ===
- Cargo - Nu Pot Trăi Fără Tine WINNER
- Firma (band) - Important
- Praf In Ochi - 1000 De Gânduri
- Vita De Vie - Îmi Pasă
- Zdob Si Zdub - DJ Vasile

=== Best Video ===
- Sensor (band) - Help Yourself

=== Lifetime Award ===
- Teo Peter (post mortem)
