= Beijo =

2005 single by Morandi

"Beijo (Uh-La-La)"

Single by Morandi

from the album Reverse
- Released: April 28, 2005
- Recorded: 2005
- Genre: Electronic, Euro House
- Length: 3:23
- Label: Roton Music

Morandi singles chronology
"Love Me" (2004)	"Beijo (Uh-La-La)" (2005)	"Running" (2005)

Music video
- "Beijo (Uh-La-La)" on YouTube

Beijo (Uh-La-La) is a song by Romanian music group Morandi from the album Reverse released on April 28, 2005, during the MTV Romania Music Awards ceremony. The song's lyrics are sung in Portuguese. The song was a popular summer hit in Romania in 2005, and in July of that year, reached number 1 on the MTV Europe and World Chart Express charts, overtaking singles by Coldplay, U2 and Shakira.

== Charts ==
Chart (2005–2006)	Peak position
Romania (Romanian Top 100)	1
Slovakia (Rádio Top 100)	54

=== Awards ===
Year	Nominee / work	Award	Result	Ref.
MTV Romania Music Awards 2006	Itself	Best Song	Won	

== See also ==
- List of Romanian Top 100 number ones of the 2000s
