= Andreea Antonescu =

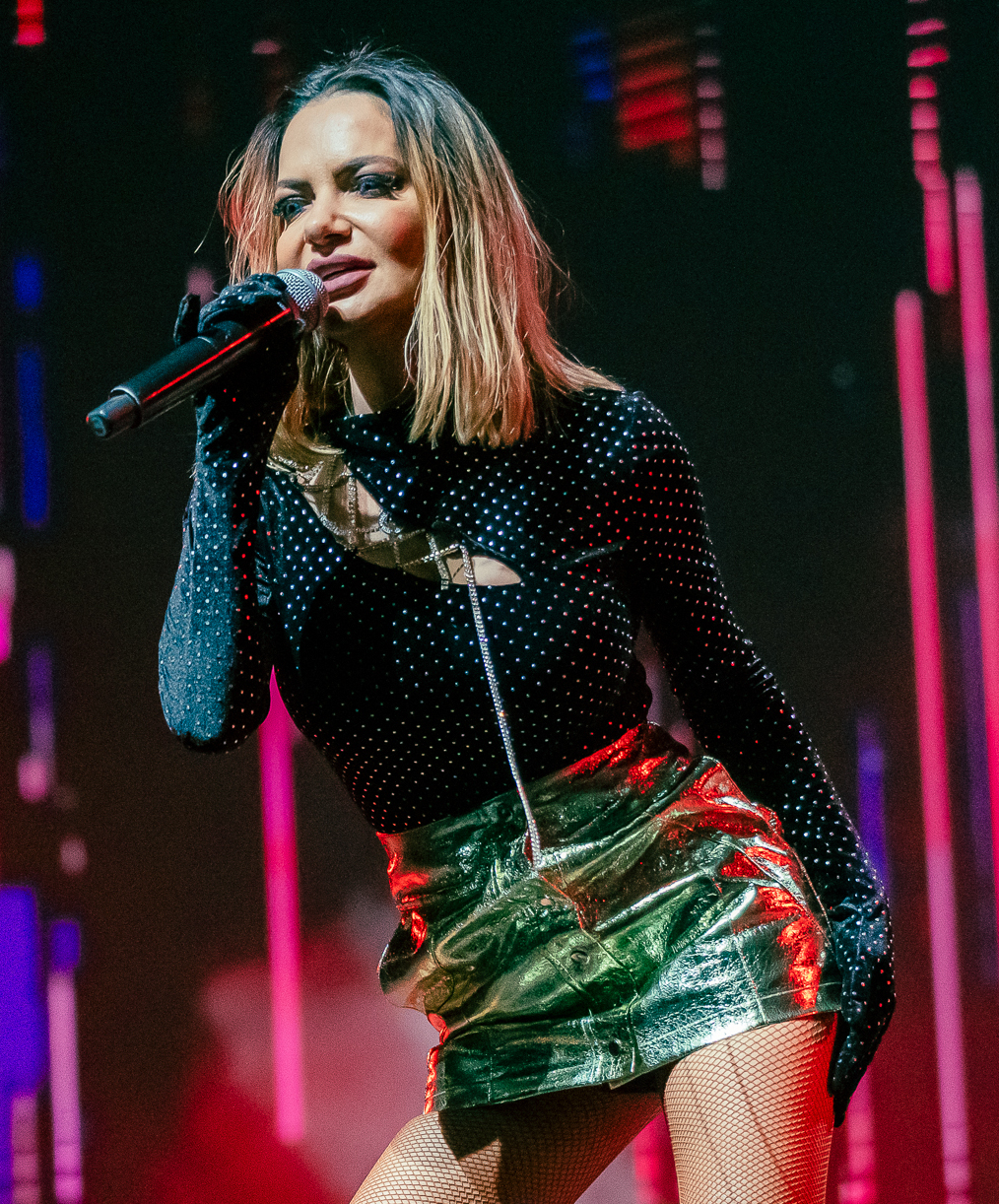
- Andreea Antonescu in 2023

Background information
- Origin: Galați, Romania
- Genres: Pop; EDM
- Occupation: Singer
- Years active: 1998–present
- Labels: Cat Music, Roton

Andreea Antonescu is a Romanian singer.

== Career ==
Antonescu began her musical career at the age of six, participating in music competitions and festivals and winning awards. At the age of 12, she released her first album, "Din vina ta", featuring 10 songs written by Adrian Ordean. After André, a band she formed with fellow singer Andreea Bălan, disbanded, Antonescu pursued a solo career, releasing three albums and multiple singles.

By early June, Antonescu was involved in the DISKOteka project, the largest European retro music festival, where she was both part of the organizing team and its official face. Shortly after, the announcement of André's reunion followed. In September, Andreea released the single "Iubirea Pe Acte" after a two-year hiatus.

=== 1998–2001: Andrè reunion ===
In late 1998, Antonescu relaunched her former band Andrè with Bălan. Andrè achieved a national success within Romania and internationally, with their target audience being teenagers. Their debut album was released in May 1999 and proved to be a commercial success, selling over 50,000 copies by that September. The group gained major popularity due to their simple musical style and rhythmic beats. To promote the album, they performed "La întâlnire", "Să ne distrăm" and "Nu mă uita" on numerous television shows, but none of the songs featured music videos. Their first single earned success on radio stations, despite the radio's lack of support for Romanian musicians.

The song "Liberă la mare" was released in the summer of 1999, and became a signature song for the group. It was played during several occasions, including the Mamaia's Festival, where the song won 1st place, with Bălan becoming the youngest singer to win the award. At the end of that year, the album "Noapte de vis" was released, and was promoted with the song "Noapte de vis (Moșule, ce tânăr ești)", along with a video for the song. "Noapte de vis" was named number 16 in the "Top 20 after 90", a ranking organized by Kiss FM and "Click" magazine, based on public voting. In 2008, "Liberă la mare" was ranked in the top 29 television made U TV entitled "Top 100 songs that Romania had broken in two".

Andrè released their third album, Prima iubire, in 2000, promoted with the singles "Prima iubire" and "Lasă-mă papa la mare", both Top 20 hits in Romania. "Lasă-mă papa la mare" was named No. 19 in the "Top 20 after 90" ranking based on public voting. Andrè released their next album, Am să-mi fac de cap, in 2000, which was promoted with the songs "Am să-mi fac de cap" and "Flori de tei" as well as their respective music videos. The music video for "Flori de tei" became the most expensive video ever made Romania at the time, with a budget of US$12,000, as well as the first music video shot on film.

In early 2001, the magazine Bravo awarded the distinction of "Best band for teens" to Andrè. Record label Cat Music awarded the group with five platinum and one gold certifications for the 1.5 million albums sold, and becoming the first group and the only with these awards. The group split for a short time because of disagreements. At the same time, a greatest hits album was released for Andrè, titled Andrè – The Best Of. The group released a duo album, O noapte și-o zi, in 2001 as well as a single of the same name accompanied by a video, but disbanded again shortly after.

=== 2002–present: Solo Career ===
In 2002, Antonescu released her self-titled album AndreEA, which included the hit "Prea Târziu". She later collaborated with Italian artist Fabrizio Faniello on the single "Când dansam/When We Dance", which was nominated at the MTV Romania Awards in the "Best Pop" category. This single was also part of her 2003 album of the same name.

In 2005, Antonescu released the album Metamorfoza, featuring the hit "Îmi văd de viața mea", a collaboration with Marijuana and Connect-R.

In 2010, Antonescu began using the stage name Miss Ventura, releasing the songs "Ready For Us", "Can You Feel It", and "My Love". She resumed using her birth name in 2013 and released the single "Pune-o pe repeat!".

Antonescu later released other singles, such as "Amanta fidelă" and "Când vine noaptea" in 2017.

=== 2019–present: The Return of Andrè and Iubirea Pe Acte ===
In April 2019, Antonescu and Bălan rejoined as André. Their first single as the band was released, titled "Reset la Inimă", on 9 July 2019.

In 2024, André disbanded again. The decision was made by mutual agreement following the conclusion of the television show "America Express", in which both members of the band participated.

== Discography ==
=== Albums (as Andrè) ===
- La Întâlnire (1999)
- Noapte de Vis (1999)
- Prima Iubire (2000)
- Am Să-mi Fac De Cap (2000)
- The Best Of (Andre album) (2001)
- O Noapte Și-o Zi (2001)

=== Solo albums ===
- AndreEA (2002)
- Când dansam (2003)
- Metamorfoza (2005)
