= CRBL =

Romanian rapper

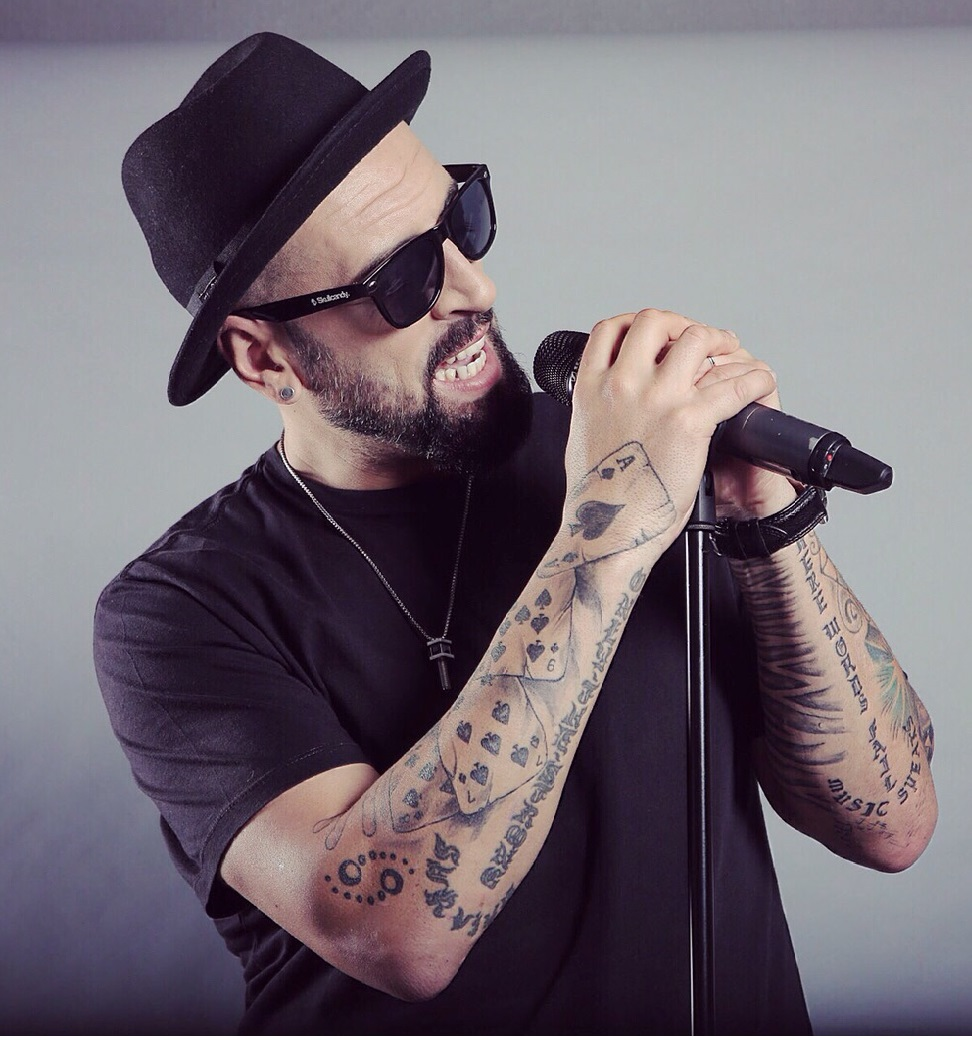

Background information
- Born: Eduard Mihail Andreianu; 30 June 1978 (age 48)
- Origin: Pitești, Romania
- Genre: Hip hop
- Occupation: Rapper
- Instrument: vocals
- Years active: 1994–present
- Labels: Cat Music, Roton Music, Media Pro Music
- Website: crbl.ro

Eduard Mihail Andreianu (born 30 June 1978), better known by his stage name CRBL is a Romanian rapper, choreographer, dancer, actor, music producer, and film director. He became well-known in 2000 as a member of the band Simplu,with which he released eight albums. He began his solo career in 2010 with the song "Românu' n-are noroc," for which he received a nomination at the 2011 Romanian Music Awards.

== Career ==
CRBL began his career as a dancer and choreographer in the modern dance group Trivale in 1994. Together with the group, he won numerous awards at dance competitions. The dance group "Protest" was founded in 1998, with CRBL as a founding member. In 1999, the group changed its name to "Mesaj Nou." In 2000, "Mesaj Nou" merged with the group "Extreme," giving rise to the band "Simplu". The original line-up included CRBL, Piticu, Francezu, Omu Negru, Taz, and Bebico. Simplu released their first album, "X-trem", in 2001. This was followed by "Oare știi", "Zece", "RMX Simplu", "Best of", "Oficial îmi merge bine", "Puppets", and "Dance or Die Trying".

In 2004, he successfully opened his own dance studio specializing in breakdance and streetdance and formed a new dance crew, Big Bounce, with which he won numerous breakdance and streetdance competitions.

CRBL has been a part of the TV show Dansez pentru tine (Dancing for You), where he met his wife. In 2011, he was part of the jury for the first season of the Megastar show.

== Top songs ==
- Petre (feat Adda)
- Kboom
- Plânge sufletul meu (feat Anlora)
- Bună dimineața (feat Denise)
- Toată țara (feat Ruby)

== Filmography ==
- Trolls World Tour (2020) – (voice)
- Stolen Princess (2018) – Mr. cat (voice)
- Ploey – You Never Fly Alon (2018) – father (voce)
- Despicable Me 3 / Sunt un mic ticălos 3 (2017) – Balthazar Bratt
- 13 Shades of Romanian / 13 Shades of Romanian (2016) – CRBL
- Furia (2002) – Parse
