= Strange Talk =

Australian musical duo

- Origin: Melbourne, Victoria, Australia
- Genres: Synthpop, indietronica, new wave
- Years active: 2010–present
- Labels: Neon Gold, Fine Time, Sony, Wind-Up Records
- Members: Stephen Docker; Gerard Sidhu
- Website: strangetalkmusic.com

Strange Talk is an Australian synthpop duo from Melbourne, Victoria, consisting of Gerard Sidhu and Stephen Docker. Formed in 2010, their sound has been likened to that of Cut Copy, Passion Pit, Phoenix and Yeasayer. Strange Talk's most recent EP, E.V.O.L.U.T.I.O.N, was released on 16 October 2015 via Wind-up Records. On 17 September 2021, Strange Talk released Speech Therapy, the band's most recent album which was independently released.

== History ==
Strange Talk launched into the public eye when they rose to the top as a featured artist during the 2010 Triple J Unearthed competition. In April 2011 they released their self-titled EP through Neon Gold Records and Fine Time Records which featured the singles "Climbing Walls" and "Eskimo Boy". The group reached number one on Billboard's Uncharted chart for 17 September 2011 and the music video for "Climbing Walls" reached almost 400,000 YouTube views between August and September.

Strange Talk's debut studio album, Cast Away, was released on 8 February 2013 by Fine Time and Sony Music Australia. It charted at number fifty-six on the Australian Albums Chart.

The group has supported international acts The Rapture and Art vs. Science and performed alongside many others at Parklife, Good Vibrations, Playground Weekender, Future Music Festival, and Falls Festival.

The band signed with Wind-up Records for the rest of the world and released their debut album Cast Away in 2014.

In 2015 the group returned to the original duo format with principle members Gerard Sidhu and Stephen Docker remaining. On 16 October 2015 the group released their latest EP, E.V.O.L.U.T.I.O.N, via Wind-Up Records. The release is noted as a return to Strange Talk's electronic and dance oriented roots.

In 2021, Strange Talk released their first album in 9 years titled Speech Therapy. For the first time, the album was released independently.

== Media ==
- Strange Talk's music has featured in television shows such as 90210, Offspring, Made in Chelsea' and The Shire.
- The song "Eskimo Boy" was featured on the soundtrack for the video game Real Racing 3.
- The song "Cast Away" was featured on the soundtrack for the video game Need For Speed: Most Wanted.
- In April 2012 Strange Talk performed at the Emporio Armani store launch in Sydney.
- The song "Morning Sun" was featured on the soundtrack for the movie That Awkward Moment.
- The song “Climbing Walls” was featured in the 2012 video game Sleeping Dogs.

== Discography ==
=== Studio albums ===
Title	Year	Label
Cast Away	2014	Wind-up Records
Speech Therapy	2021	Self-published

=== EPs ===
Title	Year	Label
Strange Talk	2011	Neon Gold Records
E.V.O.L.U.T.I.O.N.	2015	Wind-up Records

=== Singles ===
Title	Year	Album
"Eskimo Boy"	2011	Cast Away
"Climbing Walls"	2011	Cast Away
"Sexual Lifestyle"	2011	Cast Away
"Cast Away"	2012	Cast Away
"Falling in Love"	2012	Cast Away
"Young Hearts"	2014	Cast Away
"Somethings 'Bout To Change"	2015	E.V.O.L.U.T.I.O.N. (EP)
"When It Feels So Good"	2015	E.V.O.L.U.T.I.O.N. (EP)
"Painted in Gold"	2015	E.V.O.L.U.T.I.O.N. (EP)
"Jive"	2015	E.V.O.L.U.T.I.O.N. (EP)
"So in Love"	2015	E.V.O.L.U.T.I.O.N. (EP)
"Y.O.U.N.G.H.E.A.R.T.S."	2016	Y.O.U.N.G.H.E.A.R.T.S.
"Cosmic Synchronicity"	2018	Non-album single
"Stick By You"	2019	Speech Therapy
"Down Low"	2021	Speech Therapy
"Love Elevation"	2021	Speech Therapy
"Starlight" (Ft. CM)	2021	Speech Therapy
"The Good Days"	2021	Speech Therapy
"Diamond Eyes" (with Gregory Dillon)	2023	Non-album single

=== Remixes ===
Artist	Title	Year
The Naked and Famous	"Young Blood"	2011
Muscles	"Girls Go Crazy"	2011
The Temper Trap	"Trembling Hands"	2011
Foster the People	"I Would Do Anything for You"	2012
Futurecop!	"Coming Home"	2013
Dance Yourself Clean	"Sugar"	2021
