= Claudia Pavel =

Romanian pop singer and dancer

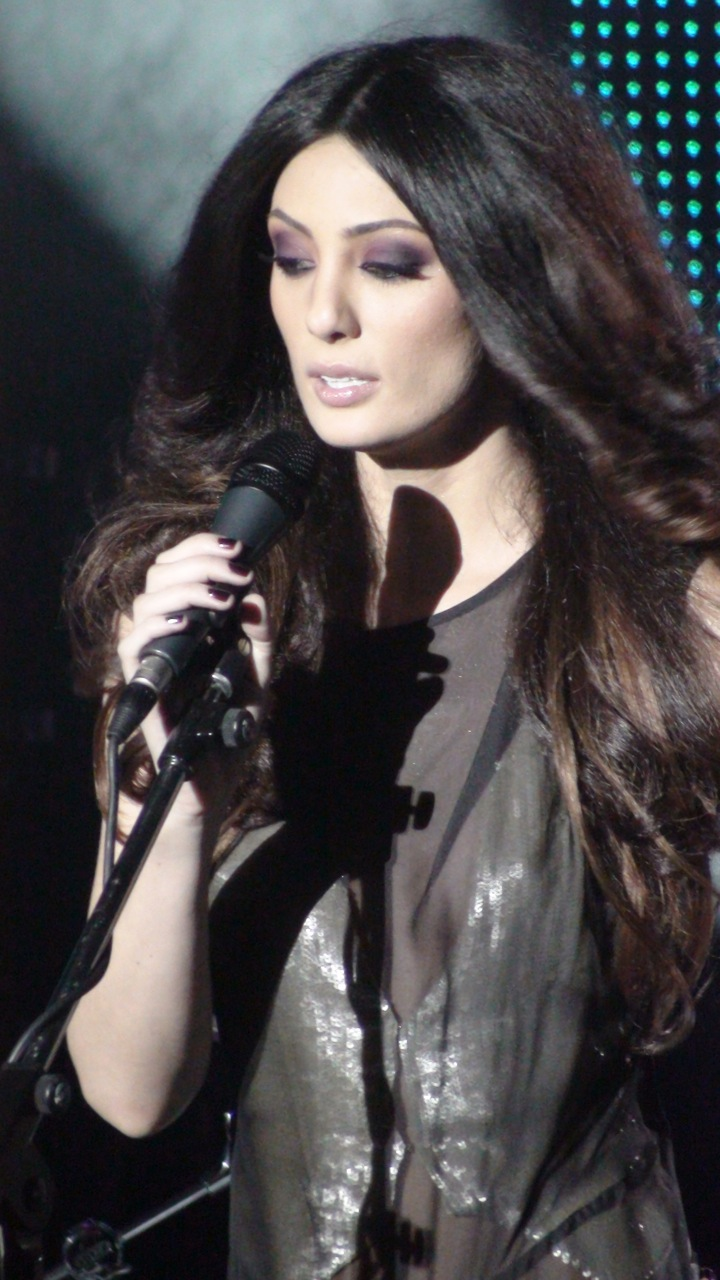
- Claudia Pavel

Background information
- Also known as: Claudia Cream, Cream
- Born: Claudia Pavel; October 19, 1984 (age 41)
- Origin: Mangalia, Romania
- Genres: Pop, Dance, R&B
- Occupations: Singer-songwriter, dancer, actress, journalist, Phd Student
- Instrument: Piano
- Years active: 2000–present
- Website: claudiapavel.com

Claudia Pavel (born October 19, 1984, in Mangalia), also known as Claudia Cream or simply Cream, is a Romanian pop singer and dancer. Pavel has had a string of hit music albums and music singles in Romania and is considered one of Romania's most successful and popular singers of the 2000s. Pavel speaks fluent Romanian, Greek, and English, along with some Turkish. Claudia Pavel was vying to represent Romania in the Eurovision Song Contest 2011 in Germany with the entry "I Want U to Want Me", in the national final on December 31, 2010, she came in 10th place.

Pavel has also been a member of pop group "Candy".

== Music albums (with Candy) ==
- Candy (2000)

== Music albums (as solo singer) ==
- Crede în mine (2002)
- Aștept (2003)
- Te vreau (2005)
- 48 de ore (2006)
- Wrong Girl for That (2009)

== Music singles (in selection) ==
- Mai aproape (2002)
- Cânt pentru tine (2002)
- Închide ochii (feat. Marius Moga) (2003)
- Jumătatea mea (feat. Simplu) (2004)
- Nu din prima seară (feat. CRBL) (2005)
- Cântecul inimii (2006)
- Știu ce-ți place (Vanilla Cream) (feat. Matteo) (2006)
- Candy (2008)
- Just a Little Bit (feat. Fatman Scoop) (2009)
- Don't Miss Missing You (2009)
