= Dirtie Blonde =

American rock group

- Genres: Rock, Pop
- Years active: 2005—2007
- Labels: Jive Records
- Past members: Amie Miriello; Jay Dmuchoski; Dean Moore; Tim Perez; Sean Kipe

Dirtie Blonde was a rock band that consisted of vocalist Amie Miriello, acoustic guitarist Jay Dmuchowski, lead guitarist Sean Kipe, bassist Dean Moore and drummer Tim Perez. The band released the single "Walk Over Me" from their self-titled album in the spring of 2006 on the Jive Records label. Dirtie Blonde toured the U.S. throughout 2006, opening for artists such as INXS and Teddy Geiger.

Miriello now performs under her own name; a second album for Jive was reportedly close to completion as of early 2008. Sean Kipe now plays lead guitar for the rock band Course of Nature.

== Ensemble ==
- Amie Miriello - Vocals
- Jay Dmuchowski - Guitar
- Sean Kipe - Guitar
- Dean Moore - Bass
- Tim Perez - Drums
