= Morandi (band) =

Romanian Eurodance music group

- Origin: Bucharest, Romania
- Genres: Europop; dance; synthpop
- Years active: 2004–2021; 2024–present
- Labels: Roton Music, Universal Music Romania
- Members: Marius Moga; Andrei Ropcea (Randi)
- Website: morandi-music.com

Morandi is a Romanian eurodance music group composed of Marius Moga and Andrei Ropcea (Randi).

== Career ==
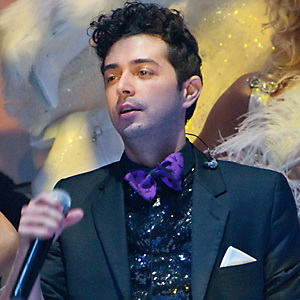
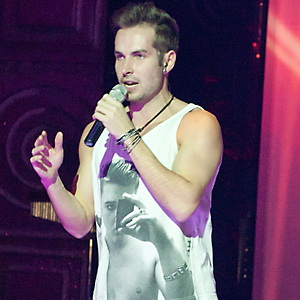
From left to right: Moga and Randi performing in 2011

=== 2004–2005: Career beginnings and Reverse ===
The duo was formed in September 2004 by Marius Moga and Randi and released their debut single "Love Me" in November of that year. Their debut album, Reverse was released on 17 July 2005 and received a gold certification from the UPFR in December. As of December 2021, the album has sold two million copies worldwide. "Beijo (Uh La La)", which served as the second single from the album, topped the Romanian Top 100 for nine weeks.

=== 2006–2008: Mind Fields and N3XT ===
The duo expanded and became a group, adding a percussionist and two disc jockeys. Mindfields, the group's second album, was released in March 2006. Two singles were promoted off the album, "Falling Asleep" and "A la lujeba", both reaching number one in Romania. In July 2007, the group released the lead single off their third album, titled "Afrika", which peaked at number two in Romania. "Angels (Love Is the Answer)" was a commercial success, reaching number one in five countries and being certified seven times platinum in Russia. Their third album, N3XT, was released on 14 December 2007, and received a platinum certification in Romania and was certified four times platinum in Russia. "Save Me" featuring Helene served as the last single off the album, attaining similar success to the previous single.

=== 2009–2011: Zebra ===
In June 2009, the duo announced "Colors" as the lead single off their upcoming fourth album, titled Zebra, which was due for release later that year. "Rock the World" was released as the second single from the album in April 2010, with the duo acknowledging the album's delay. Two more singles were released to promote the album in 2011, specifically "Midnight Train" and "Serenada". In an interview with Urban.ro, Randi stated that Morandi will take a hiatus, and that the album was due for release in December 2011.

=== 2012–2021: Hiatus and single releases ===
The duo returned to the music scene in 2013 with "Everytime We Touch". They proceeded to release two more singles before taking another hiatus at the end of 2014. In November 2016, Morandi came back by releasing "Keep You Safe". The duo released two more singles, "Kalinka" (2018) and "Professional Liar" (2019) and in 2021, they parted ways. In October 2024, Randi confirmed that he and Moga had reunited to make music as Morandi.

== Discography ==
=== Studio albums ===
List of studio albums, with sales and certifications
Title	Album details	Sales	Certifications
Reverse	Released: 17 July 2005; Label: Roton; Format: CD, digital download, streaming	WW: 2,000,000 (Note: Sales of Reverse as of December 2021.); ROM: 35,000 (Note: Sales of Reverse in Romania as of December 2005.)	UPFR: Gold
Mind Fields	Released: March 2006; Label: Roton; Format: CD, digital download, streaming		
N3XT	Released: 14 December 2007; Label: Universal Music Romania; Format: CD, digital download, streaming		UPFR: Platinum; NFPF: 4× Platinum

=== Compilations ===
List of compilations, with selected chart positions
Title	Album details	Peak chart positions
Title	Album details	GRE
Best Of	Released: 2011; Label: Universal Music Romania; Format: CD, digital download, streaming	26

=== Singles ===
List of singles, with selected chart positions
Title	Year	Peak chart positions										Certifications	Album
Title	Year	ROM Air. (Note: Notes concerning the Romanian peaks: Due to the lack of national chart Romanian Top 100 archives for the late 2000s, the airplay charts published at that time by Nielsen Music Control and Uniunea Producătorilor de Fonograme din România (UPFR) are taken into consideration for "Colors" and "Save Me". It is unknown whether the two were affiliated with the Romanian Top 100, however their charts are reliable.; Airplay 100 replaced the Romanian Top 100 in 2012 after the latter chart ceased its weekly issuing.; Media Forest Domestic Airplay Top 10 is used since 2023 after the latter chart ceased its weekly issuing.; The TopHit Romania Airplay chart inaugurated in January 2023, is taken into consideration for Romanian peaks below The Top 25 interchangeably with the UPFR charts.)	BUL Air.	CIS Air.	CZE Air.	FRA	LAT Air.	MDA Air.	POL Air.	RUS Air.	SVK Air.	Certifications	Album
"Love Me"	2004	2	—	—	—	—	*	*	—	—	—		Reverse
"Beijo (Uh-La-La)"	2005	1	—	—	—	—	*	*	—	—	54		Reverse
"Falling Asleep"	2006	1	—	—	—	—	*	*	—	—	—		Mindfields
"A La Lujeba"	2006	1	—	54	—	—	*	*	—	—	—		Mindfields
"Afrika"	2007	2	—	105	—	—	*	*	—	161	—		N3XT
"Angels (Love Is the Answer)"	2007	1	—	1	1	16	*	*	1	1	1	NFPF: 7× Platinum	N3XT
"Save Me" (featuring Helene)	2008	1	1	1	1	—	*	*	1	1	13		N3XT
"Сolors"	2009	7	4	1	4	—	*	*	—	1	1		Best Of
"Rock the World"	2010	46	—	47	42	—	*	*	—	44	30		Best Of
"Midnight Train"	2011	53	—	6	—	—	*	*	—	4	23		Best Of
"Serenada"	2011	—	—	—	—	—	*	*	—	—	—		Non-album singles
"Everytime We Touch"	2013	48	—	47	—	—	*	*	—	48	—		Non-album singles
"Living Without You"	2014	—	—	—	—	—	*	*	—	—	—		Non-album singles
"Summer in December" (featuring Inna)	2014	80	—	—	—	—	*	*	—	—	—		Inna / Body and the Sun
"Keep You Safe"	2016	—	5	—	—	—	—	*	—	—	—		Non-album singles
"Kalinka"	2018	—	—	—	—	—	—	*	31	—	—	ZPAV: Platinum	Non-album singles
"Professional Liar"	2019	—	—	—	—	—	—	*	—	—	—		Non-album singles
"No Sleep" (with Eneli)	2024	12	—	—	48	—	—	—	—	—	62		Non-album singles
"Miss Cali (Hallelujah)"	2026	14	2	63	39	—	6	34	—	102	99		Non-album singles
"Samba"	2026	71	8	26	—	—	7	31	—	26	—		Non-album singles
"—" denotes a recording that did not chart or was not released in that territory. "*" denotes that the chart did not exist at that time.

== Awards and nominations ==
Year	Award	Category	Recipient	Result	Ref.
2005	2005 MTV Europe Music Awards	Best Romanian Act	Morandi	Nominated	
2005	MTV Romania Music Awards 2005	Best Dance	Morandi	Won	
2005	MTV Romania Music Awards 2005	Best New Act	Morandi	Nominated	
2005	MTV Romania Music Awards 2005	Best Song	"Love Me"	Nominated	
2006	2006 MTV Europe Music Awards	Best Romanian Act	Morandi	Nominated	
2006	MTV Romania Music Awards 2006	Best Album	Reverse	Nominated	
2006	MTV Romania Music Awards 2006	Best Dance	"Beijo (Uh La La)"	Nominated	
2006	MTV Romania Music Awards 2006	Best Song	"Beijo (Uh La La)"	Won	
2006	MTV Romania Music Awards 2006	Best Video	"Falling Asleep"	Won	
2006	Radio România Actualităţi Awards 2006	Best Pop-Dance Album	Reverse	Nominated	
2006	Radio România Actualităţi Awards 2006	Best Pop-Dance Group	Morandi	Nominated	
2006	Radio România Actualităţi Awards 2006	Best Pop-Dance Song	"Beijo (Uh La La)"	Won	
2007	Radio România Actualităţi Awards 2007	Best Pop-Dance Album	Mind Fields	Won	
2007	Radio România Actualităţi Awards 2007	Best Pop-Dance Group	Morandi	Nominated	
2007	Radio România Actualităţi Awards 2007	Best Pop-Dance Song	"Falling Asleep"	Nominated	
2008	2008 MTV Europe Music Awards	Best Romanian Act	Morandi	Won	
2008	Romanian Music Awards 2008	Best Album	N3XT	Won	
2008	Romanian Music Awards 2008	Best Dance	"Save Me"	Nominated	
2008	Romanian Music Awards 2008	Best Group	Morandi	Nominated	
2008	Romanian Music Awards 2008	Best Pop	Morandi	Nominated	
2008	Romanian Music Awards 2008	Best Song	"Angels (Love Is the Answer)"	Nominated	
2008	Romanian Music Awards 2008	Best Video	"Angels (Love Is the Answer)"	Won	
2008	Radio România Actualităţi Awards 2008	Best Pop-Dance Album	N3XT	Nominated	
2008	Radio România Actualităţi Awards 2008	Best Pop-Dance Artist	Morandi	Nominated	
2008	Radio România Actualităţi Awards 2008	Best Pop-Dance Song	"Afrika"	Nominated	
2009	Eska Music Awards	Best International Hit	"Angels (Love Is the Answer)"	Won	
2010	Radio România Actualităţi Awards 2010	Best Pop-Dance Artist	Morandi	Nominated	
2010	Radio România Actualităţi Awards 2010	Best Pop-Dance Song	"Colors"	Nominated	

== See also ==
- List of music released by Romanian artists that has charted in major music markets
