= Bravo (Romanian magazine) =

Romanian teens' magazine

- Miley Cyrus in front of the cover of the first 2010 issue.
- Editor-in-Chief: Cristian Constantin
- Categories: Teenage
- Frequency: Bimonthly
- Publisher: Ringier Romania
- Paid circulation: 445.041 (Q1/2007)
- Total circulation: 619.100 (Q1/2007)
- Founded: 1997
- Final issue: April 2014
- Company: Heinrich Bauer Zeitschriften Verlag KG
- Country: Romania
- Language: Romanian

Bravo was a Romanian teens' magazine, the Romanian version of the German original format. It was published bimonthly between 1997 and 2014.

== History ==
The first issue of Bravo was published in 1997. The print edition of the magazine ceased publication in April 2014.

== Content ==
The magazine covered most current news, gossips and rumours. It included the "Loser v Winner corner", in which there are presented some gestures or projects of fellow worldwide artists, comparing one to each other. It also featured the "Star - Duel", where the editors compare two artists, shows, films or series which are from the same domain.

Starting with August, 2009, the readers had the freedom to choose their own favourite artists to appear on a poster or wallpaper, by sending a text via SMS.

It featured an exclusive interview with an international superstar, such as Sugababes, Zac Efron or Justin Bieber. The magazine also included breaking news about the most recent or upcoming films and TV series, and new DVD releases.

The BRAVO Top 20, or BRAVO CHARTS was the reader's chart. They can vote online on bravonet.ro their favourite songs, from a shortlist of 50 songs. The chart was mediated twice a month.
