= Loredana Groza =

Romanian musician (born 1970)

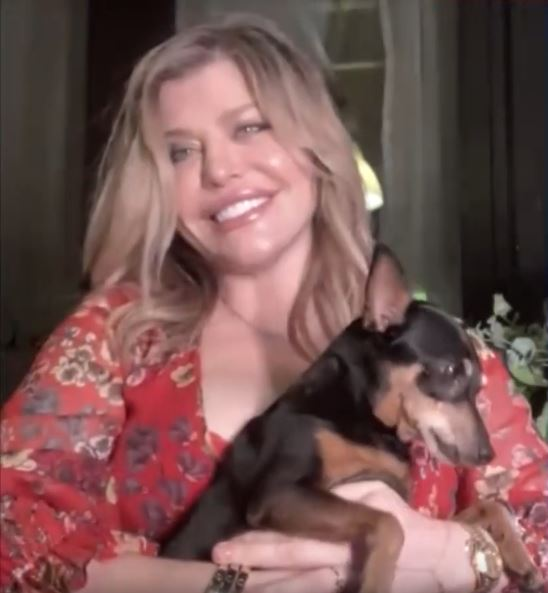
- Groza in 2020

Background information
- Born: 10 June 1970 (age 56); Gheorghe Gheorghiu-Dej (now Onești), Romania
- Genres: Pop; pop rock; dance-pop; soul; manele; traditional
- Occupation: Singer
- Instrument: Vocals
- Years active: 1986–present
- Label: MediaPro
- Spouse: Andrei Boncea (m. 1998; div. 2021)

Loredana Groza (born 10 June 1970), also known mononymously as Loredana, is a Romanian singer. She is known for continuously reinventing herself and for approaching numerous music styles throughout her discography, ranging from pop to traditional music and manele. In 1987, Groza released her debut single "Bună seara, iubito" ("Good Evening, Love!"), which—even though it was banned and censored in Romania for alleged inappropriate lyrics—became successful and one of her signature songs. Her album of the same name would go on to sell 1.5 million copies, making it the best-selling record of all time in Romania. Over the years, Groza released several acclaimed albums and hit songs, including "Apa" in 2012, which reached number two on the native Airplay 100 chart. The singer was a coach on the Romanian version of the televised competition The Voice for its first seven seasons.

== Life and career ==
Loredana Groza was born in Gheorghe Gheorghiu-Dej (now known as Onești), Romania, on 10 June 1970. She started singing at the age of three and continued to sing throughout her school years. When she was 14, she was noticed by composers Dumitru Moroșanu and Zsolt Kerestely, who invited her to Bucharest for the talent show Steaua fără nume (The Star Without a Name) although she was too young, as the minimum admission age was 17. She competed in the talent show in 1986, at 16 years old, and won the big prize. In the same year, she competed in the Mamaia Music Festival, where she was awarded the best newcomer prize, which made her the youngest winner ever.

In 1987, at the Costinești Music Festival, she met the acclaimed composer Adrian Enescu, who wrote the song "O inimă de 16 ani" ("A 16-Year-Old Heart") for her; this was followed by an entire record, her debut album Bună seara, iubito! (Good Evening, Love!) (1988). Although the title song was not broadcast on Romanian television because of the communist censorship, both the song and the album were huge successes, with the latter being sold in 1.5 million copies. In 1989, Enescu and Lucian Avramescu produced her second album, Un buchet de trandafiri (A Bouquet of Roses), which was also successful. After a career hiatus until 1994, Groza made a comeback with the album Atitudine (Attitude) and toured Romania with the band Direcția 5 in 1995. 1995 was also the release year of the album Născută toamna (Born in Autumn), whilst the gold-certified Tomilio followed in 1996. In 1998, Groza released the hugely successful hit single "Lumea e a mea" with B.U.G. Mafia.

Groza appeared on the cover of Playboy magazine in 2000, which sold out and confirmed her status of a sex symbol. In 2001, Enescu and the singer worked together again for the album Diva înamorată. Two albums inspired by traditional music followed in 2001 and 2002: Agurida, and Zarza, vânzătoarea de plăceri (Zarza, the Pleasure Seller). From 2003 to 2006, Groza released the albums Fata cu șosete de diamant (The Girl with Diamond Socks), Extravaganza, and Jamparalele. The latter received a gold certification for sales in Romania and included Groza's successful hit single "Lele", with which she attempted to represent Romania at the Eurovision Song Contest 2005. She had previously taken part in the Romanian national final for the contest in 1994 and 1996 with the songs "Nu adio" ("Not Goodbye") and "Visăm America" ("We Dream of America"), respectively. In 2012, Groza released her highest-charting single on national charts, "Apa", which reached number two on the Airplay 100. In 2014, she premiered another top 10 hit, "Risipitor" ("Wasteful").

Groza was chosen to dub the singing voice of Gloria in Happy Feet Two and Barbara Gordon in Lego Batman: The Movie.

== Personal life ==
Loredana was married to the television producer Andrei Boncea. They have a daughter, Elena.

== Discography ==
=== Albums ===
==== Studio albums ====
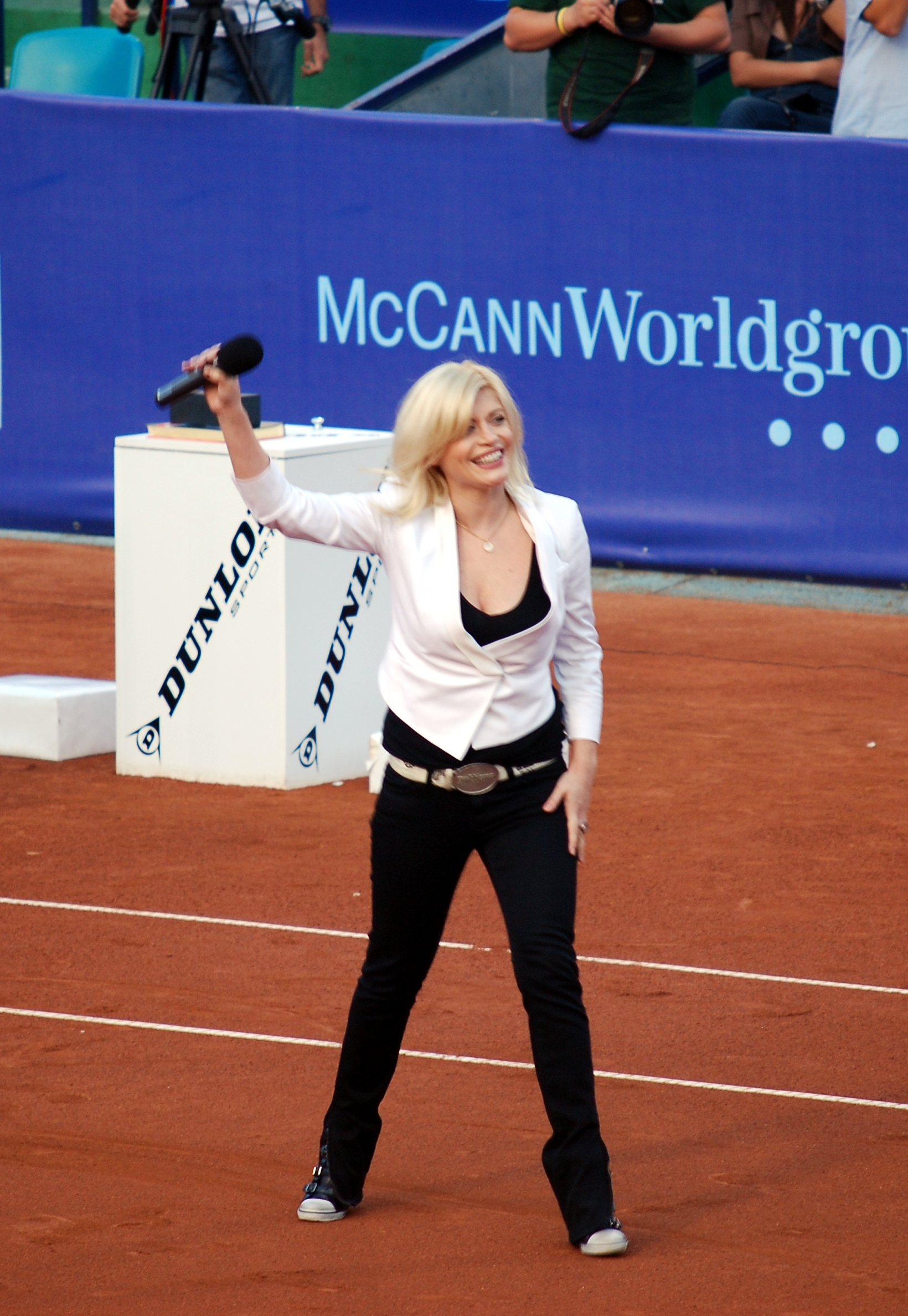
Groza in 2009 at Andrei Pavel's retirement tennis match.

List of studio albums, with sales and certifications
Title	Album details	Sales and certifications
Bună seara, iubito!	Released: 1988; Label: Electrecord; Formats: Cassette, LP	ROM: 1,500,000
Un buchet de trandafiri	Released: 1989; Label: Electrecord; Formats: Cassette, LP	
Atitudine	Released: 1994; Label: Disim Conpro; Formats: Cassette	
Născută toamna	Released: 1995; Label: Sabrina; Formats: CD, cassette, LP	
Tomilio	Released: 1996; Label: Electrecord; Formats: CD, cassette, digital download	UPFR: Gold
Agurida – Cele mai frumoase cântece populare românești	Released: 2001; Label: MediaPro; Formats: CD, cassette, digital download	
Fata cu șosete de diamant	Released: 2003; Label: Loredana, MediaPro; Formats: CD, cassette, digital download	
Zig-Zagga Extravaganza	Released: 2004; Label: MediaPro; Formats: CD, cassette, digital download	
Jamparalele	Released: 2006; Label: MediaPro; Formats: CD, cassette, digital download	UPFR: Gold
Made in Romanie	Released: 2007; Label: MediaPro; Formats: CD, digital download	
Tzuki	Released: 2008; Label: Acasă, MediaPro; Formats: CD, digital download	
Sundance	Released: May 2009; Label: MediaPro; Formats: CD, digital download	
Iubiland	Released: 2010; Label: MediaPro; Formats: CD, digital download	
Dragoste	Released: 16 November 2012; Label: MediaPro; Formats: CD, digital download	
Imaginarium	Released: 26 October 2015; Label: MediaPro; Formats: CD, digital download	

==== Live albums ====
List of live albums
Title	Album details
Zarza, vânzătoarea de plăceri	Released: 2002; Label: Loredana, MediaPro; Formats: CD, cassette, digital download

==== Other albums ====
List of other albums
Title	Album details
Nana Nanino	Released: 29 September 2007; Label: MediaPro; Formats: CD, digital download
Cântece pentru îngerași (with Mihai Constantinescu and Simona Secrier)	Released: 2008; Label: MediaPro; Formats: CD, digital download
Agurida XX	Released: 2020; Label: Digster; Formats: Digital download; Note: Released as a playlist

==== Compilation albums ====
List of compilation albums
Title	Album details
My Love	Released: 2007; Label: MediaPro; Formats: CD, cassette, digital download; Features selected new songs
Loredana	Released: 28 July 2008; Label: Intercont; Formats: CD
Ador	Released: 2017; Label: MediaPro; Formats: CD, digital download

==== Remix albums ====
List of remix albums
Title	Album details
Rain Rain Remixed	Released: 30 November 2010; Label: Warner; Formats: Digital download

==== Extended plays ====
List of extended plays
Title	Album details
Aromaroma	Released: 1999; Label: MediaPro; Formats: CD, cassette
Diva inamorata	Released: 2000; Label: MediaPro; Formats: CD, cassette, digital download
Santa Baby	Released: 29 November 2021; Label: Universal; Formats: Digital download

=== Singles ===
==== As lead artist ====
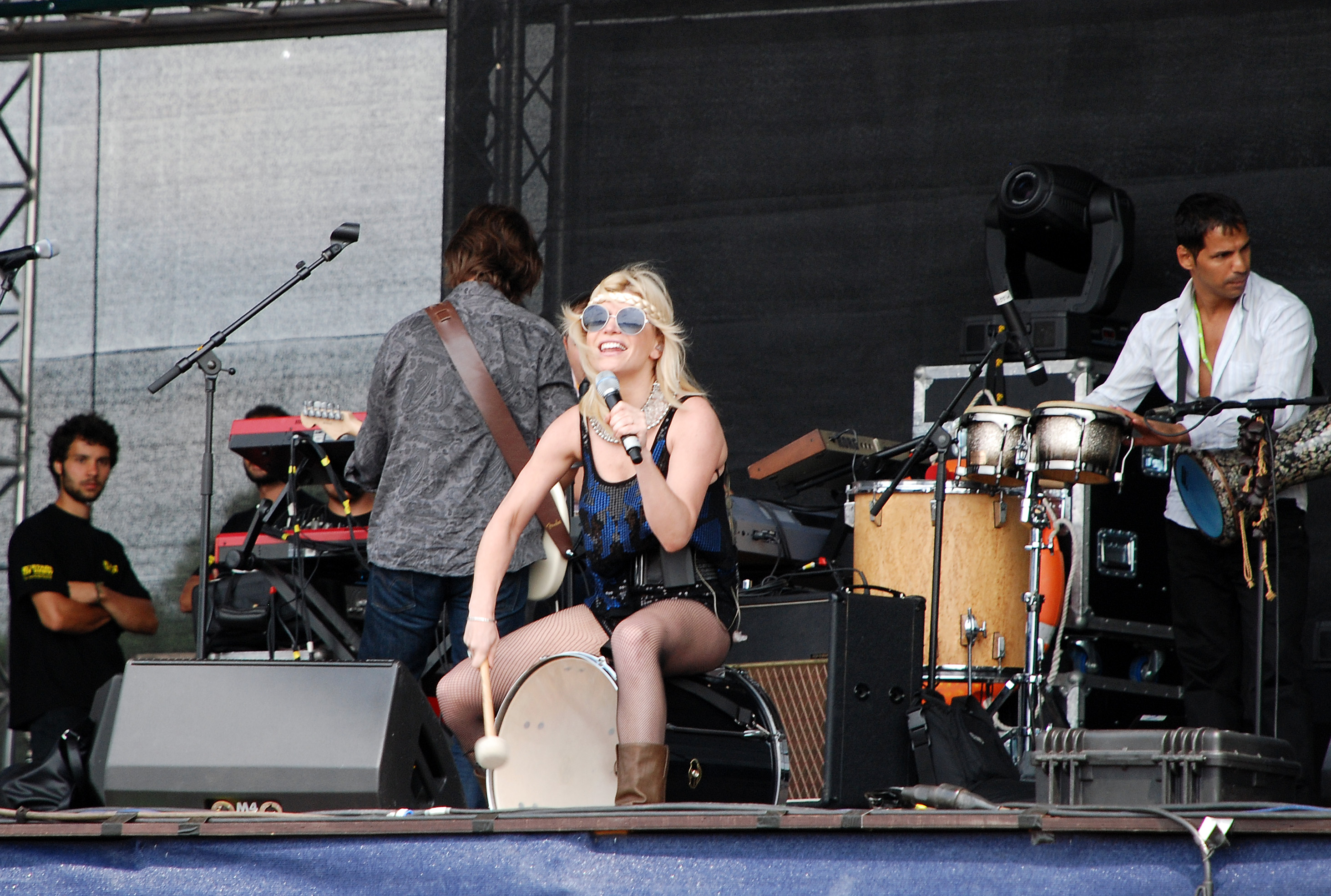
Groza at Linz Europa Hafenfest in July 2009

List of singles as lead artist, with selected chart positions and sales
Title	Year	Peak chart positions		Sales	Album
Title	Year	ROM (Note: The Airplay 100 replaced the Romanian Top 100 as Romania's national chart in February 2012 after the latter ceased its weekly issuing, but ended itself in November 2021.)	MDA	Sales	Album
"Bună seara, iubito!"	1987	—	—		Bună seara, iubito!
"Îți citesc în ochi"	1988	—	—		Bună seara, iubito!
"Ce va fi cu iubirea mea"	1992	—	—		Non-album singles
"Poate că astăzi, poate că mâine... mă voi îndrăgosti!" (with Aurelian Temișan)	1994	—	—		Non-album singles
"Nu-mi pasă" (featuring Direcția 5)	1995	—	—		Zig-Zagga Extravaganza
"Ești genul meu"	1997	—	—		Zig-Zagga Extravaganza
"Lumea e a mea" (featuring B.U.G. Mafia)	1998	—	—	ROM: 50,000	Non-album single
"Aromaroma"	1999	—	—		Aromaroma
"Diva inamorata"	2001	—	—		Diva inamorata
"Femeia ta"	2003	18	—		Fata cu șosete de diamant
"Suflet drag"	2003	20	—		Fata cu șosete de diamant / Zig-Zagga Extravaganza
"Zig-Zagga"	2004	24	—		Zig-Zagga Extravaganza
"Extravaganza"	2004	13	—		Zig-Zagga Extravaganza
"Lele"	2005	29	—		Jamparalele
"Dus de vânt" (with Eric Colas)	2005	71	—		Non-album single
"Vreau toată noaptea"	2006	35	—		Jamparalele
"Cât îi Maramureșul"	2006	—	—		Jamparalele
"Depărtare"	2006	81	—		Jamparalele
"Șatra în asfințit" (featuring Connect-R)	2007	—	—		Made in Romanie
"Made in Romanie" (featuring Connect-R)	2007	—	—		Made in Romanie
"Regina" (featuring Connect-R)	2008	—	—		Tzuki
"Tzuki"	2008	—	—		Tzuki
"Like a Rock Star"	2009	—	—		Sundance
"Rain Rain"	2010	—	—		Dragoste
"Monalisa" (featuring Jay Ko)	2011	—	—		Non-album single
"Boom Boom Boom"	2011	—	—		Non-album single
"Ochii din vis" (featuring Dragoș Chircu)	2012	—	—		Dragoste
"Apa" (featuring Cabron)	2012	2	4		Dragoste
"Viva Mamaia" (featuring Alex Velea, Cabron and Radu Mazăre)	2013	45	—		Non-album singles
"Nu știu cine ești" (featuring Cornel Ilie)	2013	64	—		Imaginarium
"Risipitor"	2014	10	—		Imaginarium
"Te iubesc" (with Nadir)	2015	44	—		Imaginarium
"Val după val"	2015	—	—		Imaginarium
"Vrei să mă iei" (with Alama)	2016	—	—		Imaginarium
"La cârciuma de la drum" (with Zdob și Zdub featuring Skizzo Skillz)	2016	—	—		Non-album singles
"Unde ești" (with Deepcentral)	2016	—	—		Non-album singles
"Ziua de azi"	2017	—	—		Non-album singles
"Fugit din Rai"	2017	—	—		Non-album singles
"Avatar"	2017	—	—		Non-album singles
"Îngeri"	2018	—	—		Santa Baby
"Dependența mea" (with Voltaj)	2019	—	—		Ca la 20 de ani
"Damdiridam"	2019	—	—		Non-album singles
"Sex pe canapea"	2020	—	—		Non-album singles
"Golan" (with Dl. Goe)	2020	—	—		Non-album singles
"Peste București" (with Christian Eberhard)	2020	—	—		Non-album singles
"Emoțiile"	2021	—	—		Non-album singles
"Bună dimineața" (with Costi and Culiță Sterp featuring Baboiash, Adi de la Vâlcea, Nicu Paleru, Vali Vijelie, Jean de la Craiova and Ștefan de la Bărbulești)	2021	—	—		Non-album singles
"Fericire" (with Jador, Florin Salam and Costi)	2021	—	—		Non-album singles
"Suflet și trup" (with Costi and Jador featuring Baboiash, Adi de la Vâlcea, Nicu Paleru, Vali Vijelie, Jean de la Craiova and Ștefan de la Bărbulești)	2021	—	—		Non-album singles
"Dans, dans, dans"	2022	—	—		Non-album singles
"—" denotes a recording that did not chart or was not released in that territory.

==== As featured artist ====
List of singles as featured artist, with selected chart positions
Title	Year	Peak chart positions	Album
Title	Year	ROM	Album
"Cred că ești extrem de delicată" (Direcția 5 featuring Loredana)	2011	—	Beautiful Jazz Duets
"Fără cuvinte" (B.U.G. Mafia featuring Loredana)	2011	—	Înapoi în viitor
"Lumea ta" (Carla's Dreams featuring Loredana)	2013	30	Ngoc / Imaginarium
"Balkana Mama" (Zdob și Zdub featuring Loredana and Ligalize)	2018	—	Non-album single
"Ce ne pasă nouă?!" (Șatra B.E.N.Z. featuring Loredana)	2019	—	O.$.O.D. IV
"—" denotes a recording that did not chart or was not released in that territory.

==== Promotional singles ====
List of promotional singles
Title	Year	Album
"Copiii sirenelor"	2007	Nana Nanino
"Sexting"	2012	Dragoste
"Santa Baby"	2014	Imaginarium / Santa Baby

=== Guest appearances ===
List of guest appearances
Title	Year	Album
"Vine, vine primăvara"	2003	Cutiuța muzicală 3 (by various artists)
"Rățuștele" (with Mălina Onlinescu and Anca Țurcașiu)	2003	Cutiuța muzicală 3 (by various artists)
"Uf, de i-ar vedea pisica"	2003	Cutiuța muzicală 3 (by various artists)
"Drag mi-e jocul românesc"	2003	Cutiuța muzicală 3 (by various artists)
"Noi cei de acum" (Ștefan Bănică Jr. featuring Loredana)	2005	Duete
"Hot" (Morandi featuring Loredana)	2005	Reverse
"Aripi frânte" (Bitză featuring Loredana)	2005	Sinuciderea unui înger
"Lasă-mă să-ți arăt" (Bitză and Loredana)	2009	Sufletul orașului
"Mama mea e florăreasă" (Damian & Brothers featuring Loredana and Connect-R)	2016	Gypsy Rock: Change or Die

== Filmography ==
=== Movies ===
- Cuibul de viespi (1987)
- Gheonoaia (1998)
- A doua cădere a Constantinopolului (1994)
- Paradisul în direct (1994)
- Supraviețuitorul (2007)
- Fire and Ice: The Dragon Chronicles (2008)
- Assassination Games (2011)
- Minte-mă frumos (2012)

=== Television series ===
- Inimă de țigan (2007–2008)
- Regina (2008–2009)
- Aniela (2009)
- State de România (2010)

=== Other notable appearances ===
- Vocea României (2011–2017)
- X Factor Romania (2019–present)
- Next Star (2020–present)
