= Uniunea Producătorilor de Fonograme din România =

Romanian record industry trade association

Uniunea Producătorilor de Fonograme din România (Ro for Romanian Phonographic Industry is the Romanian record industry's trade association. It also measures the number of physical and digital sales of records in Romania.
