= List of certified albums in Romania =

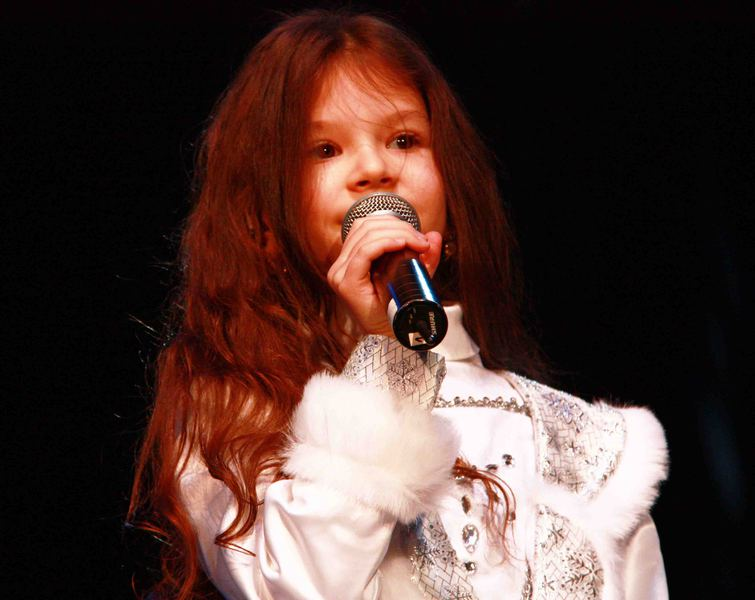
Cleopatra Stratan has the highest-certified album in Romania with La vârsta de trei ani.

Since the late 1990s, more than 70 albums have been certified in Romania in accordance with the certification levels set up by the Uniunea Producătorilor de Fonograme din România (UPFR). Established in 1996, the UPFR is the first Romanian trade association of music producers, with the purpose of promoting the professional interests of its members, as well as being involved in anti-piracy. It has been advised by Monitorul Oficial, the official gazette of Romania, to function as a collective management organisation and collector of compensatory remuneration in the country. Although never publicly defined, the UPFR's certification levels have been repeatedly lowered since their introduction. When considering an album's certification level, the UPFR considers both its unit sales and its sales price. This is atypical when compared to the methods of other organizations. For example, in 2006 an album costing €7 or more would need to achieve 2,000 unit sales to be awarded a gold certification, while one costing less than €7 would need 10,000.

The first known release to be certified in Romania was the album Best Of by Romanian singer Mirabela Dauer, which received a gold certification in 1995. As of 2026, Romania's highest-certified record is La vârsta de trei ani by the Moldovan singer Cleopatra Stratan, which was awarded a triple diamond certification in 2006 for selling 150,000 units. The only other artists to receive a diamond award are Animal X, who received six for their first six albums, and Andra and Sandel Mihai, for selling 60,000 copies of their 2007 album De la frate la soră. From lowest to highest, the certifications that have been awarded over the years are gold, double gold, platinum, double platinum, triple platinum, quadruple platinum, diamond and triple diamond. The artist with the most certified albums is Romanian group Animal X, who has received seven awards. In 2004, three of Bambi's studio albums received a single gold certification, as their combined sales totaled the required 100,000 units. From the late 2000s onwards, sales of albums in Romania have declined, as a result of music piracy and financial crises. Consequently, fewer album certifications have been awarded.

== By certification ==
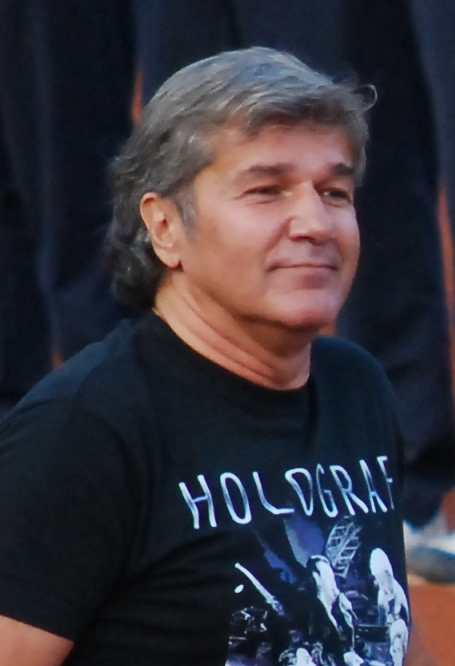
Holograf (lead singer Dan Bittman pictured) have won a total of five awards.

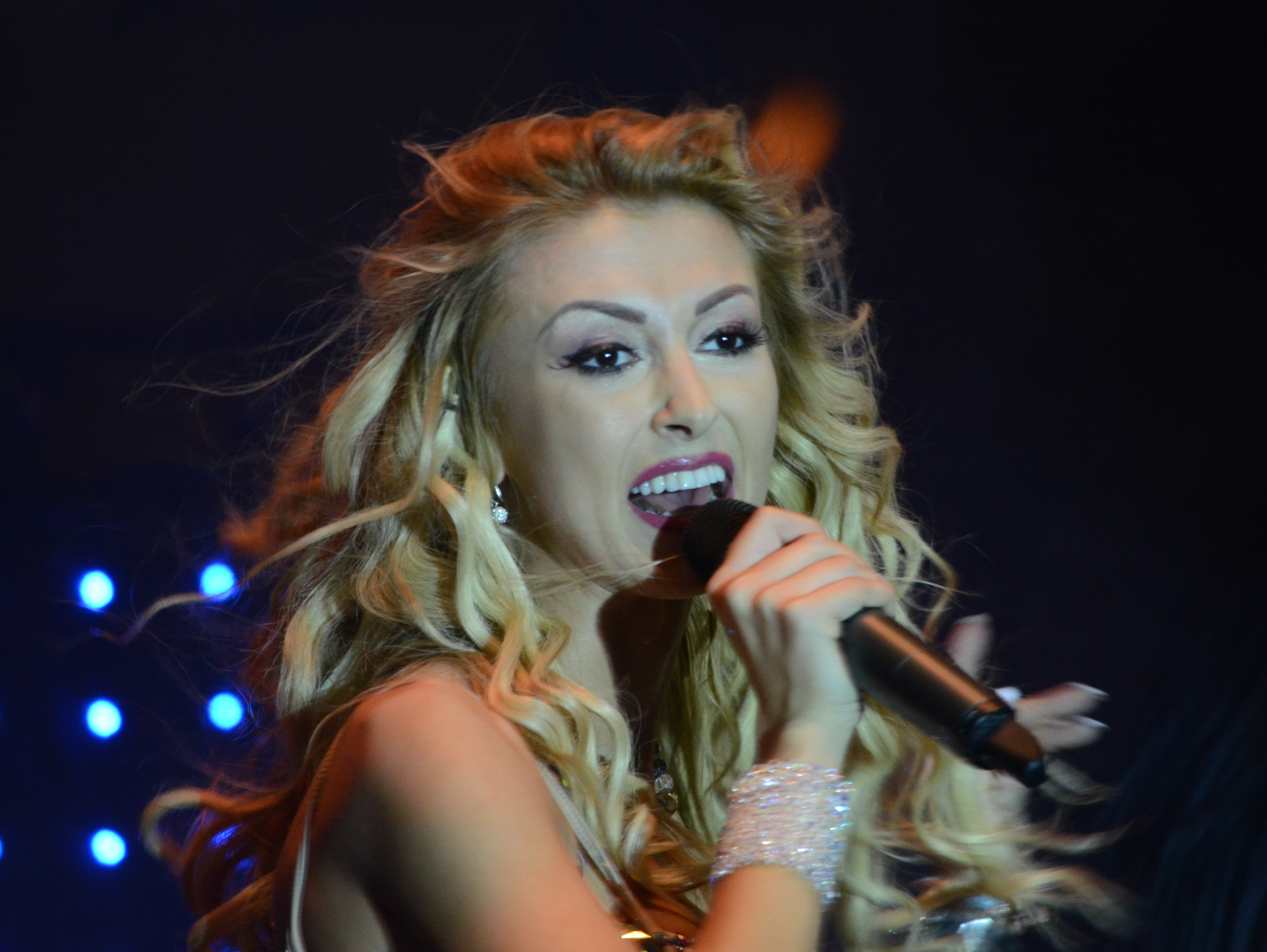
Four of Andrè's (member Andreea Bălan pictured) studio albums were certified platinum in Romania.

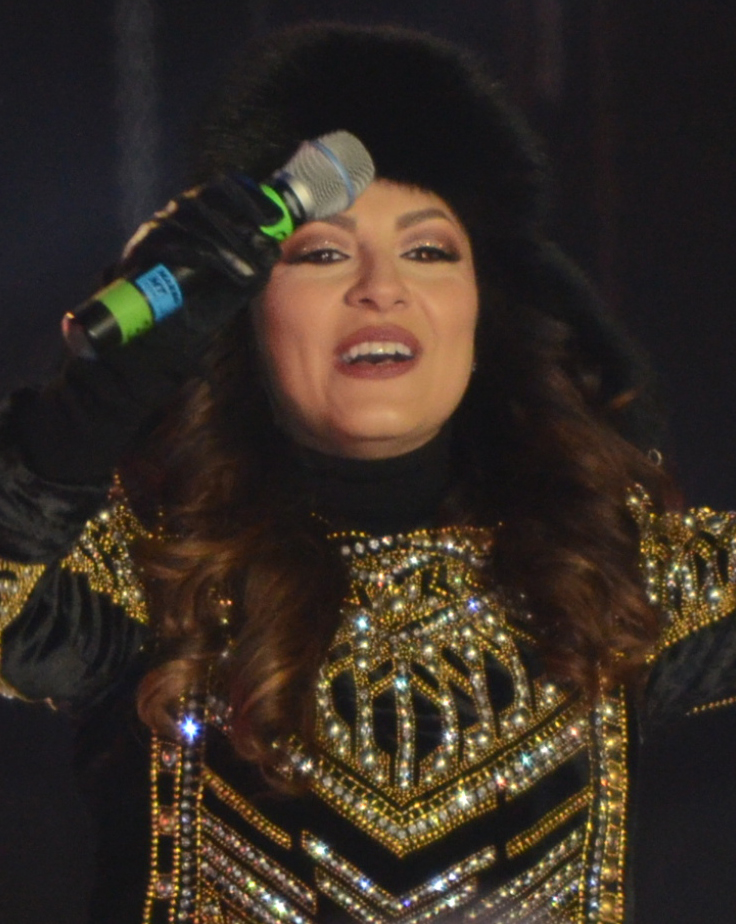
Andra was awarded diamond for De la frate la soră in collaboration with Săndel Mihai.

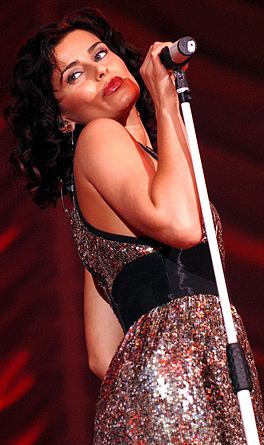
Loose by Nelly Furtado was certified triple platinum in Romania in 2008.

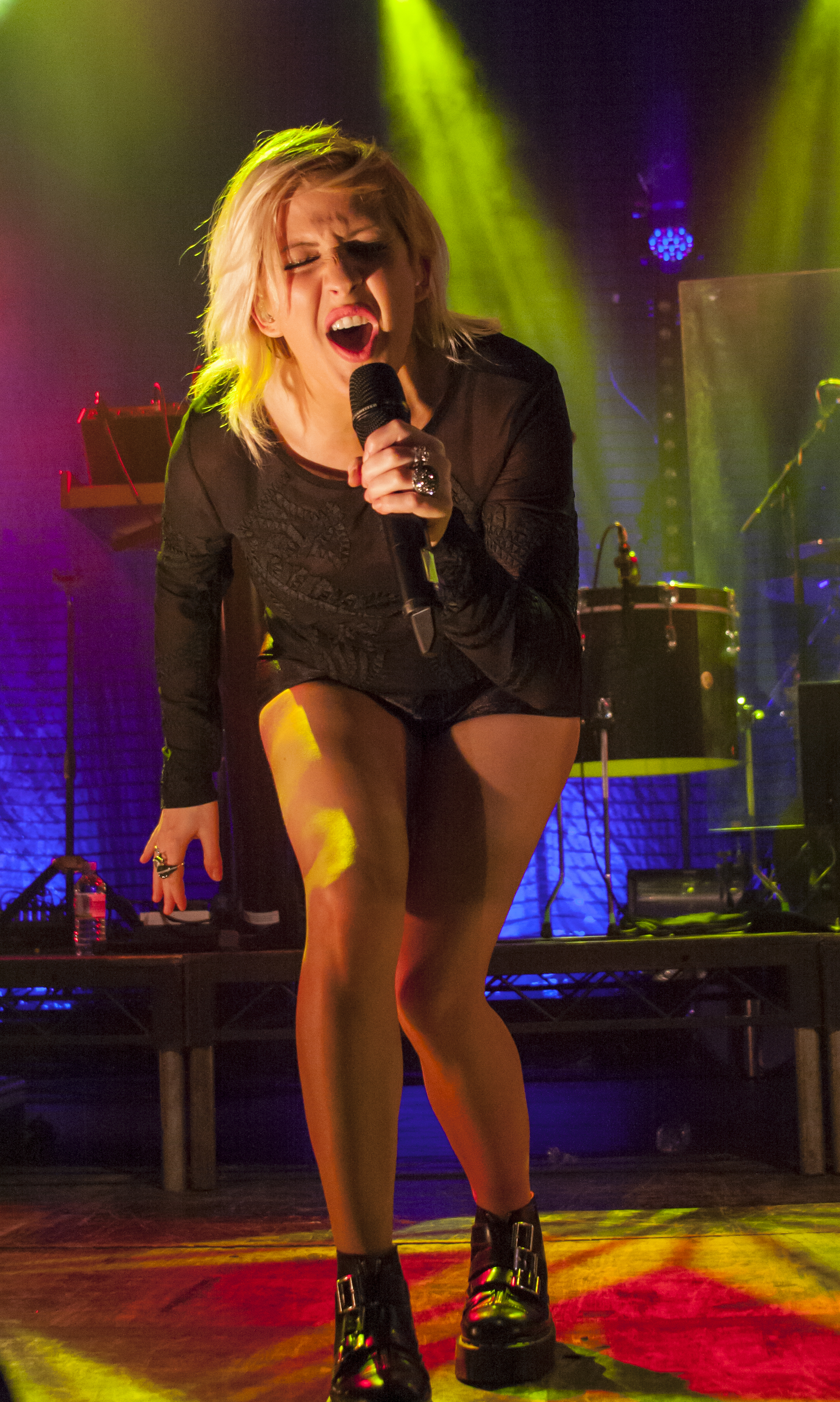
Ellie Goulding received triple platinum for her studio album Halcyon (2012).

Album	Artist(s)	Certification	Released	Certified	Units	Ref.
Best Of	Mirabela Dauer	Gold	1995	1995	—N/a	
Party in Transylvania	Marius Dragomir and Nadia Dragomir	Gold	1996	1996	—N/a	
Tomilio	Loredana Groza	Gold	1996	1997	—N/a	
Atât de singur	Talisman	Platinum	1997	1998	150,000	
Natalia Oreiro	Natalia Oreiro	Gold	1998	1999	—N/a	
Cântece de bivuac	Pasărea Colibri	Gold	1999	2002	35,000	
Dă muzica mai tare!	Hi-Q	Gold	2001	2002	35,000	
O noapte și-o zi	Andrè	Gold	2001	2002	50,000	
La întâlnire	Andrè	Platinum	1999	2002	100,000	
Noapte de vis	Andrè	Platinum	1999	2002	100,000	
Prima iubire	Andrè	Platinum	2001	2002	100,000	
Am să-mi fac de cap	Andrè	Platinum	2001	2002	100,000	
Încă 2000 de ani [ro]	Pasărea Colibri	Gold	2002	2002	35,000	
Jurăminte și suspine	Costi Ioniță	Gold	2002	2002	—N/a	
DiscO-Zone	O-Zone	Gold	2003	2003	—N/a	
Oare știi	Simplu	Gold	2002	2003	35,000	
Roata vieții	Benone Sinulescu	Gold	2002	2003	—N/a	
Inseparabili	Anna Lesko	Gold	2003	2004	35,000	
Spiritus Sanctus	Cargo	Double gold	2003	2004	—N/a	
Prețul succesului	Carmen Șerban	Platinum	2004	2004	100,000	
Bordeiaș	Viorica și Ioniță de la Clejani	Gold	2003	2005	35,000	
Ciorbă de curcan	Ileana Ciuculete	Gold	2005	2005	40,000	
Condoleanțe	Ombladon	Gold	2004	2005	—N/a	
Episodu' unu: Amenințarea faitonului	Fără Zahăr	Gold	2003	2005	35,000	
Reverse	Morandi	Gold	2005	2005	35,000	
Sindromul Tourette	Cheloo	Gold	2003	2005	—N/a	
S.O.S.	Akcent	Gold	2005	2005	35,000	
Superstar	Activ	Gold	2005	2005	35,000	
Zori de zi	Ștefan Bănică Jr.	Gold	2003	2005	—N/a	
Șoapte	DJ Project	Gold	2005	2005	30,000	
De dragoste... în toate felurile	Ștefan Bănică Jr.	Platinum	2001	2005	100,000	
Inimă nebună	Pepe	Platinum	2004	2005	100,000	
În culori	Akcent	Platinum	2005	2005	150,000	
M-ai găsit și ai... noroc!	Carmen Șerban	Platinum	2005	2005	100,000	
Primii 10 ani	Paraziții	Platinum	2004	2005	100,000	
Trup de vânt	Aurel Tămaș	Platinum	1999	2005	100,000	
Pur și simplu	Holograf	Double platinum	2003	2005	200,000	
De crăciun	Mihai Trăistariu	Gold	2006	2006	—N/a	
Jamparalele	Loredana Groza	Gold	2006	2006	—N/a	
Mă întreabă fiul meu	Steliana Sima	Gold	2005	2006	30,000	
Soarele meu	Mandinga	Gold	2005	2006	15,000	
Taina	Holograf	Gold	2006	2006	10,000	
Laundry Service Fijación Oral, Vol. 1 Oral Fixation, Vol. 2 (Note: The sales of Laundry Service, Fijación Oral, Vol. 1 and Oral Fixation, Vol. 2 were added together to provide the required number of units sold for a platinum certification.)	Shakira	Platinum	2001-2005	2006	—N/a	
La vârsta de trei ani	Cleopatra Stratan	Triple diamond	2006	2006	150,000	
Ambiental	Direcția 5	Gold	2006	2007	10,000	
Lumea mea	Angela Similea	Gold	2005	2007	—N/a	
B'Day	Beyoncé	Gold	2006	2007	—N/a	
Nuestro Amor	RBD	Gold	2005	2007	10,000	
Schrei	Tokio Hotel	Gold	2005	2007	2,000	
O mare familie	La Familia	Gold	2006	2007	10,000	
Confidențial	Anda Adam	Platinum	2005	2007	20,000	
Povestea mea	DJ Project	Platinum	2006	2007	25,000	
XII	Cargo	Gold	2007	2008	10,000	
Iubi	Florin Chilian	Gold	2001	2008	10,000	
La Vida... Es Un Ratico	Juanes	Gold	2007	2008	—N/a	
Mi Sangre	Juanes	Platinum	2004	2008	—N/a	
Loose	Nelly Furtado	Triple platinum	2006	2008	—N/a	
De la frate la soră	Andra and Săndel Mihai	Diamond	2007	2008	60,000	
N3XT	Morandi	Platinum	2007	2008	—N/a	
Cântecul și dragostea	Maria Dragomiroiu	Gold	2007	2009	—N/a	
Hello	Crush and Alexandra	Gold	2007	2009	—N/a	
Dragostea rămâne	Andra	Gold	2008	2009	—N/a	
În lipsa mea	Smiley	Gold	2008	2009	10,000	
Primăvara începe cu tine	Holograf	Gold	2009	2009	—N/a	
Spre fericire Îmi caut iubirea Etno (Note: The sales of Spre fericire, Îmi caut iubirea and Etno were added together to provide the required number of units sold for a gold certification.)	Bambi	Gold	2006–2010	2009	100,000	
No Line on the Horizon	U2	Platinum	2009	2009	—N/a	
One World One Love	Michael Bolton	Gold	2009	2010	—N/a	
Sărbători în Bucovina	Marius Zgâianu	Gold	2008	2010	12,000	
Cei ce vor fi	Iris	Platinum	2007	2010	100,000	
Liebe ist für alle da	Rammstein	Quadruple platinum	2009	2010	—N/a	
Hot	Inna	Gold	2009	2011	10,000	
Love Affair	Holograf	Gold	2012	2012	10,000	
Viața omului e o roată	Nemuritorii	Gold	2011	2012	10,000	
LaLa Love Songs	LaLa Band	Gold	2012	2012	10,000	
Na Balada	Michel Teló	Platinum	2011	2012	—N/a	
O, ce veste minunată!	Angela Gheorghiu	Gold	2013	2013	12,000	
O lacrimă de cântec	Fuego	Gold	2013	2013	—N/a	
Inevitabil va fi bine	Andra	Platinum	2013	2013	10,000	
Skeo	Keo and Skizzo Skillz	Platinum	2012	2013	13,540	
La Familia	J Balvin	Platinum	2013	2014	—N/a	
Autistul – Nu-l mai goniţi pe Brâncuşi!	Florin Chilian	Platinum	2010	2015	—N/a	
Let the Road	Rixton	Gold	2015	2016	—N/a	
Untold 2015	Various	Gold	2015	2016	—N/a	
Untold 2016	Various	Platinum	2016	2016	—N/a	
Life Line	Holograf	Double platinum	2015	2016	—N/a	
Gypsy Rock: Change or Die	Damian & Brothers	Gold	2016	2017	2,000	
Istanbul	Jordi Savall	Gold	2009	2017	—N/a	
Fata din povești	Adrian Sărmășan	Gold	2016	2017	—N/a	
Halcyon	Ellie Goulding	Triple platinum	2012	2017	—N/a	
Crăciunul nostru-i românesc	Fuego	Gold	2015	2018	—N/a	
Hardwired... to Self-Destruct	Metallica	Quadruple platinum	2016	2019	100,000	
World I See	Laura Bretan	Gold	2021	2021	—N/a	
Animal X	Animal X	Diamond	1999	—N/a	—N/a	
Level 2	Animal X	Diamond	2001	—N/a	—N/a	
Virtual	Animal X	Diamond	2001	—N/a	—N/a	
Dragostea mea	Andra	Gold	2002	—N/a	—N/a	
Revolution	Animal X	Diamond	2002	—N/a	—N/a	
Vreau sărutarea ta	Andra	Gold	2003	—N/a	—N/a	
FunRaptor	Animal X	Diamond	2004	—N/a	—N/a	
La prima vedere	Iris	Gold	2004	—N/a	—N/a	
Mama și fiul	Fuego and Irina Loghin	Gold	2004	—N/a	—N/a	
Derbedei	Animal X	Diamond	2006	—N/a	—N/a	
Ispita	Anna Lesko	Gold	2006	—N/a	35,000	
Yamasha	Alex Velea	Gold	2006	—N/a	—N/a	
Best Of	Animal X	Gold	2007	—N/a	—N/a	
Love, Lust, Faith and Dreams	Thirty Seconds to Mars	Gold	2013	—N/a	—N/a	
Ce-avem noi aici?!	CRBL	Gold	2014	—N/a	10,000	
Talisman	Talisman	Platinum	1997	—N/a	—N/a	
De ziua ta	Talisman	Platinum	2000	—N/a	—N/a	
Frumoasa mea	Marcel Pavel	Platinum	2000	—N/a	250,000	
Best of Nicola	Nicola	Platinum	2003	—N/a	—N/a	
În noaptea de crăciun	Fuego	Platinum	2006	—N/a	—N/a	
Valurile vieții	Fuego and Irina Loghin	Platinum	2006	—N/a	—N/a	

== See also ==
- List of music recording certifications
