= MTV Romania Music Awards 2007 =

2007 MTV Romania Music Awards
- Date: 10 May 2007
- Location: Sibiu, Piata Mare
- Website: mtv.ro/rma2007

Television/radio coverage
- Network: MTV Romania

The sixth annual MTV Romania Music Awards (Romanian: Premiile muzicale MTV România) were held on May 10, 2007 in Sibiu at the Piata Mare and included guest Sean Paul.

== Nominees and winners ==
=== Best Group ===
- 3Sud Est - Iubire
- Akcent - French Kiss
- DJ Project - Inca o noapte
- Hi-Q - Razna
- Simplu - Oficial imi merge bine WINNER

=== Best Song ===
- 3Sud Est - Iubire
- Andreea Bănică - Rendez-vous
- Cleopatra Stratan - Ghita WINNER
- DJ Project - Esti tot ce am
- Stefan Banica JR ft Stefan Banica SR - Cum am ajuns sa te iubesc

=== Best Female ===
- Anda Adam - Nai Nai
- Andreea Bănică - Rendez-vous
- Anna Lesko - 24
- Corina ft Toni Cottura - Quieres una aventura
- Loredana - Departare- WINNER

=== Best Male ===
- Alex - Yamasha
- Cheloo - Operatiunea c*r pansat
- Florin Chilian - Zece
- Pavel Stratan - Nunta
- Stefan Banica JR - Toata lumea danseaza - WINNER

=== Best Hip-Hop ===
- Bitza - Armele pregatite
- BUG Mafia ft Alexandra Vlad - Viata Noastra
- Cheloo - Operatiunea c*r pansat - WINNER
- Sisu si Puya ft Alex - Mai vrei
- Spike ft Cheloo - Bizar

=== Best New Artist ===
- Adrian Eftimie - No side effect
- Alex - Yamasha
- Andi ft Aida - For the First Time
- Cleopatra Stratan - Ghita - WINNER
- Spike ft Cheloo - Bizar

=== Best Dance ===
- 3Sud Est - Iubire
- Activ - Reasons
- Akcent - French Kiss
- DJ Project - Esti tot ce am - WINNER

=== Best Album ===
- Activ - Everyday WINNER
- Andreea Bănică - Rendez-vous
- Cleopatra Stratan - La varsta de 3 ani
- DJ Project - Povestea mea
- Voltaj - Revelator

=== Best Rock ===
- Cross - Un minut
- Iris - Vino pentru totdeauna - WINNER
- Keo - Dac-as putea sa zbor
- Voltaj - Stiu
- Zdob si Zdub - Miorita

=== Best Live Act ===
- Directia 5
- Loredana
- Mandinga
- Stefan Banica JR - WINNER
- Voltaj

=== Best Pop ===
- Andra - Ramai cu mine
- Andreea Bănică - Rendez-vous
- Directia 5 - Stai!Nu ma ocoli
- Florin Chilian - ZeceWINNER
- Holograf - Esti asa frumoasa

=== Best Video ===
- Andreea Bănică - Rendez-vous
- Corina - Overdrive
- Directia 5 - Stai!Nu ma ocoli
- Florin Chilian - Zece
- Simplu - Oficial imi merge bine WINNER

=== Best Website ===
- www.20cmrecords.com
- www.dj-project.ro
- www.trupaheaven.ro - WINNER
- www.proconsul.com.ro
- www.activmusic.ro

=== Best Alternative ===
- Animal X ft Corina - Ca la inceput
- Cassaloco - Tu si cu prietena ta
- OCS - Iaurt
- Suie Paparude - Armada verbala - WINNER
- Tmpuri Noi - Umbrela

=== Best International Artist ===
- Sean Paul
