= MTV Romania Music Awards =

Annual Romanian music awards

- Current: MTV Romania Music Awards 2007
- Awarded for: Best in music
- Country: Romania
- Presented by: MTV Romania
- First award: 2002
- Final award: 2007

The MTV Romania Music Awards (Romanian: Premiile Muzicale MTV România) have been held since 2002 celebrating Romanian music. Recipients of the awards have been Eurovision contestants and some have gone on to represent Romania in the competition. The awards were usually held in June. Since 2008 the show was cancelled. Starting then, it was replaced by the Romanian Music Awards, organized by Music Channel Romania.

== Locations ==
- July, 2002 - Palatul Copiilor, Bucharest
- June 5, 2003 – Sala Polivalentă, Bucharest
- June 3, 2004 – Sala Palatului, Bucharest
- April 23, 2005 – Sala Palatului, Bucharest
- June 3, 2006 – Sala Sporturilor Horia Demian, Cluj-Napoca
- May 10, 2007 – Piaţa Mare, Sibiu

== Winners ==
=== 2002 ===
- Best Photography, video of the year: Zdob si Zdub
- Best Pop Video: Directia 5 - Tot ce vrei. Director: Lucian Blaga
- Best Rock Video: Iris, Da, da, eu stiu. Director: Tudor Gramescu
- Best Dance Video: Class, Intr-o zi. Director: Class
- Best R&B: Cristina Spatar, Mesaj de dragoste
- Best female artist in a video: Paula Seling
- Best male artist in a video: Pepe
- Best choreography: Simplu
- Best debut: Cristiana Raduta
- Best Editing: Vama Veche
- Best Special Effects: Mamelino & O-zone
- Best Direction and Video of a band: Partizan - Fata mea. Director: Andreea Paduraru

=== 2003 ===
- Best Rock: Iris//Uriah Heep
- Best DJ: Rhadoo
- Best Group: Class
- Best Male: Marius Moga
- Best Female: Andra
- Best Live: Voltaj
- Best website: www.annes.ro
- Best New Act: Unu VS. George Nicolescu
- Best Song: O-Zone
- Best Dance: O-Zone
- Best Hip-Hop: Paraziţii
- Best Pop: Class
- Best Album: Animal X
- Best Video: Zdob şi Zdub
- Life Time Award: Phoenix
- Free Your Mind: "Litoralul pentru toţi" – Dan Matei Agathon

=== 2004 ===
- Best Female: Loredana - Femeia ta
- Best Male: Ştefan Bănică, Jr. - Am s-o aştept
- Best Pop: Class - Luna mi-a zâmbit
- Best Album: BUG Mafia - Băieţi buni
- Best Etno: Zdob şi Zdub - Everybody in the casa mare
- Best Song: 3rei Sud Est - Clipe
- Best Hip-Hop: B.U.G. Mafia - Româneşte
- Best Group: Voltaj - Noapte bună
- Best Dance: O-Zone - Dragostea din tei
- Best Rock: Cargo - Daca ploaia s-ar opri
- Best Video: Andra feat. Tiger One - Vreau sărutarea ta
- Best New Act: Spicy - Bikini party
- Best Live: Viţa de vie
- Best Website: www.gia.ro
- Free Your Mind: Paşi spre toleranţă (McCann Erickson)
- Life Time Achievement Award: Gică Petrescu

=== 2005 ===
- Best Hip-Hop: Ombladon ft. Raku - Egali Din Naştere
- Best New Act: Pavel Stratan - Eu Beu
- Best Female: Nicola - Îţi Mulţumesc
- Best Male: Pepe - Numai Iubirea
- Best Song: Activ - Doar Cu Tine
- Best Album: Parazitii - Primii 10 Ani
- Best Live Act: Viţa de vie - ClubJ, MTV Live
- Best Website: www.andreeab.ro
- Best Dance: Morandi - Love Me
- Best Etno: Etnic & Haiducii - Zorilor
- Best Pop: Directia 5 - Eşti Îngerul Meu
- Best Group: Voltaj - Şi Ce?
- Best Rock: Cargo - Nu Pot Trăi Fără Tine
- Best Video: Sensor - Help Yourself
- Lifetime Award: Teo Peter (Awarded posthumously)

=== 2006 ===
- Best Group: Akcent (Dragoste de închiriat)
- Best Song: Morandi (Beijo (Uh la la))
- Best Female: Loredana (Le le)
- Best Male: Ştefan Bănică, Jr. (Numele tău)
- Best Hip-Hop: Paraziţii (Violent)
- Best New Act: Heaven (Pentru totdeauna)
- Best Dance: DJ Project (Şoapte)
- Best Album: Pavel Stratan (Amintiri din copilărie)
- Best Rock: Iris (Maxima)
- Best Pop: Voltaj (Povestea oricui)
- Best Live Performance: Proconsul (Iaşi 2005, MTV Live)
- Best Video: Morandi (Falling asleep)
- Free Your Mind Award: Soknan Han Jung

=== 2007 ===
- Best Group: Simplu - Oficial îmi merge bine
- Best Song: Cleopatra Stratan - Ghiţă
- Best Female: Andreea Bănică - Fiesta
- Best Male: Ştefan Bănică, Jr. - Toata lumea dansează
- Best Hip-Hop: Cheloo - Operaţiunea c*r pansat
- Best New Artist: Cleopatra Stratan - Ghiţă
- Best Dance: DJ Project - Eşti tot ce am
- Best Album: Activ - Everyday
- Best Rock: Iris - Vino pentru totdeauna
- Best Live Act: Ştefan Bănică, Jr.
- Best Pop: Direcţia 5 - Stai! Nu mă ocoli
- Best Video: Simplu - Oficial îmi merge bine
- Best Website: www.trupaheaven.ro
- Best Alternative: Șuie Paparude - Armada verbală
- Best International Artist: Sean Paul

== See also ==
- MTV Romania
