= MTV Europe Music Award for Best Romanian Act =

Category of MTV Europe Music Awards

The following is a list of the MTV Europe Music Award winners and nominees for Best Romanian Act.

== 2000s ==
Year	Winner	Nominees
2002	Animal X	BUG Mafia; Class; Partizan; Zdob si Zdub
2003	AB4	Andra vs. Tiger One; O-Zone; Paraziții; Voltaj
2004	Ombladon (featuring Raku)	Activ; Cargo; Firma; O-Zone
2005	Voltaj	Akcent; DJ Project; Morandi; Parazitii
2006	DJ Project	Andreea Bănică as Blondy; Morandi; Parazitii; Simplu
2007 ^{[a]}	Andreea Bănică	Alex Velea; Activ; DJ Project; Simplu
2008 ^{[a]}	Morandi	Andra; Crazy Loop; Smiley; Tom Boxer with Anca Parghel and Fly Project
2009 ^{[a]}	INNA	David Deejay (featuring Dony); Puya (featuring George Hora); Smiley; Tom Boxer (featuring Jay)

== 2010s ==
Year	Winner	Nominees	Pre-nomination
2010	INNA	Connect-R; Dan Bălan; Deepcentral; Edward Maya and Vika Jigulina	
2011	Alexandra Stan	Fly Project; Guess Who; Puya; Smiley	
2012	Vunk	CRBL; Grassu XXL; Guess Who; Maximilian	
2013	Smiley	Antonia; Corina; Loredana Groza; What's Up and Andra	
2014	Andra	Smiley; Elena Gheorghe; Maxim; Antonia	Deepcentral; Shift; Vescan; What's Up
2015	INNA	Dan Bittman; Feli; Randi; Smiley	
2016	Andra	Feli; Manuel Riva; Smiley; Vanotek	

^{^[a]}Best Romanian & Moldovan Act

== See also ==
- MTV Romania Music Awards
