= Moldova Music Awards =

Moldovan music awards

- Country: Moldova
- Final award: 2019

Moldova Music Awards was an annual music awards ceremony in the Moldova that honored outstanding achievements in the Moldovan music industry. It recognized the most successful artists, music videos, songs, live performances, and industry contributors each year.

The awards were presented during a gala ceremony broadcast on television and featuring live performances.

== History ==
The ceremony originated as Șlagărul Anului, a popular Moldovan musical awards format. In 2019, organizers rebranded and expanded it into Moldova Music Awards to broaden its scope and provide more structured recognition of the country's music achievements.

== Format ==
The ceremony is a televised gala show that brings together prominent figures from the Moldovan music scene. Winners receive trophies known as the "Microfonul de aur" (transl. Golden Microphone) in various categories, which include best song, best live show, best video, artist of the year, and others. The ceremony also features performances by the country's top artists.

== Ceremonies and recipients ==
=== 2019 ===
The Moldova Music Awards 2019 gala took place on 19 November 2019 at the Nicolae Sulac Palatul Național in Chișinău. The ceremony featured numerous perofrmances, including Vali Boghean, Nicoleta Nucă, Mark Stam, Cleopatra Stratan, SunStroke Project, Dara, Natalia Gordienko, Akord, Ionel Istrati, DoReDoS, Olia Tira, 7 Klase, Maxim Zavidia, and others.

The winners at the Moldova Music Awards 2019:

- Excellence Award: Vali Boghean
- New Entry (Debutul Anului): Andrei Tostogan
- Industry Contribution (Producătorul Anului): Yury Rybak (for choreography)
- Best Live Show (Cel mai Bun Concert): Akord
- Best Video (Cel mai Bun Video): "Vina mea" by Mark Stam
- Best Project (Cea mai Bună Trupă): 7 Klase
- Best Male Artist (Artistul Anului): Mark Stam
- Best Female Artist (Artista Anului): Nicoleta Nucă
- Best Song (Cea mai Bună Piesă): "Vina mea" by Mark Stam
- Audience Award (Simpatia Publicului): Cleopatra Stratan, Ionel Istrati
- Hit FM Award: Nicoleta Nucă
- Europa Plus Award: Maxim Zavidia
- Zum FM Award: Cleopatra Stratan
- Muz FM Award: Dara

== See also ==
- Music of Moldova
- List of music awards
