= Vocea României season 1 =

Vocea României
- Season 1
- Hosted by: Pavel Bartoș
- Coaches: Horia Brenciu; Loredana Groza; Smiley; Marius Moga
- Winner: Ștefan Stan
- Winning coach: Smiley
- Runner-up: Dragoș Chircu
- No. of episodes: 15

Release
- Original network: ProTV
- Original release: September 27 – December 26, 2011

Season chronology
- Next → Season 2

The first season of the Romanian reality talent show Vocea României premiered on September 27, 2011 on ProTV and was hosted by Pavel Bartoș and Roxana Ionescu, while Vlad Roșca was the social media correspondent. Horia Brenciu, Loredana Groza, Smiley and Marius Moga were the coaches for the first season. Each coach was allowed to mentor twelve contestants. The winner was Ștefan Stan from Team Smiley.

The season finale aired on December 26, 2011. It immediately proved to be a hit for ProTV and the network renewed the show for a second season. The series consists of three phases: a blind audition, a battle phase and live performance shows.

== Overview ==
The series consists of three phases: a blind audition (audiție pe nevăzute), a battle phase (confruntări) and live performance shows (spectacole live). Four coaches, all famous musicians, choose teams of contestants through a blind audition process. Each coach has the length of the auditioner's performance (about two minutes) to decide if they want that singer on their team; if two or more coaches want the same singer, then the singer gets to choose their coach.

Contestant auditions were held on June 26 and 27, 2011, at Hotel Crown Plaza Bucharest. Contestants were also allowed to submit online applications.

== Teams ==
Color key

- Winner
- Runner-up
- Third place
- Fourth place
- Eliminated in Live shows
- Eliminated in the Sing-off round
- Eliminated in the Battle rounds
- Withdrew

Coaches	Top 48 artists					
Horia Brenciu						
Horia Brenciu	Iuliana Pușchilă	Irina Tănase	Daniel Dragomir	Robert Patai	Cristina Vasiu	Claudiu Mirea
Horia Brenciu	Lucian Darie	Vlad Gliga	Lucia Dumitrescu	Beatrice Vlădan	Krisztina Koszorús	Vlad Stoia
Loredana Groza						
Loredana Groza	Dragoș Chircu	Iulian Canaf	Alexandra Crăescu	Oana Brutaru	Aminda	Alexandra Penciu
Loredana Groza	Daniel Lazăr	Ana-Maria Flutur	Andra Covaleov	Alina Toma	Andrei Ion	Ana Odagiu
Smiley						
Smiley	Ștefan Stan	Cătălin Dobre	Anthony Icuagu	Marcel Lovin	Mihai Popistașu	Maximilian Muntean
Smiley	Brigitta Szebenyi	Gabriel Tran	Marian Vasilescu	Florina Nițulescu	Ionel Istrati	Lavinia Vâlcan
Marius Moga						
Marius Moga	Cristian Sanda	Liviu Teodorescu	Oana Radu	Aldo Blaga	Sebastian Muntean	Loredana Căvășdan
Marius Moga	Georgiana Mototolea	Teodora Moroșanu	Andreea Crepcia	Andrei Ciobanu	Irina Gorga	Aura Pohoață

== Blind auditions ==
Color key

✔	Coach hit his/her "I WANT YOU" button
	Artist defaulted to this coach's team
	Artist elected to join this coach's team
	Artist eliminated with no coach pressing his or her "I WANT YOU" button

=== Episode 1 (September 27) ===
The first of five pre-recorded audition episodes aired on Tuesday, September 27, 2011. The show started with the four coaches singing Queen's "Don't Stop Me Now".

Order	Artist	Age	Hometown	Song	Coach's and contestant's choices			
Order	Artist	Age	Hometown	Song	Brenciu	Loredana	Smiley	Moga
1	Ștefan Stan	34	Bucharest	"Bensonhurst Blues"	✔	✔	✔	—
2	Aminda	28	Cluj-Napoca, Cluj	"Forget You"	—	✔	—	—
3	Gabriela Tănase	23	Bucharest	"Promise Me"	—	—	—	—
4	Vlad Gliga	22	Cluj-Napoca, Cluj	"Delilah"	✔	—	—	—
5	Brigitta Szebenyi	25	Arad, Arad	"Ironic"	✔	✔	✔	✔
6	Mirela Apostu	30	Bucharest	"Don't Speak"	—	—	—	—
7	Aldo Blaga	25	Satu Mare, Satu Mare	"If Tomorrow Never Comes"	✔	✔	—	✔
8	Dana Torop	25	Craiova, Dolj	"The Best"	—	—	—	—
9	Liviu Teodorescu	19	Bucharest	"I Believe I Can Fly"	✔	✔	✔	✔
10	Teodora Mărgineanu	24	Suceava, Suceava	"Stand by Me"	—	—	—	—
11	Andra Covaleov	31	Bucharest	"Hallelujah I Love Her So"	—	✔	—	—
12	Claudiu Mirea	30	Craiova, Dolj	"Wild World"	✔	—	—	—
13	Loredana Căvășdan	21	Oradea, Bihor	"Are You Gonna Be My Girl"	✔	✔	✔	✔
14	Adrian Filip	31	Bucharest	"Unchain My Heart"	—	—	—	—
15	Dragoș Chircu	29	Bucharest	"Summertime"	✔	✔	✔	✔

=== Episode 2 (October 4) ===
The second episode aired on October 4, 2011.

Order	Artist	Age	Hometown	Song	Coach's and contestant's choices			
Order	Artist	Age	Hometown	Song	Brenciu	Loredana	Smiley	Moga
1	Cătălin Dobre	20	Brașov, Brașov	"I Feel Good"	—	—	✔	—
2	Beatrice Vlădan	21	Brașov, Brașov	"I'm Outta Love"	✔	—	✔	✔
3	Vlad Stoia	29	Bucharest	"Hello"	✔	✔	✔	✔
4	Vladimir Catană	25	Bucharest	"Memory"	—	—	—	—
5	Ana Odagiu	25	Bucharest	"Never Forget You"	—	✔	—	—
6	Bogdan Gheorghe	20	Bucharest	"Cerul"	—	—	—	—
7	Iuliana Pușchilă	16	Mangalia, Constanța	"Bleeding Love"	✔	✔	✔	—
8	Ionel Istrati	20	Chișinău, Moldova	"Bulería"	—	—	✔	✔
9	Teodora Moroșanu	25	Bucharest	"Perfect"	—	—	—	✔
10	Veronica Junger	40	Bucharest	"Walking in Memphis"	—	—	—	—
11	Mihăiță Bordeianu	25	Broșteni, Suceava	"Dacă ploaia s-ar opri"	—	—	—	—
12	Georgiana Mototolea	31	Bucharest	"Oh! Darling"	✔	—	—	✔
13	Cristina Vasiu	19	Hunedoara, Hunedoara	"Price Tag"	✔	—	—	—
14	Vlad Erdei	21	Timișoara, Timiș	"Maria Maria"	—	—	—	—
15	Marian Vasilescu	20	Drobeta-Turnu Severin, Mehedinți	"The Scientist"	—	—	✔	—

=== Episode 3 (October 11) ===
The third episode aired on October 11, 2011.

Order	Artist	Age	Hometown	Song	Coach's and contestant's choices			
Order	Artist	Age	Hometown	Song	Brenciu	Loredana	Smiley	Moga
1	Paula Ghivirigă	24	Fălticeni, Suceava	"No One"	—	—	—	—
2	Andrei Ciobanu	20	Bacău, Bacău	"Home"	—	✔	✔	✔
3	Irina Gorga	21	Măcin, Tulcea	"Fly Me to the Moon"	—	—	—	✔
4	Daniel Dragomir	24	Bucharest	"It's Not Unusual"	✔	✔	—	—
5	Vasile Seserman	24	Suceava, Suceava	"Hotel California"	—	—	—	—
6	Nicolae Stoican	24	Popești-Leordeni, Ilfov	"Superstition"	—	—	—	—
7	Lucian Darie	38	Piatra Neamț, Neamț	"Unforgettable"	✔	✔	✔	✔
8	Oana Brutaru	22	Roșiorii de Vede, Teleorman	"Proud Mary"	✔	✔	—	—
9	Andrei Ion	26	Bucharest	"Shape of My Heart"	—	✔	—	—
10	George Dogaru	21	Constanța, Constanța	"Dacă ai ști"	—	—	—	—
11	Irina Tănase	24	Bacău, Bacău	"Summertime"	✔	—	✔	—
12	Horia Cristea	42	Bucharest	"Blue Suede Shoes"	—	—	—	—
13	Alexandra Crăescu	23	Moinești, Bacău	"The Show Must Go On"	✔	✔	—	—
14	Cristina Croitoru	23	Chișinău, Moldova	"I Will Love Again"	—	—	—	—
15	Florina Nițulescu	18	Târgu Jiu, Gorj	"Chain of Fools"	—	—	✔	—

=== Episode 4 (October 18) ===
The fourth episode aired on October 18, 2011.

Order	Artist	Age	Hometown	Song	Coach's and contestant's choices			
Order	Artist	Age	Hometown	Song	Brenciu	Loredana	Smiley	Moga
1	Anthony Icuagu	25	Bucharest	"Use Somebody"	—	✔	✔	✔
2	Oana Zamfir	24	Brașov, Brașov	"Rolling in the Deep"	—	—	—	—
3	Sebastian Muntean	22	Bucharest	"Kiss from a Rose"	—	✔	✔	✔
4	Maximilian Muntean	24	Bucharest	"Everything"	—	✔	✔	—
5	Cristian Baciu	37	Bucharest	"Blue Suede Shoes"	—	—	—	—
6	Alexandra Penciu	16	Galați, Galați	"Incomplete"	—	✔	—	—
7	Krisztina Koszorús	22	Târgu Mureș, Mureș	"Smooth Operator"	✔	—	✔	—
8	Iulian Canaf	38	Iași, Iași	"Knockin' on Heaven's Door"	—	✔	—	—
9	Oana Radu	17	Craiova, Dolj	"Turning Tables"	✔	✔	✔	✔
10	Alina Hordilă	24	Vaslui, Vaslui	"Nobody's Wife"	—	—	—	—
11	Gabriel Tran	24	Bumbești-Jiu, Gorj	"If Tomorrow Never Comes"	—	—	✔	—
12	Teodora Sima	17	Bucharest	"No One"	—	—	—	—
13	Andreea Crepcia	25	Bucharest	"When Love Takes Over"	✔	—	✔	✔
14	Levente Szász	25	Bucharest	"It's All Coming Back to Me Now"	—	—	—	—
15	Robert Patai	33	Bucharest	"Purple Rain"	✔	✔	—	✔

=== Episode 5 (October 25) ===
The fifth and last blind audition episode was aired on October 25, 2011.

Order	Artist	Age	Hometown	Song	Coach's and contestant's choices			
Order	Artist	Age	Hometown	Song	Brenciu	Loredana	Smiley	Moga
1	Veronica Anghel	26	Măgurele, Ilfov	"I Bruise Easily"	—	—	—	—
2	Marcel Lovin	25	Bacău, Bacău	"Me and Mrs. Jones"	✔	✔	✔	✔
3	Lavinia Simina Vâlcan	27	Timișoara, Timiș	"Pas în doi"	—	—	✔	—
4	Daniel Lazăr	33	Bucharest	"Let Me Entertain You"	—	✔	—	—
5	Mihai Popistașu	22	Iași, Iași	"Incomplete"	✔	✔	✔	✔
6	Mirela Boțocan	29	Sibiu, Sibiu	"What's Up?"	—	—	—	—
7	Mihai Grigoraș	26	Bacău, Bacău	"Freedom! '90"	—	—	—	—
8	Lucia Dumitrescu	21	Bucharest	"Ain't No Other Man"	✔	—	—	—
9	Ana-Maria Fluturu	24	Galați, Galați	"Baby Love"	—	✔	—	—
10	Andra Fănică	16	Tecuci, Galați	"I Don't Want to Miss a Thing"	—	—	—	—
11	Elena Sandu	29	Bucharest	"Mi-ai luat inima"	—	—	—	—
12	Cristian Sanda	18	Craiova, Dolj	"Sorry Seems to Be the Hardest Word"	✔	✔	✔	✔
13	Aura Pohoață	25	Bucharest	"Nobody's Wife"	—	✔	—	✔
14	Alexandru Neș	22	Constanța, Constanța	"Sway"	—	—	—	—
15	Alina Toma	24	Galați, Galați	"It's a Man's Man's Man's World"	—	✔	—	—

== The battles ==
After the blind auditions, each coach had twelve contestants for the battle rounds that aired from November 1 to November 15, 2011. Coaches began narrowing down the playing field by training the contestants with the help of "trusted advisors". Each episode featured seven or eight battles consisting of pairings from within each team, and each battle concluding with the respective coach eliminating one of the two contestants.

The trusted advisors for these episodes are: Monica Anghel working with Horia Brenciu, Dana Dorian working with Loredana Groza, Alex Velea working with Smiley and Randi working with Marius Moga

Color key

Artist won the battle and advanced to the next round
Artist lost the battle and was eliminated

=== Episode 6 (1 November) ===
The sixth episode aired on November 1, 2011.

Coach	Order	Winner	Song	Loser
Smiley	1	Cătălin Dobre	"Beat It"	Ionel Istrati
Marius Moga	2	Cristian Sanda	"Cry Me a River"	Aura Pohoață
Horia Brenciu	3	Claudiu Mirea	"Every Breath You Take"	Vlad Stoia
Loredana Groza	4	Aminda	"Valerie"	Ana Odagiu
Smiley	5	Ștefan Stan	"Give Me One Reason"	Florina Nițulescu
Horia Brenciu	6	Iuliana Pușchilă	"Tattoo"	Krisztina Koszorús
Marius Moga	7	Sebastian Muntean	"Broken Strings"	Irina Gorga

=== Episode 7 (8 November) ===
The seventh episode aired on November 8, 2011.

Coach	Order	Winner	Song	Loser
Marius Moga	1	Aldo Blaga	"I Want It That Way"	Andrei Ciobanu
Horia Brenciu	2	Daniel Dragomir	"It Takes Two"	Beatrice Vlădan
Marius Moga	3	Oana Radu	"Halo"	Andreea Crepcia
Smiley	4	Maximilian Muntean	"Hey Jude"	Marian Vasilescu
Marius Moga	5	Loredana Căvășdan	"So What"	Teodora Moroșanu
Loredana Groza	6	Iulian Canaf	"Sailing"	Andrei Ion
Smiley	7*	Anthony Icuagu	"So Sick"	Gabriel Tran
Smiley	7*	Marcel Lovin	"So Sick"	Gabriel Tran
Loredana Groza	8	Alexandra Penciu	"Why"	Alina Toma

=== Episode 8 (15 November) ===
The eighth episode aired on November 15, 2011.

Coach	Order	Winner	Song	Loser
Horia Brenciu	1	Cristina Vasiu	"Lady Marmalade"	Lucia Dumitrescu
Loredana Groza	2	Oana Brutaru	"Only Girl (In the World)"	Andra Covaleov
Marius Moga	3	Liviu Teodorescu	"You Are Not Alone"	Georgiana Mototolea
Horia Brenciu	4	Robert Patai	"All for Love"	Vlad Gliga
Loredana Groza	5	Alexandra Crăescu	"I Drove All Night"	Ana-Maria Fluturu
Smiley	6	Mihai Popistașu	"Need You Now"	Brigitta Szebenyi
Horia Brenciu	7	Irina Tănase	"Easy Lover"	Lucian Darie
Loredana Groza	8	Dragoș Chircu	"With or Without You"	Daniel Lazăr

* Lavinia Vâlcan withdrew from the contest (see #Controversies); as a result, Anthony Icuagu, Gabriel Tran and Marcel Lovin formed a trio for the battle rounds.

== The sing-off ==
At the end of the battle rounds, each coach advanced four contestants from their team to the live shows, leaving the other two to duel for the fifth and last spot, in an extra round called "the sing-off" (cântecul decisiv). The contestants sang their blind audition songs again and the coaches chose one contestant each.

Color key:

Artist won the Sing off and advanced to the Live shows
Artist lost the Sing off and was eliminated

Coach	Order	Artist	Song	Result
Marius Moga	1	Sebastian Muntean	"Kiss from a Rose"	Advanced
Marius Moga	2	Loredana Căvășdan	"Are You Gonna Be My Girl"	Eliminated
Loredana Groza	3	Oana Brutaru	"Proud Mary"	Advanced
Loredana Groza	4	Alexandra Penciu	"Incomplete"	Eliminated
Horia Brenciu	5	Claudiu Mirea	"Wild World"	Eliminated
Horia Brenciu	6	Daniel Dragomir	"It's Not Unusual"	Advanced
Smiley	7	Mihai Popistașu	"Incomplete"	Advanced
Smiley	8	Maximilian Muntean	"Everything"	Eliminated

== Live shows ==
Color key

Artist was saved by the public vote
Artist was chosen by their coach
Artist went to the sing-off
Artist was eliminated

=== Week 1 (November 22) ===
Team Brenciu and Team Smiley competed in the first live show, which aired on November 22. From each team, viewers could save two contestants, while the coach could save one of the remaining three. The other two went on to the sing-off (cântecul decisiv), where they performed their songs for the night once again, after which one was eliminated by their coach.

Episode 9 (November 22)
Coach	Order	Artist	Song	Result	
Horia Brenciu	1	Robert Patai	"Crazy"	Sing-off	Brenciu's choice
Smiley	2	Marcel Lovin	"If You Don't Know Me by Now"	Smiley's choice	
Horia Brenciu	3	Cristina Vasiu	"Single Ladies (Put a Ring on It)"	Sing-off	Eliminated
Smiley	4	Cătălin Dobre	"Breathe Easy"	Public's vote	
Horia Brenciu	5	Iuliana Pușchilă	"Walking on Sunshine"	Public's vote	
Smiley	6	Mihai Popistașu	"Grenade"	Sing-off	Eliminated
Horia Brenciu	7	Irina Tănase	"At Last"	Public's vote	
Smiley	8	Anthony Icuagu	"Down"	Sing-off	Smiley's choice
Horia Brenciu	9	Daniel Dragomir	"Two Princes"	Brenciu's choice	
Smiley	10	Ștefan Stan	"Still Got the Blues (For You)"	Public's vote	

Non-competition performances
Order	Performer	Song
1	Horia Brenciu, Loredana Groza, Smiley and Marius Moga	"Mamma Mia"
2	Rea Garvey	"Tonight"
3	Rea Garvey	"Can't Stand the Silence"

=== Week 2 (November 29) ===
Team Loredana and Team Moga competed in the second live show, which aired on November 29. Public voting (by phone calls and text messages) commenced at this point. From each team, viewers could save two contestants, while the coach could save one of the remaining three. The other two went on to the sing-off (cântecul decisiv), where they performed their songs for the night once again, after which one was eliminated by their coach.

Episode 10 (November 29)
Coach	Order	Artist	Song	Result	
Loredana Groza	1	Aminda	"The Edge of Glory"	Sing-off	Eliminated
Marius Moga	2	Sebastian Muntean	"Just the Way You Are"	Sing-off	Eliminated
Loredana Groza	3	Oana Brutaru	"I'm Like a Bird"	Sing-off	Loredana's choice
Marius Moga	4	Aldo Blaga	"I'm Yours"	Sing-off	Moga's choice
Loredana Groza	5	Iulian Canaf	"Blue Moon"	Public's vote	
Marius Moga	6	Cristian Sanda	"Hero"	Moga's choice	
Loredana Groza	7	Alexandra Crăescu	"Livin' on a Prayer"	Loredana's choice	
Marius Moga	8	Oana Radu	"Someone like You"	Public's vote	
Loredana Groza	9	Dragoș Chircu	"Unchained Melody"	Public's vote	
Marius Moga	10	Liviu Teodorescu	"Always on My Mind"	Public's vote	

Non-competition performances
Order	Performer	Song
1	Ben Saunders	"Use Somebody"
2	Ben Saunders	"Dry Your Eyes"

=== Week 3 (6 & 9 December) ===
The third week comprised episodes 11 and 12. Team Brenciu and Team Smiley competed in the first part of this week, which aired on Tuesday, December 6, while Team Loredana and Team Moga competed in the second part of this week, which aired on Friday, December 9. Voting proceeded as before, except the public vote could only save one contestant from each team. Voting proceeded as before, except the public vote could only save one contestant from each team.

Episode 11 (December 6)
Coach	Order	Artist	Song	Result	
Smiley	1	Ștefan Stan	"Father Figure"	Public's vote	
Horia Brenciu	2	Irina Tănase	"De-ar fi să vii"	Sing-off	Brenciu's choice
Smiley	3	Cătălin Dobre	"I Want to Break Free"	Smiley's choice	
Horia Brenciu	4	Robert Patai	"I'll Make Love to You"	Sing-off	Eliminated
Smiley	5	Anthony Icuagu	"I Swear"	Sing-off	Smiley's choice
Horia Brenciu	6	Iuliana Pușchilă	"Stop!"	Public's vote	
Smiley	7	Marcel Lovin	"Caught Up"	Sing-off	Eliminated
Horia Brenciu	8	Daniel Dragomir	"She's the One"	Brenciu's choice	

Non-competition performances
Order	Performer	Song
1	Horia Brenciu and his team	"Blame It on the Boogie"
2	Valentin Dinu	"Wake Me Up Before You Go-Go"
3	Smiley and his team	"Celebration"
4	Loredana Groza and Marius Moga	"Especially for You"
5	Valentin Dinu	"Superstition"

Episode 12 (December 9)
Coach	Order	Artist	Song	Result	
Marius Moga	1	Liviu Teodorescu	"Right Here Waiting"	Moga's choice	
Loredana Groza	2	Oana Brutaru	"Time After Time"	Sing-off	Eliminated
Marius Moga	3	Aldo Blaga	"Așa frumoasă"	Sing-off	Eliminated
Loredana Groza	4	Dragoș Chircu	"Take On Me"	Loredana's choice	
Marius Moga	5	Oana Radu	"Listen"	Sing-off	Moga's choice
Loredana Groza	6	Iulian Canaf	"Sunny"	Public's vote	
Marius Moga	7	Cristian Sanda	"Say Something"	Public's vote	
Loredana Groza	8	Alexandra Crăescu	"Cry Me Out"	Sing-off	Loredana's choice

Non-competition performances
Order	Performer	Song
1	Team Loredana	"I Should Be So Lucky"
2	Kate Ryan	"Voyage Voyage"
3	Marius Moga and his team	"Bohemian Rhapsody"
4	Dan Teodorescu and Team Smiley	"Cele două cuvinte"
5	Steliyana Khristova	"I Love Rock 'n' Roll"
6	Loredana Groza and her team	"O fată singură în noapte"
7	Team Moga	"Heal the World"
8	Team Brenciu	"Stayin' Alive"
9	Kate Ryan and Narco	"Broken"

=== Week 4 (13 & 16 December) ===
The fourth week comprised episodes 13 and 14. All remaining contestants performed in both live shows. Voting proceeded as before, except the third-placed contestant in each team was automatically eliminated, without going through the sing-off round.

Episode 13 (December 13)
Coach	Order	Artist	Song	Result
Loredana Groza	1	Iulian Canaf	"I Got a Woman"	Loredana's choice
Marius Moga	2	Oana Radu	"I Will Survive"	Eliminated
Smiley	3	Anthony Icuagu	"Man in the Mirror"	Eliminated
Horia Brenciu	4	Irina Tănase	"If I Ain't Got You"	Brenciu's choice
Smiley	5	Cătălin Dobre	"Sex on Fire"	Smiley's choice
Marius Moga	6	Liviu Teodorescu	"Trouble"	Moga's choice
Loredana Groza	7	Alexandra Crăescu	"Hot Stuff"	Eliminated
Horia Brenciu	8	Iuliana Pușchilă	"Big Girls Don't Cry"	Public's vote
Marius Moga	9	Cristian Sanda	"Ain't No Sunshine"	Public's vote
Horia Brenciu	10	Daniel Dragomir	"Più bella cosa"	Eliminated
Smiley	11	Ștefan Stan	"(Everything I Do) I Do It for You"	Public's vote
Loredana Groza	12	Dragoș Chircu	"Careless Whisper"	Public's vote

Non-competition performances
Order	Performer	Song
1	Loredana Groza	"Lele"
2	Sunrise Avenue	"Fairytale Gone Bad"
3	Horia Brenciu and Loredana Groza	"Mi-e dor de tine"
4	Sunrise Avenue	"Hollywood Hills"

=== Semi-final (December 16) ===
All eight remaining contestants performed in the semi-final on Friday, December 16, 2011. Within each team, the coach and the viewers each had a 50/50 say; the contestant with the highest combined score went on to the final.

Episode 14 (December 16)
Coach	Artist	Order	First song	Order	Second song	Result
Marius Moga	Cristian Sanda	1	"Oameni"	9	"Nothing's Gonna Change My Love for You"	Public's vote
Smiley	Cătălin Dobre	2	"Bed of Roses"	10	"Cea mai tare piesă"	Eliminated
Loredana Groza	Iulian Canaf	3	"Vagabondul vieții mele"	11	"What a Wonderful World"	Eliminated
Horia Brenciu	Iuliana Pușchilă	4	"Listen to Your Heart"	12	"Spune-mi"	Public's vote
Marius Moga	Liviu Teodorescu	5	"În lipsa mea"	13	"Feel"	Eliminated
Smiley	Ștefan Stan	6	"Fever"	14	"Hai acasă"	Public's vote
Horia Brenciu	Irina Tănase	7	"Vreau să vii în viața mea"	16	"Respect"	Eliminated
Loredana Groza	Dragoș Chircu	8	"Vorbe care dor"	15	"You Raise Me Up"	Public's vote

Non-competition performances
Order	Performer	Song
1	The top 8 contestants	"Bună dimineața la Moș Ajun" "Domn, Domn, să-nălțăm" "Jingle Bells"
2	Mohombi	"Coconut Tree"
3	Loredana Groza	Medley: "Bună seara, iubito!" "Cine te crezi?" "Dar-ar naiba-n tine, dragoste" "Tomilio" "Mărioară de la Gorj" "Maria neichii, Mărie"
4	Smiley	"Piesa care nu se aude la radio"
5	Horia Brenciu	"Fac ce-mi spune inima"
6	Cătălin Josan	"Fragile"
7	Mohombi	"In Your Head" / "Bumpy Ride"

Results
Coach	Finalist		Coach/televote percentages	Eliminated	
Marius Moga	Cristian Sanda	104%	50% 50%	96%	Liviu Teodorescu
Marius Moga	Cristian Sanda	104%	54% 46%	96%	Liviu Teodorescu
Loredana Groza	Dragoș Chircu	115%	50% 50%	85%	Iulian Canaf
Loredana Groza	Dragoș Chircu	115%	65% 35%	85%	Iulian Canaf
Horia Brenciu	Iuliana Pușchilă	121%	60% 40%	79%	Irina Tănase
Horia Brenciu	Iuliana Pușchilă	121%	61% 39%	79%	Irina Tănase
Smiley	Ștefan Stan	118%	55% 45%	82%	Cătălin Dobre
Smiley	Ștefan Stan	118%	63% 37%	82%	Cătălin Dobre

=== Week 5: Final (December 26) ===
The top 4 contestants performed in the grand final on Monday, December 26, 2011. This week, the four finalists performed a solo song, a duet with a famous singer and a duet with their coach. The public vote determined the winner, and that resulted in a victory for Ștefan Stan, Smiley's first victory as a coach.

Episode 15 (December 26)
Coach	Artist	Order	Solo song	Order	Duet song (with famous singer)	Order	Duet song (with coach)	Result
Loredana Groza	Dragoș Chircu	1	"When a Man Loves a Woman"	11	"Abrázame" (with Pepe)	7	"Time To Say Goodbye"	Runner-up
Marius Moga	Cristian Sanda	6	"Feeling Good"	2	"Adagio" (with Felicia Filip)	9	"Tot mai sus"	Fourth place
Horia Brenciu	Iuliana Pușchilă	5	"The Winner Takes It All"	10	"20 de ani" (with Voltaj)	3	"(I've Had) The Time of My Life"	Third place
Smiley	Ștefan Stan	12	"My Way"	8	"Vivo per lei" (with Andra)	4	"(I Can't Get No) Satisfaction"	Winner

Non-competition performances
Order	Performer	Song
1	Daniel, Robert, Dragoș, Marcel, Alexandra, Sebastian, Cristina, Anthony, Iuliana, Cătălin, Aminda, Oana Brutaru, Oana Radu, Irina, Cristian and Liviu	"Joy to the World"
2	Cătălin Dobre and Cabron	"Spune-mi dacă vrei"
3	Andra and Alexandra Penciu	"Over the Rainbow"
4	Loredana Groza, Aminda, Alexandra Crăescu, Oana Brutaru and Alexandra Penciu	"Extravaganza"
5	Horia Brenciu, Daniel Dragomir, Vlad Gliga, Claudiu Mirea and Robert Patai	"I Want It That Way"
6	Liviu Teodorescu, LuKone and deMoga	"Electronic Symphony"
7	Horia Brenciu, Loredana Groza, Smiley and Marius Moga	"We Are the Champions"
8	Ștefan Stan	"My Way" (winning reprise)

Results
Place	Coach	Artist	Result
1	Smiley	Ștefan Stan	37.67%
2	Loredana Groza	Dragoș Chircu	23.01%
3	Horia Brenciu	Iuliana Pușchilă	20.69%
4	Marius Moga	Cristian Sanda	18.63%

== Elimination chart ==
Color key
Artist info

- Artist from Team Brenciu
- Artist from Team Loredana
- Artist from Team Smiley
- Artist from Team Moga

Weekly results per artist
Artist	Week 1	Week 2	Week 3	Week 4		Week 5
Artist	Week 1	Week 2	Week 3	Tuesday	Friday	Week 5
Ștefan Stan	Safe	—N/a	Safe	Safe	Safe	Winner
Dragoș Chircu	—N/a	Safe	Safe	Safe	Safe	Runner-up
Iuliana Pușchilă	Safe	—N/a	Safe	Safe	Safe	3rd place
Cristian Sanda	—N/a	Safe	Safe	Safe	Safe	4th place
Liviu Teodorescu	—N/a	Safe	Safe	Safe	Eliminated	Eliminated (Semi-final)
Iulian Canaf	—N/a	Safe	Safe	Safe	Eliminated	Eliminated (Semi-final)
Cătălin Dobre	Safe	—N/a	Safe	Safe	Eliminated	Eliminated (Semi-final)
Irina Tănase	Safe	—N/a	Sing-off	Safe	Eliminated	Eliminated (Semi-final)
Daniel Dragomir	Safe	—N/a	Safe	Eliminated	Eliminated (Week 4)	
Alexandra Crăescu	—N/a	Safe	Sing-off	Eliminated	Eliminated (Week 4)	
Anthony Icuagu	Sing-off	—N/a	Sing-off	Eliminated	Eliminated (Week 4)	
Oana Radu	—N/a	Safe	Sing-off	Eliminated	Eliminated (Week 4)	
Aldo Blaga	—N/a	Sing-off	Eliminated	Eliminated (Week 3)		
Oana Brutaru	—N/a	Sing-off	Eliminated	Eliminated (Week 3)		
Marcel Lovin	Safe	—N/a	Eliminated	Eliminated (Week 3)		
Robert Patai	Sing-off	—N/a	Eliminated	Eliminated (Week 3)		
Sebastian Muntean	—N/a	Eliminated	Eliminated (Week 2)			
Aminda	—N/a	Eliminated	Eliminated (Week 2)			
Mihai Popistașu	Eliminated	Eliminated (Week 1)				
Cristina Vasiu	Eliminated	Eliminated (Week 1)				

== Controversies ==
Lavinia Vâlcan, a contestant in Team Smiley, withdrew from the contest before the battle round, as she considered that the show didn't allow her to express herself as an artist. Vâlcan claimed that, for the battle round, she had been forced to choose between two songs that did not suit her. The artist stated that the producers were uninterested in receiving a third proposal from her.

== Ratings ==
Phase	#	Original airdate		Average (000)	Rating (%)
Blind auditions	1	September 27, 2011		1,007	8.7
Blind auditions	2	October 4, 2011		1,150	9.9
Blind auditions	3	October 11, 2011		1,189	10.2
Blind auditions	4	October 18, 2011		1,029	8.9
Blind auditions	5	October 25, 2011		1,049	9.0
Battles	6	November 1, 2011		1,096	9.4
Battles	7	November 8, 2011		964	8.3
Battles	8	November 15, 2011		969	8.3
Live shows	9	November 22, 2011	Part 1	816	7.0
Live shows	9	November 22, 2011	Part 2	489	4.2
Live shows	10	November 29, 2011		859	7.4
Live shows	11	December 6, 2011	Part 1	680	5.9
Live shows	11	December 6, 2011	Part 2	503	4.3
Live shows	12	December 9, 2011		667	5.7
Live shows	13	December 13, 2011	Part 1	722	6.2
Live shows	13	December 13, 2011	Part 2	506	4.4
Semi-final	14	December 16, 2011		689	5.9
Final	15	December 26, 2011		982	8.5

- Note: The figures above are approximations and they only represent viewers from urban areas.
