= Mark Stam =

Moldovan singer-songwriter (born 1997)

- Born: Marius Stamatin; 21 August 1997 (age 28); Chişinău, Moldova
- Genres: Pop
- Occupations: Singer; songwriter
- Instruments: Vocals; guitar; piano
- Years active: 2017–present
- Labels: Spoiala Brothers, Global Records

Mark Stam (born 21 August 1997 in Chişinău, Moldova) is a Moldovan singer-songwriter. He rose to prominence after his 2013 participation in Moldova are talent, when he teamed up with Spoiala Brothers, and would later sign a record deal with Global Records. In 2018, Stam achieved significant success in Romania with "Impar", peaking at number one on the country's national Airplay 100 ranking.

== Career ==
Stam was born Marius Stamatin on 21 August 1997 in Chişinău, Moldova. He showed special interest in music at an early age, and went on to teach himself to play guitar and piano by watching YouTube tutorials. In 2013, Stam took part in Moldova are talent in 2013. As part of the label Spoiala Brothers, the singer achieved notable success in his native Moldova with his early releases, but was introduced to the Romanian public by Alina Eremia, whom he collaborated with on "Doar noi" (2018). The single achieved significant radio and television airplay there. He soon after signed a record deal with Global Records. In 2018, Stam was nominated in the Best Male Artist category at the Elle Style Awards România, and also appeared on the Elle Man magazine cover for their November issue. He also posed for Cosmopolitan the same month. On 25 November 2018, his single "Impar" reached number one on Romania's national Airplay 100 chart.

== Personal life and musical style ==
Stam has residences in both Moldova and Romania. His releases approach a pop style, with heavy influences of rhythm and blues (R&B), soul and folk music. Stam cites Ed Sheeran and Bruno Mars as musical influencers.

== Singles ==
Title	Year	Album
"A murit iubirea"	2017	Non-album singles
"Days Are Coming"	2017	Non-album singles
"Doar noi"	2017	Non-album singles
"Doar noi" (with Alina Eremia)	2018	Non-album singles
"Impar"	2018	Non-album singles
"Vina mea"	2018	Non-album singles
"Nesimțit"	2019	Non-album singles
"Ultima oară"	2019	Non-album singles
"Ca să fii fericit" (with Ami)	2019	Non-album singles
"Waiting"	2019	Non-album singles
"Dependența mea"	2019	Non-album singles
"Privirea ta"	2020	Non-album singles

== Awards and nominations ==
Year	Award	Category	Nominee(s)	Result	Ref.
2018	Elle Style Awards România	Best Male Artist	Himself	Nominated	
2019	The Artist Awards	Best New Artist	Himself	Won	
2019	Moldova Music Awards	Best Video	"Vina mea"	Won	
2019	Moldova Music Awards	Best Male Artist	Himself	Won	
2019	Moldova Music Awards	Best Song	"Vina mea"	Won	
