= Cleopatra Stratan =

Moldovan-born Romanian singer (born 2002)

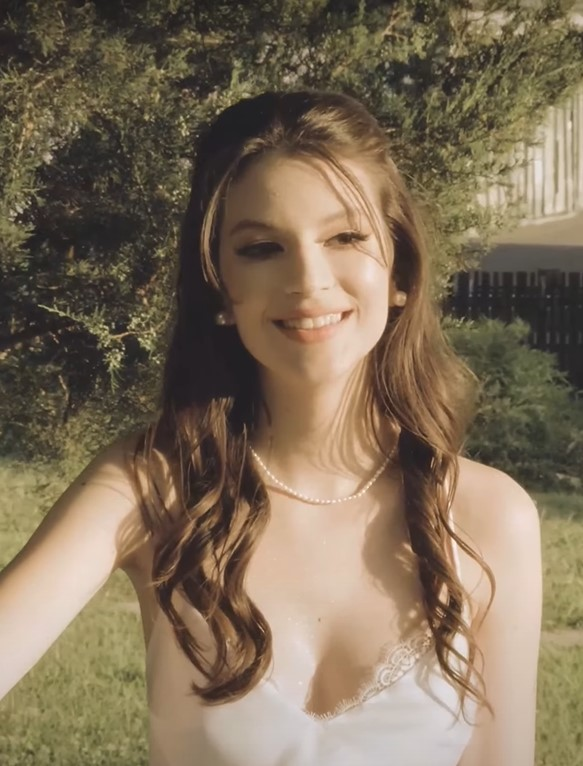
- Stratan in 2021

Background information
- Also known as: Cleo
- Born: October 6, 2002 (age 23); Chișinău, Moldova
- Genres: kids music, pop
- Occupations: Singer, model
- Instrument: Vocals
- Years active: 2006–present
- Label: Cat Music Romania

Cleopatra Stratan (born October 6, 2002) is a Moldovan singer, the youngest person ever to score commercial success, with her 2006 album La vârsta de trei ani ("At the age of 3"). She holds the record for the highest paid young artist, the youngest artist to receive an MTV award and the youngest artist to score a No.1 hit in a country ("Ghiță" on the Romanian Singles Chart). As of late 2011, Cleopatra and her family have relocated and are living in Pipera. On her 18th birthday, Cleopatra announced her engagement to 24 year old soloist, Edward Sanda.

== Early life ==
Pavel Stratan, father of Cleopatra, was in a studio recording a song with three-year-old Cleopatra hanging around. Impulsively, she grabbed a microphone and started singing along with Pavel. Everybody was stunned so they ended up recording the song with Cleopatra performing the lead vocals, and suggested that as she is younger than Shirley Temple, she should be included in the Guinness Book of World Records as the youngest talent ever to perform on stage and record her own album. Some of her songs have already been translated into English and Spanish. La vârsta de 3 ani and a Ghiță maxi-single were also released in Japan. La vârsta de trei ani ("At the age of 3") was a double platinum disk in the summer of 2006 for selling more than 150,000 albums in Romania. In December 2006, her father announced that until the next album is released, she would no longer sing publicly.

As of December 2006, Cleopatra's biggest hit is the song "Ghiță".

In 2008, Cleopatra released her second album called La vârsta de 5 ani with the hit song "Zunea-Zunea". On 13 December 2008, her brother, Cezar (named by Cleopatra) was born. In the autumn of 2009, she released her third album Colinde magice, covering Romanian traditional Christmas carols, colinde, as a special Christmas album. After three years, in 2012, Cleopatra released her fourth full-length studio album, Melodii Pentru Copii, but without the success she had with the past three albums.

She was chosen by Cartoon Network to dub the character Robotgirl in the Robotboy series.

== Albums ==
- La vârsta de 3 ani (2006, Pop Album, Total length: 38:16)
1. "Ghiță" – 3:17
2. "Cuțu" – 3:03
3. "Te-am întâlnit" – 2:34
4. "Șansa" – 2:22
5. "Noapte bună!" – 3:54
6. "Surprize" – 3:23
7. "Număr pân' la unu"
8. "Mama" – 3:58
9. "De ce?" – 4:15
10. "Zuzu-zuzu" – 2:08
11. "Oare cât?" – 2:01
12. "Pasărea pistruie" – 3:44
- La vârsta de 5 ani (2008, Pop Album, Total length: 32:25)
1. "Zunea-Zunea" – 2:59
2. "Elefantul și furnica" – 3:04
3. "Lupul, iezii și vizorul" – 4:17
4. "Vino, te aștept" – 3:00
5. "Cățeluș cu părul creț" – 3:28
6. "Dăruiește" – 3:45
7. "Gâște-gâște" – 2:43
8. "Melc-melc" – 2:42
9. "Refrenul dulcilor povești" – 3:00
10. "Va veni o zi într-o zi" – 3:27
- Crăciun Magic (Magic Christmas) (2009 Christmas Album, Total length: 43:48)
1. Domn, Domn, să-nălțăm (Lord, Lord Be Blessed) 3:10
2. Îngerii șoptesc (Angels Whisper) 3:38
3. Steaua sus răsare (The Star Rises Up) 2:44
4. Deschide ușa, Creștine (Open The Door, Christian) 5:33
5. A venit, a venit iarna (The Winter Has Come) 3:41
6. La Betleem colo-n jos (Down There In Bethlehem) 3:02
7. Într-un miez de noapte (In A Midnight) 3:50
8. Leru-i Doamne (Oh Lord) 4:19
9. Florile dalbe (White Flowers) 3:04
10. Seara de Crăciun frumos (Beautiful Christmas Night) 4:23
11. Astăzi s-a Născut Hristos (Christ Was Born Today) 2:42
12. Maria și Iosif colindă (Mary And Joseph Wander) 3:04
- Melodii Pentru Copii (2012) (1 June 2012)
1. "Când Voi Crește Mare"
2. "Moș Martin"
3. "Mama Mea e Cea Mai"
4. "Vesel Iepuraș"
5. "Frățiorul Meu"
6. "Trei Buburuze"
7. "Hopa-hop"
8. "Ursulețul Bambulică"
9. "Pentru Noi Doi"
10. "Parcul Zoologic"

== Awards and nominations ==
Year	Award	Category	Nominee(s)	Result	Ref.
2007	MTV Romania Music Awards	Best Song	"Ghiţă"	Won	
2007	MTV Romania Music Awards	Best New Artist	Herself	Won	
2019	Moldova Music Awards	Audience Award	Herself	Won	
2019	Moldova Music Awards	Zum FM Award	Herself	Won	

== See also ==
- List of certified albums in Romania
