= Dara (Moldovan singer) =

Nicoleta Dara
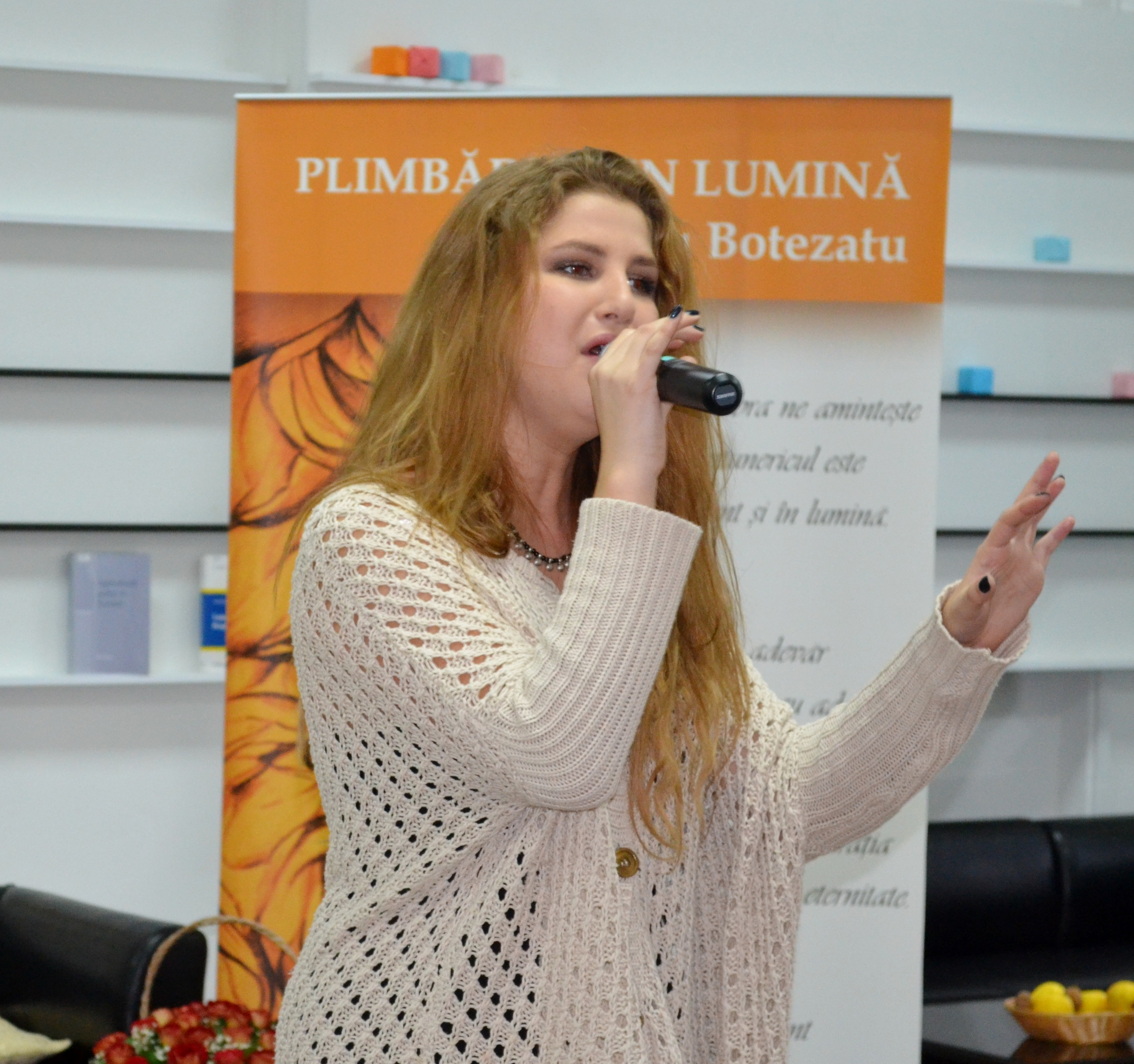
- Dara in 2010

Background information
- Also known as: Dara
- Born: Nicoleta Darabană; 22 May 1993 (age 33); Telenești, Moldova
- Genres: pop, Pop rock
- Occupations: Singer
- Instruments: Vocals
- Years active: 2000–present
- Label: Independent

Nicoleta Dara (born Nicoleta Darabană, on 22 May 1993 in Telenești), commonly known as Dara, is a Moldovan pop singer. She is well known for singing in preselection for Moldova in the Eurovision Song Contest in March 2012, where she sang her single "Open Your Eyes". She released her album Unsorted in 2011. The album was not a success, unlike her two previous singles. In late 2012, her fourth official single titled "Chains" was released via YouTube.

== Discography ==
- Unsorted (2011)

== Awards ==
- 2019: Muz FM Award by Moldova Music Awards
