= Mirabela Dauer =

Romanian female pop star

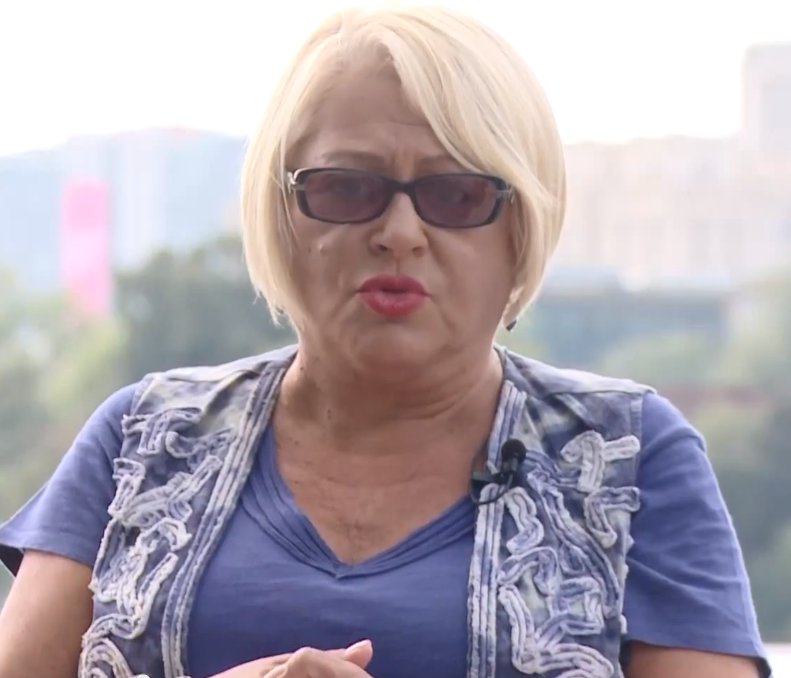
Mirabela Dauer, singer from Romania

Mirabela Dauer (Bucharest, 9 July 1947) is a Romanian female pop star who has been famous for muzică ușoară (easy listening) music of the 1980, 1990, 2000s. Her huge repertoire (over 600 songs) includes various genres of music.

In 2015 the artist was chosen by Walt Disney Pictures to provide the Romanian voice of a witch in the animated movie The Black Cauldron.
