= Andreea Bănică =

Romanian singer

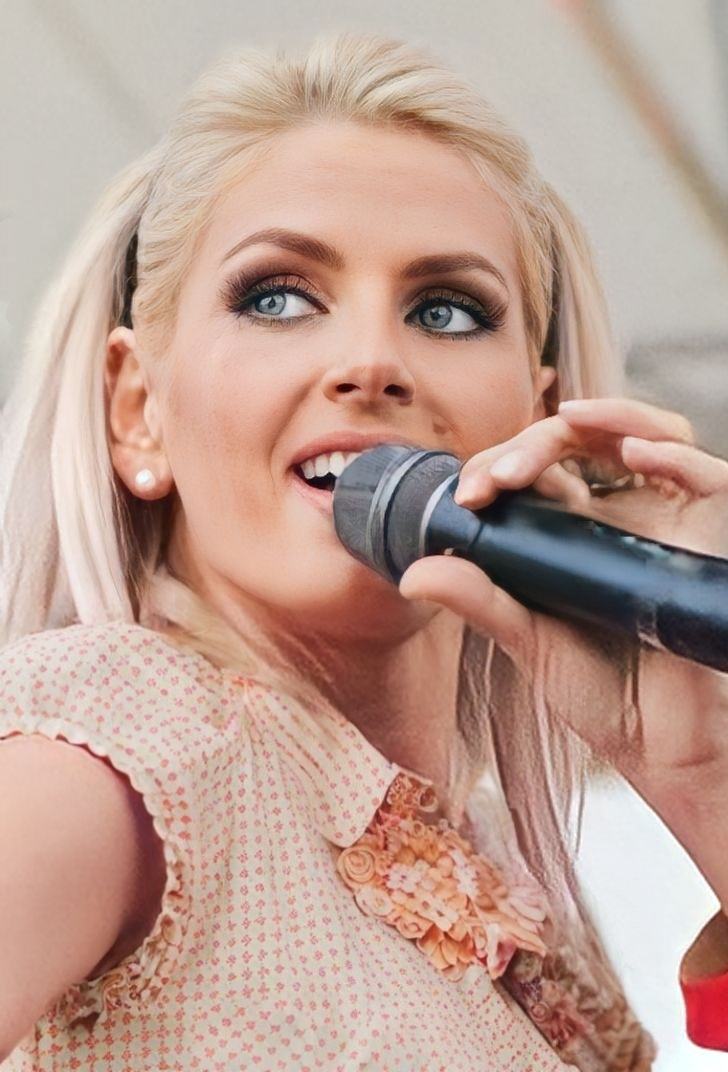
- Andreea Bănică in 2017
- Born: Andreea Bănică; 21 June 1978 (age 48); Constanța, Romania
- Education: Ovidius University
- Occupations: Singer; songwriter
- Years active: 1998–present
- Spouse: Lucian Mitrea (m. 2008)
- Children: 1
- Musical career
- Genres: Popcorn; Pop; dance; EDM
- Labels: Cat Music; Sony Music
- Formerly of: Exotic; Blondy
- Website: andreeabanica.com

Andreea Bănică (Romanian pronunciation: [anˈdree̯a bəˈnikə]; born 21 June 1978) is a Romanian singer and songwriter. She was part of the girl groups Exotic (1998–2000) and Blondy (2001–2005). In 2005, Bănică started a solo career and became one of Romania's most successful pop artists, with 2 number ones and 15 Top20 singles, as well as hit songs like "Love in Brasil", "Samba", "Hooky Song", "Sexy", "Shining Heart" and "Rain in July".

She also won various awards, including the Romanian Music Awards, Romanian Top Hits, MTV European Music Awards and the Balkan Music Awards. Bănică speaks Romanian, English, Spanish and Brazilian-Portuguese.

== Career ==
She first came to public attention at the 1998 Mamaia Festival. Along with Claudia Pătrăşcanu and Julia Chelaru, she started the group Exotic. In the two years they were together, the group released three singles ("Watch me", "Sexy" and "A Kiss"), and recorded two albums: Sexxy and Passionate.

Bănică started her solo career after leaving Exotic. In 2001, together with Rus, she formed the group Blondy. The group released three albums (So Close, Part of You, Sweet and Bitter) and a replay. Altogether, Blondy released six videos, and won the award for best dance band offered by Radio Romania in 2003. Rus left the band in 2005, launching a solo career. Bănică continued with Blondy. Dansez, Dansez, an album composed by Laurentiu Duta, achieved gold status for sales. Two singles were released, "Lovers" and "Sweet and Bitter".

Bănică single "Fiesta" gave her a number one hit on the Romanian charts. She received an MTV award for "Best Solo Artist." After that, she performed under her own name.

Her second solo album was entitled Rendez-vous, from which "Fiesta" was released as a single. The second single from this album was "Rendez-vous".

In 2008 she released a new video for the song "Trust", directed by Dragos Buliga. In the spring of that year she released "Hooky Song" featuring Smiley, with a video directed by Iulian Moga.

She released a video for the song "Le Ri Ra" in March 2009 despite being pregnant. In August 2009, a new single, "Samba", was released in collaboration with Dony. This single won her the RMA Best Video award in 2010. In early 2011, a Best Of collection was released. At the RRA Awards, her 2011 song "Love in Brazil" was named best Latin dance song.

In 2019 the singer was chosen by Walt Disney Pictures to provide the Romanian voice of Juarez in the live-action G-Force and in the movie Mummies.

== Discography ==
=== Studio albums ===
List of studio albums
| Title | Album details | Certifications |
|---|---|---|
| Dansez, Dansez (Note: Despite the Blondy group disbanding in 2005, Bănică kept signing as "Blondy", as a solo artist, until 2007.) | Released: 12 September 2005; Format: CD, digital download; Label: Cat Music | |
| Rendez-Vous | Released: 23 May 2007; Format: CD, digital download; Label: Cat Music | UPFR: Gold |

=== Compilation ===
List of studio albums
| Title | Album details |
|---|---|
| Best of Andreea Banica | Released: 22 February 2011; Format: CD, digital download; Label: Cat Music |

=== Singles ===
==== As lead artist ====
List of singles, with selected chart positions
| Title | Year | Peak chart positions | | | | | | Album |
| Title | Year | ROM | BLR | BUL | CIS | GRE | MOL | Album |
|---|---|---|---|---|---|---|---|---|
| "Dansez" (featuring Laurențiu Duță) | 2005 | 14 | — | — | — | — | — | Dansez, Dansez |
| "Indragostiti" | 2005 | 32 | — | — | — | — | — | Dansez, Dansez |
| "Fiesta" | 2006 | 2 | — | — | — | — | — | Rendez-vous |
| "Rendez-vous" | 2007 | 14 | — | — | — | — | — | Rendez-vous |
| "Incredere" | 2008 | 38 | — | — | — | — | — | Rendez-vous |
| "Hooky Song" (featuring Smiley) | 2008 | 8 | — | — | — | — | — | Best of Andreea Bănică |
| "Le Ri Ra" | 2009 | 8 | — | — | — | — | — | Best of Andreea Bănică |
| "Samba" (featuring Dony) | 2009 | 2 | 4 | 4 | 64 | — | — | Best of Andreea Bănică |
| "Love in Brasil" | 2010 | 1 | 4 | 5 | — | 70 | — | Best of Andreea Bănică |
| "Sexy" | 2011 | 3 | — | 23 | 232 | — | — | Non-album singles |
| "Electrified" | 2011 | 9 | — | 35 | — | — | — | Non-album singles |
| "Shining Heart" (with Laurențiu Duță) | 2012 | 1 | — | — | 198 | 17 | 5 | Non-album singles |
| "Could U" | 2012 | 8 | — | 10 | — | — | — | Non-album singles |
| "În Lipsa Ta" (featuring What's UP) | 2013 | 9 | — | — | — | — | — | Non-album singles |
| "Rupem Boxele" (featuring Shift) | 2014 | 11 | — | — | — | — | — | Non-album singles |
| "Același Iubit" | 2014 | 18 | — | — | — | — | — | Non-album singles |
| "Doi" (featuring Kaira) | 2015 | 28 | — | — | — | — | — | Non-album singles |
| "Supererou" | 2015 | 44 | — | — | — | — | — | Non-album singles |
| "Flori de Busuioc" (featuring Adrian Sina) | 2016 | 84 | — | — | — | — | — | Non-album singles |
| "Rain in July" (featuring Jorge) | 2016 | 9 | — | — | — | — | — | Non-album singles |
| "Linda" (featuring Veo) | 2017 | 19 | — | — | — | — | — | Non-album singles |
| "Departamentul de Relatii" (featuring UDDI) | 2017 | 25 | — | — | — | — | — | Non-album singles |
| "Ce Vrei de la Mine" (featuring Balkan) | 2017 | 91 | — | — | — | — | — | Non-album singles |
| "Egoísta" (featuring Nonis G) | 2018 | — | — | — | — | — | — | Non-album singles |
| "De Nebuna" | 2019 | — | — | — | 175 | — | — | Non-album singles |
| "Dragoste Incercata" (with Dorian Popa) | 2021 | — | — | — | — | — | — | Non-album singles |
"—" denotes releases that did not chart or were not released in that territory.

==== As featured artist ====
List of singles, with selected chart positions
| Title | Year | Peak chart positions | | Album |
| Title | Year | ROM | US Dance | Album |
|---|---|---|---|---|
| "Vreau Sa Mai Stai Doar o Zi" (Direcția 5 featuring Andreea Bănică) | 2002 | 17 | — | Duete |
| "Red Lips" (Aggro Santos featuring Andreea Bănică) | 2015 | — | 13 | Non-album singles |
| "Ale" (Narcotic Sound & Christian D featuring Andreea Bănică) | 2015 | 7 | — | Non-album singles |
| "Una Palabra" (Sunrise Inc. featuring Andreea Bănică) | 2015 | 5 | — | Non-album singles |
| "Sun Comes Up" (Livin E and Anjelo featuring Andreea Bănică) | 2017 | — | — | Non-album singles |
"—" denotes releases that did not chart or were not released in that territory.

=== Promotional singles ===
List of singles
| Title | Year | Album |
|---|---|---|
| "Black Sea Queen" | 2008 | Rendez-vous |
| "Bumerang" (featuring Kio) | 2013 | Non-album singles |
| "Hoț de Inimi" | 2015 | Non-album singles |
| "Fie Ca Vrei, Fie Ca Nu" (featuring Oana Radu) | 2016 | Non-album singles |
| "Numai Iubire (Christmas Love)" | 2022 | Non-album singles |

== Filmography ==
=== Television ===
| Year | Title | Role |
|---|---|---|
| 2017 | Bravo, Ai Stil! | Presenter |

=== Film ===
| Year | Title | Role | Notes |
|---|---|---|---|
| 2019 | G-Force! | Juarez (voice) | Romanian dub 2009 film |
| 2023 | Mummies | Nefer (voice) | Romanian dub |

== Awards and nominations ==
| Year | Award | Category | Work | Result | Ref. |
|---|---|---|---|---|---|
| 2006 | MTV Europe Music Awards | Best Romanian Act | Andreea Bănică as Blondy (as solo artist) (Note: In 2005 the pop group Blondy disbanded after the departure of Cristina Rus, but Bănică kept signing as "Blondy", as a solo artist, until 2007. She released the solo album 'Dansez, Dansez' as Blondy.) | Nominated | |
| 2006 | Romanian Music Awards | Best Female Song | "Indragostiti" | Nominated | |
| 2007 | MTV Europe Music Awards | Best Romanian Act | Andreea Bănică | Won | |
| 2007 | Top Hits Awards | The Best Hit: Girls | "Rendez-vous" | Nominated | |
| 2007 | Romanian Music Awards | Best Song | "Rendez-vous" | Nominated | |
| 2007 | Romanian Music Awards | Best Female Song | "Rendez-vous" | Nominated | |
| 2007 | Romanian Music Awards | Best Pop Song | "Rendez-vous" | Nominated | |
| 2007 | Romanian Music Awards | Best Video | "Rendez-vous" | Nominated | |
| 2007 | Romanian Music Awards | Best Album | Rendez-vous | Nominated | |
| 2008 | Romanian Music Awards | Best Female Song | "Hooky Song" | Won | |
| 2008 | Romanian Music Awards | Best Pop Song | "Hooky Song" | Nominated | |
| 2008 | Romanian Music Awards | Best Video | "Hooky Song" | Nominated | |
| 2009 | RRA Awards | Best Pop/Dance Song | "Hooky Song" | Nominated | |
| 2009 | RRA Awards | Best Dance/Pop Act | Andreea Bănică | Nominated | |
| 2009 | Romanian Music Awards | Best Female Song | "Le Ri Ra" | Won | |
| 2009 | Romanian Music Awards | Best Video | "Le Ri Ra" | Won | |
| 2009 | Romanian Music Awards | Best Pop Song | "Le Ri Ra" | Nominated | |
| 2010 | RRA Awards | Best Pop/Dance Song | "Samba" | Nominated | |
| 2010 | RRA Awards | Best Dance/Pop Act | Andreea Bănică | Nominated | |
| 2010 | Romanian Music Awards | Best Video | "Samba" | Won | |
| 2010 | Romanian Music Awards | Best Song | "Samba" | Nominated | |
| 2010 | Romanian Music Awards | Best Female Song | "Samba" | Nominated | |
| 2010 | Romanian Music Awards | Best Pop Song | "Samba" | Nominated | |
| 2010 | Romanian Music Awards | Best Website | andreeabanica.com | Nominated | |
| 2011 | RRA Awards | Best Latin Crossover | "Love in Brasil" | Won | |
| 2011 | RRA Awards | Best Pop/Dance Song | "Love in Brasil" | Nominated | |
| 2011 | Romanian Music Awards | Best Video | "Sexy" | Won | |
| 2011 | Romanian Music Awards | Best Show | Andreea Bănică | Won | |
| 2011 | Romanian Music Awards | Best Song | "Love in Brasil" | Nominated | |
| 2011 | Romanian Music Awards | Best Female Song | "Love in Brasil" | Nominated | |
| 2011 | Romanian Music Awards | Best Website | andreeabanica.com | Nominated | |
| 2011 | Balkan Music Awards | Best Video | "Love in Brasil" | Won | |
| 2011 | Balkan Music Awards | Best Song from Romania | "Love in Brasil" | Nominated | |
| 2012 | Romanian Music Awards | Best Song | "Shining Heart" (with Laurențiu Duță) | Won | |
| 2012 | Romanian Music Awards | Best Dance Song | "Shining Heart" (with Laurențiu Duță) | Nominated | |
| 2012 | Romanian Music Awards | Best Video | "Shining Heart" (with Laurențiu Duță) | Nominated | |
| 2012 | Romanian Music Awards | Best Female Song | "Electrified" | Nominated | |
| 2012 | Romanian Music Awards | Best Live Performance | Andreea Bănică | Nominated | |
| 2012 | Romanian Music Awards | Best Website | andreeabanica.com | Nominated | |
| 2012 | Media Music Awards | Best Dance Song | "Shining Heart" (with Laurențiu Duță) | Won | |
| 2013 | RRA Awards | Best Pop/Dance Song | "Shining Heart" (with Laurențiu Duță) | Nominated | |
| 2013 | RRA Awards | Best Dance/Pop Act | Andreea Bănică | Nominated | |
| 2013 | Romanian Music Awards | Best Pop Song | "In Lipsa Ta" | Won | |
| 2013 | Romanian Music Awards | Best Video | "In Lipsa Ta" | Won | |
| 2013 | Romanian Music Awards | Best Female Song | "In Lipsa Ta" | Nominated | |
| 2014 | RRA Awards | Best Female Singer | Andreea Bănică | Nominated | |
| 2014 | RRA Awards | Best Pop Song | "În Lipsa Ta" | Nominated | |
| 2014 | Romanian Music Awards | Best Female Song | "Rupem Boxele" | Nominated | |
| 2014 | Romanian Music Awards | Best Social Media | Andreea Bănică | Nominated | |
| 2014 | Media Music Awards | Fans Like Award | Andreea Bănică | Nominated | |
| 2015 | Media Music Awards | Fans Like Award | Andreea Bănică | Nominated | |

== See also ==
- List of music released by Romanian artists that has charted in major music markets
