= MTV România =

- Final logo used from July 1, 2011 to March 1, 2019
- Network: MTV Networks Europe

Ownership
- Owner: Music Television Systems (2002-2008); Central European Media Enterprises (Pro TV SRL) (2008-2019)

History
- Launched: June 15, 2002; March 1, 2019 (as a Romanian subfeed of MTV Europe)
- Replaced: MCM
- Closed: March 1, 2019 (As a localised Romanian feed)
- Replaced by: MTV Global

Links
- Website: www.mtv.ro

MTV România was a Romanian pay television channel that was launched on 15 June 2002 as the 10th regional channel of MTV in Europe (and second eastern European after MTV Poland) with a big concert ceremony performed by Enrique Iglesias on Lia Manoliu Stadium. It took the broadcast license previously used by MCM România, which was a franchise of the French music channel MCM.

On March 1, 2019, at midnight, MTV Romania was closed down and replaced by MTV Global with Romanian subtitles and local advertising. The final song to be played on the channel was I Did It, Mama! by Alexandra Stan.

== Programming ==
=== 2002–2007 ===
Several shows are made locally, featuring Romanian music and artists. Some of the most popular shows on the channel are the Romanian version of Total Request Live, Hitlist Romania and Dance Floor Chart. MTV România also showed reality shows mainly American but also local, like Dance Star in 2006. Since its launch, the channel also aired several TV shows and cartoons, like The Osbournes, Yo Momma, Pimp My Ride, Punk'd, Boiling Points, Daria, Beavis and Butt-Head, Where My Dogs At?. Several classic shows are still on after many years, mainly Party Zone, Stylissimo, Yo! MTV Raps. Other shows such as local versions of Chill Out Zone, Alternative Nation or Superock used to be aired on MTV România.

== MTV Day ==
Also, each year MTV România celebrates its birthday with a big concert called MTV Day. During the time, MTV România took part in several social campaigns in collaboration with the authorities of Romania. Among them, one can find MTV Exit or Staying Alive.

== TRL Romania ==
MTV România launched TRL România on 23 January 2007, aired from an Orange concept store on Calea Victoriei (a major commercial avenue in the center of Bucharest). The show airs two times a week, on Tuesday and Wednesday, while the international version is still shown on other weekdays. The graphic is similar to that of the Italian version.

Main Romanian hosts for MTV România are Ella Voineag, VJ Oana, Laura Cosoi and DJ Dox. Some of the former hosts of the channel are Diana Munteanu, Liviu Stanciu, Cristina Cepraga, DJ Wanda, VJ Raru (Cornel Moraru), Mircea Zara, Vj Karina, Raluca Balajel, Marian Nedelcu and Radu Vâlcan.

== MTV Romania Music Awards ==
MTV România held between 2002 and 2007, in a different city, an award show (similar to the MTV Video Music Awards) aimed at the Romanian music industry with special guests from abroad. Among the international artists that attended the show are Sugababes, Scooter, Kevin Lyttle, Kosheen, Laura Pausini, Uniting Nations, Dina Vass, Sylver, Pachanga and others. The show was held three times in Bucharest, one time in Cluj-Napoca and Sibiu and is usually held during June.

== See also ==
- Pro TV
