= Iris (Romanian band) =

Romanian rock band

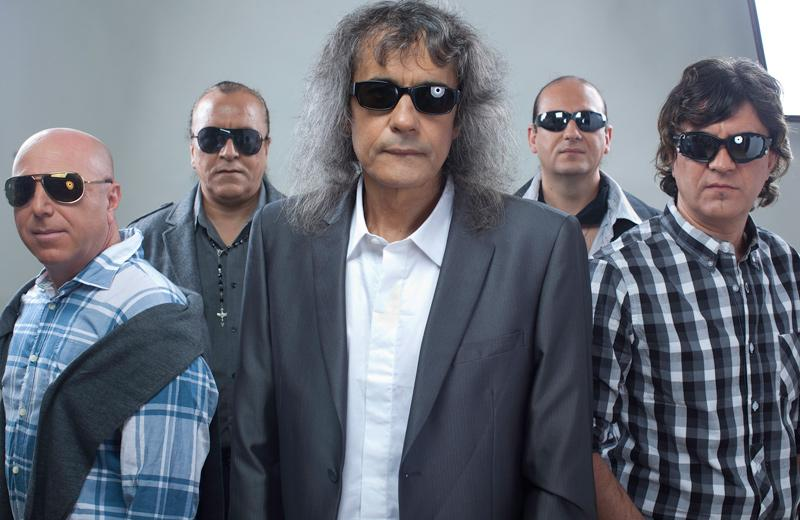
- Iris, 2010, the classic lineup, before the breakup into two bands. From left to right: Valter Popa, Nelu Dumitrescu, Cristi Minculescu, Relu Marin, Doru Borobeică

Background information
- Also known as: Naționala de Rock a României; Iris Nelu Dumitrescu; Iris Cristi Minculescu, Valter & Boro
- Origin: Bucharest, Romania
- Genres: Rock
- Years active: 1977–present
- Labels: Electrecord, Zone Records, Roton, Cat Music, MediaPro Music
- Members: Iris Nelu Dumitrescu: Nelu Dumitrescu (drums); Nuțu Olteanu (guitar); Relu Marin (keyboards); Costi Sandu (vocals); Matei Cioca (guitar); Tibi Duțu (bass); Cristi Lucian Dumitrescu (drums) Iris Cristi Minculescu, Valter & Boro: Cristian Minculescu (vocals); Doru Borobeică (bass); Valter Popa (guitar); Mihai Dumitrescu (drums)
- Website: Iris Nelu Dumitrescu official site

Iris is a Romanian rock band established in 1977 by Ioan 'Nelu' Dumitrescu (drums), Ion 'Nuțu' Olteanu (lead solo guitar and vocals) and Emil Lechințeanu (bass guitar). They achieved success, followed by tours throughout Romania and recordings for radio broadcast. At the 2006 MTV Romania Music Awards, Iris won the Best Rock Award and were nominated for Best Band and Best Live Act.

== History ==
Iris began in 1975–1976 with Emil Lechințeanu, Ioan 'Nelu' Dumitrescu and Ion 'Nuțu' Olteanu. Through the years, the band has experienced many line-up changes. First appearance on an album was in 1978 with the song "Corabia cu pânze" on "Formații de muzică pop III" compilation album. At the beginning of the 1980s, Ioan 'Nelu' Dumitrescu, Ion 'Nuțu' Olteanu (guitar) and Cristian 'Cristi' Minculescu, who are still present in the current line-up, played with Florin Ochescu (guitar) and Mihai 'Marty' Popescu (bass guitar). Together they released a debut-album, Iris I, which included songs that became some of the most popular Romanian rock songs: "Doar pentru voi" ("Only for You"), "Trenul fără naș" ("The Train without a Ticket-Collector"), "Pe ape" ("On Water"), and "Cei ce vor fi" ("Those to Come").

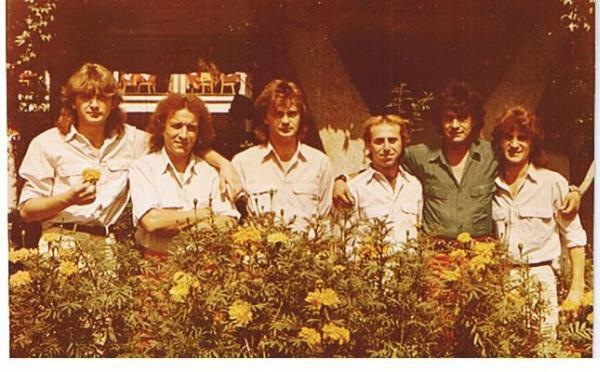
Iris, Eforie Nord, 1986. From left to right: Mihai Alexandru, Ioan 'Nelu' Dumitrescu, Eugen Sălceanu 'Brebu', Valter Popa, Cristian Minculescu, Doru Borobeică 'Boro'.

In 1987, Iris II was released with an extravagant cover depicting the communist regime, a cover which represented one of Cristian 'Cristi' Minculescu's idols, Angus Young, "in action". The band's line-up was Cristian 'Cristi' Minculescu (vocal), Ioan 'Nelu' Dumitrescu (drums), Valter Popa (guitar), Mihai Alexandru (guitar, vocal) and Doru 'Boro' Borobeică (bass guitar). On this album, notable songs included "Strada ta" ("Your Street"), "În parc" ("In the Park"), and "Zi și noapte" ("Day and Night").

One year later, Iris released its third album, Nu te opri ("Don't Stop"), which featured the same line-up as Iris II. The disc contained eight tracks, but the most important are "Floare de iris" ("Iris Flower"), "Uită tot ce‑a fost" ("Forget All That Was"), "Eu și cu tine" ("Me and You"), "Ploaia de vise" ("Rain of Dreams").

In December 1989, when the downfall of the Romanian communist regime began, Iris recorded the album Iris IV in Tomis Studio, without Mihai Alexandru, but with Cristian 'Cristi' Minculescu, Ion 'Nuțu' Olteanu, Doru 'Boro' Borobeică and Valter Popa. Hits from this album include "De ce oare ai plecat?" ("Why Did You Leave Me?"), "Vino iar" ("Come Again"), "Rock and roll", and "Cine mă strigă în noapte?" ("Who Is Calling Me in the Night?").

In 1992, Iris held an anniversary concert called Iris 15 ANI ("Iris 15 years") at Sala Polivalentă in Bucharest in front of 10,000 people. This was a record audience for a Romanian band, unequalled since that time. That same year, at the Cannes Festival, Iris won second place in the rock section and they appeared on MTV.

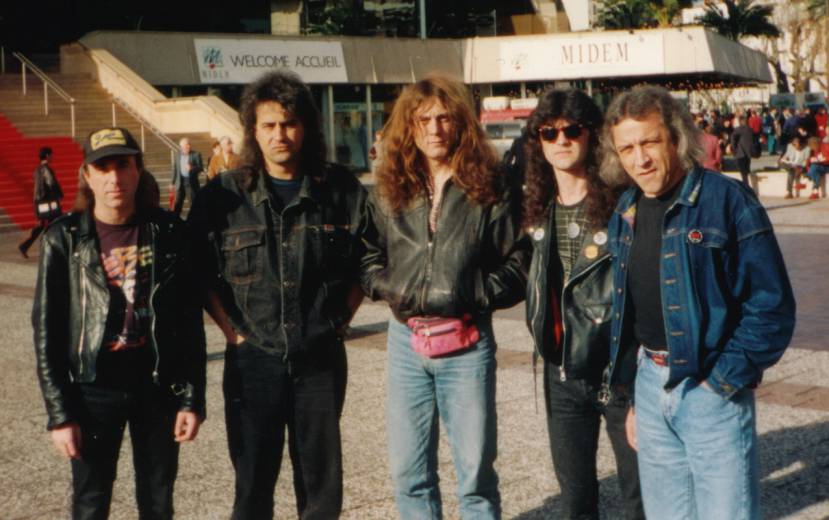
Iris, Cannes, 1993. From left to right: Valter Popa, Cristi Minculescu, Dan Alex Sârbu, Boro, Nelu Dumitrescu.

The fifth Iris album was named 1993 and was recorded with the Iris IV line-up, plus guitarist Dan Alex Sârbu. Iris played in Italy and on the Malboro Tour, in the big cities of Romania. In July 1996, following Dorian Ciubuc's idea, Iris signed a contract with Polygram for 6 years. In this time, Iris recorded 6 albums. In October 1998, they released Mirage, an album with a union of tracks and orchestration. The album was co-authored with Mihai Godoroja.

In 1997 on 17 October, Iris celebrated 20 years of existence with a live performance in Bucharest, featuring both active and former band members. Three weeks later, the band released a celebratory album entitled "20 DE ANI" (20 years). The album has 13 tracks from the live concert.

In 2000 the band began their largest tour to support their album Athenaeum. Two years later, DIGITAL ATHENAEUM, a DVD featuring recordings of concerts on the tour, was released. In 2002, the "Iris 25 Years" concert gathered thousands in the biggest concert hall in the country. The next album, Mătase albă ("White Silk") featured ballads, such as "Iubire fără de sfârșit" ("Endless Love") and a cover version of "Lady in Black" by Uriah Heep, which won an MTV Music Award. This album was followed by 4Motion and, in 2005, Iris Maxima. The most notable ballad on Iris Maxima is "Vino pentru totdeauna" ("Come Back for Always").

On 5 October 2007, the band was honored by the Romanian president Traian Băsescu for 30 years of contributions to Romanian culture. On the same day, the band performed in a live show in the front of over 15,000 fans.

In 2009, frontman Cristian 'Cristi' Minculescu underwent a liver transplant. The costs of the surgery was partly covered by the Romanian Ministry of Health. The minister of health at the time, Ion Bazac, stated: "It is a sign of respect and gratitude for an artist who has delighted our souls".

On 8 October 2009, the band performed in the first big concert after the liver transplant. On the occasion of this live performance, Integral Iris, a boxset comprising the band's entire discography, was released.

On 22 June 2012 Iris held an anniversary concert in Piața Constituției, marking release os album "Iris 35". At spectacle was presented multimedia projections with moments from band history, and soprano Felicia Filip sang Iris melody "De vei pleca".

On 3 September 2012, Minculescu, who had been with the band since 1980, stepped down and was replaced by Tony Șeicărescu. On 25 June 2013 Toni Șeicărescu left the group, on the background of some disagreements with Ioan 'Nelu' Dumitrescu, being replaced by Rafael Cătălin Paul Ciobotaru. In April 2015, Cristian 'Cristi' Minculescu returned to Iris.

In 2017, Cristi Minculescu, Valter Popa, and Doru "Boro" Borobeica leave the band. A year after their departure (2018), Nelu Dumitrescu (the drummer) registers the name of the band "Iris" as a trade mark. The trio (Cristi, Valter, and Boro) go to court and ask for the cancellation of the trade mark "Iris" arguing that the respective the trade mark was registered by Nelu Dumitrescu without their approval.

In June 2020, the Romanian court decided that the trade mark "Iris" will be used from hereon by both parties. The court mentions that the trade mark will no longer be called "Iris" but "Iris" together with the name of each member of the band (their first and/or last names). Currently the 2 bands have changed their names and trade marks as following: "Iris Cristi Minculescu, Valter & Boro" and "Iris Nelu Dumitrescu". Currently, in Romania, there is no band registered with the trade mark "Iris" only.

== Band members ==
=== Current ===
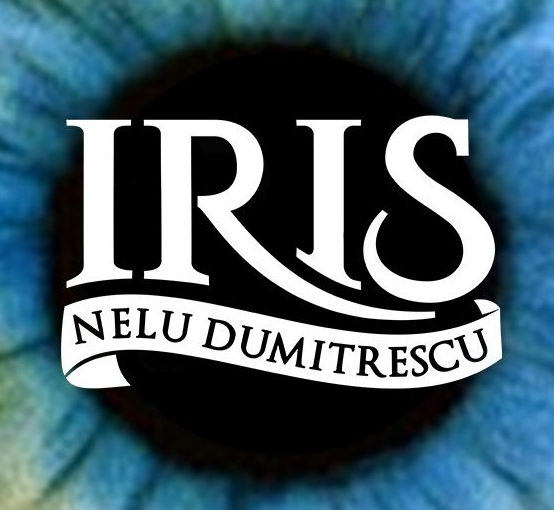

Iris Nelu Dumitrescu

- Ioan 'Nelu' Dumitrescu – drums, percussion, backing vocals (1977–1980, 1981–present)
- Ion 'Nuțu' Olteanu – guitar, vocals (1977–1980, 1981–1986, 2017 – present)
- Aurelian 'Relu' Marin – keyboards, piano, backing vocals (2002–present)
- Constantin 'Costi' Sandu – lead vocals (2017–present)
- Matei Cioca – guitar, backing vocals (2019–present)
- Tibi Duțu – bass (2021–present)
- Cristi Lucian Dumitrescu – drums, percussion (2017–present)

Iris Cristi Minculescu, Valter & Boro

- Cristian 'Cristi' Minculescu – lead vocals (1980-1982, 1983, 1985-2012, 2015 - present)
- Doru Borobeică 'Boro' – bass, backing vocals (1984-1988, 1988–present)
- Valter Popa – guitar, backing vocals (1986–present)
- Mihai Dumitrescu – drums, percussion (2017–present)

=== Former ===
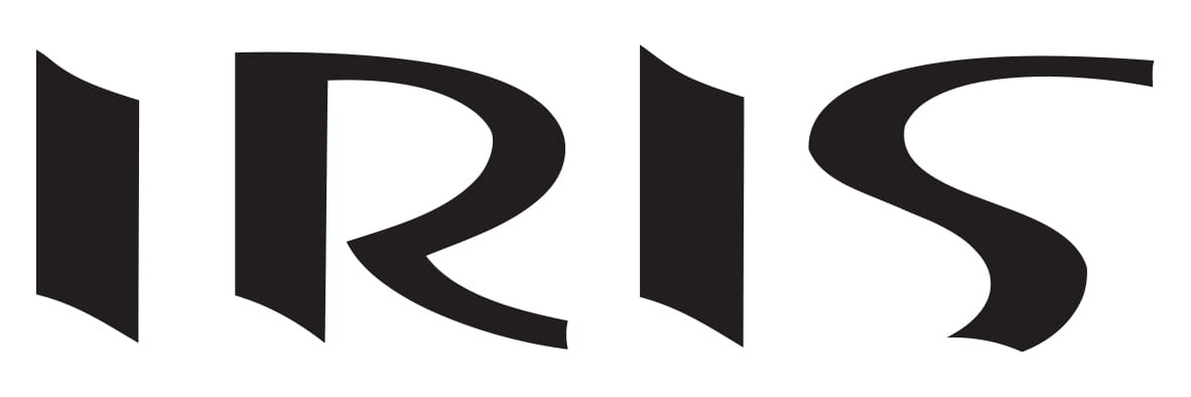
Iris official logo (used between 1996 and 2020)

- Emil 'Brando' Lechințeanu – bass (1977-1978)
- Sorin Chifiriuc – guitar, bass, vocals (1978-1980)
- Ion 'Nelu' Jecan – lead vocals (1978)
- Lucian Chivu – lead vocals (1978-1980)
- Mihai 'Marty' Popescu – bass (1979-1980, 1981-1984)
- Anton Hașiaș – bass (1980-1981)
- Clement Iordănescu – guitar (1980)
- Florin Ochescu – guitar (1980, 1982-1984)
- Adrian George Ilie – guitar, backing vocals (1980-1982, 1984-1985)
- Gelu Ștefan – drums (1980)
- Valeriu Neamțu 'Gălăgie' – drums (1980-1981)
- Nicky Dinescu – drums (1981)
- Marin Iliescu – bass (1981)
- Gelu Vintilă – guitar (1981)
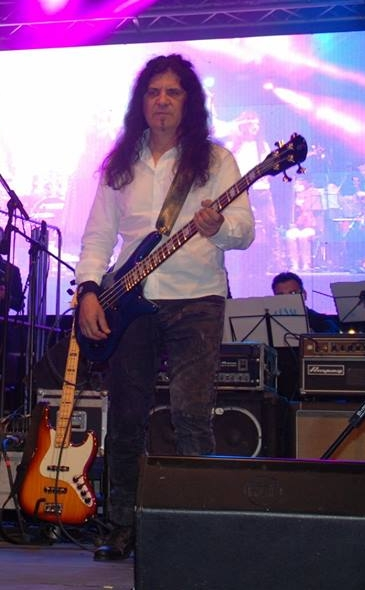
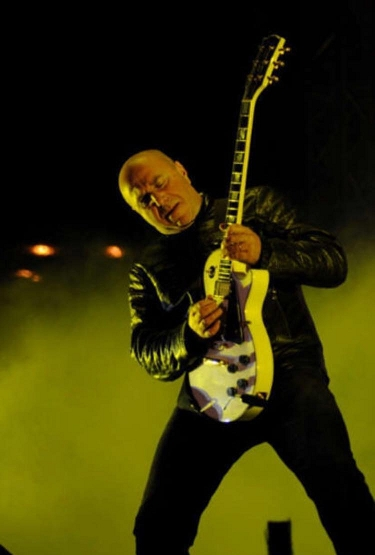
Doru Borobeică and Valter Popa. They joined the band in November 1984 and February 1986.
- Dan Bădulescu – guitar (1982)
- Geo Stănică – lead vocals (1982)
- Sanda Lăcătușu – lead vocals (1982-1983)
- Dan Bittman – lead vocals (1984-1985)
- Bogdan Stănescu – guitar (1985-1986)
- Mihai Alexandru – guitar, backing vocals (1986-1989)
- Nelu Popovici – bass (1988)
- Dan Alex Sârbu – guitar (1989-1990, 1990-1994)
- Manuel Savu – guitar (1990)
- Tony Șeicărescu – lead vocals (2012-2013)
- Rafael (Cătălin Paul Ciubotaru) – lead vocals (2013-2015)
- Alin Moise – guitar (2017-2018) ^{1}
- Andrei Bălașa – guitar (2018-2019) ^{1}
- George Costinescu – bass (2017-2019) ^{1}
- Daniel Moroiu – bass (2019-2021) ^{1}

Note: ^{1} – former member of Iris Nelu Dumitrescu

== Discography ==
=== Studio albums ===
- Iris I (LP, Electrecord, 1984)
- Iris II (LP/MC, Electrecord, 1987)
- Iris III – Nu te opri! (Iris III – Don't Stop!) (LP/MC, Electrecord, 1988)
- Iris IV (LP/MC, Electrecord, 1990)
- Iris 1993 (LP/MC, Electrecord, 1993)
- Lună plină (Full Moon) (CD/MC, Zone Records, 1996)
- Mirage (CD/MC, Zone Records, 1998)
- Iris 2000 (CD/MC, Zone Records, 1999)
- Mătase albă (White Silk) (CD/MC, Zone Records, 2002)
- I.R.I.S. 4Motion (4xCD/4xMC, Zone Records, 2003)
- Iris Maxima (CD/MC, Zone Records, 2005)
- Cei ce vor fi – Vol. I (Those Who Will Be – Vol. I) (CD/MC, Roton, 2007)
- Cei ce vor fi – Vol. II (Those Who Will Be – Vol. II) (CD/MC, Roton, 2007)
- 12 porți (12 Gates) (CD/MC, Roton, 2010)
- O lume doar a lor – 35 de ani (A World Only for Themselves – 35 Years) (CD, Cat Music, 2012)
- Lumea toată e un circ (All the World Is a Circus) (CD/2xLP, MediaPro Music & Universal Music România, 2018)
- Zodiac (CD/LP, MediaPro Music & Universal Music România, 2022)

=== Maxi-singles ===
- Casino (CD/MC, Zone Records, 1999)
- De vei pleca... (If You Went Away...) (CD/MC, Zone Records, 2000) (featuring Felicia Filip)
- Da, da, eu ştiu! (Oh, Yes, I Know!) (CD/MC, Zone Records, 2002)

=== Live albums ===
- Iris 20 de ani (Iris 20 Years) (CD/MC, Zone Records, 1997)
- Iris Athenaeum – Vol. I (CD/MC, Zone Records, 2000)
- Iris Athenaeum – Vol. II (CD/MC, Zone Records, 2000)

=== Compilations ===
- The Best of Iris (CD, Electrecord, 1993)
- Muzică de colecție, Vol. 22 – Iris (Collection Music, Vol. 22 – Iris) (CD, Roton, 2007, with Jurnalul Național newspaper)
- Legenda merge mai departe (The Legend Goes On) (CD, Roton, 2009, with Adevărul newspaper)

=== Video albums ===
- Iris Digital Athenaeum (DVD/VHS, Zone Records, 2001) (reissued in 2010)
- Iris Aeterna – Dăruind vei dobândi (Iris Aeterna – Giving You Will Acquire) (DVD, Roton, 2010)

=== Box sets ===
- Integrala Iris (21xCD, Roton, 2009) (1984–2007 discography reissue)

=== Tribute albums ===
- Trooper: Gloria – Tribut pentru Iris (The Glory – Tribute to Iris) (CD, self-released, 2006)

=== Books ===
- Miron Ghiu Caia: Iris: spectacolul abia începe (Iris: The Show Is Just Beginning) (Humanitas, Muzzak Collection, 2003)

== Awards ==
- 2006: MTV Romanian Music Awards – Best Rock

== Bibliography ==
- Miron Ghiu-Caia. Iris: spectacolul abia începe (Iris: The Show Is Just Beginning) (Humanitas, Muzzak Collection, 2003). ISBN 973-50-0477-1
