= Felicia Filip =

Romanian operatic soprano

- Born: 20 March 1959 (age 66); Slatina, Romanian People's Republic
- Education: Ciprian Porumbescu Conservatory
- Occupation: Operatic soprano
- Years active: 1985–present

Ana Felicia Filip (Romanian pronunciation: [ˈana feˈlit͡ʃi.a ˈfilip]; born 20 March 1959, Slatina) is a Romanian operatic soprano. She has sung in the Royal Opera House Covent Garden, the Vienna State Opera and the Liceu in Barcelona. Since 2014, she is the director of the Comic Opera for Children in Bucharest.

== Awards ==
- 1983 Francisco Viñas Singing Contest Barcelona First Prize and Mozart Prize
- 1985 International Tchaikovsky Competition - Moscow Second Prize
- 1987 Belvedere International Singing Competitions - Vienna Second Prize, Mozart Prize and Japanese Prize
- 1991 "The Glory of Mozart" Singing Competition - Toronto First Prize
