= Florin Chilian =

Romanian musician

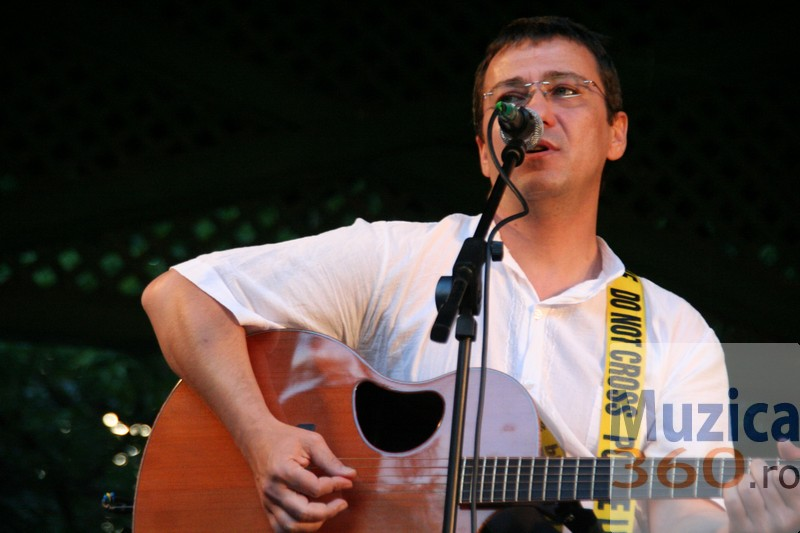
- Florin Chilian in concert (2010)

Background information
- Born: 14 December 1968 (age 57); Bucharest, Romania
- Genres: Folk; Pop; Chamber
- Occupations: Musician, composer, vocalist
- Instrument: guitar
- Years active: 1986–present
- Labels: Soft Records, Roton, Luna PR & Events
- Website: chilian.ro

Florin Chilian (born 14 December 1968) is a Romanian musician.

== Biography ==
Florin Chilian was born in 1968 in Bucharest in a poor family. His parents got separated early in his childhood.

=== Musical career ===
He started playing music in Rubin, a group created by him. Between 1984 and 1987, he got the first prize in Cântarea României.

In 1985, as he was part of the audience in a concert performed by Valeriu Sterian and his sound company, he discovers "Shambala", a song performed by Doru Stănculescu. And this song will change his life. He decides to give up cycling and starts playing the guitar. In 1985, after giving up sports, in order to make a living, he becomes a technician working for Valeriu Sterian's band.

In 2001, he released his first album, Iubi - Interface to Reality. The album was initially refused by all the Romanian record labels. Eventually he manages to put it on the market at Soft Records. Romulus Arhire was the one who helped him put the album on the market at Soft Records. In 2002, Florin Chilian has his first concert as a professional artist. But the album is still not broadcast on radio or TV. It contains two hits: "Iubi" and "Chiar dacă".

In 2004 he signed a contract with Roton record label and in September of the same year he released his second album Ten Commandments, Report of the State of the Nation, 1989-2004. The First Step, which contains the hit "Zece". The album is based on the musical interpretation of the 10 Bible Commandments. Radio and TV stations still refuse to play "Zece".

His song "Zece" was widely broadcast on radio and TV, and on YouTube it was the first Romanian song to reach the first million views and later over 10 million views. The artist was awarded with Gold record and Platinum record for sales by Roton record label.

In 2007 he re-edited the first album Iubi - Interface to Reality and one month after his release, he was awarded with Gold record and Platinum record for sales by Roton record label.

In June 2010 he released his third album, The Autist, Do not Go Down on Brâncuşi!. The artist was awarded with Gold record and Platinum record for sales by Roton record label.

In 2017, he released the album Pre@Clasic at the Luna PR & Events record label. Pre@Clasic is a reinterpretation of classical music, the album is conceived and written entirely for string quartet - chamber music and voice. Through this album, he invented a new musical genre combining pop with pre-classic music.

Between 2005 and 2009, at the suggestion of Florian Pittiş, he presented a talk show at Radio Romania Youth.

Between 2007-2009, he had his own heading column in the Jurnalul Național, signing an editorial weekly. He also signed editions in the Cotidianul newspaper.

For all his musical works he is composer, lyricist and performer.

He is member of the Union of Composers and Musicologists from Romania and PRS.

== Awards ==
During his career, Florin Chilian received the following awards:

- First place at the Music Festival Om Bun
- Album Iubi - Interface to Reality awarded with Gold record, Platinum record by Roton
- Album The Autist, Do not Go Down on Brâncuşi! awarded with Gold record, Platinum record by Roton
- Album Ten Commandments, Report of the State of the Nation, 1989-2004. The First Step awarded with Gold record, Platinum record by Roton
- Awarded at "Romanian Music Awards Best Male" 2008 Florin Chilian with the song "Chiar dacă" from the album Iubi - Interface to Reality by Music Channel Romania
- Awarded "2017 year's album" for "Pre@Clasic" by Radio România Actualităţi

== Main musical creations ==
- Zece (English translation Ten)
- Chiar dacă
- Iubi
- Nevastă-mea
- Imnul de stat

== Discography ==
- 2001 - Iubi - Interface to Reality
- 2004 - Ten Commandments, Report of the State of the Nation, 1989-2004. The First Step
- 2010 - The Autist, Do not Go Down on Brâncuşi!
- 2017 - Pre@Clasic
- 2019 - PlânSuRâsul

== TV Series ==
- Cu un pas înainte (2007) ProTV.
