= Voltaj =

Romanian pop rock band

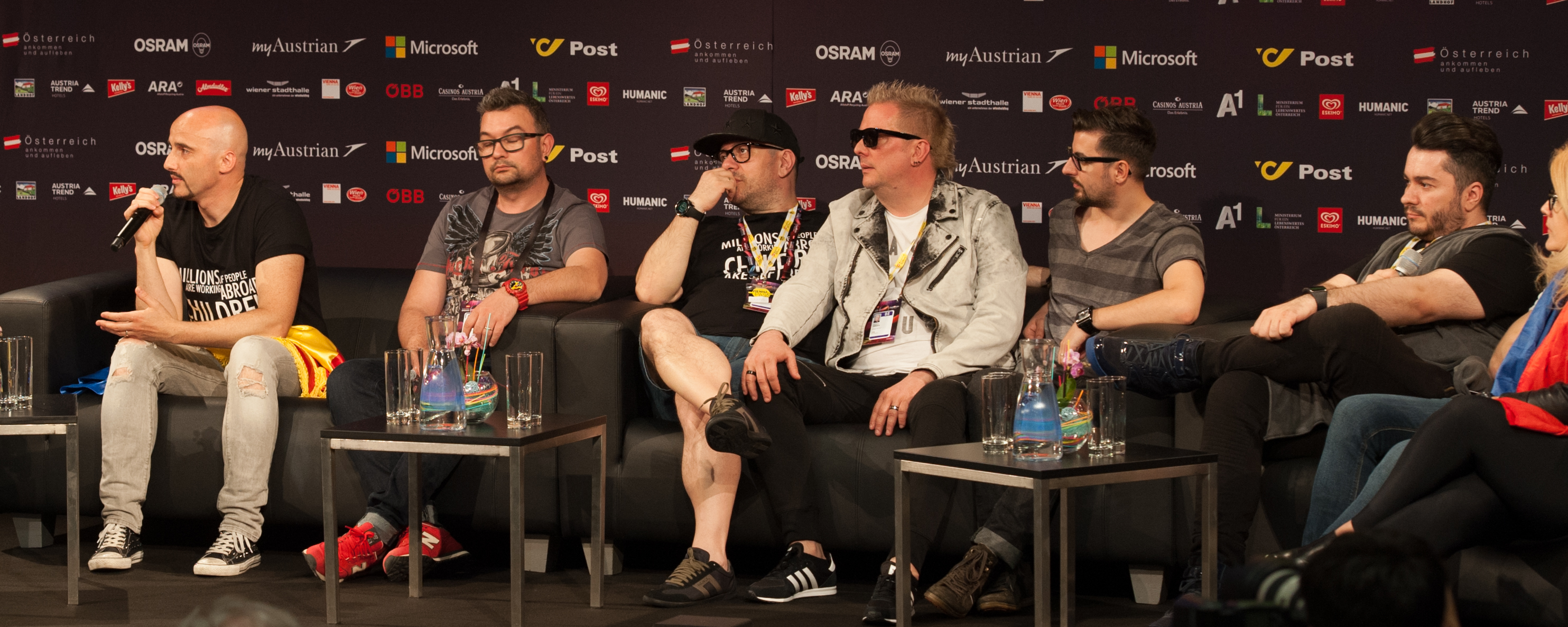
- Voltaj in 2015

Background information
- Origin: Bucharest, Romania
- Genres: Electropop; pop rock; pop; trip hop; house; downtempo; ambient; alternative rock; techno; dance-pop; synth-pop; electronic rock; hard rock (early); heavy metal (early)
- Years active: 1982–present
- Labels: Roton, Cat Music, Electrecord
- Members: Călin Goia (voice); Gabi "Porcus" Constantin (guitar); Adrian M. Cristescu (keyboards); Valeriu "Prunus" Ionescu (bass); Oliver Sterian (drums)
- Past members: Cristi Minculescu (voice); Adrian Ilie (guitar); Dan Cimpoieru (guitar); Horațiu Rad (bass); Nikki Dinescu (drums); Gabi Nacu (guitar); Cristi Ilie (voice); Amedeo Bolohoi (guitar); Dan Mateescu (bass); Doru "M.S." Istudor (drums); Bogdan Cristea (voice); Cristi Marinescu (guitar); Doru Borobeică (bass); Manuel Savu (guitar); Eugen "Brebu" Sălceanu (keyboards); Florin "Dog" Ionescu (drums); Paul "Pampon" Neacșu (drums); Bobby "Bobiță" Stoica (keyboards); Tavi Colen (vocals)
- Website: www.voltaj.ro

Voltaj (pronounced [volˈtaʒ]; Romanian for 'voltage') is a Romanian pop rock group. They are widely regarded as one of the most successful bands in Romanian history, known for popular songs such as "20", "De la capăt" and "De mâine" being household hits.

== History ==
Voltaj was formed in 1982, in Bucharest, by: Horațiu Rad on bass, Nikki Dinescu (Krypton) on drums, Gabi Nacu (Krypton) on guitar, Cristi Minculescu (Iris) on vocals and Adrian Ilie (Iris) on guitar. Their sound at the time was on the heavier side of hard rock, being one of the earliest examples of traditional heavy metal in the Romanian scene.

During this period there were numerous changes in the line-up, all the disputes even spawning a second Voltaj, known as Voltaj 88', which also managed to release a couple of albums during the '90s.

By the time of their 1996 debut, "Pericol de Moarte", only drummer Nikki Dinescu was left from the original line-up. The album, which also features Tavi Colen Talisman on vocals, is their only record in the heavy metal style.

Starting with 1998 the two remaining members, bass player Vali Ionescu, and guitar player Gabi Constantin recruit a new line-up, with Bobby Stoica on keyboards which brought Călin Goia on vocals on board. With Goia's vocals and creative mind, the group rapidly grew in success and fame. With the release of the album, "Risc Maxim 2", the group switches its style to electronic-influenced pop-rock music. In 2002 they were joined by Oliver Sterian (son of Valeriu Sterian) on drums. Releasing numerous hit singles like "20 ani", "Albinuța", "De mâine", "De la capăt" and "Doar pentru ea", they have become one of the most widely-known groups in Romania.

They won the Best Romanian Act award at the MTV Europe Music Awards 2005. After winning Selecția Națională 2015, they represented Romania in the Eurovision Song Contest 2015 with the song "De la capăt", where they progressed out of their semi-final group to place 15th in the Final with 35 points.

== Band members ==
=== Current members ===
- Călin Goia (vocals)
- Gabi "Porcus" Constantin (electric guitar)
- Adrian Cristescu (keyboards)
- Valeriu "Prunus" Ionescu (bass guitar)
- Oliver Sterian (drums)

=== Former members ===
- Cristi Minculescu (voice)
- Adrian Ilie (guitar)
- Dan Cimpoieru (guitar)
- Horațiu Rad (bass)
- Nikki Dinescu (drums)
- Gabi Nacu (guitar)
- Cristi Ilie (voice)
- Amedeo Bolohoi (guitar)
- Dan Mateescu (bass)
- Doru "M.S." Istudor (drums)
- Bogdan Cristea (voice)
- Cristi Marinescu (guitar)
- Doru Borobeică (bass)
- Manuel Savu (guitar)
- Eugen "Brebu" Sălceanu (keyboards)
- Florin "Dog" Ionescu (drums)
- Paul "Pampon" Neacșu (drums)
- Bobby "Bobiță" Stoica (keyboards)
- Tavi Colen (vocals)

== Discography ==
=== Studio albums ===
Title	Details
Pericol de moarte (Deadly Danger)	Released: 1996; Labels: Roton Music; Formats: Download, CD, Cassette
Risk Maxim 2	Released: 1999; Labels: Roton Music; Formats: Download, CD, Cassette
Bungee	Released: 2000; Labels: Roton Music; Formats: Download, CD, Cassette
3D	Released: 2001; Labels: Cat Music; Formats: Download, CD, Cassette
424	Released: 2002; Labels: Cat Music; Formats: Download, CD, Cassette
Povestea oricui (Anyone's Story)	Released: 2004; Labels: Cat Music; Formats: Download, CD, Cassette
Revelator	Released: 2006; Labels: Cat Music; Formats: Download, CD, Cassette
V8	Released: 2009; Labels: Cat Music; Formats: Download, CD
Dă vina pe Voltaj (Blame Voltaj)	Released: 2012; Labels: Cat Music; Formats: Download, CD
X	Released: 2016; Labels: Cat Music; Formats: Download, CD
Ca La 20 De Ani	Released: 2019; Labels: Cat Music; Formats: Download, CD

=== Compilation albums ===
Title	Details
Best of Voltaj	Released: 2003; Labels: Cat Music; Formats: Download, CD, 2 Volume Cassette
Integrala Voltaj (+ Voltaj's book)	Released: 2005; Labels: Cat Music; Formats: Download, CD
Remix	Released: 2005; Labels: Cat Music; Formats: Download, CD
Doza ta de muzică Voltaj (Your Dose of Voltaj Music)	Released: 2006; Labels: Cat Music; Formats: Download, CD

=== Singles ===
==== As lead artist ====
Title	Year	Peak chart positions		Album
Title	Year	AUT	ICE	Album
"Asta-i viaţa" (That's Life)	1999	—	—	Risk Maxim 2
"...Tu" (You)	2002	—	—	424
"Scrisoare" (Letter)	2002	—	—	424
"Noapte bună" (Good Night)	2003	—	—	424
"One Day I'll Win"	2005	—	—	Remix
"Da vina pe voltaj"	2012	—	—	Da vina pe voltaj
"Meci De Box"	2014	—	—	X
"De la capăt"	2014	70	48	X
"Om"	2020	—	—	X

"—" denotes a single that did not chart or was not released in that territory.

==== As featured artist ====
Title	Year	Album
"Vocea Ta" (Cabron featuring Voltaj)	2014	Lupu'DPM

Awards and achievements
Preceded by Paula Seling and Ovi with "Miracle"	Romania in the Eurovision Song Contest; 2015	Succeeded by Ilinca and Alex Florea with "Yodel It!"
