= Animal X =

Romanian band

Animal-x
- Origin: Constanţa, România
- Genres: Dance; R&B; Rock; Drum and bass House
- Years active: 1999 - 2015
- Labels: Nova Music, Music&Music, A&A Records, Media Pro Music
- Members: Şerban Copoț (Hienă); Laurenţiu Penca (Vierme); Lazăr Cercel (Tzapu); George Belu (Martzianu); Alexandru Ivanus (Greiere)
- Past members: Alexandru Salman (Lizard)
- Website: animalx.org

Animal X was a Romanian band awarded at MTV Europe Music Awards, with more than 10 years of musical experience. Their eight studio albums include such hits as "N-am crezut", "Pentru ea", "Fără tine", "Mai mult ca oricând", "Să pot ierta", "Băieți derbedei", "Balada", and "Nisip purtat de vânt".

The band disbanded in 2015.

== Band members ==
- Şerban Miron Copoț (Hyena) - July 2, 1981 - vocals
- Laurenţiu Penca (Worm) - September 5, 1983 - voice2, synth
- George Valentin Belu (Martian Boy) - July 28, 1983 - guitar
- Lazar Cercel (King Goat) - November 28, 1981 - bass
- Alexandru Ivanus (Cricket) - September 29, 1986 - drums
- Alexandru Salaman (Lizzard) - February 8, 1982 – 2010 - voice

== Performances ==
- 1999 - May 15 – first official appearance on local TV in Constanța, Animal X is made up by Hyena, Worm and Lizard
- 2000 – First album release, named “Animal X”
- 2000 - “N-am crezut” (Can’t Believe) is the first Romanian song to stay in Top100 for 18 weeks
- 2000 - “3rd Millennium” tour – 21 cities, around 940 000 spectators
- 2000 - “Iubirea mea” (My Love) is the fastest ascending song in Romanian music charts
- 2000 - Second great tour, the “Internet Generation”, covering 36cities and over 1,4mil. spectators
- 2001 - “Level 2” album hits daylight
- 2001 - “Pentru ea” (to her) stays No1 in RT100 for 5 weeks
- 2001 - "Fără tine" (without you) stays No1 in RT100 for 4 weeks
- 2001 - “Best Dance Music” award – Mamaia festival
- 2001 - “Best Dance Music” award – Romanian Music Industry Awards
- 2001 - 3rd studio release, “Virtual” album
- 2001 - “Sa pot ierta” (To Forgive..) is the first Romanian single to stay in radio charts for 23 weeks; it also stays No1 in RT100 for 3 weeks in January-February 2002
- 2001 - “The Masters of House Music award”, Romanian Music Industry Awards
- 2002 - “Revolution” album release
- 2002 - “Best Dance Music award”, Romanian Music Industry Awards
- 2002 - “Best Romanian Act award” - M.T.V. Europe EMA Barcelona, first of its kind in Romania
- 2002 - “Say no to drugs Tour”, 34cities, with over2,2mil. spectators; CNN declares it “the biggest social campaign in Eastern Europe”
- 2003 - 4 nominations and “Best Album award”, MTV Romanian Music Awards
- 2004 - “FunRaptor” album release
- 2005 - Animal X attends the Chinese European Fest, live broadcast by CCTV and Shanghai TV
- 2005 - Member martian boy, King Goat and Cricket join the band
- 2006 – “Derbedei” (Rebel boys) album release
- 2006 - “Best feat. award”, Romanian Top Hit Awards, Bacau City
- 2006 - Animal X attends the “Zaragoza Global” International Urban Music Fest, Spain
- 2006 - “The Green Generation” foundation takes shape, founded by Animal X
- 2007 – First “Best of” album is released
- 2007 - “Best Rock award”, Romanian Top Hit, Bacau City
- 2007 - Novamusic Entertainment Label grants a 5 Diamond Disk award for exceptional Animal X entire career sales and a Golden Disk award for the “Best of”album
- 2008 – September – Animal X signs with Mediapro Music Label
- 2008 - October – the 8th studio album, “Sâmbure de drac” (Devil in Disguise)
- 2008 - October - First single is released, called “Nisip purtat de vânt” (Sand in the wind)
- 2009 – January – “Confidential”, award for the “Nisip purtat de vânt” single
- 2009 - 3 nominations at Romanian Top Hit Awards
- 2009 – '“Unii dintre noi” single'
- 2010 – January - Lizard leaves the band
- 2010 - March – new single release, “Love philosophy”
- 2010 - March–June – 69 concerts at Globus Circus&Variety within “4U” Show

== Discography ==
- Animal X - 2000, EP, Nova Music
- Level 2 - 2001, LP, Nova Music
- Virtual - 2001 EP, Nova Music
- Revolution - 2002, LP, Music&Music
- FunRaptor - 2004 LP, A&A Records
- baieti derbedei - 2006, LP, Nova Music
- Best Of - 2007 LP, Nova Music
- sambure de drac - 2008, LP, MediaPro Music
