= Activ (band) =

Romanian Europop/Eurodance band

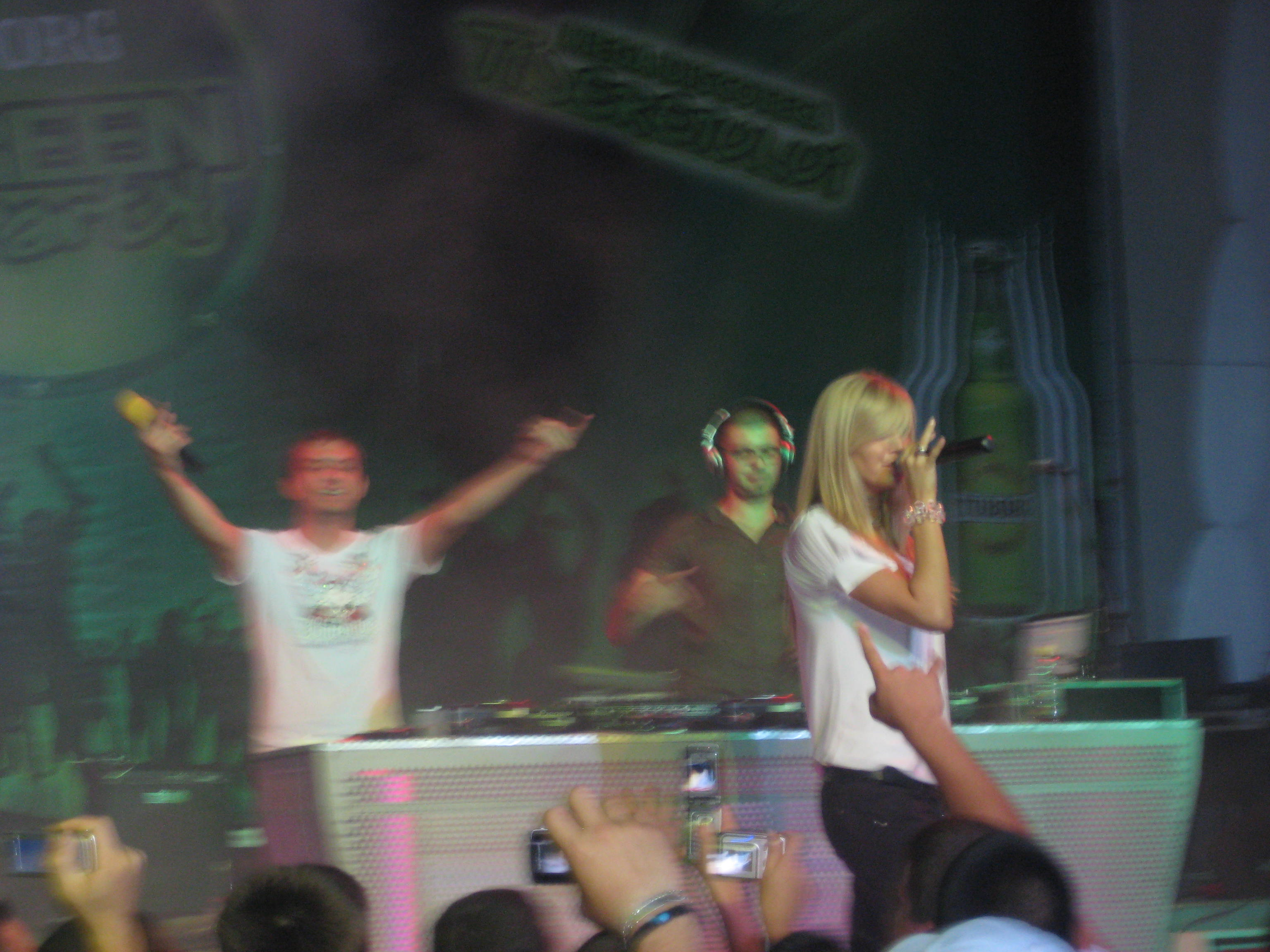
- Activ performing at Mega Discoteca Tineretului in Costinești, (foreground) Oana, (background) Rudi and Avi

Background information
- Origin: Romania
- Genres: Europop
- Years active: 1999–2010
- Labels: Media Service; Roton-present
- Members: Rudolf Ştefanic (Rudi); Oana Nistor (Oana); Flaviu Cicirean (Avi)

Activ was a Romanian europop/eurodance band. The members (Oana, Rudi and Avi) are from Arad and Timișoara.

== Success ==
The albums Motive and Superstar were quite successful. Hit songs from these albums included "Visez 2004" ("I Dream") and "Doar cu tine" ("Only with you") from Motive, "Superstar", "Zile cu Tine" ("Days with You") and "Lucruri simple" ("Simple Things") from Superstar. The album Everyday contains many songs in English included the hit singles: "Reasons", "Without U", "Music Is Drivin Me Crazy", "Feel good" (feat. DJ Optick) and "Under my skin".

The group split in 2010.

== Discography ==
- Sunete (1999)
- În Transă (2002)
- Motive (2004)
- Superstar (2005)
- Everyday (2007)
