= List of Moldovans =

This is a list of notable people, of all ethnicities, born in the Republic of Moldova, the Moldavian SSR or the historical province of Bessarabia.

== Artists and architects ==
- Baruch Agadati, Palestinian-Israeli classical ballet dancer, choreographer, painter, and film producer and director
- Tudor Cataraga, sculptor
- Nachum Gutman, Teleneşti-born Israeli painter, sculptor, and author
- Valentin Mednek, architect
- Andrei Mudrea, painter
- Alexandru Plămădeală, sculptor
- Mihai Petric, painter
- Alexey Shchusev, Russian architect
- Tudor Zbârnea, painter

== Writers ==
- Alexandru Donici, poet and translator
- Ion Creanga, writer
- Alexei Mateevici, poet and publicist
- Alexandru Hâjdeu, writer
- Alecu Russo, writer
- Victor Ciobanu, writer and specialist in agriculture
- Bogdan Petriceicu-Hasdeu, writer and historian
- Constantin Stamati, writer and translator
- Constantin Stamati-Ciurea, writer and translator
- Constantin Stere, writer
- Dumitru Matcovschi, poet
- Grigore Vieru, poet and writer
- Ion Anton, poet and writer
- Ion Druță, novelist
- Ion Vatamanu, poet
- Ion Hadârcă, writer
- Lidia Kulikovski, librarian, bibliographer and editor
- Liviu Damian, poet
- Mihai Eminescu, poet, novelist, and journalist
- Petru Cărare, poet and epigrammatist
- Sorana Gurian, writer
- Vasile Vasilache, writer
- Victor Teleucă, writer and poet
- Vladimir Beșleagă, novelist
- Sergiu Moraru, folklorist

== Musicians ==
- Eugen Doga
- Maria Bieșu
- Maria Cebotari
- Sofia Rotaru
- Anatol Dumitras
- Nicolae Glib
- Anastasia Lazariuc
- Ion Suruceanu
- Nelly Ciobanu
- Zdob şi Zdub
- Anna Odobescu, singer and actress
- Valentina Naforniță, soprano opera singer
- Dan Bălan, pop singer
- Arsenie Todiraș, pop singer
- Natalia Barbu, pop singer
- Maria Bieșu, opera singer
- Geta Burlacu, singer
- Maria Cebotari, opera singer
- Mihai Dolgan, pop singer
- Valeriu Găină, guitarist
- Lidia Isac, pop singer
- Radu Marian, opera singer
- Sofia Rotaru, pop singer
- Radu Sîrbu, pop singer
- Pavel Stratan, folk singer
- Vika Jigulina, pop singer made famous for her hit Stereo Love
- Mark Zeltser, concert pianist
- Andrew Rayel, trance producer and DJ
- Sergey Stepanov, saxophonist, feminist
- Misha Miller, pop singer
- Satoshi (singer)

== Composers ==
- Ion Aldea-Teodorovici, singer
- Eugen Coca
- Eugen Doga
- Arkady Luxemburg
- Gavriil Musicescu
- Stefan Neaga

== Scientists ==
- Lev Berg, Russian biologist and geographer
- George de Bothezat (Gheorghe Botezatu), engineer and pioneer of helicopter flight
- Ștefan Ciobanu, historian
- Nicolae Donici, astronomer
- Jerzy Neyman, Polish statistician
- Anatolie Kovarski, (1904–1974), agronomist
- Brigitta P. Kovarskaia (1930–1998) physicist, computer scientist, educator, and local historian
- Victor Kovarski (1929–2000), physicist
- Sergiu Rădăuțanu, physicist
- Nikolay Sclifosovsky, Russian surgeon and physiologist
- Nicolae Testemițanu, physician, surgeon and hygienist
- Timofei Moșneaga, physician, associate professor and former Minister of Health
- Nikolay Zelinsky, Russian chemist

== Athletes ==
- Radu Albot, first Moldovan tennis player to win an ATP title
- Olga Bolşova, athlete
- Alexandru Bratan, weightlifter
- Serghei Covalciuc, football player
- Ion Gonța, boxer
- Vitalie Grușac
- Nicolae Juravschi
- Tudor Casapu
- Boris Polak, Israeli world champion and Olympic sport shooter
- Naum Prokupets
- Alex Sherman
- Ion Cuțelaba, UFC fighter
- Serghei Spivac, UFC fighter
- Andrei Tchmil
- Vadim Vacarciuc
- Marina Shafir

== Businessmen ==
- Anatol Stati
- Gabriel Stati
- Ion Sturza
- Oleg Voronin
- Sam Zemurray

== Politicians ==
- Dumitru Braghiș, former Prime Minister of Moldova
- Dorin Chirtoacă, former Mayor of Chișinău
- Dumitru Diacov, former President of the Parliament
- Vladimir Filat, former Prime Minister of Moldova
- Mihai Ghimpu, former acting President of Moldova
- Avigdor Lieberman, Moldovan-born Israeli Member of the Knesset
- Petru Lucinschi, 2nd President of Moldova
- Tatiana Molcean, Executive Secretary of the United Nations Economic Commission for Europe (UNECE)
- Alexandru Moșanu, historian, 1st President of the Parliament
- Iurie Roșca, former Deputy Prime Minister
- Oleg Serebrian, political scientist and diplomat
- Mircea Snegur, 1st President of Moldova
- Vasile Tarlev, former Prime Minister of Moldova
- Stepan Topal, Gagauz politician and activist
- Serafim Urechean, former Mayor of Chișinău
- Vladimir Voronin, 3rd President of Moldova

== Other ==
- Daria Harjevschi, librarian who improved the services of the Chișinău Public Library
- Xenia Deli, fashion model
- Zvi Kogan, rabbi killed in the United Arab Emirates

== See also ==
- Moldovans
- Romanians
- List of Romanians
- Bessarabia
- Benderli Pashas
- List of rulers of Moldavia
