= Zaurbek Baysangurov =

Russian boxer

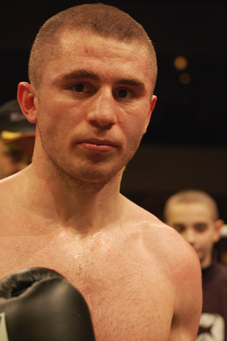

Personal information
- Nationality: Russian
- Born: Заурбек Мусаевич Байсангуров; March 2, 1985 (age 41) Achkhoy-Martan, Checheno-Ingush ASSR, Russian SFSR, Soviet Union
- Height: 5 ft 10 1/2 in (179 cm)
- Weight: Light middleweight; Middleweight

Boxing career
- Reach: 70 1/2 in (179 cm)
- Stance: Orthodox

Boxing record
- Total fights: 30
- Wins: 29
- Win by KO: 21
- Losses: 1
- Draws: 0
- No contests: 0
Medal record
Men's amateur boxing
Representing Russia
Junior World Championships
Bronze medal – third place	2002 Santiago de Cuba	63.5 kg
Cadet World Championships
Bronze medal – third place	2001 Baku	63.5 kg
Junior European Championships
Gold medal – first place	2003 Warsaw	69 kg
Cadet European Championships
Gold medal – first place	2001 Liverpool	57 kg

Zaurbek Musaevich Baysangurov (Russian: Заурбе́к Мусаевич Байсангу́ров, Chechen: Заурбек Мусаевич Байсангуров, born 2 March 1985) is a Russian former professional boxer who competed from 2004 to 2014. He is a former WBO and IBO light middleweight champion, having held the IBO title twice between 2010 and 2015 and the WBO title between 2011 and 2013. He held the European title between 2007 and 2008 and the WBA Inter-Continental title between 2009 and 2010. Zaurbek is an ethnic Chechen from the teip Terloy.

== Amateur career ==
In 2001, Baysangurov won the gold medal at the 2001 Russian Cadet National Championships in Rostov in June, he then won the gold medal at the 2001 Cadet European Championships in Liverpool, England in July, and went on to win a bronze medal at the 2001 Cadet World Championships in Baku, Azerbaijan in October.

In 2002, Baysangurov won the gold medal at the 2002 Russian Junior National Championships in Tyumen in May, and went on to win a bronze medal at the 2002 Junior World Championships in Santiago de Cuba in September.

In 2003, Baysangurov won the gold medal at the 2003 Junior European Championships in Warsaw, Poland in August.

=== Amateur highlights ===
- 2002 Junior World Championships bronze medalist.
  - Defeated Aslan Bayramov (Azerbaijan)
  - Defeated Hwang Ryong (South Korea)
  - Defeated Juan de Dios Navarro (Mexico)
  - Lost to Vilier Quinones (Cuba)
- 2003 Junior European Championships gold medalist.
  - Defeated Mindaugas Spakauskas (Lithuania)
  - Defeated Dian Petrov (Bulgaria)
  - Defeated Stefan Dragomir (Romania)
  - Defeated Sergiy Derevyanchenko (Ukraine)
  - Defeated Rakhib Beylarov (Azerbaijan)

== Professional career ==
Zaurbek Baysangurov made his professional debut in 2004 at the age of 20. He won the IBF Youth middleweight title in 2005, and held the IBF Youth light middleweight title from 2005 to 2006, and amassed a record of 14 wins with all but two by stoppage.

On 23 September 2006, Baysangurov faced Marco Antonio Rubio for the vacant WBC International title in Kyiv, Ukraine. Baysangurov was dropped by Rubio in the first round but bounced back to win the fight by unanimous decision outboxing his opponent to win the remaining eleven rounds on the judges' scorecards.

In May 2007, the EBU announced Baysangurov would face off against French boxer Hussein Bayram for the vacant European light middleweight title. On 7 July, he won the competitive bout by unanimous decision in Cologne, Germany. Two judges awarded the fight 114-113 and another 115-113 for Baysangurov.

In December 2008 he lost via an upset 5th-round KO to former The Contender star Cornelius Bundrage.

== Professional boxing record ==
30 fights	29 wins	1 loss
By knockout	21	1
By decision	8	0
By disqualification	0	0
Draws	0	
No contests	0	

No.	Result	Record	Opponent	Type	Round, time	Date	Location	Notes
30	Win	29–1	(Argentina) Guido Nicolas Pitto	TKO	12 (12), 2:58	2014-04-12	Ice Palace Terminal, Brovary, Ukraine	Won vacant IBO Super welterweight title.
29	Win	28–1	(Czech Republic) Lukas Konecny	UD	12	2012-10-06	Palace of Sports, Kyiv, Ukraine	Retained WBO Super welterweight title.
28	Win	27–1	(France) Michel Soro	UD	12	2012-05-12	Ice Palace Terminal, Brovary, Ukraine	Retained IBO & WBO Super welterweight titles.
27	Win	26–1	(Brazil) Mike Miranda	KO	1 (12), 0:51	2011-07-30	Sportpalace, Odesa, Ukraine	Won interim WBO Super welterweight title.
26	Win	25–1	(Colombia) Richard Gutierrez	TKO	12 (12), 2:36	2010-12-04	Ice Palace Terminal, Brovary, Ukraine	Won vacant IBO Super welterweight title.
25	Win	24–1	(Portugal) Eugenio Monteiro	RTD	3 (8), 3:00	16 Oct 2010	O2 World Hamburg, Hamburg, Germany	
24	Win	23–1	(Kosovo) Frank Shabani	RTD	5 (12), 3:00	2009-12-19	Sport Palace Yunost, Zaporizhzhia, Ukraine	Retained WBA Inter-Continental Super welterweight title.
23	Win	22–1	(Nigeria) Eromosele Albert	UD	12	2009-08-15	Dynamo, Grozny, Russia	Retained WBA Inter-Continental Super welterweight title.
22	Win	21–1	(Italy) Cristian De Martinis	KO	1 (12), 2:36	2009-05-30	Palace of Sports, Kyiv, Ukraine	Won vacant WBA Inter-Continental Super welterweight title.
21	Win	20–1	(Georgia (country)) Mikheil Khutsishvili	RTD	1 (8), 3:00	2009-04-22	Sport Palace Lokomotiv, Kharkiv, Ukraine	
20	Loss	19–1	(United States) Cornelius Bundrage	TKO	5 (12), 2:35	2008-12-13	SAP Arena, Mannheim, Germany	
19	Win	19–0	(Moldova) Ion Gonța	RTD	7 (12), 3:00	12 Jul 2008	Color Line Arena, Hamburg, Germany	Retained EBU European Super welterweight title.
18	Win	18–0	(Ukraine) Roman Dzhuman	TKO	8 (12), 1:24	2008-03-23	Sportpalace Meteor, Dnipropetrovsk, Ukraine	Retained EBU European Super welterweight title.
17	Win	17–0	(Romania) Gheorghe Danut	UD	10	2008-02-21	Palace of Sports, Kyiv, Ukraine	
16	Win	16–0	(France) Hussein Bayram	UD	12	2007-07-07	Kölnarena, Cologne, Germany	Won vacant EBU European Super welterweight title.
15	Win	15–0	(Mexico) Marco Antonio Rubio	UD	12	2006-09-23	Palace of Sports, Kyiv, Ukraine	Won vacant WBC International Super welterweight title.
14	Win	14–0	(Hungary) Laszlo Buranyi	KO	3 (10), 2:43	2006-04-08	AKKO International, Kyiv, Ukraine	Retained IBF Youth Super welterweight title.
13	Win	13–0	(Zambia) John Chibuta	TKO	9 (10), 2:23	2006-01-28	Tempodrom, Berlin, Germany	Retained IBF Youth Super welterweight title.
12	Win	12–0	(Argentina) Juan Manuel Alaggio	TKO	9 (10), 1:02	2005-12-10	Leipziger Arena, Leipzig, Germany	Won IBF Youth Super welterweight title.
11	Win	11–0	(Poland) Daniel Urbanski	RTD	8 (10), 3:00	2005-09-16	Sportpalace Meteor, Dnipropetrovsk, Ukraine	Won IBF Youth Middleweight title.
10	Win	10–0	(Belarus) Aliaksandr Shnip	TKO	5 (10)	2005-07-14	Night Club Milenium, Lviv, Ukraine	
9	Win	9–0	(France) Stephane Talliana	TKO	1 (8), 1:33	2005-04-23	Arena Westfalenhalle, Dortmund, Germany	
8	Win	8–0	(Russia) Vladimir Zavgorodniy	TKO	4 (6), 2:42	2005-02-24	Palace of Sports, Kyiv, Ukraine	
7	Win	7–0	(Turkey) Adnan Oezcoban	RTD	3 (6), 3:00	2005-02-12	Max-Schmeling-Halle, Berlin, Germany	
6	Win	6–0	(Argentina) Pablo Martin Paoliello	UD	6	2004-11-20	BigBox, Kempten, Germany	
5	Win	5–0	(Ukraine) Oleksandr Matviichuk	UD	6	2004-09-24	Sportpalace, Odesa, Ukraine	
4	Win	4–0	(Russia) Andrey Tylilyuk	TKO	2 (6), 2:48	2004-09-17	Dynamo Bar, Saint Petersburg, Russia	
3	Win	3–0	(Belarus) Dzmitri Kashkan	TKO	2 (6)	2004-07-16	Entertainment Center Aurora, Vitebsk, Belarus	
2	Win	2–0	(Belarus) Siarhei Navarka	KO	2 (4), 1:59	2004-07-06	Krylia Sovetov, Moscow, Russia	
1	Win	1–0	(Russia) Andrey Gibalo	TKO	3 (4), 0:57	2004-06-26	Zviozdniy Hall, Feodosia, Crimea, Ukraine	Professional debut

Sporting positions
Regional boxing titles
Vacant Title last held by Domenico Spada	IBF Youth middleweight champion 16 September 2005 – 2005; Vacated	Vacant Title next held by Grzegorz Proksa
Vacant Title last held by Reda Zam Zam	IBF Youth light middleweight champion 12 October 2005 – 2006; Vacated	Vacant Title next held by Salvatore Annunziata
Vacant Title last held by Joachim Alcine	WBC International light middleweight champion 30 May 2006 – 2007; Vacated	Vacant Title next held by Vincent Vuma
Vacant Title last held by Michele Piccirillo	European light middleweight champion 7 July 2007 – 2008; Vacated	Vacant Title next held by Jamie Moore
Vacant Title last held by Shane Mosley	WBA Inter-Continental light middleweight champion 30 May 2009 – 2010; Vacated	Vacant Title next held by Siarhei Rabchanka
Minor world boxing titles
Vacant Title last held by Attila Kovács	IBO light middleweight champion 4 December 2010 – 2012; Stripped	Vacant Title next held by Himself
Vacant Title last held by Himself	IBO light middleweight champion 12 April 2014 – 2015; Stripped	Vacant Title next held by Erislandy Lara
Major world boxing titles
Vacant Title last held by Alfredo Angulo	WBO light middleweight champion Interim title 30 July 2011 – 5 October 2011; Promoted	Vacant Title next held by Lukáš Konečný
Preceded by Serhiy Dzyndzyruk; Stripped	WBO light middleweight champion 5 October 2011 – June 2013; Stripped	Vacant Title next held by Demetrius Andrade
