= Moraru (surname) =

The Romanian-language surname Moraru literally meaning "miller" may refer to:

- Alexandru Moraru
- Anatolie Moraru
- Dumitru Moraru
- Gabriel Moraru
- Ion Moraru
- Liana Moraru
- Marin Moraru
- Mihai Moraru
- Mihail Moraru
- Șerban Moraru
- Sergiu Moraru
- Teodor Moraru
- Veronica Mihailov-Moraru
