= Jokero =

- One of the various cover artworks used to commercialize "Jokero".

Single by Akcent

from the album French Kiss with Kylie
- Released: 17 December 2005
- Studio: Gala Records
- Genre: Club
- Length: 4:02 (album version); 3:40 (radio edit)
- Label: Roton
- Songwriter: Marius Nedelcu
- Producers: Adi Colceru; Adrian Sînă

Akcent singles chronology
"Kylie" (2005)	"Jokero" (2005)	"French Kiss" (2006)

"Jokero" is a song by Romanian group Akcent for their fifth studio album French Kiss with Kylie (2006). Marius Nedelcu wrote the song, while Adi Colceru and Adrian Sînă produced it. The song was officially released on 17 December 2005, when it premiered on a Romanian radio station. In February 2006, "Jokero" was announced as one of the competing songs in Selecția Națională 2006, an event used to determine Romania's entry for the Eurovision Song Contest 2006. Akcent asked Romanian singer Nico to perform the track with them for the competition. The song came second overall, losing to Mihai Trăistariu's "Tornerò" (2006), though it won the public vote.

"Jokero" was received positively by most music critics, who noted its potential to become a hit song. Commercially, the song became the group's first number one in Romania and it reached the top ten in the Commonwealth of Independent States and Sweden. Two music videos were shot for the track. The first, directed by Dragos Buliga which depicts the group's members wandering through a town individually holding a disco ball. The second was recorded to promote the song during Selecția Națională, it features the group and Nico performing in one of TVR's studios. At the MTV Romania Music Awards 2006, the song was nominated for Best Song and Best Dance.

== Background and release ==
Akcent first performed "Jokero" in Istanbul in December 2005 at the end of a presentation about an interior design collection to "test" the public's reaction, with România liberă reporting that the song would be officially released as a single in Romania at the end of the year. It was sent to Romanian radio station SKRadio on 17 December 2005, where it was played for the first time during DJ Fr3cky's show. Akcent recorded the song at Gala Records, while Marius Nedelcu wrote it and Adi Colceru and Adrian Sînă produced it, with the former also handling the mixing. Furthermore, a vocalist named Georgiana provides additional vocals on it. The club track is sung in both English and Spanish. The song's radio edit version lasts for three minutes and 40 seconds, while the album one lasts for four minutes and two seconds. It was described by a România liberă editor as bringing "Ibiza closer to [the group's fans] soul". "Jokero" was released for digital download and streaming in the Benelux states on 15 May 2006 by Roton. It was issued in other territories on 5 July 2006 by Music Company Nordic.

== Selecția Națională 2006 ==
On 16 February 2006, "Jokero" was revealed as one of the songs submitted for Selecția Națională 2006, a competition to select the Romanian entrant for the Eurovision Song Contest 2006. Although the song was only credited to Akcent upon submission, they announced that they would perform the song alongside Romanian singer Nico, further clarifying that the collaboration was only meant for the Eurovision Song Contest, stating that her addition was to "present the song in a complete formula" and that after the event was over, they will "each continue with their own career". Prior to the event, "Jokero" was deemed a fan favorite as it received most of the votes from the public on a poll posted on TVR's website. The song qualified from the first semi-final, held on 24 February 2006 and it was fifth song performed in the final.

A Jurnalul editor gave the semi-final performance a negative review, claiming that Akcent performed "badly" while Nico sang "like from the inside of a barrel". Romanian composer Horia Moculescu expressed a similar opinion, stating that the group has "no chance" at representing Romania at the Eurovision Song Contest as they are "unable" to "perform live". While "Jokero" won the public vote during the final, which amounted to twelve points, it received eight points from the professional jury panel, finishing second behind Mihai Trăistariu's "Tornerò" (2006) in a two-point margin. Following the selection's outcome, the group acknowledged that they sang poorly. Akcent revealed that they were approached by the Moldovan delegation to submit their song for the Moldovan selection after Selecția Națională ended, ultimately deciding not to do so. In an interview with Crișana, they explained that even though they felt "honored" by the proposal, they could not have "taken part for another country" since they are Romanian.

== Reception ==
"Jokero" was received positively by most music critics. Although Moculescu was critical of the group's performance, he called the song "[a] hit". Romanian singer Costi Ioniță declared that "Jokero" had the "best chance of representing Romania in Athens". Libertatea's Petre Dobrescu noted that the song "brought [the group] out in the spotlight" in Western Europe and East Asia. Bianca Dumitru of Adevărul mentioned the song among other Romanian club songs responsible for the "club music madness" from 2006. In retrospect, Florin Grozea, also writing for Adevărul, stated in an article titled "Why Is It Good to Not Get First Place at Eurovision Romania" that the song "contributed to Akcent's international success" alongside "Kylie" (2005).

Commercially, "Jokero" became the group's first number one on the Romanian Top 100. It further reached the top ten in the Commonwealth of Independent States and Sweden, and achieved peak positions of 18 and 27 on the Dutch Top 40 and the Dutch Single Top 100, respectively. The song received nominations for Best Song and Best Dance at the MTV Romania Music Awards 2006, but lost to Morandi's "Beijo (Uh La La)" (2005) and DJ Project's "Șoapte" (2005), respectively.

== Promotion ==
Two music videos were shot for the song. The first was directed by Dragos Buliga, who saw the song "acting as a colorful stain" on a "sombre" town. In the video, the members are shown walking with a disco ball throughout a town separately and singing next to it, while interspersed shots of a woman dancing in a room are displayed. At the end of the video, the members are all shown briefly with her in the room, before quickly vanishing. The group filmed another video alongside Nico, in TVR's studios, which acted as promotion for the song for Selecția Națională and was broadcast on TVR during the week of the event. It depicts Akcent and Nico performing in a white studio.

"Jokero" was first performed in Istanbul in December 2005 at the end of a presentation about an interior design collection, when the group decided to "test" the audience's reaction to it. As part of "Romania's Day" in New York in May 2006, the group performed the song on Broadway. On the last night of their June 2006 Finnish tour, they performed the track in a disco. "Jokero" was one of the three songs that the group sang at Hity Na Czasie in July 2007, an event hosted by Polish radio station Radio Eska.

== Track listing ==
- Benelux digital download
1. "Jokero (Radio Edit)" – 3:40
2. "Jokero (Crush Remix)" – 4:33
3. "Jokero (Activ & Optick Extended Mix)" – 6:19
4. "Jokero (Cre8 Remix)" – 4:24
5. "Kylie (Crush Thunderdome Remix)" – 5:17
- Dutch CD single
1. "Jokero (Radio Version)" – 3:55
2. "Jokero (Crush Remix)" – 4:33
3. "Jokero (Activ & Optick Extended Mix)" – 6:19
4. "Jokero (Cre8 Remix)" – 4:23
5. "Kylie (Crush Thunderdome Remix)" – 5:16
- Digital download
1. "Jokero (Radio Edit)" – 4:02
2. "Jokero (Cre8 Remix)" – 4:24
3. "Jokero (Almud Remix)" – 5:17
4. "Jokero (Activ Optice Extended Mix)" – 6:19
5. "Jokero (Crush Remix)" – 4:33
- Finnish CD single
1. "Jokero (Radio Version)" – 3:55
2. "Jokero (Cre8 Remix)" – 4:23
3. "Jokero (Activ & Optick Extended Mix)" – 6:19

== Personnel ==
Credits adapted from the liner notes of French Kiss with Kylie.

- Akcent – lead vocals
- Georgiana – additional vocals
- Marius Nedelcu – songwriter
- Adrian Sînă – producer
- Adi Colceru – producer, mixing

== Charts ==
=== Weekly charts ===
Weekly chart performance for "Jokero"
Chart (2006)	Peak position
CIS Airplay (TopHit)	6
Netherlands (Dutch Top 40)	18
Netherlands (Single Top 100)	27
Romania (Romanian Top 100)	1
Russia Airplay (TopHit)	8
Sweden (Sverigetopplistan)	7

=== Year-end charts ===
Year-end chart performance for "Jokero"
Chart (2006)	Position
CIS (TopHit)	47
Netherlands (Dutch Top 40)	95
Romania (Romanian Top 100)	6
Russia Airplay (TopHit)	21

=== Decade-end charts ===
Decade-end chart performance for "Jokero"
Chart (2000–2009)	Position
Russia Airplay (TopHit)	172

== Release history ==
Release dates and formats for "Jokero"
Region	Date	Format	Label	Ref.
Romania	17 December 2005	Radio airplay	N/A	
Belgium	15 May 2006	Digital download; streaming	Roton	
Luxembourg	15 May 2006	Digital download; streaming	Roton	
Netherlands	15 May 2006	Digital download; streaming	Roton	
Netherlands	15 June 2006	CD single	Digidance	
Various	5 July 2006	Digital download; streaming	Music Company Nordic	
Finland	2006	CD single	The Dance Division	

== See also ==
- List of music released by Romanian artists that has charted in major music markets
