= Victor Bologan =

Moldovan chess grandmaster (born 1971)

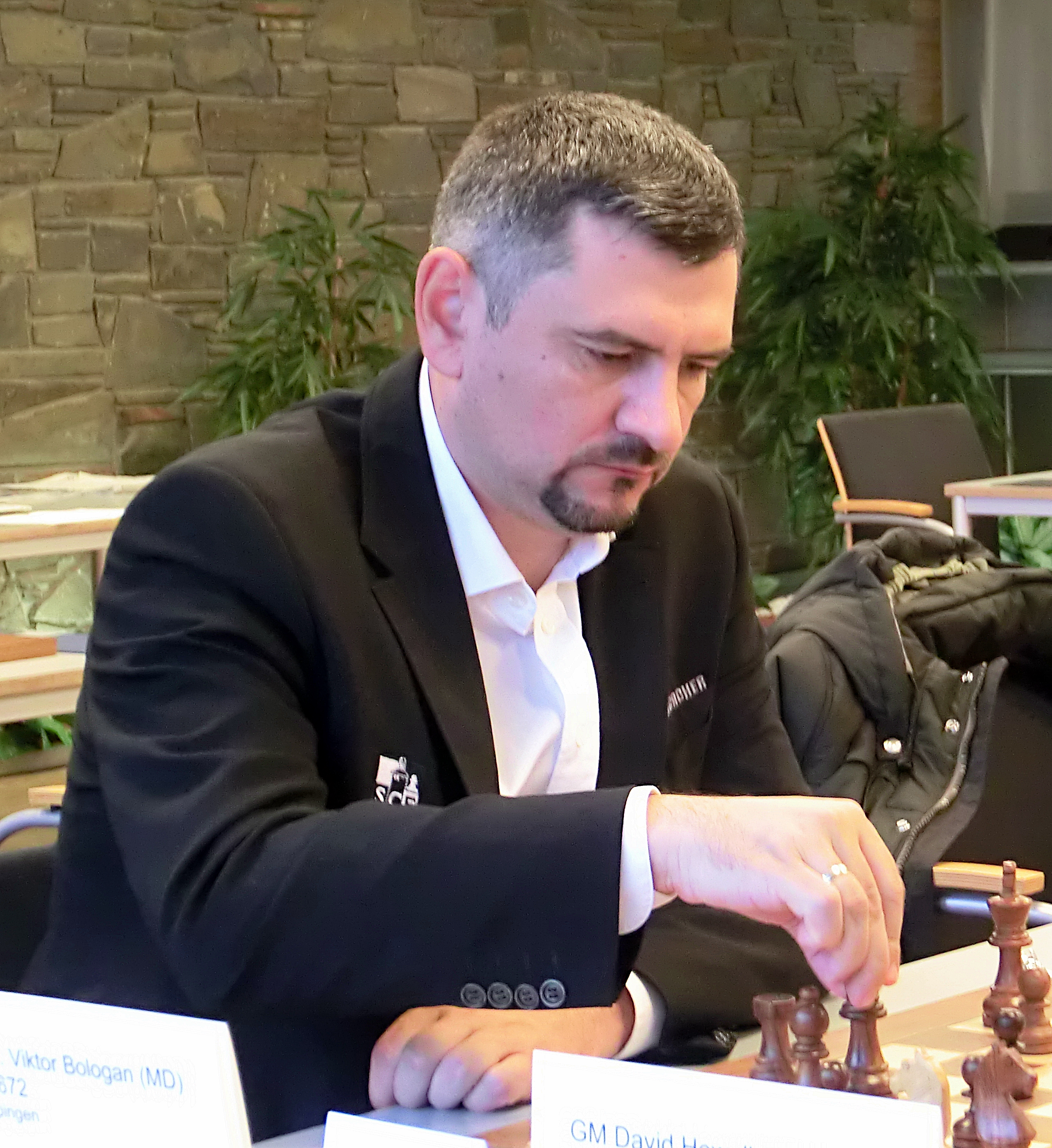
- Bologan in 2013

Personal information
- Born: 14 December 1971 (age 54) Chişinău, Moldavian SSR, Soviet Union

Chess career
- Country: Soviet Union (until 1991); Moldova (since 1992)
- Title: Grandmaster (1991)
- FIDE rating: 2590 (October 2026)
- Peak rating: 2734 (August 2012)
- Peak ranking: No. 18 (April 2005)

Victor (Viorel) Bologan (born 14 December 1971) is a Moldovan chess player and author. He was awarded the title of Grandmaster by FIDE in 1991.

== Career ==
Bologan won the first two editions of the Poikovsky Karpov International Tournament, in 2000 and 2001. He tied for first in the same tournament in 2005 and 2015. In 2003 he won the Aeroflot Open and the Dortmund Sparkassen Chess Meeting ahead of some of the world's top players.

He won the 2005 Canadian Open Chess Championship. Bologan tied for first place in the 2006 Aeroflot Open, finishing second on tiebreak. In May 2010, he tied for first with Wang Hao and Zahar Efimenko at the Bosna International open in Sarajevo.

Bologan played for Moldova in the Chess Olympiad in 1992 - 1998 and 2002 - 2014.

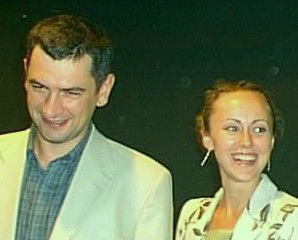
Bologan with his wife at Dortmund 2003

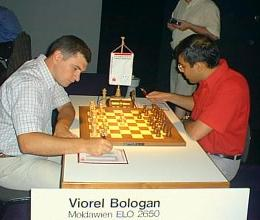
Bologan–Anand, Dortmund 2003

== Education ==
Bologan graduated from the Moscow Physical Culture and Sports Institute in 1993. In 1996, he successfully defended a doctoral thesis on the structure of preparation of high level chess players at the Russian State University of Physical Education, Sport, Youth and Tourism.

== Personal life ==
He is married to Margarita Bologan with whom he has three children. Bologan is currently living in Doha, Qatar.

== Books ==
- Bologan, Victor (2007). Victor Bologan. Selected Games 1985–2004. Russell Enterprises Inc. ISBN 978-1-888690-37-8
- Bologan, Victor (2008). The Chebanenko Slav According to Bologan. New In Chess. ISBN 978-90-5691-246-8.
- Bologan, Victor (2009). The King's Indian According to Bologan. A Complete Black Repertoire. Chess Stars. ISBN 978-954-8782-71-5.
- Bologan, Victor (2011). The Rossolimo Sicilian. New In Chess. ISBN 978-90-5691-345-8.
- Bologan, Victor (2012). The Powerful Catalan. A Complete Repertoire for White. New In Chess. ISBN 978-90-5691-401-1.
- Bologan, Victor (2014). Bologan's Black Weapons in the Open Games. How to Play for a Win if White Avoids the Ruy Lopez. New In Chess. ISBN 9056915436.
- Bologan, Victor (2015). Bologan's Ruy Lopez for Black. How to Play for a Win against the Spanish Opening. New In Chess. ISBN 978-90-5691-607-7
- Bologan, Victor (2017). Bologan's King's Indian. A Modern Reportoire for Black. New In Chess. ISBN 978-9056917203
- Bologan, Victor (2018). Bologan's Caro-Kann. A Modern Repertoire for Black. New In Chess. ISBN 978-9056917784

== ChessBase Fritztrainer opening DVDs ==
- Bologan, Viktor (2009). The King's Indian. Fritztrainer opening DVD, ChessBase. ISBN 978-3-86681-139-3.
- Bologan, Viktor (2009). The Caro–Kann. Fritztrainer opening DVD, ChessBase. ISBN 978-3-86681-131-7.
- Bologan, Viktor (2010). The Sicilian Rossolimo for White. Fritztrainer opening DVD, ChessBase.
- Bologan, Viktor (2010). The Fighting Philidor. Fritztrainer opening DVD, ChessBase.
- Bologan, Viktor (2011). Beating the Sicilian: Grandmaster Bologan's Repertoire Vol. 1, 2 and 3. Fritztrainer opening DVD, ChessBase.
- Bologan, Viktor. The Catalan: A complete repertoire for White! Fritztrainer opening DVD, ChessBase.
- Bologan, Viktor. Fit for the French. Fritztrainer opening DVD, ChessBase.
