= Kylie (song) =

- One of the various covers used to commercialize "Kylie".

Single by Akcent

from the album S.O.S.
- Released: 28 January 2005 ("Dragoste de închiriat"); 13 June 2005 ("Kylie")
- Studio: Win Production
- Genre: Dance
- Length: 4:06
- Label: Music Company Nordic
- Songwriters: Sebastian Barac; Radu Bolfea; Marcel Botezan; Marius Nedelcu; Adrian Sînă; Viorel Şipoş
- Producers: Sebastian Barac; Radu Bolfea; Marcel Botezan; Viorel Şipoş

Akcent singles chronology
"Spune-mi (Hey Baby)" (2004)	"Kylie" (2005)	"Jokero" (2005)

Music video
- "Kylie" on YouTube

"Kylie" is a song by Romanian group Akcent from their fourth studio album, S.O.S. (2005). It was written by two of the group's members, Adrian Sînă and Marius Nedelcu, alongside its producers Sebastian Barac, Radu Bolfea, Marcel Botezan and Viorel Şipoş. The track was initially released as "Dragoste de închiriat" (Romanian: "Love for Rent") on 28 January 2005, before being re-released in June in English under its current title. "Kylie" is a dance track which describes the group's fondness of Australian singer Kylie Minogue.

Reception towards the group's association with Minogue was mixed, two reviewers were critical of it, while one considered that it made the group stand out. Nevertheless, "Dragoste de închiriat" reached number two in Romania, while "Kylie" entered the charts in several European countries, including Denmark, Finland, Sweden, and the Netherlands. A music video, directed by Iulian Moga, premiered on MTV in April 2005. It depicts the group's members engaging in suggestive actions with one woman separately. The group performed both versions of the song on various occasions.

== Background and release ==
Adrian Sînă founded Akcent in February 1999 originally as a duo, alongside Ramona Barta. In 2000, the duo released their debut album, Senzatzia, with "Ultima vară" as the lead single. Although the single received major radio airplay, the two parted ways in 2001. Subsequently, in the same year, Sînă invited Sorin Brotnei, Mihai Gruia and Marius Nedelcu to repurpose Akcent as a four piece group. The lead single off their second studio album, "Ți-am promis", peaked at number five on the Romanian Top 100. Their second album, În culori, was released in January 2002, and received a platinum certification from the Uniunea Producătorilor de Fonograme din România later that year. "Prima iubire" served as the second single, reaching number two on the native chart. In 2003, the group released their third album, 100 bpm, with one of its singles, "Suflet pereche", peaking within the top 10 on the Romanian Top 100.

"Dragoste de închiriat" was released on 28 January 2005. In June of the same year, it was re-released in English as "Kylie" and was played for the first time under its new version on the Dutch radio station SLAM!. "Kylie" was released for digital download on 13 June in various countries by Music Company Nordic. On 28 January 2006 the track was added to American radio station's playlist at their discretion.

The song was written by Sebastian Barac, Radu Bolfea, Marcel Botezan, Marius Nedelcu, Adrian Sînă and Viorel Şipoş. Barac, Bolfea, Botezan and Şipoş produced and mixed the track, which was recorded at Win Production. The original version was released as the lead single from the group's fourth studio album S.O.S. (2005) while the English version was included on their fifth album, French Kiss with Kylie (2006). The dance track details the group's admiration towards Australian singer Kylie Minogue. Jaap Bartelds of Winq noted that the track begins with a sound similar to Minogue's "Spinning Around" (2000) and further references Minogue's single "I Should Be So Lucky" (1987) in the lyrics.

== Reception ==
Bartelds included the song in Winq's "Quirky Corner" which includes "nicely wrong" songs; songs which have a good sound but convey a bizarre message. Bartelds claimed that the track "quickly turns into a Balkan entry for the Eurovision Song Contest", and was critical of the reference to Minogue, stating "will that poor woman be spared nothing?". Jurnalul's Cătălina Iancu considered the group's association with Minogue to be a "cheap stunt". Conversely, Florin Grozea argued that the association made the group "stand out from the crowd" in the book Hit Yourself. 100 Ideas for a Successful Career in Music. Additionally, SLAM! called the track "[the] hit of the summer". Commercially, the song peaked at number two under its Romanian version for five weeks on Romanian Top 100. "Kylie" reached the top ten in Finland and the Netherlands, while also selling 5,000 first-day copies in the latter. It further reached number eighteen in both Denmark and Sweden, and the top thirty in Flanders and France.

== Music video ==
The music video was directed by Iulian Moga and it premiered on MTV in April 2005. The video begins with Sînă in a car with a woman next to him, being driven to a club. Upon their arrival, Akcent's other members are shown separately dancing among a group of women from the club. Sînă follows the woman with whom he arrived until she decides to go in a secluded room away from him, where she meets Gruia, then the two begin to undress each other. The woman is next seen with Nedelcu in another room arguing, before hopping on a pool table to take each other's clothes off. Thereafter, she is in a lift with Brotnei and as the lift crashes, they start making out. Interspersed shots of Sînă singing in the club are shown whenever the woman is engaging with a group member. The woman returns to Sînă in the car in which they arrived and the two start performing foreplay. Lastly, the video ends with Sînă leaving the car.

== Promotion ==
The group performed both versions of the song on several occasions. Their first performance of the Romanian version of it was in a club in Pitești on the day of the song's release. As part of Akcent's Finnish tour in June 2006, they performed "Kylie" in club Raatikellari. "Kylie" was one of the three tracks that the group sang at Hity Na Czasie, an event hosted by Polish radio station Radio Eska in July 2007. In December 2010, while performing in Pakistan, Akcent performed the song in Lahore. The song was reworked and released as a single by Dutch DJ Mike Williams alongside Dastic in 2019, and was featured on the former's setlist at Belgian music festival Tomorrowland. In July 2021, Sînă performed "Dragoste de închiriat" at Romanian radio station Kiss FM with Romanian singer Olivia Addams. In the same year, the song was performed at Polsat's New Year's Eve event.

== Track listing ==
- Digital download
1. "Kylie (Radio Edit)" – 4:09
2. "Kylie (Black Sea Remix)" – 4:36
3. "Kylie (DJ Win's Remix)" – 4:42
- Dutch CD single
1. "Kylie (Radio Edit)" – 4:09
2. "Kylie (Black Sea Remix)" – 4:36
3. "Kylie (DJ Win's Remix)" – 4:43
4. "Kylie (Very Long Orgasm Extended)" – 6:11
- Dutch twelve-inch single
1. "Kylie (Very Long Orgasm Extended)" – 6:11
2. "Kylie (Black Sea Remix)" – 4:36
3. "Kylie (DJ Win's Remix)" – 4:43
4. "Kylie (Original Radio Edit)" – 4:09
- Belgian enhanced CD
1. "Kylie (Original Radio Edit)" – 4:09
2. "Kylie (Black Sea Remix)" – 4:36
3. "Kylie Video" – 4:09
- US digital download
1. "Kylie (Original Radio Edit)" – 4:11
2. "Kylie (New Radio Edit)" – 3:36
3. "Kylie (Black Sea Remix)" – 4:38
4. "Kylie (DJ Win's Remix)" – 4:44
5. "Kylie (Very Long Orgasm Extended)" – 6:12
6. "Kylie (Instrumental)" – 4:06
- French CD single
1. "Kylie (Original F. Edit Mix)" – 3:32
2. "Kylie (Black Sea Remix)" – 4:33
- German CD single
1. "Kylie (Original Radio Edit)" – 4:09
2. "Kylie (Pulsedriver Remix)" – 5:07
- US CD single
1. "Kylie (New Radio Edit)" – 3:37
2. "Kylie (Very Long Orgasm – Extended)" – 6:14
3. "Kylie (Black Sea Remix)" – 4:38

== Personnel ==
Credits adapted from the liner notes of S.O.S. and French Kiss with Kylie.

- Akcent – lead vocals
- Adrian Sînă – songwriter
- Marius Nedelcu – songwriter
- Marcel Botezan – producer, songwriter, mixing
- Radu Bolfea – producer, songwriter, mixing
- Sebastian Barac – producer, songwriter, mixing
- Viorel Şipoş – producer, songwriter, mixing

== Charts ==
=== Weekly charts ===
Weekly chart performance for "Kylie"
Chart (2005–2006)	Peak position
Belgium (Ultratip Bubbling Under Wallonia)	15
Belgium (Ultratop 50 Flanders)	22
CIS Airplay (TopHit)	105
Denmark (Tracklisten)	18
Finland (Suomen virallinen lista)	8
France (SNEP)	21
Germany (GfK)	91
Netherlands (Dutch Top 40)	4
Netherlands (Single Top 100)	4
Romania Airplay (Romanian Top 100) "Dragoste de închiriat"	2
Sweden (Sverigetopplistan)	18

=== Year-end charts ===
Year-end chart performance for "Kylie"
Chart (2005)	Position
Netherlands (Dutch Top 40)	32
Netherlands (Dutch Top 100)	45
Romania (Romanian Top 100) "Dragoste de închiriat"	26
Russia Airplay (TopHit) Black Sea remix	29

=== Decade-end charts ===
Decade-end chart performance for "Kylie"
Chart (2000–2009)	Position
Russia Airplay (TopHit) Black Sea remix	179

== Release history ==
Release dates and formats for "Kylie"
Region	Date	Format	Label	Ref.
"Dragoste de închiriat" version
Romania	28 January 2005	N/A	N/A	
"Kylie" version
Various	13 June 2005	Digital download; streaming	Music Company Nordic	
Netherlands	15 July 2005	N/A	N/A	
Netherlands	18 July 2005	CD single	Digidance	
Netherlands	18 July 2005	Twelve-inch single	Digidance	
Belgium	13 September 2005	Enhanced CD	ARS Entertainment	
United States	8 November 2005	Digital download; streaming	Roton	
United States	24 January 2006	CD single	Ultra	
France	2005	CD single	ToCo International	
Germany	2005	CD single	Sony Music	

== Akcent, Sera and Misha Miller version ==
Romanian project Akcent (this time with only Adrian Sînă as a member) collaborated with Dutch singer Sera and Moldovan singer Misha Miller to release a 2025 re-make of the original song titled "Don't Leave (Kylie)".

=== Charts ===
==== Weekly charts ====
Weekly chart performance for "Don't Leave (Kylie)"
Chart (2025–2026)	Peak position
Belarus Airplay (TopHit)	1
CIS Airplay (TopHit)	3
Estonia Airplay (TopHit)	64
Finland Airplay (Radiosoittolista)	3
Hungary (Dance Top 40)	1
Hungary (Rádiós Top 40)	3
Kazakhstan Airplay (TopHit)	5
Moldova Airplay (TopHit)	1
Netherlands (Single Tip)	25
Poland Airplay (OLiS)	4
Romania Airplay (UPFR)	2
Romania Airplay (Media Forest)	1
Russia Airplay (TopHit)	1
Ukraine Airplay (TopHit)	1

==== Monthly charts ====
Monthly chart performance for "Don't Leave (Kylie)"
Chart (2025–2026)	Peak position
Belarus Airplay (TopHit)	1
CIS Airplay (TopHit)	5
Estonia Airplay (TopHit)	85
Kazakhstan Airplay (TopHit)	17
Moldova Airplay (TopHit)	1
Romania Airplay (TopHit)	3
Russia Airplay (TopHit)	4
Ukraine Airplay (TopHit)	1

=== Year-end charts ===
Year-end chart performance for "Don't Leave (Kylie)"
Chart (2025)	Position
Belarus Airplay (TopHit)	109
CIS Airplay (TopHit)	46
Hungary (Dance Top 40)	71
Hungary (Rádiós Top 40)	87
Moldova Airplay (TopHit)	49
Romania Airplay (TopHit)	27
Russia Airplay (TopHit)	63

== See also ==
- List of music released by Romanian artists that has charted in major music markets
