= Serhiy Dzyndzyruk =

Ukrainian boxer (born 1976)

Personal information
- Nickname: Dzyna ("Razor")
- Nationality: Ukrainian
- Born: Сергій Oлександрович Дзинзирук; 1 March 1976 (age 50) Nyzhnohirskyi, Ukrainian SSR, Soviet Union
- Height: 6 ft 0 in (183 cm)
- Weight: Light middleweight; Middleweight

Boxing career
- Reach: 68 in (173 cm)
- Stance: Southpaw

Boxing record
- Total fights: 40
- Wins: 37
- Win by KO: 24
- Losses: 2
- Draws: 1
Medal record
Representing Ukraine
Men's boxing
World Amateur Championships
Silver medal – second place	Budapest 1997	Welterweight
European Amateur Championships
Silver medal – second place	1998 Minsk	Welterweight
Bronze medal – third place	1996 Vejle	Welterweight

Serhiy Oleksandrovych Dzinziruk (Ukrainian: Сергій Дзиндзирук; born 1 March 1976) is a Ukrainian professional boxer and a former WBO super welterweight champion.

== Amateur ==
As an amateur he won a silver medal at the 1997 World Amateur Boxing Championships, losing in the final to Russia's Oleg Saitov. He also won silver in the European Championship in 1998. He won 195 out of 220 fights.

== Professional ==
His record is 37-1 (23 KOs). He won the WBO world junior middleweight champion title against Daniel Santos. After that bout, he defended his title six times. He used to fight out of Germany before moving to America and signing with promoters Gary Shaw and Artie Pelullo.

On May 14, 2010 on Showtime Championship Boxing, he faced Daniel Dawson in defense of his WBO World Junior Middleweight Championship. He defeated Dawson by TKO in the 10th round.

=== Dzinziruk vs Martinez ===
Dzinziruk moved up in weight to challenge the slick Argentinian boxer Sergio Martínez on March 12, 2011 at the Foxwoods Resort Casino, Mashantucket, Connecticut for the vacant WBC Diamond belt. Martinez dominated the fight, even out-jabbing Dzinziruk, and won by TKO in round 8 after knocking his opponent down 5 times in the fight. Prior to his fight with Martinez, Dzinziruk had never been knocked down in his professional and amateur careers.

On 5 October 2011, the WBO stripped Dzinziruk of the junior middleweight title due to inactivity, with his last title defence being his on May 14, 2010 against Daniel Dawson. This was because Dzinziruk had been battling a number of injuries, and after pulling out of his scheduled September 30 defence against Lukas Konecny, the interim WBO junior middleweight champion Zaurbek Baysangurov was promoted to the status of "full champion."

== Professional boxing record ==
40 fights	37 wins	2 losses
By knockout	24	2
By decision	12	0
By disqualification	1	0
Draws	1	

No.	Result	Record	Opponent	Type	Round, time	Date	Location	Notes
40	Loss	37–2–1	Brian Vera	TKO	10 (12), 1:50	Jan 25, 2013	Turning Stone Resort Casino, Verona, New York, US	For NABO middleweight title
39	Draw	37–1–1	Jonathan González	SD	12	Sep 1, 2012	Turning Stone Resort Casino, Verona, New York, US	
38	Loss	37–1	Sergio Martínez	TKO	8 (12), 1:43	Mar 12, 2011	MGM Grand at Foxwoods Resort, Mashantucket, Connecticut, US	For The Ring middleweight title
37	Win	37–0	Daniel Dawson	TKO	10 (12), 2:12	May 14, 2010	Chumash Casino Resort, Santa Ynez, California, US	Retained WBO light middleweight title
36	Win	36–0	Joel Julio	UD	12	Nov 1, 2008	Koenig Pilsener Arena, Oberhausen, Germany	Retained WBO light middleweight title
35	Win	35–0	Lukáš Konečný	MD	12	Apr 26, 2008	Freiberger Arena, Dresden, Germany	Retained WBO light middleweight title
34	Win	34–0	Carlos Nascimento	KO	11 (12), 1:42	May 19, 2007	Color Line Arena, Altona, Germany	Retained WBO light middleweight title
33	Win	33–0	Alisultan Nadirbegov	UD	12	Oct 21, 2006	Brandberge Arena, Halle an der Saale, Germany	Retained WBO light middleweight title
32	Win	32–0	Sebastián Luján	UD	12	May 27, 2006	Zenith Halle, Munich, Germany	Retained WBO light middleweight title
31	Win	31–0	Daniel Santos	UD	12	Dec 3, 2005	Bordelandhalle, Magdeburg, Germany	Won WBO light middleweight title
30	Win	30–0	Jimmy Colas	UD	12	Apr 16, 2005	Bordelandhalle, Magdeburg, Germany	Retained European light middleweight title
29	Win	29–0	Hussein Bayram	KO	11 (12), 2:08	Nov 6, 2004	Erdgas Arena, Riesa, Germany	Retained European light middleweight title
28	Win	28–0	Mamadou Thiam	TKO	3 (12)	Jul 17, 2004	Stadthalle, Zwickau, Germany	Won European light middleweight title
27	Win	27–0	Sylvestre Marianini	RTD	5 (6), 3:00	May 8, 2004	Arena Westfalenhalle, Dortmund, Germany	
26	Win	26–0	Andrey Pestryayev	TKO	5 (8)	Jan 31, 2004	Sport Palace, Kyiv, Ukraine	
25	Win	25–0	Dmitri Protkunas	TKO	3 (6)	Dec 13, 2003	Okraglak Halle, Opole, Poland	
24	Win	24–0	Ariel Gabriel Chaves	TKO	7 (12)	Oct 18, 2003	Color Line Arena, Altona, Germany	Retained WBO Inter-Continental light middleweight title
23	Win	23–0	Lóránt Szabó	TKO	2 (8)	Jul 5, 2003	Anhalt Arena, Dessau, Germany	
22	Win	22–0	Marcelo Alejandro Rodriguez	KO	2 (12)	May 10, 2003	Hanns-Martin-Schleyer-Halle, Stuttgart, Germany	Won WBO Inter-Continental light middleweight title
21	Win	21–0	Serge Vigne	TKO	4 (8)	Mar 8, 2003	Preussag Arena, Hannover, Germany	
20	Win	20–0	Cristian Voicu	DQ	4 (?)	Jul 27, 2002	Hala Milenium, Kolobrzeg, Poland	
19	Win	19–0	Nenad Stankovic	TKO	1 (6)	Nov 10, 2001	Wloclawek, Poland	
18	Win	18–0	Alexander Zhorzholiani	TKO	5 (8)	Aug 11, 2001	Jaworzno, Poland	
17	Win	17–0	Justice Ganiza	KO	3 (?)	Jun 15, 2001	Casino Bingo, Kyiv, Ukraine	
16	Win	16–0	Mihai Iorgu	KO	1 (?)	May 18, 2001	Warsaw, Poland	
15	Win	15–0	Yuri Tsarenka	SD	6	Apr 30, 2001	Circus, Kyiv, Ukraine	
14	Win	14–0	Ruslan Akhmedzanov	TKO	3 (8)	Mar 2, 2001	Warsaw, Poland	
13	Win	13–0	Mike Algoet	PTS	8	Feb 6, 2001	Baluan Sholak Sports Palace, Almaty, Kazakhstan	
12	Win	12–0	Joseph Freytag	TKO	2 (?)	Nov 3, 2000	Nowy Dwor, Poland	
11	Win	11–0	Jiri Sklenar	TKO	2 (?)	Oct 14, 2000	Debica, Poland	
10	Win	10–0	Rene Orlovsky	TKO	2 (?)	Sep 3, 2000	Poznan, Poland	
9	Win	9–0	Quandray Robertson	KO	4 (?)	Jun 10, 2000	Elblag, Poland	
8	Win	8–0	Benji Singleton	PTS	8	Mar 25, 2000	Bialystok, Poland	
7	Win	7–0	Leigh Wicks	TKO	2 (6), 2:24	Feb 21, 2000	Elephant & Castle Centre, London, England, UK	
6	Win	6–0	Leon Pearson	PTS	6	Dec 10, 1999	Warsaw, Poland	
5	Win	5–0	Ramdane Kaouane	PTS	4	Oct 22, 1999	Legia na Bemowie Hall, Warsaw, Poland	
4	Win	4–0	Pedro Thompson	RTD	2 (6)	Sep 20, 1999	Moat House, Peterborough, Cambridgeshire, England, UK	
3	Win	3–0	David Baptiste	RTD	2 (4)	Apr 29, 1999	York Hall, London, England, UK	
2	Win	2–0	Delroy Mellis	TKO	3 (4), 1:29	Feb 4, 1999	Concert Theatre, London, England, UK	
1	Win	1–0	Ramdane Kaouane	PTS	4	Jan 22, 1999	Warsaw, Poland	

== See also ==
- List of world light-middleweight boxing champions

Sporting positions
Regional boxing titles
Vacant Title last held by Roman Karmazin	EBU Super-welterweight champion July 17, 2004 – 2005; Vacated	Vacant Title next held by Michele Piccirillo
World boxing titles
Preceded by Daniel Santos	WBO Light middleweight champion December 3, 2005 – October 5, 2011; Stripped	Succeeded by Zaurbek Baysangurov; Interim Champion promoted
