= Sera (singer) =

Dutch singer (born 1994)

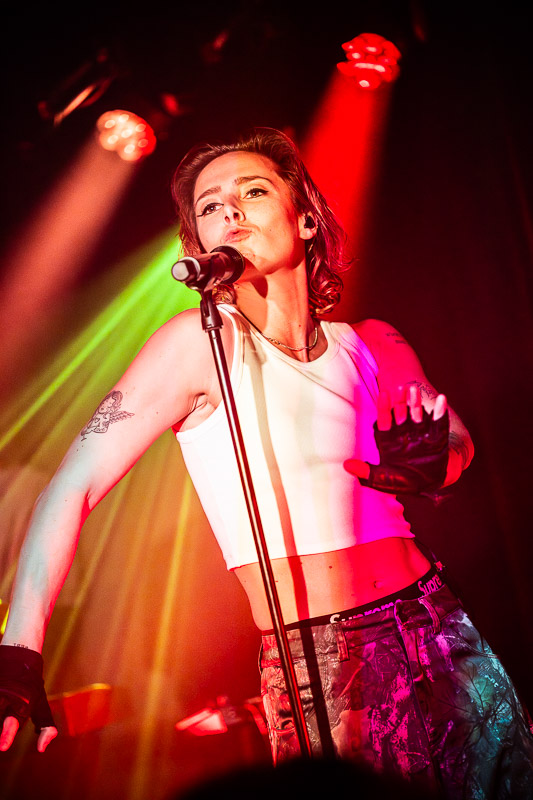
- Sera performing in 2025

Background information
- Born: Sera de Bruin; 11 May 1994 (age 32); Sliedrecht, Netherlands
- Genres: Pop
- Occupation: Singer
- Label: Universal Music
- Website: sera-music.com

Sera de Bruin (born 11 May 1994), known simply as Sera, is a Dutch singer from Sliedrecht.

== Early life ==
De Bruin was born to a Dutch mother and a father of Turkish descent. She has a brother and sister. Her father died unexpectedly when she was twelve.

== Career ==
De Bruin became famous for videos on Instagram and TikTok in which she covers songs by other artists in her car. Her video in which she sang "Dance Monkey" by Tones and I achieved millions of views.

Her videos came to the attention of, among others, Georgina Rodriguez, the partner of Cristiano Ronaldo, who invited her to perform at the footballer's birthday. Justin Bieber also discovered her and asked her to participate during a session on Instagram live. They sang a duet there. As a result, De Bruin was also asked to perform on radio and television, including at De Wereld Draait Door.

De Bruin signed with the record label Universal Music. Her debut single, "Only Us", was released in July 2021. She participated in the television programme Beste Zangers in 2024. In 2024, her song "Head Held High" reached number 1870 in the Top 2000.

== Discography ==
=== Singles ===
Title	Year	Peak chart positions			Album
Title	Year	NLD (40)	NLD (100)	BEL (FL)	Album
"Only Us"	2021	28	68	—	The Journey
"Take a Chance"	2021	30	95	—	The Journey
"Head Held High"	2022	9	36	—	The Journey
"Best Friend"	2023	36	—	—	The Journey
"Stay (Never Leave)" (with Kris Kross Amsterdam and Conor Maynard)	2023	3	17	24	The Journey
"I Can't Be the Only One" (with YouNotUs)	2023	27	—	—	Non-album single
"Hurt Me"	2024	31	—	—	The Journey
"Could Have Been Us" (with Douwe Bob)	2024	28	—	—	Non-album singles
"Don't Leave (Kylie)" (with Akcent and Misha Miller)	2025	—	—	—	Non-album singles
