= Akcent =

Romanian dance pop act

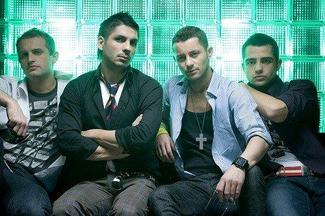
- Akcent, in Bucharest, Romania, 2007

Background information
- Origin: Bucharest, Romania
- Genre: Dance-pop
- Years active: 1999–present
- Label: Roton
- Members: Adrian Sînă
- Past members: Ramona Barta; Marius Nedelcu; Corneliu Ulici; Mihai Gruia; Sorin Brotnei

Akcent (Romanian pronunciation: [akˈt͡ʃent]) is a Romanian dance pop group whose members sing in Romanian, English and Spanish. Their name originated as a wordplay on accent. Originally a duo, it consisted of Adrian Sînă and Ramona Barta. They released their debut album Senzatzia in 2000. Except for the first track, "Ultima vara", which received some airplay, the album was a commercial failure and the duo disbanded shortly after. Sînă brought Marius Nedelcu, Mihai Gruia and Sorin Brotnei into the group, changing it from a duo to a boyband in 2001. They came to prominence with the single "Ți-am promis" in their native Romania.

Their single "Kylie" was commercially successful in Europe. In 2006, they attempted to represent Romania at the Eurovision Song Contest with the single "Jokero", in collaboration with Romanian singer Nico. It became their first number-one single on the Romanian Top 100. Due to several conflicts, Sînă became the sole member of the project in 2013.

== History ==
=== Early years ===
Akcent is a Romanian dance-pop group known for performing in Romanian, English, and Spanish. The group's name is a wordplay on "accent." Initially formed as a duo in 1999 by Adrian Sînă and Ramona Barta, Akcent released its debut album, Senzatzia, in 2000. Despite some airplay for the single "Ultima vară," the album did not achieve commercial success, leading to the duo's disbandment.

In 2001, Sînă restructured Akcent as a boy band by bringing in Marius Nedelcu, Mihai Gruia, and Sorin Brotnei. The group gained widespread recognition in Romania with the release of the single "Ți-am promis." They later achieved international success with the song "Kylie," which performed well across Europe.

In 2006, Akcent competed in Romania’s national selection for the Eurovision Song Contest with the song "Jokero," a collaboration with Romanian singer Nico. The song became their first number-one hit on the Romanian Top 100.

Following internal conflicts, Sînă became the sole remaining member of Akcent in 2013, continuing the project as a solo act.

=== Continued success ===
In 2003, the band released their third studio album, 100 BPM. Its title refers to the intensity of a heartbeat during a kiss. It included their number-one single "Buchet de trandafiri" ("Bouquet of roses"). Their fourth album, Poveste de viata (Life story), was also a huge success for the band. It included hits like "Spune-mi (Hey baby!)" ["Tell me (Hey baby!)"]. They reached the peak of their success with the release of their studio album S.O.S. and its lead single "Dragoste de inchiriat" ("Love for rent"). It became their signature song and hit number one in Romania, both digitally and in airplay. Due to its success, the song was rewritten in English and released to the international market as "Kylie" (an ode to Kylie Minogue). It became a radio hit in countries like Turkey, the Netherlands, Belgium, France, Greece, and Ukraine. Akcent's debut English album, French Kiss with Kylie, was released in Europe on August 23, 2006, and it included their two hit singles, "Kylie" and "Jokero."

In April 2008, Marius Nedelcu left the band to go solo. The remaining three members called in Corneliu Ulici, a former member of another Romanian group, Bliss. However, Corneliu did not want to make music his career and left after only five months, after which Akcent officially became a trio. Adrian Sînă was commissioned to produce Akcent's album Fără lacrimi (No Tears). The international hit singles "That's My Name," "Stay with Me," and "Lover's Cry" were all produced by Sînă. In 2009, he also produced the True Believers album, which has been one of Akcent's most successful to date. The album included the hits "That's My Name," "Stay with Me," "Lover's Cry," and "Tears." In the same year, Akcent won the Balkan Music Award for "Best Duet or Group." Because of the success of "That's My Name," the song, along with "Stay with Me," was released through U.S. record label Ultra Records and Warner Music Group in Scandinavia, Turkey, Italy, Greece, and other countries. The single was also included on the Just Dance: Vol 3 compilation album released by The Island Def Jam Music Group in 2010. After this multi-platinum album, the band started performing worldwide.

=== The new decade ===
In 2011, Akcent signed a recording contract with Robbins Entertainment, and in May 2012, "My Passion" was officially released in the United States. Then came the song "Feelings on Fire," which featured Ruxandra Bar and a music video that was filmed with the band members driving sports cars in Romania, on Transfagarasan. Sînă also became a judge of X Factor the same year. 2012 was a busy and successful year for Akcent with touring and more hits. In January, the group released the single "I'm Sorry" featuring pop singer Sandra N. The single was later licensed to Disco Wax Records and distributed by Sony Music Entertainment in the United Kingdom, Finland, and Denmark. Several of Akcent's singles have been added to dance compilations and/or released singularly off of different major recording labels, including Warner Music Group, Universal Music Group, and Ministry of Sound.

In the northern-hemisphere summer of 2012, Akcent released the single "Chimie Intre Noi" ("Chemistry between us"), produced by Sînă. In September 2012, the group embarked on a U.S. tour, performing sold-out shows in New York City, New York, and Chicago, Illinois. Akcent signed with Shakir Entertainment Management in New York City on November 26, 2012. As of December 2012, the group's music videos and songs on YouTube had been viewed close to 1 billion times, and they had more than 3 million fans on Facebook. Akcent is the only international pop act to perform live in Pakistan several times within the past two years.

=== 2013–2014: Disbandment and lasting success ===
In September 2013, the band split after a quarrel, leaving Sînă as the only member of the band.

As of September 2013, Adrian Sînă was the only male artist with the most chart entries on the Romanian Top 100. Overall, only artists like Madonna or Rihanna had more entries than him. In 2014, he saw immense success with the songs "Kamelia" and "Faina."In 2015, he released the successful singles "Te Quiero" ft. Galena and "Amor Gitana" ft. Sandra N. In 2016, he released the album Love the Show. He has remained loyal to the original style of Akcent. Meanwhile, Sorin Brotnei and Gruia Mihai started their own band, "Two."

== Discography ==
=== Albums ===
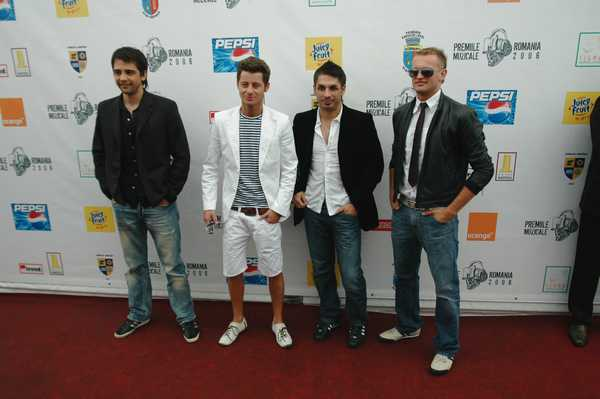
Akcent in 2006

List of studio albums, with selected chart positions, sales and certifications
Title	Album details	Peak chart positions	Sales	Certifications
Title	Album details	SWE	Sales	Certifications
Senzatzia	Released: 2000; Label: Roton; Format: CD, digital download, streaming	—		
În culori	Released: 2002; Label: Roton; Format: CD, digital download, streaming	—	ROM: 150,000 (Note: Sales of În culori in Romania as of June 2007.)	UPFR: Platinum
100 bpm	Released: 14 May 2003; Label: Roton; Format: CD, digital download, cassette, streaming	—		
S.O.S.	Released: 30 April 2005; Label: Roton; Format: CD, digital download, cassette, streaming	—	ROM: 35,000 (Note: Sales of S.O.S. in Romania as of December 2005.)	UPFR: Gold
French Kiss with Kylie	Released: 6 July 2007; Label: Magic; Format: CD, digital download, streaming	37		
King of Disco	Released: January 2007; Label: Roton; Format: CD, digital download, cassette, streaming	—		
Fără lacrimi	Released: 2 February 2009; Label: Roton; Format: CD, digital download, streaming	—		
True Believers	Released: 18 September 2009; Label: Magic; Format: CD, digital download, streaming	—		
Love the Show	Released: 1 April 2016; Label: Roton; Format: Digital download, streaming	—		
"—" denotes a release that did not chart or was not released in that territory.

=== Extended plays ===
List of extended plays
Title	Extended play details
Poveste de viaţă	Released: 4 May 2004; Label: Roton; Format: CD, digital download, cassette, streaming
Around the World	Released: 21 March 2014; Label: Roton; Format: Digital download, streaming

=== Compilations ===
List of compilations
Title	Compilation details
Primul capitol	Released: 2006; Label: Roton; Format: CD, digital download, cassette, streaming
Luchshiye Khity (Лучшие Хиты)	Released: 21 October 2014 (Note: Russia-only release.); Label: RDS; Format: Digital download, streaming
Diamentowa Kolekcja Disco: Faina	Released: 7 April 2015 (Note: Poland-only release.); Label: Magic; Format: CD, digital download, streaming
Akcent 20	Released: 1 February 2019; Label: Roton; Format: CD, digital download, streaming
The Greatest Hits of Akcent	Released: 11 June 2021 (Note: Asia-only release.); Label: EQ Music; Format: CD, digital download, streaming

=== Singles ===
List of singles, with selected chart positions
Title	Year	Peak chart positions										Album
Title	Year	ROM (Note: Notes concerning the Romanian peaks: Due to the lack of national chart Romanian Top 100 archives for the late 2000s, the airplay charts published at that time by Nielsen Music Control and Uniunea Producătorilor de Fonograme din România (UPFR) are taken into consideration for "Stay with Me", "That's My Name" and "My Passion". It is unknown whether the two were affiliated with the Romanian Top 100, however their charts are reliable.; Airplay 100 replaced the Romanian Top 100 in 2012 after the latter chart ceased its weekly issuing.)	BUL	CIS	DEN	FRA	GER	GRE	NLD	SWE	TUR	Album
"Ultima vară"	2000	—	—	—	—	—	—	—	—	—	—	Senzatzia
"Ți-am promis"	2001	5	—	—	—	—	—	—	—	—	—	În culori
"Prima iubire"	2002	2	—	—	—	—	—	—	—	—	—	În culori
"În culori"	2002	17	—	—	—	—	—	—	—	—	—	În culori
"Buchet de trandafiri"	2003	13	—	—	—	—	—	—	—	—	—	100 bpm
"Suflet pereche"	2003	8	—	—	—	—	—	—	—	—	—	100 bpm
"Poveste de viață"	2004	23	—	—	—	—	—	—	—	—	—	Poveste de viață
"Spune-mi (Hey Baby)"	2004	56	—	—	—	—	—	—	—	—	—	Poveste de viață
"Kylie" (Note: "Kylie" is the English version of "Dragoste de închiriat".)	2005	2	—	105	18	21	91	—	4	18	—	S.O.S. / French Kiss with Kylie
"Jokero"	2006	1	—	6	—	—	—	—	27	7	—	S.O.S.
"French Kiss"	2006	2	—	108	—	—	—	—	—	—	—	S.O.S.
"King of Disco"	2007	7	—	75	—	—	—	—	—	—	—	King of Disco
"Let's Talk About It"	2007	51	—	114	—	—	—	—	—	—	—	King of Disco
"Umbrela ta"	2008	—	—	—	—	—	—	—	—	—	—	Fără lacrimi
"Stay with Me"	2009	1	6	7	—	—	—	—	—	—	—	Fără lacrimi / True Believers
"That's My Name"	2009	5	3	73	—	—	—	1	—	—	—	Fără lacrimi / True Believers
"How Deep Is Your Love"	2009	—	—	—	—	—	—	—	—	—	—	Non-album singles
"Too Late to Cry" (Vivien O'Hara featuring Akcent)	2009	—	—	27	—	—	—	—	—	—	—	Non-album singles
"Love Stoned"	2010	27	—	124	—	—	—	—	—	—	—	Non-album singles
"My Passion"	2010	5	—	28	—	—	—	—	—	—	2	Non-album singles
"Feelings on Fire" (featuring Ruxandra Bar)	2011	71	—	—	—	—	—	—	—	—	—	Non-album singles
"Angel"	2011	—	—	—	—	—	—	—	—	—	—	Non-album singles
"I'm Sorry" (feat. Sandra N.)	2012	12	—	—	—	—	—	—	—	—	—	Non-album singles
"Back to Me"	2012	—	—	—	—	—	—	—	—	—	—	Non-album singles
"Chimie între noi"	2012	—	—	—	—	—	—	—	—	—	—	Non-album singles
"Arde ceva"	2013	—	—	—	—	—	—	—	—	—	—	Non-album singles
"Boracay" (featuring Sandra N.)	2013	—	5	176	—	—	—	—	—	—	1	Non-album singles
"Lacrimi curg"	2013	—	—	—	—	—	—	—	—	—	—	Non-album singles
"Kamelia" (featuring Lidia Buble and DDY Tunes)	2014	10	—	—	—	—	—	—	—	—	1	Around the World
"Faina"	2014	—	—	—	—	—	—	—	—	—	12	Around the World
"Dilemma"	2015	61	—	—	—	—	—	—	—	—	—	Love the Show
"Te Quiero"	2015	—	—	—	—	—	—	—	—	—	12	Love the Show
"Amor Gitana" (featuring Sandra N.)	2015	59	—	168	—	—	—	—	—	—	—	Love the Show
"Push" (featuring Amira)	2016	—	—	—	—	—	—	—	—	—	—	Love the Show
"Lost in Love"	2020	—	—	—	—	—	—	—	—	—	—	TBA
"You Don't Know My Love"	2021	—	—	—	—	—	—	—	—	—	—	TBA
"Heart Attack" (with Olivia Addams)	2021	—	—	—	—	—	—	—	—	—	—	TBA
"Miracle of Love"	2024	—	—	—	—	—	—	—	—	—	—	TBA
"Don't Leave (Kylie)(featuring SERA and Misha Miller)	2025	1	—	4	—	—	—	—	(Note: "Don't Leave (Kylie)" did not chart on the Dutch Single Top 100, but reached number 25 on the Dutch Single Tip chart.)	—	—	TBA
"—" denotes a release that did not chart or was not released in that territory.

=== Other charted songs ===
List of other charted songs
Title	Year	Peak chart positions	Album
Title	Year	ROM	Album
"Cel mai dulce cadou"	2002	21	În culori

== See also ==
- List of music released by Romanian artists that has charted in major music markets
