= Tue Bjørn Thomsen =

Danish boxer

Medal record

Representing Denmark

Men's boxing

World Amateur Championships
| Bronze medal – third place | Budapest 1997 | Heavyweight |

Tue Bjørn Thomsen (December 21, 1972 – April 23, 2006) was a professional boxer from Denmark, whose best performance as an amateur was winning the bronze medal at the 1997 World Amateur Boxing Championships in Budapest, Hungary. Born in Egedesminde, Greenland to family of Danish and Icelandic heritage, he made his professional debut in late 1997. On March 31, 2000 he won the vacant IBC Super Cruiserweight Title by defeating Nate Miller of the United States, in the Esbjerg Stadionhal in Esbjerg, Denmark. On April 23, 2006, Thomsen was knifed to death during a bar fight in central Copenhagen.

== Professional boxing record ==
22 Wins (9 knockouts, 13 decisions), 1 Loss (1 knockout), 1 Draw Archived December 30, 2014, at the Wayback Machine
| Result | Record | Opponent | Type | Round | Date | Location | Notes |
| Draw | 10-7 | (Brazil) Carlos Eduardo Balduino de Melo | TD | 1 | 25/10/2002 | (Denmark) Esbjerg Stadionhal, Esbjerg | |
| Win | 39-3 | (United States) Rob Calloway | UD | 12 | 21/09/2001 | (Denmark) Idraettens hus, Vejle | IBC World Super Cruiserweight Title. 118-112, 116-113, 115-114. |
| Win | 7-29-3 | (United States) Bradley Rone | UD | 6 | 16/06/2001 | (Denmark) Brøndby Hall, Brøndby | 60-54, 60-53, 60-54. |
| Win | 5-2 | (United States) Curtis McDorman | TKO | 5 | 27/04/2001 | (Denmark) Aalborg Hallen, Aalborg | |
| Loss | 19-6-1 | (South Africa) Jacob Mofokeng | KO | 4 | 26/05/2000 | (Denmark) Holbaek Stadionhal, Holbaek | |
| Win | 31-7 | (United States) Nate Miller | TD | 10 | 31/03/2000 | (Denmark) Esbjerg Stadionhal, Esbjerg | IBC World Super Cruiserweight Title. 100-91, 99-92, 100-90. |
| Win | 33-22-2 | (Mexico) Mike Sedillo | KO | 4 | 18/02/2000 | (Denmark) Aalborg Hallen, Aalborg | Sedillo knocked out at 2:10 of the fourth round. |
| Win | 18-5 | (Argentina) Pedro Daniel Franco | UD | 8 | 26/11/1999 | Viborg Stadionhal, Viborg, Denmark | 80-72, 80-72, 80-72. |
| Win | 12-1 | (United States) Mark L. Bradley | KO | 2 | 29/10/1999 | (Denmark) K.B. Hallen, Copenhagen | |
| Win | 26-1 | (United States) Joey Guy | PTS | 6 | 01/10/1999 | (Denmark) Randers Hallen, Randers | |
| Win | 14-16 | (United States) Cleveland Woods | UD | 6 | 03/09/1999 | (Denmark) K.B. Hallen, Copenhagen | 60-54, 60-54, 60-55. |
| Win | 16-1-1 | (Denmark) Mark Hulstrom | UD | 8 | 18/06/1999 | (Denmark) Idraettens hus, Vejle | Danish Heavyweight Title. 78-75, 79-73, 80-74. |
| Win | 31-14 | (United States) Tony LaRosa | PTS | 6 | 04/05/1999 | (Denmark) Cirkusbygningen, Copenhagen | |
| Win | 18-20-1 | (United States) Tim "Scrap Iron" Johnson | KO | 1 | 16/04/1999 | (Denmark) K.B. Hallen, Copenhagen | |
| Win | 6-2-1 | (Dominican Republic) Marcial Vinicio | PTS | 6 | 19/03/1999 | (Denmark) Falconer Centret, Copenhagen | |
| Win | 15-26-1 | (United States) Kimmuel Odum | TKO | 1 | 27/11/1998 | (Denmark) Vejby-Risskov Hallen, Aarhus | |
| Win | 43-13-1 | (United States) Iran Barkley | UD | 6 | 06/11/1998 | (Denmark) K.B. Hallen, Copenhagen | 58-55, 58-55, 58-55. |
| Win | 3-1 | (United States) Rodney Phillips | KO | 1 | 16/10/1998 | (Denmark) Aalborg Hallen, Aalborg | |
| Win | 23-2 | (United States) Damon Reed | UD | 4 | 04/09/1998 | (Denmark) Kolding-Hallen, Kolding | 40-35, 40-35, 40-35. |
| Win | 13-4-1 | (United States) Mike Pearman | TKO | 4 | 05/06/1998 | (Denmark) K.B. Hallen, Copenhagen | |
| Win | 4-0 | (United States) Steve Kondas | TKO | 2 | 01/05/1998 | (Denmark) Kolding Teater, Kolding | |
| Win | 2-0 | (United States) Lanardo Peoples | UD | 4 | 03/04/1998 | (Denmark) Holbaek Stadionhal, Holbaek | 40-34, 40-35, 40-32. |
| Win | 10-7-1 | (United States) Jimmy Haynes | KO | 1 | 20/03/1998 | (Denmark) Vejby-Risskov Hallen, Aarhus | |
| Win | 3-5-1 | (United States) Aljenon DeBose | PTS | 4 | 05/12/1997 | (Denmark) Aalborg Hallen, Aalborg | |
