= Lukáš Konečný =

Czech boxer

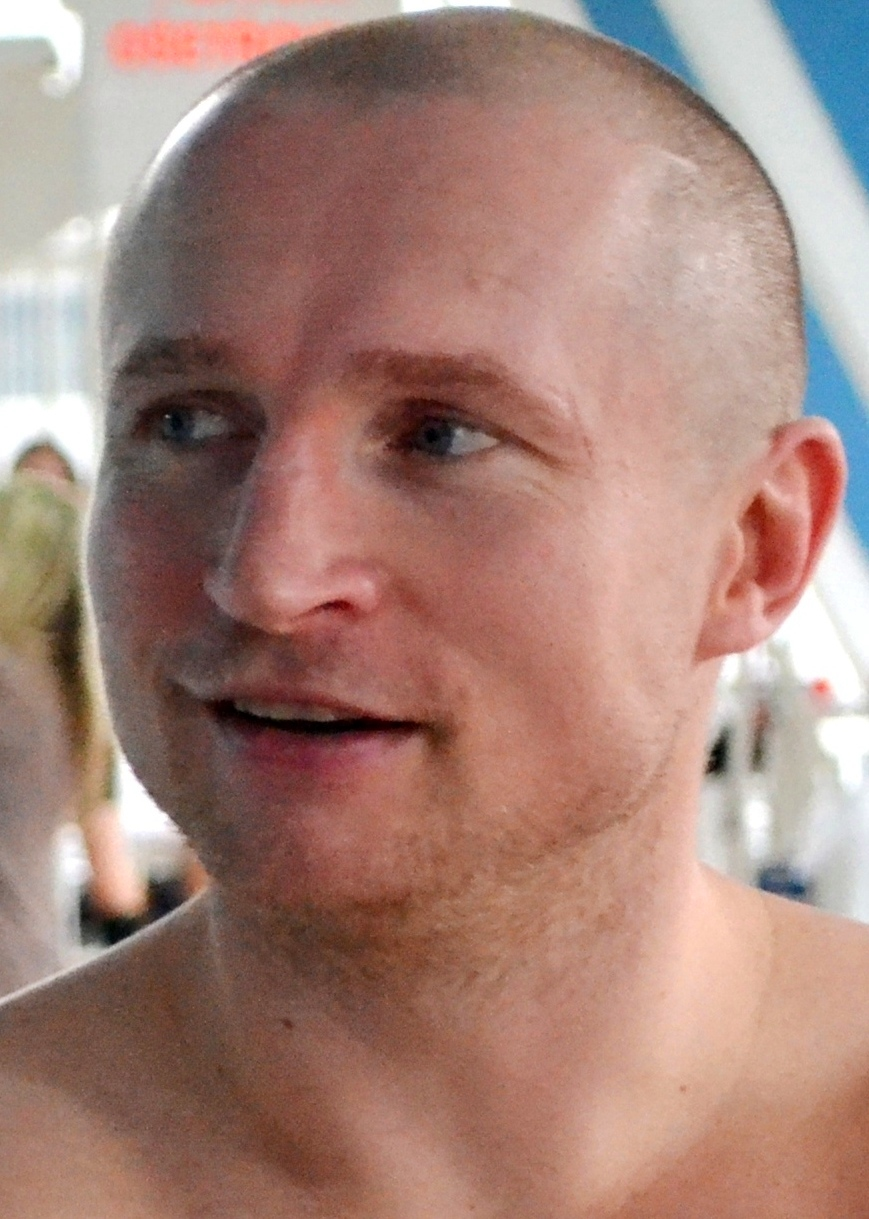
- Konečný in 2015

Personal information
- Nationality: Czech
- Born: 19 July 1978 (age 48) Brno, Czechoslovakia (now Czech Republic)
- Height: 1.73 m (5 ft 8 in)
- Weight: Light-middleweight; Middleweight

Boxing career
- Reach: 178 cm (70 in)
- Stance: Orthodox

Boxing record
- Total fights: 57
- Wins: 52
- Win by KO: 24
- Losses: 5
Medal record
Representing Czech Republic
Men's boxing
World Amateur Championships
Bronze medal – third place	Budapest 1997	Light Welterweight
Bronze medal – third place	Houston 1999	Light Welterweight

Lukáš Konečný (born 19 July 1978) is a Czech former professional boxer. He held the WBO interim, European and European Union light-middleweight titles, and challenged for a middleweight world title in his final fight. Konečný is widely considered to be the most successful boxer from the Czech Republic.

== Amateur career ==
He fought his first match when he was 14 years old, following this with numerous wins in several foreign tournaments and the Ústí nad Labem Grand Prix. He took part in the Czech Republic Championship four times as a junior and five times as a senior. He was second in the European Juniors Championship in Sifoku in 1995 but one year later he lost in Havana where he came sixth. He won the bronze medal in the World Championship in Budapest in 1997 and repeated the feat in Texas in 1999. He achieved second place in the Córdoba Cardin tournament in Cuba and the Olympic Games in Sydney (in 2000) crowned his amateur career. However he lost his first bout there.

=== Amateur Highlights ===
- 2000 Summer Olympics, Light Welterweight, lost to Mohamed Allalou (Algeria) 9–17 in first round
- World Amateur Boxing Championships, Light Welterweight, 2 bronze medals (1997, 1999)
- European Junior Championship, Light Welterweight, silver medal (1996)
- 5 Times Amateur Champion Of Czech Republic
- Córdoba Cardin Tournament, Light Welterweight, silver medal (2000)
- Amateur record 230–25–2

== Professional career ==
He signed a contract with German stable "SES" (Sport Events Steinforth) on May 1, 2001, drilling in Magdeburg but spending much time at home in Ústí nad Labem. Nowadays he works under the German manager Ulf Steinforth. During his career, Konečný won multiple belts, winning his first title in 2002 against Artur Drinaj for the German International light middleweight title. He defended this title several times, until its vacation. In 2004 and 2006 he got two title shots for the EBU-EU (European Union) light middleweight title, but in these fights he suffered two of his three career losses, but managed to win the vacant WBO Inter-Continental light middleweight title against Anderson Clayton in Prague. In 2006 he added the IBF Inter-Continental light middleweight title after victory against Ante Bilic, but Konečný then vacated the title. Lukáš managed to retain his WBO belt twice.

=== First world title shot ===
In 2008 the biggest match of his career up to then came with Konečný facing Sergiy Dzinziruk for the WBO light middleweight title. He eventually lost on a majority decision after 12 rounds.

In 2009 he won the Czech middleweight championship.

In 2010 Konečný faced Matthew Hall for the EBU-EU (European Union) light middleweight title again. He prevailed after a TKO in round 6. In 2011 in Prague he defeated Hussein Bayram to become WBO Inter-Continental light middleweight champion for the second time in his career. It was his 11th straight victory and he became one of the top prospects in light middleweight.

=== Interim champion ===
He then finally got his another major title shot with fight scheduled on 30 September. However his opponent Sergiy Dzinziruk cancelled the match according to his alleged injury. A lot of people started to speculate that Dzindiruk was trying to avoid his opponent. Dzindiruk was later stripped of the WBO Light Middleweight belt, which was subsequently won by Zaurbek Baysangurov. After long discussions it was revealed that he would fight Baysangurov on 10 March for the IBO and WBO Light Middleweight Championship. Unfortunately, Baysangurov had to cancel the fight because of his injury. This was already the second title match for Konečný, which was then cancelled. On 9 March, Konečný's stable SES introduced his next opponent. In this match he defeated French boxer Salim Larbi and became the interim WBO Light Middleweight champion.

=== Konečný vs. Baysangurov ===
Konečný finally clashed with Zaurbek Baysangurov in a match in October 2012. Unfortunately for him, Baysangurov successfully retained his title belt after 12 rounds of boxing via a unanimous decision. The final judges’ scores were 119–109, 117-111 and 118–110, all for Baysangurov. Baysangurov used a high work rate to pound out the decision over the heavy-handed Konecny. In the last found, Konecny was cut over his left eye, but it hardly mattered because he was hopelessly behind by that point in the fight and was just looking for a knockout.

Shortly after this fight Konečný was thinking about retirement, but ultimately returned in a match against Karim Achour. This match was scheduled for vacant WBO European middleweight title and saw Konečný's debut in middleweight division. Konečný prevailed over his opponent via unanimous decision.

=== Konečný vs. Quillin ===
After the successful title defense, Konečný moved up to second position in the WBO middleweight rankings. In the March 2014 it was revealed via the web site boxrec.com, that Konečný will face WBO middleweight champion Peter Quillin on March 19 in Washington, D.C. for the world title. Prior to the fight Konečný announced that he will retire after the fight regardless of the result.

The fight was placed on the undercard of Bernard Hopkins vs. Beibut Shumenov; it was Konečný's debut on American soil, having fought previously only in Europe. Although being very much the underdog, Konečný stayed the distance of 12 rounds. Despite the fact that he lost via unanimous decision (119–109, 119–109, 120–108), he proved to be a tough opponent gaining positive reactions from some critics.

== Personal life ==
Lukáš Konečný currently lives in Ústí nad Labem with his wife Jarka and three daughters.

He is son of Milan Konečný, the first Czech professional boxer.

== Professional boxing record ==
57 fights	52 wins	5 losses
By knockout	24	0
By decision	28	5

No.	Result	Record	Opponent	Type	Round, time	Date	Location	Notes
57	Win	52–5	(Czech Republic) Pavel Albrecht	TKO	5 (6)	2021-02-27	(Czech Republic) Hotel Vetruse, Usti nad Labem	
56	Win	51–5	(Slovakia) Matúš Babiak	UD	8 (8)	2018-12-27	O2 arena, Prague, Czech Republic	
55	Loss	50–5	(United States) Peter Quillin	UD	12	2014-04-19	(United States) D.C. Armory, Washington, D.C.	for the WBO middleweight title
54	Win	50–4	(France) Moez Fhima	UD	12	2013-07-13	(Germany) EnergieVerbund Arena, Dresden, Sachsen	retained the European WBO Middleweight title
53	Win	49–4	(France) Karim Achour	TD	12	2013-03-23	(Germany) GETEC Arena, Magdeburg, Sachsen-Anhalt	won the vacant European WBO Middleweight title
52	Loss	48–4	(Russia) Zaurbek Baysangurov	UD	12 (12)	2012-10-06	Palace of Sports, Kyiv, Ukraine	for the WBO light middleweight title.
51	Win	48–3	(France) Salim Larbi	KO	7 (12)	2012-04-05	Vodova Arena, Brno, Czech Republic	won the interim WBO Light Middleweight Championship
50	Win	47–3	(France) Hussein Bayram	UD	12 (12)	2011-05-27	Zlatopramen Arena, Ústí nad Labem, Czech Republic	retain the vacant EBU (European) light middleweight title
49	Win	46–3	(Armenia) Hamlet Petrosyan	UD	12 (12)	2010-12-03	Arena Sparta, Prague, Czech Republic	retain the vacant EBU (European) light middleweight title
48	Win	45–3	(United Kingdom) Matthew Hall	TKO	6 (12)	2010-09-18	(United Kingdom) LG Arena, Birmingham	won the vacant EBU (European) light middleweight title
47	Win	44–3	(Belarus) Konstantin Makhankov	UD	8 (8)	2010-06-04	(Germany) Mehrzweckhalle Grossziethen, Schoenefeld, Brandenburg	
46	Win	43–2	(Romania) Ionut Trandafir Ilie	TKO	4 (10)	2010-03-12	Divadlo Milenium, Prague, Czech Republic	
45	Win	42–3	(Hungary) Attila Kiss	UD	10 (10)	2009-12-30	Lucerna, Prague, Czech Republic	won the vacant Czech middleweight title
44	Win	41–3	(Belarus) Sergey Khomitsky	UD	8 (8)	2009-12-19	DIVS, Ekaterinburg, Russia	
43	Win	40–3	(France) Christophe Karagoz	TKO	8 (10)	2009-07-03	(Germany) Soccio Center, Langenhagen, Niedersachsen	
42	Win	39–3	(France) Jimmy Colas	MD	12 (12)	2009-03-28	(Germany) Mehrzweckhalle Grossziethen, Schoenefeld, Brandenburg	won the EBU-EU (European Union) light middleweight title
41	Win	38–3	(Hungary) Janos Petrovics	UD	8 (8)	2008-11-29	Spodek, Katowice, Poland	
40	Win	37–3	(Brazil) Luiz Augusto Dos Santos	TKO	5 (6)	2008-07-29	Bobycentrum, Brno, Czech Republic	
39	Loss	36–3	(Ukraine) Serhiy Dzyndzyruk	MD	12 (12)	2008-04-26	(Germany) Freiberger Arena, Dresden, Sachsen	for the WBO light middleweight title
38	Win	36–2	(Belgium) Kimfuta Makussu	KO	2 (6)	2008-02-23	(Germany) Brandberge Arena, Halle an der Saale, Sachsen-Anhalt	
37	Win	35–2	(Ukraine) Roman Dzhuman	UD	12 (12)	2007-06-12	Tabor Arena, Maribor, Slovenia	
36	Win	34–2	(France) Serge Vigne	TKO	7 (10)	2007-04-07	(Germany) Universum Gym, Wandsbek, Hamburg	
35	Win	33–2	(Hungary) Gyula Zabo	TKO	2 (6)	2006-12-05	Freizeit Arena, Solden, Austria	
34	Win	32–2	(France) Mehdi Azri	UD	12 (12)	2006-10-10	T-Mobile Arena, Prague, Czech Republic	won the WBO Inter-Continental light middleweight title
33	Win	31–2	(Croatia) Ante Bilic	UD	12 (12)	2006-05-09	Sazka Arena, Prague, Czech Republic	
32	Win	30–2	(Latvia) Sandris Tomsons	UD	4 (4)	2006-04-15	(Germany) Maritim Hotel, Magdeburg, Sachsen-Anhalt	
31	Loss	29–2	(Italy) Michele Piccirillo	UD	12 (12)	2006-03-10	Palasport, Bergamo, Italy	for the vacant EBU (European) light middleweight title
30	Win	29–1	(Poland) Andrzej Butowicz	UD	8 (8)	2005-11-16	Hotel Hilton, Prague, Czech Republic	
29	Win	28–1	(Brazil) Anderson Clayton	TKO	3 (12)	2005-09-20	T-Mobile Arena, Prague, Czech Republic	won the vacant WBO Inter-Continental light middleweight title
28	Win	27–1	(Estonia) Dmitri Protkunas	TKO	7 (8)	2005-06-04	(Germany) Ballahaus Arena, Aschersleben, Sachsen-Anhalt	
27	Win	26–1	(Romania) Adrian Sauca	TKO	3 (8)	2005-04-30	Beck Box-Gym, Prague, Czech Republic	
26	Win	25–1	(Dominican Republic) Felix Vargas	UD	6 (6)	2005-04-02	(Germany) Ofen Stadthalle, Velten, Brandenburg	
25	Win	24–1	(Hungary) Csaba Balatoni	PTS	6 (6)	2005-03-05	Hotel Hilton, Prague, Czech Republic	
24	Win	23–1	(Hungary) Gabor Balogh	UD	1 (4)	2004-10-16	(Germany) Neue Messehalle, Halle an der Saale, Sachsen-Anhalt	
23	Loss	22–1	(Spain) Ruben Varon	SD	10 (10)	2004-09-10	Madrid, Spain	for the EBU-EU (European Union) light middleweight title
22	Win	22–0	(Russia) Murad Makhmudov	UD	10 (10)	2004-07-17	(Germany) Anhalt Arena, Dessau, Sachsen-Anhalt	
21	Win	21–0	(Belarus) Dzmitri Kashkan	RTD	5 (12)	2004-06-05	(Germany) Maritim Hotel, Magdeburg, Sachsen-Anhalt	
20	Win	20–0	(Georgia (country)) Peter Resour	UD	6 (6)	2004-02-21	(Germany) Ballahaus Arena, Aschersleben, Sachsen-Anhalt	
19	Win	19–0	(Lithuania) Raimundas Petrauskas	UD	6 (6)	2003-11-29	(Germany) Lausitz Arena, Cottbus, Brandenburg	
18	Win	18–0	(France) Aziz Daari	UD	10 (10)	2003-10-17	Ústí nad Labem, Czech Republic	won the EBU-EU (European Union) light middleweight title
17	Win	17–0	(Slovakia) Miroslav Kvocka	TKO	3 (6)	2003-07-05	(Germany) Anhalt Arena, Dessau, Sachsen-Anhalt	
16	Win	16–0	(France) Sylvestre Marianini	UD	8 (8)	2003-05-21	Hradec Králové, Czech Republic	
15	Win	15–0	(Ukraine) Pylyp Bystrykov	TKO	7 (10)	2003-04-25	(Germany) Maritim Hotel, Magdeburg, Sachsen-Anhalt	
14	Win	14–0	(Armenia) Khoren Gevor	TKO	8 (10)	2002-12-21	(Germany) Lausitz Arena, Cottbus, Brandenburg	
13	Win	13–0	(Armenia) Khoren Gevor	TD	7 (10)	2002-09-21	(Germany) Bördelandhalle, Magdeburg, Sachsen-Anhalt	
12	Win	12–0	(Romania) Marius Petre Sorin	KO	2 (6)	2002-07-27	(Germany) Filmpark Babelsberg, Potsdam, Brandenburg	
11	Win	11–0	(Czech Republic) Patrik Hruška	UD	6 (6)	2002-06-08	(Germany) Anhalt Arena, Dessau, Sachsen-Anhalt	
10	Win	10–0	(Hungary) Gabor Balogh	TKO	1 (6)	2002-05-11	(Germany) Circus Krone, Munich, Bayern	
9	Win	9–0	(Albania) Artur Drinaj	PTS	4 (14)	2005-04-13	(Germany) Harzlandhalle, Ilsenburg, Sachsen-Anhalt	won the German International light middleweight title
8	Win	8–0	(Czech Republic) Patrik Hruška	PTS	4 (4)	2002-02-23	(Germany) Neu-Isenburg, Hessen	
7	Win	7–0	(South Africa) Ashley Whiteboy	PTS	6 (6)	2002-01-05	(Germany) Bördelandhalle, Magdeburg, Sachsen-Anhalt	
6	Win	6–0	(Uganda) Paul Lee Sebowa	KO	1 (6)	2001-12-08	(Germany) Glaspalast, Dessau, Sachsen-Anhalt	
5	Win	5–0	(Poland) Krzysztof Cierniak	TKO	2 (4)	2001-10-13	(Germany) Nuremberg Arena, Nuremberg, Bayern	
4	Win	4–0	(Hungary) Robert Sathy	TKO	1 (6)	2001-09-29	(Germany) Kempinski Hotel, Halle, Sachsen-Anhalt	
3	Win	3–0	(Czech Republic) Gabriel Botos	UD	4 (4)	2001-09-01	(Germany) Bördelandhalle, Magdeburg, Sachsen-Anhalt	
2	Win	2–0	(Czech Republic) Patrik Hruška	UD	4 (4)	2001-07-07	(Germany) Maritim Hotel, Magdeburg, Sachsen-Anhalt	
1	Win	1–0	(Algeria) Ramdane Kaouane	KO	1 (4)	2001-06-22	(Germany) Salzgitter, Niedersachsen	Konečný's professional debut

Sporting positions
Regional boxing titles
Vacant Title last held by Ryan Rhodes	EBU Super-welterweight champion September 18, 2010 – 2012; Vacated	Vacant Title next held by Sergey Rabchenko
World boxing titles
Vacant Title last held by Zaurbek Baysangurov	WBO Junior middleweight champion Interim title April 5, 2012 – October 6, 2012; Lost bid for full title	Vacant Title next held by Patrick Teixeira
