= Tonton Semakala =

Swedish boxer (born 1975)

Medal record

Representing Sweden

Men's Boxing

World Amateur Championships
Bronze medal – third place	Budapest 1997	Light Welterweight

Tonton Walombua Semakala (born 5 April 1975 in Kinshasa) is a professional boxer from Sweden, who was born in Zaire. Nicknamed "the New Swedish Hammer", Semakala's most notable performance as an amateur was winning the bronze medal at the 1997 World Amateur Boxing Championships in Budapest, Hungary. There he was defeated in the semi-final of the light-welterweight division (– 63.5 kilograms) by Georgia's eventual silver medalist Paata Gvasalia. A year later he turned professional.
