= Benderli Pasha =

Benderli Pasha may refer to:

- Benderli Ali Pasha (died 1821), Ottoman grand vizier (1821)
- "Benderli" Mehmed Selim Pasha (1771–1831), Ottoman grand vizier (1824–28)

== See also ==
- Bender, Moldova ("Benderli" means "from Bender" in Turkish)
- Pasha (title)
