= Valentin Mednek =

Moldovan architect

- Born: 1 June 1910; Comrat
- Died: 27 October 2008 (aged 98); Moscow, Russia
- Citizenship: Moldova
- Education: Ion Mincu University of Architecture and Urban Planning
- Occupation: Architect
- Awards: Medal "For the Victory over Germany in the Great Patriotic War 1941–1945" Medal "For the Defence of Odessa"

Valentin Petrovich Mednek (Russian: Валентин Петрович Меднек; 1 June 1910 – 27 October 2008) was a Moldovan architect. One of the most esteemed people of his profession in Moldova, he was an Honored Artist of the Moldavian SSR. During the Great Patriotic War he was responsible for the construction of fortifications and crossings in Odessa, Novocherkassk, Rostov-on-Don, Stalingrad, and Kremenchug. After the war, Mednek was one of the chief architects in the development plan for the reconstruction of the capital of Moldova, Chișinău, and was also assigned in 1948–9 to initiate the first stage of reconstruction of Bender, and drew up a 15-20 year master plan for its redevelopment in 1952. He was later appointed head of the design institute "Moldavstroyproekt" in Chișinău, and then deputy chairman of the State Construction Committee of MSSR. In October 2000, in honor of Mednek's 90th birthday, a memorial plaque was established outside Chișinău post office building.
