= Misha Miller =

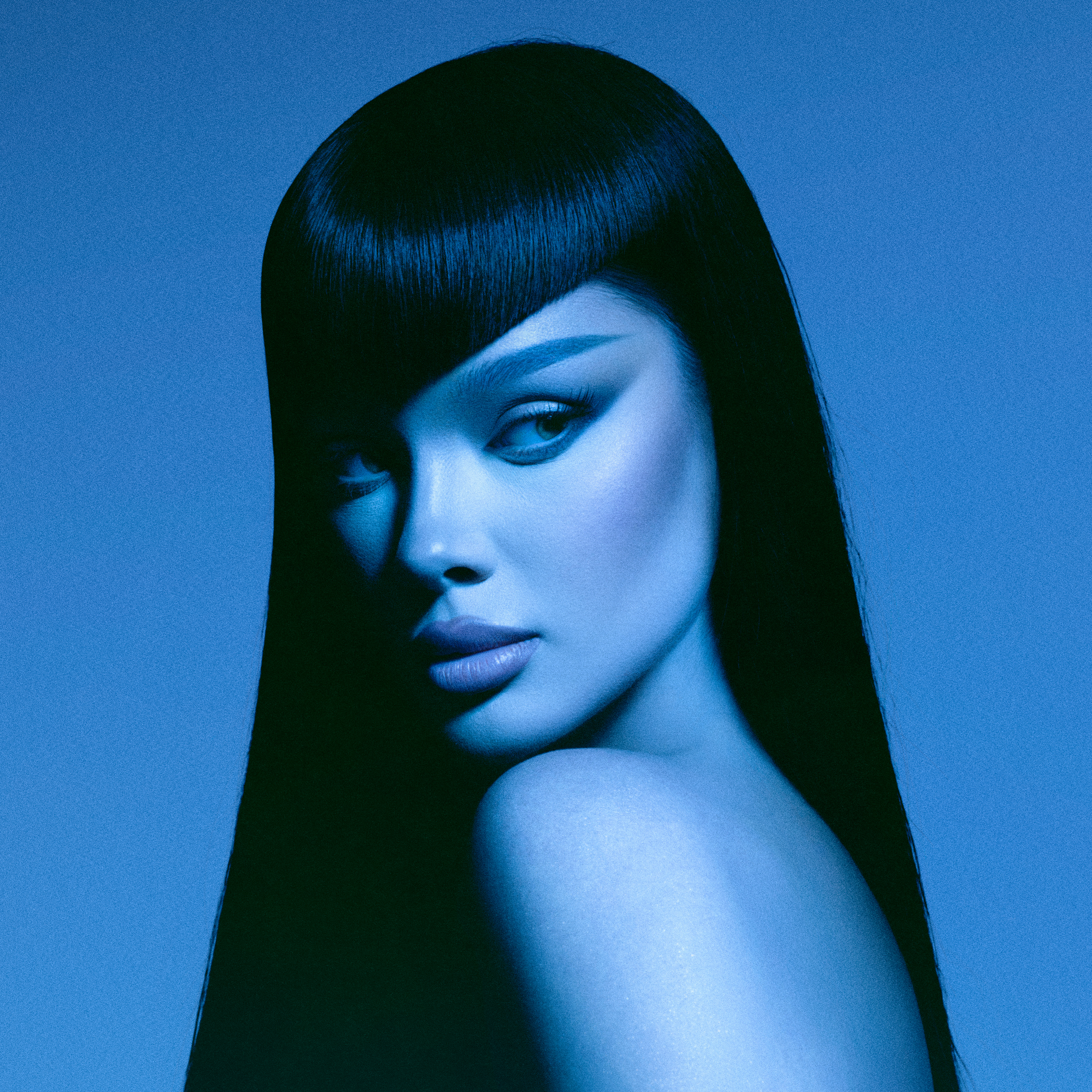
- Miller in 2025

Background information
- Also known as: Misha Miller
- Born: Mihaela Marina Arsene; 13 November 1995 (age 30); Chișinău, Moldova
- Genres: Pop music

Mihaela Marina Arsene (born 13 November 1995), better known by her stage name Misha Miller, is a Moldovan pop singer and songwriter.

== Biography ==
Misha Miller grew up in the Moldovan capital Chișinău. She studied in neighbouring Romania at the Alexandru Ioan Cuza University, where she obtained degrees in political science and banking. Initially, Misha aspired to a career as a journalist, but instead joined the music project United by Dreams. Her first songs in the charts were Scares Touch and Fix Your Heart , collaborations with Manuel Riva and Alex Parker. . In June 2019, she collaborated with Manuel Riva on the single What Mama Said, which reached 29 million views on YouTube. With this same song, she spent nineteen weeks on the Billboard Dance Club Songs chart. In 2020, Misha represented Moldova at the INFEvision Video Contest with the song Smoke Me. Arsene's next single Mahala became a radio success in Ukraine, Romania, Lithuania and the Czech Republic. She also had a performance on the Romanian radio station Radio ZU. This was followed by performances at the Radio România Gala and on a flight between Bucharest and Timișoara. Arsene is signed to Roton Music.

In July 2025, Misha Miler released the single "Don't Leave (Kylie)" together with Akcent and SERA, a remake of Akcent's 2005 single Kylie. Don't Leave (Kylie) was declared Dancesmash by Radio 538. Arsene was honoured at the 2025 WIBA Awards.

== Discography ==
- 2017: Sacred Touch (with Manuel Riva)
- 2017: Fix Your Heart (with Alex Parker)
- 2018: Wild Fire
- 2018: Insane
- 2019: What Mama Said (with Manuel Riva)
- 2020: Smoke Me (mit Sasha Lopez)
- 2021: Fly Me to the Moon (with Jade Shadi, Capablanca & Electric Chapel)
- 2021: Up All Night (met Christian Eberhard)
- 2022: Mahala
- 2023: Un minut
- 2024: Mamma Mia (with The Limba, Andro & Dyce)
- 2024: Ciuleandra (with Boehm)
- 2024: Rakata
- 2025: Bam bam (with Alex Velea)
- 2025: Don't Leave (Kylie) (with Akcent and SERA)
