= Daria Harjevschi =

Romanian librarian

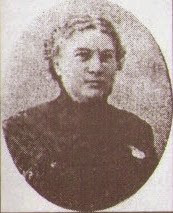
- Harjevschi in 1934
- Born: 1862
- Died: June 26, 1934 (aged 71–72)
- Occupations: Librarian, cultural artist

Daria Harjevschi (1862 – 26 June 1934) was a Romanian librarian and cultural artist from Bessarabia who headed the Chișinău Public Library (the current National Library of the Republic of Moldova) for 40 years, from 1884 to 1924, at the age of 22 being the youngest director of the library in its history. At that time, the library was the only one in the gubernia that operated on behalf of the state. She is remembered for her contributions to improving the library's catalogues by means of systematic alphabetic sorting and by introducing new library services on the basis of study trips to libraries in Kharkiv, Poltava and Odessa and her active participation at the 1921 Russian Librarians Congress in St Petersburg.

In 1889, at her initiative the Librarians’ Congress was organized, which contributed to the improvement of systematic catalogs, to the organization of the unique catalog of magazines and to the better service providing to children. In 1899, Harjevschi went to training to Kharkiv, Poltava and Odessa, and after these trainings, she developed the alphabetically systematic catalog of books. In 1911, she participated at the Congress of Librarians of Russia held in St. Petersburg, where presented the report on the Library of Chișinău, brought suggestions to improve the library activity and exchanged experience with counterparts from other gubernia. In the same year, she visited several libraries on Volga and Kama gubernias.

In over 30 years of running the City Public Library, Harjevschi directed librarians to make more effort and dedication to readers' assistance, encouraged poor children's access to library halls, organized questionnaires among visitors to receive their feedback and other activities. She kept close ties with renowned librarians of the Russian Empire, such as L. Nemoleațki, O. Nikolski, M. Globa, and others. She founded the Amateur Society of Dramatics and a folk theater.
