= Ion Gonța =

Moldovan boxer (born 1978)

Personal information
- Nationality: (Moldova) Moldovan
- Born: Ion Gonţa; 22 October 1978 (age 48) Chişinău, Moldova
- Height: 5 ft 9.5 in (1.77 m)
- Weight: Light middleweight

Boxing career

Boxing record
- Total fights: 24
- Wins: 20
- Win by KO: 6
- Losses: 2
- Draws: 2
- No contests: 0

Ion Gonța (born 22 October 1978) is a Moldovan light middleweight boxer based in Chişinău. His record stands at 17 wins, 2 losses and 2 draws after 17 bouts.
