= Hussein Bayram =

French boxer

Personal information
- Nationality: French
- Born: 28 November 1975 (age 49); Angers, France

Sport
- Sport: Boxing

Hussein Bayram (born 28 November 1975) is a French former professional boxer. He challenged three times for the European super welterweight title between 2004 and 2011. As an amateur, he competed in the men's welterweight event at the 1996 Summer Olympics. At the 1996 Summer Olympics, he lost to Marian Simion of Romania.
