= Sergiu Moraru =

Folklorist

- Born: October 10, 1946; Obreja Veche, Fălești (then part of the Moldavian SSR in the Soviet Union)
- Died: May 21, 1996 (aged 49); Chişinău, Moldova

Sergiu Moraru (10 October 1946 – 21 May 1996) was a folklorist from the Republic of Moldova.

== Works ==
- Ciugur, mugur, mugurele : Ghicitori (1977)
- Poetica liricii popular moldoveneşti (1978)
- Lumea o face, lumea o desface: Ghicitori popular moldoveneşti (1982)
- Speciile folclorice şi realitatea istorică (1985)
- Ştefan cel Mare : Legende, balade, portrete literare (1989)
- Vasile Lupu în folclor şi literatura (1992)
- Folclor din Ţara Fagilor (1993)

== Relevant literature ==
- Niţă-Cocieru, Mariana. "Contribuția etnologului Sergiu Moraru la dezvoltarea folcloristicii din Basarabia–itinerar biografic și științific." In Sergiu Moraru: 75 de ani de la naștere, 7–15. 2021.
