= Adrian Sînă =

Adrian Sina
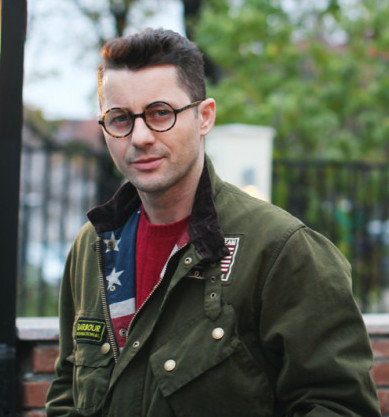

Background information
- Also known as: Adrian Sina, Adi Sina
- Born: Adrian Claudiu Sînă; 18 April 1977 (age 49)
- Origin: Baia Mare, Romania
- Genres: House, electronic, dance-pop
- Occupations: Musician, DJ, record producer, performer, singer-songwriter, radio DJ, entertainer
- Instrument: Vocals
- Years active: 1999–present
- Labels: Roton, Sisterhoodlive Records
- Member of: Akcent
- Website: www.adriansina.ro

Adrian Claudiu Sînă (Romanian pronunciation: [adriˈan ˈsɨnə]; born 18 April 1977), better known as Adrian Sina or simply Adi Sina, is a Romanian singer-songwriter, record producer, radio DJ and entertainer. He is best known as the founder and only remaining original member of the dance-pop group Akcent and also for writing and producing mainstream hit songs for himself and other international artists. He started out as a disc jockey in the 1990s and then created a group with his fellow musician Ramona Barta. He came to prominence as a member of Akcent with the song "Ultima vară" (The Last Summer) in 1999. His group was joined by Marius Nedelcu, Sorin Brotnei and Mihai Gruia. Together they scored multiple number-one hits both in Romania and throughout Eastern Europe, especially in the mid- to late 2000s. Their albums have been certified multi-Platinum by the Uniunea Naţională a Producătorilor de Fonograme din România and millions of copies were sold worldwide. Their signature song was "Kylie", released in 2005.

In the early 2010s, Sina decided to embark on a solo career and co-opted various recording artists on his side. He started his own record label, Premium Artist (formerly known as Sisterhoodlive Records), and recorded some solo hits, such as "Hold On", "I Can't Live Without You" and "Angel". In 2011 he was on the judging panel of the Romanian X Factor where he coached the over 25s. In the meantime, he produced and wrote several number-one and top-ten hits for up-and-rising artists such as boyband Maxim and singer Lidia Buble. He released a single, "Arde ceva" (Something Burning), which was released in 2013. Songs "Lacrimi curg" and "Tu m-ai dat gata" followed, and his latest release is a collaboration with Cojo, namely "Zile bune, zile rele".

In 2019 the singer was chosen by Walt Disney Pictures to provide the Romanian voice of Darwin in the live-action G-Force.

== Solo ventures ==
In the past, he wrote all the songs for his band but never ventured on a solo career. In 2010, Sina released his first solo single, called "Hold On". It reached the top-thirty success in Romania. A year later, he recorded a new song with the vocals of British singer Beverlei Brown, its video being shot in Sharm el-Sheikh, Egypt. Later that year, a new song was released, "Angel", featuring Sandra N. Its video was shot in New York City. The song broke into the top ten of the Romanian Top 100 and was Sina's first solo single to do so. It was the sixteenth most played song in Romania in 2012.

== Return to Akcent and production ==
In early 2014, Sina reactivated the project Akcent, releasing the group's first EP, Around the World.

== Personal life ==
He attended classes at the Caragiale Academy of Theatrical Arts and Cinematography, preparing to be an actor, but then he chose music. He also stated that when he was young he wanted to become a ranger.
