= În Lipsa Mea (song) =

2007 single by Smiley

Single by Smiley featuring Uzzi

from the album În lipsa mea
- Language: Romanian
- Released: November 2007
- Recorded: 2007
- Genre: Hip hop; soft pop; rap
- Length: 3:38
- Label: Cat Music

Smiley singles chronology
"În Lipsa Mea" (2007)	"Designed to Love You" (2008)

Music video
- "În Lipsa Mea" on YouTube

"În Lipsa Mea" (Romanian pronunciation: [ɨn ˈlipsa ˈme̯a]; "In my absence") is a single by Romanian singer Smiley featuring Uzzi which headlines the album with the same title În lipsa mea released in November 2007. It was Smiley's debut single as a solo artist after his career as a member of the band Simplu. The song peaked at number three in the Romania Top 100 chart, spending seventeen weeks there. At the 2008 edition of the Romanian Music Awards, the song won the categories of the Best Male Artist through main singer Smiley and Best New Act.

== Music video ==
A music video for the song was released on December 3, 2007, and was directed and produced by Smiley alongside Cat Music staff.

The video shows the story of main artist Smiley's girlfriend played by his then-time real life partner Laura Cosoi having and affair with another man played by model Bernard Tatomir. The first sequences show Smiley dying inside of an ambulance by gunshot wounds inflicted during fighting his girlfriend's lover.

The video then shows the chronological order of the events. The girlfriend meets her new lover in a night club as they decide to continue having a good time at hers and Smiley's house. The lover drives to the apartment and parks the car across the sidewalk into an unusual position. They go upstairs and undress, with the girlfriend throwing her mobile phone into a fish tank. As the lyrics hint, they started making love right into Smiley's bedroom whilst playing his very own music. Smiley returns home earlier than usual. He immediately notices something isn't right after seeing the lover's car parked right next to the block. He then enters the apartment and sees clothes scathered all over the floor and hears sounds coming from his bedroom upstairs. Smiley then barges into the room and catches his girlfriend and the lover right in the middle of the act. He fights the lover and puts him on the run, but the latter escapes just in time to pull out a gun and shoot Smiley. Shortly after, an ambulance and the police arrive to the crime scene, taking the lover into custody and Smiley into medical care. The video then shows both artists Smiley and Uzzi narrating the lyrics through the video. Uzzi does it from the perspective of a random man from the street, while Smiley does it from the perspective of the soul which exited his dead body. The video ends by showing the EKG heart beat monitor suddenly ending the flatline and working again, hinting Smiley's presumed return to life.

=== Song concept ===
The main message of the song refers to a man's sorrow and sadness after being cheated on. This is highly demonstrated in the lyrics through the refrain: "I would have even sold my own soul for a woman like you". The lyrics also hint the emotional consequences of the traumatized couple member after their partner's affair.

== Charts ==
Chart	Peak position
Romanian Top 100	3

== Personnel ==
- Smiley, Uzzi – vocals, production, arrangements
  - Text – Smiley, Smiley, Marius Moga, Don Baxter and Randi

== Release history ==
- 2008 Romania (as part of În lipsa mea): CD Cat Music 101 2630 2
