= Preocupat Cu Gura Ta =

2008 single by Smiley

Single by Smiley

from the album În lipsa mea
- Language: Romanian
- Released: March 1, 2008
- Recorded: 2008
- Genre: Dance-pop
- Length: 3:53
- Label: Cat Music

Smiley singles chronology
"Designed to Love You" (2008)	"Preocupat Cu Gura Ta" (2008)	"Am Bani de Dat (Tengo dinero)" (2008)

Music video
- "Preocupat Cu Gura Ta" on YouTube

"Preocupat Cu Gura Ta" (Romanian pronunciation: [pre.okuˈpat ku ˈɡura ˈta]; "Busy with your mouth") is a single by Romanian singer Smiley from the album În lipsa mea released on March 1, 2008. The song peaked at number eight in the Romania Top 100 chart, spending eleven weeks there.

At the 2008 edition of the Romanian Music Awards, the song won the category of the Best Pop Song ans was also nominalized for the Best Video category.

== Music video ==
The music video of the song was released alongside the song itself on May 9, 2008, and was directed and produced by Smiley alongside Cat Music staff. The video was shot in Bucharest and took 19 hours to complete.

The video starts by showing main artist Smiley singing up a tree alongside his band. The pelicule shows him portraying a total of eleven characters represented by all kinds of workers, sometimes exposing him as a double. First, the video shows him playing a hotel valet helping a woman (presumably his loved one) enter a taxi. The cameo then switches to the scene from inside the car which was driven by Smiley himself who, this time, was portraying the taxi driver. Shortly after, they make a stop to a red light, while suddenly, another double of Smiley who was playing a poor windshield washer appears but is denied by the driver. As they continue their road, Smiley also plays a traffic policeman who was looking after the taxi which the woman was riding. After the end of the course, the woman enters a restaurant at the door of which Smiley was playing a beggar ignored by the woman. She enters the venue and checks out the menu when another double of Smiley playing a Latino street performer bothers her. The woman then spots another double of Smiley standing to an adiacent table. After a romantic exchange of glances, the latter's apparent girlfriend returned to the table only to find him looking at the protagonist woman and slapped him after which she dumped him. The protagonist woman exits the restaurant and goes for a walk in a park where another double of Smiley was playing a street clown selling balloons. Suddenly, all of the previous characters played by Smiley gather inside the park and start chasing after the woman. She runs away until night falls and stops under the tree in which Smiley was initially singing at the beginning of the video. Suddenly, a younger double of Smiley joins the girl, but is pulled back by the real version of him who kisses the woman, thus making the end of the video.

=== Song concept ===
The concept of the song represents the power of love going on through various situations. The eleven characters played by Smiley share the same goal of having the girl of their dreams by trying to get her attention. Throughout the lyrics, the song speaks about the natural rivalry between men when it comes to fighting for the heart of a woman.

== Charts ==
Chart	Peak position
Romanian Top 100	8

== Personnel ==
- Smiley – vocals, production, arrangements
  - Text – Smiley, Smiley, Marius Moga, Don Baxter and Randi

== Release history ==
- 2008 Romania (as part of În lipsa mea): CD Cat Music 101 2630 2
