= Am Bani de Dat (Tengo dinero) =

2008 single by Smiley

Single by Smiley featuring Alex Velea, Don Baxter & Marius Moga

from the album În lipsa mea
- Language: Romanian
- Released: March 1, 2008
- Recorded: 2008
- Genre: Dance-pop; hip hop; rap
- Length: 4:41
- Label: Cat Music

Smiley singles chronology
"Preocupat Cu Gura Ta" (2008)	"Am Bani de Dat (Tengo dinero)" (2008)	"Plec pe Marte" (2010)

Music video
- "Am Bani de Dat" on YouTube

"Am Bani de Dat (Tengo dinero)" (Romanian pronunciation: [am ˈbanʲ de ˈdat]; "Got money to give/Gotta pay taxes") is a single by Romanian singer Smiley featuring Alex Velea, Don Baxter and Marius Moga from the album În lipsa mea released on March 1, 2008. The song peaked at number nine in the Romania Top 100 chart, spending fifteen weeks there.

The song won the Radio România Actualităţi Awards 2011 category for the Best Album through mother album În lipsa mea. It was also nominalized at the 2009 Romanian Music Awards category for the Best Pop Song and Best Video categories.

== Music video ==
A music video for the song was released on December 3, 2008, and was directed and produced by Smiley alongside Cat Music staff. The video was shot in early February 2008 in Bucharest Old Town

The video starts by showing a frame of main artist Smiley approaching a graffiti wall with an upper title saying "Statu' veghează" (The (Romanian) state is watching). He pulls out an old camera and starts recording himself while singing the lyrics of the song. The video switches to one of the three other featured artists Alex Velea who was strolling the old town of Bucharest also filming himself while singing and dancing with a random kid from the streets. The video also shows cameos of other random ordinary people of Bucharest (presumably taxpayers) and Smiley's former "Simplu" band members singing the lyrics of the song. The video then shows Smiley filming in the Constitution Square, which is placed in front of the Palace of the Parliament, hinting the song's main idea of payment of taxes and fees. The video switches to another artist of the song Don Baxter who sits in a bar drinking and rapping about not paying up his taxes due to lack of money. Fourth artist of the song Marius Moga also makes an appearance as the video shows him singing alongside a band of instrumentists inside a garage while filming himself. Until the end of the video, main cameo appearing characters continue to sing along the song's lyrics.

=== Song concept ===
The song's main message refers to the Romanian people's anthropological and social problems related to lack of money and low incomes, a widely common issue spread among the youth's social age category. All of the four artists, who by the time of the song's release were in their late twenties are presenting through the lyrics the common money problem of the youngsters, while treating the situation in a derogatory way and even by alcohol consumption, in order to forget about it.

== Charts ==
Chart	Peak position
Romanian Top 100	11

== Personnel ==
- Smiley – vocals, production, arrangements
  - Text – Smiley, Smiley, Marius Moga, Don Baxter and Randi

== Release history ==
- 2008 Romania (as part of În lipsa mea): CD Cat Music 101 2630 2
