= Anna Lesko discography =

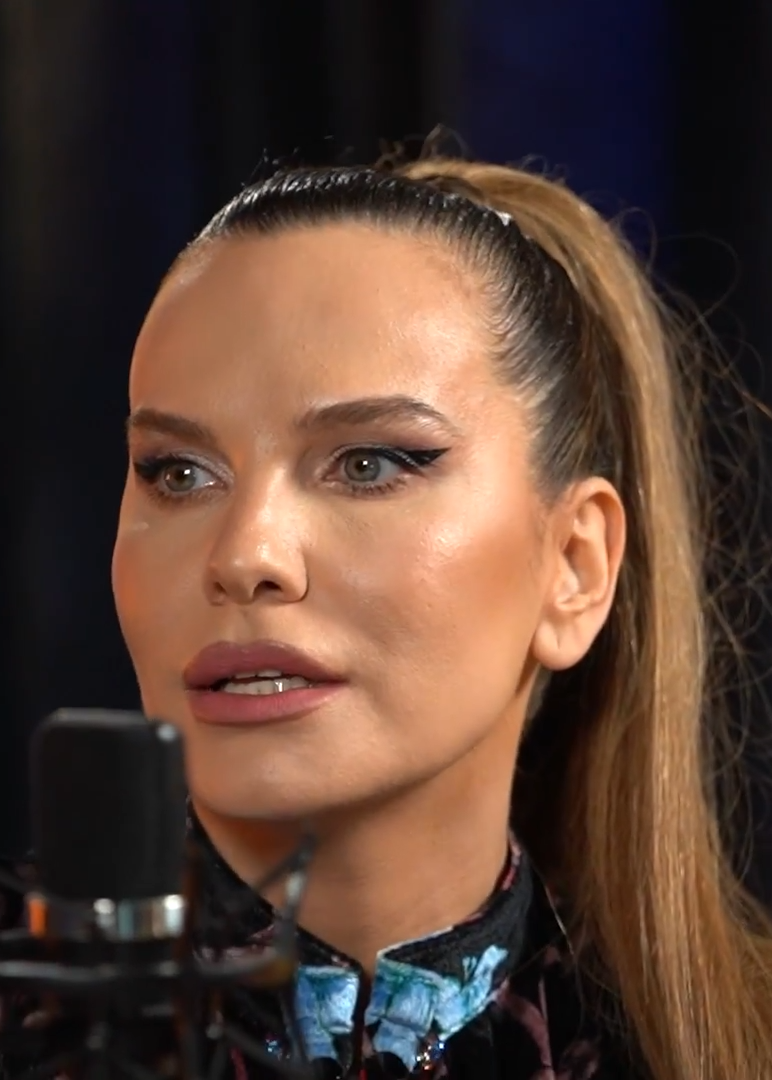
- Anna Lesko during 2023 interview
- Studio albums: 5↙
- EPs: 1↙
- Singles: 15↙
- Video albums: 1↙
- Music videos: 13↙

This article contains the discography of Romanian singer Anna Lesko.

== Studio albums ==
Year	Album	Album details	Singles	Certifications
Studio albums
2002	Flăcări	First studio album; Released: România ROM: 1 January 2002; Label: Cat Music; Formats: CD, CS	"Ard în flăcări" (2002)	
2003	Inseparabili	Second studio album; Released: România ROM: 28 October 2003; Label: Nova Music; Formats: CD, CS; Sales: +35.000 (România)	"Inseparabili" (2003); "Inocența" (2003)	UPFR: Gold
2004	Pentru tine	Third studio album; Released: România ROM: June 2004; Re-released in a special edition; Label: Nova Music; Formats: CD, CS, DL	"Pentru tine" (2004); "Nu mai am timp" (2004); "Lasă-mă să cred" (2005)	
2006	Ispita	Fourth studio album; Released: România ROM: 2 February 2006; Label: Nova Music; Formats: CD, DL; Sales: +10.000 (România)	"Anicyka Maya" (2006)	UPFR: Gold
2010	Jocul seducției	Fifth studio album; Released: România ROM: 23 March 2010; Label: Cat Music; Formats: CD, DL	"1001 dorințe" (2007); "Ignoranța" (2008); "Balalaika" (2009); "In My Bedroom" (2010)	

== CD Maxi singles ==
Year	MCD	Details	Maxi singles	Certifications
2007	24		"Anicyka Maya" (2006); "24" (2006)	

== Singles ==
Year	Single	Peak chart positions		Videoclip	Album
Year	Single	România ROM	România Notes	Videoclip	Album
2002	"Ard în flăcări"	82			Flăcări
2003	"Inseparabili"	—	—		Inseparabili
2003	"Inocența"	49			Inseparabili
2004	"Pentru tine"	79			Pentru tine și Pentru tine:Ediție Specială
2004	"Nu mai am timp" (in collaboration with Alex)	10			Pentru tine și Pentru tine:Ediție Specială
2005	"Lasă-mă să cred"	27			
2006	"Anycka Maya"	2			Ispita
2006	"24"	10			24 (maxi single)
2007	"1001 dorințe"	27			Jocul seducției
2008	"Ignoranța"	#	—		Jocul seducției
2009	"Balalaika"	#	—		Jocul seducției
2010	"In My Bedroom"	44			Jocul seducției
2011	"Get It"	56			—
2011	"Wake Up"	61			—
2012	"Go Crazy" (in collaboration with Gilberto)	—	—		—
2020	"Ivanko" (in collaboration with Culita Sterp)				—
# Chart position was not disclosed during promotion.

== Videos ==
=== Music video collections ===
Year	Title	Details	List	Certifications
2007	Anna Lesko Video Collection	First music video collection; Includes interview with the singer; Released: February 2007; Label: Nova Music; Formats: DVD	"Ard în flăcări" (2002); "Inseparabili" (2003); "Inocența" (2003); "Pentru tine" (2004); "Nu mai am timp" (2004); "Lasă-mă să cred" (2005); "Anicyka Maya" (2006); "24" (2006); Interview	
