= Panda Madam =

Single by Anda Adam

from the album AMO
- Released: 14 February 2012 (Note: Although the digital release date of "Panda Madam" indicates 14 February 2012, the music video was made available on YouTube in November of 2011.)
- Recorded: 2011
- Genre: Dance
- Length: 3:27
- Label: Roton
- Songwriter(s): Marius Moga
- Producer(s): Marius Moga

Anda Adam singles chronology
"Trust" (2011)	"Panda Madam" (2012)	"Feel" (2012)

Music video
- "Panda Madan" on YouTube

"Panda Madam" (often stylized as "pAnda mAdam") is a song by Romanian singer Anda Adam, recorded and released for her third studio album AMO (2013). It was released as the fifth single from the record on 14 February 2012, following the previous singles — "My Love on You" (2009), "Cadillac" (2010), "Show Me" (2010), and "Trust" (2011). The track was written and produced by Marius Moga, who has previously produced many of Anda's works. The song experienced moderate chart success in Sweden, Romania, and Turkey, peaking number 29, 26, and 3 respectively. A remix EP was also released in 2012, which featured remixes of the songs "Panda Madam", "Feel" (2012), and "Show Me".

An accompanying music video for "Panda Madam" was premiered on November 14, 2011. Directed by Alex Ceaușu, the clip features Anda Adam and couple of her friends in stewardess and pilot costumes flying in an airplane around the world in all seven continents. The song was met positively, a critic comparing it to the singer's biggest hit in the native country, "Ce ți-aș face (Selecta)" (2005) by calling it a "revival".

== Promotion and music video ==
Anda performed the song live on the Romanian TV show Neatza cu Răzvan și Dani on 27 December, 2011. The singer also performed the song at NRJ Music Tour in Beirut, Lebanon on 2 July, 2012.

The music video, shot and directed by Alex Ceaușu, was premiered on November 14, 2011. It managed to gain over 12.000 views in the first 24 hours of its upload. The video for the song represents Anda dressed in a pilot costume flying in a plane with a couple of fellow females, dressed as stewardesses. The music video shows various people from different countries dancing to the song, including Cuba, Mexico, Brazil, Egypt and many others from all the continents.

== Critical reception and Charts Performance ==
Alexandru Manea of Romanian website ADPM called the song "cool" with some accents of "hip-hop". He compared the song to "Ce ți-aș face (Selecta)" which became the singer's biggest hit in the native country, by calling it a "revival", and later "Selecta 2011".

Commercially, the song experiences moderate chart success in countries such as Sweden, Romania and Turkey. In the singer's native country, Romania, the song spend seven weeks on the Airplay 100, reaching its peak of 26 in its sixth week.

== Track listing ==
- Official versions (Note: This acts as a summary of all versions of the single found on digital and physical releases.)
1. "Panda Madam (Radio Edit)" – 3:27
2. "Panda Madam (Extended Version)" – 5:15
3. "Panda Madam (Zampa Tools Mix)" – 4:50
4. "Panda Madam (LLP Remix)" – 5:07
5. "Panda Madam (Lazybox Remix)" – 5:54
6. "Panda Madam (Lazybox Remix Edit)" – 3:25

== Charts ==
Chart (2011 – 2012)	Peak position
Turkey (Number One Chart)	3
Sweden (Aqua Charts)	29
Romania (Airplay 100)	26

== Release history ==
Country	Date	Format(s)	Label	Ref.
Various	14 February 2012	Digital download	Roton	
Various	N/A 2012	CD	Roton	
