= Designed to Love You =

2008 single by Smiley

Single by Smiley

from the album În lipsa mea
- Released: March 1, 2008
- Recorded: 2008
- Genre: Latin pop
- Length: 3:16
- Label: Cat Music

Smiley singles chronology
"În Lipsa Mea" (2007)	"Designed to Love You" (2008)	"Preocupat Cu Gura Ta" (2008)

Music video
- "Designed to Love You" on YouTube

"Designed to Love You" is a single by Romanian singer Smiley from the album În lipsa mea released on March 1, 2008. The song peaked at number twenty-nine in the Romania Top 100 chart, spending five weeks there. The song was nominalized at the 2009 Romanian Music Awards category for the Best Pop Song and indirectly with main artist Smiley at the Best Male artist category. The song won the Radio România Actualităţi Awards 2011 category for the Best Album through mother album În lipsa mea.

== Music video ==
A music video for the song was released on April 30, 2009, and was directed and produced by Smiley alongside Cat Music staff and Iulian Moga. The video was shot at the beginning of April 2009 inside Băneasa Shopping City, one of the largest malls Bucharest.

The plot starts by showing Smiley and his band start singing the very song of the video in an obscure dim-lighted space. In parallel with the band's performance, the video shows Smiley and then-time girlfriend, Romanian actress Laura Cosoi beginning their day while still in bed. Smiley is the first one to get up, as the video shows their bed was actually inside of a public and open antiquities gallery from the Băneasa Shopping City mall. Smiley goes to the mall's bathroom dressed in his bathrobe for his morning routine. He then goes to the nearest coffee shop, prepares himself a cup of coffee and sits down to a table already occupied by a couple. The latters tell Smiley to leave their table as there are more free nearby. Smiley tells them not to worry about him, then quickly sips his coffee and leaves the table and the couple baffled about the situation. He continues to stroll the mall and randomly picks up a table and two chairs which he later arranges for two. He then goes to the nearest restaurant and prepares breakfast. The video shows his girlfriend who just got out of her bed from the antiquities store seeing a suite of paper arrows on the floor. She follows them all the way to the table Smiley previously set for breakfast. They both enjoy their food as the video fades to end.

=== Song concept ===
The video presents private-life daily routine stuff done into public spaces almost without anyone criticising or even noticing Smiley and his girlfriend about it, things which in normal life wouldn't have been possible. The entire plot of the video brings a direct reference to the song's title "Designed to Love You", which explains Smiley's actions as he would do anything for his girlfriend no matter how weird it looks.

== Charts ==
Chart	Peak position
Romanian Top 100	29

== Personnel ==
- Smiley – vocals, production, arrangements
  - Text – Smiley, Marius Moga, Don Baxter and Randi

== Release history ==
- 2008 Romania (as part of În lipsa mea): CD Cat Music 101 2630 2
