= În lipsa mea =

În Lipsa Mea

Studio album by Smiley
- Released: 1 March 2008
- Recorded: 2008
- Genres: Dance-pop; funk; hip hop; soul; rap
- Length: 38:33
- Label: Cat Music
- Producer: Smiley

Smiley chronology
În Lipsa Mea (2008)	Plec pe Marte (2010)

Singles from În Lipsa Mea
- 1. "În Lipsa Mea" Released: 1 March 2008

În lipsa mea (Romanian pronunciation: [ɨn ˈlipsa ˈme̯a]; In my absence) is the debut studio album by Romanian singer Smiley, released on March 1, 2008 by Cat Music. The album peaked at number three in the Romania Top 100 charts with the main single, "În lipsa mea", spending four weeks within the top 10 and ten weeks altogether in the Romanian charts. The album earned a gold certification for shipments in excess of 10,000 copies in Romania.

The album won the 2009 Romanian Music Awards prize for the Best Album. It also featured Marius Moga, Alex Velea, Uzzi, Don Baxter and Smiley's former Simplu band mate CRBL as collaborators. The preponderant language of the songs is Romanian, with a couple of exceptions where the songs are also interpreted in English. From a total of ten songs, the album presents five featuring singles and five single songs.

Smiley, Marius Moga, Don Baxter and Randi were the main composers of the lyrics for all tracks.

== Track listing ==
No.	Title	Writer(s)	Length
1.	"Cea Mai Tare Piesă (The best song) (feat. Don Baxter)"	Smiley; Marius Moga; Don Baxter; Randi	3:32
2.	"Preocupat Cu Gura Ta (Busy with your mouth)"	Smiley; Marius Moga; Don Baxter; Randi	3:53
3.	"În Lipsa Mea (In my absence) (feat. Uzzi)"	Smiley; Marius Moga; Don Baxter; Randi	3:38
4.	"Designed to Love You"	Smiley; Marius Moga; Don Baxter; Randi	3:16
5.	"So Cold (feat. CRBL)"	Smiley; Marius Moga; Don Baxter; Randi	3:51
6.	"Pe Unde Îți Umblă Inima (Where your heart leads)"	Smiley; Marius Moga; Don Baxter; Randi	3:42
7.	"Am Bani De Dat (Tengo Dinero) (Got money to give/Gotta pay taxes) (feat. Don Baxter, Alex Velea & Marius Moga)"	Smiley; Marius Moga; Don Baxter; Randi	4:41
8.	"De Ai Fi Un Cântec... (If you were a song) (feat. Marius Moga)"	Smiley; Marius Moga; Don Baxter; Randi	3:57
9.	"Simt Că Mor (I feel like I'm dying)"	Smiley; Marius Moga; Don Baxter; Randi	3:42
10.	"Un Pas Înainte (One step forward)"	Smiley; Marius Moga; Don Baxter; Randi	3:21
Total length:			38:33

== Personnel ==
- Smiley – vocals, production, arrangements
- Marius Moga – backing vocals, production, arrangements
- Alex Velea – backing vocals (uncredited)
- Uzzi – vocals (secondary)
- Don Baxter – vocals (secondary)
- CRBL – vocals (secondary)

== Certifications ==
Region	Certification	Certified units/sales
Romania	Gold	10,000

== Release history ==
- 2008 Romania: CD Cat Music 101 2630 2

== See also ==
- List of certified albums in Romania
