= Alex Velea =

Romanian singer (born 1984)

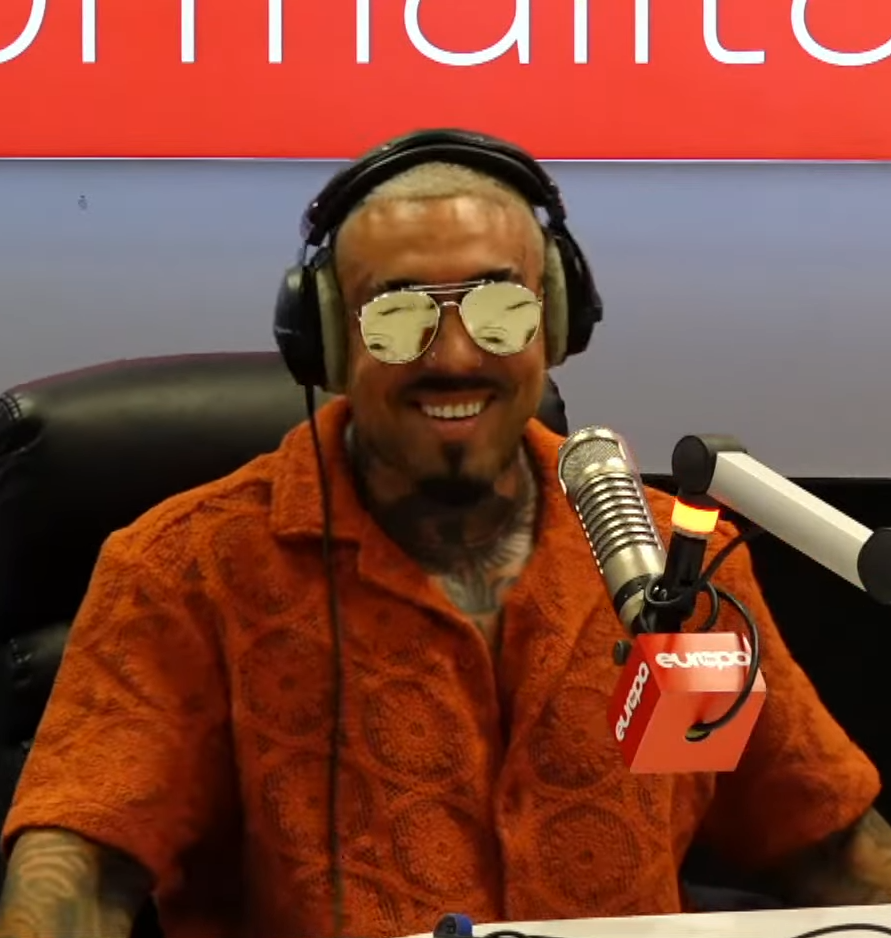
- Velea in July 2024

Background information
- Born: Alexandru Ionuț Velea; 13 May 1984 (age 42); Craiova, Romania
- Genres: Pop; hip hop; dance; EDM; (2007–2013); reggae; trap; trapanele
- Occupations: Singer; songwriter; record producer; actor; television presenter and personality
- Years active: 2004–present
- Labels: Golden Boy Society; HaHaHa Production; Roton; Cat Music; MediaPro Music
- Partner: Antonia Iacobescu
- Children: 2

Alexandru Ionuț Velea (Romanian pronunciation: [alekˈsandru joˈnuts veˈle̯a]; born 13 May 1984) is a Romanian singer, songwriter, television personality and actor from Craiova. Velea is a two-time recipient of the Romanian Music Awards "Best Pop Artist" prize and a one-time nominee at the MTV Europe Music Awards for the Best Romanian Act. He is one of the most iconic figures in the Romanian music industry, having released more than forty single hits and collaborating in more than fifty songs as a featured artist alongside various other notable artists such as Smiley, Connect-R, Puya, Grasu XXL and Anda Adam.

He began his career as the winner of the 2003 edition of the Star Factory competition. Between August and December 2018, Velea worked as the co-host of the Romanian talk-show Acces direct alongside Simona Gherghe.

== Early life ==
Velea was born on May 13, 1984, in Craiova, Romania. He discovered his passion for music from an early age, starting to sing at the age of nine. At the age of eleven, he became a student at his hometown's Children's Palace. At the age of sixteen, he began to study classic canto for a total of four years. He is of Romani descent.

== Musical career ==
=== Pop/HipHop career ===
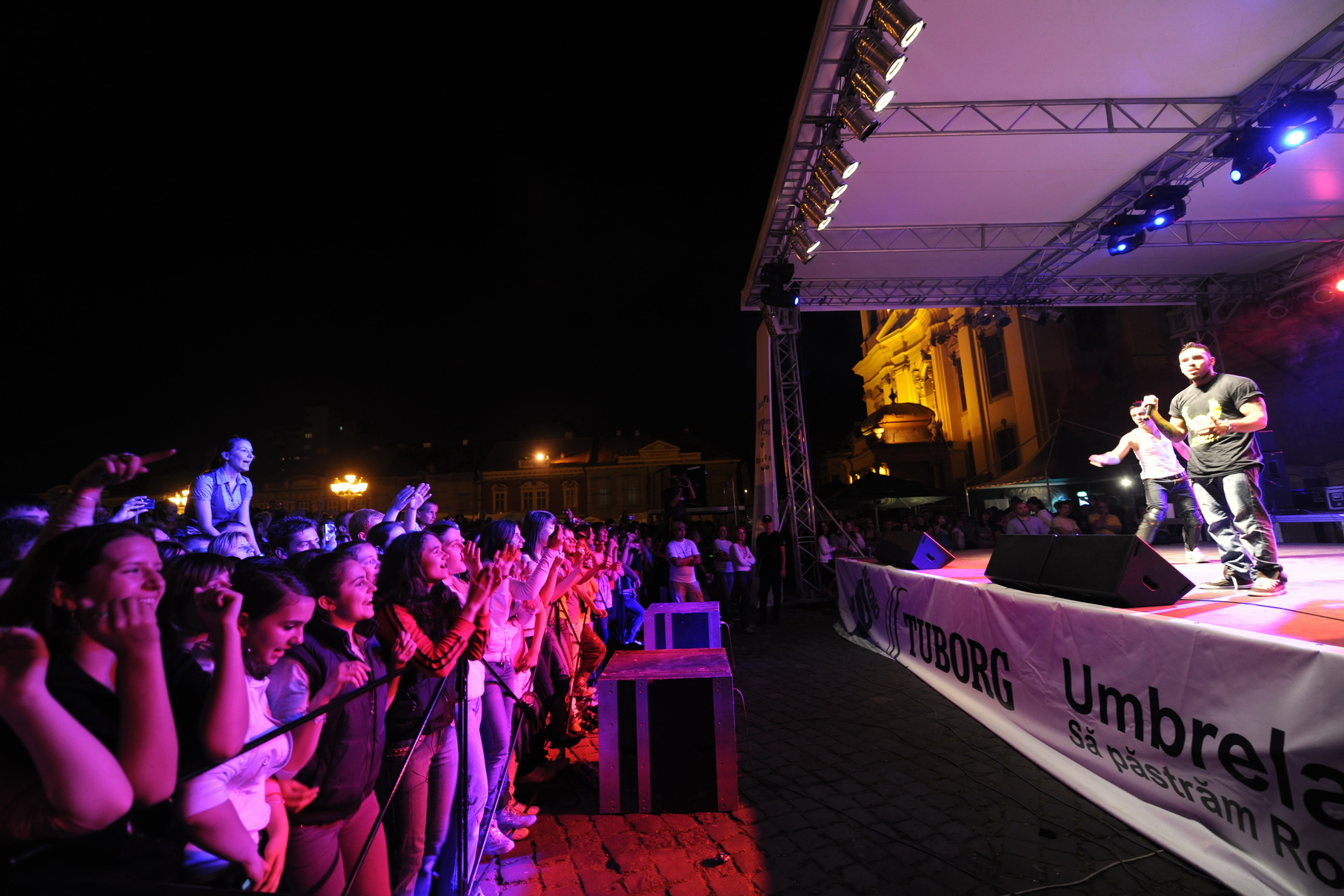
Velea (far right) during a concert at Timișoara in May 2009.

After winning the competition show Star Factory in 2003-2004 and participating at the Romanian counterpart of the Big Brother reality show, Velea made his musical debut alongside Anna Lesko in the song entitled Nu mai am timp (I have no more time left) (2004) released in the album Pentru tine (For you) (2004).

A collaboration with Anda Adam followed for her second solo album, Confidential (2005). The song, entitled "Ce ti-aș face/Selecta (What I'd do to you/Selecta)" (2005) earned great success in Romania, being broadcast often on music stations. His debut album, entitled Yamasha, (Note: A romanian slang for "take me like this" (Ia-mă așa).) was released in the fall of 2006. For this album, Alex collaborated with Smiley, Puya, Marius Moga, Connect-R, Matteo and Don Baxter. Four songs were promoted from the album: "Yamasha" (2006), "Dragoste la prima videre" (Love at first sight) (feat. Connect-R) (2006), "Când sunt cu tine" (When I'm with you) (feat. Mandinga) (2006) and "Doamna mea" (My lady) (2006). Yamasha brought him nominalizations at the "Best show", "Best male singer" and "Best new artist" categories at the 2007 edition of the Romanian Music Awards.

In 2009, Velea released the songs "Doar ea" (Only her) and "Secret (discret)". In the same year, he joined the production team of the musical group Radio Killer, under the stage name "Crocodealer", sharing the nickname of one of the "seven killers" with his group mates.

He also released the song named "Don't say it's over" which became the hit of year 2010, and whose video presented a choreography which generated one of the biggest flashmobs in Romania. It took place in Bucharest's Constitution Square, in June the same year.

These songs reveal the real me to the public... This is me... I tried to write down my thoughts, feelings and experiences...'Yamasha' represents myself.

— Velea on his song "Yamasha" album released in 2006.

In September 2011, he released the song "Whisper". In April 2012, Velea released the song "Când noaptea vine" (When the night comes) which was widely received by the public. In June 2012, during the Romanian Music Awards event, he released a new hit, "Minim doi" (Minimum two). The song managed to collect millions of views on YouTube in a few days time. Shortly after, he released the music video for the song, a clip shot in Ferentari, a marginalized neighborhood of Bucharest. Also in June 2012, he won the award for "Best Pop" artist at the Romanian Music Awards. The song topped the Romanian music charts, occupying the fourth position in the top 10, and the 33rd position in Bulgarian charts.

In 2013 he released the songs "E Marfă Tare" (It's cool stuff) and the continuation of the song in a collaboration with Pacha Man "Aia E (That's it)".

In 2019, together with Lino Golden, Mario Fresh and Rashid, Velea founded the band Golden Gang (which later became a label itself), with which they released their first album "10 out of 10" the same year.

=== New musical styles ===
Following a challenge received in a creative training camp in Borșa, the artist composed, in just one hour, a manele song with electrifying lyrics named "Dau moda (I start the fashion)" (2020) whose lyrics start as: "Gucci, Gucci, Balenciaga/I'll buy you designer clothes, but you I want in a thong". Being surprised by the audience's reaction and listening to the fans' requests, he later released the official version of the song as a featuring hit alongside fellow singers Jador and Lino Golden. It became an immediate success, despite being released amidst the COVID-19 pandemic, becoming top trending on YouTube in that respective year, and collecting a total of 90 million views on the social platform.

Encouraged by the success of the first song, Velea and Jador, release their second manea song, "Arde-mă, baby" (Burn me, baby) (2020), which also became an instant success and made it to the first place into the top trending songs on YouTube in less than a week from its release date. The song collected over 40 million views.

== Other media ==
=== Filmography ===
In 2009, Velea made his videography debut on the big screens, with the "Un film simplu (A Simple Movie)" (2008) film directed by Tom Gatsoulis, where he played a negative role of himself alongside Simplu band members and various other notable autochthon actors. He starred in several more pelicules such as Nașa (The Godmother) (2011), Selfie (2014), Zăpadă, Ceai și Dragoste (Snow, Tea and Love) (2021), and Băieți deștepți (Wise guys) (2023). He most recently played the role of "Bujor" in the 2023 picture "Tigru" (Tiger) alongside Paul Ipate and others.

=== Reality shows ===
In 2007, Velea participated in the Dansez pentru tine show contest where he teamed up with his dance partner Cristina Stoicescu, fighting for a noble cause, and trying to help raise money for Stoicescu's ill husband. The team finished on the first place and obtained enough funds to financially sustain Stoicescu's family.

==== Television ====
Year	Title	Role	Ref.
2008	Un film simplu	Himself	
2011	Nașa	Spânu	
2014	Selfie	Pepenar 2	
2018	Acces direct	Presenter	
2021	Zăpadă, Ceai și Dragoste	Himself	
2023	Băieți deștepți	Narcis	
2023	Tigru	Bujor	

==== Animation ====
Year	Title	Role	Ref.
2015	Over the Garden Wall	Wirt (voice)	

=== Voice acting ===
Velea accepted the challenge offered by Turner Broadcasting System to be the voice of Wirt in the series Over the Garden Wall, which aired on Cartoon Network from April 6, 2015.

== Discography ==
=== Studio albums ===
List of studio albums
Title	Album details
Yamasha	Released: 2006; Format: CD, digital download; Label: Roton

=== Compilation albums ===
List of compilation albums
Title	Album details
Hit List - Tabu	Released: 2011; Format: CD, digital download; Label: Roton

=== Singles ===
==== As lead artist ====
List of singles, with selected chart positions
Title	Year	Peak chart positions			Album
Title	Year	ROM For peak positions in Romania: "Când sunt cu tine": "Romanian Top 100". Archived from the original on 1 April 2008.; "Yamasha": "2Night": "Ce n-aș da": "Dragoste la prima vedere": "Doamna mea": "Jurnalul unei fete": "Perfect": "Îți mulțumesc": "Doar ea": "Secret (discret)": "Romanian Top 100".; "Don't say it's over": "One shot": "Whisper": "Când noaptea vine": "Minim doi": "Fantezii": "E marfă tare": "Din vina ta": "Defectul tău sunt eu": "Tiki taka": "Bani pe tine": "Ziua mea": "Degeaba": "Dulce împăcare": "Ce mai știi de noi": "Latino vero": "Sentimente sau instincte": "Animale": "Ai stil": "Frige": "Sahara": "Străino": "Cădere în gol": "Mona Lisa De Cuba": "Neatent": "Arde-mă baby": "Ca vara trecută": "Ciorditoru' pur": "Du-te": "Fake-urile": "Sifon afon": ""Sifon Afon" Fapte - Velea Talent (Realizări zilnice de top (Top 100 de cântece))".; "Balerina": "Dau să sară": "Roca Roca": "Ultimul sărut": "Dau în ei ca-n aparate":	BUL	CIS	Album
"Când sunt cu tine" (feat. Mandinga)	2006	—	—	—	Non-album singles
"Yamasha"	2006	—	—	—	Yamasha
"2Night"	2006	—	—	—	Yamasha
"Ce n-aș da"	2006	—	—	—	Yamasha
"Dragoste la prima vedere" (feat. Connect-R)	2006	—	—	—	Yamasha
"Doamna mea"	2006	—	—	—	Yamasha
"Jurnalul unei fete"	2006	—	—	—	Yamasha
"Perfect"	2006	—	—	—	Yamasha
"Îți mulțumesc"	2006	—	—	—	Yamasha
"Doar ea"	2009	—	—	—	Non-album singles
"Secret (discret)" (feat. Puya)	2009	—	—	—	Secret
"Don't say it's over"	2010	4	—	—	Non-album singles
"One shot"	2010	—	—	—	Non-album singles
"Whisper"	2011	—	—	—	Non-album singles
"Când noaptea vine"	2012	—	—	—	Non-album singles
"Minim doi"	2012	—	33	—	Roca Roca
"Fantezii" (feat. Cabron)	2013	—	—	—	Non-album singles
"E marfă tare"	2013	—	—	—	Non-album singles
"Din vina ta"	2014	—	—	—	Non-album singles
"Defectul tău sunt eu"	2014	—	—	—	Non-album singles
"Tiki taka"	2015	—	—	—	Non-album singles
"Bani pe tine" (feat. Micutzu)	2016	—	—	—	Non-album singles
"Ziua mea"	2016	—	—	—	Non-album singles
"Degeaba"	2016	—	—	—	Non-album singles
"Dulce împăcare"	2016	—	—	—	Non-album singles
"Ce mai știi de noi"	2017	—	—	—	Non-album singles
"Latino vero"	2017	—	—	—	Non-album singles
"Sentimente sau instincte"	2017	—	—	—	Non-album singles
"Animale"	2018	—	—	—	Non-album singles
"Ai stil"	2018	—	—	—	Non-album singles
"Frige" (feat. Shift)	2018	—	—	—	Non-album singles
"Sahara" (feat. Antonia & Lino Golden)	2018	—	—	—	Non-album singles
"Străino"	2018	—	—	—	Non-album singles
"Cădere în gol" (feat. MIRA)	2019	—	—	—	Cădere în gol
"Mona Lisa De Cuba"	2019	—	—	—	Non-album singles
"Neatent"	2019	—	—	—	Non-album singles
"Arde-mă baby" (feat. Jador)	2020	—	—	—	Non-album singles
"Ca vara trecută" (feat. Blvck Matias)	2020	—	—	—	Roca Roca
"Ciorditoru' pur"	2020	—	—	—	Non-album singles
"Du-te" (feat. Lino Golden)	2020	—	—	—	Non-album singles
"Fake-urile"	2020	—	—	—	Non-album singles
"Sifon afon"	2020	1	—	—	Non-album singles
"Balerina"	2021	—	—	—	Non-album singles
"Dau să sară"	2021	—	—	—	Non-album singles
"Roca Roca"	2021	—	—	—	Roca Roca
"Ultimul sărut"	2022	—	—	—	Non-album singles
"Dau în ei ca-n aparate" (feat. Dani Mocanu)	2023	—	—	—	Non-album singles
"—" denotes releases that did not chart or were not released in that territory.

==== As featured artist ====
List of singles, with selected chart positions
Title	Year	Peak chart positions	Album
Title	Year	ROM	Album
"Nu mai am timp" (Anna Lesko feat. Alex Velea)	2004	—	Pentru tine
"Calul bălan" (Nicu Alifantis & Zan feat. Alex Velea)	2005	—	Vinyl Collection (Nicu Alifantis)
"Ce ți-aș face (Selecta)" (Anda Adam feat. Alex Velea)	2005	20	Confidential
"Mai vrei" (La Familia & C.I.A. fet. Alex Velea)	2006	—	O mare familie
"Binecuvântat" (La Familia & C.I.A. fet. Alex Velea)	2006	—	O mare familie
"Dacă dragostea dispare" (Connect-R feat. Alex Velea)	2007	—	Dacă dragostea dispare
"Baby don't cry" (Connect-R feat. Alex Velea)	2008	—	Dacă dragostea dispare
"Am Bani de Dat" (feat. Smiley, Don Baxter and Marius Moga)	2008	9	În lipsa mea
"Simplu" (Puya feat. Alex Velea)	2008	—	Muzică De Tolăneală & Depravare
"Turnin'" (Grasu XXL feat. Alex Velea)	2009	—	Oameni
"Around the world" (Deepside Deejays feat. Alex Velea & Grasu XXL)	2009	—	Around the world
"Sus pe bar" (Puya feat. Alex Velea)	2010	—	Românisme - Partea I
"You give me love" (Ștefan Stan feat. Alex Velea)	2011	—	Povestea mea
"Convict" (Simplu feat. Alex Velea)	2011	—	Convict
"Digital" (Cabron feat. Alex Velea)	2011	—	Non-album singles
"Maidanez" (Puya feat. Doddy, Posset, Mahia Beldo & Alex Velea)	2012	—	Non-album singles
"Cai Verzi pe Pereți" (Smiley & Alex Velea feat. Don Baxter)	2012	—	Non-album singles
"Aia e" (Pacha Man feat. Alex Velea)	2013	—	Aia e
"Dincolo de Cuvinte" (Smiley feat. Alex Velea)	2013	—	Acasă
"Praf" (Puya feat. Alex Velea)	2013	—	Non-album singles
"Alerg" (Rashid feat. Alex Velea & Cabron)	2014	—	Alerg
"Am rămas cu gândul la tine" (Mario Fresh feat. Alex Velea)	2014	—	Non-album singles
"Hey Ma" (Claydee feat. Alex Velea)	2014	—	Hey Ma
"Îmi pare rău" (Speak feat. Alex Velea & D.O.C.)	2014	—	Non-album singles
"Suleyman" (Jon Baiat Bun feat. Ruby, Alex Velea & Rashid)	2014	—	Non-album singles
"Antonio Banderas" (Lino Golden feat. Alex Velea)	2015	—	Non-album singles
"Băiat bun" (Jon Baiat Bun feat. Don Baxter & Alex Velea)	2015	—	Non-album singles
"Băiat rău" (Jon Baiat Bun feat. Alex Velea)	2015	—	Non-album singles
"Îmi e dor" (Boier Bibescu feat. Alex Velea)	2015	—	Non-album singles
"Izabela (Part 2)" Golden Boy Society (Jon Baiat Bun, Karie, Rashid & Alex Velea)	2015	—	Non-album singles
"N-am timp" (Karie feat. Puya & Alex Velea)	2015	—	Non-album singles
"#StareDeShow" (Boier Bibescu feat. Puya, Jon Baiat Bun, Rashid & Alex Velea)	2015	—	Non-album singles
"Amintiri" (Jon Baiat Bun feat. Alex Velea)	2016	—	Non-album singles
"Monstru" (Boier Bibescu feat. Alex Velea)	2016	—	Non-album singles
"N-am văzut ca tine" (Lino Golden feat. Alex Velea)	2016	—	Non-album singles
"S.R.L. Lu' Jon" (Jon Baiat Bun feat. Rashid & Alex Velea)	2016	—	Non-album singles
"Bună rău" (Lino Golden feat. Alex Velea)	2017	—	Non-album singles
"Iubirea mea" (Antonia feat. Alex Velea)	2017	—	Non-album singles
"Seară ca în Jamaica" (Rashid feat. Alex Velea, Matteo & Shift)	2017	—	Non-album singles
"A meritat" (Rashid feat. Alex Velea, Byga & Foreign Boys)	2018	—	Non-album singles
"Nicio regulă" (Anda Adam feat. Alex Velea)	2018	—	Non-album singles
"Dus de val" (Bonne feat. Alex Velea)	2019	—	Non-album singles
"Mai stai" (Laola feat. Alex Velea)	2020	—	Non-album singles
"Orașul trist" (Matteo feat. Alex Velea)	2020	—	Non-album singles
"Vibe diferit" (Denis feat. Alex Velea)	2020	—	Non-album singles
"Decepții" (John Baiat Bun feat. Alex Velea & Mario Fresh)	2024	—	Non-album singles
"Hotel" (Drei feat. Alex Velea, Bvcovia & andrei)	2024	—	Non-album singles
"—" denotes releases that did not chart or were not released in that territory.

==== Promotional singles (co-productions) ====
Title	Year	Album
"Bruneta" (with Tzancă Uraganu & Jador)	2020	Non-album singles
"La comanda ta" (with George Talent & Zanni)	2020	Roca Roca
"O iubire mare" (with Tzancă Uraganu & Jo Klass)	2020	Non-album singles
"Nu te mai aud" (with Shondy)	2020	Non-album singles
"Am cheltuit averi" (with George Talent)	2021	Non-album singles
"Azi noapte" (with JerryCo)	2021	Non-album singles
"De la început" (with Matteo)	2021	Non-album singles
"Akadele & Trapanele" (with Arkanian)	2021	Roca Roca
"Curaçao" (with Denis)	2021	Roca Roca
"Ma Chérie" (with Deles Trapaneles)	2021	Roca Roca
"Doamne dă-mi puțin noroc" (with Zanni)	2021	Roca Roca
"Fitzoaso" (with Bogdan DLP & Blvck Matias)	2021	Roca Roca
"Adio, Sagapao!" (with Gio)	2021	Roca Roca
"Viteza Ferrari" (with Blvck Matias and Jo Klass)	2022	Roca Roca
"Legenda mafiei" (with Lélé)	2022	
"Cicatricea" (with Omar Arnaout)	2022	

== Awards and nominations ==
=== MTV Europe Music Awards ===
The MTV Europe Music Awards is an event presented by MTV Networks Europe which awards prizes to musicians and performers. In 2007, Velea was nominated for the Best Romanian Act.

Year	Nominee / work	Award	Result	Ref.
2007	Himself	Best Romanian Act	Nominated	

=== Romanian Music Awards ===
The Romanian Music Awards is a yearly major Romanian musical event, awarding the best artists in Romania's music scene. Velea was nominated a total of eight times at five different categories and has won a total of two awards.

Year	Nominee / work	Award	Result	Ref.
2007	Himself	Best Show	Nominated	
2007	Himself	Best Male Artist	Nominated	
2007	Himself	Best New Artist	Nominated	
2010	"Secret, discret" (ft. Puya)	Best Male Artist	Nominated	
2010	"Secret, discret" (ft. Puya)	Best Pop Artist	Won	
2011	"One shot"	Best Male Artist	Nominated	
2012	"Whisper"	Best Male Artist	Nominated	
2012	"Whisper"	Best Pop Artist	Won	
2014	"Din Vina Ta"	Best Male Artist	Won	
2014	"Din Vina Ta"	Best Pop Artist	Nominated	
2014	"Din Vina Ta"	Best Video	Nominated	

=== Radio Romania Music Awards ===
Year	Nominee / work	Award	Result	Ref.
2011	"Don't say it's over"	Best Pop-Dance Song	Nominated	
2011	"Secret"	Best Pop-Dance Album	Nominated	
2011	Himself	Best Pop-Dance Artist	Nominated	
2011	"Minim doi"	Best Pop-Dance Song	Nominated	
2011	Himself	Best Pop-Dance Artist	Nominated	
2011	Himself (with Don Baxter and Smiley)	Best message	Nominated	
2014	Himself (with Smiley)	Best Duet	Nominated	

== Personal life ==
Velea was married to his first wife, Ana Maria between 2010 and 2014. He is currently engaged to fellow singer Antonia Iacobescu since 2021. The couple have two sons, Dominic (born 2014) and Akim (born 2016).
