= Anna Lesko =

Moldovan-Romanian singer (born 1979)

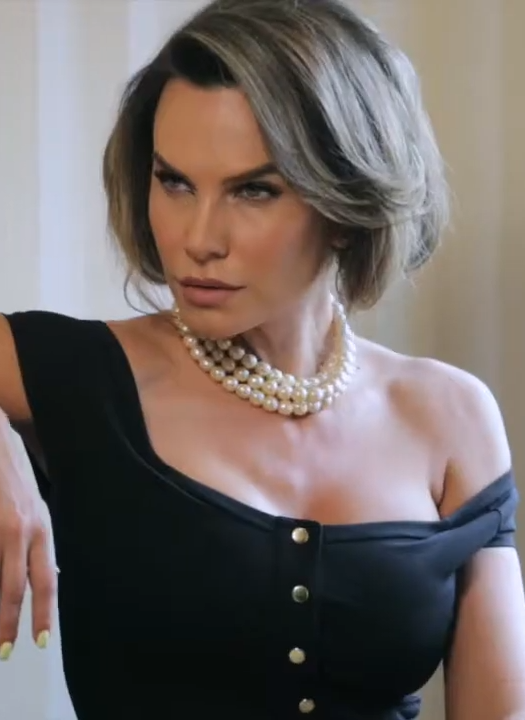
- Lesko in 2018

Background information
- Born: 10 January 1979 (age 47); Chișinău, Moldavian SSR, Soviet Union
- Origin: Romania
- Genres: Pop; Dance; House
- Occupations: Singer, painter
- Instrument: Vocals
- Labels: Cat Music; MediaPro Music
- Website: http://www.annalesko.ro/

Anna Lesko (born Anna Stepanivna Lyzhychko; 10 January 1979) is a Moldovan-Romanian singer. Lesko is of Russian-Ukrainian origin and she lived in Moldova until she was 17 years old, when she moved to Romania, where she has lived ever since. When she was still a minor and dancing in a ballet troupe, she met Irinel Columbeanu, a millionaire businessman who offered to pay for her college. They fell in love despite their 22-year age difference and lived a beautiful love story for 8 years. One of her passions is painting and her creations can be seen on her official website. She started her career as a singer in 2002 with the single "Ard în flăcări" (Burning in Flames) which was included in her first studio album Flăcări (Flames).

In 2003, she released her second studio album, entitled Inseparabili (Inseparable), for which she was rewarded the gold disc in Romania. The third studio album by the artist was Pentru tine (For you), which was released in 2004 with three singles, the most successful being "Nu mai am timp" (I do not have time), written by Bogdan Popoiag and Eduard Alexandru.

In 2013 she released the single "Leagană barca" featuring Pavel Stratan. Lesko's hits reached several times the top positions of Romania's Top 40, with "Anicyka Maya" peaking at number 2 for a month in 2005, beside earning a nomination for "Best Song" at the 2006 MTV Romania Music Awards. Lesko signed with Cat Music in 2007. Upon signing, she released the single "1001 Dorințe", which reached Romania's Top 40. She performed it for the first time at the MTV Romania Music Awards gala the same year. In 2020 she released "Ivanko", featuring Culita Sterp, whose music video surpassed 24 million views on YouTube. Early on in her career she dubbed Sarah's voice in the Romanian dub of the animated movie Treasure Planet (2002).

== Early life ==
Lesko was born on January 10, 1979, in the city of Chișinău in the Republic of Moldova - at that time part of the Soviet Union - into a family of Russian - Ukrainian origins, with her father being half-Moldovan. The singer's father, a construction engineer by profession, is also passionate about music, playing a number of instruments, including accordion or guitar, while her mother inherited the family business, a company producing a range of clothing and footwear. In her childhood, she had problems with her spine and had to exercise frequently. Lesko was passionate about dance, this activity representing the "dream of her life", and joined an ensemble of folk dancers. However, she did not remain in the group very long. She continued to move to this artistic area, but migrated to classical and modern dance, and at the age of seventeen made a trip to Romania, in the company of the ballet band she was part of.

The artist was impressed by the country and began the formalities to be repatriated there. Once this procedure was completed, Lesko learned Romanian in the company of a person who did not know Russian, but this influenced her to move to a legal profession, which would have helped her to integrate more easily in society. At the same time, she began to develop a passion for painting. Lesko entered the Faculty of Law in Bucharest, where she had to face a number of difficulties, most of which were related to the language, but nonetheless she succeeded in completing her studies.

== Musical career ==
In 2000, Lesko decided to focus on a number of music projects, thus beginning to participate in concerts with the band Direcția 5, with which she worked for about a year. Later, in 2002, she started promoting her first single, "Ard în flăcări". It has a dynamic rhythm, Slavic-speaking world influences and some lyrics in Russian. The recording, composed by music producer Marius Moga, benefited from a video - filmed in the presence of director Andreea Păduraru- and a promotion campaign. Păduraru said she was satisfied with her collaboration with Lesko, while also stating that she possessed "acting qualities". The track went on to enter the national Romanian Top 100 at the end of that year, reaching number eighty-two.

In the first part of 2003, the artist's second single, "Inseparabili", premiered. Like its predecessor, it benefited from a video and a promotional campaign, and the release of the eponymous album was also announced. Distribution of the material began on October 28, 2003. To promote the album, the artist began promoting a new single extract, this time choosing the ballad "Innocence" and held a series of concerts, included in a tour. The composition enjoyed success in the Romanian Top 100, where it ranked forty-ninth. About five months after its debut, the album was awarded a gold record for more than 35,000 copies sold, a distinction that was awarded to the Nova Music label artist on the Teo Show by Pro TV. "Inseparabili" was included on the compilation album Sete de distracție, along with hits by artists such as Bere Gratis, Marius Moga and Vank.

=== 2004 - 2005 ===
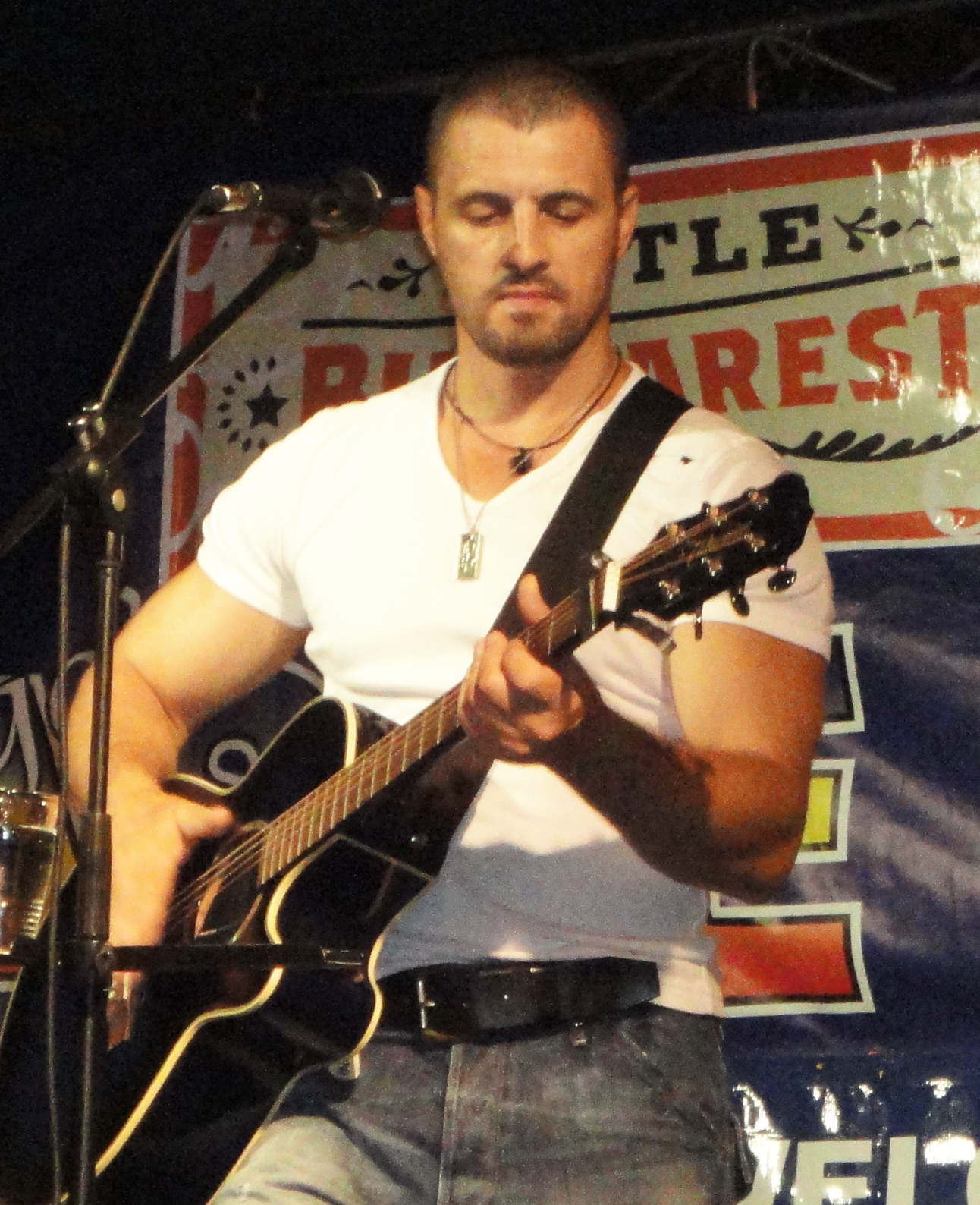
Lesko collaborated with fellow Moldavian singer Pavel Stratan on "Leagană barca" (2013)

In early 2004, Lesko re-entered the recording studio to design a new album. Unlike its predecessors, the new material was influenced by rock music, the singer co-opting the member of the band Direcția 5 and the producer Marian Ionescu, who took care of producing the entire album. The album was composed over a period of about three months, and entitled Pentru tine. It was preceded by the promotion of the single of the same name, which benefited from a video directed by Andreea Păduraru- with which Lesko had already collaborated The music video was inspired by Marilyn Monroe's clothing style, with the artist approaching a retro look. "Pentru tine" didn't fare better than its predecessor, placing only seventy-nine in Romania's Top 100.

Soon, information was released that Lesko had begun preparations for a new video for the song "Nu mai am timp", but it was not present on the list of songs included on the album promoted at that time. The material was filmed in Bucharest, and the clothing used by the soloist was made by herself in collaboration with Ramona Stanca. The recording - a collaboration with Alex. It was subsequently confirmed that the recording would be included on a special edition of the album Pentru tine. The song became the singer's greatest success since her debut, reaching number ten in the Romanian Top 100. The reissued version of the album included a number of additional recordings, including a duet with Cristian Enache, entitled "Să-mi dai curaj să zbor". Another single was released from the album, entitled "Lasă-mă să cred", which was released in the first part of 2005 and whose video premiered in May of the same year. The music video was filmed without the artist being informed of the fact, she was at that time in a photo shoot for the magazine The One. A new national tour, Anna Lesko — Pentru tine, was started to promote the album.

=== 2005 - 2007 ===
At the end of 2005 she started promoting a new studio record product, Ispita, which was preceded by the release of a single extract. The song, entitled "Anicyka Maya", was composed by Laurențiu Duță and contains Russian influences, added at the artist's request. The recording benefited from a video and a promotion campaign, which facilitated its rise in the charts. Shortly after its release, the song climbed to the top 10 in the Romanian Top 100 hierarchy, occupying the second place for a month and becoming the soloist's greatest success in the official Romanian Top 100. The composition received a nomination at the MTV Romania Music Awards 2006, in the category "Best Song". However, the trophy was eventually raised by band Morandi, for the hit "Beijo (Uh la la)". The soloist also gave a recital on the stage at the event, along with artists Akcent, Direcția 5, Proconsul, Paraziții, among others. The album of origin of the hit, Ispita, was released shortly after. The album, which marks a change of musical style for Lesko, was rewarded with a gold record for sales recorded in Romania, more precisely, over 10,000 units sold.

"Anicyka Maya" was the only single promoted from the album, but at the same time, the artist collaborated with band Animal X, recording with them "Ca la început". Despite this, when the singer was asked to take part in the filming of the adjacent video, she informed the members of the band that she was unable to do so. Lesko was subsequently replaced by Corina, with whom the song was re-recorded, the soloist also taking part in the filming of a music video. The band stated in an interview with the bi-monthly publication Bravo that they gave up the project with Lesko because their images did not match. According to the Romanian press, the artist gave up collaborating with Animal X because she was forced by her producer, Laurențiu Duță, against the background of an older conflict between him and the aforementioned band. Șerban Copot, one of the founding members of the group, stated at the end of 2006 that Duță uses the fact that he is a composer and that he forces the singers he works with not to collaborate with Animal X, Lesko being described by Copot as "the tool of a diabolical intrigue". The artist continued with the promotion of a new single extract, "24" - not included in the album Ispita. Launched in maxi single format, the recording benefited from a video, which helped increase its popularity. The composition ranked tenth in the Romanian national chart, becoming the third top 10 success of the soloist in the ranking. During the same period, she sang in the opening event of Heaven's debut album and released DVD CPC Anna Lesko Video Collection, material containing all the videos filmed by the artist up to that point. The recording "24" brought the artist a second nomination at the MTV Romanian Music Awards, in 2007, in the category "Best solo singer", but the trophy was awarded to Andreea Bănică. Lesko also began a short-lived collaboration with Divertis in late 2006, the artist playing a supporting role in the show's series. The soloist appeared in three episodes, for which she filmed for three days, declaring that she was satisfied with her experience.

=== 2007 - present ===
In the first half of 2007, Lesko signed a contract with Cat Music. She soon began promoting the song "1001 Dorințe", which she also performed at the MTV Romanian Music Awards gala. The song debuted in the Romanian Top 100, becoming the artist's fifth top 40 hit in this ranking. The video was made in three months and directed by Bogdan Toader. A year later, in 2008, present on the show Răi da 'Buni, hosted by Mihai Morar, the soloist promoted a series of projects and performed her next single, "Ignoranța", which did not benefit from a video and did not obtain remarkable positions in the official charts in Romania. The song was performed in collaboration with Lesko's frequent collaborator, Laurențiu Duță, as well as with Gabriel Huiban. During the same period, there were reports that the soloist was in the recording studio to release a new album, collaborating with producers Keo, Laurențiu Duță and Gabriel Huiban.

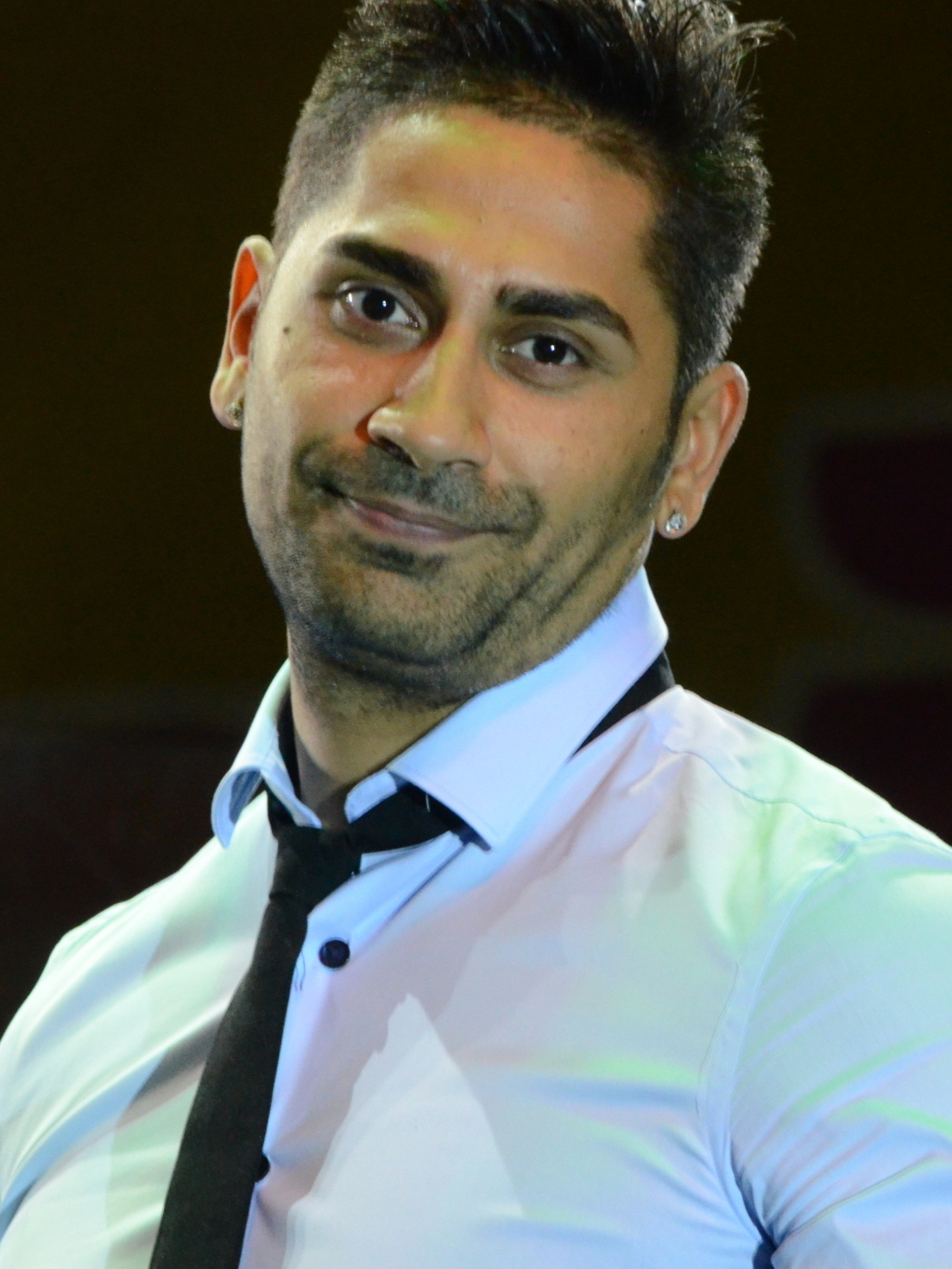
Connect-R collaborated with Lesko on "In My Bedroom" (2010)

Later, she started promoting the song "Balalaika" - written by the artist in collaboration with Claudiu Cota and produced by Angelika Vasilicov and Dan Griober, which was released as the first single excerpt of the upcoming album. The music video - directed by the same Bogdan Toader - takes place in a Soviet military base hidden in a cave under a bombed city. In early 2010, Lesko embarked on a promotional tour with Distanto and soloist Annes. Shortly afterwards, in February 2010, the singer's fifth studio album, entitled Jocul seducției, was released. The disc contains all three pre-released singles - "1001 Dorințe", "Ignoranța" and "Balalaika" - along with other new recordings. The album also features a collaboration with Distanto, a remix of the composition "Russian Love (Katyusha, Ochichiorne, Kalinka)", which is a composition collected from traditional Russian folklore. To increase the album's popularity, the singer began promoting the song "In My Bedroom", composed by Connect-R and Chris Mayer. The recording marks a change of style, with Lesko migrating to the area of dance - house music, being the first song of the English soloist to benefit from the promotion. The album Jocul seducției is a combination of a number of musical styles, including songs performed in Romanian, Russian and English. The video for the hit "In My Bedroom" was directed by Iulian Moga and filmed in the Bucharest club Bamboo, the music video being one of the most anticipated of the summer of 2010. In 2011, she released a new single, entitled "Get it".

== Painting ==
In addition to the success of her musical career, Lesko has dedicated part of her time to painting, an art she is passionate about. The soloist was advised in this field by prominent personalities, including Sabin Bălașa and Mircea Novac. The strongest encouragement to continue on this path came from the painter Sabin Bălașa, who was impressed by her work. The artist's first painting was sold for $5,000. Also, some of the singer's works are exhibited in a gallery of the National Museum of Art of Romania.

== Image ==
Lesko is known for the clothing items she uses in her live performances, which combine a number of elements from Russian folk costume. The clothing displayed by her and the dancers who accompany her on stage and in television shows is made by the artist herself, being helped by professional designers Andreea and Matei Corvin. The works thus produced are completed in the workshop of the two. The singer stated that the passage of time has influenced her clothing style, but "does not feel the need to be inspired by the style of any international star", being satisfied with her "appearance".

In 2008, Lesko participated in a photo session, hosted by FHM Romania magazine, to create a calendar. Other Romanian performers were co-opted for this project, including Elena Gheorghe and Oana Nistor (soloist of the band Activ). Also, in 2010 the soloist was named by Story magazine "the most beautiful star in Romania". Throughout her artistic career, the singer appeared on the covers of magazines such as Bolero, FHM Romania, Ideal Mariaj,, Story and The One. Also, in 2004 alone, the soloist had over twenty appearances on the covers of Romanian publications.

Lesko was also criticized by the Romanian press for the fact that she is not used to giving live recitals, being also blamed by the TV moderator Cătălin Măruță, who (according to 9am.ro) made a series of allusions to the soloist constantly in his shows, to which allegations the singer responded with a statement.

== Personal life ==
The first relationship of the soloist was the one with the businessman Irinel Columbeanu, with whom she lived for eight years. The two met in 1996, following a visit by Lesko to Romania with a dance ensemble. They set out on separate roads in 2004. Regarding the relationship she had, the artist stated that she was very happy with him and loved him very much, which is why they were engaged for eight years, and that it helped her to mature. According to the Romanian press, Lesko also had love affairs with Marian Ionescu, the leader of the musical group Direcția 5, Liviu Moreanu, Codin Maticiuc and Elan Schwartzenberg. Also regarding the constant presence of her private life in Romanian publications, Lesko stated that she was in relationships which much less men than what stated by the press, which connects her constantly with someone. She had a child with her boyfriend, D.J. Vinnie.

== Discography ==
=== Albums ===
- 2002 - Flăcări
- 2003 - Inseparabili
- 2004 - Pentru Tine
- 2006 - Ispita
- 2007 - 24
- 2010 - Jocul Seducţiei

=== Singles ===
- "Ard în Flăcări" (2002)
- "Inseparabili" (2003)
- "Inocenta"
- "Pentru Tine" (2004)
- "Nu Mai Am Timp" (2004)
- "Anicyka Maya" (2005)
- "24"
- "1001 Dorinţe" (2007)
- "Balalaika" (2009)
- "Wake Up" (2011)
- "Go Crazy" (Featuring Gilberto) (2012)
- "Ia-mă" (2012)
- "Leagănă barca" (2013)
- "Foc și scrum" (2014)
- "So Sexy" (Featuring Vova) (2015)
- "Down Down/Habibi" (Featuring Vova) (2015)
- "Ivanko" (Featuring Culita Sterp) (2020)

== Awards and nominations ==
Year	Awards	Category	Recipient(s)	Result	Ref.
2006	MTV Romania Music Awards 2006	Best Song	"Anicyka Maya"	Nominated	
2007	MTV Romania Music Awards 2007	Best Performer	"24"	Nominated	
