= Colors (Morandi song) =

- Remix EP cover

Single by Morandi

from the album Best Of
- Released: 16 June 2009
- Genre: Electropop • electro house • dance-pop • synth-pop
- Length: 4:03
- Label: Universal
- Songwriters: Marius Moga; Andrei Ropcea

Morandi singles chronology
"Save Me" (2008)	"Colors" (2009)	"Rock the World" (2010)

Music video
- "Colors" on YouTube

"Colors" is a song by Romanian group Morandi intended to be the lead single off the group's fourth studio album, Zebra. However, it was later included in their compilation album, Best Of (2011). The supposed Zebra's mix of club and British rock served as inspiration for the track. Written by the group, the song was first released on 16 June 2009 in Romania and on 6 August 2009 for digital download and streaming in the United States through Universal Music Romania.

Commercially, the song topped the charts in the Commonwealth of Independent States (CIS), Slovakia and Ukraine, and reached the top five in Bulgaria and the Czech Republic. A music video directed by Marius Moga and Giuliano Bekor was released to promote the song, which premiered on Romanian radio station Radio 21's website and was aired on MTV in late September 2009. The song was nominated at the 2010 Balkan Music Awards and at the 2010 Radio România Actualităţi Awards for Best Song from Romania and Best Pop/Dance Song, respectively. The video also received a nomination in the former ceremony for Best Video in the Balkans 2009.

== Background and release ==
In an interview with MTV Romania, the group stated that following the success of their third studio album, N3XT (2007), they were busy touring and admitted that they did not have time to record new material. Following the release of "Save Me" (2008), they began working on their new album, titled Zebra, which would include two types of songs, those "written for club[s]" and the others would have British rock influences. According to member Marius Moga, the inclusion of the two different music genres acted like an antithesis, which was the inspiration behind "Colors". Moga and Andrei Ropcea wrote the song.

On 12 June 2009, Urban.ro reported that filming for the music video would commence soon, and the song was confirmed to be the lead single off Zebra. "Colors" was first released on 16 June 2009 in Romania. On 6 August 2009, the song was released via digital download and streaming in the United States by Universal Music Romania. A remix extended play was also issued in the same year in various territories. The track was later included in their compilation album Best Of (2011).

== Reception ==
Commercially, "Colors" reached the summit in the Commonwealth of Independent States (CIS) and Slovakia, spending three consecutive weeks atop the chart in the latter. It peaked at number four in both Bulgaria and Czech Republic. On the native Romanian Top 100, the song debuted and peaked at number 32. It also peaked at number eight on Media Forest's Romania Radio Airplay. At the 2010 Balkan Music Awards the song was nominated for Best Song from Romania, but lost to Akcent's "That's My Name" (2009). It also received a nomination at the 2010 Radio România Actualităţi Awards for Best Pop/Dance Song.

== Promotion ==
The music video was filmed on 15 June 2009 in Buftea Studios and was directed by Moga and American photographer Giuliano Bekor. It premiered on Romanian radio station Radio 21's website on 29 September and started being broadcast on MTV the next day. The music video was an MTV exclusive until October 6. It begins with Ropcea and a woman rising from water and walking towards each other. They are shown holding each other while backgrounds change behind them and Ropcea is depicted singing intermittently with smoke floating beneath him. Thereafter, Moga starts singing underneath the water surface. The visual pans back to Ropcea's previous pose and he is then shown next to the woman inside a flaming square. Interspersed scenes throughout the video portray Moga flying in front of various backgrounds, the group's members being splashed by paint and musical instruments being submerged underwater. The video ends with the woman going down into the water and the word zebra appearing briefly from flames above her. The music video was nominated at the 2010 Balkan Music Awards for Best Video. On 15 October 2009, Morandi performed the song alongside "Angels" at the Slovak Musiq1 Awards. They performed "Colors" along with other tracks at Greek television network MAD TV on 22 October 2009.

== Track listing ==
- Digital download
1. "Colors" – 4:03
- Remix EP
1. "Colors" – 4:00
2. "Colors (Gojira Remix)" – 5:15
3. "Colors (OK Corral Spectrum Vocal)" – 6:43
4. "Colors (OK Corral Spectrum Radio Edit)" – 3:41

== Charts ==
=== Weekly charts ===
2009 weekly chart performance for "Colors"
Chart (2009)	Peak position
Bulgaria Airplay (BAMP)	4
CIS Airplay (TopHit)	1
Czech Republic Airplay (ČNS IFPI)	4
Romania Airplay (Romanian Top 100)	32
Romania Airplay (Media Forest)	8
Romania TV Airplay (Media Forest)	5
Russia Airplay (TopHit)	1
Slovakia Airplay (ČNS IFPI)	1
Ukraine Airplay (TopHit)	1

2010 weekly chart performance for "Colors"
Chart (2010)	Peak position
CIS Airplay (TopHit)	17
Czech Republic Airplay (ČNS IFPI)	13
Russia Airplay (TopHit)	28
Slovakia Airplay (ČNS IFPI)	6
Ukraine Airplay (TopHit)	1

2011 weekly chart performance for "Colors"
Chart (2011)	Peak position
CIS Airplay (TopHit)	82
Russia Airplay (TopHit)	78
Ukraine Airplay (TopHit)	152

2012 weekly chart performance for "Colors"
Chart (2012)	Peak position
Ukraine Airplay (TopHit)	104

2016 weekly chart performance for "Colors"
Chart (2016)	Peak position
Ukraine Airplay (TopHit)	151

2017 weekly chart performance for "Colors"
Chart (2017)	Peak position
Ukraine Airplay (TopHit)	184

=== Monthly charts ===
2009 monthly chart performance for "Colors"
Chart (2009)	Peak position
CIS Airplay (TopHit)	1
Russia Airplay (TopHit)	1
Ukraine Airplay (TopHit)	2

2010 monthly chart performance for "Colors"
Chart (2010)	Peak position
CIS Airplay (TopHit)	23
Russia Airplay (TopHit)	42
Ukraine Airplay (TopHit)	2

2011 monthly chart performance for "Colors"
Chart (2011)	Peak position
CIS Airplay (TopHit)	97
Russia Airplay (TopHit)	93

=== Year-end charts ===
2009 year-end chart performance for "Colors"
Chart (2009)	Position
CIS Airplay (TopHit)	12
Romania (Media Forest)	10
Russia Airplay (TopHit)	10
Ukraine Airplay (TopHit)	76

2010 year-end chart performance for "Colors"
Chart (2010)	Position
CIS Airplay (TopHit)	68
Romania (Media Forest)	70
Russia Airplay (TopHit)	77
Ukraine Airplay (TopHit)	34

=== Decade-end charts ===
Decade-end chart performance for "Colors"
Chart (2000–2009)	Position
CIS Airplay (TopHit)	82
Russia Airplay (TopHit)	82

== Release history ==
Release dates and formats for "Colors"
Region	Date	Format	Label	Ref.
Romania	16 June 2009	N/A	N/A	
United States	6 August 2009	Digital download; streaming	Universal Music	
Various	2009	Remix EP	Universal Music	
