= Anda Adam =

Romanian singer (born 1980)

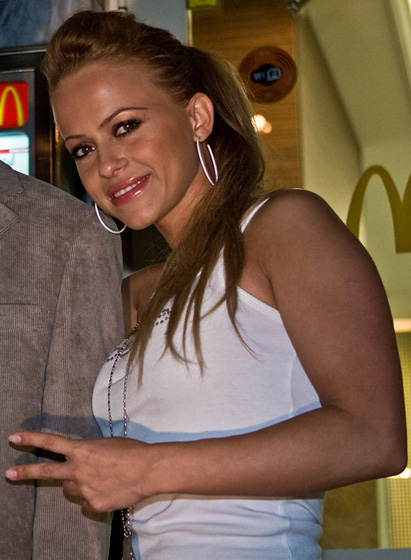

Background information
- Born: Anda Angelica Adam; 27 April 1980 (age 46)
- Origin: Bucharest, Romania
- Genres: House, pop, dance, dubstep, electronic, reggae fusion
- Occupations: Singer, songwriter, model
- Instrument: Vocals
- Years active: 1999–present
- Labels: MediaPro Music, Roton Music
- Website: andaadamofficial.com

Anda Adam (born 27 April 1980) is a Romanian singer and model. She is best known for her singles "My Love on You" and "Panda Madam". Anda began her music career in 1999, after collaborating with Romanian band R.A.C.L.A. on the songs "Nu mă uita" and "Fiesta" for their EP Nu mă uita. This inspired Anda to begin her own music career, releasing her debut EP Ca Între Fete later that year. In 2003, she released her secpmd EP Doar cu tine. Her debut album, Confidențial, was released on 14 April 2005, and featured the successful singles "Ce ți-aș face (Selecta)", "Ajutor", and "Nai, Nai". The album has sold over 20,000 copies in Romania as of 2007, being certified platinum. Her second album, Queen of Hearts, was released in February 2008, featuring the singles "Punani", and "Sufletul Meu", which became one of the most played songs on the radio back then. Her single "My Love On You" was released on 26 November 2009, which became the singer's biggest hit, reaching number one on Turkey and seven in Romania. Her third studio album, AMO was released in September 2013. The album featured singles that charted in both Romania and Turkey, such as "My Love On You", "Panda Madam", "Feel", "Show Me", "Say Goodbye", and many others.

In 2018 the artist was chosen by Walt Disney Pictures Romania to sing the main theme from the movie Kronk's New Groove.

== Discography ==
=== Studio albums ===
Title	Notes	Sales	Certifications
Confidențial	Released: 14 April 2005; Format: CD, cassette; Label: Roton	RO: 20,000	UFPR: Platinum
Queen of Hearts	Released: 1 February 2009; Format: CD; Label: MediaPro		
AMO	Released: 24 September 2013; Format: CD; Label: Roton		

=== EPs ===
Title	Notes
Nu mă uita (with R.A.C.L.A.)	Released: 5 May 1999; Format: Cassette; Label: A&A Records
Ca Între Fete	Released: 1999; Format: Cassette; Label: A&A Records
Doar cu tine	Released: 23 August 2003; Format: CD; Label: MediaPro

=== Singles ===
As lead artist

Title	Year	Peak chart positions		Album
Title	Year	RO	TUR	Album
"Nu mă uita" (with band R.A.C.L.A.)	1999	—	—	Nu mă uita
"Ca Între Fete" (ft. Marijuana)	1999	—	—	Ca Între Fete
"Ce ți-aș face (Selecta)" (Note: "Ce ți-aș face (Selecta)" was also featured on the album AMO.) (ft. Alex Velea)	2005	2	—	Confidențial
"Ajutor"	2006	3	—	Confidențial
"Nai, Nai"	2006	—	—	Confidențial
"Ochii Mei"	2006	—	—	Confidențial
"Punani"	2008	52	—	Queen of Hearts
"Sufletul meu"	2009	—	—	Queen of Hearts
"My Love on You" (Note: "My Love On You" was re-released in 2012 under the title "Love On You".)	2009	—	—	AMO
"Surrender" (ft. Connect-R)	2010	—	—	Non-album singles
"Cadillac"	2010	—	—	AMO
"Show Me" (ft. DDY)	2010	—	—	AMO
"Trust"	2011	—	—	AMO
"Panda Madam"	2012	26	3	AMO
"Feel"	2012	—	—	AMO
"Say Goodbye"	2012	35	—	AMO
"Amo"	2013	10	—	AMO
"Dacă ar fi"	2013	—	—	AMO
"Poate Fata" (Note: "Poate Fata", "Got Your Back", and "Para Siempre" are all the same song with lyrics in Romanian, English and Spanish respectively. However, "Para Siempre" also has English lyrics from "Got Your Back".)	2014	—	—	Non-album singles
"Gloanțe Oarbe"	2014	—	—	Non-album singles
"Got Your Back"	2014	—	—	Non-album singles
"Seri de Mai" (ft. CRBL)	2015	—	—	Non-album singles
"Nu te-am uitat" (Note: "Nu te-am uitat" is a continuation of the 1999 single "Nu mă uita", released for the single's 16-year anniversary) (with band R.A.C.L.A.)	2015	—	—	Non-album singles
"Moşu' E Român" (with GEORGE, Lora, What's UP)	2015	70	—	Non-album singles
"Save Me Tonight"	2015	—	—	Non-album singles
"Para Siempre"	2015	—	—	Non-album singles
"Străina"	2016	—	—	Non-album singles
"Am Chef"	2016	— (Note: It is unknown whether the song charted.)	—	Non-album singles
"Rendez-vous"	2017	72	—	Non-album singles
"Mărul lui Adam" (ft. What's UP)	2017	23	—	Non-album singles
"In altă lume"	2018	39	—	Non-album singles
"Nicio Regulă" (ft. Alex Velea)	2018	42	—	Non-album singles
"Mă inebuneste"	2018	25	—	Non-album singles
"Catch Me"	2019	43	—	Non-album singles
"Miami" (ft. Dorian Popa)	2019	33	—	Non-album singles
"Americana"	2019	—	—	Non-album singles
"Work It"	2020	—	—	Non-album singles

=== As featured artist ===
- Madam
- Can U Feel Love
- World moves on
- Forever young
- Wanna love you
- My way
- Să Înceapă Gălăgia!
- King
- La Pachanga
- Diva

She has charted in Romania with several songs in recent years:

- My Love on You – #27 in 2010
- Madam (with Sasha Lopez) – No. 85 in 2010
- Can U Feel Love (with Kourosh Tazmini) – No. 75 in 2012
- Amo – No. 46 in 2013
- Dacă ar fi – No. 59 in 2013
- Seri de mai (with C.R.B.L.) – No. 59 in 2015

== Honors and awards ==
- Romanian Music Awards: Best Performance (win), Best Female (nominee), Best Pop (nominee): 2010
