= Snow, Tea and Love =

- Theatrical release poster
- Directed by: Cătălin Bugean
- Written by: Andreas Petrescu
- Produced by: Claudiu Boboc; Cătălin Bugean; Tiberiu Ioana; Liviu Varciu
- Starring: Alecsandra Timofte Revnic; Alex Velea; Alina Pușcaș; Anca Dinicu; Andreas Petrescu; Angel Popescu; Carmen Tănase; Cătălin Bugean; Cosmin Seleși; Cristian Iacob; Dan Negru; Dorian Popa; Dragos Dumitru; Florin Busuioc; Ioana Mihail Tiberiu; Iuliana Luciu; Levent Sali; Liviu Vârciu; Marin Barbu; Monica Anghel; Paula Chirilă; Pepe; Raluka; Sergiu Costache; Sorin Bontea
- Cinematography: Padure Danut
- Production company: Zolit Film
- Distributed by: Vertical Entertainment
- Release date: September 10, 2021
- Running time: 115 minutes
- Country: Romania
- Language: Romanian
- Budget: €400.000
- Box office: $391,745

Snow, Tea and Love (Romanian: Zăpadă, Ceai și Dragoste) is a 2021 Romanian science fiction comedy film directed by Cătălin Bugean and written by Andreas Petrescu. It is the first science fiction comedy film production made in the country. Starring Alecsandra Timofte Revnic, Alex Velea, Alina Pușcău, Anca Dinicu, Andreas Petrescu, Angel Popescu, Carmen Tănase, Cătălin Bugean, Cosmin Seleși, Cristian Iacob, Dan Negru, Dorian Popa, Dragos Dumitru, Florin Busuioc, Ioana Mihail Tiberiu, Iuliana Luciu, Levent Sali, Liviu Vârciu, Marin Barbu, Monica Anghel, Paula Chirilă, Pepe, Raluka, Sergiu Costache and Sorin Bontea.

== Synopsis ==
Three friends who, due to a less fortunate situation, end up in jail. There they plan their escape and with the help of a local mobster they manage to escape only to prepare the next robbery. But a potion with really strange consequences falls into his hands and everything gets complicated. Also at stake is a giant diamond valued at $20 million.

== Cast ==
- Alecsandra Timofte Revnic
- Alex Velea
- Alina Pușcău
- Anca Dinicu
- Andreas Petrescu
- Angel Popescu
- Carmen Tănase
- Cătălin Bugean
- Cosmin Seleși
- Cristian Iacob as Marian
- Dan Negru
- Dorian Popa
- Dragos Dumitru
- Florin Busuioc
- Ioana Mihail Tiberiu
- Iuliana Luciu
- Levent Sali as Ceai
- Liviu Vârciu as Dragoste
- Marin Barbu
- Monica Anghel
- Paula Chirilă
- Raluka
- Sergiu Costache
- Sorin Bontea

== Release ==
Snow, Tea and Love was scheduled to be released on March 27, 2020, in Romanian theaters, but was delayed due to the COVID-19 pandemic. Finally, it was released on September 10, 2021, in Romanian cinemas.
