= Poverty in Romania =

Poverty in Romania refers to the percentage of the population of Romania that is considered to be living in poverty under various measures of poverty.

The Romanian government defines "poverty" as an income less than 60% of the national median. In 2017, 23.6% of the population, or 4.6 million people, were affected by poverty. The poverty rates varied by age, with 32.2% for those aged 0-17 and 19.2% for those aged 50-64. Among the development regions, Nord-Est and Sud-Vest had the highest poverty rates (33.4%), while București - Ilfov had the lowest (6.1%). The poorest Romanian counties, as of 2024, were Vaslui, Botoșani and Giurgiu.

== Poverty among the Roma minority ==
Romani people in Romania represent 3.4% of the total population of Romania, according to the 2021 census, although the real numbers may be higher. In 2014, 70% of the Roma minority were at risk of living in poverty.

== Rural poverty ==
Rural poverty is common in Romania. In many rural areas, access to modern infrastructure is precarious. Romania continues to struggle with providing modern sanitation in rural areas. In many rural areas, people still rely on traditional facilities, such as water wells and pit latrines, rather than modern systems of sanitation, although in recent years the situation has improved. As of 2025, 78.2% of Romania's residents were connected to the public water supply network, and, as of 2025, 61.1% of Romania's residents were connected to wastewater collecting systems and 60.1% were connected to wastewater treatment plants. In recent years, people who live in areas where they do not have access to public sewage infrastructure are increasingly using onsite sewage facilities, such as septic tanks. Nevertheless, Romania has the highest percentage in the European Union of people not having indoor flushing toilets, at 15.4%, as of 2023. However, this percentage has fallen rapidly throughout the years, especially after Romania joined the EU in 2007; in 2012 the percentage was 36.8%.

Lack of adequate access to education in rural areas is also a problem, contributing to the cycle of poverty. About 16% of children aged 7–10 and 25% of children aged 11–14 from rural areas do not attend school, according to Save the Children. The situation becomes even worse after eighth grade (the last grade of middle school corresponding to age 14–15) because children must change schools to go to high school, and many villages do not have high schools, and therefore parents must make arrangements for their children to commute to the nearest locality or for the children to move there, which can be difficult, and as a result many rural children abandon school (despite the fact that education is compulsory until twelfth grade). In one study, a third of rural school children said they planned to drop out of school after eighth grade.
