= Anicyka Maya =

Single by Anna Lesko

from the album Ispita
- Released: March 2006
- Recorded: 2005
- Genre: Pop
- Length: 3:15
- Label: ROTON / Kat Music

Anna Lesko singles chronology
"Mambo" (2005)	"Anicyka Maya" (2006)	"24" (2006)

"Anicyka Maya" is a single by Romanian singer Anna Lesko. It was released in Romania, Moldova, Ukraine, Russia, Armenia, Georgia, Belarus, Lithuania, Latvia, Estonia and New Zealand.

The single achieved considerable success, reaching the number 2 position on the Romanian Top 100.

== Chart position ==
Chart	Peak position
Romanian Top 100	2

== Track listing ==
1. Anicyka Maya – (3:15)
2. Ispita – (3:00)
3. Nu mă Uita – (3:55)
4. Prima Oară – (2:58)
5. Tot Aşa – (3:02)
