= Don Baxter =

Romanian singer (born 1978)

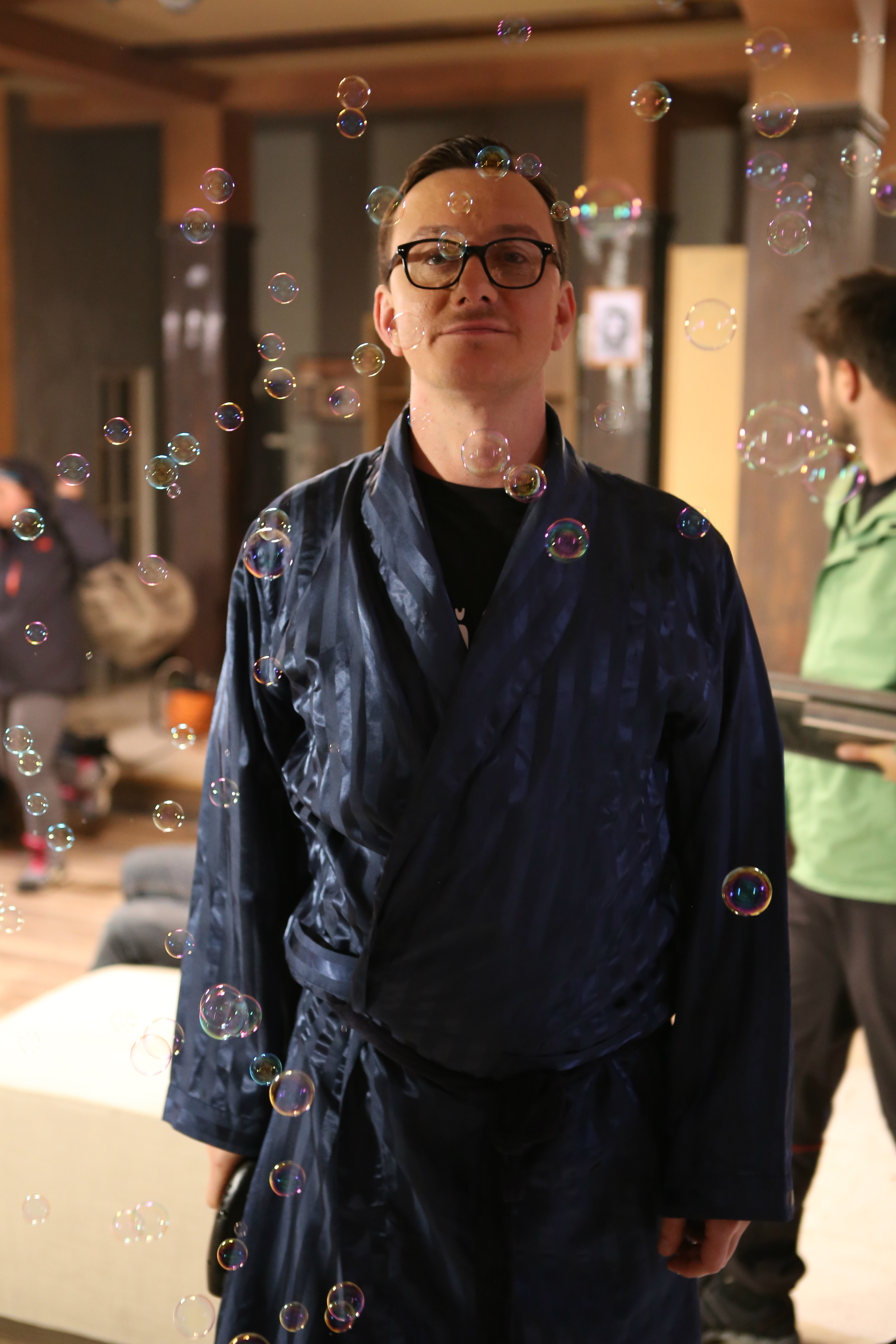
- Baxter in February 2015

Background information
- Born: Costel Sergiu Istrati; 16 June 1978 (age 48); București, Romania
- Genres: Pop; hip hop; rap; dance
- Occupations: Singer; record producer
- Years active: 1994–present
- Label: HaHaHa Production
- Spouse: Teodora Istrati (m. 2018)
- Children: 2

Cornel Sergiu Istrati (Romanian pronunciation: [corˈnelˈ serˈjiuˈ isˈ traˈ ti]; born 16 June 1978) better known by his stage name Don Baxter is a Romanian singer and record producer from București currently signed to the HaHaHa Production label. He is best known for his early years as a rapper in band "Morometzii".

== Biography ==
Istrati was born in 1978 in București. Since his early childhood, he expressed his willing to become an actor, fact which brought him to study theatre and puppet theatre for several years. He stated in an interview that a talented man like him can not do anything but music and so he started singing.

== Musical career ==
=== As a singer (1994–2004) ===
Istrati started his musical career in 1994 with the band "Morometzii" in which he was a founding member alongside Sapro and FreakaDaDisk. They released their debut album "Gânditoruˈ 8294" (The Thinker 8294) in 1997. He wasn't a member of the band for too long, as he decided to pursue a solo career. In 1999, Baxter releases his first solo album entitled "Suspect nr.1" (Suspect number One). The artist claims that the album was not promoted, however he believes that it is one of the top three all-time rap albums in Romania.

=== As a producer and singer (2004–present) ===
In 2004, Istrati started focusing on the production side, releasing his second solo album called "Singur" (Alone). There followed a rather long period in which he was absent from the music scene, an absence mostly attributed to his alcohol addiction.

Istrati is considered one of the biggest hip hop producers in Romania. He has collaborated with various artists such as B.U.G. Mafia, La Familia, Codu’ Penal, Smiley, Simplu, Alex Velea, Corina, Delia Matache, Cătălina Toma and Moni-K. The artist released two albums of his own and a total of 37 hits for other artists and 13 featurings with well-known artists.

In 2013, Istrati collaborated with fellow artist Puya as they released "Bagă bani" (Pay Up), the second single extracted from the E.P. album "Maidanez" (Stray), after several previous collaborations for the singles "Ucigași în serie" (Serial killers) (1996) featuring Puya and B.U.G. Mafia, "Ce mai contează" (What does it matter) featuring Delikt and La Familia (1997, Băieți de cartier L.P.), "Il-Egal" (Illegal or non equal), in collaboration with La Familia (1997, 2 băieți din sud L.P.) and "De pe stradă" (From the streets), in collaboration with La Familia, Codu Penal and 6ase:6ase (2003, official Loop Records compilation).

==== HaHaHa Production (2009–present) ====
Since 2009, Istrati is signed to the HaHaHa Production label founded and owned by Smiley and works both as a producer and performer.

In the fall of 2010, he returned with a new video for the song "Intro (Ce zici?)" (Intro (What do you say?)). It was the first song he has composed alongside HaHaHa Production studios staff with a modern sound system, worthy of a comeback.

In 2011, he released the song "Dan Spătaru", a creation signed HaHaHa Production, in collaboration with Boier Bibescu. The song was released to celebrate half a century since Romanian legacy singer Dan Spătaru's musical debut. It is a tribute song that even used a sample from the famous hit "Mi ai furat inima" of Spătaru.

2012 brought one of the most important collaboration for Istrati, as together with Smiley and Alex Velea, the artist released the single "Cai Verzi pe Pereți" (Green horses on the walls). The song was performed for the first time at the Romanian Music Awards, in Sibiu, where it enjoyed real success. Thus the beginning of a long-term collaboration between the three artists was announced.

In 2014, Istrati collaborated with Mihai Ristea to release the single "Ploaia" (Rain). The single was produced by HaHaHa Production studios and was released alongside partner label Cat Music. Also in 2014, Istrati released the single "Statul" (Sitting) together with Smiley. The video was produced by HaHaHa Video Production and directed by Ionuț Trandafir. Filming took place in the national cinematographic studios of Buftea.

== Other media ==
Istrati made his television debut with his presence in the 2015 season of the MasterChef România cooking show broadcast by Pro TV. After earning their chef aprons, contestants were eliminated one by one during the three weeks in which the show was filmed. Contrary to the expectations of the fans, Istrati made it to the finals of the contest, placing himself third.

== Personal life ==
Istrati married his wife Teodora, a culinary blogger, in 2018. The couple has two children, a boy and a girl.

== Discography ==
=== Studio albums ===
List of studio albums
Title	Album details
Gânditoruˈ 8294 (as part of Morometzii)	Released: 1997; Format: Cassette tape; Label: Amma Record
Suspect No. 1 (featuring Royală Mare)	Released: 1999; Format: Cassette tape, CD; Label: Cat Music
Singur	Released: February 22, 2004; Format: Cassette tape, CD; Label: InterCont Music

=== Singles ===
==== As lead artist ====
List of singles, with selected chart positions
Title	Year	Peak chart positions	Album
Title	Year	ROM	Album
"Dumnezeu Știe" (featuring Cătălina Toma & Royală Mare)	1999	—	Suspect No. 1
"La Prețul Jucătorului" (featuring Royală Mare & Drew)	1999	—	Suspect No. 1
"Înger Pentru O Zi" (featuring Moni-K)	2001	—	Red Dog Music
"Din nou"	2004	—	Singur
"Mama"	2004	—	Singur
"Fac Ce Vreau"	2004	—	Singur
"Noi Toţi"	2004	—	Singur
"O Să Fie Bine"	2004	—	Singur
"Purtător De Cuvânt"	2004	—	Singur
"Tot Ce Trebuie"	2004	—	Singur
"Woof" (featuring ChuCho)	2004	—	Singur
"Ce zici?! (intro)"	2010	—	Non-album singles
"Sincer"	2011	—	Non-album singles
"Bricheta"	2015	—	#MAIMUSIC

==== As featured artist ====
List of singles, with selected chart positions
Title	Year	Peak chart positions	Album
Title	Year	ROM	Album
Viață Bună (La Familia featuring Don Baxter)	2003	—	Punct și de la capăt
"Îmi Place La Tine Tot" (Corina featuring Don Baxter)	2005	—	Îmi place tot
"Soldați" (Codu' Penal featuring Don Baxter, Dizzy, ChuCho & Alecu)	2006	—	Bairam Bagabonțesc
"Am Bani de Dat" (Smiley (featuring Alex Velea, Don Baxter and Marius Moga)	2009	9	În lipsa mea
Dan Spătaru (Boier Bibescu vs. Don Baxter)	2011	—	Non-album singles
"Cai Verzi pe Pereți" (Smiley featuring Don Baxter & Alex Velea)	2012	1	Non-album singles
"Statul" (featuring Smiley featuring Don Baxter)	2014	53	Non-album singles
"Ploaia" (Mihai Ristea featuring Don Baxter)	2014	—	Non-album singles
"Bagă Bani" (Puya featuring Don Baxter and Connect-R)	2013	—	Best Of (Puya)
"Funkin' Around (MMX) (D.O.C. featuring Don Baxter)	2021	—	XL Mixtape
