= Marius Moga =

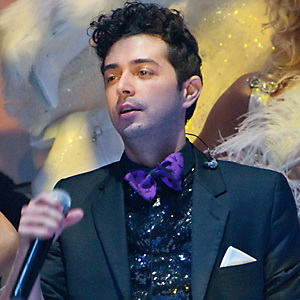
- Moga performing in Russia, 2011
- Born: Marius Ioan Moga; 30 December 1981 (age 44); Alba Iulia, Romania
- Other names: deMoga; Maxi Mo; Socko
- Occupations: Singer; composer; producer; television personality
- Years active: 2001–present
- Spouse: Bianca Lăpuşte (m. 2015)
- Children: 1
- Musical career
- Genres: Pop; R&B; House music
- Instruments: Vocals; piano; keyboards; synthesizer; drums; bass guitar; acoustic guitar; sampler
- Labels: DeMoga Music; Mini Maxi Mo; MOF; Roton
- Formerly of: Morandi
- Website: demoga.com

Marius Moga (Romanian pronunciation: [ˈmarjus ˈmoɡa]) is a Romanian singer, Grammy nominated songwriter and producer and television personality. He writes and produces music in various styles and genres, especially pop, R&B and club music. In 2011, he became the judge and mentor of the reality singing show Vocea României.

In 2003 the artist was chosen by Walt Disney Pictures Romania to sing the main theme from the series Chip 'n Dale: Rescue Rangers.

== Personal life ==
Moga began dating Romanian actress Iulia Vântur in 2007, however the two ended their relationship in February 2009. The couple rekindled their romance later that year but broke up again in 2011. In December 2013, Moga started a relationship with Pro TV news reporter Bianca Lăpuște. The two announced their engagement in November 2014 at Vocea României and were married on 4 July 2015. On 14 October 2015, the couple welcomed their first child, a daughter. As of February 2020, Moga resides with his wife and daughter in Cernica.

== Discography ==
=== As lead artist ===
List of singles as lead artist
Title	Year	Peak chart positions		Album
Title	Year	ROU	MDA TV	Album
"Pe barba mea"	2014	1	14	Non-album singles
"Suntem păsări călătoare" (featuring Achi)	2015	—	—	Non-album singles
"Mă doare la bass" (featuring Shift and What's Up)	2018	40	—	Non-album singles
"Ai grijă de femeia ta" (featuring Smiley)	2019	70	—	Non-album singles
"Vrei să te mint?" (with Lora)	2021	42	—	Non-album singles
"O dorință"	2022	—	—	Non-album singles
"—" denotes a release that did not chart or was not released in that territory.

=== As featured artist ===
List of singles as featured artist
Title	Year	Peak chart positions		Album
Title	Year	ROU	MDA	Album
"Închide ochii" (Cream featuring Marius Moga)	2003	—	—	Aștept...
"Știu ce îți place" (Cream featuring Marius Moga and Matteo)	2007	54	—	48 de ore
"Zoom/Bad Boys vs. Super Girls" (Nevena featuring Marius Moga and NiVo)	2009	—	—	Non-album singles
"Allemasse" (Lukone featuring deMoga)	2011	40	—	Non-album singles
"Tot mai sus" (Guess Who featuring deMoga)	2011	1	8	Tot mai sus
"Electronic Symphony" (Lukone featuring deMoga and Liviu Teodorescu)	2012	—	—	Non-album single
"Sus pe toc" (Shift featuring Marius Moga)	2013	1	—	Adevărul
"Atâta timp cât mă iubești" (Andra featuring Marius Moga)	2013	2	13	Non-album singles
"O facem pentru voi" (YouTube Vloggers featuring Marius Moga)	2015	—	—	Non-album singles
"Toată vara" (Robert Toma featuring Marius Moga)	2015	—	—	Non-album singles
"Teniși" (Ciprenko featuring Marius Moga)	2016	—	—	Non-album singles
"Bate, bate" (Alexandra Ungureanu featuring Marius Moga)	2018	—	—	Non-album singles
"—" denotes a release that did not chart or was not released in that territory.

=== Guest appearances ===
List of guest appearances
Title	Year	Album
"Fără gheață nu e viață" (TNT featuring Marius Moga)	2002	Exploziv
"7 Seconds" (Buppy featuring Marius Moga and Simplu)	2004	Universal Reggae Menu, Vol. 1
"Everything We Do" (Buppy featuring Marius Moga and Don Baxter)	2006	Universal Reggae Menu, Vol. 1
"Where Do You Keep Your Love" (Buppy featuring Marius Moga)	2006	Universal Reggae Menu, Vol. 1
"De ai fi un cântec..." (Smiley featuring Marius Moga)	2008	În lipsa mea
"Come This Way" (Zero featuring Marius Moga)	2009	Sunny Days

== Awards and nominations ==
Marius Moga's awards and nominations
Organization	Year	Nominated work	Category	Result (Note: Awards in certain categories do not have prior nominations and only winners are announced by the jury. For simplification and to avoid errors, each award in this list has been presumed to have had a prior nomination.)	Ref.
100 Greatest Romanians	2006	Marius Moga	—N/a	85th place	
Balkan Music Awards	2010	"Colors"	Best Video in the Balkans	Nominated	
Media Music Awards	2014	Marius Moga	MTV Award	Won	
MTV Romania Music Awards	2003	Marius Moga	Best Male	Won	
Radio România Actualităţi Awards	2006	Marius Moga	Best Songwriter	Nominated	
Radio România Actualităţi Awards	2007	"Falling Asleep"	Best Pop/Dance Song	Nominated	
Radio România Actualităţi Awards	2007	"Oficial îmi merge bine"	Best Pop/Dance Song	Won	
Radio România Actualităţi Awards	2007	Marius Moga	Best Songwriter	Won	
Radio România Actualităţi Awards	2008	N3XT	Best Pop/Dance Album	Nominated	
Radio România Actualităţi Awards	2008	"Afrika"	Best Pop/Dance Song	Nominated	
Radio România Actualităţi Awards	2008	"Când sunt cu tine"	Best Pop/Dance Song	Nominated	
Radio România Actualităţi Awards	2008	Marius Moga	Best Songwriter	Won	
Radio România Actualităţi Awards	2010	"Colors"	Best Pop/Dance Song	Nominated	
Radio România Actualităţi Awards	2013	"Ce e dragostea?"	Best Message	Nominated	
Radio România Actualităţi Awards	2013	"Ce e dragostea?"	Best Pop Song	Nominated	
Radio România Actualităţi Awards	2013	Marius Moga	Best Songwriter	Won	
Radio România Actualităţi Awards	2014	Marius Moga	Best Songwriter	Nominated	
Radio România Actualităţi Awards	2015	"Pe barba mea"	Best Message	Nominated	
Radio România Actualităţi Awards	2015	"Pe barba mea"	Best Pop Song	Nominated	
Radio România Actualităţi Awards	2015	Marius Moga	Best Songwriter	Nominated	
Radio România Actualităţi Awards	2016	"În oglindă"	Best Duo/Group Song	Nominated	
Radio România Actualităţi Awards	2016	"Niciodată să nu spui niciodată"	Best Pop Song	Won	
Radio România Actualităţi Awards	2016	"Niciodată să nu spui niciodată"	Song of the Year	Nominated	
Radio România Actualităţi Awards	2016	Marius Moga	Best Songwriter	Nominated	
Radio România Actualităţi Awards	2016	"Avioane de hârtie"	Best Video	Won	
Romanian Music Awards	2011	"Allemasse"	Best Video	Nominated	
Romanian Music Awards	2012	"Electronic Symphony"	Best Video	Won	
Romanian Music Awards	2014	"Pe barba mea"	Best Male Song	Nominated	
Romanian Music Awards	2014	"Atâta timp cât mă iubeşti"	Best Pop	Nominated	
Romanian Music Awards	2014	"Atâta timp cât mă iubeşti"	Best Song	Nominated	
