= Geamăna =

Geamăna may refer to several places in Romania:

- Geamăna, a village in Bradu Commune, Argeș County
- Geamăna, Alba, a flooded village in Lupșa Commune, Alba County
- Geamăna, a village in Drăgoești Commune, Vâlcea County
- Geamăna, a village in Stoilești Commune, Vâlcea County
- Geamăna, a right tributary of the Homorod near Dumbrăvița, Brașov County
- Geamăna, a left tributary of the Homorod near Satu Nou, Brașov County
- Geamăna, a tributary of the Tazlău in Neamț County
- Geamăna (Olt), a tributary of the Olt in Vâlcea County

and a village in Moldova:

- Geamăna, Anenii Noi, a commune in Anenii Noi district
