= Bolovan =

Romanian river

- Location within Romania

Location
- Country: Romania
- Counties: Olt, Vâlcea
- Villages: Vulpești, Donești

Physical characteristics
- Mouth: Geamăna
  - coordinates: 44.7939°N 24.2989°E
- Length: 10 km (6.2 mi)
- Basin size: 16 km^{2} (6.2 sq mi)

Basin features
- Progression: Geamăna→ Olt→ Danube→ Black Sea
- River code: VIII.1.156.2

The Bolovan is a left tributary of the river Geamăna in Romania. It flows into the Geamăna in the village Geamăna. Its length is 10 km (6.2 mi) and its basin size is 16 km^{2} (6.2 sq mi).
