= Felicia Donceanu =

Romanian sculptor and painter (1931–2022)

- Born: 28 January 1931; Bacău, Romania
- Died: 21 January 2022 (aged 90); Drăgoești, Romania
- Resting place: Bellu Cemetery

Felicia Donceanu (28 January 1931 – 21 January 2022) was a Romanian painter, sculptor, pianist and composer. She composed works that were performed internationally, and was particularly noted for her harp compositions and choral works. Donceanu was awarded the Romanian Academy George Enescu Prize in 1984.

== Life and career ==
Donceanu was born in Bacău on 28 January 1931. She originally planned to be a stage director, but became interested in music and studied composition at the Ciprian Porumbescu Conservatory in Bucharest (now the National University of Music) with Mihail Jora. She also studied harmony with Paul Constantinescu, theory and solfege with Ioan Chirescu, and orchestration with Theodor Rogalski. She also studied piano with Eugenia Ionescu. After completing her studies in 1956, she worked as an editor for ESPLA until 1958, and then for Editura Muzicala in Bucharest until 1966. After leaving her editorial position, she worked full-time as a composer, producing works that have been performed internationally. She is a member of the Romanian Composers' Union, and has won their composition prize a number of times. Donceanu performed on radio, and also given radio lectures.

Donceanu composed incidental music for plays by Thornton Wilder, Moliere and Shakespeare, among others. She was particularly noted for her harp compositions and choral works. According to Viorel Cosma, Donceanu "delights in mixing the timbres of old and modern instruments...to produce light, sonorous works with a truly Romanian spirit." She also painted and sculpted.

She was married to the poet Alexandru Voitin. Donceanu died in Drăgoești on 21 January 2022, at the age of 90.

== Honors and awards ==
- Honorable mention, International Composition Competition in Mannheim, 1961
- Romanian Union of Composers’ prize in 1984, 1984?, 1986, 1988, 1993, 1996, and 1997
- Order of Cultural Merit, 1981
- Romanian Academy George Enescu prize, 1984

== Works ==
Donceanu composed for stage plays and instrumental ensemble, but focused mostly on chamber works. Her music is influenced by Romanian folk music, sometimes featuring traditional folk instruments. Selected works include:

- Arie de Concert (1973) for baritone and orchestra
- Măiastra (1973) for soprano, chorus, and string orchestra
- Picolicomando (1984) for tenor, children's chorus, organ, violin, and percussion
- Yolanda (1993) for soprano and orchestra
- Rugăciunea Domnească (1992) for voice, string orchestra, and percussion
- Rugăciunea Domnească (1998) for male chorus, string orchestra, and percussion
- Invocatio (1999) with Biblical texts and fragments of verses by Ovid, scored for soprano, piano, violin, and chamber orchestra
- Clopote la soroc (1999) a cantata for SATB chorus and orchestra
- Retro-Tango, for bassoon ensemble
- Inscription on a Mast for harp
- Odinioară, song-cycle for mezzo-soprano and piano
- Mărgele (Beads) (1962) four songs to verses by Tudor Arghezi
- Trei Cântece pentru Til (1964) to verses by George Călinescu
- Dor I for contralto
- Dor II for contralto
- Imagini pe versuri de Eminescu (Pictures on Verses of Eminescu) (1963–1965) for soprano
- Cu Penetul (With Plumage)
- Mărturisiri (Confessions), cycle of five songs for bass-baritone to poems by Alexandru Voitin, from 1975 to 1978 and 1986
- Cântece de fată frumoasă
- Cântând cu Ienăchiţă Văcărescu
- Sincron
- Ponti Euxini Clepsydra (1971) for soprano, clarinet, oboe, percussion, and harp
- Mai sunt încă roze (1972), to texts by Macedonski, is a five-song work for soprano and instrumental ensemble
- Two Serenades (1973) for baritone, flute, and harp, to verses by Baconski
- Cântece de fată frumoasă (1976) three-movement work for mezzo-soprano, English horn, and marimba
- Cântând cu Ienăchiţă Văcărescu (1983) for soprano, lute, viola da gamba, flute, harpsichord, and percussion, text from Ienăchiţă Văcărescu
- Abţibilder după Tristan Tzara (1996) semi-staged work for soprano, harpsichord, and two viola da gamba
- Cutia cu surprise … şi pentru oameni încrutaţi (The Box with Surprises) (1998) for soprano, two viola da gamba, harpsichord, piano, and puppets
- Tablouri vivante (Living Tableaux) (1999), for voice and instruments

Her work has been recorded and issued on CD, including:

- Polhymnia – Sacrée et Profane
