= Dejeasca =

- Location within Romania

Location
- Country: Romania
- Counties: Olt, Vâlcea
- Villages: Dejești

Physical characteristics
- Mouth: Geamăna
  - location: Geamăna
  - coordinates: 44.8082°N 24.3057°E
- Length: 13 km (8.1 mi)
- Basin size: 20 km^{2} (7.7 sq mi)

Basin features
- Progression: Geamăna→ Olt→ Danube→ Black Sea
- River code: VIII.1.156.1

The Dejeasca is a left tributary of the river Geamăna in Romania. It flows into the Geamăna in the village Geamăna. Its length is 13 km (8.1 mi) and its basin size is 20 km^{2} (7.7 sq mi).
