= Bolovan (disambiguation) =

Bolovan may refer to the following rivers in Romania:

- Bolovan, a tributary of the Ilva in Bistrița-Năsăud County
- Bolovan, a tributary of the Budac in Bistrița-Năsăud County
- Bolovan, a tributary of the Geamăna in Olt and Vâlcea Counties

== See also ==
- Bolovăniș (disambiguation)
- Bolovani, a village in Dâmbovița County, Romania
