= Transilvania University of Brașov =

Education and research institution in Romania

- Universitatea Transilvania din Brașov
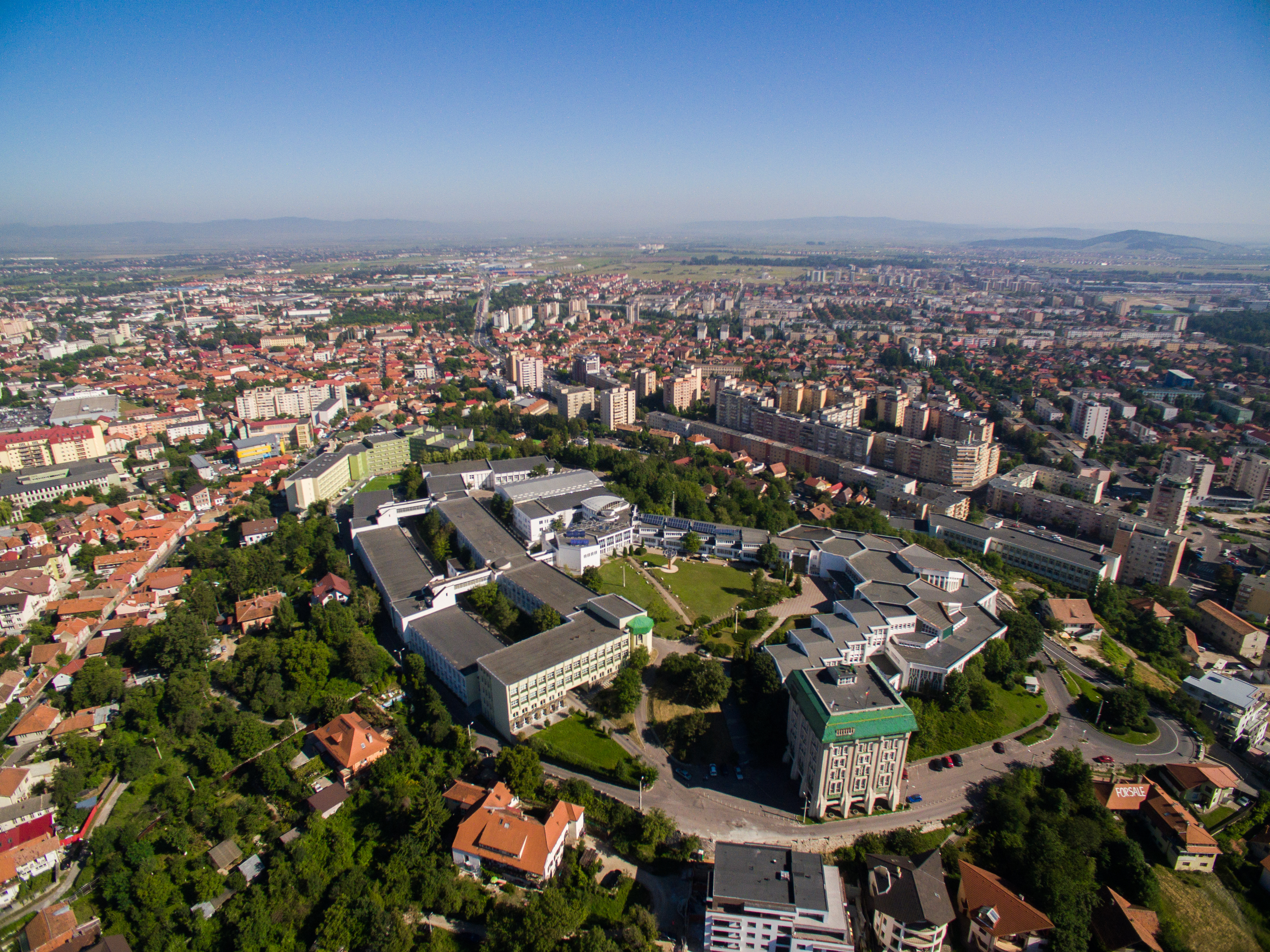
- Motto: Learn to be central!
- Type: Public
- Established: 1948/1971
- Budget: €67,377,017
- Rector: Ioan Vasile Abrudan
- Academic staff: 710 full-time teaching staff and 57 researchers (7 full-time and 50 short-term)
- Administrative staff: 344
- Total staff: 1352
- Students: 20,885
- Undergraduates: 17,200
- Postgraduates: 3,218
- Doctoral students: 540
- Location: Brașov, Romania; 45°39′21″N 25°34′50″E
- Campus: Urban
- Website: www.unitbv.ro
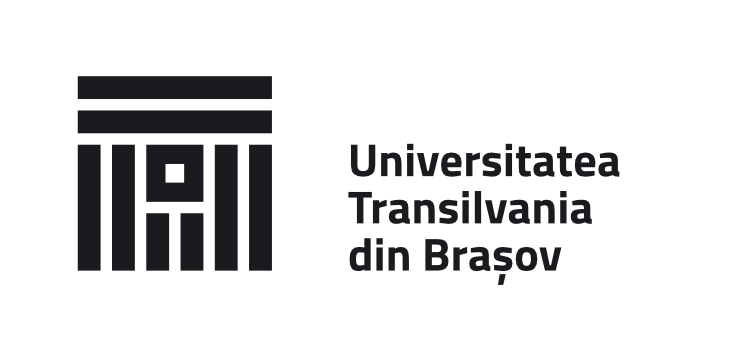

University rankings

Regional – Overall
- QS Emerging Europe and Central Asia: 156 (2022)

Transilvania University of Brașov (Romanian: Universitatea Transilvania din Brașov; UNITBV, also stylised UniTBv) is a higher education and research institution in Brașov, Romania which comprises 18 faculties, with a number of over 20,880 students and over 700 teaching staff members. Currently, Transilvania University of Brașov is the largest university in the centre of the country, a university that offers programmes in fields such as: mechanical engineering, industrial engineering, computers, construction, forestry, wood engineering, product design, nutrition and tourism, computer science, mathematics, economics, medicine, pedagogy, music, literature and linguistics, law, sociology and social work, psychology. There are 98 undergraduate programmes in the University: 81 full-time study programmes, 17 part-time study and distance learning programmes, 66 master's degree study programmes (63 full-time and 3 part-time) and 22 doctoral fields (full-time and part-time).

The involvement of Transilvania University of Brasov in the European University Alliance UNITA and the launch in November 2023 of a 14 million euro project, funded by the European Commission, marks an important step in the integration of the institution in the European academic space. This project facilitates the participation of students and teaching staff in academic mobility, joint study and research programs and international collaborations. The European funding also contributes to the improvement of the educational infrastructure and resources, with a positive impact on the quality of teaching and research at the university.

== History ==
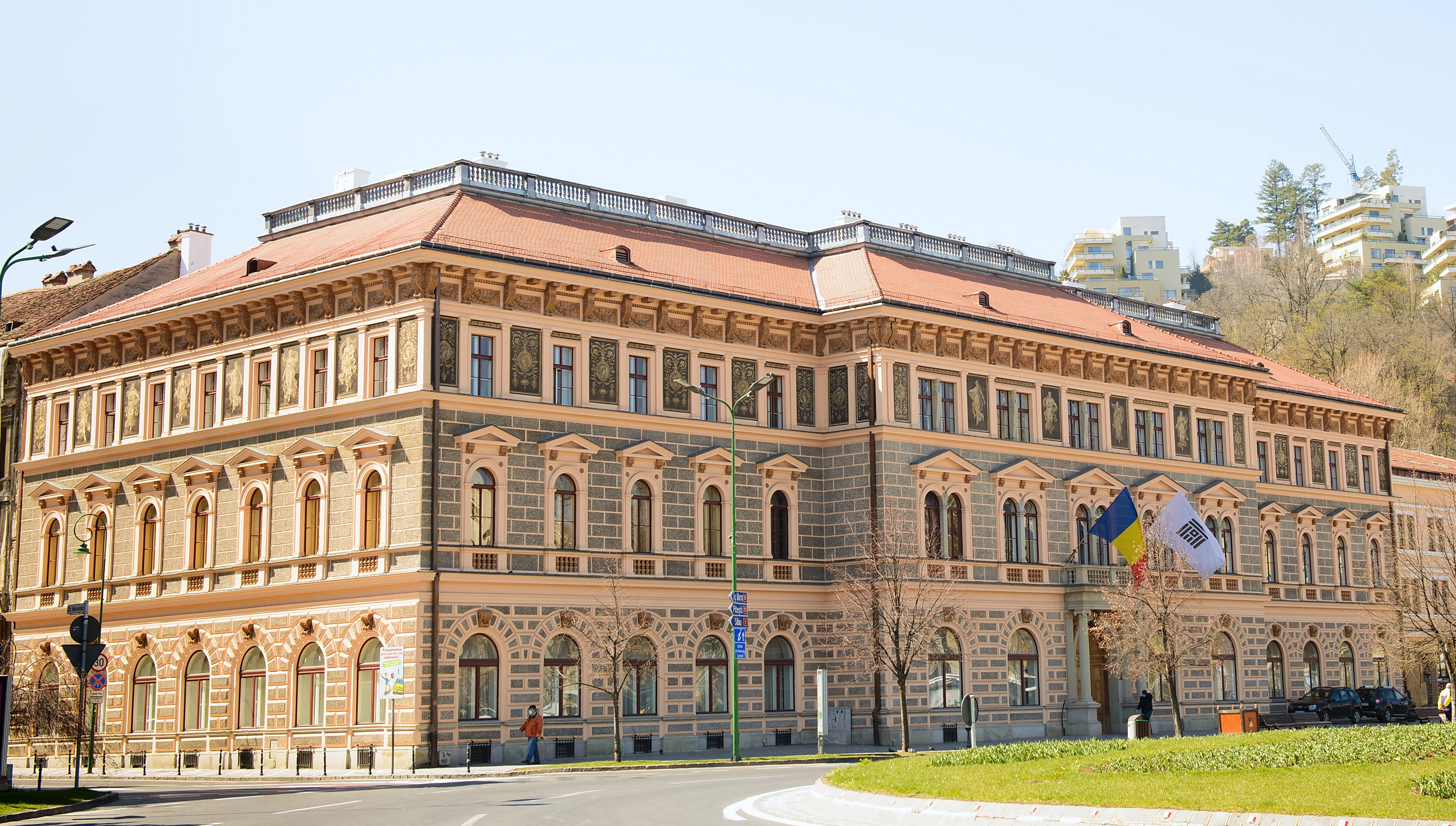
Administrative building

The foundations of higher education in Brașov were laid in 1948, when the Institute of Silviculture was founded. In 1949, the Institute of Mechanics was established, and in 1953, the Institute of Silviculture became the Forestry Institute. The two institutes fused into the Polytechnic Institute of Brașov. In 1959 the Department of Wood Industry and in 1964 the Manufacturing Technologies Department were founded within the Polytechnic Institute. In 1960, the Pedagogic Institute (Mathematics, Physics-Chemistry, Biology) came into being in Brașov, followed by the Department of Music in 1969. In 1964, the Department of Manufacturing Technologies was founded within the Polytechnic Institute. In 1971, the Polytechnic Institute and the Pedagogic Institute merged to create the University of Braşov. The University's structure as approved by a Council of Ministers Decision of October 15, 1971 comprised eight faculties: Faculty of Mechanical Engineering, Faculty of Manufacturing Engineering, Faculty of Forestry, Faculty of Wood Industry, Faculty of Mathematics and Computer Science, Faculty of Physics–Chemistry, Faculty of Natural and Agricultural Sciences, and the Faculty of Music. In 1991, the University was renamed as Transilvania University of Brașov, at the University Senate's request and according to the Government Decision of January 4, 1991 and the Order of the Ministry of Education and Science of March 22, 1991.

The academic year 1990–1991 marked the establishment of several other faculties: Faculty of Electrical Engineering, Faculty of Music, Faculty of Sciences, and Faculty of Economic Sciences, and a few other educational units were set up the following year: the Faculty of Medicine and two academic colleges, one of Forestry and another of Economics and Computer Science.

In 1995, the Department of Psychology – Pedagogy – Teaching Methodology, on the structure of which the University Pedagogical Seminar was established, became the Department of Teaching Staff Training, and the Faculty of Machine Building Technology was divided into: The Faculty of Technological Engineering and the Faculty of Materials Science and Engineering.

In 1998, the "Local contact point in the field of Distance Learning", within the network of Distance Learning Study Centres and created through the PHARE programme, became the Department for Distance Learning, which in 2005 changed its name to the Centre for Distance Learning and Part-time Studies.

In 2001, the Faculty of Electrical Engineering expanded its array of specializations, thus having its name changed to the Faculty of Electrical Engineering and Computer Science.

In 2002, the Faculty of Law and Sociology emerged from the Faculty of Economics, and the Faculty of Sciences divided into three faculties: The Faculty of Mathematics-Informatics, the Faculty of Letters and the Faculty of Sports and Physical Education. The Pedagogical and Philological University College and the Medical University College were established in the same year.

In 2003, the Faculty of Civil Engineering was created from the Faculty of Silviculture, and the Faculty of Mechanicsbecame the Faculty of Mechanical Engineering.

In 2004, the already existing Department of Psychology - Pedagogy – Teaching Methodology was established as an autonomous structure, namely the Faculty of Psychology and Educational Sciences.

In 2010, the Faculty of Law and Sociology was redefined by two new structures, the Faculty of Law and the Faculty of Sociology and Communication, the latter setting up a new undergraduate programme in 2017, Digital Media and Digital Media (in English) from 2022.

Starting with the academic year 2005-2006, the didactic activity is organized by study cycles: undergraduate studies, master's studies and doctoral studies. New curricula and new syllabi were designed, modern teaching, learning and assessment methods were introduced, which took account of the acquisition of knowledge and the creation of skills required of graduates on the labour market.

The institution has been managed since its foundation by:

Institute of Silviculture	Emil Negulescu	1948 – 1949
Institute of Silviculture	C.P. Brega	1949 – 1950
Institute of Silviculture	Atanasie Haralamb	1950 – 1951
Institute of Silviculture	Ioan Damian	1951 – 1953
Institute of Silviculture	Traian Popovici	1953 – 1956
Institute of Mechanics	Werner Voinarovski	1949 – 1951
Institute of Mechanics	Mircea Voinescu	1951 – 1953
Institute of Mechanics	Gheorghe Nițescu	1953 – 1956
Polytechnic Institute	Gheorghe Nițescu	1956–1961; 1966–1971
Polytechnic Institute	Victor Hoffmann	1961 – 1966
Pedagogic Institute	Eugen Chiș	1960 – 1971
University of Brașov	Marin Untari	1971 – 1972
University of Brașov	Radu C. Bogdan	1972 – 1975
University of Brașov	Florea Dudiță	1975 – 1984
University of Brașov	Filofteia Negruțiu	1984 – 1990
University of Brașov	Sergiu T. Chiriacescu	1990 – 1991
Transilvania University of Brașov	Sergiu T. Chiriacescu	1991 – 2004
Transilvania University of Brașov	Ion Vișa	2004 – 2012
Transilvania University of Brașov	Ioan Vasile Abrudan	2012 – present

== Faculties ==
The University's 18 faculties offer undergraduate, master's and doctoral degree study programmes, as well as distance learning, full-time and part-time study programmes.

Academic year	Study programmes					Doctoral fields
Academic year	Undergraduate			Master's degree		Doctoral fields
Academic year	Full-time	Part-time	Distance learning	Full-time	Part-time	Doctoral fields
2023-2024	81	6	11	63	3	22

Faculty	Study Programmes
Mechanical Engineering	Undergraduate: Automotive Engineering, Automotive Engineering (in English), Traffic and Transport Engineering, Mechanical Engineering, Mechanical Engineering (in English) Master's degree: Motor Vehicles and Future Technologies, Virtual Engineering and Automotive Design (in English), Practical Integrated Methods for Propulsion Systems Engineering (in English), Road Safety, Transport and Interaction with the Environment, Simulation and Testing in Mechanical Engineering, Motor Vehicles and Environment
Faculty of Technological Engineering and Industrial Management	Undergraduate: Aerospace Engineering, Engineering and Business Management, Engineering and Quality Management, Industrial Economic Engineering, Machine Building Technology, Digital Production Systems Master's degree: Innovative Manufacturing Engineering, Engineering of Advanced Manufacturing Processes, Industrial Business Management, Quality Management
Faculty of Materials Science and Engineering	Undergraduate: Welding Engineering, Industrial Safety Engineering, Materials Science, Biomaterials Engineering, Economic Engineering in Mechanics Master's degree: Occupational Safety and Work Health Engineering, Engineering and Management of Advanced Metallic, Ceramic and Composite Materials, Welding Engineering of Advanced Materials
Faculty of Product Design and Environment	Undergraduate: Industrial Design, Industrial Design (in English), Industrial Environmental Engineering and Protection, Engineering of Renewable Energy Systems, Medical Engineering, Mechatronics, Optometry, Product Design Engineering (in English) Master's degree: Sustainable Product Design and Environment Protection, Mechatronic Systems for Industry and Medicine
Faculty of Electrical Engineering and Computer Science	Undergraduate: Automation and Applied Informatics, Computers, Applied Electronics, Telecommunication Systems and Technologies, Electrotechnics, Electrical Engineering and Computers (in English), Robotics, Information Technology Master's degree: Cyber Security (in English), Advanced Systems in Automation and Information Technologies, Advanced Electrical Systems (in English), Electronic and Communication Integrated Systems
Faculty of Silviculture and Forest Engineering	Undergraduate: Wildlife, Forest Engineering, Terrestrial Measurements and Cadastre, Forest Management Master's degree: Management and Technical Systems in Forest Engineering, Forest Ecosystem Management, Multi-purpose Forestry (in English)
Faculty of Wood Engineering	Undergraduate: Wood Processing Engineering, Wood Products Engineering and Design Master's degree: Furniture Eco-design and Restoration, Advanced Wood Structures and Innovative Technologies
Faculty of Civil Engineering	Undergraduate: Railways, Roads and Bridges, Civil, Industrial and Agricultural Constructions, Installations for Civil Engineering Master's degree: Energy Modernization in the Built Environment
Faculty of Economic Sciences and Business Administration	Undergraduate: Business Administration (in English), International Business, Accountancy and Management Informatics, Economy of Trade, Tourism and Services, Finance and Banking, Economic Informatics, Management, Marketing Master's degree: Business Administration in Tourism, Financial and Banking Management, Management and Business Strategies, Accounting Policies, Audit and Management Control, Internal Audit, Marketing Policies and Strategies, International Economic Relations, Integrated Business Information Systems
Faculty of Food and Tourism	Undergraduate: Food Control and Expertise, Food Engineering, Engineering and Management in Food Service and Agri-Tourism, Engineering and Management in Tourism, Machinery and Installations for Agriculture and Food Industry Master's degree: Agricultural and Food Eco-Biotechnologies, Hospitality and Eco Agri-Tourism Management, Processing Systems and Quality Control of Agri-Food Products
Faculty of Mathematics and Computer Science	Undergraduate: Computer Science, Applied Computer Science, Applied Computer Science (in German), Mathematics and Computer Science Master's degree: Mobile Applications and Internet Technologies in E-Business, Fundamental Mathematical Structures, Internet Technologies, Modern Technologies in Software Systems Engineering
Faculty of Music	Undergraduate: Vocal Music Performance, Instrumental Music Performance, Music Master's degree: Music Therapy, Style and Interpretation in Instrumental and Vocal Performance, Musical Art and Techniques in the 20thCentury
Faculty of Medicine	Undergraduate: Medicine, General Nursing, Balneo-physical-kinetic Therapy and Recuperation, Clinical Laboratory Master's degree: Palliative Care Management and Strategies, Management of Preventive Strategies and Health Policies, Traditional Chinese Medicine (in English)
Faculty of Law	Undergraduate: Law Master's degree: Advanced Private Law, European Legislation and Judicial Careers, Systems and Institutions of European and International Law, Advanced Criminal Sciences
Faculty of Sociology and Communication	Undergraduate: Social Work, Communication and Public Relations, Digital Media, Digital Media (in English), Human Resources, Sociology Master's degree: Assistance and Community Development, Branding Campaign Management, Human Resources Management and Development
Faculty of Physical Education and Mountain Sports	Undergraduate: Physical Education and Sport, Kinetotherapy and Special Motor Activities, Sports and Motor Performance Master's degree: Psychometric Diagnosis and Prognosis, Management of Formal, Non-Formal and Health Recovery Activities, Sports Performance and Management
Faculty of Letters	Undergraduate: Chinese Language and Literature – A Modern Language and Literature (English/ French/ German) / Romanian Language and Literature; English Language and Literature - A Modern Language and Literature (French/ German) / Romanian Language and Literature; Romanian Language and Literature - A Modern Language and Literature (English/ French/ German); Applied Modern Languages (French/ German – English); American Studies (in English); Master's degree: Cultural Innovation, Studies of Romanian Language and Literature, Intercultural Studies of German Language and Literature (in German), Language Studies for Intercultural Communication (in English), Romanian Language and Literature – Identity and Multiculturalism, Culture and Discourse in the Anglo-American World
Faculty of Psychology and Education Sciences	Undergraduate: Pedagogy of Primary and Preschool Education, Psychology, Special Psychopedagogy Master's degree: Work and Organizational Psychology and Human Resources, Clinical Psychology, Counselling and Psychotherapy, Educational Psychology, School and Vocational Counselling, Early Education and Primary School Psychology, Human Resources In Education. Training and Management

== International Academic Cooperation ==
One of the strategic objective of this university, as is mentioned in their Strategic plan, is the internationalization achieved through: international affiliation, partnerships with higher education and scientific research institutions around the world, ensuring the framework for student and teacher mobility, participation in international education and research projects, conducting joint or double-degree study programmes in partnership with universities abroad.

Currently, Transilvania University of Brașov has concluded partnership agreements with 661 institutions from 85 countries on all continents and the number of full-time students increased to 521 from 87 countries in 2023. Also, seeking to intensify this process, the University invests part of its own funds to support a series of programmes such as: Transilvania Academica Scholarship – a scholarship granted to international students, Transilvania Fellowship for Young Researchers, Transilvania Fellowship for Visiting Professors, Romanian Diaspora at Transilvania University, Rector's Guests at Transilvania University (by which remarkable specialists from abroad are invited to the University, Artist in residence @ Transilvania University.

== Ranking ==
University rankings

Global – Overall
- QS World: 1201–1400 (2024)
- THE World: 1201–1500 (2024)
- USNWR Global: =710 (2023)

UNITBV maintains its position in 2024, respectively the 6th place in the ranking of Romanian universities in the most recent Metaranking for 2023, published by the Ministry of Education, being included since the first edition, published in 2016, in this ranking of the international visibility of Romanian universities.

In 2024, UNITBV moves up three positions in the ranking of Romanian universities appearing in the QS World University Rankings 2025 compared to the previous edition. At the same time, Transilvania University of Brasov enters the group of the top 500 European universities included in this ranking.

In the Shanghai 2023 rankings by fields of study, Transilvania University of Brasov achieved a notable presence, being indexed in three categories: Mathematics (401-500), Life Sciences - Human Biology (201-300) and Agricultural Sciences (301-400). The Shanghai 2023 ranking by field of study included 1900 universities from 104 countries.

An international ranking that evaluates higher education institutions according to how they align with the sustainable development objectives established by ONU, Impact Rankings 2020, made public by Times Higher Education – World University Rankings, includes 766 universities from 85 countries. UNITBV is ranked within the range 301–400 and third out of seven Romanian universities which are listed in this ranking.

== Research and Development Institute ==
Transilvania University of Brașov is the only university in Romania that has built its own multidisciplinary research institute. At the time of completion, in 2013, the University's Research and Development Institute was the largest investment in research infrastructure that a Romanian university made attracting European funds.

The Research-Development Institute of Transilvania University of Brașov (ICDT) was established through a structural funds project intended primarily to facilitate the increase of the University's competitiveness in national and international research. In addition, the development of the Institute also aimed at anchoring the University in the business environment of the region, through technology transfer and the development of applied research, in close connection with local and regional needs for research-development-innovation.

The scientific research at the University has been structured on 30 priority, interdisciplinary fields that enable its successful integration in the European Research Area. The 30 research centres are:

1. Renewable Energy Systems and Recycling
2. High-Tech Products for the Automotive Industry
3. Numerical Simulation, Testing and Mechanics of Composite Materials
4. Sustainable Forestry and Wildlife Management
5. Forest Engineering, Forest Management and Terrestrial Measurements
6. Advanced Mechatronic Systems
7. Advanced Manufacturing Technologies and Systems
8. Economic Engineering and Production Systems
9. Eco-Biotechnologies and Equipment in Food and Agriculture
10. Advanced Electrical Systems
11. Advanced Metal, Ceramics and MMC-Composite Materials and Technologies
12. Process Control Systems
13. Industrial Informatics and Robotics
14. Furniture Eco-Design, Restoration and Certification in the Wood Industry
15. Advanced Welding Eco-Technologies
16. Embedded Systems and Advanced Communications
17. Innovative Technologies and Advanced Products in the Wood Industry
18. Mathematical Modelling and Software Products
19. Economic Research
20. Fundamental Research and Prevention Strategies in Medicine
21. Applied Medicine and Interventional Strategies in Medical Practice
22. Cultural Innovation and Creativity
23. Theoretical and Applied Linguistics
24. Life Quality and Human Performance
25. Design of Mechanical Elements and Systems
26. Communication and Social Innovation
27. Personal, Professional and Institutional Development and Education for a Sustainable Community
28. Centre for Law Studies "Emil Poenaru"
29. The Science of Music – Excellence in Music Performance
30. Civil Engineering Design Centre of the PRO-DD Institute

== Other structures ==
=== University Library ===
Publications fund:

- 763,387 books;

- 135,039 journals;

- 22,036 descriptions of inventions;

- 50,098 volumes of special collections

- 81,203 standards copies.

=== The Multicultural Centre ===
The Multicultural Center of Transilvania University of Brașov serves as a platform for interaction between the community and contemporary art, offering a program of events and projects designed to promote artistic expression and the ideas of diverse cultures. With a multidisciplinary approach, the Center's activities encompass projects in visual arts, literature, contemporary music, film, theater, dance, philosophy, journalism, and more, coordinated or curated by renowned figures. Through the events it organizes, produces, or hosts, and through its partnerships, the Center aims to cultivate fundamental values such as critical thinking, openness to innovation and experimentation, tolerance and celebration of diversity, intellectual curiosity, and dialogue, which are essential in the environment where students are educated.

=== The Music Centre ===
The Music Centre was founded in 2015 to organize artistic events with famous Romanian and international musicians and to promote gifted students and young graduates of the Faculty of Music at Transilvania University of Brașov or other faculties of music in the country. The events take place at the University's Sergiu T. Chiriacescu Aula and offer concerts and recitals included in the Concert Season, the Brassovia Chamber Music Student Festival and the Opera Gala. The virtue of the musical performances is supported by the Steinway & Sons concert piano, the most modern digital organ in the country and the Neupert harpsichord "Blanchet".

The opening of the academic year 2019-2020 marked the opening of a new concert season of the Music Centre and the debut of the Chamber Orchestra of Transilvania University of Brașov (TUCO) with a concert conducted by maestro Traian Ichim. The newly established chamber orchestra has as Honorary President Prof. Dr. Eng. Ioan Vasile Abrudan, Rector of Transilvania University of Brașov.

=== Confucius Institute ===
The Confucius Institute at Transilvania University of Brașov was established in 2012, being created in partnership with Jianzhu University in Shenyang, China and operating under a cooperation agreement between Transilvania University in Brașov and Hanban – the Headquarters of the Confucius Institutes in Beijing. It is a non-profit organization that aims to teach and promote Chinese language learning, understanding Chinese culture and civilization, and to undertake cultural, educational and scientific exchanges with contemporary China.

=== Norbert Detaeye Media Centre ===
The university's media library is a cultural hub open to both the academic community and the general public, offering a vast collection of CDs, DVDs, VHS tapes, vinyl records, magazines, and books, alongside a variety of audio-visual equipment.

=== The Centre for Modern Languages ===
The Centre for Modern Languages at Transilvania University of Brașov is one of the interfaces of the University with the community to which it is addressed, while being also involved in research and training activities in collaboration with other departments of the University.

== Student life ==
Transilvania University of Brașov provides 13 dormitories for student housing, with a total of 4,086 beds. The dormitories are distributed across two campuses, namely Colina Campus and Memorandului Campus. UNITBV also has two cafeterias, one in each campus, which serve 1,000 students daily.

Within the Colina Campus complex is also Colina Arena, an outdoor soccer field covered with artificial turf where the students compete in the traditional soccer event Colina League Cup every autumn. Close to Colina Arena are four other indoor gyms for students, two of which are multipurpose ones, one is used for gymnastics, and another for fitness.

The students at Transilvania University of Brașov take part in various scientific, cultural, sports, and administrative activities every year. They also participate in internal project competitions which are financed by the University and aim at providing solutions for the continuous improvement of student life on the University Campus.

Every year, the students of the BlueStreamline team represent Transilvania University at international level, in the formula-style races organized within the Formula Student competition.

== Notable alumni ==
- Andreea Acatrinei – bronze, with the Romanian gymnastics team at the Beijing 2008 Olympic Games
- Marcian Cristea – university professor, Ruskin University England, Great Britain
- Rareș Dumitrescu –silver with the Romanian sword team at the London 2012 Olympic Games
- Felix Golbac – School Inspector, Bucharest
- Iosif Grămadă – Principal of the "Tudor Ciortea" High School, Brașov
- Victor Hănescu – 26th in tennis ATP 2009
- Alexandru Herlea – Professor Emeritus, Belfort-Montbeliard University of Technology, France
- Felicia Ionescu – Senior Economist, Federal Reserve System, USA
- Florin Ioraș – Professor, Buckinghamshire New University, Great Britain
- Ray Iunius – Director of Business Development, École hôtelière de Lausanne, Switzerland
- Monica Jiman – Chief Customer Success Officer Pentalog Europe & Asia
- Liviu Mircea Mateș – Director of the Brașov Philharmonic Orchestra
- Marius Modiga – music teacher, member of the vocal ensemble Anatoli
- Paula Rădulescu Ungureanu – bronze medal at the 2010 European Handball Championship
- Iulian Rusu – Artistic Director of the Brașov Philharmonic Orchestra
- Martha Eva Salcudean: Holocaust survivor, Professor Emerita at the University of British Columbia, Canada's first female head of a university engineering department – she got her first PhD (Mech. Eng.) at the Institute of Polytechnics, Brașov, 1969
- Raluca Strămăturaru and Valentin Crețu – multiple national sled champions, participants in three editions of the Winter Olympic Games
- Gabriel Tamaș – 63 selections and three goals for the representative football team of Romania
- Eva Tofalvi – gold at the 2008-2009 World Biathlon Championship, participant in six editions of the Winter Olympic Games
- Ciprian Țuțu – Conductor of the Radio Choir, Bucharest
- Delia Vișan – director of international projects, Paris Dauphine University, France

== Members of the academic community involved in the political and administrative life ==
- Ștefan Vasile Beres – Deputy in the Romanian Parliament (2008 - 2012)
- Aristotel Căncescu – Senator in the Romanian Parliament (1990 - 1996); President of the Brașov County Council (2000 - 2016)
- Sergiu Chiriacescu – the first mayor (prefect) of Brașov County after the Romanian Revolution (January - February 1990); member of the County Council and of the Permanent Delegation of the Brașov County Council (1990 - 1996); Senator in the Romanian Parliament (1996 - 2000); Local Councillor of Brașov municipality
- Ioan-Cristian Chirteș – Deputy in the Romanian Parliament (2012 - 2016) and Senator in the Romanian Parliament (2016 – present)
- Ivan Cismaru – Senator in the Romanian Parliament (2004 - 2008), Vice President of the Senate (April - September 2008)
- Allen Coliban – Senator in the Romanian Parliament (2016 - 2020), Mayor of Brașov (2020 - 2024)
- Ion Diniță – Member of the Romanian Parliament (2012 - 2015)
- Florea Dudiță – Senator in the Romanian Parliament (1992 -1996) and Ambassador of Romania in the Federal Republic of Germany (1995 - 1997)
- Ion Dumitru – Deputy in the Romanian Parliament (2004 - 2012)
- Marius-Alexandru Dunca – Senator in the Romanian Parliament (2016–present); Minister of Youth and Sports (January 4, 2017 - January 26, 2018)
- Gheorghe Flutur – Senator in the Romanian Parliament (2000 - 2004), (2004 - 2008) and (2012 - 2016); President of Suceava County Council, Minister of Agriculture, Forests and Rural Development (December 2004 - October 2006).
- Filip Georgescu – Deputy in the Romanian Parliament (1990 -1992) and (2000 - 2012)
- Tinel Gheorghe – Deputy in the Romanian Parliament (2008 – 2012; 2012 – 2016; 2016 – 2020)
- Ioan Ghișe – Senator in the Romanian Parliament (2008 - 2016); Deputy in the Romanian Parliament (1992 - 1996) and (2004 - 2008) and Mayor of Brașov (1996 - 2004)
- Alexandru Ion Herlea – Minister of European Integration (December 11, 1996 - December 22, 1999); Ambassador, Head of the Romanian Mission to the EU (2000 - 2001)
- Pavel Horj – Deputy in the Romanian Parliament (2008 - 2012)
- Gheorghe Ialomițeanu – Deputy in the Romanian Parliament (2008 - 2016); Minister of Finance (September 3, 2010 – February 9, 2012)
- Liviu Laza - Matiuța – Deputy in the Romanian Parliament (2012 - 2016)
- Gheorghe Marin – Deputy in the Romanian Parliament (1997 - 2004) and (2012 - 2016); Senator in the Romanian Parliament (2016 - 2020)
- Ovidius Mărcuțianu – Senator in the Romanian Parliament (2008 - 2012)
- Leonard Orban – European Commissioner for Multilingualism (January 2007 - February 2010), Minister of European Affairs (2011 - 2012) and Presidential Adviser (March 2010 - September 2011) and (January 2015 – November 2021); decorated with the Order "Star of Romania" in the rank of Knight, for his contribution to Romania's accession to NATO, in 2002
- Ludovic Orban – Prime Minister of Romania (November 4, 2019 – December 7, 2020) and Minister of Transport (April 2007 - December 2008); president of the National Liberal Party of Romania (June 2017 - September 2021); Deputy in the Romanian Parliament (2008 - 2016)
- Gheorghe Secară – Senator in the Romanian Parliament (1992 - 1996); Deputy in the Romanian Parliament and Vice-Chairman of the Education Commission (1996 - 2000)
- Ovidiu Ioan Silaghi – Vice-President of the Committee on Budgetary Control of the European Parliament (January 31, 2007 – April 2, 2007); European Parliament (January 1, 2007 – April 2, 2007) and (September 4, 2013 – June 10, 2014); Deputy in the Romanian Parliament (2000 - 2004) and (2012 - 2013); Minister of Transport (May 7, 2012 - December 21, 2012); Minister for Small and Medium-sized Enterprises, Trade, Tourism and the Liberal Professions (April 5, 2007 – December 22, 2008)
- Mihai Stepanescu – Mayor of Resita (2008 - 2015)
- Emil Stoica – Deputy in the Romanian Parliament (1990 - 1992) and (1992 - 1996)
- Mihai Sturzu – Deputy in the Romanian Parliament (2012 - 2016)
- Lucian Șova – Deputy in the Romanian Parliament (2012 - 2020); Minister of Communications and Information Society (June 29, 2017 - January 29, 2018); Minister of Transport and Infrastructure (January 29, 2018 - February 22, 2019)
- Ion Tabugan – Deputy in the Romanian Parliament (2008 – 2012; 2012 – 2016; 2016 – 2020)
- Romică Tomescu – Minister of Waters, Forests and Environmental Protection (April 17, 1998 - December 28, 2000)
