= Hi-Q (band) =

Romanian pop group

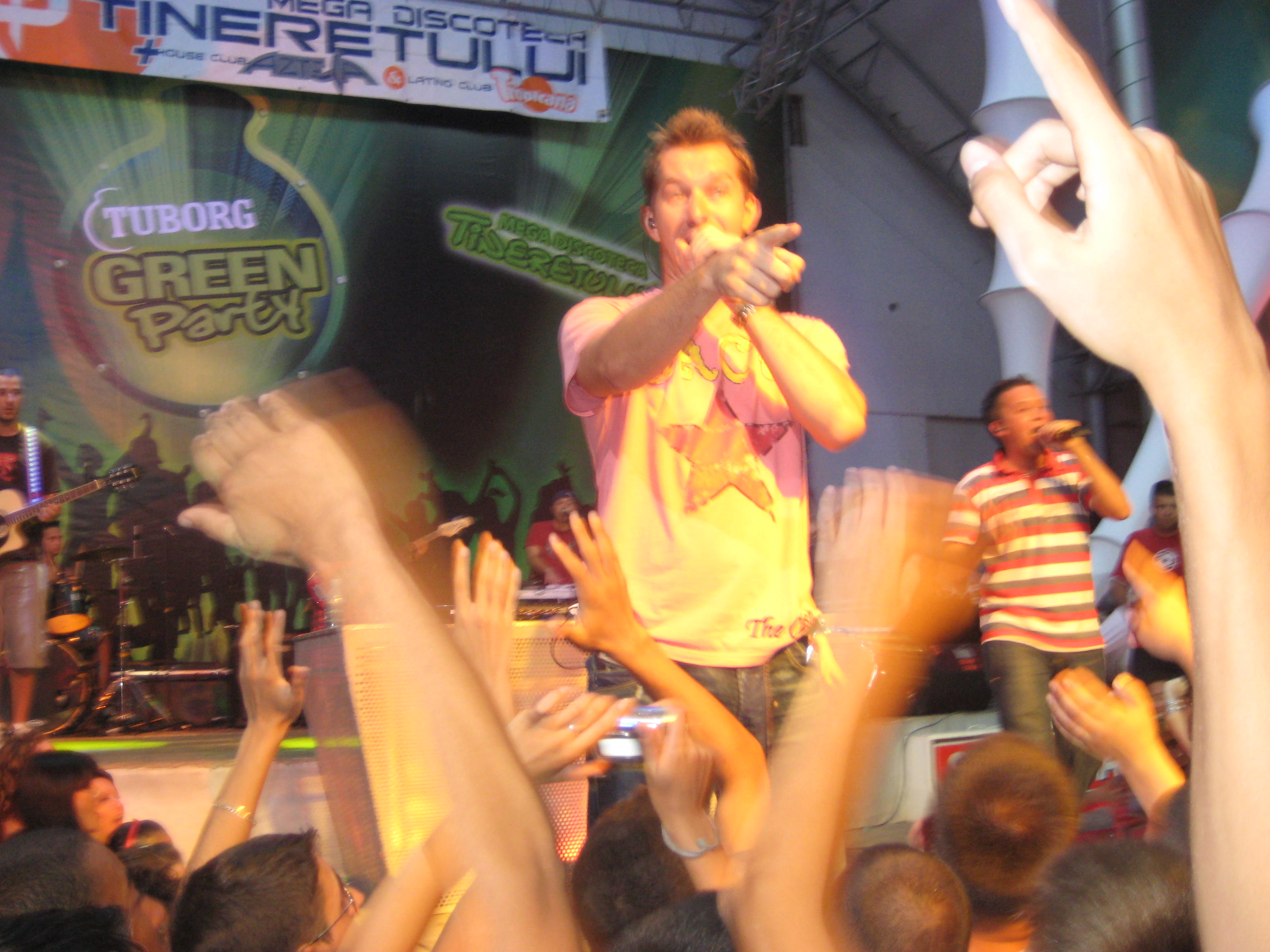
- Hi-Q performing at Mega Discoteca Tineretului in Costinești

Background information
- Origin: Romania
- Genres: Pop
- Years active: 1996–2014
- Labels: Roton (1998-2002); Cat Music / Sony Music (2002-2014)
- Members: Mihai Sturzu (1996-2014); Florin Grozea (1996-2014); Dana Nălbaru (1996-2003, 2010-2014)
- Past members: Nicoleta Drăgan (2003-2008); Anya Buxai (2008-2010)
- Website: www.hi-q.ro

Hi-Q was a Romanian pop group, founded in 1996 in Braşov. The original group consisted of Mihai Sturzu, Florin Grozea, and Dana Nălbaru. Described by Libertatea as one of the best-known musical groups in Romania, Hi-Q also hosted its own TV show on national television. Dana Nălbaru left the group in 2003 to pursue a solo career and returned in October 2010. On 31 July 2014, on a news magazine show presented by Teo Trandafir, the band split.

== Band members ==
=== Members ===
- Florin-Alexandru Grozea: singer, songwriter, music producer (1996-2014)
- Mihai Sturzu: singer, manager (1996-2014)
- Dana Nălbaru: singer (1996–2003, late 2010–2014)

=== Former members ===
- Nicoleta Drăgan: singer, songwriter, joined after Nălbaru's 2003 departure, officially left the band in April 2008
- Anya Buxai: singer, joined after Drăgan's 2008 departure, left the band in 2010

=== Band ===
- Tuliga Florin - sound engineer
- Cristi Matesan - drums
- Virgil Dulceanu - keyboards
- Mac Aciobăniței - guitar

== Discography ==
=== Albums ===
- ...urasQbesc (1999)
- Dă muzica mai tare!!! (2001)
- Pentru prieteni (2002)
- O mare de dragoste (2004)
- Razna (2006)
- De 10 ani va multumim! (2007)
- Când zâmbești (2012)

=== Singles ===
- "Nu pot face nimic" (1998)
- "Hi-Q Iz in da Hauz" (1999)
- "Apa de mare" (1999)
- "Totul va fi bine" (2000)
- "E vara mea" (2000)
- "Cât te iubeam" (2001)
- "Un minut" (2001)
- "Dă muzica mai tare" (2001)
- "Tu ești dragostea mea" (2002) - Romanian Top 100 No. 1
- "Prea departe" (2002)
- "Trăiește!" (2003)
- "Dor de tine, dor de noi" (2003) - Romanian Top 100 No. 1
- "Mai dulce" (2003)
- "Poveste fără nume" (2004)
- "Gașca mea" (2004)
- "Te-am iubit, dar..." (2005)
- "Razna" (2006)
- "Ce bine e" (2006)
- "Buna dimineața" (2007)
- "Așa-s prietenii" (2008)
- "Lose You" (2009)
- "Ice of You" (2010)
- "The One" (2010)
- "Încă o dată" (2010)
- "Strada ta" (2012)
- "Solo" (2012)
- "Soare" (2012)
- "Luni" (2013)
