= Florea Dudiță =

Romanian politician (1934–2025)

Member of the Senate of Romania
- In office 22 October 1992 – 10 June 1993
- Succeeded by: Ioan Lupu

Personal details
- Born: 12 April 1934; Vitomirești, Romania
- Died: 12 June 2025 (aged 91); Brașov, Romania
- Political party: FDSN
- Education: Polytechnic Institute of Brașov; Moscow Automotive Mechanical Institute
- Occupation: Academic, diplomat

Florea Dudiță (12 April 1934 – 12 June 2025), also spelled Florea Duditza, was a Romanian politician who was a member of the Democratic National Salvation Front. He served in the Senate from 1992 to 1993.

== Life and career ==
Born in Vitomirești, Olt County, he studied engineering at the Polytechnic Institute of Brașov. In 1959 he joined the faculty in the Department of Mechanisms and Machine Parts at his alma mater. From 1972 to 1990, he served as prorector and rector of the University of Brașov. From 1995 to 1997, he served as Ambassador of Romania to Germany. Dudiță died in Brașov on 12 June 2025, at the age of 91.
