= Bolovăniș =

Bolovăniș may refer to the following places in Romania:

- Bolovăniș, a village in the commune Ghimeș-Făget, Bacău County
- Bolovăniș, a tributary of the Neagra Broștenilor in Harghita County
- Bolovăniș (Tarcău), a tributary of the Tarcău in Neamț County
- Bolovăniș, a tributary of the Trotuș in Bacău County

== See also ==
- Bolovan (disambiguation)
