= Dana Nălbaru =

Background information
- Also known as: Dana Nălbaru
- Born: Daniela-Alina Nălbaru; 23 October 1976 (age 49); Braşov, Romania
- Genres: pop
- Occupations: singer, composer
- Years active: 1997–present
- Formerly of: Hi-Q (band)
- Spouse: Dragoş Bucur (married 2005–)

Dana Nălbaru (born 23 October 1976) is a Romanian singer, songwriter, and musician.

Widely known as former HI-Q band member, Dana Nălbaru started her solo music career in 2004 with her first music album Zbor.

She currently resides in Bucharest, Romania, together with her husband, Romanian actor Dragoş Bucur, their daughter Sofia, born in 2007 and their adopted daughter, India Roxana.

It was announced in late October 2010 that she returned to the band, without quitting solo career. In early 2013, she launched new solo singles and she announced further music releases.

== Life and music career ==
Nălbaru was born in Braşov in 1976 into a low-income family typical for the Communist period. With no available means to acquire cassette players, Dana stated how she used to skip classes in mid-school in order to listen her favorite artists during the one-hour music broadcast on radio. Her passion for music made her later attend the Popular Arts School in Brasov, where she completed her musical education. While struggling with shyness issues, which she later said she controlled by breathing exercises, in 1997 Nălbaru joined the newly formed band HI-Q with Mihai and Florin. With her special vocal skills, she soon becomes the main-singer of the band, and joins HI-Q in its swift-running success. One of the most famous bands of the period, together they put out nine videos to date and three albums. Their climbing popularity soon involves them inside the television industry by hosting several successful shows targeting the young audience. In 2000, Dana hosts by herself her first TV show. While their music enjoyed an intense mediatization, the band concerted all across the country and neighborhood foreign countries in various tours.

By 2002, Nălbaru's musical aspirations made her decide to leave the HI-Q and start her own solo-career. While still hosting television shows, Dana creates her first solo-album in 2004, called Zbor (Fly), followed soon by Intra in joc (Get in the game) in 2005, accompanied by four videos. The first for Zbor (Fly), then the very optimist La-la-la, after this, the ballad Am nimic fara tine (I have nothing without you). Her fourth video was made for the main song play Intra in joc (Get in the game) associated with the eponymous album.

Her desire for artistic independence free from commercial coercions pushed her to break-away from music record companies, and launch her next album by herself in 2008, called Parfum (Perfume) made available for the public through free digital download. Her first video for the play Mai e o zi was evidential for her pursue of individuality, free spirit and nonconformity by showing Nălbaru symbolically paring her hair. A hairless Dana Nălbaru was the image associated throughout her new album promotion campaign. A second video directed by her husband Dragoş Bucur for the play Tu (You), which also cast a number of known TV actors like Dan Bordeianu, stated her main artistic motto that "love heals everything".

This last message was later expanded as the main theme for her 4th album, called One Love, launched in October 2010. A main difference from her other music appearances is that this time, all the songs are recited in English only. A video for the main play "Love", part of this last album, was also released.

In late October 2010, Dana Nălbaru returned inside the music band that consecrated her HI-Q, after 7 years of solo career. As a result of her return, she took part in composing and releasing in 2012 the band's album Când zâmbeşti.

Since this time, she continued working separately on her own music creations, and by March 2013 she released a couple of new singles for public download.

On July 31st, 2014 she left HI-Q.

== Other appearances ==
Besides her music creations, Nălbaru hosted several television shows while still part of the HI-Q band. In 2005 she appeared in the movie După ea ("After Her") in a secondary role, while acting along her husband and other notable Romanian film actors like Victor Rebengiuc.

=== Acting roles ===
Year	Film	Role
2005	După ea	Diana

In 2007, Dana Nălbaru put out a DVD issue for young parents, Cum să am grijă de copilul meu ("How to Take Care of My Child") containing a complete pediatric guide for newborns.

A new film acting appearance for Dana Nălbaru was in late 2012, with Dragoş Bucur. Promoting new TV Channel Film Cafe, in their first local production entitled Îndrăgostiţi ca-n filme, she starred in 40 short movie episodes.

=== Collaborations ===
Year	Band	Song
2013	Proconsul	Făra tine youtube link

== Discography ==
=== Singles ===
Year	Single	Format
2013	Iubire youtube link	music download
2013	Can't get you out of my head youtube link	music download

=== Albums ===
Year	Album	Format
2004	Zbor	CD (Cat Music)
2005	Intră in joc	CD (Cat Music)
2008	Parfum	music download
2010	One Love	music download

=== Zbor (2004) ===
No.	Title	Length
1.	"Am nimic fără tine youtube link"	3:20
2.	"Băiatul rock"	3:16
3.	"Doar un copil"	3:35
4.	"Iartă-mă"	2:13
5.	"La la la (poftă de viaţă)"	3:04
6.	"Oraşul (feat. Pio)"	3:42
7.	"Te Iubesc (overdose remix)"	3:59
8.	"Te iubesc"	3:54
9.	"Te-am căutat"	3:37
10.	"Zbor youtube link"	3:44

=== Intră în joc (2005) ===
No.	Title	Length
1.	"Intră în Joc youtube link"	2:45
2.	"Dacă"	3:18
3.	"Noi doi"	3:28
4.	"Ascultă muzica"	3:03
5.	"Inima mea"	3:32
6.	"Te iubesc (feat. Andrada)"	3:59
7.	"Poate-ntr-o zi (feat. Mihai Ogăşanu)"	2:41
8.	"Ţine-te bine"	4:14
9.	"Blockparty"	3:25

=== Parfum (2008) ===
No.	Title	Length
1.	"Mai e o zi youtube link"	4:02
2.	"Acelaşi suflet"	3:44
3.	"Parfum"	4:43
4.	"Tu youtube link"	2:55
5.	"Respect"	3:06
6.	"Cum vreau eu"	3:35
7.	"Lasă-mă in pace"	3:51
8.	"Lazy"	3:46
9.	"I Call Your Name"	3:37

=== One Love (2010) ===
No.	Title	Length
1.	"Words"	3:15
2.	"In Love"	4:33
3.	"I Call Your Name"	3:15
4.	"One Day"	3:24
5.	"Drop a Little Love"	4:13
6.	"Don't"	2:42
7.	"Love youtube link"	3:46
8.	"Hello"	3:34
9.	"On The Edge"	3:13

== See also ==
- Main article: HI-Q band
