= Mihai Sturzu =

Romanian politician

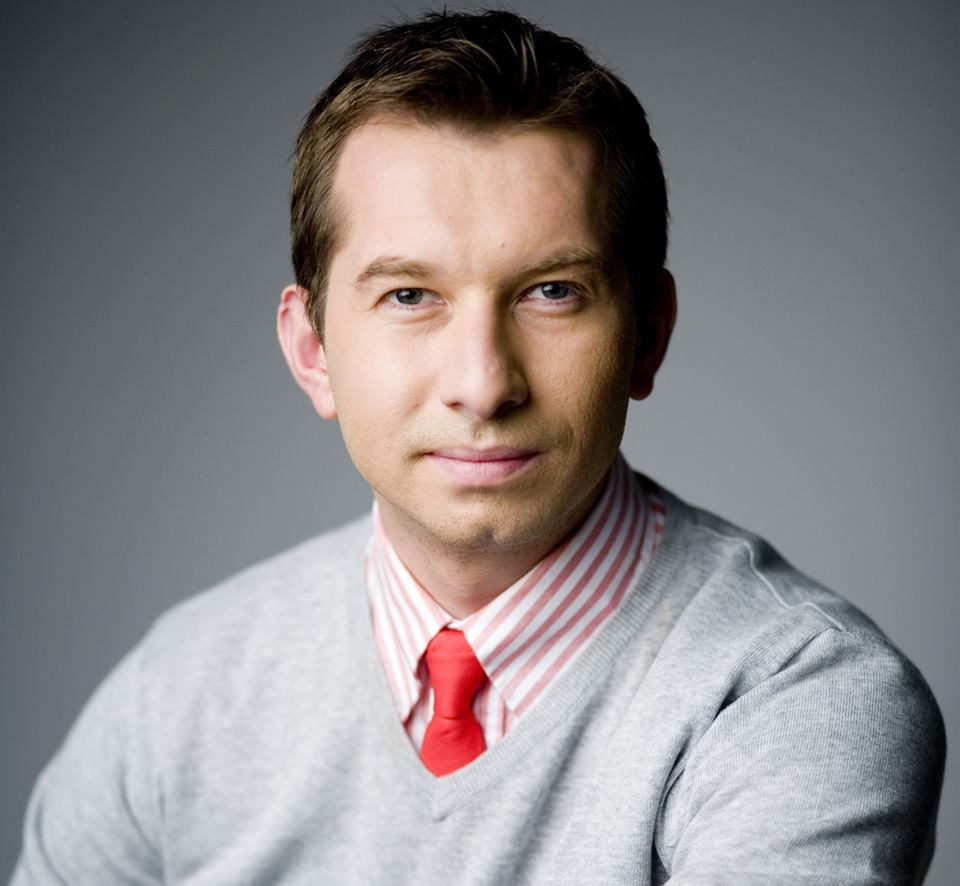
- Official portrait, 2014

President of Romanian Social Democratic Youth
- In office 19 October 2013 – 19 December 2015
- Preceded by: Nicolae Bănicioiu, Victor Ponta
- Succeeded by: Gabriel Petrea

Member of the Romanian Chamber of Deputies
- In office 9 December 2012 – December 2016
- Constituency: No. 42 – Sector 6 (Bucharest), Electoral district No. 24

Personal details
- Born: October 3, 1979 (age 46) Bucharest, Romania
- Party: Social Democratic Party (2010–2015); Independent (2015–)
- Profession: Journalist, singer, television presenter
- Website: www.mihaisturzu.ro

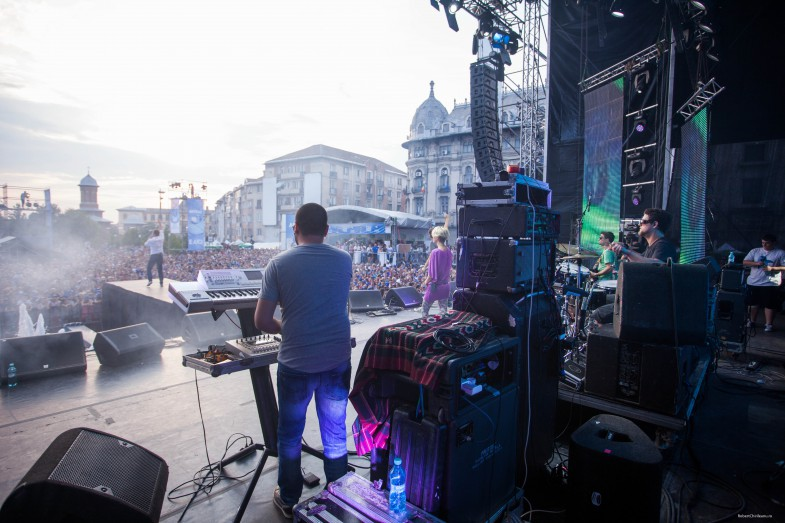
Mihai Sturzu performing in Hi-Q, back in 2012

Mihai Răzvan Sturzu (born October 3, 1979) is a Romanian politician,pilot, former President of Romanian Social Democratic Youth and member of the Romanian Chamber of Deputies. He was known for being a member of pop band Hi-Q, a successful Romanian band of the 2000s, from which he officially retired on 31 July 2014, after 18 years of activity.

== Studies and first years of professional activity ==
Mihai-Răzvan Sturzu was born in Bucharest, Romania but he spent his childhood in Brașov, Romania where his parents were living. In 1998, he graduated „Unirea" National College, foreign languages department and in literature department of the Transylvania University of Braşov, in the city of Brașov.

In 1996 he founded the band Hi-Q with his childhood friend, Florin Grozea. In the following years, the band became more and more popular among the young generation. After the success of their first video "Totul va fi bine" (meaning "Everything's gonna be alright"), Mihai and his colleagues started producing their own TV shows at Antena 1, Antena 2, Prima TV, Acasă TV, TVR1, TVR2 and radio shows at Magic FM and Radio 21. They performed in more than 1000 concerts with the band Hi-Q, most of them national but also abroad. His public figure status brought him various television appearances.

The year 2000 marks the beginning of his television career and also the return to his hometown, Bucharest where he continued his studies at the Department of Journalism, Hyperion University, which he graduated in 2004. During his college years, he continued collaborating with various TV channels, accumulating extensive experience in television journalism. In that period he also accomplished one of his adolescence dreams, to experience being a war reporter, even if for a few days. This happened in 2002 at the invitation of the Ministry of Defense, when he participated two times in the Afghanistan War theatre to perform in front of the Romanian troops, with his pop group Hi-Q.

During this period he was also involved in social and humanitarian activities, social responsibility campaigns focused on education, environment, culture and personal development, showing civic spirit, being the partner of "Special Olympics", "Let's do it, Romania" (in Romanian) and "PSI" (Population Services International) foundations.

== Political career ==
=== Early years ===
In 2007, Mihai Sturzu designed a non-formal education program called "My Role Model" with the purpose of redirecting the attention of the young generation towards the public figures who brought real benefits to Romania and can be considered as true role models. After a few years in which he kept trying to implement "My Role Model" at national level, he got the idea to promote his project within a political party. Thus, in 2007, he begins to actively participate at the meetings of the TSD organizations and therefore becomes a sympathizer of the Social Democratic Party.

In 2010, at the suggestion of the President of the Social Democratic Party, Victor Ponta, Mihai Sturzu officially began his political life. He became a member of the Social Democratic Party and shortly after, he was nominated to be the spokesperson of TSD (Social Democratic Youth Romania).

In May 2012 he was appointed as counsellor of the Prime Minister on Youth Affairs.

=== Election to Parliament ===
In the fall of 2012, with the support of the Social Democratic Party, Mihai Sturzu joined the race for a position in the Chamber of Deputies in the constituency number 24 of Sector 6, Bucharest. The election campaign was led under the slogan "A Parliament in the rhythm of my generation" and was accomplished with the help of 30 volunteers, students from the political science departments of colleges. Among with them, Mihai went daily to the area of his constituency and talked to the people to get a better understanding of their problems and expectations. On 20 December 2012, after winning the elections with the vote of 65% of the citizens, he became an official member of the legislature 2012 – 2016 and was nominated member of the Cultural Committee in the Chamber of Deputies.

The concern of Mihai Sturzu for the needs of the young generation was also reflected in his work in the Parliament. Since he was elected as a deputy, he offered students an opportunity for internships in his parliamentary office.

Furthermore, to support the youth, Mihai Sturzu submitted in September 2013 a project for the amendment of the Law on Volunteering. This project provides regulation in the volunteering sector according to European standards. Applauded by the NGOs and supported by 106 MPs of the main parliamentary groups, the bill passed in both Senate and Chamber of Deputies and became a Law on 23 June 2014, when it was signed by the President of Romania.

In December 2015, he resigned from the PSD and became an independent.

=== Social Democratic Youth leadership ===
On 19 October 2013, Mihai Sturzu was elected President of the Social Democratic Youth. Under his leadership, in January 2014, a branch of TSD was established in the Republic of Moldova, having as main goal the promotion of European and social democratic values among the young generation across the Prut.

TSD next objective is the establishment of TSD Diaspora branch, which aims to unite young Romanian Social Democrats living outside Romania.

His term ended in December 2015; Sturzu did not run for re-election because he had reached the age limit. Two days after a party congress where he came into conflict with new party president Liviu Dragnea, he quit the party.

== Other activities ==
In 2012 he started aviation school and obtained a private pilot license (PPL). He intends to obtain a commercial airline pilot license ATPL as well. In April 2016, in pursuit of this objective, Sturzu completed the theoretical courses of the Higher Civil Aviation School.

Another hobby of Mihai Sturzu is diving. After passing several tests, he obtained the Open Water Diver license.

Mihai was always active in sports. When he was a teenager he was a professional handball player for six years. In the last years he was constantly present as a goalkeeper for the National Artists Football team.

Nevertheless, he is very fond of bike riding, the longest ride in the same day being the one between Bucharest and Brasov (~ 160 km). His passion for cycling became notorious, when in a television shooting, Mihai missed his bicycle jump and fell during the recording, which became popular on the internet.

Since fall 2017 he's a pilot for Wizz Air.
