= Geamăna (Olt) =

- Location within Romania

Location
- Country: Romania
- Counties: Olt, Vâlcea
- Villages: Geamăna

Physical characteristics
- Mouth: Olt
  - location: Buciumeni
  - coordinates: 44.7899°N 24.2828°E
- Length: 12 km (7.5 mi)
- Basin size: 61 km^{2} (24 sq mi)

Basin features
- Progression: Olt→ Danube→ Black Sea
- Tributaries
  - left: Dejeasca, Bolovan
- River code: VIII.1.156

The Geamăna is a left tributary of the river Olt in Romania. It flows into the Olt near Buciumeni. Its length is 12 km (7.5 mi) and its basin size is 61 km^{2} (24 sq mi).
