= Vitomirești =

- Commune
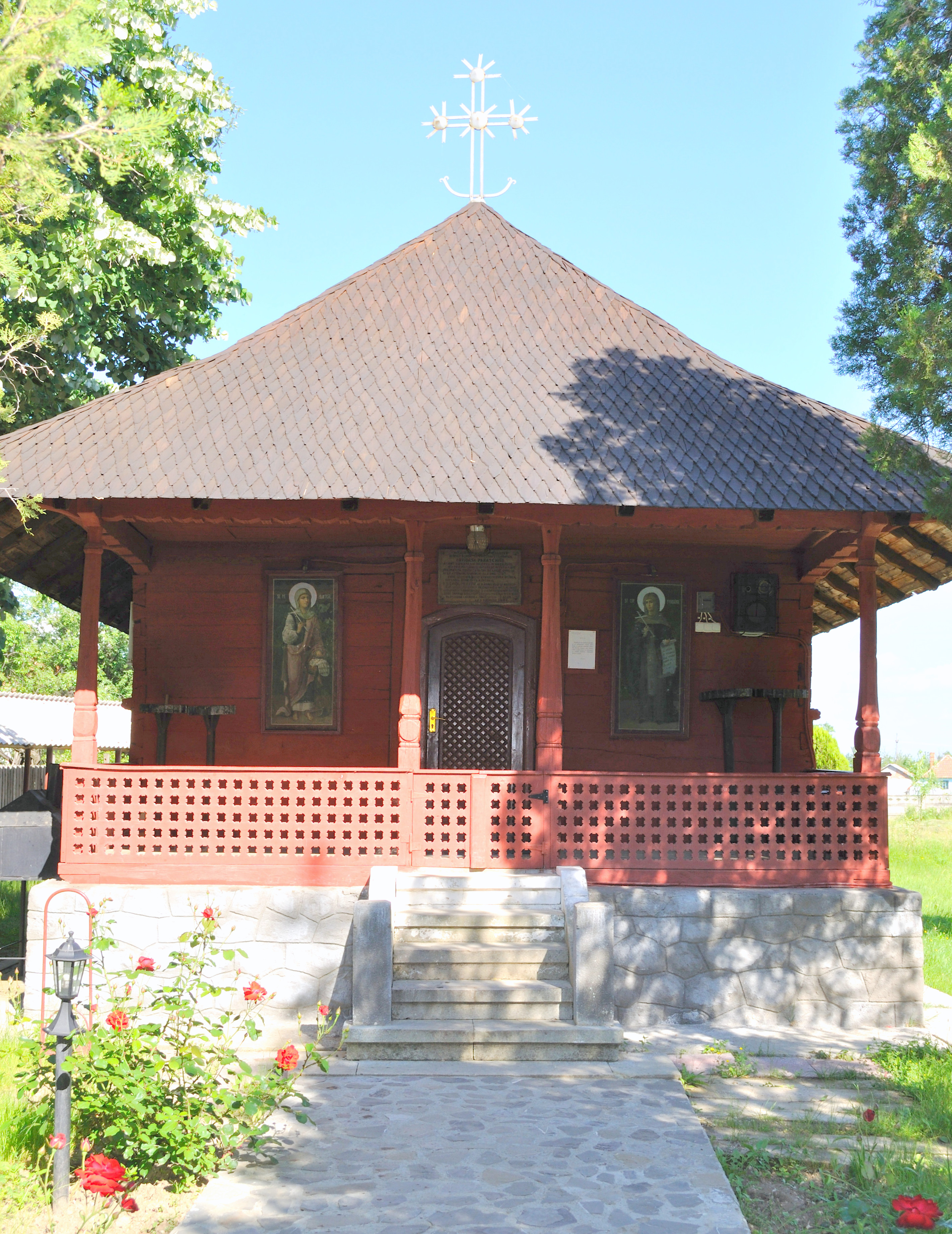
- Wooden church in Vitomirești

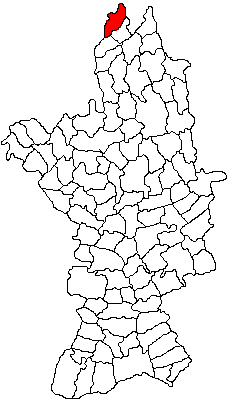
- Location in Olt County

- Location in Romania
- Coordinates: 44°52′N 24°24′E
- Country: Romania
- County: Olt

Government
  - Mayor (2020–2024): Ion-Robert Rotea (PSD)
- Area: 46.25 km^{2} (17.86 sq mi)
- Elevation: 404 m (1,325 ft)
- Population (2021-12-01): 1,807
  - Density: 39.07/km^{2} (101.2/sq mi)
- Time zone: UTC+02:00 (EET)
  - Summer (DST): UTC+03:00 (EEST)
- Postal code: 237545
- Area code: +(40) 249
- Vehicle reg.: OT
- Website: primariavitomiresti.ro

Vitomirești is a commune in Olt County, Muntenia, Romania. It is composed of six villages: Bulimanu, Dejești, Donești, Stănuleasa, Trepteni, and Vitomirești.

== Geography ==
The commune is situated on the line of contact between the Wallachian Plain and the Getic Plateau, at an altitude of 404 m (1,325 ft), on the banks of the river Dejeasca. It is located at the extreme north of Olt County, on the border with Vâlcea County, 58 km (36 mi) from the county seat, Slatina.

== Natives ==
- Florea Dudiță (1934–2025), politician, senator (1992–1993)
