= Drăgoești, Vâlcea =

Drăgoești
- Commune
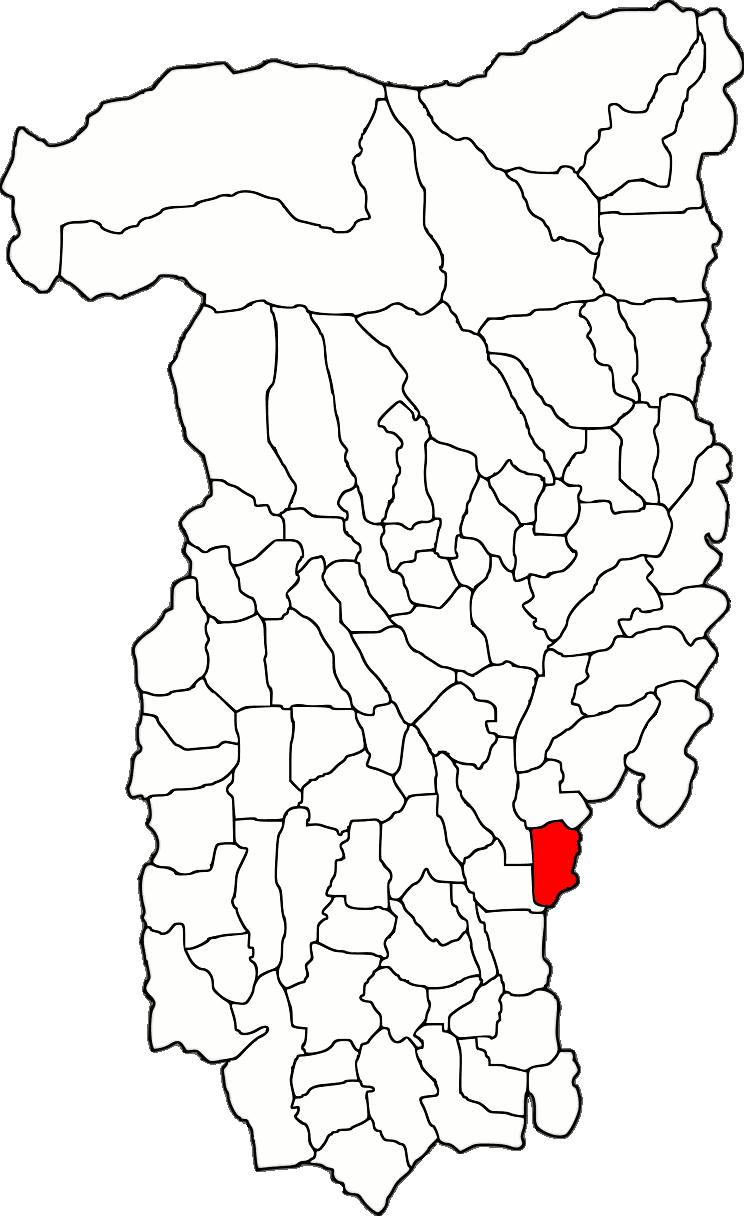
- Location in Vâlcea County

- Location in Romania
- Coordinates: 44.8110°N 24.2917°E
- Country: Romania
- County: Vâlcea
- Population (2021-12-01): 1,724
- Time zone: EET/EEST (UTC+2/+3)
- Vehicle reg.: VL

Drăgoești is a commune located in Vâlcea County, Muntenia, Romania. It is composed of three villages: Buciumeni, Drăgoești and Geamăna.
