= List of songs written by Alexandru Cotoi =

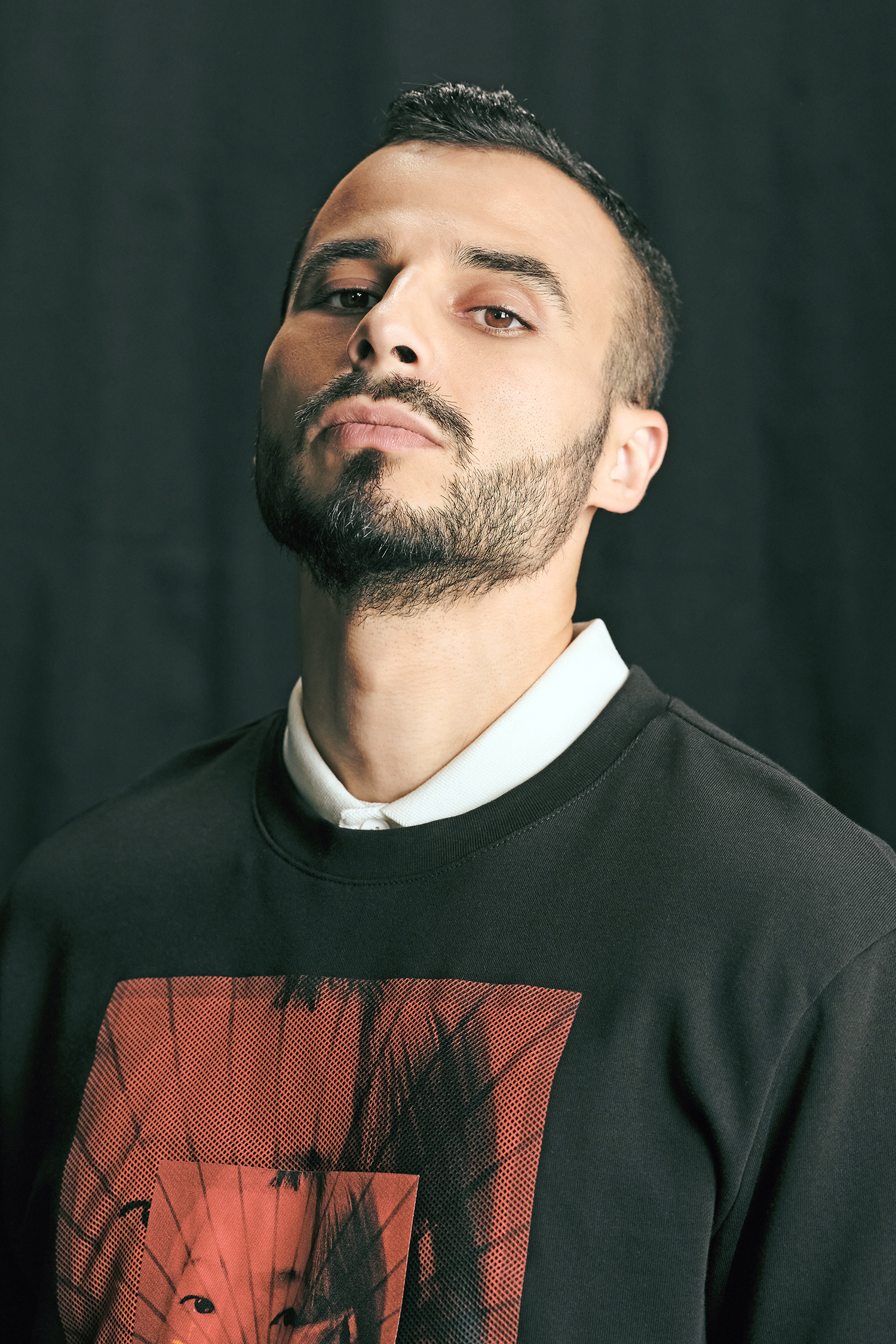
Alexandru Cotoi in 2021

Romanian composer, producer and DJ Alexandru Cotoi has written songs for various artists, mostly Romanian. (Note: Cotoi is credited as a writer by the ASCAP and UCMR–ADA as Alexandru Florin Cotoi.) He has written songs under his full name or a shorter version of his first name, Alex Cotoi, and has released music under the pseudonym Sickotoy. Cotoi published his first songs in 2003. In October 2007, while being part of Morandi, he formed the music group Sonichouse alongside Radu Dumitriu, Răzvan Gorcinski, and Victor Bourosu. By September 2009, the group had published five songs on their Myspace profile and announced that they were working on their debut album, which was released on 16 April 2011, titled Supersonic.

During his career, Cotoi has accrued several notable writing credits. He co-wrote nine tracks on Alexandra Stan's 2014 studio album Unlocked, including the singles "Dance", "Thanks for Leaving" and "Vanilla Chocolat". In 2015, he contributed to "Baddest Girl in Town" which appears on Pitbull's ninth studio album Dale. Aside from the single "Sub pielea mea", which peaked at number one in the Commonwealth of Independent States, Romania, and Russia, Cotoi co-wrote three other tracks on Carla's Dreams's debut album Ngoc. He contributed to the group's second album Antiexemplu, writing each track alongside them. Cotoi was also heavily involved in the songwriting process for Irina Rimes's Cosmos and Delia's 7, respectively. In 2019, under the pseudonym Sickotoy, he released his debut single "Addicted" featuring Minelli. The song peaked at number two in Romania. His next single, "You Don't Love Me" featuring Roxen, attained similar success, peaking at number three in Romania and at number seven in Bulgaria.

In 2020, as part of a collaboration with TVR, Global Records was tasked with selecting the Romanian entry for the 65th edition of the Eurovision Song Contest. Cotoi was one of the songwriters involved, having co-written two of the five songs that were chosen for the national final, those being "Beautiful Disaster" and "Colors". In the same year, he collaborated with Inna on her seventh studio album, Heartbreaker, having a writing credit on each track. The album's lead single, "Flashbacks", peaked at number four in Romania, reached number one in Russia and was the most played song in 2021 in the former according to Media Forest. The two collaborated again in 2021 for Inna's eighth studio album, Champagne Problems, which was released in 2022. Another 2021 collaboration of theirs was the non-album single "Up", which peaked at number one in Romania. Other writing credits which topped the Romanian music charts include Minelli's "Mariola", "Insula" by The Motans and Emaa, and Iuliana Beregoi's "Cum sună liniștea".

== Songs ==
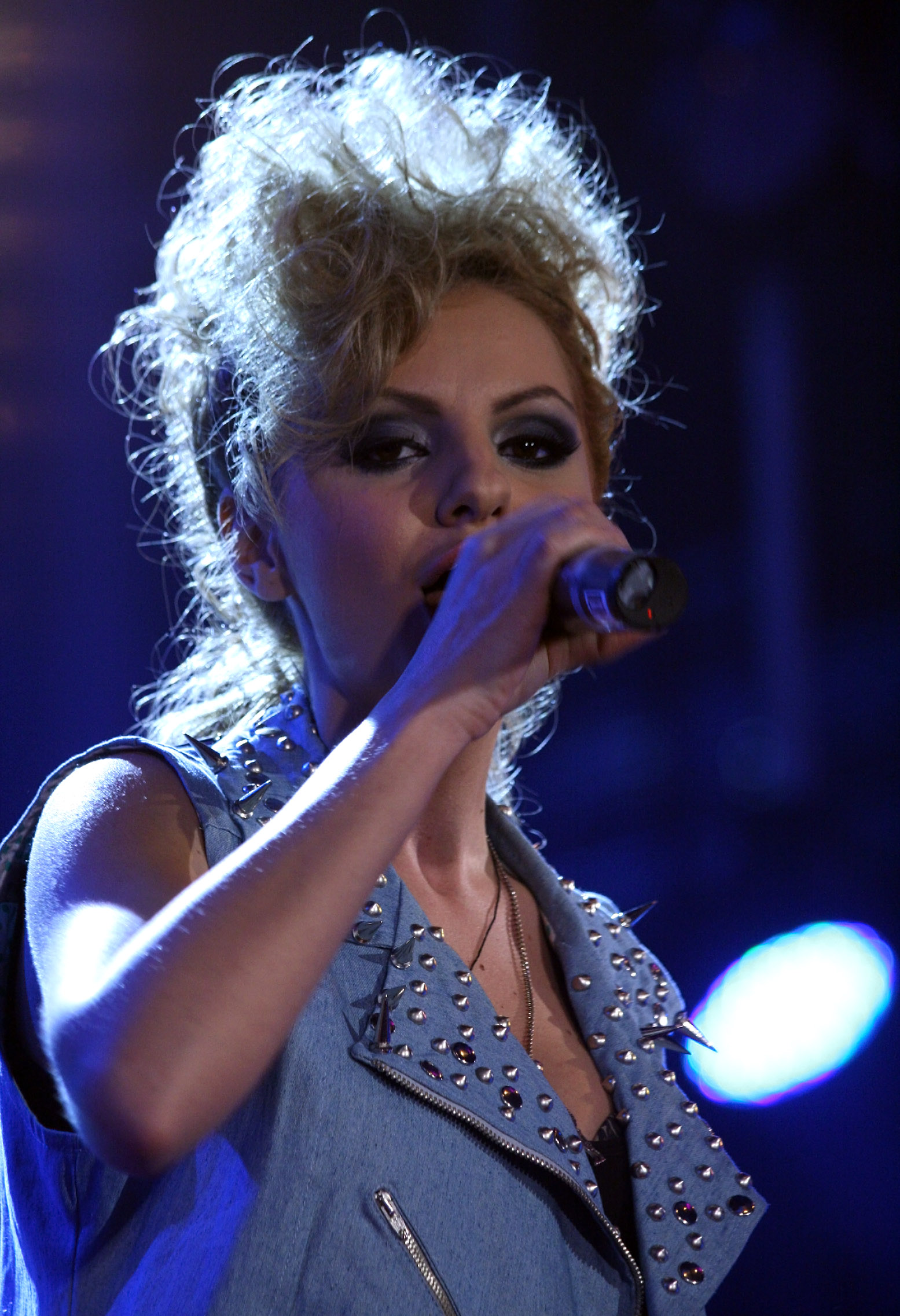
Cotoi co-wrote nine songs on Alexandra Stan's (pictured) studio album Unlocked, including the singles "Dance", "Thanks for Leaving" and "Vanilla Chocolat".

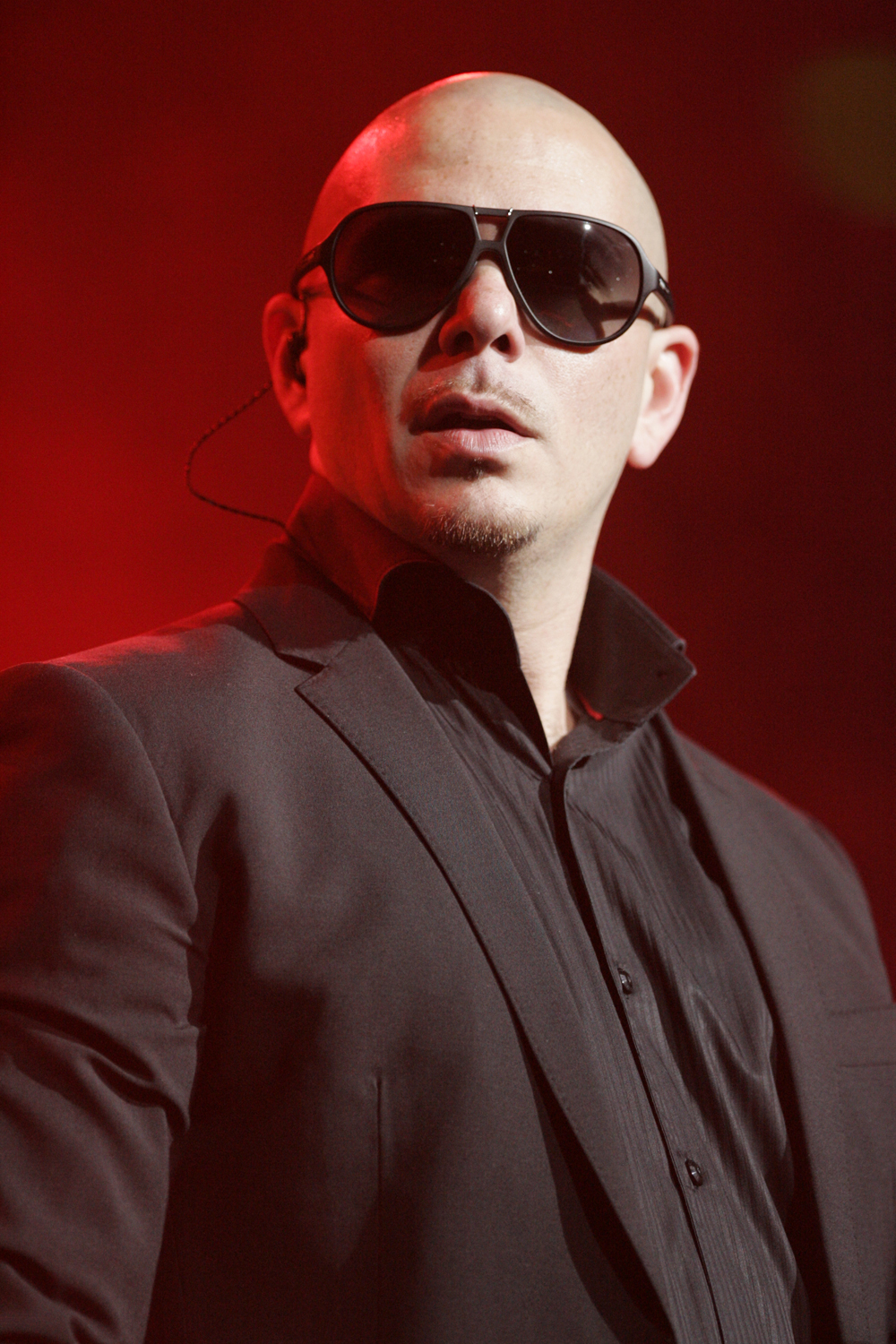
Cotoi was one of the writers of "Baddest Girl in Town", which appears on Pitbull's (pictured) studio album Dale.

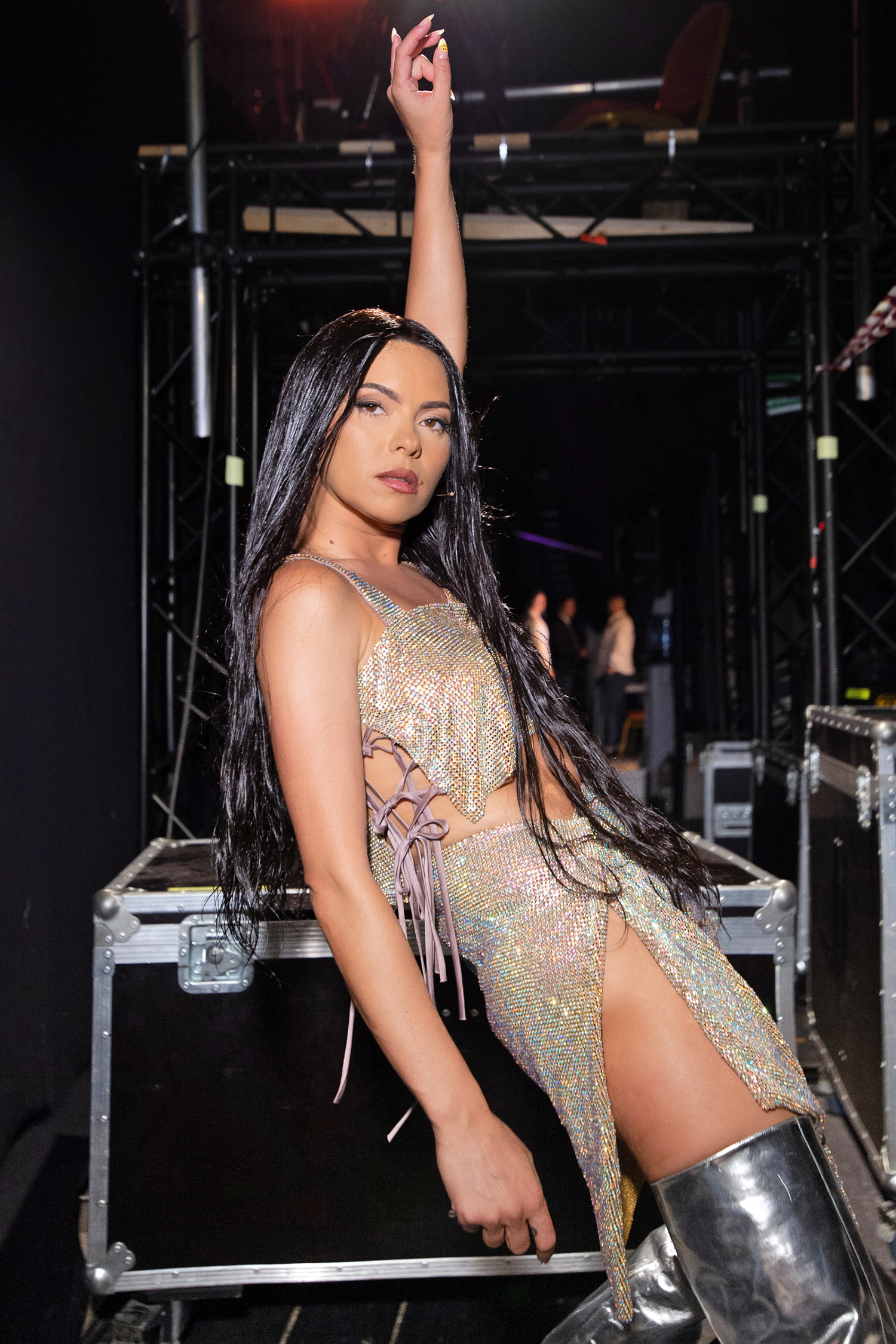
Cotoi has co-written all tracks on Inna's (pictured) 2020 album Heartbreaker. He also co-wrote her 2021 single "Up".

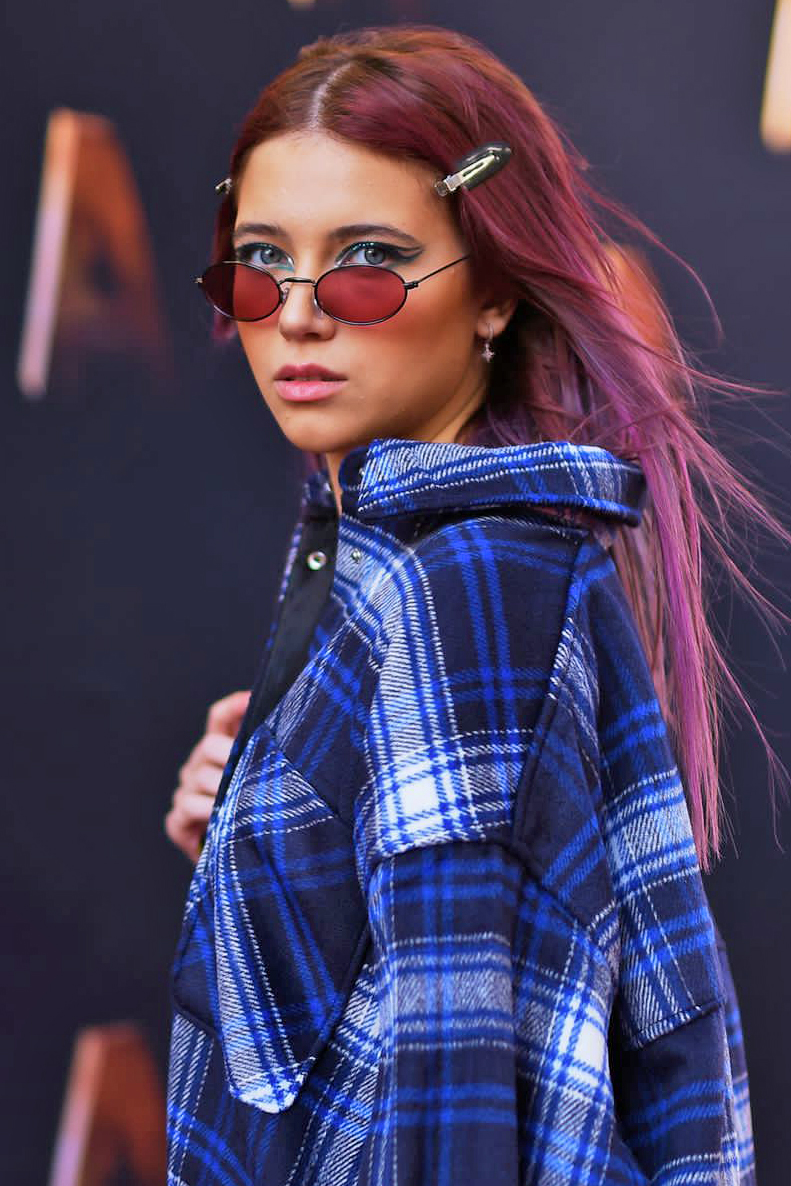
Cotoi wrote two of the tracks that Roxen (pictured) performed at Selecția Națională 2020. The two previously collaborated on "You Don't Love Me".

Key
†	Indicates single release
#	Indicates promotional single release

Song title, artist, writer(s), album of release, and year of release
Song	Artist(s)	Writer(s)	Album	Year	Ref.
"3 luni" #	Alina Eremia	Alexandru Cotoi; Alina Eremia; CSD	The Session	2019	
"24:00" †	Irina Rimes	Alexandru Cotoi; Irina Rimes	Cosmos	2019	
"A mea" †	The Motans	Alexandru Cotoi; Denis Roabeș	—	2021	
"Aasa meri saan"	—	Alexandru Cotoi; Radu Dumitriu; Răzvan Gorcinski; Victor Bourosu	—	2009	
"Abia aștept să nu te mai iubesc"	Irina Rimes	Alexandru Cotoi; Irina Rimes	Acasă	2022	
"Acadele" †	Delia	Alexandru Cotoi; Delia Munteanu	7	2018	
"Acele" †	Carla's Dreams	Alexandru Cotoi; Carla's Dreams	Antiexemplu	2016	
"Addicted" †	Sickotoy featuring Minelli	Alexandru Cotoi; Luisa Luca	—	2019	
"Adio"	Andra	Alexandru Cotoi; Mihai Ristea	Inevitabil va fi bine	2013	
"Alerg spre tine"	—	Alexandru Cotoi; Laura Magori	—	2003	
"Always on My Mind"	Inna	Alexandru Cotoi; Elena Alexandra Apostoleanu; Jordan Shaw; Marcel Botezan; Sebastian Barac	Champagne Problems	2022	
"Amintiri" †	Nicoleta Nucă	Alexandru Cotoi; Carla's Dreams; Claudiu Ursache	—	2016	
"Angels Lullaby" †	Arash featuring Helena	A-Min; Alexandru Cotoi; Anes Bayoudh; Arash; Linnea Deb; Mehdi Mouelhi; Robert Uhlmann	—	2021	
"Animal de pradă" †	Carla's Dreams	Alexandru Cotoi; Carla's Dreams	Antiexemplu	2017	
"Anotimpuri" †	Alina Eremia	Alexandru Cotoi; Alina Eremia; Marcel Botezan; Sebastian Barac	—	2019	
"Antiexemplu" †	Carla's Dreams	Alexandru Cotoi; Carla's Dreams	Antiexemplu	2017	
"Anti CSD" †	Carla's Dreams	Alexandru Cotoi; Carla's Dreams	Antiexemplu	2017	
"Anxietate" †	Carla's Dreams featuring Antonia	Alexandru Cotoi; Carla's Dreams	—	2019	
"Aripile" †	Carla's Dreams	Alexandru Cotoi; Carla's Dreams; Radu Ionatan	Ngoc	2016	
"Aruncă-mă" †	Delia	Alexandru Cotoi; Delia Munteanu	7	2020	
"Astrologic vorbind" †	The Motans	Alexandru Cotoi; Denis Roabeș; Marcel Botezan; Sebastian Barac	—	2020	
"Atât de fain" #	Ami	Alex Ghinea; Alexandru Cotoi; Ami; Florian Rus	The Session	2019	
"Aywa" †	Faydee with Valderrama	Alexandru Cotoi; Faydee; Valderrama	—	2020	
"Baby"	Inna	Alexandru Cotoi; Elena Alexandra Apostoleanu; Minelli; Marcel Botezan; Sebastian Barac	Champagne Problems	2022	
"Back to Light"	Alexandra Stan	Alexandra Stan; Alexandru Cotoi; Anton Kuhl; Lee Anna McCollum; Nazarine Henderson	Unlocked	2014	
"Baddest Girl in Town" †	Pitbull featuring Mohombi and Wisin	Alexandru Cotoi; Armando C. Pérez; Jorge Gómez; José C. Garcia; Juan Luis Morera Luna; Mika Moupondo; Mohombi Moupondo	Dale	2015	
"Bambolina" †	Killa Fonic featuring Carla's Dreams	Alexandru Cotoi; Carla's Dreams; Killa Fonic; Mihai Alexandru Bogdan	—	2019	
"Beautiful Disaster" #	Roxen	Alexandru Cotoi; Breyan Isaac; Julie Frost	—	2020	
"Beautiful Lie"	Inna	Alexandru Cotoi; David Ciente; Elena Alexandra Apostoleanu; Luisa Luca; Marcel Botezan; Sebastian Barac	Heartbreaker	2020	
"Beautiful Life" †	Sore with Mihai Ristea	Alexandru Cotoi; Alexandru Velea; Andrei Maria; Mihai Ristea; Serban Cazan; Sorina Mihalache	—	2013	
"Beautiful World"	—	Alexandru Cotoi; Radu Dumitriu; Răzvan Gorcinski; Victor Bourosu	—	2009	
"Beretta" †	Carla's Dreams	Alexandru Cotoi; Carla's Dreams	—	2017	
"BRB" †	Alina Eremia with Nane	Alexandru Cotoi; Alina Eremia; Costel Dominteanu; Nane	Déjà Vu	2020	
"Breathless"	Inna	Alexandru Cotoi; Elena Alexandra Apostoleanu; Jordan Shaw; Marcel Botezan; Sebastian Barac	Champagne Problems	2022	
"Ca să fii fericit" †	Mark Stam featuring Ami	Alexandru Cotoi; Ami; Mark Stam; Viky Red	—	2019	
"Call 911" †	Sickotoy with Maruv	Alexandru Cotoi; Marcel Botezan; Maruv; Minelli; Sebastian Barac	—	2021	
"Carbon"	—	Alexandru Cotoi; Victor Bourosu	—	Unknown	
"Ce am cu tine" †	Adda	Adda; Alexandru Cotoi	Artă, viață și iubire	2019	
"Ce se întâmplă, doctore?" †	Irina Rimes	Alexandru Cotoi; Irina Rimes	Cosmos	2019	
"Cel din oglindă" †	The Motans	Alexandru Cotoi; Denis Roabeș; Marcel Botezan; Sebastian Barac	—	2020	
"Cel mai bun DJ" †	Irina Rimes featuring The Motans	Alexandru Cotoi; Denis Roabeș; Irina Rimes	Cosmos	2018	
"Cel mai bun prieten" †	Irina Rimes	Alexandru Cotoi; Irina Rimes	Cosmos	2018	
"Celebrate"	Alexandra Stan	Alexandra Stan; Alexandru Cotoi; Ionuț Adrian Radu; Lee Anna McCollum; Nazarine Henderson	Unlocked	2014	
"Champagne Problems"	Inna	Alexandru Cotoi; Elena Alexandra Apostoleanu; Jordan Shaw; Marcel Botezan; Sebastian Barac	Champagne Problems	2022	
"Colors" #	Roxen	Alexandru Cotoi; Breyan Isaac; Julie Frost; Noonie Bao	—	2020	
"Como ¡Ay!" †	Antonia	Alexandru Cotoi; Andrei Mateos; Luisa Luca	—	2020	
"Copiii care au visat greșit" †	The Motans	Alexandru Cotoi; Denis Roabeș	—	2021	
"Cronic" †	Alexia featuring DJ Project	Adi Colceru; Alex Pelin; Alexandru Cotoi; Gino Manzotti	—	2020	
"Cryo"	Inna	Alexandru Cotoi; Elena Alexandra Apostoleanu; Gustav Nyström; Marcel Botezan; Minelli; Sebastian Barac	Champagne Problems	2022	
"Cum era" †	Delia with Nane	Alexandru Cotoi; Delia; Nane	—	2020	
"Cum sună liniștea" †	Iuliana Beregoi	Adelina Stîngă; Alexandru Cotoi; Viky Red	—	2020	
"Dacă dragostea" †	Lora	Ada Alexandra Rizea; Alexandru Cotoi; Bianca Lobda; Diana Ghita; George Idriceanu	—	2020	
"Dance" †	Alexandra Stan	Alexandra Stan; Alexandru Cotoi; Cosmin Basasteanu; Erik Lidbom; Lee Anna McCollum; Mika Moupondo	Unlocked	2014	
"Dancin' to Forget" †	Sickotoy with Randi	Alexandru Cotoi; Randi	—	2021	
"Dans"	Irina Rimes	Alexandru Cotoi; Irina Rimes	Cosmos	2018	
"De azi pââââână de Crăciun" #	Delia	Alexandru Cotoi; Delia Munteanu; Radu-Tiberiu Nantu	—	2019	
"De ce?" †	Mira	Alexandru Cotoi; Florian Rus; Loredana Cavasdan; Mira	Divina	2020	
"Despablito" †	Delia featuring Grasu XXL	Alexandru Cotoi; Delia Munteanu; Dragoș Nichifor	7	2018	
"Din trecut" †	The Motans featuring Alina Eremia	Alexandru Cotoi; Alina Eremia; Denis Roabeș; Marcel Botezan; Sebastian Barac	—	2020	
"Discoteka" †	Minelli with Inna	Alexandru Cotoi; Inna; Marcel Botezan; Minelli; Sebastian Barac	—	2020	
"Don't Let Me Down"	Inna	Alexandru Cotoi; Elena Alexandra Apostoleanu; Marcel Botezan; Minelli; Sebastian Barac	Champagne Problems	2022	
"Don't Say Goodbye" †	Alok with Ilkay Sencan featuring Tove Lo	Alexandru Cotoi; Alok; Ebba Nilsson; Hannah Wilson; Ilkay Sencan; OHYES; Robert Uhlmann	—	2020	
"Dorule"	Irina Rimes	Alexandru Cotoi; Andi Bănică; Irina Rimes	Cosmos	2018	
"Dragoste cu dinți" †	Delia	Alexandru Cotoi; Delia Munteanu	7	2019	
"Dragoste nu-i" †	Alina Eremia	Alexandru Cotoi; Andrei Banica; Dumitru Florin; Viky Red	—	2019	
"Dragostea din plic"	Carla's Dreams	Alexandru Cotoi; Carla's Dreams	Ngoc	2016	
"Drumul"	Irina Rimes	Alexandru Cotoi; Irina Rimes	Acasă	2022	
"Du-te-mă" †	Delia	Alexandru Cotoi; Delia Munteanu	7	2018	
"Dum Dum" †	Sickotoy with Ilkay Sencan	Alexandru Cotoi; Ilkay Sencan; Luisa Luca	—	2020	
"Emotion"	—	Alexandru Cotoi; Cristian Glad Berindei; Radu Dumitriu; Răzvan Gorcinski; Victor Bourosu	—	2009	
"Escape" #	Roxen	Alexandru Cotoi; Marcel Botezan; Minelli; Sebastian Barac; Viky Red	—	2020	
"Fata lu' tata" †	Delia	Alexandru Cotoi; Carla's Dreams	7	2017	
"Fetița mea"	Delia	Alexandru Cotoi; Delia Munteanu	7	2020	
"Fire & Ice"	Inna	Alexandru Cotoi; Elena Alexandra Apostoleanu; Minelli; Marcel Botezan; Sebastian Barac	Champagne Problems	2022	
"Flashbacks" †	Inna	Alexandru Cotoi; David Ciente; Elena Alexandra Apostoleanu; Luisa Luca; Marcel Botezan; Sebastian Barac	Heartbreaker	2020	
"Flori în plete"	Delia	Alexandru Cotoi; Delia Munteanu	7	2020	
"Formula apei"	Carla's Dreams	Alexandru Cotoi; Carla's Dreams	Antiexemplu	2017	
"Frica" †	Carla's Dreams	Alexandru Cotoi; Carla's Dreams	—	2017	
"Fuego" †	Maria Ilieva	Alexandru Cotoi; Andrei Mateos; Luisa Luca; Victor Bourosu	—	2019	
"Gasolina" †	Sickotoy with Em44	Alexandru Cotoi; Arash Labaf; Gabriella Grombacher; Ilkay Sencan; Moh Denebi	—	2020	
"Go Loud"	—	Alexandru Cotoi; Lindy Robbins; Ninos Hanna	—	Unknown	
"Goalie Goalie" †	Arash with Nyusha, Pitbull and Blanco	Alexandru Cotoi; Armando Christian Pérez; Blanco Brown; Cederic Lorrain; Mohombi Moupondo	—	2018	
"Green Light" †	Sickotoy with Aysia and BJ	Alexandru Cotoi; Auri Isaac; Aysia Isaac; Bj Isaac; Breyan Isaac	—	2021	
"Gucci Balenciaga"	Inna	Alexandru Cotoi; Andrés Alcaraz; David Ciente; Elena Alexandra Apostoleanu; Luisa Luca; Marcel Botezan; Sebastian Barac	Heartbreaker	2020	
"Gust amar" †	Carla's Dreams	Alexandru Cotoi; Carla's Dreams	—	2019	
"Heartbreaker"	Inna	Alexandru Cotoi; David Ciente; Elena Alexandra Apostoleanu; Luisa Luca; Marcel Botezan; Sebastian Barac	Heartbreaker	2020	
"Hello" †	Mohombi featuring Youssou N'Dour	Alexandru Cotoi; Linnea Deb; Mohombi Moupondo; Thomas G:son	History	2019	
"Higher"	—	Alexandru Cotoi; Radu Dumitriu; Răzvan Gorcinski; Victor Bourosu	—	2009	
"Hola!" †	Romanian House Mafia with Jade Shadi and Minelli	Alexandru Cotoi; Luisa Luca	—	2021	
"Hold You"	—	Alexandru Cotoi; Radu Dumitriu; Răzvan Gorcinski; Victor Bourosu	—	2009	
"Holding Aces"	Alexandra Stan	Alexandra Stan; Alexandru Cotoi; Angelica Vasilcov; Ionuț Adrian Radu; Kyle Coleman; Lee Anna McCollum; Prince Chrishan	Unlocked	2014	
"Holiday"	Kana Nishino	Alexandru Cotoi; Erik Lidbom; Kana Nishino; Mihai Ristea	Just Love	2016	
"I Think I Love Him" †	Antonia	Adelina Stîngă; Alexandru Cotoi; Petre Octavian Ioachim	—	2021	
"I'm Coming Home" †	Vanotek featuring The Code and Georgian	Adriana Rusu; Alexandru Cotoi; Anastasia Sandu; Ion Chirinciuc; Ionut Catana; Sorin Seniuc	No Sleep	2015	
"Iartă-mă că nu te mai sun prea des"	Irina Rimes	Alexandru Cotoi; Irina Rimes	Acasă	2022	
"Illusion" †	Minelli	Alexandru Cotoi; Minelli	Nostalgic Illusions	2020	
"Imperfect" †	Carla's Dreams	Alexandru Cotoi; Carla's Dreams	Antiexemplu	2016	
"Inima" †	Carla's Dreams featuring Delia	Alexandru Cotoi; Carla's Dreams	Antiexemplu	2017	
"Inima de gheață" †	Zero featuring Alexandra Stan	Alexandru Cotoi; Ionut Bacula; Vlad Manolache	—	2014	
"Inimă nu fi de piatră" †	Roxen	Alexandru Cotoi; Edmond Deda; Harry Negrin; Irina Rimes	—	2021	
"Insula" †	The Motans with Emaa	Alexandru Cotoi; Denis Roabeș; Marcel Botezan; Sebastian Barac	—	2020	
"Iubirea mea" †	Antonia	Alexandru Cotoi; Andrei Banica; Marcel Botezan; Sebastian Barac	—	2017	
"În altă lume" †	Anda Adam	Alexandru Cotoi; Dragos Felix Popescu	—	2018	
"În golul tău" †	The Motans	Alexandru Cotoi; Denis Roabeș	—	2021	
"În locul meu" †	Irina Rimes	Alexandru Cotoi; Costin Bodea; Irina Rimes	Cosmos	2018	
"În palme" †	Irina Rimes	Alexandru Cotoi; Denis Roabeș; Irina Rimes	—	2019	
"În rai" †	Nane with Delia	Alexandru Cotoi; Costel Dominteanu; Nane	—	2021	
"Înainte să ne fi născut" †	The Motans	Alexandru Cotoi; Denis Roabeș	My Rhythm & Soul	2018	
"Între noi" †	Delia	Alexandru Cotoi; Delia Munteanu	—	2021	
"Karma"	Inna	Alexandru Cotoi; Elena Alexandra Apostoleanu; Jordan Shaw; Marcel Botezan; Sebastian Barac	Champagne Problems	2022	
"Kiss Me Goodbye"	Alexandra Stan	Alexandra Stan; Alexandru Cotoi; Mika Moupondo	Unlocked	2014	
"Kiss You"	—	Alexandru Cotoi; Herbert Crichlow; Thomas Troelsen; Vlad Lucan	—	Unknown	
"Kumera"	Inna	Alexandru Cotoi; Elena Alexandra Apostoleanu; Marcel Botezan; Minelli; Sebastian Barac	Champagne Problems	2022	
"La costum" †	Dara	Alexandru Cotoi; Dara; David Ciente; Denis Roabeș	—	2019	
"La nesfârșit" †	The Motans	Alexandru Cotoi; Alexandru Turcu; Denis Roabeș	—	2021	
"Lacrimi" †	Adda	Adda; Alexandru Cotoi	Artă, viață și iubire	2020	
"Lângă tine"	Andra	Alexandru Cotoi; Mihai Ristea	Inevitabil va fi bine	2013	
"Life Speaks to Me" †	Basshunter	Alexandru Cotoi; Jonas Altberg; Lukas Kemesis; Mohombi	—	2021	
"Liniștea" †	Nicoleta Nucă	Alexandru Cotoi; Andrei Prodan; Claudiu Ursache	—	2015	
"Little Lies"	Alexandra Stan	Alexandra Stan; Alexandru Cotoi; Ionut Adrian Radu; Kyle Coleman; Mika Moupondo; Prince Chrishan	Unlocked	2014	
"Lista de păcate" †	Liviu Teodorescu with Killa Fonic and Alina Ceausan	Alexandru Cotoi; Killa Fonic; Liviu Teodorescu; Lu-K Beats	—	2018	
"Loca" †	Minelli featuring Erik Frank	Alexandru Cotoi; Erik Frank; Minelli; Mihai Alexandru Bogdan	—	2020	
"Lonely"	Inna	Alexandru Cotoi; Elena Alexandra Apostoleanu; Minelli; Marcel Botezan; Sebastian Barac	Champagne Problems	2022	
"Lonely Susan" †	Breyan Isaac	Alexandru Cotoi; Breyan Isaac	—	2020	
"Love Bizarre"	Inna	Alexandru Cotoi; Elena Alexandra Apostoleanu; Minelli; Marcel Botezan; Sebastian Barac	Champagne Problems	2022	
"Low Key" †	Nalani with Connect-R	Alexandru Cotoi; Connect-R	—	2021	
"Lucy" †	Killa Fonic	Alexandru Cotoi; Killa Fonic	—	2019	
"Maria" †	Sickotoy with Iraida	Adelina Stîngă; Alexandru Cotoi; Petre Ioachim Octavian	—	2021	
"Mariola" †	Minelli	Alexandru Cotoi; Luisa Luca; Mihai Alexandru Bogdan; PJ	—	2019	
"Maza Jaja"	Inna	Alexandru Cotoi; David Ciente; Elena Alexandra Apostoleanu; Luisa Luca; Marcel Botezan; Sebastian Barac	Heartbreaker	2020	
"Millennium"	Inna	Alexandru Cotoi; Elena Alexandra Apostoleanu; Gustav Nyström; Marcel Botezan; Minelli; Sebastian Barac	Champagne Problems	2022	
"Missin' You"	—	Alexandru Cotoi; Radu Dumitriu; Răzvan Gorcinski; Silviu Paduraru; Victor Bourosu	—	2008	
"My Heart Is Gone" †	Vanotek featuring Yanka	Adriana Rusu; Alexandru Cotoi; Anca Petcu; Ion Chirinciuc; Sorin Seniuc	No Sleep	2015	
"N-avem timp" †	Irina Rimes	Alexandru Cotoi; Irina Rimes	Acasă	2021	
"Navsegda" (Навсегда) †	Irina Rimes featuring Jah Khalib	Alexandru Cotoi; Dara; Irina Rimes; Jah Khalib	Acasă	2021	
"Ne bucurăm în ciuda lor" †	Carla's Dreams	Alexandru Cotoi; Carla's Dreams	Antiexemplu	2016	
"Nena" †	DJ Sava featuring Bárbara Isasi	Alexandru Cotoi; Constantin Sava; Vlad Lucan	—	2017	
"No Sleep" †	Vanotek featuring Minelli	Alexandru Cotoi; Ion Chirinciuc; Luisa Luca	No Sleep	2017	
"Nopți pe net"	—	Alexandru Cotoi; Laura Magori	—	2003	
"Nota de plată" †	The Motans featuring Inna	Alexandru Cotoi; Costin Bodea; Damian Rusu; Denis Roabeș; Elena Alexandra Apostoleanu; Irina Rimes	My Gorgeous Drama Queens / Nirvana	2017	
"Nu pot uita" †	Cristina Vasiu featuring Mika Moupondo	Alexandru Cotoi; Mihai Ristea	—	2013	
"Nu vreau" †	Mahmut Orhan featuring Irina Rimes	Alexandru Cotoi; David Ciente; Irina Rimes; Mahmut Orhan	—	2020	
"Numa numa 2" †	Dan Balan featuring Marley Waters	Alexandru Cotoi; Corey Gibson; Dan Balan; Gabriel Huiban; Marley Waters	Freedom, Pt. 2	2018	
"One Reason"	Inna	Alexandru Cotoi; David Ciente; Elena Alexandra Apostoleanu; Luisa Luca; Marcel Botezan; Sebastian Barac	Heartbreaker	2020	
"Otzl Gltz" †	Delia	Alexandru Cotoi; Delia; Mihai Susma	—	2022	
"Papa" †	Sickotoy with Inna and Elvana Gjata	Adelina Stîngă; Alexandra Apostoleanu; Alexandru Cotoi; Elvana Gjata	—	2021	
"Pașii" †	Mark Stam	Alexandru Cotoi; Mark Stam	—	2020	
"Până la sânge" †	Carla's Dreams	Alexandru Cotoi; Carla's Dreams	Antiexemplu	2017	
"Pentru totdeauna" †	Irina Rimes with Grasu XXL	Alexandru Cotoi; Dara; Grasu XXL; Irina Rimes	Acasă	2021	
"Pernele moi" †	Corina featuring Pacha Man	Alexandru Cotoi; Călin Nicorici; Mihai Ristea	—	2013	
"Ploaia" †	Mihai Ristea featuring Don Baxter	Alexandru Cotoi; Andrei Maria; Costel Istrati; Dorian Micu; Mihai Ristea; Mika Moupondo	—	2015	
"Ploaia mi-a adus iubirea ta"	—	Alexandru Cotoi; Laura Magori	—	2003	
"Povestea unui naufragiat" †	The Motans	Alexandru Cotoi; Denis Roabeș; Marcel Botezan; Sebastian Barac	—	2021	
"Pretty Lady" (Note: The single is merely titled "Pretty Lady" while on ASCAP the song is registered as "Pretty Lady/La noche caliente llego".) †	DJ Valdi featuring Mohombi	Alexander Papadimas; Alexandru Cotoi; Bruno Lopez; Daniel Ambrojo-Erasmo; Jose González Valderas; Mika Moupondo; Mohombi Moupondo	—	2015	
"Promite-mi" †	Dirty Nano featuring Alina Eremia	Alexandru Cotoi; Alina Eremia; Denis Roabeș; George Hora; Marcel Botezan; Sebastian Barac; Tinu Vidaicu	—	2019	
"Racheta" †	Delia	Alexandru Cotoi; Delia Munteanu	—	2021	
"Rămâi" †	Delia featuring The Motans	Alexandru Cotoi; Delia Munteanu; Denis Roabeș	7	2019	
"Rămâi cu bine" †	Delia featuring Macanache	Alexandru Cotoi; Constantin Dinescu; Delia Munteanu	7	2017	
"Ready Set Go"	Inna	Alexandru Cotoi; Elena Alexandra Apostoleanu; Gustav Nyström; Marcel Botezan; Moa Pettersson Hammar; Sebastian Barac	Champagne Problems	2022	
"Red Cadillac" †	DJ Sava with Serena	Alexandru Cotoi; Constantin Sava; Florin Buzea	—	2019	
"Roses"	—	Alexandru Cotoi; Anca Petcu	—	2015	
"Runnin' Out of Love" †	Sickotoy with Nethy Aber	Alexandru Cotoi; Ásdís María Víðarsdóttir; Greg Taro	—	2021	
"S-a dus"	Irina Rimes	Alexandru Cotoi; Irina Rimes	Acasă	2022	
"Said and Done" †	Sickotoy	Alexandru Cotoi; Emilie Adams; Iselin Solheim	—	2022	
"Saint Loneliness" †	The Motans featuring Marea Neagra	Alexandru Cotoi; Denis Roabeș	My Rhythm & Soul	2018	
"Sarea de pe rană"	Irina Rimes	Alexandru Cotoi; Andi Bănică	Cosmos	2018	
"Să-mi cânți" †	Delia	Alexandru Cotoi; Delia Munteanu; Denis Roabeș	7	2019	
"Seară de seară" †	Carla's Dreams	Alexandru Cotoi; Carla's Dreams; Marcel Botezan; Sebastian Barac	—	2019	
"Set Me Free"	Alexandra Stan featuring Grano	Alexandru Cotoi; Ionuț Adrian Radu; Mika Moupondo	Unlocked	2014	
"Sigur" †	The Motans	Alexandru Cotoi; Denis Roabeș; Mihai Alexandru Bogdan	—	2020	
"Snake Dance" †	Forever Kids with Sickotoy	Alexandru Cotoi; Dimitris Beltsos; Gabriel Russel; Hannah Wilson; Julia Fabrin; Loukas Damianakos; Pavlos Manilos	—	2020	
"So Cold"	—	Alexandru Cotoi; Cristian Glad Berindei; Radu Dumitriu; Răzvan Gorcinski; Victor Bourosu	—	2009	
"Solo"	Inna	Alexandru Cotoi; Elena Alexandra Apostoleanu; Minelli; Marcel Botezan; Sebastian Barac	Champagne Problems	2022	
"Strada ta" †	Roxen with Nane	Alexandru Cotoi; Nane; Roxen	—	2021	
"Sub pielea mea" †	Carla's Dreams	Alexandru Cotoi; Carla's Dreams	Ngoc	2016	
"Sună-mă" †	Carla's Dreams featuring Antonia	Alexandru Cotoi; Carla's Dreams	Ngoc	2016	
"Sunset Dinner"	Inna	Alexandru Cotoi; David Ciente; Elena Alexandra Apostoleanu; Luisa Luca; Marcel Botezan; Sebastian Barac	Heartbreaker	2020	
"Sunt a nimănui"	Irina Rimes	Alexandru Cotoi; Irina Rimes	Acasă	2022	
"Switch Sides"	—	Alexandru Cotoi; Breyan Isaac; Mzwethwu Ngubane	—	Unknown	
"Tag"	—	Alexandru Cotoi; Breyan Isaac; Daniel Kyriakides; David Ciente; Julie Frost	—	2020	
"Take Me Home"	Inna	Alexandru Cotoi; Elena Alexandra Apostoleanu; Marcel Botezan; Moa Petterson Hammar; Sebastian Barac	Champagne Problems	2022	
"Taie"	Irina Rimes	Alexandru Cotoi; Irina Rimes	Acasă	2022	
"Tare" †	The Motans with Inna	Alexandru Cotoi; Denis Roabeș; Elena Alexandra Apostoleanu; Marcel Botezan; Sebastian Barac	—	2022	
"Thanks for Leaving" †	Alexandra Stan	Alexandru Cotoi; Lee Anna McCollum; Nazarine Henderson; Sebastian Jacome	Unlocked	2014	
"Thicky"	Inna	Alexandru Cotoi; David Ciente; Elena Alexandra Apostoleanu; Luisa Luca; Marcel Botezan; Nicole Ariana; Sebastian Barac	Heartbreaker	2020	
"Till Forever"	Inna	Alexandru Cotoi; David Ciente; Elena Alexandra Apostoleanu; Luisa Luca; Marcel Botezan; Sebastian Barac	Heartbreaker	2020	
"Toate drumurile" †	The Motans	Alexandru Cotoi; Denis Roabeș; Marcel Botezan; Sebastian Barac	—	2022	
"Too Deep" †	Sickotoy with Eva Timush	Alexandru Cotoi; Minelli; Will Matta	—	2022	
"Touché" †	Sickotoy with Misha Miller	Alexandru Cotoi; Marcel Botezan; Minelli; Mohombi Moupondo; Sebastian Barac	—	2020	
"Trăiește frumos" †	Delia	Alexandru Cotoi; Delia Munteanu; Irina Rimes	7	2019	
"Treugol'niki" (Треугольники) †	Carla's Dreams	Alexandru Cotoi; Carla's Dreams	Antiexemplu	2016	
"Tu și eu" †	Carla's Dreams featuring Inna	Alexandru Cotoi; Carla's Dreams	Antiexemplu	2017	
"Ultima oară" †	Mark Stam	Alexandru Cotoi; Irina Kupko; Mark Stam	—	2019	
"Un altfel de ieri"	Irina Rimes	Alexandru Cotoi; Irina Rimes; Ștefan Stoica	Acasă	2022	
"Unde" †	Carla's Dreams	Alexandru Cotoi; Carla's Dreams	Antiexemplu	2016	
"Unde-s doi"	Andra	Alexandru Cotoi; Serban Cazan; Synthetic	Iubirea schimbă tot	2017	
"Universe (Let's Play Ball)" †	NCT	Alexandru Cotoi; Breyan Isaac; Carlos Battey; Dem Jointz; Kenzie; Ryan S. Jhun; Marcel Botezan; Mark; Wayne Hector	Universe	2021	
"Unlocked"	Alexandra Stan	Alexandra Stan; Alexandru Cotoi; Mika Moupondo; Victor Bourosu	Unlocked	2014	
"Up" †	Inna	Alexandru Cotoi; Elena Alexandra Apostoleanu; Marcel Botezan; Minelli; Sebastian Barac	—	2021	
"Valuri mari" †	The Motans	Alexandru Cotoi; Ali Said; Denis Roabeș; Marcel Botezan; Sebastian Barac	My Rhythm & Soul	2019	
"Vanilla Chocolat" †	Alexandra Stan featuring Connect-R	Alexandra Stan; Alexandru Cotoi; Mika Moupondo; Constantin Sava; Ștefan Mihalache	Unlocked	2014	
"Verde împărat" †	Delia	Alexandru Cotoi; Delia Munteanu	7	2017	
"Viajero" †	Vanotek featuring Hevito	Adriana Rusu; Alexandru Cotoi; Ion Chirinciuc; Ionut Catana; Manuel Severino	No Sleep	2016	
"VKTM" †	Sickotoy with Inna and TAG	Alexandru Cotoi; Breyan Isaac	—	2020	
"Vreau la țară" †	Delia	Alexandru Cotoi; Delia Munteanu; Mircea Baniciu	7	2019	
"Weekend" †	The Motans featuring Delia	Alexandru Cotoi; Denis Roabeș	7 / My Gorgeous Drama Queens	2017	
"Why" †	Wrs	Alexandru Cotoi; Wrs	—	2020	
"Without You" †	Andra featuring David Bisbal	Alexandru Cotoi; Andra; David Bisbal; Mika Moupondo; Mohombi Moupondo; Ninos Hanna	—	2016	
"You and I"	Inna	Alexandru Cotoi; David Ciente; Elena Alexandra Apostoleanu; Luisa Luca; Marcel Botezan; Nicole Ariana; Sebastian Barac	Heartbreaker	2020	
"You Don't Love Me" †	Sickotoy featuring Roxen	Alexandru Cotoi; Marcel Botezan; Minelli; Sebastian Barac	—	2019	
"Your Love" †	Irina Rimes with Cris Cab	Alexandru Cotoi; Cris Cab; Irina Rimes	—	2021	
