= Irra =

Irra can refer to:

- IRRA, The Institute of Russian Realist Art
- Lugal-Irra, a Sumerian, Babylonian, and Akkadian god
- IRRA, an acronym in economics, finance, and decision theory for increasing relative risk aversion
- IRRA, former pseudonym of Romanian singer and songwriter Irina Rimes
