= Vocea României season 10 =

Season of television series Vocea României

Vocea României
- Season 10
- Hosted by: Pavel Bartoș
- Coaches: Tudor Chirilă; Denis 'The Motans'; Irina Rimes; Smiley & Theo Rose
- Winner: Iulian Nunucă
- Winning coach: Tudor Chirilă
- Runner-up: Andra Botez
- No. of episodes: 16

Release
- Original network: ProTV
- Original release: September 9 – December 23, 2022

Season chronology
- ← Previous; Season 9 Next → Vocea României (season 11)

The tenth season of the Romanian reality talent show Vocea României premiered on ProTV on September 9, 2022. Irina Rimes and Tudor Chirilă returned as coaches, while Denis 'The Motans' replaced Horia Brenciu. Smiley was joined by Theo Rose, for the first time in the history of the contest there being a double-coached team. Meanwhile, Pavel Bartoș returned for his tenth season as host. Iulia Pârlea acted as the green room host during the live shows.

The season finale aired on December 23, 2022. Iulian Nunucă, mentored by Tudor Chirilă, was declared winner of the season. It was Tudor's fifth victory as a coach.

== Auditions ==
Cities where the pre-selections were held.

The open call auditions were held in the following locations:

Date	Audition venue	Location
March 20, 2022	Hotel Ibis Timisoara City Center	Timișoara
March 27, 2022	Hotel Unirea	Iași
April 3, 2022	Golden Tulip Ana Dome	Cluj-Napoca
April 9–10, 2022	Hotel World Trade Center	Bucharest

== Teams ==
Color key

- Winner
- Runner-up
- Third place
- Fourth place
- Eliminated in the Live Shows
- Eliminated in the Knockout rounds
- Stolen in the Battle rounds
- Eliminated in the Battle rounds
- Eliminated after the Auditions

Coaches	Top 67 artists				
Tudor Chirilă					
Tudor Chirilă	Iulian Nunucă	Ioana Vecerdea	Valeria Marcu	Ionuț Panait	Alexander Buchanan
Tudor Chirilă	Dana Borteanu	Mihailina Moisa	Delia Racu	Ruxandra Istrate	~~Carmen Cușa~~
Tudor Chirilă	~~Bogdan Jeler~~	Liliana Radu	Valeria Condrea	Adriana Gîrneț	Maria Niță
Tudor Chirilă	Daniel Ignat	Clarissa Vichi (Note: Left the show on her own accord.)			
Irina Rimes					
Irina Rimes	Andra Botez	Rianna Rusu	Theo Rusu	Alexandrina Vlad	Ricardo Gabor
Irina Rimes	Daria Pintilie	Denisa Avram	Bogdan Jeler	Carmen Cușa	~~Marina Nanava~~
Irina Rimes	~~Ionuț Panait~~	~~Magda Suciu~~	~~Valeria Marcu~~	Mara Berechet	Valeria Engalîceva
Irina Rimes	Monica Costin	Robert Bagameri	Cătălina Hrișcă	Ana Doană	Amalia Moise
Smiley & Theo Rose					
Smiley & Theo Rose	Winaël Baldus	Eduard Stoica	Vlad Nicolici	Andreas Mioc	Jessica Lăzărescu
Smiley & Theo Rose	Veronica Liberati	Magda Suciu	Andra Pierșinaru	Sofia Mărculescu	~~Kam Cayahadi~~
Smiley & Theo Rose	Simona Mareș	Laszlo Janoska	Max Jorquera	Ștefania Vorovenci	Mihaela Frimu
Smiley & Theo Rose	Marina Scalețchi	Adrian Ivan	Ana Mardare	Emanuel Bădilaș	Vlad Gheorghe
Denis 'The Motans'					
Denis 'The Motans'	Teodor Debu	Anastasia Budeșteanu	Kam Cahayadi	Marina Nanava	Alexandra Șipoș
Denis 'The Motans'	Corina Ivanov	Daniel Ciurea	Laura Oana	Smaranda Marian	~~Vlad Nicolici~~
Denis 'The Motans'	Diana Guia	Iulia Gîza	Elis Opriș	Ovidiu Gorincioi	Cristina & Victor Sîrbu
Denis 'The Motans'	Claudiu Mirică	Nicoleta Fiodorov	Cecilia Șerban		
Note: Italicized names are stolen contestants (names struck through within former teams).

== Blind Auditions ==
The show began with the Blind Auditions on September 9, 2022. In each audition, an artist sings their piece in front of the coaches whose chairs are facing the audience. If a coach is interested to work with the artist, they will press their button to face the artist. If a singular coach presses the button, the artist automatically becomes part of their team. If multiple coaches turn, they will compete for the artist, who will decide which team they will join. Each coach has one "block" to prevent another coach from getting an artist. This season, the coaches complete their teams without a specific number of members. However, each one will be cut down to 14 contestants, on the last episode of the blinds.

Color key

✔	Coach pressed "I WANT YOU" button
✔	Artist defaulted to a coach's team
✔	Artist elected a coach's team
	Artist was eliminated as no coach pressed their button
	Artist joined the team but was eliminated before the Battles
✘	Coach pressed the "I want you" button, but was blocked by Tudor from getting the artist
✘	Coach pressed the "I want you" button, but was blocked by Irina from getting the artist
✘	Coach pressed the "I want you" button, but was blocked by Smiley & Theo from getting the artist
✘	Coach pressed the "I want you" button, but was blocked by Denis from getting the artist

=== Episode 1 (September 9) ===
The first episode aired on September 9, 2022. The coaches performed "Imagine" at the start of the show.

Order	Artist	Age	Hometown	Song	Coach's and artist's choices			
Order	Artist	Age	Hometown	Song	Tudor	Irina	Smiley & Theo	Denis
1	Carmen Cușa	20	Constanța, Constanța	"Love Bites"	✔	✔	✔	✔
2	Anastasia Jinga	21	Bucharest	"Bitch"	—	—	—	—
3	Dana Borteanu	55	Timișoara, Timiș	"New York, New York"	✔	✔	✔	✔
4	Vanessa Oriaku	17	Arad, Arad	"Cântă cucu"	—	—	—	—
5	Elis Opriș	27	Mangalia, Constanța	"Crazy"	—	—	—	✔
6	Mihailina Moisa	24	Brussels, Belgium	"Dog Days Are Over"	✔	✔	✔	—
7	Carmine del Duca	41	Cluj-Napoca, Cluj	"Cose della vita"	—	—	—	—
8	Valeria Marcu	21	Chișinău, Moldova	"Rabdă inimă"	✔	✔	✔	✔
9	Ricardo Gabor	23	Almería, Spain	"Yo Viviré"	—	✔	✔	✔
10	Winaël Baldus	24	Sibiu, Sibiu	"Dance Monkey"	✔	✔	✔	✔

=== Episode 2 (September 16) ===
The second episode aired on September 16, 2022.

Order	Artist	Age	Hometown	Song	Coach's and artist's choices			
Order	Artist	Age	Hometown	Song	Tudor	Irina	Smiley & Theo	Denis
1	Federica Raimo	26	Naples, Italy	"The Show Must Go On"	—	—	—	—
2	Eduard Stoica	16	Olari, Prahova	"Legendary"	—	✔	✔	—
3	Aurora Broscăreanu	—	London, United Kingdom	"Price Tag"	—	—	—	—
4	Marina Nanava	21	Kharkiv, Ukraine	"1944"	—	✔	—	✔
5	Cristina & Victor Sîrbu	—	Chișinău, Moldova	"Uptown Funk"	—	✔	—	✔
6	Nicoleta Olah	20	Oradea, Bihor	"Everybody Loves An Outlaw"	—	—	—	—
7	Corina Ivanov	24	Bucharest	"Hora din Moldova"	✔	—	—	✔
8	Michael Arnold	42	Sibiu, Sibiu	"Chasing Cars"	—	—	—	—
9	Ana Mardare	42	Galați, Galați	"Like I'm Gonna Lose You"	—	✔	✔	✔
10	Alexander Buchanan	32	Manchester, United Kingdom	"Man In The Mirror"	✔	✔	✘	✔
11	Ruxandra Istrate	19	Pitești, Argeș	"Fever"	✔	✔	—	✔

=== Episode 3 (September 23) ===
The third episode aired on September 23, 2022.

Order	Artist	Age	Hometown	Song	Coach's and artist's choices			
Order	Artist	Age	Hometown	Song	Tudor	Irina	Smiley & Theo	Denis
1	Smaranda Marian	22	Bucharest	"Location"	✔	✔	✔	✔
2	Liliana Radu	53	Constanța, Constanța	"Give Me One Reason"	✔	✘	✔	✔
3	Daniel Ciurea	18	Chișinău, Moldova	"Jealous"	✔	✔	✔	✔
4	Maria Tomescu	20	Drăgășani, Vâlcea	"California Dreamin'"	—	—	—	—
5	Felicia Gurău	36	Focșani, Vrancea	"Constantine, Constantine"	—	—	—	—
6	Marina Scalețchi	19	Chișinău, Moldova	"The Scientist"	—	✘	✔	✔
7	Shahin Dehghani	27	Brăila, Brăila	"La La La"	—	—	—	—
8	Adriana Gîrneț	35	Bucharest	"Somebody That I Used to Know"	✔	—	—	—
9	Max Jorquera	20	London, United Kingdom	"Cry Me A River"	✔	—	✔	✔
10	Andra Botez	38	Iași, Iași	"Spain" & "Que Sera Sera"	✘	✔	✔	✔

=== Episode 4 (September 30) ===
The fourth episode aired on September 30, 2022.

Order	Artist	Age	Hometown	Song	Coach's and artist's choices			
Order	Artist	Age	Hometown	Song	Tudor	Irina	Smiley & Theo	Denis
1	Anastasia Budeșteanu	20	Galați, Galați	"Cuz I Love You"	✔	✔	✔	✔
2	Elie Raymond	33	Paris, France	"Without You"	—	—	—	—
3	Alexandrina Vlad	36	Bucharest	"Love Is A Lie"	—	✔	—	✔
4	Ana Doană	17	Craiova, Dolj	"Cine te crezi?"	—	✔		
5	Valeria Condrea	29	Paris, France	"Blue (Da Ba Dee)"	✔	✔	✔	✔
6	Irina Șciogoleva	47	Chișinău, Moldova	"Strangers in the Night"	—	—	—	—
7	Nadejda Crajevschi	21	Chișinău, Moldova	"Something's Got a Hold on Me"	—	—	—	—
8	Laszlo Janoska	41	Sângeorgiu de Pădure, Mureș	"Oameni"	—	✔	✔	—
9	Kam Cahayadi	35	Milan, Italy	"Can't Stop the Feeling!"	✔	✔	✔	✔
10	Dana Dobre	42	Buzău, Buzău	"Dragostea rămâne"	—	—	—	—
11	Clarissa Vichi	38	Fano, Italy	"Kiss"	✔	✔	✔	✔
12	Teodor Debu	22	Bucharest	"Make It Rain"	—	✔	—	✔

=== Episode 5 (October 7) ===
The fifth episode aired on October 7, 2022.

Order	Artist	Age	Hometown	Song	Coach's and artist's choices			
Order	Artist	Age	Hometown	Song	Tudor	Irina	Smiley & Theo	Denis
1	Adrian Ivan	18	Brașov, Brașov	"Great Balls of Fire"	—	✔	✔	—
2	Delia Racu	17	Onești, Bacău	"Dancing With The Devil"	✔	✔	✔	—
3	Vlad Nicolici	27	Bucharest	"Scream"	—	✔	—	✔
4	Elena Unc	41	Arad, Arad	"Of, inimoară"	—	—	—	—
5	Iulia Gîza	18	Vaslui, Vaslui	"You Say"	—	—	—	✔
6	Zorina & Vanessa Bălan	37, 17	Craiova, Dolj	"I Know Him So Well"	—	—	—	—
7	Rianna Rusu	16	Pașcani, Iași	"Purple Rain"	—	✔	✔	✔
8	Laura Oana	—	Baia Mare, Maramureș	"Seven Nation Army"	✔	✔	✔	✔
9	Veronica Liberati	29	Rome, Italy	"Bună seara, iubito!"	✔	✔	✔	✔
10	Iulian Nunucă	18	Moțca, Iași	"The Prayer"	✔	✔	—	—

=== Episode 6 (October 14) ===
The sixth episode aired on October 14, 2022.

Order	Artist	Age	Hometown	Song	Coach's and artist's choices			
Order	Artist	Age	Hometown	Song	Tudor	Irina	Smiley & Theo	Denis
1	Andra Pierșinaru	17	Dragomirești Deal, Ilfov	"Strange"	✔	✔	✔	✔
2	Robert Bagameri	29	Gherla, Cluj	"Train Wreck"	—	✔	—	—
3	Antonia Rădulescu	17	Timișoara, Timiș	"Shake It Off"	—	—	—	—
4	Theo Rusu	31	Bucharest	"Colors"	—	✔	—	✔
5	Simona Mareș	17	Bucharest	"The Jazz Channel, Chaka Khan Bet On Jazz"	✔	✔	✔	✔
6	Andreas Mioc	19	Bad Rappenau, Germany	"Writing's On The Wall"	—	✔	✔	—
7	Diana Guia	19	Lupeni, Hunedoara	"Sfârșitul Lumii"	—	—	—	✔
8	Ionuț Petre	27	Breaza, Prahova	"The Reason"	—	—	—	—
9	Ioana Vecerdea	18	Sibiu, Sibiu	"History Repeating"	✔	✔	—	—
10	Emanuel Bădilaș	18	Isaccea, Tulcea	"She's On My Mind"	✔	✔	✔	—
11	Andra Grădinariu	16	Botoșani, Botoșani	"Cosmos"	—	—	—	—
12	Claudiu Mirică	47	Paris, France	"Voilà"	—	✔	—	✔

=== Episode 7 (October 21) ===
The seventh episode aired on October 21, 2022.

Order	Artist	Age	Hometown	Song	Coach's and artist's choices			
Order	Artist	Age	Hometown	Song	Tudor	Irina	Smiley & Theo	Denis
1	Magda Suciu	17	Bistrița, Bistrița-Năsăud	"I Am Woman"	—	✔	✔	—
2	Bogdan Jeler	33	Brașov, Brașov	"Doin' This"	✔	✔	—	—
3	Amalia Moise	16	Bucharest	"Summertime"	—	✔	—	—
4	Daria Cojocaru	18	Craiova, Dolj	"Ziua Vrăjitoarelor"	—	—	—	—
5	Vlad Gheorghe	30	Bucharest	"Ain't No Sunshine"	✔	✔	✔	—
6	Valeria Engalîceva	23	Bălți, Moldova	"Mama Do (Uh Oh, Uh Oh)"	—	✔	—	✔
7	Ramona Bocioacă	39	Baden-Württemberg, Germany	"All the Man That I Need"	—	—	—	—
8	Monica Costin	27	Bucharest	"The Chain"	—	✔	—	✔
9	Marius Barbu	25	Bușteni, Prahova	"În umbra marelui urs"	—	—	—	—
10	Cecilia Șerban	20	Cluj-Napoca, Cluj	"Ironic"	—	—	—	✔
11	Daniel Ignat	44	Făgăraș, Brașov	"Back in Black"	✔	—	—	✔
12	Ida Decenvirale	47	Slobozia, Ialomița	"Cabaret"	—	—	—	—
13	Ionuț Panait	21	Arad, Arad	"Diamonds"	✔	✔	—	—

=== Episode 8 (October 28) ===
The eighth episode aired on October 28, 2022.

Order	Artist	Age	Hometown	Song	Coach's and artist's choices			
Order	Artist	Age	Hometown	Song	Tudor	Irina	Smiley & Theo	Denis
1	Maria Niță	17	Baia Mare, Maramureș	"Caught Out In The Rain"	✔	✔	—	✔
2	Teodor Cauș	19	Timișoara, Timiș	"Redbone"	—	—	—	—
3	Cătălina Hrișcă	28	Bucharest	"If I Ain't Got You"	—	✔	✔	—
4	Nicoleta Fiodorov	31	Iași, Iași	"Mercy"	—	✔		✔
5	Alexandru Carabețchi	25	Chișinău, Moldova	"Budapest"	—	—	—	—
6	Denisa Avram	18	Buzău, Buzău	"Break My Heart"	—	✔	✔	✔
7	Irem Ilgin	16	Bucharest	"Wicked Game"	—	—	—	—
8	Ovidiu Gorincioi	18	Chișinău, Moldova	"Way Down We Go"	—	✔	—	✔
9	Bianca Sumanariu	25	Bucharest	"Raggamuffin"	—	—	—	—
10	Mara Berechet	17	Constanța, Constanța	"My Mind"	—	✔	—	✔
11	Daria Pintilie	17	Piatra Neamț, Neamț	"Ain't No Other Man"	✔	✔	✔	✔

=== Episode 9 (November 4) ===
The ninth episode aired on November 4, 2022.

Order	Artist	Age	Hometown	Song	Coach's and artist's choices			
Order	Artist	Age	Hometown	Song	Tudor	Irina	Smiley & Theo	Denis
1	Ștefania Vorovenci	25	Brașov, Brașov	"Upside Down"	—	✔	✔	—
2	Andra Lupu	32	Bucharest	"Love on the Brain"	—	—	—	—
3	Alexandra Șipoș	26	Bucharest	"Stand Up"	—	✔	—	✔
4	Marian Michiu	27	Bucharest	"I'm Not the Only One"	—	—	—	—
5	Mihaela Frimu	—	Chișinău, Moldova	"Left Outside Alone"	—	—	✔	—
6	Marina Anghel	27	Bucharest	"Tu n-ai avut curaj"	—	—	—	—
7	Sofia Mărculescu	28	Cluj-Napoca, Cluj	"Down On My Knees"	—	✔	✔	✔
8	Andreea Săraru	18	Bucharest	"Jolene"	—	—	—	—
9	Jessica Lăzărescu	18	Târgu Jiu, Gorj	"Runnin'"	—	✔	✔	✔

== The Battles ==
For this season, the battles aired after the blind auditions. Coaches are allowed to steal two artists from other teams. Artist who won their battle or stolen by their coach will advance to the knockouts.

Color key:

Artist won the Battle and advanced to the Knockouts
Artist lost the Battle but was stolen by another coach and advanced to the Knockouts
Artist lost the Battle and was eliminated

=== Episode 10 (November 11) ===
The tenth episode aired on November 11, 2022.

Coach	Order	Winner	Song	Loser	'Steal' result			
Coach	Order	Winner	Song	Loser	Tudor	Irina	Smiley & Theo	Denis
Tudor Chirilă	1	Iulian Nunucă	"Lay Me Down"	Bogdan Jeler	∅	✔	—	✔
Smiley & Theo	2	Eduard Stoica	"Watermelon Sugar"	Mihaela Frimu	—	—	∅	—
Irina	3	Alexandrina Vlad	"Feeling Good"	Magda Suciu	—	∅	✔	—
Denis	4	Alexandra Șipoș	"Arcade"	Cristina & Victor Sîrbu	—	—	—	∅
Tudor	5	Ioana Vecerdea	"Love Yourself"	Maria Niță	∅	—	—	—
Smiley & Theo	6	Sofia Mărculescu	"Running Up That Hill"	Marina Scalețchi	—	—	∅	—
Denis	7	Teodor Debu	"Use Somebody"	Claudiu Mirică	—	—	—	∅
Irina	8	Andra Botez	"Bordeiaș"	Valeria Marcu	✔	∅	✔	—

=== Episode 11 (November 18) ===
The eleventh episode aired on November 18, 2022.

Coach	Order	Winner	Song	Loser	'Steal' result			
Coach	Order	Winner	Song	Loser	Tudor	Irina	Smiley & Theo	Denis
Smiley & Theo	1	Winaël Baldus	"Forget You"	Kam Cahayadi	✔	✔	∅	✔
Tudor	2	Alexander Buchanan	"Last Night Of The World"	Adriana Gîrneț	∅	—	—	—
Irina	3	Theo Rusu	"River"	Monica Costin	—	∅	—	—
Smiley & Theo	4	Andreas Mioc	"Dusk Till Dawn"	Ștefania Vorovenci	—	—	∅	—
Tudor	5	Ruxandra Istrate	"Lonely Boy"	Daniel Ignat	∅	—	—	—
Irina	6	Rianna Rusu	"Mamma Knows Best"	Valeria Engalîceva	—	∅	—	—
Denis	7	Anastasia Budeșteanu	"i love you"	Ovidiu Gorincioi	—	—	—	∅
Tudor	8	Delia Racu	"Suspicious Minds"	Valeria Condrea	∅	—	—	—
Irina	9	Ricardo Gabor	"Lady Marmalade"	Mara Berechet	—	∅	—	—
Denis	10	Laura Oana	"Roata morii se-nvârtește"	Vlad Nicolici	✔	—	✔	∅

=== Episode 12 (November 25) ===
The twelfth episode aired on November 25, 2022.

Coach	Order	Winner	Song	Loser	'Steal' result			
Coach	Order	Winner	Song	Loser	Tudor	Irina	Smiley & Theo	Denis
Smiley & Theo	1	Jessica Lăzărescu	"You Are the Reason"	Max Jorquera	—	—	∅	—
Tudor	2	Dana Borteanu	"New Orleans"	Liliana Radu	∅	—	—	—
Denis	3	Corina Ivanov	"Nothing Breaks Like A Heart"	Elis Opriș	—	—	—	∅
Irina	4	Denisa Avram	"Skinny Love"	Ionuț Panait	✔	∅	—	—
Smiley & Theo	5	Veronica Liberati	"Unchained Melody"	Laszlo Janoska	—	—	∅	—
Denis	6	Daniel Ciurea	"Let Me Entertain You"	Iulia Gîza	—	—	—	∅
Irina	7	Daria Pintilie	"Crazy"	Marina Nanava	✔	∅	—	✔
Tudor	8	Mihailina Moisa	"Army Of Me"	Carmen Cușa	∅	✔	—	—
Denis	9	Smaranda Marian	"Impossible"	Diana Guia	—	—	—	∅
Smiley & Theo	10	Andra Pierșinaru	"Sweet Child O' Mine"	Simona Mareș	—	—	∅	—

== Knockout rounds ==
The remaining nine artists from each team were split up into three groups of three. At the end of each knockout round the coach then decided out of the three artists one of them who won, and therefore made up their three artists to take to the live shows.

Colour key:

Artist won the Knockouts and advanced to the Live shows
Artist lost the Knockouts and was eliminated

=== Episode 13 (December 2) ===
The thirteenth episode aired on December 2, 2022.

Episode 13 (December 2)
Coach	Order	Artist	Song	Result
Smiley & Theo	1	Veronica Liberati	"It's Raining Men"	Eliminated
Smiley & Theo	2	Magda Suciu	"Addicted To You"	Eliminated
Smiley & Theo	3	Winaël Baldus	"A Song For You"	Advanced
Denis	4	Laura Oana	"You Shook Me All Night Long"	Eliminated
Denis	5	Smaranda Marian	"Deeper"	Eliminated
Denis	6	Teodor Debu	"Beggin'"	Advanced
Irina	7	Alexandrina Vlad	"Born This Way"	Eliminated
Irina	8	Ricardo Gabor	"Amar Pelos Dois"	Eliminated
Irina	9	Andra Botez	"Hey Jude"	Advanced
Tudor	10	Delia Racu	"Here Comes The Sun"	Eliminated
Tudor	11	Valeria Marcu	"Your Song"	Advanced
Tudor	12	Ruxandra Istrate	"Break On Through"	Eliminated
Irina	13	Bogdan Jeler	"War Pigs"	Eliminated
Irina	14	Carmen Cușa	"Nu am chef azi"	Eliminated
Irina	15	Rianna Rusu	"Whole Lotta Love"	Advanced
Tudor	16	Ionuț Panait	"Fragile"	Eliminated
Tudor	17	Alexander Buchanan	"Many Rivers To Cross"	Eliminated
Tudor	18	Ioana Vecerdea	"Enter Sandman"	Advanced
Smiley & Theo	19	Eduard Stoica	"Ochii tăi"	Advanced
Smiley & Theo	20	Andreas Mioc	"Before You Go"	Eliminated
Smiley & Theo	21	Jessica Lăzărescu	"Ain't Nobody"	Eliminated
Denis	22	Corina Ivanov	"I Just Want To Make Love To You"	Eliminated
Denis	23	Daniel Ciurea	"Back From The Edge"	Eliminated
Denis	24	Anastasia Budeșteanu	"Try"	Advanced
Irina	25	Daria Pintilie	"Into You"	Eliminated
Irina	26	Denisa Avram	"idontwannabeyouanymore"	Eliminated
Irina	27	Theo Rusu	"Walk This Way"	Advanced
Smiley & Theo	28	Andra Pierșinaru	"Loving You"	Eliminated
Smiley & Theo	29	Vlad Nicolici	"Billie Jean"	Advanced
Smiley & Theo	30	Sofia Mărculescu	"Șaraiman"	Eliminated
Denis	31	Marina Nanava	"I Follow Rivers"	Eliminated
Denis	32	Kam Cahayadi	"Talking To The Moon"	Advanced
Denis	33	Alexandra Șipoș	"Chandelier"	Eliminated
Tudor	34	Dana Borteanu	"Wicked Ways"	Eliminated
Tudor	35	Mihailina Moisa	"Heroes"	Eliminated
Tudor	36	Iulian Nunucă	"Never Enough"	Advanced

== Live shows ==
Color key:

Artist was saved by the Public's votes
Artist was eliminated

=== Week 1 - Top 12 (December 9) ===
All twelve remaining contestants performed one song each in the live show on Friday, December 9, 2022. The public vote could save two contestants from each team, the third one was eliminated.

Episode 14 (December 9)
Coach	Order	Artist	Song	Result
Denis	1	Kam Cahayadi	"Black Or White"	Eliminated
Denis	2	Teodor Debu	"Iron Sky"	Public vote
Denis	3	Anastasia Budişteanu	"Ne me quitte pas"	Public vote
Tudor	4	Valeria Marcu	"The Impossible Dream"	Eliminated
Tudor	5	Iulian Nunucă	"Child In Time"	Public vote
Tudor	6	Ioana Vecerdea	"Zombie"	Public vote
Smiley & Theo	7	Winaël Baldus	"You're The Voice"	Public vote
Smiley & Theo	8	Eduard Stoica	"All I Want"	Public vote
Smiley & Theo	9	Vlad Nicolici	"Fallin'"	Eliminated
Irina	10	Andra Botez	"Cine iubește și lasă"	Public vote
Irina	11	Rianna Rusu	"Rise Up"	Public vote
Irina	12	Theo Rusu	"Black Dog"	Eliminated

Non-competition performances
Order	Performer	Song
1	Top 12	"I Gotta Feeling"

=== Week 2 - Semifinal (December 16) ===
All eight remaining contestants performed two songs each in the semi-final on Friday, December 16, 2022: one solo song and a trio with the coach and the other teammate. The public vote could save one contestant from each team, the second one was eliminated.

Episode 15 (December 16)
Coach	Order	Artist	Solo Song	Order	Trio Song	Result
Tudor	3	Iulian Nunucă	"Bohemian Rhapsody"	12	"18 Ani"	Public vote
Tudor	7	Ioana Vercedea	"Something"	12	"18 Ani"	Eliminated
Irina	8	Andra Botez	"I Will Always Love You"	5	"Good Feeling" & "Let's Get It Started"	Public vote
Irina	11	Rianna Rusu	"One"	5	"Good Feeling" & "Let's Get It Started"	Eliminated
Smiley & Theo	4	Winaël Baldus	"De-ai fi tu salcie la mal"	1	"I Wish" & "Constantine"	Public vote
Smiley & Theo	10	Eduard Stoica	"Leave A Light On"	1	"I Wish" & "Constantine"	Eliminated
Denis	2	Anastasia Budeșteanu	"Give It Away"	9	"Înainte să ne fi născut"	Eliminated
Denis	6	Teodor Debu	"Ploaia"	9	"Înainte să ne fi născut"	Public vote

=== Week 3 - Final (December 23) ===
The top 4 contestants performed in the grand final on Friday, December 23, 2022. This week, the four finalists performed a solo song, a duet with a special guest and a duet with their coach. The public vote determined the winner, and that resulted in a victory for Iulian Nunucă, Tudor's fifth victory as a coach.

Episode 18 (December 14)
Coach	Artist	Order	Duet Song (with special guest)	Order	Duet Song (with coach)	Order	Solo Song	Result
Irina Rimes	Andra Botez	1	"Ielele" — with Damian Drăghici & Surorile Osoianu	10	"Have Yourself A Merry Little Christmas"	7	"Time to Say Goodbye"	Runner-up
Denis	Teodor Debu	5	"Sub pielea mea" — with Carla's Dreams	8	"Valuri Mari"	2	"Say Something"	Third place
Smiley & Theo	Winaël Baldus	11	"How Am I Supposed To Live Without You" — with Raluka	3	"Aprinde Scânteia"	6	"SOS"	Fourth place
Tudor Chirilă	Iulian Nunucă	9	"Hallelujah" — with Irina Baianț	12	"Inel, Inel de Aur"	4	"All by Myself"	Winner

== Elimination chart ==
Color key
Artist info

- Artist from Team Tudor
- Artist from Team Irina
- Artist from Team Smiley & Theo
- Artist from Team Denis

Result details

- Winner
- Runner-up
- Third place
- Fourth place
- Artist was saved by the public vote
- Artist was eliminated

=== Overall ===
#	Week 1	Week 2	Final
Iulian Nunucă	Safe	Safe	Winner
Andra Botez	Safe	Safe	Runner-up
Teodor Debu	Safe	Safe	3rd place
Winaël Baldus	Safe	Safe	4th place
Ioana Vecerdea	Safe	Eliminated	Eliminated (Week 2)
Rianna Rusu	Safe	Eliminated	Eliminated (Week 2)
Anastasia Budeșteanu	Safe	Eliminated	Eliminated (Week 2)
Eduard Stoica	Safe	Eliminated	Eliminated (Week 2)
Valeria Marcu	Eliminated	Eliminated (Week 1)	
Theo Rusu	Eliminated	Eliminated (Week 1)	
Kam Cahayadi	Eliminated	Eliminated (Week 1)	
Vlad Nicolici	Eliminated	Eliminated (Week 1)	
Reference(s)			

== Ratings ==
Episode		Original airdate	Timeslot (EET)	National				21–54			Source
Episode		Original airdate	Timeslot (EET)	Rank	Viewers (in thousands)	Rating (%)	Share (%)	Rank	Rating (%)	Share (%)	Source
1	"The Blind Auditions Premiere"	September 9, 2022	Friday, 20:30	1	1.446	8.2	22	1	7.8	27	
2	"The Blind Auditions, Part 2"	September 16, 2022	Friday, 20:30	1	—	—	—	1	—	—	
3	"The Blind Auditions, Part 3"	September 23, 2022	Friday, 20:30	1	1.467	8.3	20.9	1	7.9	25.9	
4	"The Blind Auditions, Part 4"	September 30, 2022	Friday, 20:30	1	1.358	7.7	20	1	8.2	26.4	
5	"The Blind Auditions, Part 5"	October 7, 2022	Friday, 20:30	1	1.465	8.3	21.1	1	8.3	28.6	
6	"The Blind Auditions, Part 6"	October 14, 2022	Friday, 20:30	1	1.397	7.9	20.9	1	6.9	24.8	
7	"The Blind Auditions, Part 7"	October 21, 2022	Friday, 20:30	1	1.291	7.3	18.5	1	7.2	24.2	
8	"The Blind Auditions, Part 8"	October 28, 2022	Friday, 20:30	1	1.242	7	17.8	1	6.2	21.8	
9	"The Blind Auditions, Part 9"	November 4, 2022	Friday, 20:30	1	1.326	7.5	19.6	1	7.8	26.1	
10	"The Battles Premiere"	November 11, 2022	Friday, 20:30	1	—	—	—	1	—	—	
11	"The Battles, Part 2"	November 18, 2022	Friday, 20:30	1	—	—	—	1	—	—	
12	"The Battles, Part 3"	November 25, 2022	Friday, 20:30	1	1.118	6.3	18	1	5.8	20.5	
13	"The Knockout"	December 2, 2022	Friday, 20:30	1	—	—	—	1	—	—	
14	"Live show 1"	December 9, 2022	Friday, 20:30	3	891	5	13.7	2	8.1	27,6	
15	"Semifinal"	December 16, 2022	Friday, 20:30	1	1.103	6.2	18.1	1	5.9	21.8	
16	"Final"	December 23, 2022	Friday, 20:30	1	1.370	7.7	22	1	7.4	27.4	
