= Vanotek =

Record producer and DJ

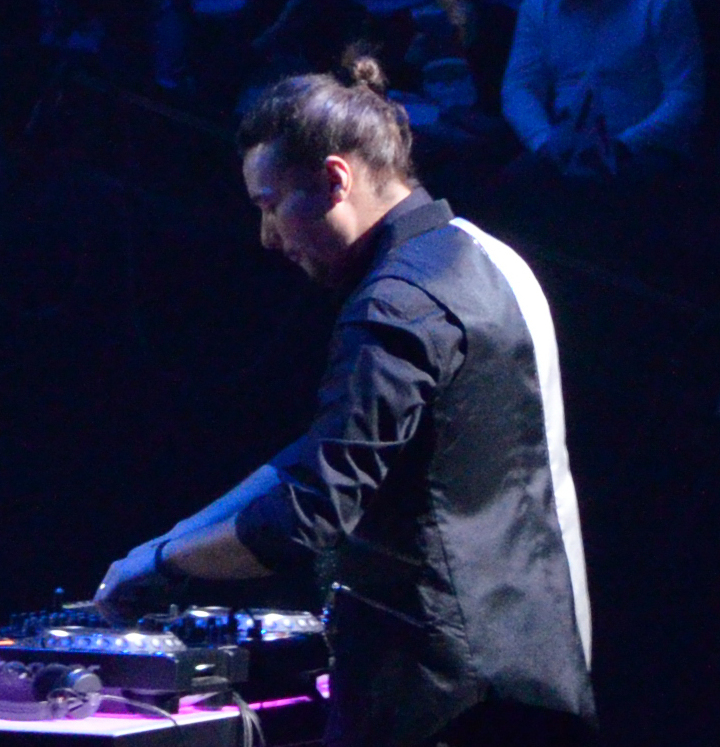

Background information
- Born: Ion Chirinciuc; September 15, 1984 (age 41); Ungheni, Moldova
- Genres: Deep house; EDM; electropop; synth-pop; indietronica
- Occupations: DJ; record producer
- Years active: 2015–present
- Labels: Global; Effective; Ultra

Ion Chirinciuc (born September 15, 1984), better known by stage name Vanotek, is a Moldovan-Romanian record producer and disc jockey. He started producing music for native artists before releasing his debut single "My Heart is Gone" in 2015. The song became successful in Romania, and also brought him a nomination for Best Romanian Act at the 2016 MTV Europe Music Awards. In November 2017, Global Records distributed his debut studio album No Sleep. Two of its singles, "Tell Me Who" and "Back to Me", reached the charts in Romania and Ukraine, among other countries.

== Career ==
Ion Chirinciuc was born September 15, 1984 in Ungheni, Moldova. He moved to Romania to study at the Octav Băncilă Art School in Iași, and later relocated to Bucharest to pursue a career in music. 17 years old at that time, Vanotek went on to produce material for notable artists such as Dan Balan, Antonia and Tom Boxer. In 2015 he released his debut single, "My Heart is Gone", featuring vocals from Yanka. The song went on to be commercially successful in Romania, and brought him a nomination for Best Romanian Act at the 2016 MTV Europe Music Awards. In the same year, Vanotek attempted to represent Romania at the Eurovision Song Contest 2016 in Stockholm, Sweden with "I'm Coming Home", featuring the Code and Georgian. He ultimately finished in second place in Romania's selection show Selecția Națională. In November 2017, Vanotek released his debut album, No Sleep, distributed by Global Records. Alongside the latter label, he is also signed by Ultra Music. The album spawned a string of singles, including "Tell Me Who" and "Back to Me" with Eneli, which attained success in countries such as Romania and Russia.

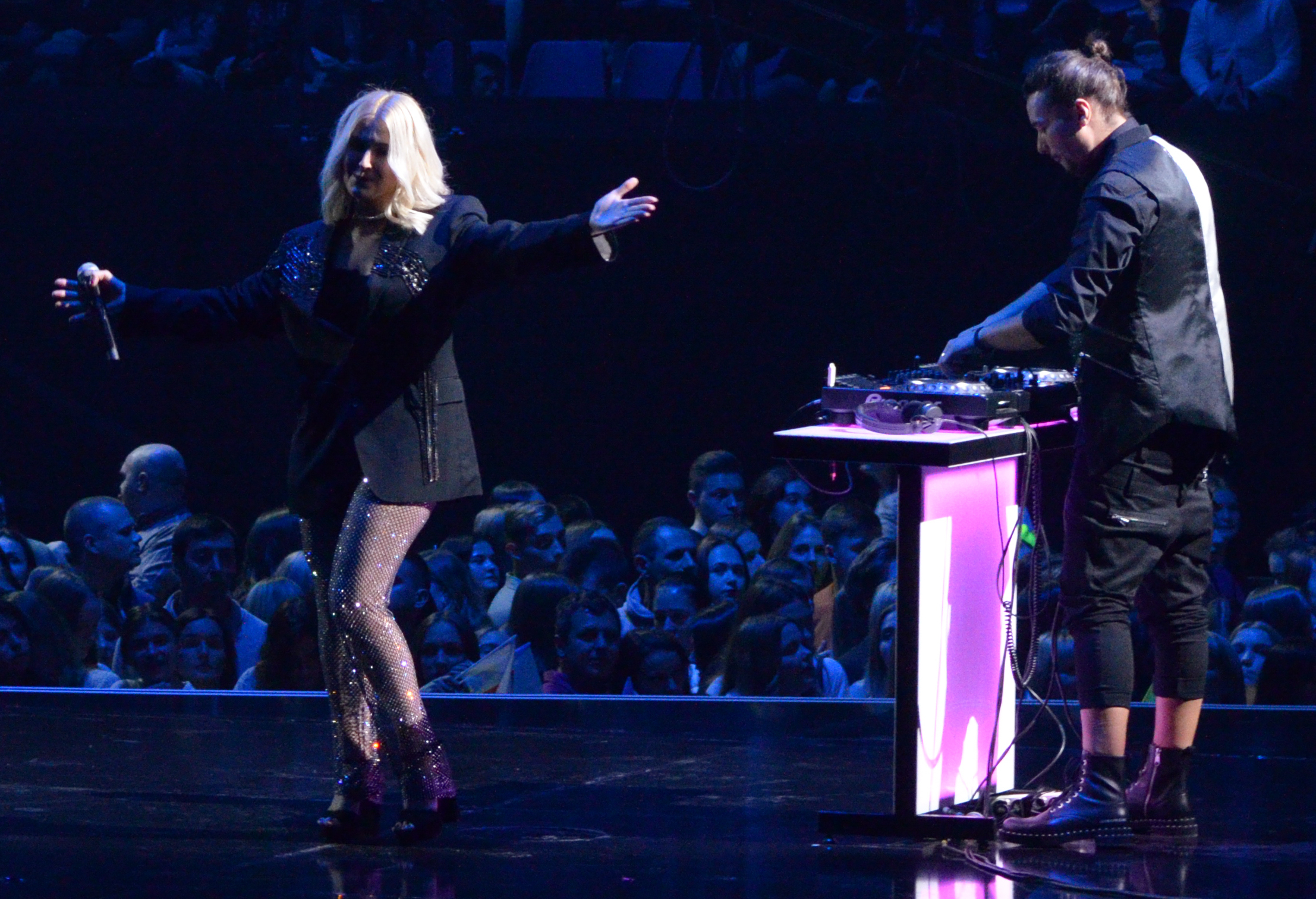
Myata (left) and Vanotek (right) performing at M1 Music Awards 2019

In October 2019 Vanotek released single "Take Me" in collaboration with Ukrainian singer Myata.

== Personal life ==
Vanotek is the father of two children.

== Discography ==
=== Studio albums ===
Title	Album details
No Sleep	Released: 22 November 2017; Label: Global; Format: Digital download

=== Singles ===
Title	Year	Peak chart positions		Album
Title	Year	POL	RUS	Album
"My Heart is Gone" (featuring Yanka)	2015	—	—	No Sleep
"I'm Coming Home" (featuring the Code and Georgian)	2015	—	—	No Sleep
"Viajero" (featuring Hevito)	2016	—	—	No Sleep
"My Mind" (featuring Minelli)	2016	—	—	No Sleep
"În dormitor" (featuring Minelli)	2016	—	—	No Sleep
"Take the Highway"	2017	—	—	No Sleep
"Tell Me Who" (featuring Eneli)	2017	11	2	No Sleep
"No Sleep" (featuring Minelli)	2017	—	168	No Sleep
"Back to Me" (featuring Eneli)	2017	15	5	No Sleep
"Tara" (featuring Eneli)	2017	—	—	No Sleep
"Vision"	2017	—	—	No Sleep
"Runa"	2017	—	—	No Sleep
"My Day" (with Slider & Magnit featuring Mikayla)	2018	—	217	Meet Again (Slider & Magnit album)
"Love is Gone"	2018	—	12	Non-album singles
"Cherry Lips" (featuring Mikayla)	2019	—	—	Non-album singles
"Dirty Diamonds" (featuring Tobi Ibitoye)	2019	—	—	Non-album singles
"Muzica E Pentru Toti" (with Irina Rimes)	2019	—	—	Non-album singles
"Bring Us Back" (feat. Joshua Ziggy)	2020	—	—	Non-album singles
"Talk to Me" (feat. Bastien)	2020	—	—	Non-album singles
"Someone" (feat. Denitia)	2021	—	—	Non-album singles
"Weekend" (with Veve Milah)	2022	—	—	Non-album singles
"—" denotes a title that did not chart, or was not released in that territory.

== Awards and nominations ==
Year	Award	Category	Recipient	Result	Ref.
2016	MTV Europe Music Awards	Best Romanian Act	Vanotek	Nominated	
