= Izvoare, Florești =

Izvoare
- Commune
- Location within Moldova
- Coordinates: 47.9763888889°N 28.1336111111°E
- Country: Moldova
- District: Florești District

Population (2014)
  - Total: 1,593
- Time zone: UTC+2 (EET)
  - Summer (DST): UTC+3 (EEST)

Izvoare is a commune in Florești District, Moldova. It is composed of three villages: Bezeni, Izvoare and Scăieni.

== Notable people ==
Irina Rimes (born 1991)
