= Macanache =

- Also known as: Macca da Chief Rocka, Macalan, Maca, Gimnastu', Bogdan Romanski, Talent Delon
- Born: Constantin-Bogdan Dinescu; 25 May 1988 (age 38); Titan, Bucharest, Romania
- Origin: Bucharest, Romania
- Genres: Hip hop, funk, boom bap, jazz
- Occupations: Musician, rapper, mc, record producer,
- Instrument: Vocal
- Years active: 2014–present
- Label: Interzis Records
- Website: interzis.ro

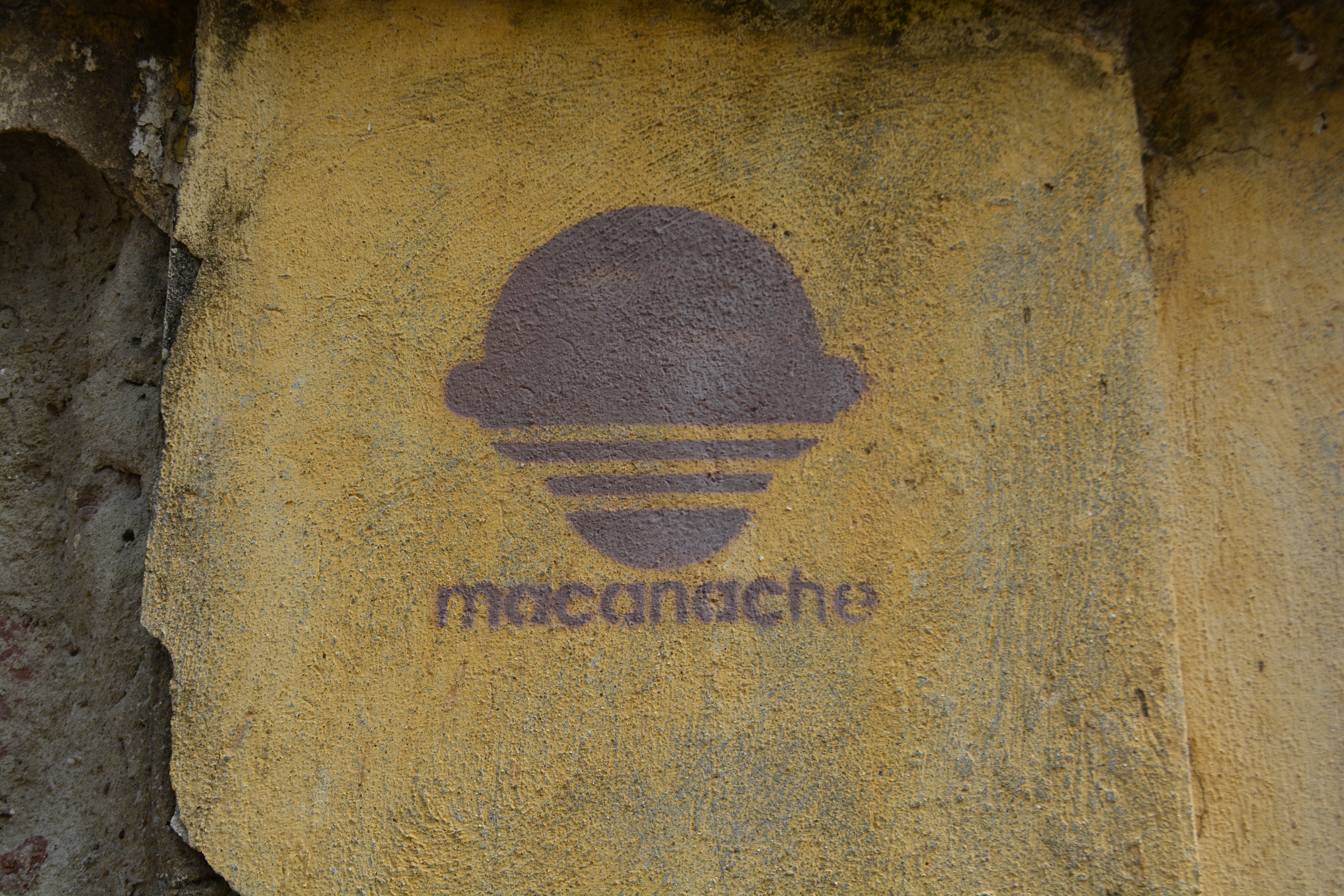
Stencil graffiti for Macanache in Bucharest's Armenian Quarter

Constantin-Bogdan Dinescu (born in Bucharest, Romania), known by his stage name Macanache (pronounced [makaˈnake]), is a Romanian hip-hop MC.

== Biography ==
Macanache was born in Bucharest and spent his childhood in the neighborhood of Titan until he was 14 years old. Forced by financial shortcomings, his family had to sell their house and move to a small apartment in Berceni neighborhood. He supported his family by working in a fish market. He rose to popularity, as an independent artist, in 2015 when he launched the video for the song "Asta sunt eu". His style is relaxed and very sincere with vulgar and thug-like language on an educational comic tone. A genuine character of his time and one of the simplest and most passionate performers of Rap music in Hip Hop culture. In 2017, Macanache was featured on Delia's "Rămâi cu bine", which charted highly in Romania. Later in 2017, Macanache, accepted Phunk B's invitation and joined the band "Patru Grasi" along Dilimanjaro and NCTK. Partru Grasi.

== Singles ==
- Ăsta sunt eu (This Is Me)
- În fiecare zi (Every Day)
- Putred (Rotten)
- Șefu' (Da Boss)
- Prietenii (The Friends)
- O joacă de copii (Cakewalk)
- Original
- Îți arăt că pot (I'll Show You I Can!)
- Ghinion (Bad Luck)
- E ce trebe? (Is It What It's Gotta Be?)
- Sufletwo (Soul-two)
- O cheamă (Her Name Is)
- Interzis (Forbidden)
- Banu' e dușmanu (The Money Is The Enemy)
- Sofia
- Eu dau Graffiti (I Do Graffiti)
- Mesajul (The Message)
- E sănătos (It's Healthy)
- Bucarest Stail (Bucharest Style)
- O Mamă (A Mother)
- Diana
- Trei Chestii (Three Things)

== Discography ==
- Interzis (2015)
- Comedia (2016)
- Macadopere (2017)
- Moft (2018)
- Legea (2019)
- La Misto (2020)
- Bodega (2020)
- Geamanu (2020)
- 2 Hard 2 Bite (2021)

== Comedia 2016 ==
COMEDIA

Studio album by Macanache
- Released: October 14, 2016
- Recorded: 2015–2016
- Genres: West Coast hip hop; East Coast hip hop; Storytelling rap; Comedy rap; Romanian hip hop
- Length: 58:21
- Label: Interzis Records
- Producers: Ceinaru; MC Bean; FLG; Fantome; Sanchez; Avram; Nerub; Fanas; SEZ; The Watcher; Macanache; RIPP

Macanache chronology
INTERZIS (2016)	''COMEDIA'' (2016)	MACADOPERE (2017)

Comedia is the second album released by Romanian independent hip hop artist Macanache. The album was released in the same day and at the same event as the album Interzis. This album includes singles such as "Prietenii", "Sofia" and "Bucarest Stail". It also features three remixes to the next traks:

- O Joaca de Copii by Sanchez (with the original a cappella)
- Bucarest Stail by Avram (with the original a cappella)
- Prietenii by RIPP

=== Track listing ===
#	Title	Songwriters	Producer(s)	Featured Performer (s)	Length
1	"Introducere"	Macanache	SEZ, The Watcher, Macanache		01:42
2	"Bucarest stail"	Macanache	Ceinaru, The Watcher, Macanache	D.J. Sfera	04:17
3	"E ce trebe"	Macanache	SEZ, The Watcher, Macanache	The Watcher	03:21
4	"Ghinion"	Macanache	SEZ, The Watcher, Macanache		04:06
5	"O joaca de copii"	Macanache	MC Bean, The Watcher, Macanache		04:10
6	"E sanatos"	Macanache	Fanas, The Watcher, Macanache		04:00
7	"O cheama"	Macanache	SEZ, The Watcher, Macanache		03:51
8	"Prietenii"	Macanache	Fantome, The Watcher, Macanache	Fantome	04:25
9	"Sofia"	Macanache	Nerub, The Watcher, Macanache		04:40
10	"Degeaba"	Macanache	Fanas, The Watcher, Macanache		03:07
11	"Tenis"	Macanache	RIPP, The Watcher, Macanache		03:31
12	"Incheiere"	Macanache	FLG, The Watcher, Macanache		04:57
13	"O joaca de copii - Remix"	Macanache	Sanchez		04:13
14	"Bucarest stail - Remix"	Macanache	Avram		04:03
15	"Prietenii - Remix"	Macanache	RIPP		03:59
