= Killa Fonic =

Romanian singer and songwriter (born 1989)

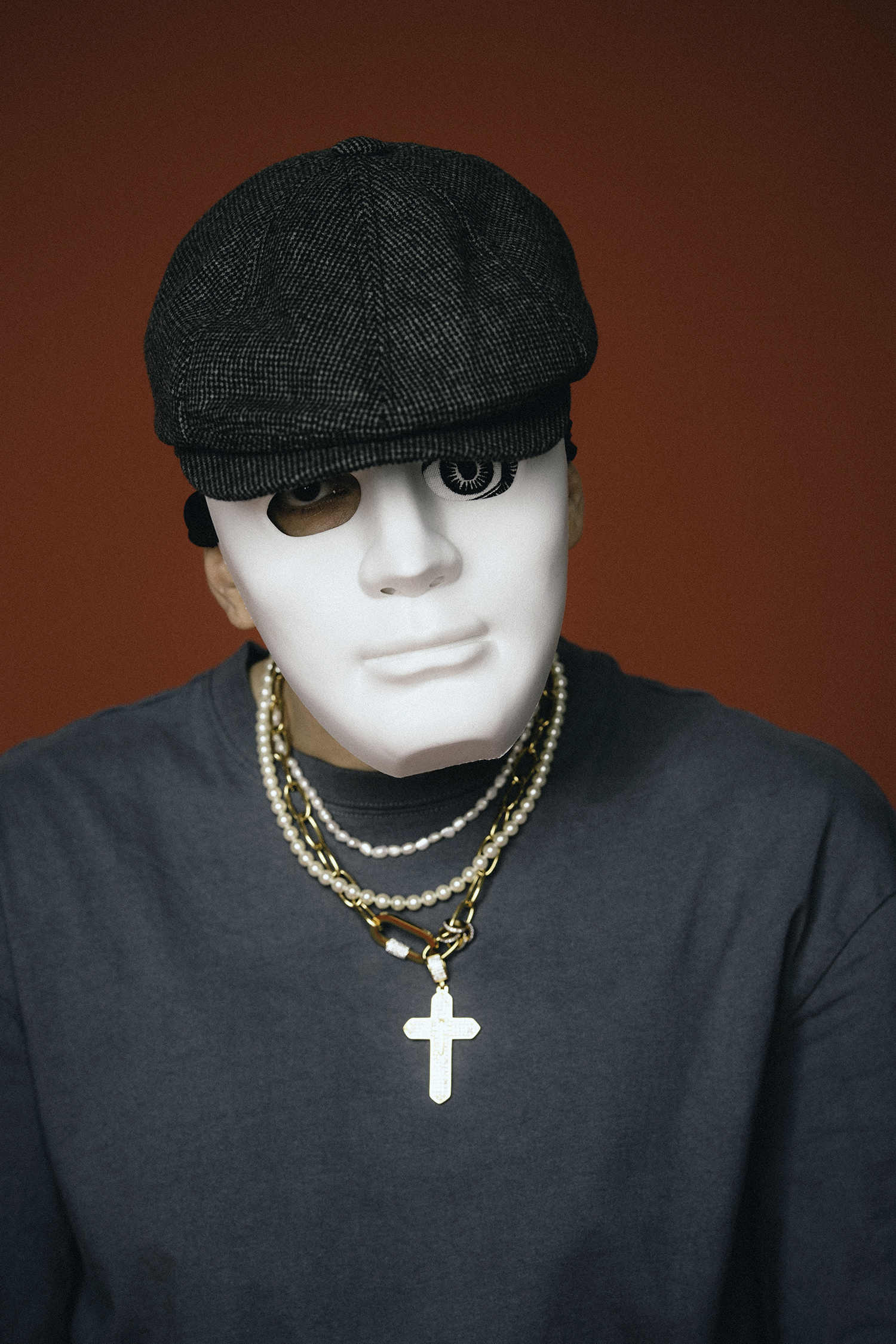
- Born: Ionuț Răducanu; 14 February 1989 (age 37); Ploiești, Romania
- Occupations: Rapper; singer; songwriter
- Years active: 2013–present
- Musical career
- Genres: Hip-hop; trap; pop; rap rock
- Labels: Seek Music; KHK; Global Records

Ionuț Răducanu (born 14 February 1989), better known by his stage name Killa Fonic, is a Romanian rapper, singer and songwriter. He is credited with introducing trap music in Romania, both as a member of the group Șatra B.E.N.Z. and as a solo artist; after his departure from the band, he has experimented with multiple sounds.

== Life and career ==
Killa Fonic was born on 14 February 1989, in the city of Ploiești. The artist grew up in a local community in the yard of a military unit. His passion for hip hop music was instilled in him by his father, who brought him tapes and made him listen only to quality music.

In 2013, Killa Fonic released his first tracks, "Sit back and smoke", "Sesiune pe vinil", "Drink & Blunt", and "24", which he posted on his YouTube channel. Also, in the same year, his first mixtape, Lord de cartier, appeared.

In 2015 he became one of the founding members of the band Șatra B.E.N.Z., with whom he released two albums: O.$.O.D. (O șatră, o dragoste) and O.$.O.D. II.

His first solo album is called Ramses 1989, was released in 2016 and was promoted by several songs, including a collaboration with Irina Rimes for the single "Baby Blues".

Just one year after his solo debut, Killa Fonic released his second album, Lamă Crimă, in July 2017. This album contains 23 tracks and collaborations with Irina Rimes, Connect-R, Shift, Nane, Pacha Man, Nosfe, Super ED, O.G. EastBull, Domnul Udo and Jakoban.

In December 2018, the singer released his first EP, Emotiv Munteana, which contains seven stories about seven earthly women. In the spring of 2019, the artist chose to leave the band Șatra B.E.N.Z., created his label called KHK (Killa House Klan) and signed with Global Records.

On 12 September 2019, Killa Fonic released the single "Bambolina", a collaboration with Carla's Dreams. The song is composed by Killa Fonic and Carla's Dreams, and the producers are Alex Cotoi and Mihai Alexandru Bogdan. "Bambolina" climbed to 1st place in the Top Airplay 100 41 days after its launch and remained in the Top 10 for another 13 weeks.

In early 2020, Killa Fonic composed and performed the song from the soundtrack of the movie "Miami Bici". The single peaked in 3rd place in the Top Airplay 100 and remained in the Top 10 for another three weeks.

On 1 June 2020, the artist released III, the first album of that year. At the end of 2020, the BeetleJuice album, inspired by Tim Burton's movie, was released. This album contains 11 tracks and collaborations with Spike and 911.

On 12 February 2021, Killa Fonic and Smiley released the single "Lasă inima să zbiere", the first collaboration between the two artists. At the end of spring, the album 2089 was released, a fusion LP between techno and pop music. Terra Vista, Killa Fonic's second album in 2021, was released on 17 December.

== Discography ==
Killa Fonic discography
- Studio albums: 6
- EPs: 2
- Soundtrack albums: 1
- Compilation albums: 2
- Singles: 182

=== Albums ===
==== Studio albums ====
Title	Album details
Lamă Crimă	Released: 27 July 2017; Label: Seek Music; Format: CD
Trendsetter	Released: 28 February 2019; Label: Seek Music; Format: CD
III	Released: 1 June 2020; Label: Global / KHK; Format: CD
Beetlejuice	Released: 14 December 2020; Label: Global / KHK; Format: CD
2089	Released: 7 June 2021; Label: Global / KHK; Format: CD, Digital download, Streaming
Terra Vista	Released: 17 December 2021; Label: Global / KHK; Format: CD, Digital download, Streaming
Osvaldo	Released: 9 December 2022; Label: Global / KHK; Format: CD, Digital download, Streaming
MAT-STHĀNI SARVA-BHŪTĀNI	Released: 22 December 2023; Label: Global / KHK; Format: CD, Digital download, Streaming
RADIOFONIC	Released: 20 November 2024; Label: Global/KHK; Format: CD, Digital Download, Streaming

==== Extended plays ====
Title	Album details			
Emotiv Munteana	Released: 18 December 2018; Label: Seek Music; Format: CD, EP			
Taxi Driver	Released: 21 April 2020; Label: Global / KHK; Format: Digital download, EP			
SS1000	Released: 21 June 2023; Label: Global / KHK; Format: Digital download, EP			
Rock This Way	Released: 17 November 2023; Label: Global / KHK; Format: Digital download, EP			
Opus Magnum (with Gridan)	Released: 12 July 2024; Label: Global / KHK; Formats: Digital download, EP	186	—	11

==== Mixtapes ====
Title	Album details
Lord de Cartier	Released: 2013; Label: N/A; Format: CD
Ramses 1989	Released: 18 May 2016; Label: Seek Music; Format: CD

=== Singles ===
==== As lead artist ====
List of singles as lead artist
Title	Year	Peak chart positions	Album
Title	Year	ROU	Album
"Sit back and smoke"	2013	—	Non-album singles
"Sesiune pe vinil" (with Tony Dph)	2013	—	Non-album singles
"Drink & Blunt"	2013	—	Lord de cartier
"24"	2013	—	Lord de cartier
"De cartier"	2013	—	Lord de cartier
"Lord"	2013	—	Lord de cartier
"Red Eyes"	2013	—	Lord de cartier
"Trillin"	2013	—	Lord de cartier
"Sparg" (featuring Nosfe and Super ED)	2014	—	Part Time Rapper Vol. 3
"Cămila orașului 2"	2015	—	Non-album singles
"Killa House Klan"	2015	—	Non-album singles
"Caracatița" (with Lu-K Beats, Nosfe and Dj Grigo)	2015	—	Non-album singles
"B.E.N.Z."	2016	—	Non-album singles
"17 (Preludiu "Ramses 1989")"	2016	—	Non-album singles
"Pistolu’, Maceta" (featuring Super ED)	2016	—	Ramses 1989
"Din mahala la palat" (featuring Doc)	2016	—	Ramses 1989
"$omnambul"	2016	—	Ramses 1989
"De cartier"	2016	—	Ramses 1989
"Ceara" (featuring Keed)	2016	—	Ramses 1989
"Balada Trap" (featuring Shift)	2016	—	Ramses 1989
"Toți sub același cer"	2016	—	Ramses 1989
"Baby Blues" (featuring Irina Rimes)	2016	—	Ramses 1989
"Re-evoluție" (featuring Nosfe)	2016	—	Ramses 1989
"Je$us" (featuring Irina Rimes and Super Ed)	2016	—	Ramses 1989
"$telar Diablo" (featuring Super Ed)	2016	—	Ramses 1989
"Muguri" (featuring Nane)	2016	—	Ramses 1989
"#celmairăudrog"	2016	—	Ramses 1989
"N-ai loc" (featuring Raluka)	2016	—	Ramses 1989
"Nevroza" (featuring Super Ed)	2016	—	Ramses 1989
"Mvrdar" (featuring Domnul Udo and Keed)	2016	—	Ramses 1989
"Îți scriu înapoi" (featuring Super Ed)	2016	—	Lamă Crimă
"Ard"	2016	—	Lamă Crimă
"Skinny Pesci"	2016	—	Non-album singles
"Sus" (featuring Lentile Blur)	2016	—	Non-album singles
"Scrum" (featuring Connect-R)	2016	—	Lamă Crimă
"Has Mo Pele"	2016	—	Non-album singles
"Dalai Lamă"	2017	—	Non-album singles
"Harneală" (featuring Nosfe)	2017	—	Non-album singles
"Preludiu "Lamă Crimă"	2017	—	Non-album singles
"Exodus / Doar tu"	2017	—	Non-album singles
"OZN-uri" (featuring Super ED)	2017	—	Non-album singles
"Fler" (featuring Shift and Keed)	2017	—	Non-album singles
"Intro"	2017	—	Lamă Crimă
"Alb ca varu'"	2017	—	Lamă Crimă
"#zilebănplm" (featuring Nane)	2017	—	Lamă Crimă
"Craniu" (featuring Pacha Man)	2017	—	Lamă Crimă
"4 Dimineața" (featuring Nosfe)	2017	—	Lamă Crimă
"AKA" (featuring Nane, OG Eastbull and Super Ed)	2017	—	Lamă Crimă
"Alina"	2017	—	Lamă Crimă
"Floare ofilită"	2017	—	Lamă Crimă
"Pietrificat" (featuring Shift)	2017	—	Lamă Crimă
"$Uave"	2017	—	Lamă Crimă
"Fructul lor"	2017	—	Lamă Crimă
"Doar tu"	2017	—	Lamă Crimă
"Piesa noastră" (featuring Irina Rimes)	2017	—	Lamă Crimă
"X ca să dorm bine" (featuring Domnul Udo)	2017	—	Lamă Crimă
"Copilu' din mine"	2017	—	Lamă Crimă
"Încă o zi" (featuring Super Ed)	2017	—	Lamă Crimă
"Lanțuri" (featuring Super Ed)	2017	—	Lamă Crimă
"8mm" (featuring Jakoban)	2017	—	Lamă Crimă
"Îndoaie-te"	2017	—	Lamă Crimă
"Rim$e$"	2017	—	Lamă Crimă
"Când câinii de pază dorm" (with Nosfe)	2017	—	Non-album singles
"9 ciori"	2017	—	Non-album singles
"Cum vrea ea"	2018	—	Non-album singles
"Hakana" (featuring Nosfe, Domnul Udo and Amuly)	2018	—	Non-album singles
"Lista de păcate" (with Liviu Teodorescu)	2018	—	Non-album singles
"DVNS"	2018	—	Non-album singles
"Scrum 2"	2018	—	Non-album singles
"Gangster"	2018	—	Trendsetter
"2miliNblunt"	2018	—	Non-album singles
"Alpha"	2018	—	Non-album singles
"Tango"	2018	—	Emotiv Munteana
"Legenda celor 4 colțuri ale blocului" (with Chimie)	2018	—	Legenda celor 4 colțuri ale blocului
"Super Nova"	2018	—	Lamă Crimă
"Ecou"	2018	—	Lamă Crimă
"Misterios"	2018	—	Lamă Crimă
"O coc"	2018	—	Lamă Crimă
"Nici în vis"	2018	—	Lamă Crimă
"Muzeu"	2018	—	Lamă Crimă
"Doreta"	2019	—	Trendsetter
"Dărâmăm" (featuring Nosfe)	2019	—	Trendsetter
"Beijing" (featuring Nane)	2019	—	Trendsetter
"Cum vreau io" (featuring Pacha Man)	2019	—	Trendsetter
"K P Vremuri" (featuring Skizzo Skillz)	2019	—	Trendsetter
"Bafto Delo" (featuring Dj Abs and NCTK)	2019	—	Trendsetter
"Lider"	2019	—	Trendsetter
"Al Jazeera"	2019	—	Trendsetter
"Los Santos" (featuring Nane)	2019	—	Trendsetter
"Chanel & Dior" (featuring Domnul Udo)	2019	—	Trendsetter
"K.H.K."	2019	—	Non-album singles
"Oameni în negru"	2019	—	Non-album singles
"Chimie organică"	2019	—	Non-album singles
"Sălbatic până mor"	2019	—	Non-album singles
"Toc"	2019	—	Non-album singles
"Mambo"	2019	—	Non-album singles
"Nimeni"	2019	—	III
"Richie Rich"	2019	—	III
"Fețe palide"	2019	—	III
"Distors"	2019	—	III
"Johnny Cage"	2019	—	Non-album singles
"Bambolina" (featuring Carla's Dreams)	2019	1	Non-album singles
"Lucifer"	2019	—	Non-album singles
"Wroom wroom"	2019	—	Non-album singles
"Lucy"	2019	—	Non-album singles
"Haolo" (with Nane)	2019	—	Non-album singles
"Todos"	2019	—	Non-album singles
"Ploaia divină"	2019	—	III
"Miami Bici"	2020	3	Miami Bici (OST)
"Polar Express"	2020	—	Taxi Driver
"Lord de cartier"	2020	—	Taxi Driver
"Cirque du Soleil" (with 911)	2020	—	Taxi Driver
"Go Gettas" (with bbno$, Andrei, Azteca and Nane)	2020	—	Non-album singles
"Intro"	2020	—	III
"$mith & Wesson" (with 911)	2020	—	III
"Stai" (with Nane)	2020	—	III
"Zei"	2020	—	III
"Kpcoca" (with Azteca and Nane)	2020	—	III
"Groupies"	2020	—	III
"95 Porsche"	2020	—	III
"Diablo"	2020	—	III
"Upgrade"	2020	—	III
"Moodsetter"	2020	—	III
"Vis lucid"	2020	—	III
"Zombie Zero Panarame" (with Nane)	2020	—	III
"Antidot" (featuring AMI)	2020	—	Non-album singles
"Sânge în palme"	2020	—	2089
"MTK" (with 911)	2020	—	Non-album singles
"Fața blue" (with Otherside)	2020	—	Non-album singles
"Tango & Cash" (with Rico888)	2020	—	Non-album singles
"Felinare" (with 911)	2020	—	Non-album singles
"Mucle$" (with 911)	2020	—	Beetlejuice
"Extaz murdar" (with Emaa)	2020	—	Non-album singles
"Beetlejuice"	2020	—	Beetlejuice
"Josdpplm"	2020	—	Beetlejuice
"Friday Loungin' Noir Edition" (with Dj ABS)	2020	—	Beetlejuice
"Forever Young"	2020	—	Beetlejuice
"Umăr la umăr" (with 911)	2020	—	Beetlejuice
"K un dealer pe noapte"	2020	—	Beetlejuice
"Tropice" (with Spike)	2020	—	Beetlejuice
"Acid"	2020	—	Beetlejuice
"Prada ei"	2020	—	Beetlejuice
"Vitamina"	2020	—	Beetlejuice
"Lasă inima să zbiere" (with Smiley)	2021	5	Non-album singles
"Socheres Merundo" (with Rava)	2021	—	Non-album singles
"Badum Tss" (with Cezar Guna and Realm)	2021	—	Non-album singles
"Jumătăți" (with Senet and Spike)	2021	—	Non-album singles
"Intro" (with Dem)	2021	—	Sanchi
"Sex Tantra" (with Dem and Azteca)	2021	—	Sanchi
"Doar o bârfă"	2021	—	2089
"Droguri medicinale / 2089 Freestyle" (with 911)	2021	—	Terra Vista
"Maui" (with Wrs)	2021	—	Non-album singles
"Cyberfvcker"	2021	—	2089
"Paris"	2021	—	2089
"Toate ca toate"	2021	—	2089
"Voila" (with Bruja)	2021	—	2089
"Javra / Vraja"	2021	—	2089
"Vid" (with Otherside)	2021	—	2089
"Doar o adresă"	2021	—	2089
"Memorie oarbă" (with Damian Drăghici)	2021	—	2089
"Niciun glonț nu doare cât dragostea"	2021	—	2089
"Vipera"	2021	—	2089
"Pur Sânge" (with Damian & Brothers)	2021	—	Non-album singles
"Questo Summer"	2021	—	Non-album singles
"Poezii seamănă a știri" (with Oscar)	2021	—	Apă
"Moscova"	2021	—	Terra Vista
"Crazy Valorant" (with Roxen)	2021	—	Non-album singles
"Steak"	2021	—	Terra Vista
"Bloody Acapulco"	2021	—	Terra Vista
"New Vista"	2021	—	Terra Vista
"Droguri medicinale"	2021	—	Terra Vista
"Mr. Deville"	2021	—	Terra Vista
"Armada" (with Emaa)	2021	—	Terra Vista
"F14D12"	2021	—	Terra Vista
"Ia-l de cap"	2021	—	Terra Vista
"Trinidad" (with Rava and Xeno)	2021	—	Terra Vista
"My Dog"	2021	—	Terra Vista
"Yagalo" (with Rava)	2021	—	Buliba$ha
"Audi Negru White Jeans"	2022	—	Terra Vista
"Unfollow Hate"	2022	—	Non-album singles
"Portugal" (with The Game, Phade and Andrei)	2022	—	Non-album singles
"Cum am știut" (with Delia)	2022	9	Non-album singles
"Sfert" (with Șapte)	2022	—	Non-album singles
"Niagara"	2022	—	Non-album singles
"Dă din el" (with Diezz)	2022	—	Non-album singles
"—" denotes a title that did not chart, or was not released in that territory.

==== As featured artist ====
List of singles as featured artist
Title	Year	Album
"SVR" (Lu-K Beats featuring Killa Fonic, Nosfe, Super ED and TZIP)	2014	Non-album singles
"Dulce otravă" (Raluka featuring Killa Fonic)	2016	Non-album singles
"Eu și băieții" (Nane featuring Killa Fonic)	2016	Lună Plină
"2000" (Amuly featuring Killa Fonic)	2017	Non-album singles
"Airsoft" (Nosfe featuring Killa Fonic)	2017	Uncle Benz
"Vayacondios" (Nosfe featuring Killa Fonic)	2017	Uncle Benz
"Bandana" (Irina Rimes featuring Killa Fonic)	2017	Despre el
"Valium" (Lu-K Beats featuring Killa Fonic, Lentile Blur and Super Ed)	2018	Non-album singles
"Banii-n sac" (Baboi featuring Killa Fonic and Nosfe)	2018	Non-album singles
"Regina" (Keed featuring Killa Fonic)	2018	Money Dinero Bani Valoare
"Pe drum" (Amuly and PRNY featuring Killa Fonic)	2018	Non-album singles
"Adorm" (Damia featuring Killa Fonic)	2018	Non-album singles
"Ferrari" (Cosy featuring Killa Fonic)	2018	Non-album singles
"Arde" (ADDA featuring Killa Fonic)	2018	Non-album singles
"Cirq" (NCTK featuring Killa Fonic)	2018	Non-album singles
"M" (Domnul Udo featuring Killa Fonic)	2018	Domnul 11
"Basme" (Domnul Udo featuring Killa Fonic)	2018	Domnul 11
"Trap House" (Domnul Udo featuring Killa Fonic)	2018	Domnul 11
"200" (Nosfe featuring Killa Fonic)	2018	Înainte Nosferatu
"Cartieru' arde" (Nane featuring Killa Fonic)	2018	Live @ Untold 2019
"Banii" (Nosfe featuring Killa Fonic)	2019	Înainte Nosferatu
"Praf" (Nosfe featuring Killa Fonic)	2019	Înainte Nosferatu
"Abu Dhabi" (Nosfe featuring Killa Fonic)	2019	Înainte Nosferatu
"Prototip" (Nosfe featuring Killa Fonic)	2019	Înainte Nosferatu
"Peste tot" (Adrian Despot featuring Killa Fonic, Adi de la Vâlcea and Ovidiu Lipan "Țăndărică")	2020	Non-album singles
"Grr-Grr" (Amuly featuring Killa Fonic)	2020	Blindat
"Fendi (Remix)" (R3HAB and Rakhim & Smokepurpp featuring Killa Fonic, Ian and Azteca)	2020	Non-album singles
"0 Cellulite" (Rico888 featuring Killa Fonic and 911)	2020	Cosa Credi
"Vin viu, plec mort" (HVNDS featuring Killa Fonic and Rava)	2022	Animal
"Radio Sexy" (OG Eastbull featuring Killa Fonic)	2022	Non-album singles
"Nimeni nu ne poate opri" (Cabron featuring Killa Fonic)	2022	Non-album singles
"Cand se lasa seara" (ALECSA and Killa Fonic)	2022	

== Filmography ==
Year	Title	Role	Credit	Ref.
2020	Miami Bici	—	Original Soundtrack	
