= The Motans =

Moldovan singer, songwriter, and lyricist (born in 1989)

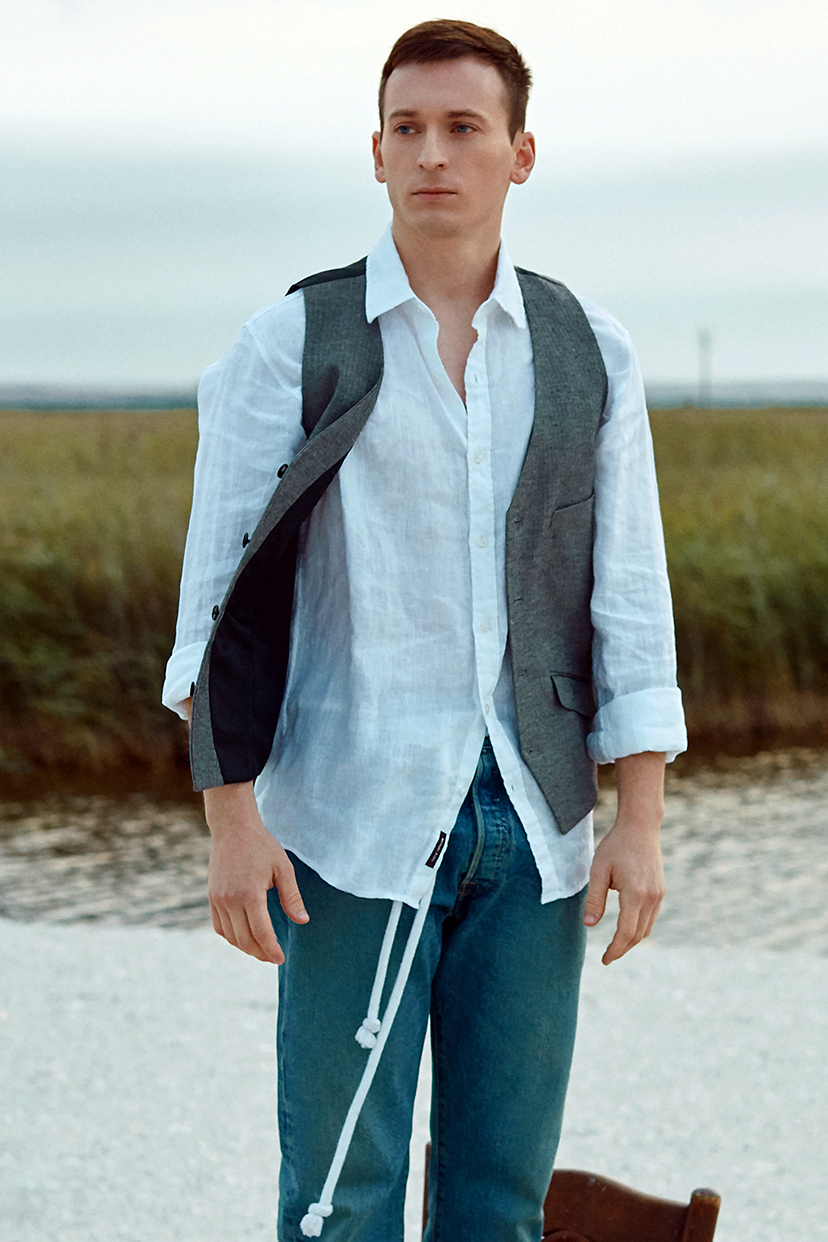
- The Motans in 2018, during the filming of a music video
- Born: Denis Roabeș; 2 August 1989 (age 36); Moldova
- Occupations: singer; songwriter; lyricist
- Years active: 2015–present
- Musical career
- Genres: Alternative pop • R&B • pop • hip hop • rock
- Labels: Global
- Website: themotans.com
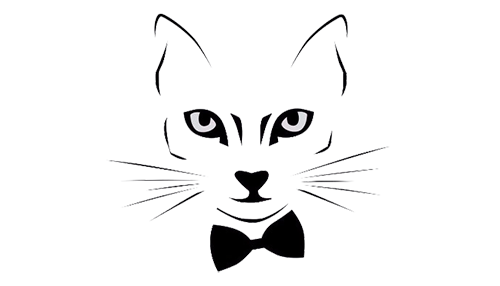

Denis Roabeș, better known as The Motans, is a Moldovan singer, songwriter, and lyricist.

== Life and career ==
=== 1989–2014 ===
Denis Roabeș was born on 2 August 1989, in the Republic of Moldova. After graduating from high school, he moved to Moscow, where he lived and worked as a marketing and sales specialist for three years. In 2014, Roabeș returned to Moldova because he understood that marketing is not what he wanted to do in life.

His stage name has its origins in the artist's dreams. Before starting his music career, Roabeș only dreamed of tomcats and cats every night for seven years. When he began singing, these dreams disappeared, which prompted him to choose the name "The Motans".

=== 2015–2018 ===
After releasing the song "Versus" in August 2016, The Motans came to the attention of Romanian vlogger Matei Dima. He contacted the artist and helped him launch and promote himself in Romania.

The Motans returned with a new single in early 2017. The song "Weekend" was made in collaboration with Delia.

On 1 September 2018, The Motans gave a recital at the Gala of the Golden Stag Festival in Brașov.

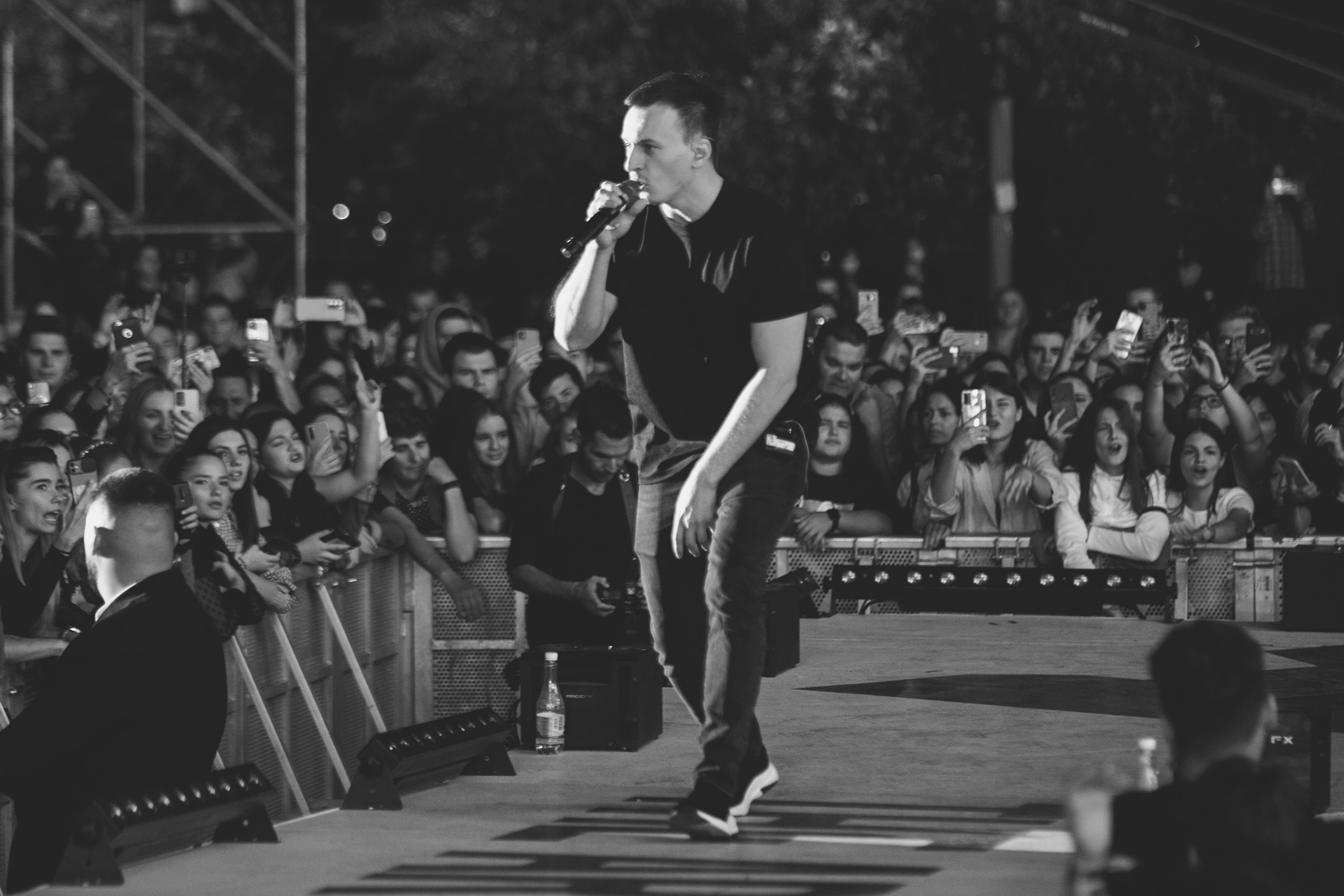
The Motans on stage at The Artist Awards 2021

=== 2019–2021 ===
In 2019, The Motans won three awards at The Artist Awards (an annual music event held in Romania): YouTube Award, Best Song ("Poem" with Irina Rimes), and Best Collaboration (once again, "Poem" with Irina Rimes).

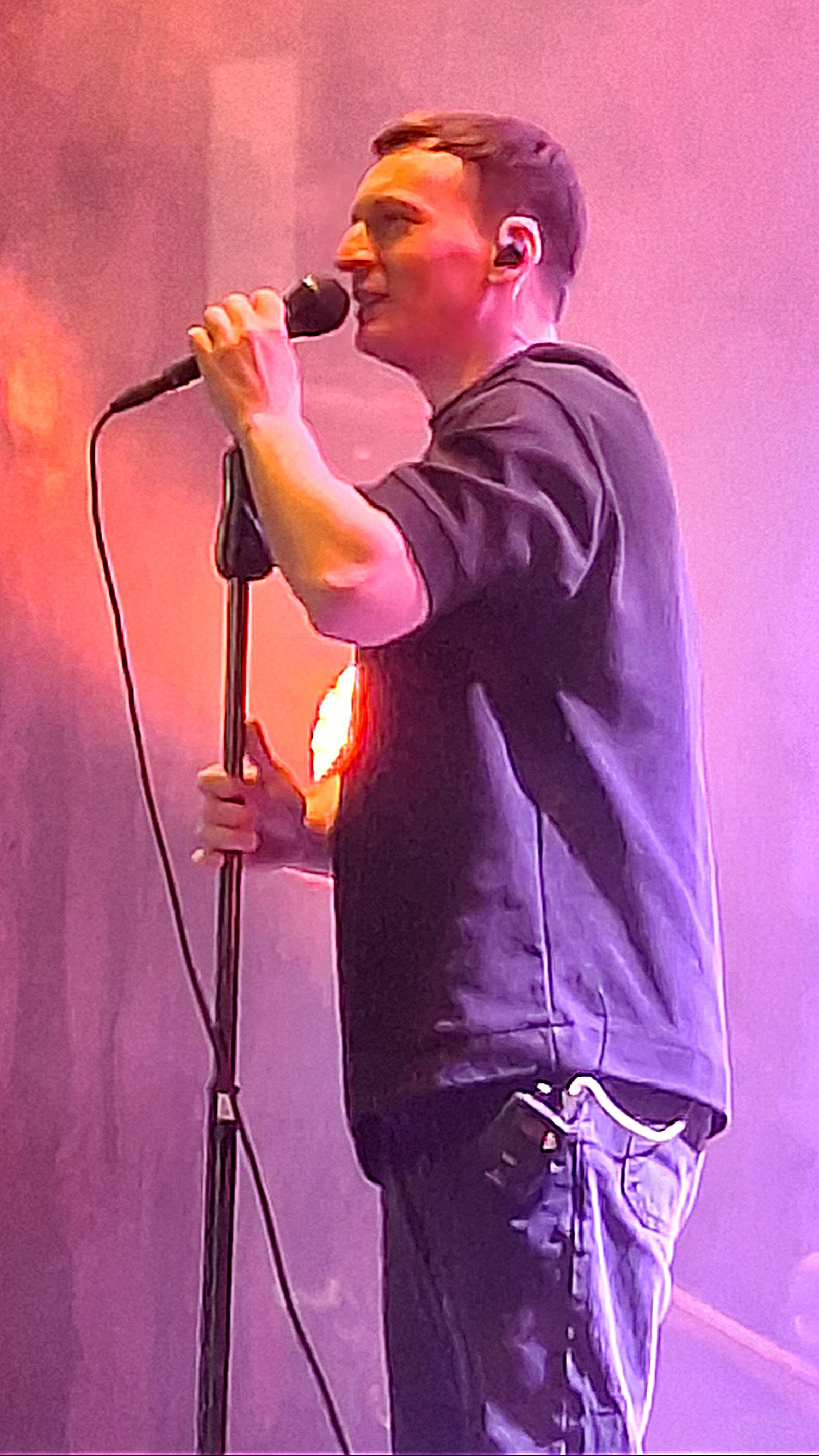
The Motans on stage at West Side Christmas Market (Bucharest, 2023)

The Motans' second album was My Rhythm & Soul. The 12-track album was released on 13 August 2020, by Global and includes the hit song "Poem" (a collaboration with Irina Rimes) and the song "Saint Loneliness" (an atypical track featuring the band Marea Neagră). All songs were composed by The Motans and produced by Alex Cotoi, Viky Red, Marcel Botezan & Sebastian Barac, Vlad Lucan, Vladimir Coman, and Achi Petre.

In October 2020, The Motans and Emaa released the song "Insula".

In 2021, The Motans won the award for Best Live Act at The Artist Awards (organized by Big Events in partnership with the Romanian Opera Craiova).

=== 2022 ===
In June 2022, he was announced as one of the four coaches of season 10 of Vocea României.

=== 2023 ===
In December 2023, The Motans was one of the singers going on stage at West Side Christmas Market, a Christmas market held in Sector 6, Bucharest.

== Discography ==
=== Singles ===
- 2017
  - "Weekend" (with Delia)
  - "Fifty-Fifty"
  - "1000 RPM"
  - "Versus"
  - "August"
  - "Nota de plată" (with Inna)
  - "Friend Zone"
  - "Lilith" (with Keed)
- 2018
  - "Drama Queen"
  - "Jackpot"
  - "Mr. Tort"
  - "Pentru Că" (with Inna)
  - "Subtitre" (alt DJ featuring The Motans)
  - "Cel mai bun DJ" (with Irina Rimes)
  - "Înainte să ne fi născut"
  - "Maraton"
  - "Saint Loneliness" (with Marea Neagră)
- 2019
  - "Poem" (with Irina Rimes)
  - "Valuri Mari"
  - "Bine Indispus"
- 2020
  - "Din trecut" (with Alina Eremia)
  - "Ani lumină"
  - "Cel Din Oglinda"
  - "Astrologic Vorbind"
  - "Insula" (with Emaa)
  - "Sigur"
- 2021
  - "Povestea unui naufragiat"
  - "Vara în care m-ai găsit" (with PAX)
  - "Copiii care au visat greșit"
  - "A mea"
  - "La Nesfârșit"
- 2022
  - "Tare" (with Inna)
  - "Gata de zbor" (with Irina Rimes)

=== Albums ===
Title	Details
My Gorgeous Drama Queens	Released: 28 February 2018; Label: Global; Format: CD, Digital download
My Rhythm & Soul	Released: 13 August 2020; Label: Global; Format: CD, Digital download
