= Irina Rimes =

Moldovan singer-songwriter

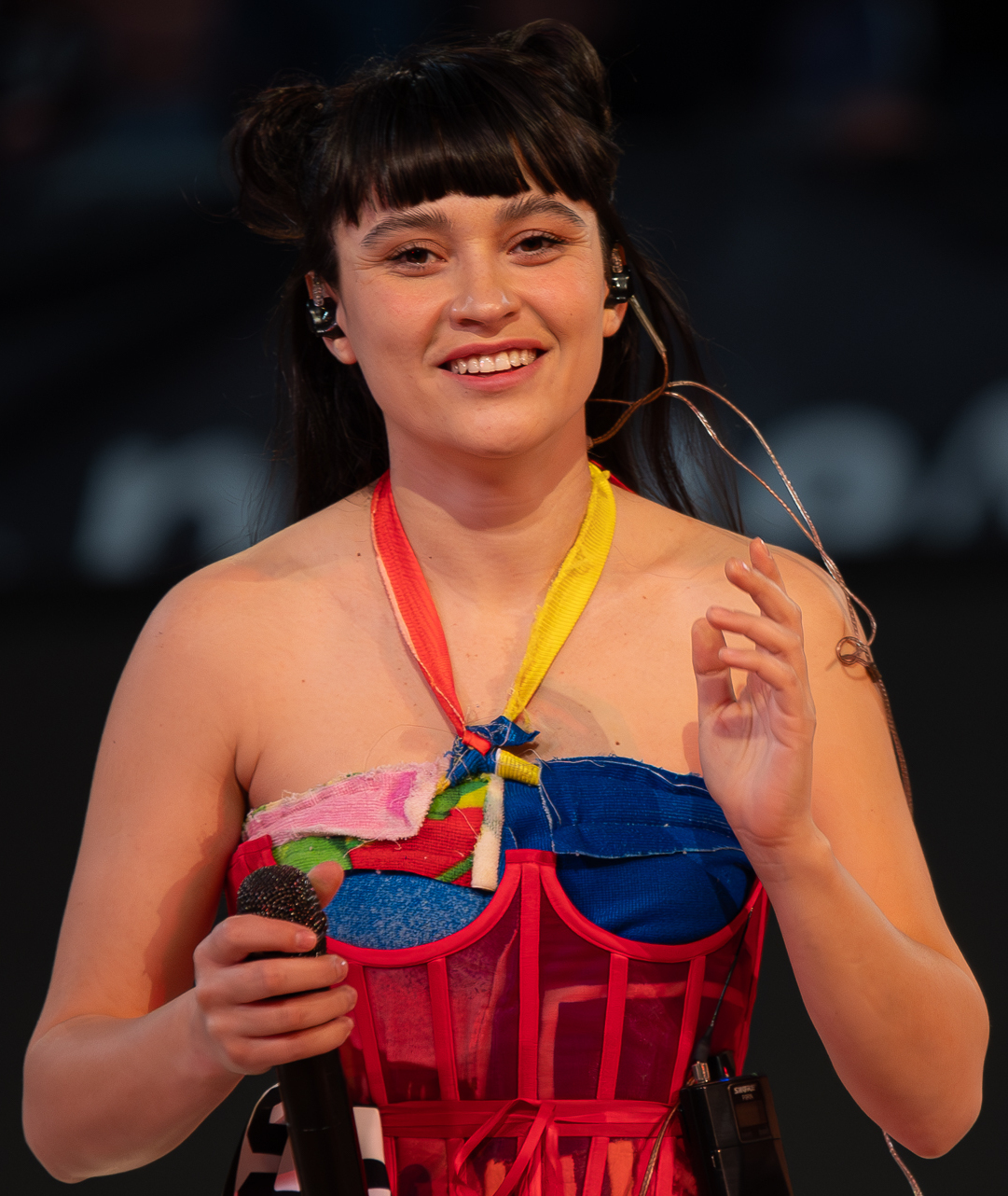
- Rimes in 2024

Background information
- Also known as: Irina Remesh; Irra
- Born: Irina Rîmeș; 22 August 1991 (age 35); Izvoare, SSR Moldova
- Genres: Rock, Pop, Folk
- Occupations: singer; songwriter
- Years active: 2016–present
- Labels: Global Records; Quantum Music

Irina Rimes (born Irina Râmeș on August 22, 1991) is a Moldovan singer-songwriter who established herself as one of the leading music artists in Romania and Moldova since the late 2010s. She was one of the four coaches of the Romanian talent show Vocea României. Rimes works and lives in Bucharest, Chișinău, and Paris.

In 2019, Rimes was chosen by Warner Bros Animation to provide the Romanian voice of Whatevra Wanabi in the animated movie The Lego Movie 2. Besides her native Romanian, she speaks Russian, English and French.

== Life and career ==
=== 1991–2015: Childhood and beginnings in music ===
Irina was born on 22 August 1991 in the Florești District and is the first child of Valentina and Fiodor Rîmeș; she has a younger brother, Vitali. Irina has stated in interviews that her family nourished her interest for music, especially her father and paternal grandmother, the latter of which had a very good voice, according to Irina — "grandma used to be a part of a church choir and I remember how she would sit on the stove and sing carols to us". Rimes manifested an interest towards writing and composing from an early age: "I started writing poetry when I was in grade 0. I remember that I learned to sing, write and read at home." The artist moved to Soroca when she started studying at the "Constantin Stere" Theoretical High School until 2010; she later graduated from the Academy of Music, Theater and Plastic Arts in Chișinău. In 2012, Irina Rimes participated in the talent show Fabrica de staruri, where she was a finalist.

=== 2016–present: "Visele" and Despre el ===
Rimes moved to Romania in 2016, when she signed with Quantum Music. Her first single, "Visele" (The dreams), peaked at #1 in Romania Airplay 100 in 2016 and got her an award for the best début of the year at the Radio România Music Awards in 2017. Rimes has also penned songs for various Romanian artists, such as Inna, Raluka, Andra, Alina Eremia, Nicoleta Nucă and Antonia. The Romanian branch of Cosmopolitan named her "the revelation of 2016". In 2017, Rimes signed a contract with Universal Music France and released her first album, Despre el (About him). From 2018 to 2026, she was one of the four coaches of Vocea României. In 2019, Irina Rimes gave an exclusive interview about her career to Turkey's biggest digital music magazine ÖMC Dergi (Dergi), became the cover star of a magazine for the first time in Turkey.

During the COVID-19 period, Irina started learning French, and wrote songs for herself. In 2023, she published the song " Changer " which is in French. She debuted " Changer " in France in September 2023 in Pont-à-Mousson.

On Jun 29, 2024 she released a new album "Origini".

== Discography ==
=== Albums ===
- Despre el (2017)
- Cosmos (2018)
- Pastila (2020)
- Acasă (2022)
- Origini (2024)

=== Singles ===
==== As lead artist ====
Title	Year	ROU	CIS	Album
"Visele"	2016	1	—	Despre el
"Ce s-a întâmplat cu noi"	2017	11	—	Despre el
"My Favourite Man"	2017	29	—	Non-album single
"Bolnavi amândoi"	2017	5	—	Despre el
"Beau"	2018	52	—	Cosmos
"În locul meu"	2018	—	—	Cosmos
"Cel mai bun prieten"	2018	—	—	Cosmos
"Cel mai bun DJ(feat. The Motans)"	2018	15	—	Cosmos
"Nu știi tu să fii bărbat"	2018	9	—	Cosmos
"In palme"	2019	15	—	Non-album single
"3 Inimi (feat Carla's Dreams)"	2020	15	—	Non-album single
"Your Love"(feat Cris Cab)	2020	6	142	Non-album single
"N-avem timp"	2021	2	102	Acasă
"Навсегда" (with Jah Khalib) / "Pentru totdeauna" (with Grasu XXL)	2021	3	159	Acasă
"Ba ba ba (Inima mea bate)"	2022	1	—	Non-album single
"Ielele"(with David Ciente)	2022	—	—	Non-album single
"Acasă"	2022	7	—	Acasă
"Gata de zbor" (with The Motans)		—	—	
"Laisse tomber les filles" (with David Goldcher)		—	—	Non-album single

==== Promotional singles ====
Title	Year	ROU	Album
"Iubirea noastră mută"	2016	84	Despre el
"Da' ce tu"	2016	—	Despre el
"Haina ta"	2016	—	Despre el
"Bandana" (feat. Killa Fonic)	2017	97	Despre el
"Cosmos"	2017	—	Despre el
"Octombrie Roșu"	2017	—	Despre el
"Eroii pieselor noastre"	2017	—	Despre el
"Dans"	2019	—	Cosmos
"24:00"	2019	—	Cosmos
"Ce se intampla, doctore?"	2019	—	Cosmos
"Nicaieri"	2019	—	Cosmos
"Dorule"	2019	—	Cosmos
"Baiatul Meu Frumos"	2020	—	Cosmos
"Sarea de pe rana"	2020	41	Cosmos
"Perfectul Imperfect"	2020	—	Pastila

==== As a featured artist ====
Title	Year	ROU	RUS	Album
"I Loved You" (DJ Sava feat. Irina Rimes)	2016	24	26	Non-album single
"Cupidon" (Guess Who feat. Irina Rimes)	2017	4	—	Un Anonim Celebru
"Piesa noastră" (Killa Fonic feat. Irina Rimes)	2017	—	—	Lama Crima
"Stai lângă mine" (Vunk feat. Irina Rimes)	2017	—	—	Extrovertit
"POEM" (The Motans feat. Irina Rimes)	2019	1	—	My Rhythm & Soul
"Schhh" (Mahmut Orhan feat. Irina Rimes)	2019	—	—	Non-album single
"Hero" (Mahmut Orhan feat. Irina Rimes)	2019	—	—	Non-album single
"Nu Vreau" (Mahmut Orhan feat. Irina Rimes)	2020	—	—	Non-album single

==== As a songwriter for other artists ====
Year	Song	Artist	Co-writers	Album
2016	"Ieri erai”	Raluka	Raluca Nistor; Theea Miculescu; Alexandru Antonescu; Marius Ivancea	Non-album single
2016	"Zbor”	Raluka	Raluca Nistor; Catalin Tamazlicaru; Andrei Ioniță	Non-album single
2016	"Cum ar fi?”	Inna	Alexandra Apostoleanu	Nirvana
2017	"Dor de tine”	Antonia	Alex Cotoi	Non-album single
2017	"Poartă-mă”	Alina Eremia	—	360
2017	"Sunt puternică”	Andra	—	Iubirea schimbă tot
2017	"Minte-mă”	Karmen	Achi Petre; Vlad Lucan	Non-album single
2017	"Du-mă spre noi”	Raluka		Non-album single
2017	"Ai uitat cine ești”	Nicoleta Nucă		Non-album single
2018	"Nu acum”	Ilinca	—	Non-album single
2018	"CSF, n-ai CSF”	Ana Baniciu	—	Non-album single
2018	"Undone”	Raluka	Nicoleta Gavriliță	Non-album single
