= Inna discography =

Artist discography

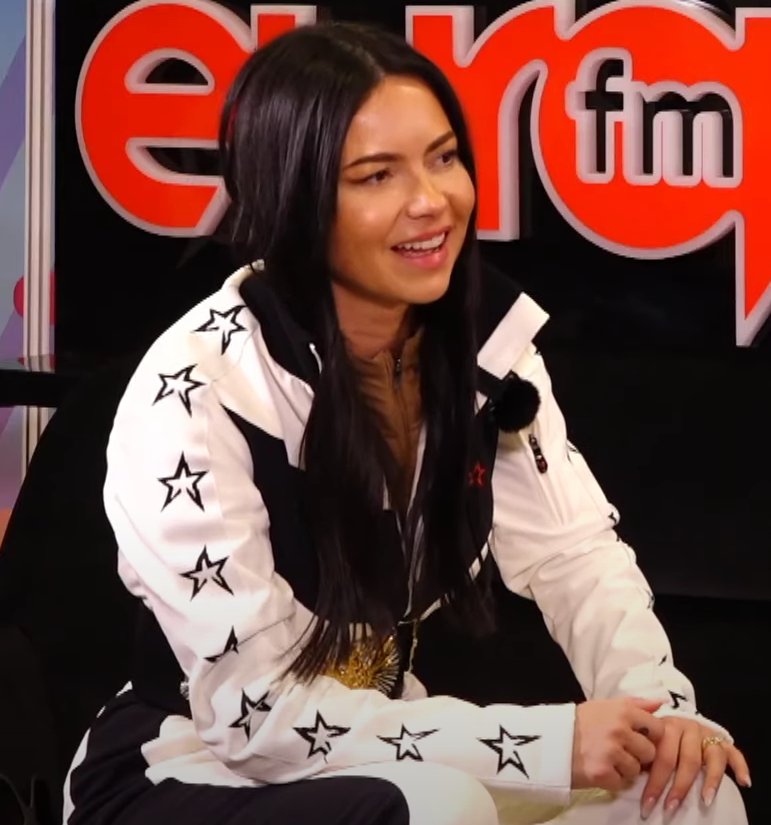
- Inna during a 2023 interview
- Studio albums: 11
- Compilation albums: 3
- Singles: 49
- Music videos: 79
- Promotional singles: 51
- As featured artist: 16

Romanian singer Inna has released eleven studio albums, three compilations, 65 singles (including 16 as featured artist) and 51 promotional singles. Her YouTube channel surpassed three billion total views as of May 2019. 24 of her singles have reached the top ten in Romania, with "Hot", "Amazing", "Diggy Down", "Bebe", "Up", "Tare" and "7 zile" topping the country's singles chart in 2008, 2009, 2015, 2020, 2021, 2022 and 2026, respectively. With global album sales of four million copies from her first three studio albums, Inna is the best-selling Romanian artist.

The singer began her career after releasing her debut single, "Hot", produced by native trio Play & Win in 2008. Reaching the top 20 across multiple charts, it achieved commercial success worldwide and was certified Gold in Italy, Silver in the United Kingdom and Platinum in Spain. Throughout 2009 and early 2010, she released four more singles from her debut studio album, Hot (2009), which sold 500,000 copies worldwide. "Amazing"—released from Hot—peaked atop the Romanian chart, while "10 Minutes" marked the fourth time that Inna reached the top 10 in France. Inna's second record, I Am the Club Rocker, was made available for purchase in 2011, and included a collaboration with American hip-hop recording artist Flo Rida and Spanish singer Juan Magán on a remix of "Club Rocker" and on "Un Momento", respectively. The album's lead single, "Sun Is Up", was certified Gold in Italy, Switzerland, and the United Kingdom.

Roton distributed the singer's third studio album, Party Never Ends, in March 2013. The record spawned "Tu şi eu", the Romanian-language version of "Crazy Sexy Wild", which peaked at number five in Romania. "More than Friends", a collaboration with American reggaeton performer Daddy Yankee, reached number seven in Spain and was certified Gold for video streams of four million. In 2015, Inna released her eponymous fourth studio album and its Japanese counterpart, Body and the Sun. The first single off the Japanese release, "Cola Song", features Colombian reggaeton singer J Balvin as a guest vocalist. The track was a commercial success in Europe, and was certified Platinum in Spain. "Diggy Down", the first single from Inna, scored the singer's third number one single in her native country, while the follow-up "Bop Bop" reached number two.

In the span of one year, Inna released four singles, "Heaven" (2016), "Gimme Gimme" (2017), "Ruleta" (2017) and "Nirvana" (2017) to commercial success in selected European countries. The latter three were included on her fifth studio album Nirvana (2017). Her first Spanish-language album Yo was released in May 2019, spawning the single "Iguana" which reached number four in Romania. The non-album release "Bebe" with Ugandan artist Vinka peaked at number one in March 2020. She released her seventh studio album Heartbreaker in November 2020, which was aided by its lead single "Flashbacks" that attained chart success in the radio rankings of several countries, including those of Romania and the Commonwealth of Independent States. Prior the release of the two-part album Champagne Problems in 2022, "Up" (2021), a non-album single also released as a collaboration with Jamaican recording artist Sean Paul, became Inna's fifth number-one in her native country and entered several rankings elsewhere.

== Albums ==
=== Studio albums ===
==== English studio albums ====
List of English studio albums, with selected chart positions, sales and certifications
Title	Album details	Peak chart positions										Sales	Certifications
Title	Album details	BEL (Fl)	BEL (Wa)	CZR	FRA	JPN	MEX	NLD	POL	SPA	UK	Sales	Certifications
Hot	Released: 4 August 2009; Label: Magic; Format: CD, digital download, streaming	37	14	7	9	—	54	68	28	77	32	WW: 500,000 (Note: Sales of Hot as of December 2011); POL: 20,000 (Note: Sales of Hot in Poland as of March 2010)	UPFR: Gold; SNEP: Platinum
I Am the Club Rocker	Released: 19 September 2011; Label: Roton; Format: CD, digital download, streaming	— (Note: I Am the Club Rocker did not enter the Ultratop Albums Top 200 chart, but peaked at number two on the Heatseekers Albums chart.)	15	12	23	45	8	—	—	—	—	FRA: 15,000 (Note: Sales of I Am the Club Rocker in France as of August 2012.); JPN: 7,691 (Note: Sales of I Am the Club Rocker in Japan as of October 2011)	ZPAV: Gold
Party Never Ends (Note: At the same time as the Japanese release of Party Never Ends on 3 July 2013, a Japan-only issue, Party Never Ends 2, containing ten additional tracks was also released. It peaked at number 152 on the Japanese Albums Chart and sold 913 copies.)	Released: 4 March 2013; Label: Roton; Format: CD, digital download, streaming	—	—	—	—	88	10	—	—	—	—	JPN: 6,967 (Note: Sales of Party Never Ends in Japan as of June 2013)	
Inna (Note: Prior to the release of Inna, a Japanese version of the album titled Body and the Sun was issued.)	Released: 30 October 2015; Label: Empire, Roton; Format: CD, digital download, streaming	—	—	—	—	157	45	—	—	—	—	JPN: 760 (Note: Sales of Body and the Sun in Japan as of August 2015)	
Nirvana	Released: 11 December 2017; Label: Global, UMG; Format: CD, digital download, streaming	—	—	—	—	—	—	—	—	—	—		
Heartbreaker	Released: 27 November 2020; Label: Global; Format: Digital download, streaming	—	—	—	—	—	—	—	—	—	—		
Champagne Problems	Released: 7 January/11 March 2022 (Note: The album was released in two parts, Champagne Problems #DQH1 and Champagne Problems #DQH2, which were issued on 7 January and 11 March 2022, respectively.); Label: Global; Format: Digital download, streaming	—	—	—	—	—	—	—	—	—	— (Note: Champagne Problems #DQH1 did not enter the UK Albums Chart, but peaked at number 72 on the UK Album Downloads Chart.)		
Just Dance	Released: 10 February/14 April 2023 (Note: The album was released in two parts, Just Dance #DQH1 and Just Dance #DQH2, which were issued on 10 February and 14 April 2023, respectively.); Label: Global; Format: Digital download, streaming	—	—	—	—	—	—	—	—	—	—		
Everything or Nothing	Released: 1 March/19 July 2024 (Note: The album was released in two parts, Everything or Nothing #DQH1 and Everything or Nothing #DQH2, which were issued on 1 March and 19 July 2024, respectively.); Label: Global; Format: Digital download, streaming	—	—	—	—	—	—	—	—	—	—		
"—" denotes a release that did not chart or was not released in that territory.

==== Spanish studio albums ====
List of Spanish studio albums
Title	Album details
Yo	Released: 31 May 2019; Label: Global, Roc Nation; Format: CD, LP, digital download, streaming
El Pasado	Released: 5 April 2024; Label: Global; Format: LP, Digital download, streaming

=== Compilations ===
List of compilations, with selected chart positions
Title	Album details	Peak chart positions
Title	Album details	FRA
Best Of	Released: 18 December 2015; Label: Universal; Format: CD, digital download	—
Summer Hits	Released: 16 June 2017; Label: Roton; Format: Digital download	—
10 ans de hits!	Released: 22 June 2018; Label: MCA; Format: CD, digital download	93
"—" denotes a release that did not chart or was not released in that territory.

== Singles ==
=== As lead artist ===
==== 2000s ====
List of singles in the 2000s decade, with selected chart positions, sales, and certifications
Title	Year	Peak chart positions											Sales	Certifications	Album
Title	Year	ROM (Note: Notes concerning the Romanian peaks: Due to the lack of national chart Romanian Top 100 archives for the late 2000s, the airplay charts published at that time by Nielsen Music Control and Uniunea Producătorilor de Fonograme din România (UPFR) are taken into consideration for "Hot", "Love", "Déjà Vu", "Amazing" and "10 Minutes". It is unknown whether the two were affiliated with the Romanian Top 100, however their charts are reliable.; The Airplay 100 replaced the Romanian Top 100 as Romania's national chart in February 2012 after the latter ceased its weekly issuing, but ended itself in November 2021. As of that month, UPFR resumed publishing airplay charts, and they are taken into consideration for Romanian peaks.; Romania Songs, Billboard's streaming and digital download-based chart inaugurated in February 2022, is taken into consideration for Romanian peaks after the Airplay 100's cancellation in November 2021 interchangeably with the UPFR charts.; The TopHit Romania Airplay chart inaugurated in January 2023, is taken into consideration for Romanian peaks below The Top 25 interchangeably with the UPFR charts)	CIS	CZR	EUR	FRA	GER	ITA	SLK	SPA	SWI	UK	Sales	Certifications	Album
"Hot"	2008	1	2	3	10	6	80	33	38	1	17	6	FRA: 80,000 (Note: Sales of "Hot" in France and the United Kingdom as of September 2010); SPA: 65,000 (Note: Sales of "Hot" in Spain as of May 2011); UK: 250,000	BPI: Silver; FIMI: Gold; PROMUSICAE: Platinum	Hot
"Love"	2009	4	144	8	—	—	—	—	5	31	—	—			Hot
"Déjà Vu" (with Bob Taylor) (Note: During its release process, "Déjà Vu" has been credited differently, including to "Bob Taylor feat. Inna" or to "Inna feat. Bob Taylor".)	2009	6	4	16	23	6	—	—	72	15	27	60			Hot
"Amazing"	2009	1	3	49	10	2	36	95	41	—	10	14	FRA: 100,000 (Note: Sales of "Amazing" in France as of September 2010)	BPI: Silver	Hot
"—" denotes a recording that did not chart or was not released in that territory.

==== 2010s ====
List of singles in the 2010s decade, with selected chart positions, and certifications
Title	Year	Peak chart positions											Certifications	Album
Title	Year	ROM	CIS	CZR	FRA	GER	ITA	JPN	SLK	SPA	SWI	UK	Certifications	Album
"10 Minutes" (featuring Play & Win)	2010	11	85	10	8	—	—	—	34	—	—	—		Hot
"Sun Is Up"	2010	2	3	31	2	26	30	—	20	22	3	15	BPI: Gold; FIMI: Gold; IFPI SWI: Gold	I Am the Club Rocker
"Club Rocker" (solo or featuring Flo Rida)	2011	42	39	39	32	55	89	55	11	—	64	—		I Am the Club Rocker
"Un Momento" (featuring Juan Magán)	2011	12	64	—	42	—	88	—	4	46	—	—		I Am the Club Rocker
"Endless"	2011	5	181	51	—	—	—	—	9	—	—	—		I Am the Club Rocker
"Wow"	2012	10	171	—	—	—	—	—	—	—	—	—		I Am the Club Rocker
"Caliente"	2012	84	—	—	—	—	99	—	—	—	—	—		Party Never Ends (Note: "Be My Lover" was only present on the deluxe edition of Party Never Ends.)
"Crazy Sexy Wild" (Note: A Romanian language version of the song, "Tu și eu", was released in Romania.)	2012	5	—	—	—	—	—	49	—	—	—	—		Party Never Ends
"Inndia" (featuring Play & Win)	2012	10	—	—	—	—	—	—	—	—	—	—		Party Never Ends
"More than Friends" (featuring Daddy Yankee)	2013	20	—	—	92	—	52	—	5	7	—	—	PROMUSICAE: Gold	Party Never Ends
"Be My Lover" (solo or featuring Juan Magán)	2013	—	—	—	—	—	—	—	—	—	—	—		Party Never Ends
"In Your Eyes" (featuring Yandel)	2013	44	155	—	—	—	—	—	—	31	—	—		Party Never Ends
"Cola Song" (featuring J Balvin)	2014	34	154	70	—	77	93	—	14	8	36	—	PROMUSICAE: Platinum	Body and the Sun / Party Never Ends (Note: "Cola Song" and "Good Time" were only present on the United States version of Party Never Ends.) / Inna (Note: "Cola Song", "Take Me Higher", "Good Time" and "Summer Days" are included on Inna's 2020 Complete Edition issued to SoundCloud.)
"Good Time" (featuring Pitbull)	2014	67	—	—	—	—	—	—	—	—	—	—		Body and the Sun / Party Never Ends / Inna
"Diggy Down" (featuring Marian Hill or the latter and Yandel) (Note: The version featuring Yandel was not included on the albums listed.)	2014	1	—	—	—	—	—	—	—	—	—	—		Inna / Body and the Sun
"We Wanna" (with Alexandra Stan featuring Daddy Yankee)	2015	59	—	72	—	—	60	72	39	83	—	—	FIMI: Gold	Inna (Note: "We Wanna" was only present on the Turkish, Polish and Mexican versions of Inna.) / Unlocked (Note: "We Wanna" was only present on the German version of Unlocked.) / Alesta / Nirvana (Note: "We Wanna" was only present on the Japanese version of Nirvana.)
"Bop Bop" (featuring Eric Turner)	2015	2	—	—	—	—	—	—	—	—	—	—		Inna / Body and the Sun
"Yalla"	2015	13	—	—	—	—	—	—	—	—	—	—		Inna / Body and the Sun
"Rendez Vous"	2016	45	—	—	—	—	—	—	—	—	—	—		Inna / Body and the Sun
"Heaven"	2016	4	151	—	—	—	—	—	—	—	—	—		Nirvana (Note: "Heaven", "Say It With Your Body" and "No Help" are included on Nirvana's 2020 deluxe edition issued to SoundCloud.)
"Gimme Gimme"	2017	16	—	—	—	—	—	—	—	—	—	—		Nirvana
"Ruleta" (Note: A partly French language version of the song titled "La roulette" was released in 2018, crediting DJ Sem as a fellow lead artist while leaving out Erik as a featured artist in favour of Matt Houston.) (featuring Erik)	2017	3	—	—	—	—	—	—	27	45	—	—		Nirvana
"Nirvana"	2017	2	—	—	—	—	—	—	—	—	—	—		Nirvana
"Me Gusta"	2018	89	—	—	—	—	—	—	—	—	—	—		Non-album singles
"Pentru că" (featuring The Motans)	2018	3	—	—	—	—	—	—	—	—	—	—		Non-album singles
"No Help"	2018	65	—	—	—	—	—	—	—	—	—	—		Nirvana
"Ra"	2018	71	—	—	—	—	—	—	—	—	—	—		Yo
"Iguana"	2018	4	—	—	—	—	—	—	—	—	—	—		Yo
"Sin Ti"	2019	—	—	—	—	—	—	—	—	—	—	—		Yo
"Tu Manera"	2019	78	—	—	—	—	—	—	—	—	—	—		Yo
"Te Vas"	2019	36	—	—	—	—	—	—	—	—	—	—		Yo
"Bebe" (with Vinka)	2019	1	—	—	—	—	—	—	—	—	—	—		Non-album single
"—" denotes a recording that did not chart or was not released in that territory.

==== 2020s ====
List of singles in the 2020s decade, with selected chart positions and certifications
Title	Year	Peak chart positions										Certifications	Album
Title	Year	ROM Air.	CIS Air.	CZE Air.	FIN	FRA	GER Dig.	HUN	POL Air.	RUS Air.	US Dance/ Elec.	Certifications	Album
"Not My Baby"	2020	33	—	—	—	—	—	—	—	—	—		Non-album singles
"VKTM" (with Sickotoy and The Anti Group)	2020	92	—	—	—	—	—	—	—	—	—		Non-album singles
"Discoteka" (with Minelli)	2020	62	—	—	—	—	—	—	—	—	—		Non-album singles
"Read My Lips" (featuring Fariana)	2020	10	156	—	—	—	—	—	—	—	—		Non-album singles
"Flashbacks"	2021	4	2	—	—	—	—	—	—	1	—		Heartbreaker
"Cool Me Down" (with Gromee)	2021	—	147	12	—	—	—	—	2	—	—	ZPAV: Gold	Tiny Sparks
"It Don't Matter" (with Alok and Sofi Tukker)	2021	—	5	—	—	—	—	5	3	2	27	ZPAV: Platinum	Non-album single
"Maza" (solo or French and US Version with Black M and Thutmose, respectively)	2021	43	—	—	—	—	—	—	—	—	—		Heartbreaker (Note: "Maza" is a marginally remastered version of "Maza Jaja", which had been included on Heartbreaker and served as one of its initial promotional singles.)
"Papa" (with Sickotoy and Elvana Gjata)	2021	18	—	—	—	—	—	—	—	—	—		Non-album singles
"Up" (solo or with Sean Paul)	2021	1	1	7	17	125	33	2	1	1	—	ZPAV: Platinum	Non-album singles
"Tare" (with The Motans)	2022	1	91	—	—	—	—	—	—	—	—		Non-album singles
"Talk" (with Ilkay Sencan)	2022	—	—	—	—	—	—	—	—	—	—		Non-album singles
"Wherever You Go" (solo or with Reynmen)	2022	—	—	65	—	—	—	—	—	—	—		Non-album singles
"Yummy" (solo or with Stefflon Don and Dhurata Dora)	2022	—	86	60	—	—	—	—	12	—	—		Non-album singles
"Rock My Body" (with R3hab and Sash!)	2023	2	13	—	—	32	—	—	—	15	—	SNEP: Platinum; ZPAV: Platinum	Non-album singles
"Bad Girls" (with Sickotoy, Antonia and Eva Timush)	2023	179	—	—	—	—	—	—	—	—	—		Non-album singles
"Dance Alone" (with The Victor)	2023	194	—	—	—	—	—	—	—	—	—		Non-album singles
"Cheeky"	2024	38	—	—	—	—	—	—	—	—	—		Everything Or Nothing
"Stuck in Limbo" (with Vinai and Jayover)	2024	—	155	—	—	—	—	—	—	112	—		Non-album singles
"Queen of My Castle" (with Kris Kross Amsterdam)	2024	21	168	—	—	74	—	—	—	—	—	SNEP: Gold	Non-album singles
"Take Me Home (Know You Better)" (with Makar)	2024	—	—	—	—	—	—	—	—	—	—		Non-album singles
"Bilet doar dus"	2024	6	—	—	—	—	—	—	—	—	—		Non-album singles
"Let It Talk to Me" (with Sean Paul)	2025	6	182	—	—	—	—	—	—	—	—		Non-album singles
"I'll Be Waiting" (with R3hab)	2025	10	1	—	—	—	—	—	—	1	—		Non-album singles
"Mayana" (with MoBlack)	2025	103	—	—	—	—	—	—	—	—	—		Non-album singles
"In Love" (with Minelli)	2025	181	—	—	—	—	—	—	—	—	—		Non-album singles
"7 zile" (with Florian Rus)	2025	1	99	—	—	—	—	—	—	—	—		Non-album singles
"Dream Out Loud" (with Matoma)	2026	—	—	—	—	—	—	—	—	—	—		Non-album singles
"Ya Tabtab" (featuring Char Bell)	2026	—	—	—	—	—	—	—	—	—	—		Non-album singles
"Wizz Away"	2026	—	—	33	—	—	—	—	—	—	—		Non-album singles
"Morenito"	2026	2	75	—	—	—	—	—	—	—	—		Non-album singles
"—" denotes a recording that did not chart or was not released in that territory.

=== As featured artist ===
List of singles as featured artist, with selected chart positions
Single	Year	Peak chart positions							Album
Single	Year	ROM	CIS	MDA Air.	NLD Tip	SWE Heat.	SWI	US Dance/ Elec.	Album
"Boom Boom" (Brian Cross featuring Inna)	2013	—	—	—	—	—	—	—	Pop Star / Party Never Ends (Note: "Boom Boom" was only present on the Japanese deluxe edition of Party Never Ends.)
"P.O.H.U.I." (Carla's Dreams featuring Inna)	2013	3	—	7	—	—	—	—	Ngoc / Party Never Ends (Note: "P.O.H.U.I." was only present on the Romanian bonus tracks edition of Party Never Ends.)
"Everybody" (DJ BoBo and Inna)	2013	—	—	—	—	—	60	—	Reloaded / Party Never Ends (Note: "Everybody" and "Oare" are included on Party Never Ends's 2020 Ultimate Edition issued to SoundCloud.)
"Piñata 2014" (Andreas Schuller featuring Inna)	2013	—	—	—	—	—	—	—	Russ Dekknavn 2014
"Strigă!" (Puya featuring Inna)	2014	2	—	—	—	—	—	—	Non-album singles
"Fie ce-o fi" (Dara featuring Inna, Antonia & Carla's Dreams)	2014	55	—	4	—	—	—	—	Non-album singles
"Summer in December" (Morandi featuring Inna)	2014	80	133	—	—	—	—	—	Inna / Body and the Sun
"Mai stai" (3 Sud Est featuring Inna)	2015	25	—	—	—	—	—	—	Epic
"Show Me the Way" (Marco & Seba featuring Inna)	2017	44	—	—	—	—	—	—	Non-album single
"Tu și eu" (Carla's Dreams featuring Inna)	2017	53	—	—	—	—	—	—	Antiexemplu / Nirvana
"Fade Away" (Sam Feldt and Lush & Simon featuring Inna)	2017	—	—	—	21	—	—	—	Sunrise
"Nota de plată" (The Motans featuring Inna)	2017	6	—	—	—	—	—	—	My Gorgeous Drama Queens / Nirvana
"Stay" (Dannic featuring Inna)	2018	—	—	—	—	—	—	—	Non-album single
"Baila Conmigo" (Yellow Claw featuring Saweetie, Inna and Jenn Morel)	2019	—	—	—	—	—	—	—	Never Dies
"Summer's Not Ready" (Flo Rida featuring Inna and Timmy Trumpet)	2021	—	—	—	—	10	—	35	Non-album singles
"Echo" (Babasha with Inna)	2025	—	—	—	—	—	—	—	Non-album singles
"—" denotes a recording that did not chart or was not released in that territory.

=== Promotional singles ===
List of promotional singles, with selected chart positions
Title	Year	Peak chart positions						Album
Title	Year	ROM	CIS	FRA	MDA TV	RUS	TUR	Album
"I Need You for Christmas"	2009	—	146	—	—	—	—	Hot (Note: "I Need You For Christmas" was only present on the French version of Hot.)
"Ok"	2012	—	—	185	—	—	—	Party Never Ends (Note: "Spre mare" was only present on the Romanian bonus tracks edition of Party Never Ends, while "Dame Tu Amor" was solely featured on the album's deluxe edition.)
"Alright"	2012	—	—	—	—	—	—	Party Never Ends
"Oare"	2012	—	—	—	—	—	—	Party Never Ends
"J'adore"	2012	—	—	—	—	—	—	Party Never Ends
"Spre mare"	2013	19	—	—	6	—	—	Party Never Ends
"Dame Tu Amor" (featuring Reik)	2013	—	—	—	—	—	—	Party Never Ends
"Take Me Higher"	2014	—	—	—	—	—	—	Body and the Sun / Party Never Ends (Note: "Take Me Higher" was only present on the US version of Party Never Ends.) / Inna
"Low"	2014	—	—	—	—	—	—	Inna / Body and the Sun
"Devil's Paradise"	2014	—	—	—	—	—	—	Inna / Body and the Sun
"Tell Me"	2014	—	—	—	—	—	—	Inna / Body and the Sun
"Body and the Sun"	2014	—	—	—	—	—	—	Inna / Body and the Sun
"Summer Days"	2014	—	—	—	—	—	—	Inna
"Fata din rândul trei"	2014	33	—	—	—	—	—	Non-album promotional single
"Say It with Your Body"	2016	—	—	—	—	—	40	Nirvana
"Cum ar fi?"	2016	33	—	—	—	—	—	Nirvana
"Don't Mind"	2017	—	—	—	—	—	—	Nirvana
"Tropical"	2017	—	—	—	—	—	—	Nirvana
"Hands Up"	2017	—	—	—	—	—	—	Nirvana
"My Dreams"	2017	—	—	—	—	—	—	Nirvana
"Dream About the Ocean"	2017	—	—	—	—	—	—	Nirvana
"Lights"	2017	—	—	—	—	—	—	Nirvana
"La Vida" (Note: For a Romanian Coca-Cola campaign, Coca-Cola Zero Sugar bottles were designed with QR codes; when scanned with a smartphone, the QR codes linked to Shazam, allowing users to stream four songs—"Iguana", "La Vida", "Locura" and "Sí, Mamá".)	2018	—	—	—	—	—	—	Yo
"Locura"	2018	—	—	—	—	—	—	Yo
"Sí, Mamá"	2018	—	—	—	—	—	—	Yo
"Contigo"	2019	—	—	—	—	—	—	Yo
"Fuego"	2019	—	—	—	—	—	—	Yo
"Gitana"	2019	—	—	—	—	—	—	Yo
"Sober"	2020	—	—	—	—	—	—	Non-album promotional singles
"Nobody"	2020	—	—	—	—	—	—	Non-album promotional singles
"Call Me Now" (with Michael Calfan)	2020	—	—	—	—	—	—	Non-album promotional singles
"Pretty Thoughts" (with Henri Purnell and Nobody Cares)	2020	—	—	—	—	—	—	Non-album promotional singles
"Beautiful Lie"	2020	—	—	—	—	—	—	Heartbreaker
"Gucci Balenciaga"	2020	—	—	—	—	—	—	Heartbreaker
"Heartbreaker"	2020	—	—	—	—	—	—	Heartbreaker
"One Reason"	2020	—	—	—	—	—	—	Heartbreaker
"Sunset Dinner"	2020	—	—	—	—	—	—	Heartbreaker
"Thicky"	2020	—	—	—	—	—	—	Heartbreaker
"Till Forever"	2020	—	—	—	—	—	—	Heartbreaker
"You and I"	2020	—	—	—	—	—	—	Heartbreaker
"Oh My God"	2021	—	—	—	—	—	—	Non-album promotional singles
"Paris to London" (with Electric Chapel and Bastien)	2021	—	—	—	—	—	—	Non-album promotional singles
"Aici" (with Carla's Dreams, Irina Rimes and the Motans)	2021	—	—	—	—	—	—	Non-album promotional singles
"Party" (with Minelli and Romanian House Mafia)	2021	—	—	—	—	—	—	Non-album promotional singles
"Like That" (with Brian Cross)	2021	—	—	—	—	—	—	Non-album promotional singles
"Pretty Please" (with Gaullin)	2021	—	—	—	—	—	—	Non-album promotional singles
"De dragul tău"	2021	—	—	—	—	—	—	Non-album promotional singles
"Déjà-vu" (with Yves V and Janieck)	2022	—	—	—	—	—	—	Non-album promotional singles
"Magical Love"	2022	—	—	—	—	—	—	Non-album promotional singles
"Hello Hello" (with MELON & Dance Fruits Music)	2022	—	19	—	—	12	—	Non-album promotional singles
"Blow It Up" (with Timmy Trumpet & Love Harder)	2022	—	—	—	—	—	—	Non-album promotional singles
"My Crystal Nails"	2023	—	149	—	—	—	—	Non-album promotional singles
"Party Songs" (with Gamuel Sori)	2023	—	—	—	—	—	—	Non-album promotional singles
"Freak" (with Tujamo and Azteck)	2023	—	—	—	—	—	—	Non-album promotional singles
"—" denotes a recording that did not chart or was not released in that territory.

=== Other singles ===
List of other singles, with selected chart positions
Title	Year	Peak chart positions		Album
Title	Year	ROM	POL	Album
"Iarăși e Crăciunul" (as part of Kiss FM All Stars)	2014	—	—	Non-album singles
"Te rog" (Carla's Dreams, with uncredited vocals from Inna)	2015	1	—	Ngoc
"Tu tens la força" (Note: A charity single for La Marató 2015, "Tu tens la força" acts as a Catalan language cover of Gala's "Freed from Desire" (1996).)	2015	—	—	El Disc de La Marató 2015
"Call the Police" (as part of G Girls)	2016	64	6	Non-album singles
"Milk & Honey" (as part of G Girls)	2017	67	—	Non-album singles
"Poveste de Crăciun" (as part of Kiss FM All Stars)	2017	—	—	Non-album singles
"A venit Crăciunul" (as part of Kiss FM All Stars)	2020	—	—	Non-album singles
"Acasă de Crăciun" (as part of Kiss FM All Stars)	2021	—	—	Non-album singles
"Lalele" (Note: "Lalele" is a remake of Luigi Ionescu's "Lalele".)	2022	—	—	Non-album singles
"—" denotes a recording that did not chart or was not released in that territory.

=== Other charted songs ===
List of other charted songs
Title	Year	Peak chart positions		Album
Title	Year	ROM	TUR	Album
"Party Never Ends"	2013	—	40	Party Never Ends
"Dame la mano"	2024	12	—	El Pasado
"—" denotes a recording that did not chart or was not released in that territory.

== Guest appearances ==
List of guest appearances, with selected chart positions
Title	Year	Peak chart positions	Album
Title	Year	ROM Air.	Album
"All the Things" (Pitbull featuring Inna)	2013	—	Global Warming: Meltdown / Meltdown
"Ale Ale" (Dhurata Dora featuring Inna)	2023	—	Dhurata
"Complicated" (Jason Derulo and Inna)	2026	28	The Last Dance (Part 1)
"—" denotes a recording that did not chart or was not released in that territory.

== Music videos ==
List of music videos, with notes and directors
Title (Note: Solely lists official music videos.)	Year	Lead performer(s)	Guest performer(s)	Director(s)
"Hot" (True Love Edit)	2008	Inna	None	Florin Botea
"Hot" (Dancing in the Dark Edit)	2008	Inna	None	Florin Botea
"Love"	2009	Inna	None	Bogdan Bărbulescu
"Déjà Vu"	2009	Inna	Bob Taylor	Tom Boxer
"Amazing"	2009	Inna	None	Tom Boxer
"I Need You for Christmas"	2009	Inna	None	Tom Boxer
"10 Minutes"	2010	Inna	Play & Win	Paul Boyd
"Sun Is Up"	2010	Inna	None	Alex Herron
"Club Rocker"	2011	Inna	None	Alex Herron
"Un Momento"	2011	Inna	Juan Magán	Alex Herron
"Endless"	2011	Inna	None	Alex Herron
"Wow"	2012	Inna	None	Alex Herron
"Caliente"	2012	Inna	None	Hamid Bechiri / John Perez
"Crazy Sexy Wild"	2012	Inna	None	Edward Aninaru
"Tu şi eu"	2012	Inna	None	Edward Aninaru
"Inndia"	2012	Inna	Play & Win	Edward Aninaru
"More than Friends"	2013	Inna	None	Edward Aninaru
"More than Friends"	2013	Inna	Daddy Yankee	Edward Aninaru
"Dame Tu Amor"	2013	Inna	Reik	Inna / Khaled Mokhtar
"P.O.H.U.I."	2013	Carla's Dreams	Inna	Sergiu Barajin
"Spre mare"	2013	Inna	None	Bogdan Daragiu / Khaled Mokhtar
"Be My Lover"	2013	Inna	None	Inna / Khaled Mokhtar
"Be My Lover" (Remix)	2013	Inna	Juan Magán	Unknown
"In Your Eyes"	2013	Inna	Yandel	Barna Némethi
"Cola Song"	2014	Inna	J Balvin	John Perez
"Good Time"	2014	Inna	Pitbull	Barna Nemethi
"Fata din rândul trei"	2014	Inna	None	Bogdan Daragiu
"Strigă!"	2014	Puya	Inna	Marian Crisan / Tudor Mircea / Bogdan Daragiu / John Perez
"Diggy Down"	2014	Inna	Marian Hill	Michael Mircea
"Diggy Down" (Remix)	2014	Inna	Marian Hill / Yandel	Unknown
"Fie ce-o fi"	2014	Dara	Inna / Antonia / Carla's Dreams	Bogdan Daragiu
"Iarăși e Crăciunul"	2014	Kiss FM All Stars	None	Alex Coteț / Roxana Andrei
"Summer in December"	2014	Morandi	Inna	Michael Mircea
"Mai stai"	2015	3 Sud Est	Inna	Bogdan Daragiu
"We Wanna"	2015	Alexandra Stan / Inna	Daddy Yankee	Khaled Mokhtar / David Gal / Dimitri Caceaune
"Bop Bop"	2015	Inna	Eric Turner	Dimitri Caceaune / John Perez / David Gal
"Te rog"	2015	Carla's Dreams	Inna (uncredited)	Roman Burlaca
"Yalla"	2015	Inna	None	Barna Nemethi
"Rendez Vous"	2016	Inna	None	Michael Abt / John Perez
"Call the Police"	2016	G Girls	None	Roman Burlaca
"Heaven"	2016	Inna	None	John Perez
"Gimme Gimme"	2017	Inna	None	Edward Aninaru
"Milk & Honey"	2017	G Girls	None	Ionuț Trandafir
"Show Me the Way"	2017	Marco & Seba	Inna	Khaled Mokhtar
"Tu şi eu"	2017	Carla's Dreams	Inna	Roman Burlaca
"Ruleta"	2017	Inna	Erick	Barna Nemethi
"Fade Away"	2017	Sam Feldt	Lush & Simon / Inna	Barna Nemethi
"Nota de plată"	2017	The Motans	Inna	Ionuț Trandafir
"Nirvana"	2017	Inna	None	Bogdan Păun
"Poveste de Crăciun"	2017	Kiss FM All Stars	None	Roxana Andrei
"Me Gusta"	2018	Inna	None	Barna Nemethi
"Pentru că"	2018	Inna	The Motans	Bogdan Păun
"No Help"	2018	Inna	None	Bogdan Păun
"Ra"	2018	Inna	None	Bogdan Păun
"Iguana"	2018	Inna	None	Bogdan Păun
"Sin Ti"	2019	Inna	None	Bogdan Păun
"Tu Manera"	2019	Inna	None	Bogdan Păun
"Te Vas"	2019	Inna	None	Bogdan Păun
"Fuego"	2019	Inna	None	Bogdan Păun
"Gitana"	2019	Inna	None	Bogdan Păun
"Contigo"	2019	Inna	None	Bogdan Păun
"Sí, Mamá"	2019	Inna	None	Bogdan Păun
"Locura"	2019	Inna	None	Bogdan Păun
"La Vida"	2019	Inna	None	Bogdan Păun
"Bebe"	2019	Inna	Vinka	Bogdan Păun
"Not My Baby"	2020	Inna	None	Bogdan Păun
"Sober"	2020	Inna	None	Bogdan Păun
"VKTM"	2020	Sickotoy / Inna / TAG	None	Bogdan Păun
"Discoteka"	2020	Minelli / Inna	None	Bogdan Păun
"Read My Lips"	2020	Inna	Farina	Bogdan Păun / Jhonatan Abraham / Jhon Nael
"A venit Crăciunul"	2020	Kiss FM All Stars	None	Unknown
"Flashbacks"	2021	Inna	None	Bogdan Păun
"Cool Me Down"	2021	Gromee / Inna	None	Maciej Zdrojewski
"Maza"	2021	Inna	None	Bogdan Păun
"Papa"	2021	Sickotoy / Elvana Gjata / Inna	None	Bogdan Păun
"Aici"	2021	Carla's Dreams / Inna / Irina Rimes / The Motans	None	Bogdan Păun
"De dragul tău"	2021	Inna	None	Kobzzon
"Acasă de Crăciun"	2021	Kiss FM All Stars	None	Roxana Andrei
"Up"	2021	Inna / Sean Paul	None	Bogdan Păun
"Lalele"	2022	Inna	None	Dorin Marcu
"Tare"	2022	The Motans / Inna	None	Bogdan Păun
"Talk"	2022	Ilkay Sencan / Inna	None	Bogdan Păun
"Hello Hello"	2022	Inna / Melon / Dance Fruits Music	None	Florin Burlacu
"Yummy"	2022	Inna	None	Bogdan Păun
"Yummy"	2023	Inna, Dhurata Dora, Stefflon Don	None	Bogdan Păun
"My Crystal Nails"	2023	Inna	None	Bogdan Păun
"Rock My Body"	2023	R3hab, Inna, Sash!	None	Jimachez
"Party Songs"	2023	Gamuel Sori, Inna	None	Unknown
"Freak"	2023	Tujamo, Azteck, Inna	None	Paul Tatcu, Andrei Tapu, Alex Cotimani

== See also ==
- List of music released by Romanian artists that has charted in major music markets
- List of certified albums in Romania
- List of Romanian Top 100 number ones
- List of Airplay 100 number ones
