= Up (Inna song) =

- Solo version cover

Single by Inna
- Released: 21 October 2021
- Genre: Pop
- Length: 2:30
- Label: Warner; Global
- Songwriters: Elena Alexandra Apostoleanu; Sebastian Barac; Marcel Botezan; Alex Cotoi; Minelli
- Producers: Barac; Botezan; Cotoi

Inna singles chronology
"Papa" (2021)	"Up" (2021)	"Tare" (2022)

Alternative cover
- Cover artwork for the Sean Paul version; an alternative shot of Inna and Paul is used for Romanian music stores

"Up" is a song recorded by Romanian singer Inna. Global Records sent it to Romanian radio stations on 21 October 2021. Another version of the track with Jamaican rapper Sean Paul was issued on 17 December 2021. "Up" was written by Inna, Sebastian Barac, Marcel Botezan, Alex Cotoi and Minelli, while the production was handled by Barac, Botezan and Cotoi; Paul received additional writing and production credits on his version. "Up" is a dancehall-influenced pop song, with its lyrics describing a healing love.

Commercially, "Up" achieved success in Romania, where it became Inna's fifth number-one hit. It further topped the charts in Bulgaria, Russia, Poland, the Commonwealth of Independent States (CIS) and Ukraine. The Polish Society of the Phonographic Industry (ZPAV) awarded the song a Platinum certification in Poland. An accompanying music video for the Sean Paul version of the track was uploaded to Inna's YouTube channel on 17 December 2021. Directed by Bogdan Păun, it portrays Inna residing at a party with interspersed shots of Paul also being shown. For further promotion, "Up" was performed live on SuperStar România.

== Background and release ==
Sebastian Barac, Marcel Botezan and Alex Cotoi produced "Up", and wrote it with Elena Alexandra Apostoleanu (Inna) and Minelli. Global Records sent the single for radio airplay in Romania on 21 October 2021. A day later, it was released for digital download and streaming in various territories by Warner Music Poland and in Romania by Global. Another version of the song featuring verses from Sean Paul was similarly issued by the two aforementioned labels on 17 December 2021; Paul is credited as a co-lead artist alongside Inna and also received additional writing and production credits. Several remixes of the song's solo version were released, with one done by Romanian House Mafia featuring prominent house beats; Inna had previously collaborated with them on "Paris to London" (2021).

== Composition and lyrics ==
Musically, "Up" is a dancehall-influenced pop song, featuring Inna singing about what Anna-Kaye Kerr of Urban Islandz described as "overcoming past hurt and disappointment [and] opening her heart up again", as well as about "a love that lifts [her] up when everything in life seems to be going in the opposite direction", as noted by Adevărul's Maria-Alexandra Mortu. According to Rolling Stone India writers Anurag Tagat and David Britto, "the rhythms are a nod to both Romanian as well as Caribbean traditional music." Lyrics include: "Once upon a time, there was a girl who made a wish / To find herself a love and finally make a switch / Then you came around, you healed another stitch / And I'm glad about that, I can finally make the switch". The song's refrain—"When I'm down you can bring me up, up-p-p up-p-p up-p-p up-p-p / And when I'm hurt you know I don't need much / You can use that magic touch"—prompted a viral use of "Up" on the social networking service TikTok due to the title word's alteration. On the version of the track including his rap verses, Paul is "optimistic about his chance for romance", according to Kerr.

== Reception ==
Mortu praised "Up" as one of Inna's catchiest releases in her catalogue, further stating that it is "a hymn of fun and good mood[,] instantly giv[ing] a state of energy and optimism due to [its] fresh sound". Kerr commended Sean Paul's appearance as "smooth". Tagat and Britto deemed Paul's version a "buoyant reimagination" of the single. "Up" became popular on Shazam in multiple countries upon release, and originally reached a peak of number 51 on the last issue of Romania's Airplay 100 chart on the week ending 28 November 2021. The song eventually reached the top position on the airplay chart published by Uniunea Producătorilor de Fonograme din România (UPFR) on 28 December 2021, becoming Inna's fifth single to peak at number one in Romania after "Hot" (2008), "Amazing" (2009), "Diggy Down" (2015) and "Bebe" (2020). "Up" further reached number one in Bulgaria, Russia, Poland, the Commonwealth of Independent States (CIS), and Ukraine. In Poland, the single received a Platinum certification from the Polish Society of the Phonographic Industry (ZPAV). On 19 February 2022, Billboard inaugurated Romania Songs, a streaming and digital download-based chart for Romania, and the Sean Paul version of "Up" was listed at number 15. At the 2022 Romanian Music Awards, the single's Sean Paul version was nominated for Best Dance.

== Music videos and promotion ==
An accompanying lyric video for "Up" was uploaded to Inna's YouTube channel on 29 October 2021, and was directed by Bogdan Păun of NGM Creative. Alexandru Mureşan was further hired as the director of photography, while the make-up was done by Anca Buldur, the hair by Adonis Enache and the outfits selected by RDStyling. Mortu applauded Inna's styling in the visual, with her mainly being shown in the same setting as the single's cover art. The same aforementioned team was involved in the making of a music video for the Sean Paul version of "Up", released on Inna's YouTube account on 17 December 2021. It received over 1.2 million views in less than a day.

The music video opens with Inna walking into a room filled by partying people, wearing a black bodysuit with a transparent top. She resides there and, according to Kerr, "gyrat[es], which kick[s] into overdrive as everyone g[ets] up and start[s] partying, even dancing on top of the bar", showcasing eccentric dance moves. Paul is shown during his parts in front of a neon setting, sporting an all-black look. Further interspersed shots show Inna wearing a red outfit with oversized shoulder pads and red glasses as the sentences "Que nadie te limite me decía" ("Let no one limit you, he told me") and "Más de este amor ya no puede, puede ser" ("More of this love can no longer be, it can't be") are displayed on the screen, as well as show her sitting on a chair staring into the distance with other women behind her. An alternate video for the solo version of "Up" was released on 25 February 2022. To further promote the song, Inna performed the track live along with "De dragul tău" (2021) during the final of the first season of the singing competition SuperStar România on 17 December 2021.

== Track listing ==
- Official versions (Note: This acts as a summary of all digital versions of the single.)
1. "Up" – 2:30
2. "Up" (with Sean Paul) – 2:28
3. "Up (Casian Remix)" – 2:07
4. "Up" (Note: The Romanian House Mafia remix of the song has the latter credited as a co-lead artist alongside Inna.) – 2:00
5. "Up (Mert Hakan & Onur Betin Remix)" – 2:34
6. "Up (Robert Cristian Remix)" – 2:12
7. "Up (Arem Ozguc & Arman Aydin Remix)" – 2:16

== Charts ==
=== Weekly charts ===
Weekly chart performance for "Up"
Chart (2021–2023)	Peak position
Belarus Airplay (TopHit)	69
Bulgaria International (PROPHON)	1
CIS Airplay (TopHit)	1
CIS Airplay (TopHit) Sean Paul version	71
Croatia International Airplay (Top lista) Sean Paul version	12
Czech Republic Airplay (ČNS IFPI) Sean Paul version	7
Estonia Airplay (TopHit) Sean Paul version	157
Finland (Suomen virallinen lista) Sean Paul version	17
Finland Airplay (Radiosoittolista)	10
France (SNEP) Sean Paul version	125
Germany Download (Official German Charts)	33
Hungary (Rádiós Top 40)	2
Hungary (Dance Top 40)	8
Hungary (Single Top 40)	2
Kazakhstan Airplay (TopHit)	14
Latvia Airplay (TopHit) Sean Paul version	86
Lithuania Airplay (TopHit)	147
Moldova Airplay (TopHit) Sean Paul version	99
Poland Airplay (ZPAV)	1
Poland (Polish Airplay TV) Sean Paul version	3
Romania (Billboard Romania Songs) Sean Paul version	15
Romania (UPFR)	1
Romania Airplay (Media Forest)	1
Romania TV Airplay (Media Forest)	1
Russia Airplay (TopHit)	1
Ukraine Airplay (TopHit)	1

=== Monthly charts ===
Monthly chart performance for "Up"
Chart (2022)	Peak position
Russia Airplay (Tophit)	1
Ukraine Airplay (Tophit)	3

=== Year-end charts ===
2021 year-end chart performance for "Up"
Chart (2021)	Position
Romania Airplay (Media Forest)	50

2022 year-end chart performance for "Up"
Chart (2022)	Position
Hungary (Dance Top 40)	15
Hungary (Rádiós Top 40)	78
Hungary (Single Top 40)	14
Poland (ZPAV)	9
Romania Airplay (Media Forest)	8
Russia Airplay (TopHit)	2
Ukraine Airplay (TopHit)	22

2023 year-end chart performance for "Up"
Chart (2023)	Position
Belarus Airplay (TopHit)	101
Hungary (Dance Top 40)	30
Russia Airplay (TopHit)	152
Ukraine Airplay (TopHit)	75

2024 year-end chart performance for "Up"
Chart (2024)	Position
Kazakhstan Airplay (TopHit)	186

2025 year-end chart performance for "Up"
Chart (2025)	Position
Belarus Airplay (TopHit)	175
Kazakhstan Airplay (TopHit)	153

== Certifications ==
Certifications for "Up"
Region	Certification	Certified units/sales
Poland (ZPAV)	Platinum	50,000^{‡}
^{‡} Sales+streaming figures based on certification alone.

== Release history ==
Release dates and formats for "Up"
Country	Date	Format(s)	Version	Label	Ref.
Romania	21 October 2021	Radio airplay	Solo version	Global	
Various	22 October 2021	Digital download; streaming	Solo version	Warner	
Romania	22 October 2021	Digital download; streaming	Solo version	Global	
Various	17 December 2021	Digital download; streaming	Sean Paul version	Warner	
Romania	17 December 2021	Digital download; streaming	Sean Paul version	Global	

== See also ==
- List of music released by Romanian artists that has charted in major music markets
- List of Media Forest most-broadcast songs of the 2020s in Romania
