= Champagne Problems (album) =

- Champagne Problems #DQH1 cover

Studio album by Inna
- Released: 7 January 2022 (#DQH1); 11 March 2022 (#DQH2)
- Recorded: 2021
- Genre: Dance-pop
- Length: 23:02 (#DQH1); 21:27 (#DQH2)
- Language: English
- Label: Global
- Producer: Alexandru Cotoi; Sebastian Barac; Marcel Botezan; Viky Red; Alexandru Turcu

Inna chronology
| Heartbreaker (2020) | Champagne Problems (2022) | Just Dance (2023) |

Alternative cover
- Champagne Problems #DQH2 cover

Champagne Problems is the eighth studio album by Romanian singer Inna. It was released in two parts, Champagne Problems #DQH1 and Champagne Problems #DQH2, that were made available for digital download and streaming through Global Records on 7 January and 11 March 2022, respectively. Recording sessions took place in late 2021 for both releases and was completed in 16 days in a mansion Inna resided in with several Romanian songwriters and producers; such as Sebastian Barac, Marcel Botezan, David Ciente, Alexandru Cotoi, Minelli, Moa Pettersson Hammar and Gustav Nyström. The first release has been described as a primarily dance-pop record that encompasses Latin pop and reggaeton influences.

Inna vlogged the progress of Champagne Problems through her YouTube channel. The daily episodic videos were part of the second season of her Dance Queen's House series. Commercially, #DQH1 peaked at numbers 72 and 81 on the UK Album Downloads Chart and Germany Album Download Chart, respectively. In celebration of reaching seven million subscribers on her YouTube account, Inna performed songs from both parts of Champagne Problems in March 2022.

== Background and creation ==
On 27 November 2020, Inna released her seventh studio album Heartbreaker. Sessions for the album took place over a three-week period at a rented Bucharest mansion, where Inna resided in with Romanian songwriters and producers Sebastian Barac, Marcel Botezan, David Ciente, Alexandru Cotoi and Minelli. She documented the progress of the album with daily vlogs on her YouTube channel—which constituted the first season of her series Dance Queen's House. The second season provided viewers with the progress of Champagne Problems. The recording sessions began in late 2021 and lasted 16 days to complete. Ciente was replaced in favor of songwriters Moa Pettersson Hammar and Gustav Nyström, who were present on the selected dates.

The vlogs ran from 6 to 21 December 2021. By the third episode, Inna had recorded 20 songs in consideration for Champagne Problems. One of those songs, "De dragul tău", a promotional single released by Inna earlier in 2021, was revealed to have been recorded during the sessions for Champagne Problems in the fourth episode of the series. The final episode released on 21 December 2021, provided viewers a link to pre-order the album. The episode revealed the street date of 7 January 2022 for the first part of Champagne Problems, dubbed #DQH1, for digital download and streaming through Global Records. The label handled the release for the second part, Chamapgne Problems #DQH2, released on 11 March 2022.

== Composition and reception ==
#DQH1 is a dance-pop album with reggaeton and Latin pop influences, according to Matjaž Ambrožič of 24UR. Contrary to works done by Inna, the recording is performed entirely in English. Ambrožič praised #DQH1 as being "solid" and a "pleasing rhythmic pump" and enjoyed the melodies on the album as well as Inna's vocal delivery. Adevărul's Maria-Alexandru Mortu categorized the opener "Always on My Mind" as a dance song, praising the "catchy" refrain and "honest" lyrics, while Jon Caramanica of The New York Times found the title track as being "immaculate club-pop: ecstatic, bubbly, heartless". Musically, "Champagne Problems" is meant to resemble the spicy taste and is the result of a challenge presented to Inna and her team during the second season of Dance Queen's House.

Commercially, #DQH1 debuted and peaked at number 72 on the UK Album Downloads Chart published by The Official Charts Company (OCC) for the week ending 20 January 2022. It also reached number 81 on GfK Entertainment's Album Download Chart on 17 January 2022.

== Track listing ==
All lyrics written by Elena Alexandra Apostoleanu with additional help from Jordan Shaw, Minelli, Moa Pettersson Hammar, and Gustav Nyström on select tracks.

Credits adapted from Tidal.

Champagne Problems #DQH1 track listing
| No. | Title | Writer(s) | Producer(s) | Length |
|---|---|---|---|---|
| 1. | "Always on My Mind" | Elena Alexandra Apostoleanu; Sebastian Barac; Marcel Botezan; Alexandru Cotoi; Jordan Shaw | Barac; Botezan; Cotoi | 2:44 |
| 2. | "Champagne Problems" | Apostoleanu; Barac; Botezan; Cotoi; Shaw | Barac; Botezan; Cotoi | 2:47 |
| 3. | "Lonely" | Apostoleanu; Barac; Botezan; Cotoi; Luisa Luca | Barac; Botezan | 2:56 |
| 4. | "Love Bizarre" | Apostoleanu; Barac; Botezan; Cotoi; Luca | Barac; Botezan; Cotoi | 3:10 |
| 5. | "Baby" | Apostoleanu; Barac; Botezan; Cotoi; Luca | Barac; Botezan; Cotoi | 3:02 |
| 6. | "Fire & Ice" | Apostoleanu; Barac; Botezan; Cotoi; Luca | Barac; Botezan; Cotoi | 3:10 |
| 7. | "Solo" | Apostoleanu; Barac; Botezan; Cotoi; Luca | Barac; Botezan; Cotoi | 2:37 |
| 8. | "Ready Set Go" | Apostoleanu; Barac; Botezan; Cotoi; Moa Pettersson Hammar; Gustav Nyström | Cotoi | 2:36 |
| Total length: | | | | 23:02 |

Champagne Problems #DQH2 track listing
| No. | Title | Writer(s) | Producer(s) | Length |
|---|---|---|---|---|
| 1. | "Cryo" | Apostoleanu; Barac; Botezan; Cotoi; Luca; Nyström | Cotoi | 2:38 |
| 2. | "Millennium" | Apostoleanu; Barac; Botezan; Cotoi; Luca; Nyström | Botezan | 3:00 |
| 3. | "Take Me Home" | Apostoleanu; Barac; Botezan; Cotoi; Hammar | Barac; Cotoi | 2:32 |
| 4. | "Kumera" | Apostoleanu; Barac; Botezan; Cotoi; Luca | Barac; Botezan; Cotoi | 2:47 |
| 5. | "Oxygen" | Apostoleanu; Hammar; Nyström; Viky Red | Red; Alexandru Turcu | 2:52 |
| 6. | "Karma" | Apostoleanu; Barac; Botezan; Cotoi; Shaw | Barac; Botezan; Cotoi | 2:47 |
| 7. | "Breathless" | Apostoleanu; Barac; Botezan; Cotoi; Shaw | Barac; Botezan; Cotoi | 2:20 |
| 8. | "Don't Let Me Down" | Apostoleanu; Barac; Botezan; Cotoi; Luca | Barac; Botezan; Cotoi | 2:31 |
| Total length: | | | | 21:27 |

== Charts ==
Weekly chart performance for Champagne Problems #DQH1
| Chart (2022) | Peak position |
|---|---|
| Germany Album Downloads (Official German Charts) | 81 |
| UK Album Downloads (OCC) | 72 |

== Release history ==
Release history for Champagne Problems
| Region | Date | Format(s) | Version | Label | Ref. |
|---|---|---|---|---|---|
| Various | 7 January 2022 | Digital download; streaming | Champagne Problems #DQH1 | Global | |
| Various | 11 March 2022 | Digital download; streaming | Champagne Problems #DQH2 | Global | |

== See also ==
- List of music released by Romanian artists that has charted in major music markets
