= Heartbreaker (Inna album) =

Studio album by Inna
- Released: 27 November 2020
- Recorded: November 2020
- Genre: Dance-pop
- Length: 30:12
- Language: English; Spanish
- Label: Global
- Producer: Sebastian Barac; Marcel Botezan; David Ciente; Alexandru Cotoi

Inna chronology
Yo (2019)	Heartbreaker (2020)	Champagne Problems (2022)

Singles from Heartbreaker
- 1. "Flashbacks" Released: 20 January 2021; 2. "Maza" Released: 11 June 2021 (Note: "Maza" is a marginally remastered version of Heartbreaker's "Maza Jaja".)

Heartbreaker is the seventh studio album by Romanian singer Inna. It was released for streaming (Note: Japan is the only territory where Global Records made Heartbreaker available for digital download on 27 November 2020.) to YouTube and SoundCloud by Global Records on 27 November 2020, and was issued to fellow platforms and released for digital download a week later under the same label. An EDM, Middle Eastern and Latin-influenced dance-pop release, the album was preceded by Inna's retransition to the EDM genre following the release of Yo (2019), her experimental and gypsy-inspired sixth studio album.

Heartbreaker was created over the course of three weeks in a mansion where Inna resided with Romanian songwriters and producers Sebastian Barac, Marcel Botezan, David Ciente, Alexandru Cotoi and Minelli. To document the progress made on what was initially planned to be an extended play (EP), Inna uploaded daily YouTube vlogs that constituted the first season of her Dance Queen's House series. However, the EP was ultimately scrapped after the creation of over 50 songs to choose from. Heartbreaker was aided by the release of two singles—"Flashbacks" and "Maza". The former reached number one on Russia's radio ranking, and the top ten in Romania, Bulgaria, Ukraine, and the Commonwealth of Independent States.

== Background ==
Inna released her sixth studio album Yo in May 2019, which was jointly distributed by Global Records and Roc Nation. Containing songs written solely in Spanish, the singer took the entirety of creative control over the album and worked extensively with Romanian producer David Ciente. Inna described Yo's material as experimental and gypsy-influenced, marking a departure from her previous EDM work. With the release of "Bebe" in November 2019, Inna's fourth number one on the native Airplay 100 chart, she retransitioned to the EDM genre; it was the first in a string of several non-album singles.

== Creation and release ==
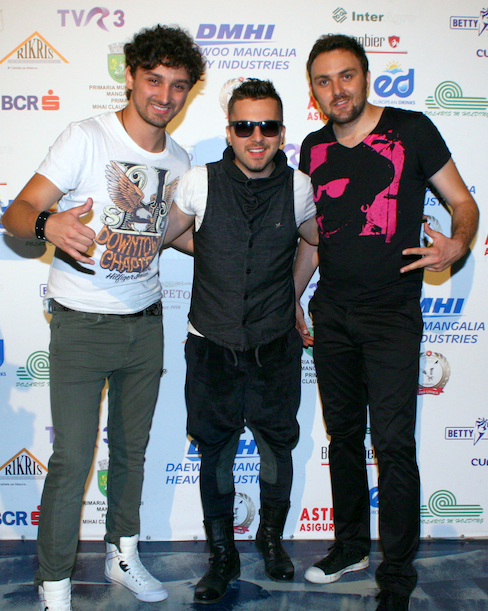
Marcel Botezan (first from left) and Sebastian Barac (third from left) were heavily involved in the album's creation.

Heartbreaker was created during a three-week period in November 2020 at a rented Bucharest mansion with two recording studios, in which Inna resided with Romanian songwriters and producers Sebastian Barac, Marcel Botezan, Ciente, Alexandru Cotoi and Minelli. Inna documented the progress made during daily vlogs on her YouTube channel—which constituted the first season of her series called Dance Queen's House—that ran from 3 to 21 November 2020. The record was initially supposed to be an extended play (EP) released on 20 November 2020.

Inna's 19 November 2020 vlog featured Romanian singer Antonia, which prompted InfoMusic writer Raluca Chirilă to speculate that Heartbreaker included a collaboration between Inna and the singer. On the same occasion, Inna confirmed that the project had been expanded to a studio album and postponed to 27 November, with over 50 songs having been created to choose from. A Zoom party was held during Inna's vlog on 21 November 2020 for fans to listen to demo versions of the chosen songs for the album; the tracks went on to be finished as well as mixed and mastered the following week.

"Madja Jadja", a demo of what later became "Maza Jaja", was uploaded to SoundCloud on 22 November 2020. Inna revealed the album's final title, Heartbreaker, and a preliminary tracklist through Instagram posts on 27 November. On the same date, the album was issued for streaming to YouTube and SoundCloud, with its release to fellow platforms and for digital download following on 4 December 2020. Global Records handled the release process, and additionally issued all 10 songs on Heartbreaker as promotional singles on 4 December.

== Critical reception and composition ==
Bradley Stern of MuuMuse called Inna a "solid supplier" and "damn prolific", praising her decision to issue a completely new body of work with Heartbreaker and not stretch it out by not adding the previously released non-album singles to its tracklist. Stern further applauded the album's release strategy as a "power move", and jokingly concluded: "[The album] came right after [Spotify's] #Wrapped2020 happened. I will be launching a Change.org petition to have Spotify recount the votes immediately." Running for approximatively 30 minutes, Heartbreaker consists of EDM, Middle Eastern and Latin-influenced dance-pop songs that are written in both English and Spanish. The album opens with the Arabic music and reggaeton-inspired "Maza Jaja" and "One Reason", with Stern commenting that the latter is "bound to be on heavy rotation at my Russian barbershop in Midtown that solely blasts deep house dance hits".

Dance-Charts' Manuel Probst commended Heartbreaker as "top notch" and singled out "Flashbacks" as his favorite track, noticing "atmospheric" sounds, a piano loop and slap bass in its composition. The "drama[tic]" song is followed by "Beautiful Life", which Stern compared to material released by Danish singer Medina. The Spanish-language "label brag" "Gucci Balenciaga" includes the explicit lyrics "me importa una mierda" (Spanish: "I don't give a shit"), and is followed by the title "Heartbreaker", which InfoMusic's Alex Stănescu picked as the album's highlight, noticing its oriental influences as well as the use of a synthesizer and vocal chopping. While Stern likened "Sunset Dinner" to American recording artist Britney Spears' "Change Your Mind (No Seas Cortes)" off her 2016 studio album Glory, he praised "Thicky" as "stand[ing] out above the rest". Seeing it as a "hypnotic dance floor anthem" and "a spiritual successor" to American singer Dev's "In the Dark" (2011), the writer noted "award-worthy lyricism that would make someone like Nadia Oh proud", including lines such as "He likes the kitty, I dog with it" and "Go down, stay there... don't move..."

== Promotion and singles ==
On 20 January 2021, "Flashbacks" was serviced to Romanian radio stations as the lead single of Heartbreaker; the song was also aided by a music video released that month. Upon entering the Shazam chart in Russia, "Flashbacks" experienced commercial success on the radio ranking in the region, as well as in those of Romania, Bulgaria, Ukraine and the Commonwealth of Independent States, peaking at numbers one, four, seven, nine and two, respectively. After performing "Maza Jaja" live on Selly Show, the Artist Awards and Untold Festival in December 2020, Inna released a marginally remastered version of the song—titled "Maza"—as the album's second single on 11 June 2021 alongside a music video. Other renditions of "Maza" include French lines from Black M and the contribution of Thutmose, respectively.

== Track listing ==
All tracks lyrics written by Elena Alexandra Apostoleanu (Inna) and Luisa Luca whereas musical composition was done by producers Alexandru Cotoi, Sebastian Barac, Marcel Botezan and David Ciente. Additionally, Nicole Ariana provided additional lyrics "You and I" and "Thicky", while Andrés Alcaraz provided additional lyrics on "Gucci Balenciaga".

Heartbreaker track listing (Note: The tracks are arranged differently on YouTube and SoundCloud.)
No.	Title	Length
1.	"Maza Jaja"	3:20
2.	"One Reason"	3:08
3.	"Flashbacks"	2:57
4.	"Beautiful Lie"	3:00
5.	"Gucci Balenciaga"	2:50
6.	"Heartbreaker"	3:00
7.	"Sunset Dinner"	2:52
8.	"You and I"	2:46
9.	"Thicky"	3:04
10.	"Till Forever"	3:10
Total length:		30:12

== Release history ==
Release history for Heartbreaker
Region	Date	Format	Label	Ref.
Various	27 November 2020	Streaming	Global	
Various	4 December 2020	Digital download	Global	
