= Te Vas =

2019 song by Inna

Single by Inna

from the album Yo
- Language: Spanish
- English title: "You Go" / "You Leave"
- Released: 31 May 2019
- Genre: House
- Length: 2:51
- Label: Global
- Songwriters: Elena Alexandra Apostoleanu; Cristina Maria Chiluiza
- Producers: Sebastian Barac; Marcel Botezan; David Ciente; Alexandru Cotoi

Inna singles chronology
| "Tu Manera" (2019) | "Te Vas" (2019) | "Bebe" (2019) |

"Te Vas" (English: "You Go" or "You Leave") is a song by Romanian singer Inna, digitally released on 31 May 2019 by Global Records as the fifth single from her sixth studio album Yo (2019). It was written by Inna and Cristina Maria Chiluiza, while production was handled by Sebastian Barac, Marcel Botezan, David Ciente and Alexandru Cotoi. A Spanish-language house song reminiscent of Inna's past material, the track lyrically discusses the bond between two separated lovers.

An accompanying music video for "Te Vas" was uploaded onto Inna's YouTube channel on 30 May 2019. Directed by Bogdan Păun, it features the singer and Dragoș Istvan performing a mixture of contemporary dance and acrobatics, representing an on-and-off relationship. For further promotion, Inna performed "Te Vas" for Romanian radio station Kiss FM in June 2019. The track peaked at number 36 on Romania's Airplay 100 chart. It was included in a The Baker and the Beauty episode.

== Background and composition ==
"Te Vas" was written by Inna along with Cristina Maria Chiluiza, while production was handled by Sebastian Barac, Marcel Botezan, David Ciente and Alexandru Cotoi. Ciente also engineered it, and Cotoi was hired for the mixing and mastering process. "Te Vas" was digitally released in Romania as the fifth single from Yo on 31 May 2019 by Global Records.

Musically, it is a Spanish language house track reminiscent of Inna's past works, featuring her singing in a "strong" tone during the verses alongside a "softer and more groovy" chorus. Written from the perspective of a "woman who was left behind", the lyrics delve on "a love that is irreplaceable and even if the other person walks away, they'll return someday". Trey Gaskin of L'Officiel saw "Te Vas" as "a different look at the separation anxiety often experienced by separated lovers" and called it a "defiant declaration of dedication and love, paired with a dancefloor-friendly beat".

== Music video ==
An accompanying music video for "Te Vas" was uploaded to Inna's official YouTube channel on 30 May 2019, preceded by a teaser four days prior. The video was directed by Bogdan Păun of NGM Creative, while Alex Mureșan was hired as the director of photography and Loops Production as the producers, respectively. Inna had previously filmed another visual for the song, yet felt it failed to "match with what she felt and with the [Yo]'s vibe", deciding to scrap it. Choreography for the video, consisting of contemporary dance and acrobatics, was done by Dragoș Istvan. He also appears in the clip as a dancer alongside Inna, with the two having practiced for a few days in a dance studio and at the shooting location.

During the "vibrant" video, they "intertwine in a back-and-forth dance routine, highlighting a relationship that is on-and-off". According to L'Officiel, Inna is "in a vulnerable tense dance battle with [Istvan]" in "an abandoned gymnasium" in the music video. Inna wears a black bralette and matching skirt, alongside a "wet-look" bob. Jonathan Currinn of CelebMix praised the video and its connection to the song's lyrics, likening the choreography to the one performed in Justin Bieber's "Love Yourself" (2015). He further wrote: "We always believed dancing and choreography wasn't a strong suit of Inna, hence why she never really included it in her previous visuals, however, we were clearly wrong as she completely nails every single step with her male partner, showcasing a fully-fleshed-out storyline from start to finish". A vertical video was released on 31 July 2019.

== Track listing ==
- Digital download
1. "Te Vas" – 2:51

== Charts ==
| Chart (2019) | Peak position |
|---|---|
| Romania (Airplay 100) | 36 |

== Release history ==
| Country | Date | Format(s) | Label | Ref. |
|---|---|---|---|---|
| Romania | 31 May 2019 | Digital download | Global | |
