= Diana V =

Romanian singer and songwriter

- Born: Diana Alexandra Olteanu; 15 April 2000 (age 26); Bucharest, Romania
- Occupations: Singer; songwriter
- Years active: 2020–present
- Label: Global

Diana Alexandra Olteanu (born on 15 April 2000), known professionally as Diana V, is a Romanian singer and songwriter signed by Global Records. In February 2020, she was announced as one of the three artists shortlisted to represent Romania at the Eurovision Song Contest 2020 as part of the label's collaboration with broadcaster Romanian Television (TVR). (Note: The Eurovision Song Contest 2020 was eventually cancelled due to the COVID-19 pandemic.) Her debut single, "Bad Girls Get Lonely Too", was released later that month and reached number 67 on the local Airplay 100 chart.

== Early life and career ==
Born on 15 April 2000 in Bucharest, Diana V showed a special interest in music from an early age and also auditioned for her local church choir at the age of four. In 2020, she signed a record deal with Romanian label Global Records. In the February of that year, it was reported that Diana V was one of three artists shortlisted to represent Romania at the Eurovision Song Contest 2020; broadcaster Romanian Television (TVR) had collaborated with Global Records for the selection. Roxen was however ultimately chosen. "Bad Girls Get Lonely Too", Diana V's debut single composed alongside David Ciente, was released on 13 February 2020 and eventually licensed in various countries, including Greece and Cyprus. It soon after received radio airplay in Romania, and peaked at number 67 on the local Airplay 100 chart. On 23 July 2021, Diana V issued her debut extended play (EP) Chaos, featuring six tracks co-written by her alongside their producer Ciente.

== Personal life and artistry ==
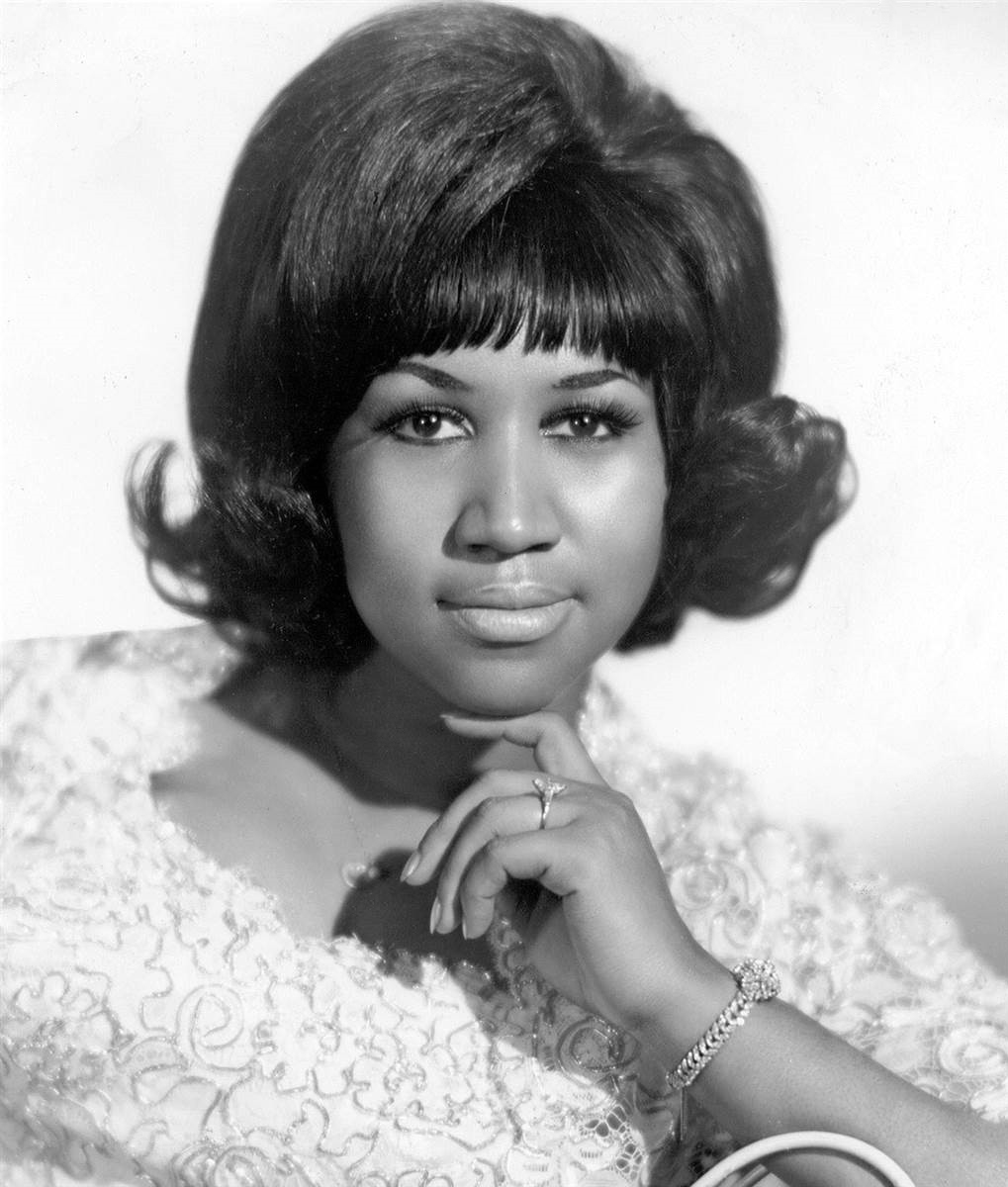
Diana V cites Aretha Franklin (pictured in 1968) as a musical influence.

Diana V is passionate about literature. During her childhood, she used to listen to gospel artists such as Aretha Franklin, who eventually influenced her music style. In a Unsitedemuzică.ro interview, the singer cited Beyoncé's "Run the World (Girls)" (2011) as a song that "defines" herself. A Uniunea Producătorilor de Fonograme din România editor praised Diana V's "unique" voice tone and vocal power, as well as her songwriting skills in an article.

== Discography ==
=== Extended plays ===
Title	Details
Chaos	Released: 23 July 2021; Label: Vision; Format: Digital download, streaming

=== Singles ===
Title	Year	Peak chart positions	Album
Title	Year	ROM	Album
"Bad Girls Get Lonely Too"	2020	67	Non-album singles
"Gotham" (with David Ciente)	2020	—	Non-album singles
"—" denotes a release that did not chart or was not released in that territory.

=== Music videos ===
Title (Note: Solely lists official music videos.)	Year	Director(s)
"Bad Girls Get Lonely Too"	2020	Șerban Racovițeanu
