= Yo (Inna album) =

2019 album by Inna

Studio album by Inna
- Released: 31 May 2019
- Length: 32:41
- Language: Spanish
- Label: Global; Roc Nation
- Producer: Sebastian Barac; Marcel Botezan; David Ciente; Alexandru Cotoi

Inna chronology
Nirvana (2017)	Yo (2019)	Heartbreaker (2020)

Singles from Yo
- 1. "Ra" Released: 27 September 2018; 2. "Iguana" Released: November 2018 (Note: While "Iguana" was digitally released on 30 November 2018, it had already been made available for radio airplay and streaming earlier that month.); 3. "Sin Ti" Released: 18 January 2019; 4. "Tu Manera" Released: 1 March 2019; 5. "Te Vas" Released: 31 May 2019

Yo (English: "I" or "Me") is the sixth studio album by Romanian singer Inna, released on 31 May 2019 by Global Records and Roc Nation. Inna began work on the record in 2016; inspired by a recent trip to Latin America, she decided the album would feature only Spanish language material. Inna contributed significantly to the songwriting process of Yo, and collaborated extensively with Romanian producer David Ciente on its songs. An experimental and heavily gypsy music-influenced effort, Yo marks the first time Inna took control over an album's creative process; it acts as a departure from her past EDM releases. Lyrically, Inna sings about love, and presents several female characters seen from different perspectives throughout the album.

Upon its release, music critics received Yo with positive reviews, commending its experimental nature and the resulting expansion of Inna's artistry. To promote the album, five singles were released from September 2018 to May 2019—"Ra", "Iguana", "Sin Ti", "Tu Manera" and "Te Vas". Of these, "Iguana" experienced commercial success in Romania, peaking at number four on the country's Airplay 100 chart. In addition, Inna made several public appearances in the United States and Mexico to promote "Ra", such as the 2018 Telehit Awards and 19th Annual Latin Grammy Awards, alongside promotion through Inna's inclusion in magazines such as Rolling Stone and Vogue México y Latinoamérica. A music video directed by Bogdan Păun was filmed for each of the album's tracks, which feature the singer embodying different women as part of independent storylines.

== Background and release ==
Inna began working on Yo in 2016, and around 50 songs were composed from which to select the album's final tracklist. After her first official tour in Canada and the United States in September–October 2018, Inna uploaded a short film on her YouTube channel on 16 October—her birthday—titled "Yo". In it, she teased the album by briefly elaborating on its creation. In an interview, Inna revealed the release date for Yo to be late 2018, saying that she was working on adjustments. Inna also signed a record deal with Roc Nation. The singer subsequently announced the record's release date as 31 May 2019, which would be conducted by Global Records and Roc Nation. She further unveiled its cover artwork on her Instagram. Created by Robert Obert, it shows the singer nude with a "freshly chopped" fringe bob in front of a floral collage and handwritten lyrics of some of the songs from Yo. On the day of release, Inna also launched the website yosoyinna.com to accompany the album's release and organized a release party in Bucharest, inviting fellow Romanian celebrities.

== Creation and composition ==
Inna envisioned Yo to be completely in Spanish, a language she had learned by watching telenovelas, due to the "vibe" that she had gotten during a recent trip to Latin America. She remembers: "I was in the studio, [...] listening to some instrumentals [...], I started with some lines and then, it turned out really easy to write the lyrics in Spanish". She further stated: "I never had a plan for it, we tried it in English but the music did not work that well." The singer took entire creative control over the album, which is why she chose the title Yo, referring only to herself, and contributed significantly to the songwriting. She elaborated on the songwriting process: "We write in gibberish, it could be any language. The base of the song is la-la-las or words with no meaning. Then we find the right words later."

Inna described the songs on Yo as experimental and heavily influenced by gypsy music, a change in style from her previous EDM releases. She saw her change in direction to an "eclectic" and "unclassifiable" genre as an "artistic necessity that assaulted her in the studio". Throughout the album, she also explores several singing styles, including vocal inflections influenced by Romanian folklore. The lyrics are written from the perspectives of several female characters. Each song delves into experiences Inna "thinks she has lived in another life". For Yo, Inna collaborated extensively with Romanian producer David Ciente, who added natural and homemade sounds to the songs' instrumentation; according to Inna, he "has made [music] out of everything from wood, metal, traffic sounds [and] a beat on the microphone".

"Gitana"
A 20-second sample of the flamenco and electronic "Gitana", an example for musical experimentation on Yo.

Valentin Mafroy of the music website Aficia views Yo as a concept album. Various publications reported that the majority of its songs delved into the theme of love and empowerment. Some tracks address other themes such as "Sí, Mamá" regarding Inna's mother's advice about fame and false friends, as well as the optimistic "La Vida" which talks about karma, and "Locura", delving on liberty in a relationship. Yo shows Inna's songwriting in a variety of genres, including house ("Te Vas"), and dance and pop ("Tu Manera"). Several songs use traditional Spanish genres or mix them with mainstream ones, such as "Iguana" (club and salsa), "Sin Ti" (dembow), and "Gitana" (flamenco and electronic music). "Contigo" samples Inna's "Nirvana" (2017), and the closing "Fuego" features the singer rapping throughout.

== Critical reception ==
Music critics received Yo with positive reviews, with Paloma Díaz Espiñeira of Los 40 praising the album's experimental and "risky" nature, citing "Tu Manera" and "Gitana" as highlights. The staff of Cosmopolitan saw "Iguana" as the best song on the album, but said that all of its tracks had a "unique melody", "the Inna touch", and were "impossible to listen to without dancing". CelebMix's Jonathan Currinn echoed the sentiment, although criticizing the order of the songs on the tracklist. He wrote: "[Yo] is another brilliant collection of tracks [...]. [Inna's] new direction, for this era, suits her well and adds to her international star quality".

== Promotion and singles ==
Inna embodies several female characters in the music videos for Yo. As an example, she portrays Luz, "the dreamy, very feminine, romantic, fights for love and her feelings", as well as the gypsy Zoe, "the youngest and craziest", in the visuals for "Fuego" and "Gitana", respectively (from left to right).

Eleven videos—one for each of the song on Yo—were directed by Bogdan Păun, while production was handled by Loops Production; Alexandru Mureșan was hired as the director of photography. Of the music videos, ten of the eleven had to be shot in seven days due to scheduling conflicts. Each of the clips have independent storylines, with Inna embodying different female characters and wearing clothes from brands such as Dolce & Gabbana and Gucci. Overall, she adopts a different look compared to her past video material. A vertical video was shot for "Contigo" as opposed to the conventional horizontal style.

The album's tracks "Iguana", "La Vida", "Locura" and "Sí, Mamá" were released as promotional singles in Romania in July 2018. For a Coca-Cola campaign, Coca-Cola Zero Sugar bottles were designed with QR codes that—when scanned with a smartphone—linked to Shazam, allowing users to stream the songs. "Contigo", "Fuego" and "Gitana" were also issued as promotional singles in May 2019, and "Ra" was released as the album's lead single on 27 September 2018 by Global Records in Romania. Inna visited Mexico and the United States to promote "Ra", attending the 2018 Telehit Awards and 19th Annual Latin Grammy Awards. In addition, she also appeared in magazines such as Rolling Stone and Vogue México y Latinoamérica. Roc Nation eventually issued "Ra" internationally on 2 November 2018.

Similarly, the labels also released the follow-ups "Iguana", "Sin Ti", "Tu Manera" and "Te Vas" in November 2018, January 2019, March 2019, and May 2019, respectively. "Iguana" experienced commercial success in Romania, reaching number four on the country's Airplay 100 chart, and "Tu Manera" was included on the soundtrack of the American television series Grand Hotel. Inna's previous two 2018 releases, "Me Gusta" and "No Help", were left out from Yo's tracklist as the singer thought they were not sonically fitting with the album's "vibe".

== Track listing ==
Credits adapted from the liner notes of Yo.

Yo – Standard version
No.	Title	Writer(s)	Producer(s)	Length
1.	"Ra"	Elena Alexandra Apostoleanu; Cristina Maria Chiluiza	Sebastian Barac; Marcel Botezan; David Ciente	2:55
2.	"Te Vas"	Apostoleanu; Chiluiza	Barac; Botezan; Ciente; Alexandru Cotoi	3:12
3.	"Iguana"	Apostoleanu; Chiluiza	Ciente	2:41
4.	"La Vida"	Apostoleanu; Chiluiza	Ciente	2:37
5.	"Locura"	Apostoleanu; Chiluiza	Ciente	3:27
6.	"Sí, Mamá"	Apostoleanu; Chiluiza	Ciente	2:48
7.	"Sin Ti"	Apostoleanu; Chiluiza	Ciente	2:48
8.	"Tu Manera"	Apostoleanu; Chiluiza	Ciente	2:45
9.	"Gitana"	Apostoleanu; Chiluiza	Ciente	3:01
10.	"Contigo"	Apostoleanu; Chiluiza	Ciente	2:57
11.	"Fuego"	Apostoleanu; Chiluiza	Ciente	3:15
Total length:				32:41

== Release history ==
Region	Date	Format	Label
Romania	31 May 2019	Digital download	Global
Worldwide	31 May 2019	Digital download	Roc Nation
Romania	2019	CD	Global; Roc Nation
