= Not My Baby =

2020 song by Inna

Single by Inna
- Released: 3 April 2020
- Genre: Dance-pop; deep house; EDM; Europop
- Length: 2:48
- Label: Global
- Composers: Lara Andersson; Elena Alexandra Apostoleanu; Michelle Buzz; Junior Oliver Frid; Fridolin Walcher
- Producer: Freedo

Inna singles chronology
"Bebe" (2019)	"Not My Baby" (2020)	"VKTM" (2020)

Music video
- "Not My Baby" on YouTube

Alternative cover
- Cover artwork used in Italy.

"Not My Baby" is a song by Romanian singer Inna, released for digital download as a single by Global Records on 3 April 2020. It was composed by Inna alongside Lara Andersson, Michelle Buzz, Junior Oliver Frid, and Fridolin Walcher, while the latter received credit as a producer under his stage name of Freedo. The song was noted as being a hi-NRG-inspired dance-pop, deep house, EDM and Europop track, as well as a departure from the experimental and gypsy music-influenced sound of Inna's Spanish studio album, Yo. Inna had already retransitioned to a more electronic production before the song with "Bebe" in 2019. The lyrics of the former delve into a toxic relationship with a selfish and untruthful partner.

Music critics received "Not My Baby" with universal acclaim upon release, commending its sound, catchiness, and Inna's vocal delivery. For promotional purposes, an animated lyric video for the song was uploaded to the singer's YouTube channel on 2 April 2020, depicting her in different settings. The official music video was subsequently released on 24 April of that year, including Inna with a snake on her arm and holding a red apple in her hand in the biblical Garden of Eden as an allusion to the Christian belief of the original sin. A reviewer further pointed out similarities between the visual and the Snow White fairy tale. Commercially, the song peaked at number 33 on the Romanian Airplay 100 chart. Inna performed the song at the Untold OverNight event in May 2020.

== Background and composition ==
For the creation of "Not My Baby", Inna enlisted a new team, with her contributing to the lyrics and composition alongside Lara Andersson, Michelle Buzz, Junior Oliver Frid, and Fridolin Walcher; the latter solely produced the song under his stage name of Freedo. Global Records released "Not My Baby" for digital download as a single in various countries on 3 April 2020. An English language track, it stylisically marks a comeback to the sound of Inna's early-career releases and a departure from the Spanish experimental and gypsy music-influenced material on her sixth studio album, Yo (2019). Critical commentary noted "Not My Baby" to be a hi-NRG-inspireddance-pop, deep house, EDM and Europop song.

Lyrically, the song touches on a past toxic relationship, in which the partner was attractive but selfish and untruthful. Lyrics from the verses include "It's not the way it was before, his touch was heaven" and "But every rose, it has its thorn", with Inna singing "He's not my baby, my baby, my baby now / He's not my baby, my baby wouldn't let me down" at the beginning of the refrain. Her voice is aided by a synthesized vocoder layer, and the production further makes use of a "melancholic" occasional piano.

== Reception ==
Upon release, "Not My Baby" was met with universal acclaim from music critics. While Idolator's Mike Wass concluded that the song was an "instantly endearing banger" that could attain commercial success, CelebMix's Jonathan Currinn called it one of Inna's best releases in recent memory by April 2020. Also noting the high remix potential, the latter reviewer pointed out that while Inna had taken musical inspiration from her older releases, the deep house elements in the track were nonetheless an unexplored field for her. Aficia writer Valentin Mafroy saw "Not My Baby" as "modern" and effective, furthermore jokingly stating that the song lyrically contradicted its predecessor, "Bebe" (2019), where Inna sang about holding on to her partner.

InfoMusic's Alex Stănescu commended the complementary use of vocoder on Inna's vocals, and called the former "perfect" for driving, "for dancing in front of the mirror, or... for obsessively cleaning the house during this period of self-isolation". Leon Krusch of Dance Charts similarly praised the singer's vocal delivery, which he claimed gave the song its originality. Krusch concluded that the song was sonically different from "Bebe" although both use electronic elements in their production. Commercially, "Not My Baby" reached number 33 on Romania's Airplay 100 chart on 21 June 2020. It initially debuted at number 95, on which MuuMuse's Bradley Stern commented, writing that "[s]hockingly, even Romania gets it wrong sometimes".

== Music videos ==
A screenshot from the music video, depicting Inna in the biblical Garden of Eden as an allusion to the original sin.

An animated lyric video for "Not My Baby" was created by Mihai Sighinaș and uploaded to Inna's YouTube channel on 2 April 2020. It depicts the latter in different settings, most notably surrounded by jungle leaves and a snake, while being seen from underneath her chin. The official music video, directed by Bogdan Păun, was ultimately released on 24 April. Alexandru Mureșan was hired as the director of photography, and Loops Production was hired for the production. According to reviewers, the clip alludes to the Christian belief of the original sin and to the Snow White fairy tale.

The visual commences with Inna wearing a pink latex bra and ripped jeans as she sits on a rack of plastic chairs in front of a computer-generated ocean background. Subsequently, the singer is depicted in the biblical Garden of Eden while she sports a black-and-white dress. Performing subtle hand movements, Inna holds a red apple in her hand, and her arm is eventually crawled on by a snake. As the video ends, the snake slithers away. Interspersed scenes show the singer wearing a leopard-print bra and a Norma Kamali swimsuit, alongside knee-high boots. Currinn called Inna "fierce, sexy, and seductive" within the music video, further praising her fashion. He also considered the last scene to be representative of leaving a toxic lover.

== Charts ==
Chart performance for "Not My Baby"
Chart (2020)	Peak position
Romania (Airplay 100)	33
Romania (Romanian Radio Airplay)	16

== Release history ==
Release history and formats for "Not My Baby"
Country	Date	Format(s)	Label	Ref.
Various	3 April 2020	Digital download	Global	
Italy	15 May 2020	Digital download	CDF	
Italy	29 May 2020	Radio airplay	CDF	
