= Iguana (song) =

2018 song by Inna

Single by Inna

from the album Yo
- Released: November 2018
- Length: 2:41
- Label: Global; Roc Nation
- Songwriters: Elena Alexandra Apostoleanu; Cristina Maria Chiluiza
- Producer: David Ciente

Inna singles chronology
"Ra" (2018)	"Iguana" (2018)	"Sin Ti" (2019)

Audio sample
- "Iguana": file; help

"Iguana" is a song by Romanian singer Inna. It was digitally released on 30 November 2018 as the second single for her sixth studio album Yo (2019) by Global Records and Roc Nation, although having already been made available for streaming and airplay earlier that month. It was written by Inna and Cristina Maria Chiluiza, while production was solely handled by David Ciente. Musically, the uptempo track has been described as being club and salsa-influenced, extending Inna's change in direction introduced with "Ra" (2018). The song's lyrics are in Spanish and see Inna discussing jealousy and lovesickness.

Upon its release, "Iguana" was well-received by music critics, who pointed out its catchiness and praised Inna's emotional vocal delivery. An accompanying music video was premiered on Inna's YouTube channel simultaneously with the song's digital release and was directed by Bogdan Păun. During the clip, the singer is shown at a night fiesta in an intoxicated state—as speculated by a reviewer—fighting back for her alleged love interest, who resides with another woman at an outside bar. The song was further promoted by live performances in Romania and Mexico, and reached number four on Romania's Airplay 100 chart. "Iguana" was used for the 2020 Milan Fashion Week.

== Background and composition ==
"Iguana" was written by Inna and Cristina Maria Chiluiza, while production was solely handled by David Ciente; he also engineered the song, and Max Kissaru provided mixing and mastering. In July 2018, the song, alongside three fellow tracks from Inna's sixth studio album Yo (2019), were released as promotional singles in Romania; for a Coca-Cola campaign, Coca-Cola Zero Sugar bottles were designed with QR codes that—when scanned with a smartphone—linked to Shazam, allowing users to stream the songs. Originally, it was announced that "Iguana" would be released as Yo's second single on 16 November 2018, but plans were scrapped; nonetheless it was made available for streaming by Roc Nation and was sent to Romanian radio stations that same month. The digital release of "Iguana" followed on 30 November 2018 and was also conducted by Roc Nation (by Global Records in Romania), with listeners being able to pre-order the single.

Musically, "Iguana" is club and salsa-influenced, and a more uptempo track than its predecessor "Ra" (2018), but extends Inna's change in direction introduced with the latter. It starts "gentle and rhythmically whilst Inna goes in hard with her lyrics" until the refrain is reached; there, club beats are introduced and the singer powerfully repeats the line "Sigo bailando sin ti" ("I keep dancing without you"). During the song's Spanish language lyrics, Inna implies an empowerment message and sings about a jealous and lovesick woman, who ultimately learns to continue enjoying her life without her love interest. Billboard noted "deafening beats and introspective lyrics" during the track, and pointed out that although "'no reservations' seems to be [Inna's] mantra, [...] a velvety croon of desolation flows throughout the song."

== Reception ==
Upon its release, "Iguana" was met with positive reviews from music critics. The staff of Cancan magazine praised the song's dance nature and Inna's energetic attitude, while both Mike Wass of Idolator and CelebMix's Jonathan Currinn called the track catchy. The latter also noted Inna's "most passionate vocals to date, truly meaning every single word." Billboard included "Iguana" in their Best Music Picks Of the Week list for the week ending 30 November 2018, praising Inna's "flawless" Spanish pronunciation and viewing the song as a "daring and frisky tune." Commercially, "Iguana" debuted at number 91 on Romania's Airplay 100 chart for the week ending 24 November 2018, and rose 54 places to number 37 the next week, standing as the highest climber. It has since peaked at number four.

== Music video and promotion ==
Inna performing on a stage in the video. According to a reviewer, she is portrayed in an intoxicated state.

An accompanying music video for "Iguana" was originally announced to be released on 16 November 2018 by a teaser that has since been deleted. Another two previews were uploaded to Inna's YouTube channel on 26 and 29 November 2018, respectively, with the music video being ultimately released on 30 November 2018. It had already been broadcast by Romanian TV channels for several days beforehand. Produced by Loops Production, Bogdan Păun was the video's director and Alexandru Mureșan was hired as the director of photography; Andra Manea performed make-up, Sorin Stratulat did hair styling and RDStyling brought the outfits used. One scene in the music video shows product placement of a Coca-Cola Zero Sugar bottle.

During the music video, Inna is shown alongside another woman at a night fiesta in a crowd of "intermingling" and "enthusiastic" people. A critic described the place where the video was shot as a "Latin American village." Wearing a reversible sequined jacket—which reads the phrase "Rest in Peace" on its back—over floral underwear paired with trainers, the singer stumbles "hazily, possibly from a night out" and "probably drunk," encountering her "lost love" which resides with another woman at an outside bar. Inna walks towards them trying to "claim[...] ownership of her love," but is met with rejection and pulled away by her accompany; yet she continues to sing the song to them. Interspersed shots show her on a stage in front of Wilburn & Sons Wagon And Blacksmith Shop with a backup band, where she performs to the song and tosses her hair back and forth; Inna "does not let the incident ruin her night" as she repeatedly affirms that she will continue dancing, even if her love interest is not present. Other scenes show "Inna's point of view, establishing what she's seeing in her intoxicated state."

Billboard pointed out that Inna showed an "all-around bold attitude" during the music video. Europa FM called the clip a mixture of Spanish singers Nathy Peluso and Beatriz Luengo's works. For further promotion of "Iguana", the singer delivered a live performance of the track alongside performances of "Ra" and "Cola Song" (2014) at the 2018 Telehit Awards in Mexico City on 7 November 2018. Inna also appeared on Kiss FM to perform the single; Currinn of CelebMix spoke highly of her vocal performance, considering it superior to the studio track and writing that "she has literally managed to blow us away, [...] her vocal ability [is] definitely impressive and intricate, considering how technical this song is." In May 2019, Inna performed "Iguana" on Românii au talent. In October 2019, Sorana Darclee impersonated the singer and sang the track for Romanian reality talent show Te cunosc de undeva!.

== Credits and personnel ==
Credits adapted from YouTube.

- Inna – lead vocals, songwriter
- Cristina Maria Chiluiza – songwriter
- David Ciente – producer, engineer
- Max Kissaru – mixing and mastering

== Track listing ==
- Digital download
1. "Iguana" – 2:41

== Charts ==
=== Weekly charts ===
Chart (2018–2019)	Peak position
Romania (Airplay 100)	4
Romania Airplay (Media Forest)	10
Romania TV Airplay (Media Forest)	2

=== Year-end charts ===
Chart (2019)	Position
Romania (Airplay 100)	5

== Release history ==
Country	Date	Format(s)	Label	Ref(s)
Various	November 2018	Streaming; radio airplay	Global / Roc Nation	
Various	30 November 2018	Digital download	Global / Roc Nation	
