= Sin Ti (Inna song) =

2019 song by Inna

Single by Inna

from the album Yo
- Language: Spanish
- Released: 18 January 2019
- Length: 2:49
- Label: Global; Roc Nation
- Songwriters: Elena Alexandra Apostoleanu; Cristina Maria Chiluiza
- Producer: David Ciente

Inna singles chronology
"Iguana" (2018)	"Sin Ti" (2019)	"Tu Manera" (2019)

"Sin Ti" (English: "Without You") is a song by Romanian singer Inna, digitally released on 18 January 2019 by Global Records and Roc Nation as the third single from her sixth studio album Yo (2019). It was written by Inna and Cristina Maria Chiluiza, while production was handled by David Ciente. A Spanish language track, it discusses the theme of love and Inna's connection with her love interest. Musically, the song partially showcases the dembow genre, and has an instrumentation consisting of bass, strings, flamenco-tinged Spanish guitar and sampled vocals.

Upon its release, "Sin Ti" was met with positive reviews from music critics. They praised the song's lyrics and instrumentation, as well as Inna's vocal delivery, while one likened it to her track "Ra" (2018), which set off her change in direction. An accompanying music video for "Sin Ti" was uploaded to Inna's YouTube channel simultaneously with the single's digital release. Directed by Bogdan Păun, the visual features the singer barefoot on a chair in a field. "Sin Ti" was used in Elite.

== Background and composition ==
"Sin Ti" was made available for digital download on 18 January 2019 by Global Records in Romania, and through Roc Nation elsewhere. It was written by Inna and Cristina Maria Chiluiza, while David Ciente was credited for the production; Max Kissaru handled the mixing and mastering process. Musically, "Sin Ti" is a slowed-down Spanish language song. Its Latin-influenced instrumentation features "heavy" bass, "fleeting" strings and a flamenco-tinged Spanish guitar in the chorus. While elements from the dembow genre are presented in the track's verses, its chorus features "bits of sampled vocals [...] winking in and out of earshot". According to Jonathan Currinn of CelebMix, "Sin Ti" is about "meeting someone who you haven’t met before but who you feel like you know instantly as if you knew them from a past life". Libertatea called it "a sincere love song and a direct and moving declaration", while Jon Pareles of The New York Times thought the track was about "sudden infatuation". Whispering throughout, Inna "pepper[s] her love [interest] with questions that demand an answer" in the refrain.

== Critical reception ==
Upon its release, "Sin Ti" received positive reviews from music critics. Currinn likened "Sin Ti" to Inna's "Ra" (2018), viewing it as continuing her change in direction, while also reflecting elements of the singer's previous dance material. He praised the song's lyrics, as well as Inna's emotional delivery and versatility. Refinery29's Courtney Smith wrote that the singer "creat[ed] a sense of space and longing with sparsity [...] [b]ut the intentionality in her delivery on the chorus is what makes the song sing". Pareles, writing for The New York Times, praised the "catchy, extremely canny production [...] that hops all over the Latin map"; he concluded his review by writing: "In a small world, [Inna]'s up-to-the-minute". Romania Insider picked "Sin Ti" as their "Romanian song of the day".

== Music video ==
An accompanying music video for "Sin Ti" was uploaded to Inna's official YouTube channel on 18 January 2019, preceded by a teaser released the day before. It was directed by Bogdan Păun of NGM Creative, while Alex Mureșan was hired as the director of photography and Loops Production as the producers. RDStyling provided Inna's outfit, and Sorin Stratulat and Andra Manea were credited for her hair styling and make-up, respectively. In the video, a barefoot Inna is seen sitting backwards on a "retro" chair in a field, wearing a fedora hat alongside an "off-the-shoulder" black-and-white dress which has a middle-split. Currinn labelled the clip as "back to basics" and likened it to the singer's visuals for "Rendez Vous" (2016) and "Ra". He further wrote: "This country-style fashion looks stunning on Inna, proving that she can look sexy in anything and truly work her look".

== Credits and personnel ==
Credits adapted from YouTube.

- Inna – lead vocals, songwriter
- Cristina Maria Chiluiza – songwriter
- David Ciente – producer
- Max Kissaru – mixing and mastering

== Track listing ==
- Digital download
1. "Sin Ti" – 2:49

== Release history ==
Country	Date	Format(s)	Label	Ref.
Romania	18 January 2019	Digital download	Global	
Various	18 January 2019	Digital download	Roc Nation	
