= David Ciente =

Romanian composer and producer

- Born: 9 July 1989 (age 37); Oradea, Romania
- Education: National University of Music Bucharest
- Occupations: Composer; producer
- Musical career
- Label: Track Shack Records
- Website: davidciente.com

David Ciente (born 9 July 1989) is a Romanian composer and producer. In 2012 and 2013, he attempted to represent Romania in the Eurovision Song Contest with his band Electric Fence, finishing in second place on both occasions. Having signed a record deal with native label Global Records, he is best known for collaborating with artists such as Andra, Inna, Selena Gomez, Alicia Keys and Adam Lambert.

== Early life ==
Born on 9 July 1989 in Oradea, Ciente discovered his musical passion and talent at a young age, taking classical piano lessons at the age of nine. He went on to study music and graduated from the National University of Music Bucharest. As a teenager, Ciente was the keyboard player in a local rock band, named Chrome, and later joined fellow local project Danger with which he had concerts in Romania and abroad. Upon leaving the group, Ciente revived Raza—later known as Electric Fence—with Elena Vasile. They submitted the entries "Șun-ta" and "Emilia" for the 2012 and 2013 Selecția Națională, an event organized to select Romania's Eurovision Song Contest entries for the respective years, finishing second on both occasions.

In the subsequent years, Ciente signed a record deal with Romanian label Global Records and established himself as a producer, notably having worked with Romanian singer Inna on all tracks included on her sixth and seventh studio albums Yo (2019) and Heartbreaker (2020). He further collaborated with native artists Lariss, Shift and Andra, as well as with Alicia Keys and Adam Lambert. In 2020, Ciente composed the song "Ring" featured on Selena Gomez's Rare.

== Production discography ==
Year	Title	Artist(s)	Album
2014	"Dale Papi"	Lariss	Non-album song
2015	"Bună, ce mai zici?"	Ruby featuring Dorian Popa	Non-album song
2015	"Avioane de hârtie"	Shift featuring Andra	Non-album song
2015	"Epana"	Lariss	Non-album song
2017	"Gimme Gimme"	Inna	Nirvana
2017	"Ruleta"	Inna	Nirvana
2017	"Nirvana"	Inna	Nirvana
2018	"Me Gusta"	Inna	Non-album song
2018	"La Vida"	Inna	Yo
2018	"Locura"	Inna	Yo
2018	"Sí, Mamá"	Inna	Yo
2018	"Iguana"	Inna	Yo
2018	"Ra"	Inna	Yo
2019	"Te Vas"	Inna	Yo
2019	"Sin Ti"	Inna	Yo
2019	"Tu Manera"	Inna	Yo
2019	"Gitana"	Inna	Yo
2019	"Contigo"	Inna	Yo
2019	"Fuego"	Inna	Yo
2020	"Ring" (Writing credits)	Selena Gomez	Rare
2020	"Bad Girls Get Lonely Too"	Diana V	Non-album song
2020	"Backpack"	TAG featuring Pitbull	Non-album song
2020	"Beautiful Lie"	Inna	Heartbreaker
2020	"Flashbacks"	Inna	Heartbreaker
2020	"Gucci Balenciaga"	Inna	Heartbreaker
2020	"Heartbreaker"	Inna	Heartbreaker
2020	"Maza Jaja"	Inna	Heartbreaker
2020	"One Reason"	Inna	Heartbreaker
2020	"Sunset Dinner"	Inna	Heartbreaker
2020	"Thicky"	Inna	Heartbreaker
2020	"Till Forever"	Inna	Heartbreaker
2020	"You and I"	Inna	Heartbreaker
