= No Help =

Single by Inna

from the album Nirvana (Deluxe edition)
- Released: 6 September 2018
- Genre: Dance; tropical house
- Length: 3:02
- Label: Global
- Composers: Zack Knight; Breyan Isaac; Tinashe Sibanda; Willie Tafa; Philip Kembo; Alexander Izquierdo; Khaled Rohaim
- Lyricists: Elena Alexandra Apostoleanu; Breyan Isaac

Inna singles chronology
"Pentru că" (2018)	"No Help" (2018)	"Ra" (2018)

Audio sample
- "No Help": file; help

Music video
- "No Help" on YouTube

"No Help" is a song by Romanian singer Inna, included on the deluxe edition of her fifth studio album Nirvana (2017). It was released for digital download and streaming on 6 September 2018 by Global Records. Musically, "No Help" is a pop and oriental-influenced dance and tropical house song, whose lyrics discuss confidence, independence and self-help. The track received positive reviews from music critics, who praised its catchiness and dance nature. For promotion, an accompanying music video was uploaded onto Inna's official YouTube channel simultaneously with the song's release. It was filmed by Bogdan Păun in Morocco and Los Angeles. Reviewers praised the outfits and landscapes featured in the visual. "No Help" received minor commercial success in Romania and France.

== Background and reception ==
Inna announced the release of a single on social media one day before distributing "No Help" digitally and for streaming on 6 September 2018 via Global Records. She had shortly before released her self-titled application for sale. In 2020, the SoundCloud deluxe edition of Inna's fifth studio album Nirvana (2017) included "No Help". Musically, "No Help" has been described as a pop-influenced dance and tropical house song, featuring Inna's "typical Eastern European house beats". Valentin Malfroy of website Aficia noted oriental influences in the song. Lyrically, Inna discusses confidence and independence, alluding to the concept of self-help. The text is in English and Spanish ("You're all on my body / Sé que quieres de mí, de mí, de mí / Baby, I'mma be honest / Estoy pensando en tí, en tí, en tí") also see Inna "[having] a Coca-Cola but [not wanting] no chaser".

Music critics gave positive reviews to "No Help" following its release. Jonathan Currinn of CelebMix called the song "beyond catchy", and compared it to material featured on Inna's fifth studio album Nirvana (2017). He especially found similarities in the album tracks "My Dreams" and "Lights". An editor of Star Gossip Magazine praised the track's dance nature, whilst Bradley Stern of MuuMuse called it an "effortlessly hot, sleek club thumper". Commercially, "No Help" debuted at number 73 on Romania's Airplay 100 chart for the week ending 23 September 2018, and ascended to its peak position at number 65 the next week. It also reached number 40 on the French Club 40 ranking.

== Music video ==
Shot of the music video, showing Inna laying over a couch in a desert, wearing white clothing. A reviewer found this "risque" outfit in particular to resemble the singer's past "provocative" work.

An accompanying music video for the song was uploaded onto Inna's official YouTube channel on 6 September 2018. It was shot in Morocco and Los Angeles by NGM Creative's Bogdan Păun, while Alexandru Mureșan was hired as the director of photography and Loops Production as the producers. Make-up was done by Anthony Merante and Anca Buldur, hair styling by Sorin Stratulat, and clothing was provided by RDStyling. During the music video, Inna wears multiple outfits while residing in a desert and a blue-toned forest. Currinn of CelebMix found that the "risque" white outfit resembled the singer's past "provocative" music videos. In the same scene, he likened her "puffed up" hair styling to "that old-school pin-up look from half a century ago or so".

Inna also wears a beige outfit along with a short-hair wig and cowboy boots. Currinn praised her hair styling, while Rodica Mițu of DC News called it "daring". Inna further sports a "binbag-style" trench coat, as well as a blue sequined jumper with long sleeves. Accompanying Inna in the music video are several extras who—according to Currinn—"set a slight narrative [...], suggesting that they don't quite have self-belief and they are searching for the help they need—one has some binoculars. By the end, they seemed to have gained confidence in themselves". The aforementioned editor praised the video for relating well to the song and commended the fact that Inna "really does look good in anything". Website Aficia's Valentin Malfroy stated that the clip mixes "breathtaking landscapes and fatal beauty".

== Track listing ==
- Digital download
1. "No Help" – 3:02

== Charts ==
Chart (2018)	Peak position
France (Club 40)	40
Romania (Airplay 100)	65

== Release history ==
Region	Date	Format	Label
Various	6 September 2018	Digital download	Global
Various	6 September 2018	Streaming	Global
Turkey	28 September 2018	Digital download	Yeni Dünya
Italy	2 November 2018	Radio airplay	CDF
