= Tu Manera =

2019 song by Inna

Single by Inna

from the album Yo
- Language: Spanish
- English title: "Your Way"
- Released: 1 March 2019
- Genre: Pop
- Length: 2:45
- Label: Roc Nation
- Songwriters: Elena Alexandra Apostoleanu; Cristina Maria Chiluiza
- Producer: David Ciente

Inna singles chronology
| "Sin Ti" (2019) | "Tu Manera" (2019) | "Te Vas" (2019) |

"Tu Manera" (English: "Your Way") is a song recorded by Romanian singer Inna, digitally released on 1 March 2019 by Roc Nation as the fourth single for her sixth studio album Yo (2019). It was written by Inna and Cristina Maria Chiluiza, while production was handled by David Ciente. "Tu Manera" is a Spanish-language dance, Latin and Caribbean-influenced pop song that represents Inna falling for someone through its lyrics. A music video for the song was released on 7 March 2019; directed by Bogdan Păun, it features the singer performing several activities in front of a house in a dusty landscape. Commercially, "Tu Manera" reached number 78 on Romania's Airplay 100 chart. It was included on the soundtrack of the American television series Grand Hotel, as well as used for Need for Speed Heat and an Apple Watch commercial.

== Background and composition ==
"Tu Manera" was written by Inna along with Cristina Maria Chiluiza, while production was handled by David Ciente. The latter also engineered it, and Sergiu Mustață was hired for its mixing and mastering process. "Tu Manera" was digitally released in various countries as the fourth single from Inna's sixth studio album Yo on 1 March 2019 by Roc Nation; Global Records issued it in Romania one week later on the same platform.

It is a Spanish language dance, Latin and Caribbean-influenced pop song, featuring "very sticky, funny and cheerful" lyrics about falling for someone. Elias Leight of Rolling Stone called "Tu Manera" a "cheerful" mixture of American singer Gwen Stefani's "Hollaback Girl" (2005), Peruvian band Novalima's "Machete" (2003) and material by Colombian band Bomba Estéreo. In an interview, Inna described the track as "one of the most commercial songs" from Yo, as well as "super repetitive [and] uptempo". She also said on its creation: "It started with a bass[line] that we fell in love with. We wanted to do something super simple, not so many melodies. Just the bass by itself sounds like a hit."

== Music video ==
An accompanying music video for "Tu Manera" was uploaded onto Inna's official YouTube channel on 7 March 2019. It was directed by Bogdan Păun of NGM Creative, while Alexandru Mureșan was hired for its filming process. In an interview, Inna reflected on the shooting: "I had lots of fun at the shooting [...] Actually, I did not feel like I was at a shooting. I did everything that went through my head, without limits, like when I was little." The video opens with a backwards-motion scene of the singer walking with a bicycle as people either put the set together or dismantle the set in the background. Throughout the rest of the clip, Inna proceeds into performing in front of a house in a dusty landscape, "dancing on the street, riding a bike and sitting on a red couch in a pickup truck", among other activities.

Her fashion, as described by CelebMix's Jonathan Currinn, is "laidback and simple", with her wearing a yellow T-shirt reading the word "Love", Uhlsport red running shorts and Balenciaga trainers. According to Currinn, the music video reflects Inna's "bright and fun" energy and personality previously hinted at in the visuals for "Un Momento" (2011), "Wow" (2012) and "Good Time" (2014). Libertatea echoed Currinn's thoughts. Shock noticed the contrast between the dusty landscape and Inna's appearance that had "a touch of sensuality, fantasy and charm". In addition to the music video, a vertical video was also released online on 16 April 2019. Shot in Miami, it shows Inna "flaunt[ing] her figure in a yellow long sleeve bodysuit, paired with sunglasses whilst her hair [is] combed back away from her face".

== Track listing ==
- Digital download
1. "Tu Manera" – 2:45

== Charts ==
| Chart (2019) | Peak position |
|---|---|
| Romania (Airplay 100) | 78 |

== Release history ==
| Territory | Date | Format(s) | Label |
|---|---|---|---|
| Various | 1 March 2019 | Digital download | Roc Nation |
| Romania | 8 March 2019 | Digital download | Global |
