= Minelli (singer) =

Romanian singer and songwriter (born 1988)

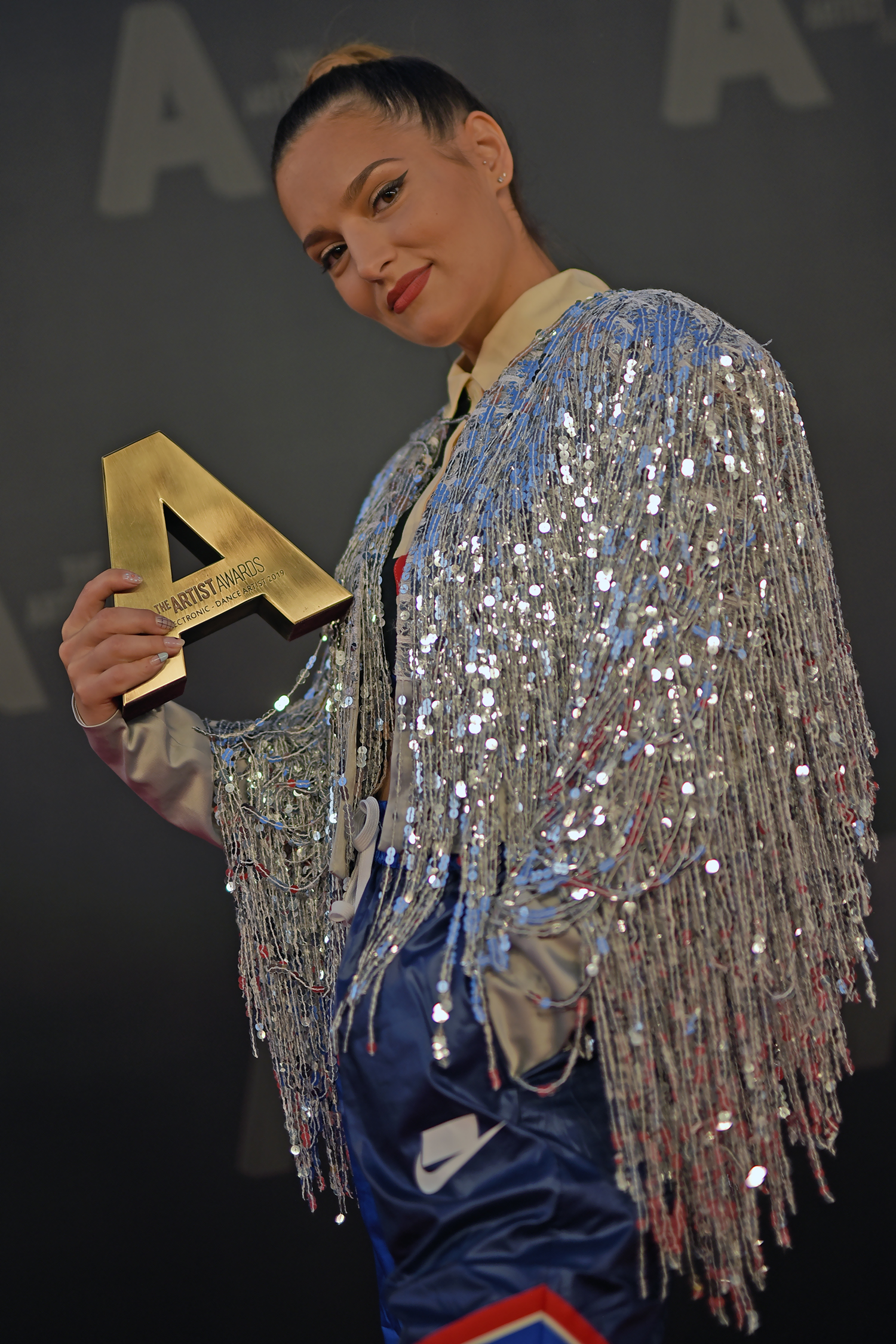
- Minelli at the Artist Awards 2019
- Born: Luisa Ionela Luca; 22 August 1988 (age 37); Slobozia, Romania
- Occupations: Singer; songwriter
- Years active: 2006–present
- Musical career
- Genres: Dance-pop, house
- Instrument: Vocals
- Label: Global
- Formerly of: Mojo; Wassabi

Luisa Ionela Luca (born 22 August 1988), known professionally as Minelli, is a Romanian singer and songwriter. Upon being part of the girl group Wassabi from 2006 to 2009, she rose to fame with her 2019 single "Mariola", which topped the Romanian Airplay 100 chart. Subsequently, in 2021, "Rampampam" became a hit in multiple territories.

== Life and career ==
Minelli was born as Luisa Ionela Luca on 22 August 1988, and began singing at the age of 11, when she formed a band in her hometown. In 2004, she moved to Bucharest, and between 2006 and 2009, she was a member of the band Wassabi. They attempted to represent Romania at the Eurovision Song Contest in 2007, submitting the songs "Crazy" with Morandi and "Do the Tango with Me" to that year's national final. After Wassabi disbanded, Minelli focused on her solo career and began working as a singer and songwriter.

In 2019, Minelli released her first number-one single in Romania, "Mariola", which topped the country's Airplay 100 ranking. 2021's "Rampampam" became a hit multiple regions such as Bulgaria, the Czech Republic, Hungary, the Commonwealth of Independent States (CIS), Lithuania and Poland. For the week ending 28 August 2021, "Rampampam" reached number 139 on the Billboard's Global Excl. U.S. As a songwriter, Minelli's repertoire includes songs such as "Inimi de ceară" (2017) performed by Andra, "Touch Me" (2019) by Antonia and "Flashbacks" (2021) by Inna.

== Personal life ==
Minelli met Lucian Luca in 2007 at a recording studio, and the two later married. In 2010, they became parents when Sarah Maria, their first child, was born. In 2017, Minelli gave birth to her second child, a boy named Filip.

== Discography ==
=== Extended plays ===
List of extended plays, with details
Title	Details
Nostalgic Illusions	Released: 25 November 2020; Label: Global Records; Format: Digital download, streaming

=== Singles ===
==== As lead artist ====
List of singles as lead artist, with selected chart positions and certifications
Title	Year	Peak chart positions												Certifications	Album
Title	Year	ROM Air.	BUL Air.	CIS Air.	CRO Int. Air.	CZR Air.	GER Dig.	HUN	LTU	POL Air.	RUS Air.	UKR Air.	WW Excl. US	Certifications	Album
"Și m-am îndrăgostit de tine" (as part of Wassabi)	2007	36	—	—	—	—	—	—	—	—	—	—	—		Non-album singles
"Hello Lonely Girl" (as part of Wassabi)	2008	74	—	—	—	—	—	—	—	—	—	—	—		Non-album singles
"Don't Go Baby" (as part of Wassabi)	2009	—	—	—	—	—	—	—	—	—	—	—	—		Non-album singles
"Dacă strig" (as part of Mojo)	2013	—	—	—	—	—	—	—	—	—	—	—	—		Non-album singles
"Empty Spaces"	2017	—	—	—	—	—	—	—	—	—	—	—	—		Non-album singles
"My Heart"	2017	—	—	—	—	—	—	—	—	—	—	—	—		Non-album singles
"Mariola"	2019	1	—	171	—	—	—	—	—	—	—	—	—		Non-album singles
"Loca" (featuring Erik Frank)	2020	—	—	—	—	—	—	—	—	—	—	—	—		Non-album singles
"Discoteka" (with Inna)	2020	62	—	—	—	—	—	—	—	—	—	—	—		Non-album singles
"Rampampam"	2021	2	1	1	4	1	77	1	1	2	1	2	139	SNEP: Gold; ZPAV: 3× Platinum	Non-album singles
"Nothing Hurts"	2021	10	8	3	35	—	—	—	2	10	4	70	—	ZPAV: Gold	Non-album singles
"MMM"	2022	—	—	9	15	69	—	1	62	1	13	3	—	ZPAV: Gold	Non-album singles
"Deep Sea" (with R3hab)	2022	—	—	11	—	65	—	—	— (Note: "Deep Sea" did not enter the AGATA Singlų Top 100, but peaked at No. 80 on the TopHit Lithuanian Airplay chart.)	—	5	14	—		Non-album singles
"Get Get Down" (with Crispie)	2022	—	—	—	—	—	—	—	—	—	—	—	—		Non-album singles
"Could Be Something"	2022	—	—	—	—	—	—	—	— (Note: "Could Be Something" did not enter the AGATA Singlų Top 100, but peaked at No. 91 on the TopHit Lithuanian Airplay chart.)	23	—	—	—		Non-album singles
"Peligrosa"	2023	—	—	—	—	—	—	—	—	—	—	—	—		Non-album singles
"Think About U" (with Sickotoy)	2023	—	—	—	—	51	—	—	—	—	—	—	—		Non-album singles
"No Tears"	2023	—	—	—	—	—	—	—	— (Note: "No Tears" did not enter the AGATA Singlų Top 100, but peaked at No. 10 on the TopHit Lithuanian Airplay chart.)	—	—	—	—		Non-album singles
"In Love" (with Inna)	2025	—	—	—	—	—	—	—	—	—	—	—	—		Non-album singles
"—" denotes a recording that did not chart or was not released in that territory.

==== As featured artist ====
List of singles as featured artist, with selected chart positions
Title	Year	Peak chart positions				Album
Title	Year	ROM Air.	CIS Air.	FRA	GER	Album
"Portilla de Bobo" (LoL Deejays vs. Minelli and Follow Your Instinct)	2013	—	—	52	—	Non-album singles
"Soare din nori" (Blitză featuring Minelli)	2013	—	—	—	—	Non-album singles
"Hump" (Arnold Palmer featuring Minelli)	2015	—	—	—	—	Non-album singles
"Murder the Dancefloor" (Emrah Is featuring Follow Your Instinct and Minelli)	2016	—	—	—	—	Non-album singles
"Love On Repeat" (Dave Ramone featuring Minelli)	2016	—	—	—	87	Non-album singles
"My Mind" (Vanotek featuring Minelli)	2016	—	—	—	—	Non-album singles
"În dormitor" (Vanotek featuring Minelli)	2016	58	—	—	—	Non-album singles
"Summer Love" (Dave Ramone featuring Minelli)	2017	—	—	—	—	Non-album singles
"No Sleep" (Vanotek featuring Minelli)	2017	—	—	—	—	Non-album singles
"Paradise" (PAX Paradise Auxiliary featuring Minelli)	2019	63	—	—	—	Non-album singles
"Addicted" (Sickotoy featuring Minelli)	2019	2	130	—	—	Non-album singles
"Done" (Pascal Junior featuring Minelli)	2020	—	—	—	—	Non-album singles
"I Did" (Sickotoy featuring Minelli)	2025	—	—	—	—	Non-album singles
"—" denotes a recording that did not chart or was not released in that territory.

==== Uncredited vocals ====
List of singles with uncredited vocals, with selected chart positions
Title	Year	Peak chart positions	Album
Title	Year	ROM Air.	Album
"Fire to My Heart" (Marco & Seba)	2019	58	Non-album singles
"Pa Mi" (Gran Error featuring Spania '99)	2019	64	Non-album singles
"Jacket" (PAX Paradise Auxiliary)	2019	—	Non-album singles
"Muzica e pentru toți" (Vanotek or Irina Rimes and Vanotek)	2019	—	Non-album singles
"Dum Dum" (Sickotoy and Ilkay Sencan)	2020	20	Non-album singles
"F..k That" (Bastard!)	2020	24	Non-album singles
"Scara 2, etajul 7" (Carla's Dreams)	2020	3	Non-album singles
"You Lose" (Bastard!)	2021	—	Non-album singles
"Shukar" (Gran Error)	2021	—	Non-album singles
"Miss You" (Gran Error)	2024	—	Non-album singles
"—" denotes a recording that did not chart or was not released in that territory.

==== Promotional singles ====
List of promotional singles
Title	Year	Peak chart positions			Album
Title	Year	CIS Air.	CRO Int. Air.	RUS Air.	Album
"21 Reasons" (as part of Wassabi featuring Matteo)	2006	—	—	—	Non-album singles
"Haos"	2018	—	—	—	Non-album singles
"Bo$$"	2019	—	—	—	Non-album singles
"Separated"	2020	—	—	—	Non-album singles
"Have Yourself a Merry Little Christmas"	2020	—	—	—	Non-album singles
"Hola!" (with Romanian House Mafia and Jade Shadi)	2021	—	—	—	Non-album singles
"Party" (with Inna and Romanian House Mafia)	2021	—	—	—	Non-album singles
"Heart Instructions"	2022	—	—	—	Non-album singles
"Confused"	2022	36	39	23	Non-album singles
"—" denotes a recording that did not chart or was not released in that territory.

==== Guest appearances ====
List of guest appearances
Title	Year	Album
"Reality & Dreams" (Morandi featuring Lisa)	2007	N3XT

== Songwriting credits ==
List of selected songwriting credits
Title	Year	Artist	Album
"Dame Dame"	2012	Mandinga	Club de Mandinga
"Sufletul zâmbea"	2012	Mandinga	Club de Mandinga
"Inima nu vrea"	2014	Horia Brenciu featuring Delia	None
"NaNaNa"	2017	Alina Eremia	360
"Dream About the Ocean"	2017	Inna	Nirvana
"Între noi nu mai e nimic"	2017	FreeStay featuring Andra	None
"Inimi de ceară"	2017	Andra	None
"Magique"	2017	Carine	None
"Come Around"	2017	Soundland and Timebelle	None
"Magical place"	2018	DJ Sava featuring Iova	None
"Nu mai e"	2018	Ioana Ignat	None
"Touch Me"	2019	Antonia	None
"Fuego"	2019	Maria Ilieva	None
"Jacket"	2019	PAX Paradise Auxiliary	None
"Take Me"	2019	Vanotek featuring Myata	None
"You Don't Love Me"	2019	Sickotoy featuring Roxen	None
"Hurricane"	2019	Alessiah	None
"Como ¡Ay!"	2020	Antonia	None
"Escape"	2020	Roxen	None
"Waiting For"	2020	Alessiah	None
"Touché"	2020	Sickotoy and Misha Miller	None
"Slow Dance"	2020	Gran Error	None
"Storm"	2020	Roxen	None
"Göz Göze"	2020	Alper Erözer	None
"Love Me"	2020	Alessiah	
"Maza Jaja"	2021	Inna	Heartbreaker
"Flashbacks"	2021	Inna	Heartbreaker
"One Reason"	2021	Inna	Heartbreaker
"Beautiful Lie"	2021	Inna	Heartbreaker
"Gucci Balenciaga"	2021	Inna	Heartbreaker
"Sunset Dinner"	2021	Inna	Heartbreaker
"You and I"	2021	Inna	Heartbreaker
"Thicky"	2021	Inna	Heartbreaker
"Till Forever"	2021	Inna	Heartbreaker
"Call 911"	2021	Sickotoy and Maruv	None
"Someone"	2021	Vanotek featuring Denitia	None
"Up"	2021	Inna with Sean Paul	None
"Lonely"	2022	Inna	Champagne Problems
"Love Bizarre"	2022	Inna	Champagne Problems
"Baby"	2022	Inna	Champagne Problems
"Fire & Ice"	2022	Inna	Champagne Problems
"Solo"	2022	Inna	Champagne Problems
"Cryo"	2022	Inna	Champagne Problems
"Millennium"	2022	Inna	Champagne Problems
"Kumera"	2022	Inna	Champagne Problems
"Don't Let Me Down"	2022	Inna	Champagne Problems
"Tattoo"	2022	Eva Timush	None
"Karnaval"	2024	Elvana Gjata	None

== See also ==
- List of music released by Romanian artists that has charted in major music markets
