= Bebe (Inna and Vinka song) =

2019 song by Inna and Vinka

Single by Inna and Vinka
- Released: 4 November 2019
- Genre: Pop
- Length: 2:53
- Label: Global
- Songwriter(s): Elena Alexandra Apostoleanu; Veronica Luggya; Theea Miculescu
- Producer(s): Sebastian Barac; Marcel Botezan

Inna singles chronology
"Te Vas" (2019)	"Bebe" (2019)	"Not My Baby" (2020)

Music video
- "Bebe" on YouTube

"Bebe" is a song by Romanian singer Inna and Ugandan recording artist Vinka, digitally released on 4 November 2019 by Global Records. It was written by the aforementioned artists alongside Theea Miculescu, while the production was handled by Sebastian Barac and Marcel Botezan. A French, Swahili, Luganda, and English love song, the track's genre has been described as Afro and dancehall-influenced pop. Music critics gave mixed reviews to the track, praising its catchiness but criticizing the track as sonically uninteresting.

An accompanying music video for "Bebe" was uploaded to Inna's YouTube channel simultaneously with the song's digital release. Directed by Bogdan Păun and filmed at the Bucharest Metro, the clip features Inna and Vinka residing in a graffiti-decorated train and walking the corridors of the subway. They wear various Gucci clothing pieces which were praised by critics. Commercially, the track experienced success in Romania, reaching number one on the country's Airplay 100 chart.

== Background and composition ==
"Bebe" was written by Inna, Vinka and Theea Miculescu, while the production was handled by Sebastian Barac and Marcel Botezan. It was released for digital download in various countries on 4 November 2019 by Global Records. A French, Swahili, Luganda, and English love song, "Bebe" was composed during a spontaneous studio session, leading to the creation of its concept, melodic line and refrain. Critical commentary noted the track as a "melancholic" Afro and dancehall-influenced pop song. Lyrics include: "Je suis folle d’amour avec toi / Mon cœur ne s’arrête pas".

== Reception ==
Upon its release, "Bebe" received mixed reviews from music critics. While Mandina Hervé of Radio France International called the song "terribly effective", CelebMix's Jonathan Currinn praised the singers' vocals, as well as the track's catchy and multilingual nature. In a negative review, an Aficia writer described "Bebe" as "relatively banal" and wrote that "the beat is dull. Almost boring", deeming only its title as interesting. OkayAfrica's Camille Storm included the track on her 20 Best East African Songs of 2019 list. Commercially, the track achieved success in Romania, initially peaking at number three on the country's Airplay 100 chart for three weeks as of 23 February 2020. On 15 March, "Bebe" topped the chart, becoming Inna's fourth number-one in the country.

== Music video ==
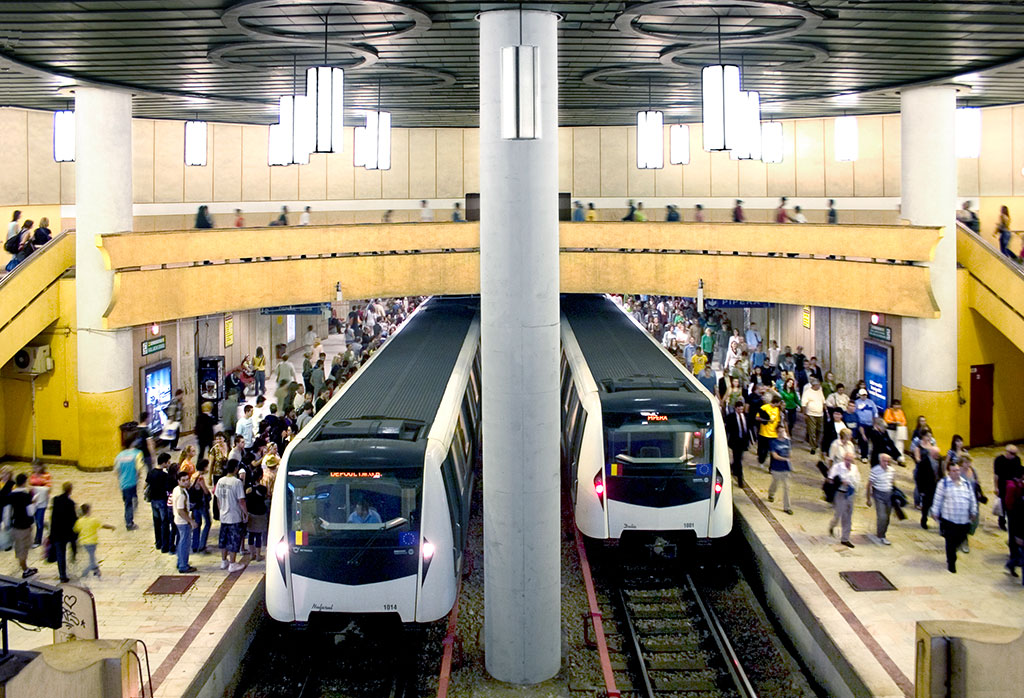
The music video was shot at the Bucharest Metro (pictured).

An accompanying music video for "Bebe" was uploaded to Inna's official YouTube channel on 4 November 2019. It was directed by Bogdan Păun, while Alexandru Mureșan acted as the director of photography. RDstyling was hired for the outfits used, while Andra Manea and Anca Buldur completed the make-up, and Adonis Enache and Ana Lăzărescu the hair styling. Product placement of Coca-Cola Zero Sugar is incorporated in one scene of the video.

Filmed at the Bucharest Metro, the video opens with a subway train driving past a restricted area and entering a tunnel. As the graffiti-decorated interior of the carriage is shown, it sees Inna and Vinka accompanied by several models. The singers wear Gucci clothing, with Inna sporting a nylon hood over a black bra and loose joggers, while the latter wears a long-length red jacket black shorts paired with striking jewelry and sunglasses. As the clip ends, black-and-white shots of them walking the corridors of the subway are shown. Upon its release, the music video was praised by critics. Currinn of CelebMix called the clip one of Inna's "most unforgettable music videos to date" and praised its energy, while InfoMusic's Alex Stănescu commended Inna's fashion as "Cleopatra meets Little Red Riding Hood". Elizabeth Musyimi, writing for The Star, further stated that Inna and Vinka express "their strong personalities through their outfits".

== Credits and personnel ==
Credits adapted from YouTube.

- Elena Alexandra Apostoleanu (Inna) – lead vocals, songwriter, music
- Veronica Luggya (Vinka) – lead vocals, songwriter, music
- Sebastian Barac – producer, music
- Marcel Botezan – producer, music
- Theea Miculescu – songwriter

== Track listing ==
- Digital download
1. "Bebe" – 2:53

== Charts ==
=== Weekly charts ===
Chart (2020)	Peak position
Romania (Airplay 100)	1
Romania (Romanian Radio Airplay)	4
Romania (Romania TV Airplay)	3

=== Year-end charts ===
Chart (2020)	Position
Romania (Airplay 100)	7

Chart (2021)	Position
Romania (Media Forest)	99

== Release history ==
Country	Date	Format(s)	Label	Ref.
Various	4 November 2019	Digital download	Global	

== See also ==
- List of Airplay 100 number ones of the 2020s
