= Ra (song) =

2018 song by Inna

Single by Inna

from the album Yo
- Language: Spanish
- Released: 27 September 2018
- Length: 2:55
- Label: Global; Roc Nation
- Songwriters: Elena Alexandra Apostoleanu; Cristina Maria Chiluiza
- Producers: Sebastian Barac; Marcel Botezan; David Ciente

Inna singles chronology
"No Help" (2018)	"Ra" (2018)	"Iguana" (2018)

Audio sample
- "Ra": file; help

Music video
- "Ra" on YouTube

"Ra" (stylized in all caps) is a song recorded by Romanian singer Inna, digitally released on 27 September 2018 as the lead single from her sixth studio album, Yo (2019), by Global Records. It was entirely written in Spanish by Cristina Maria Chiluiza and Inna, while Sebastian Barac, Marcel Botezan and David Ciente handled the production. A ballad, the song lyrically features a female empowerment message about leaving a toxic relationship and gaining confidence. Its sound differs significantly and acts as a departure from Inna's previous, club-oriented releases.

"Ra" was met with generally positive reviews from music critics upon its release, with a number of them pointing out its catchiness. For promotion, an accompanying, minimalistic music video was uploaded onto the singer's YouTube channel simultaneously with the digital release of the song. Filmed by Bogdan Păun, it portrays Inna and five other women posing together or individually in front of a planter wall. Inna further supported the song with live performances at the 2018 Telehit Awards and on television program Hoy in Mexico in November 2018. It peaked at number 71 on Romania's Airplay 100 ranking.

== Background and composition ==
On 16 October 2018, Inna released a video on her YouTube channel in which she teased her upcoming sixth studio album Yo by briefly elaborating on its creation; in the description of the clip, Inna announced that the first single from the record would be released on 2 November 2018. She eventually confirmed the aforementioned during a social media post and revealed the single's name to be "Ra". Leaked beforehand, "Ra" was digitally made available on the announced date by Roc Nation internationally, with the title stylized in caps for the international release, but released on 27 September 2018 by Global Records in Romania. Two remixes were also released for purchase.

Written entirely in Spanish by Cristina Maria Chiluiza and Inna, "Ra" lyrically features a female empowerment message about leaving a toxic relationship and gaining confidence. This is a topic that Inna rarely addressed in her previous work. The track's title alludes to the ancient Egyptian deity of the sun Ra, symbolizing "the light and the truth". The song was produced and engineered by Sebastian Barac, Marcel Botezan and David Ciente, while Max Kissaru mixed and mastered it. Musically, "Ra" is a ballad, and a departure from Inna's club sound, a "whole new era" according to Jonathan Currinn from website CelebMix. Mike Wass, writing for Idolator, noted that it "represents an important step in the 'Hot' hitmaker's journey from Hi-NRG club queen to a more mature, well-rounded artist". In the song's refrain, Inna repeats the phrase "Yo mejor me voy" (I better go).

== Reception ==
Upon its release, "Ra" received mostly positive reviews from music critics. Currinn of CelebMix opined that it "feels more like an album track rather than an actual single", and suggested it to have been released as a promotional single from Yo. He further acknowledged that "Ra" is "a grower of a song and one that will get stuck in one's head, over time", and also praised the track's touching message, the songwriting and Inna's vocal delivery. Idolator's Wass noted the catchiness of "Ra", naming it an "anthem" and a "hypnotic bop". Billboard included "Ra" in their Best Music Picks Of the Week list for the week ending 4 November 2018. Commercially, the song peaked at number 71 on Romania's Airplay 100 for the week ending 2 December 2018.

== Promotion and other usage ==
Inna teased the accompanying music video for "Ra" with two previews posted to her YouTube channel on 31 October and 1 November 2018, respectively. The visual was ultimately premiered simultaneously with the single's release on YouTube; it features Inna—wearing a black bra and top by Luisa Via Roma—and five fellow women—sporting orange bras—variating from posing together to individually posing in front of a planter wall. NGM Creative's Bogdan Păun directed the clip, while Alexandru Mureșan was hired as the director of photography and Loops Production as the producers. Andra Manea was credited as the make-up artist, Sorin Stratulat as the hair stylist, and RD Styling as the clothes procurers. A video showing the making of "Ra" was released online on 27 November 2018.

Billboard noticed the connection between the song's lyrics and the video, as Inna "stands strong in the visual. It reaffirms the importance of having a voice, especially as a woman". Currinn of CelebMix likened the music video's message to that of Inna's track "No Help" (2018), while Idolator saw it as "striking" and "minimalist". For further promotion of "Ra", Inna delivered a live performance of the song at the 2018 Telehit Awards in Mexico City on 7 November, and performed it on Mexican television daily morning program Hoy on 8 November 2018, among other endeavours in Mexico. On 2 December 2018, Romanian band Noaptea Târziu released a parody of "Ra" titled "Am ghinion" ("I have bad luck").

== Track listing ==
- Digital download
1. "Ra" – 2:55

== Credits and personnel ==
Credits adapted from YouTube.

- Inna – lead vocals, songwriter
- Sebastian Barac – producer, engineer
- Marcel Botezan – producer, engineer
- Cristina Maria Chiluiza – songwriter
- David Ciente – producer, engineer
- Max Kissaru – mixing and mastering

== Charts ==
Chart (2018)	Peak position
Romania (Airplay 100)	71

== Release history ==
Country	Date	Format(s)	Label	Ref.
Romania	27 September 2018	Digital download	Global	
Various	2 November 2018	Digital download	Roc Nation	
