= Sickotoy =

Romanian composer, producer and disc jockey

Alexandru Cotoi
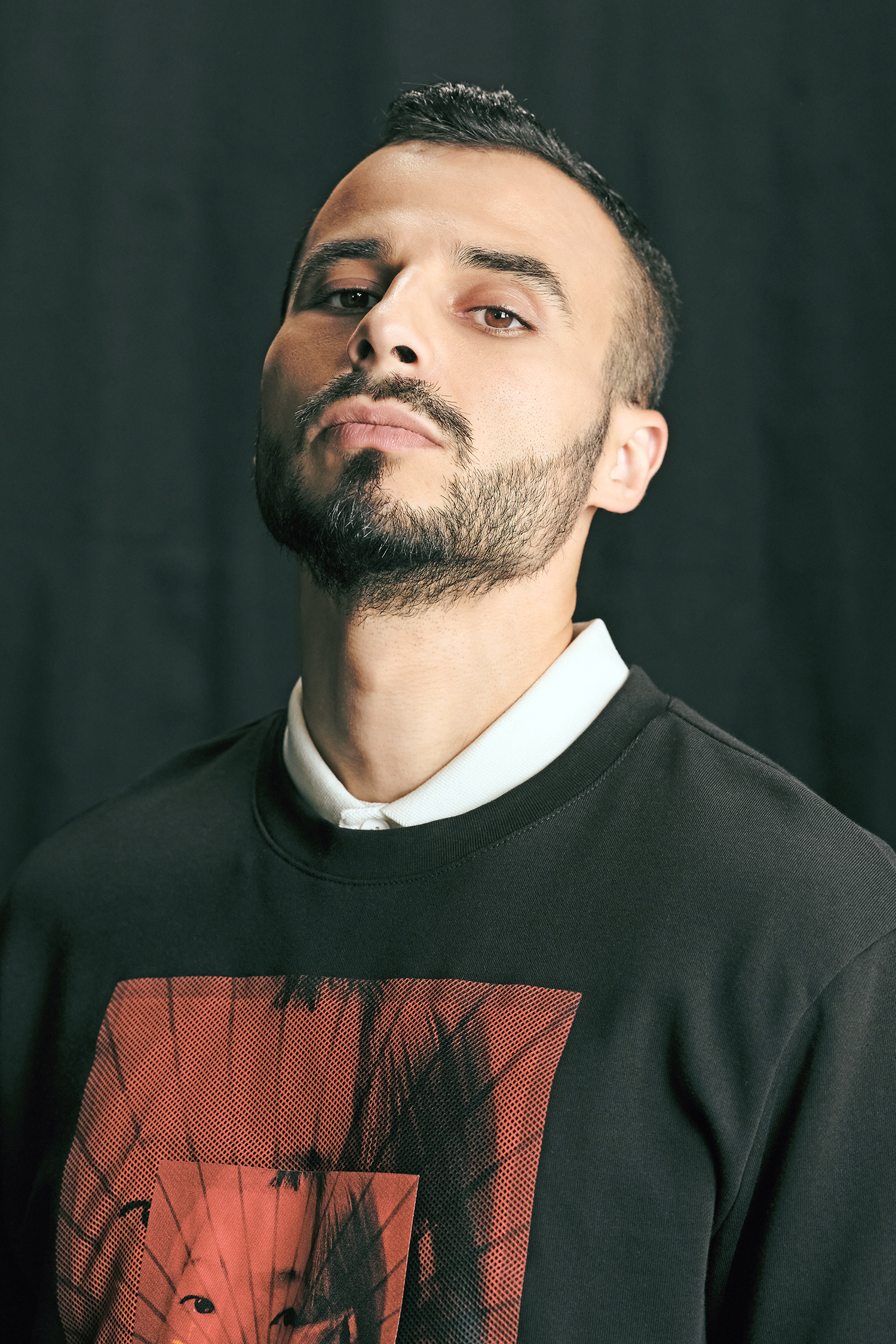
- Cotoi in 2021.

Background information
- Also known as: Alex Cotoi; Kotto; Sickotoy
- Born: Alexandru Florin Cotoi; December 1, 1985 (age 40); Romania
- Genres: EDM; house
- Occupations: Composer; producer; disc jockey
- Label: Global
- Formerly of: Morandi; Sonichouse

Alexandru (Alex) Cotoi, known professionally as Sickotoy (stylised in all capitals) is a Romanian sound producer, composer, and DJ. He is widely known for his work with many singers such as Delia, Inna, Irina Rimes and Alexandra Stan; collaborates with the Global Records label. Under the pseudonym Sickotoy, he released the commercially successful songs "Addicted" and "You Don't Love Me" in 2019 with Minelli and Roxen, respectively, which reached the top three on the Romanian Airplay 100 chart.

== Early life and career ==
Cotoi wrote his first songs in 2003. In October 2007, he formed the music group Sonichouse with Radu Dumitriu, Răzvan Gorcinski, and Victor Bourosu, having met while being part of and performing alongside Morandi. During his time as a member of Sonichouse, Cotoi adopted the nickname of Kotto. Sonichouse released their only album, titled Supersonic, on 16 April 2011. The group stopped releasing music once Bourosu chose to pursue a solo career.

In 2022, he was a jury member on One True Singer, a music competition that was produced by HBO Max in collaboration with Global Records.

== Personal life ==
Cotoi married his girlfriend in July 2018. The couple has a daughter.

== Discography ==
=== Albums ===
Title	Album details
Supersonic (as part of Sonichouse)	Released: 16 April 2011; Format: Digital download, streaming

=== Singles ===
Title	Year	Peak chart positions					Album
Title	Year	ROM	BUL	CIS	RUS	UKR	Album
"Come Home" (as part of Sonichouse)	2010	—	—	—	—	—	Supersonic
"Hold You" (as part of Sonichouse)	2010	—	—	—	—	—	Supersonic
"Morning Sun" (as part of Sonichouse)	2011	—	—	—	—	—	Non-album singles
"Addicted" (featuring Minelli)	2019	2	—	130	—	—	Non-album singles
"You Don't Love Me" (featuring Roxen)	2019	3	7	—	—	—	Non-album singles
"Dum Dum" (with Ilkay Sencan featuring uncredited vocals by Minelli)	2020	20	—	—	—	—	Non-album singles
"VKTM" (with Inna and TAG)	2020	92	—	—	—	—	Non-album singles
"Gasolina" (with Emaa)	2020	13	—	—	—	—	Non-album singles
"Touché" (with Misha Miller)	2020	—	—	—	—	47	Non-album singles
"Snake Dance" (with Forever Kids)	2020	—	—	—	—	—	Non-album singles
"Green Light" (with Aysia and BJ)	2021	47	—	—	—	—	Non-album singles
"Call 911" (with Maruv)	2021	—	—	91	76	—	Non-album singles
"Hollywood" (with BeatItPunk featuring Yoelle)	2021	—	—	—	—	—	Non-album singles
"Billie Jean" (with Bastien)	2021	—	—	—	—	—	Non-album singles
"Dancin' to Forget" (with Randi)	2021	—	—	—	—	—	Non-album singles
"Papa" (with Elvana Gjata and Inna)	2021	18	—	—	—	—	Non-album singles
"Runnin' Out of Love" (with Nethy Aber)	2021	—	—	—	—	—	Non-album singles
"Maria" (with Iraida)	2021	—	—	—	—	—	Non-album singles
"Too Deep" (with Eva Timush)	2022	—	—	—	—	—	Non-album singles
"Said and Done"	2022	—	—	—	—	—	Non-album singles
"Don't Let Me Go" (with Danny Chris)	2023	—	—	20	19	—	Non-album singles
"I Did" (with Minelli)	2025	—	—	—	—	—	Non-album singles
"—" denotes a title that did not chart, or was not released in that territory.
