= Global Records =

Romanian independent record label

- Parent company: Global Labering
- Founded: 2008; 18 years ago
- Founder: Emil Gabriel
- Distributors: Self-distributed (Romania); Global Records Polska; Global Records Russia; Global Records Turkey
- Genre: Various
- Country of origin: Romania
- Location: Bucharest
- Official website: globalrecords.com

Global Records is a Romanian independent record label founded in 2008 by Ștefan Lucian.

== History ==
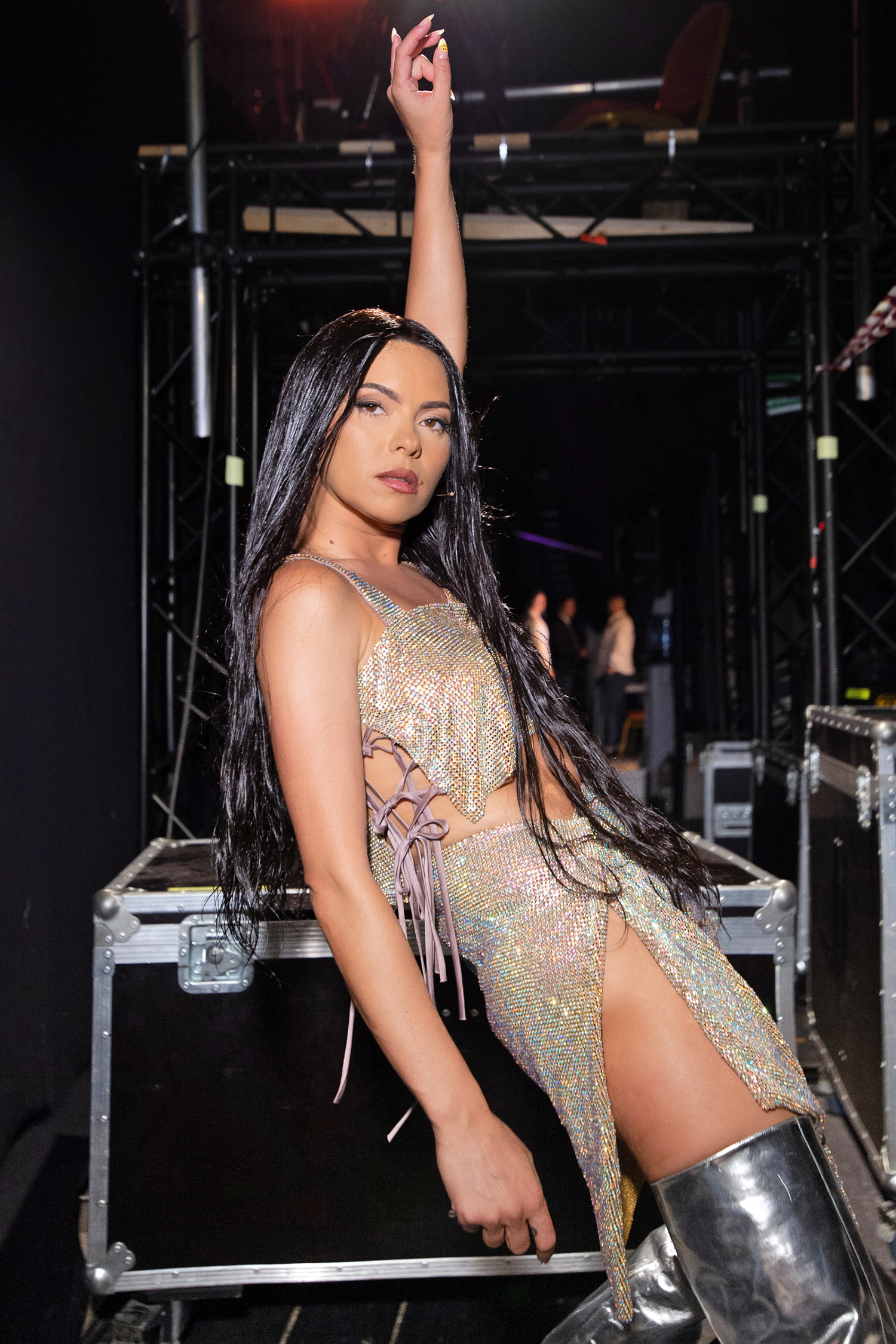
Inna on the set of Masked Singer România 2021

Global Records's first signed artist was Inna in 2008, whose career has been spanning over 10 years. She has released a series of international hits such as "Hot" (2008), "Sun Is Up" (2010), and "More than Friends" (2013) and recorded collaborations with performers including Daddy Yankee and J Balvin. In January 2020, the Romanian public television (TVR) announced a collaboration with the record label to select the Romanian representative for the Eurovision Song Contest 2020, with Roxen being selected with her track "Alcohol You". The contest was however cancelled on 18 March 2020 due to the COVID-19 pandemic. Rotterdam hosted the 2021 contest, and Roxen competed with the track "Amnesia". In February 2022, Wrs released the single "Llámame", with which he represented Romania at the Eurovision Song Contest 2022.

Since August 2020, Global Records has been collaborating with Warner Music Group to promote its artists internationally and to license the Warner repertoire in Romania. The first joint campaign was for Roxen and their then-latest single "How to Break a Heart". As of 2020, Global Records has launched regional divisions in Poland (Global Records Polska), Russia (Global Records Russia) and Turkey (Global Records Turkey).

== Artists ==
- 5GANG
- Adi de la Vâlcea
- Alduts Sherdley
- Alina Eremia
- AMI
- Andrei Ursu
- Antonia
- Bastien
- Carla's Dreams
- Cezar Gună
- Corina
- Dayana
- DJ Project
- DOMINO
- EMAA
- Erika Isac
- Eva Timush
- Florian Rus
- Gran Error
- Inna
- IRAIDA
- Irina Rimes
- Killa Fonic
- Majii
- Minelli
- Mișu
- Nicole Cherry
- Olivia Addams
- PAX (Paradise Auxiliary)
- Rareș
- Randi
- Roxen
- Sickotoy
- Navashy
- Spania'99
- The Motans
- Theo Rose
- Vescan
- Yuka
- Zodier
- NOUA UNSPE
