= List of awards and nominations received by Inna =

Inna awards and nominations
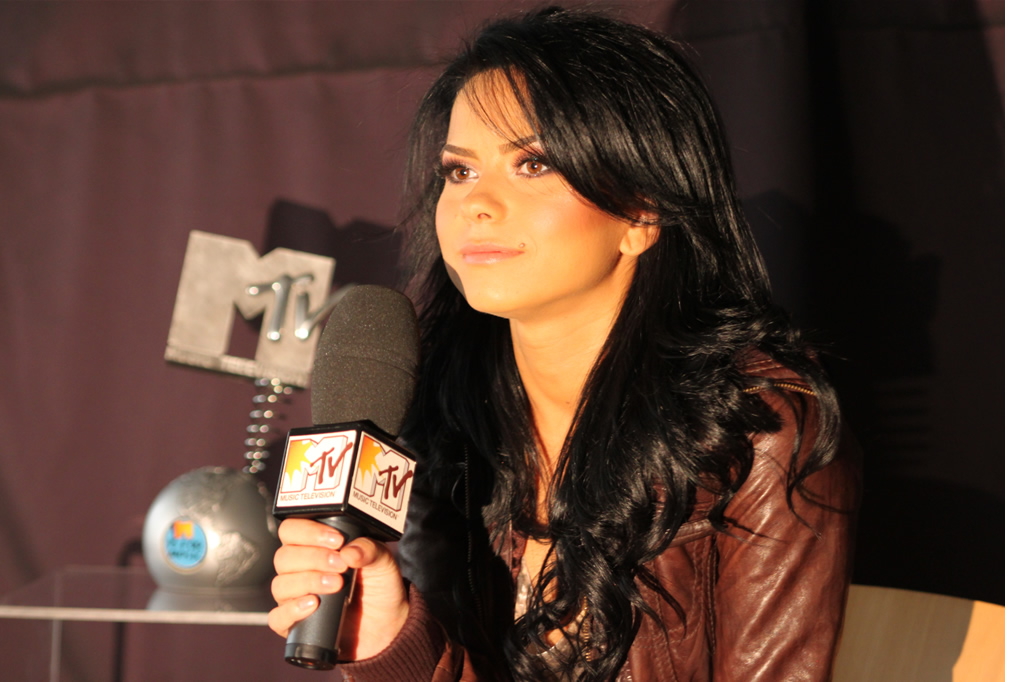
- Inna receiving her trophy for Best Romanian Act during the 2009 MTV Europe Music Awards
Awards and nominations
Award	Wins	Nominations
Balkan Music Awards	5	7
Eurodanceweb Award	1	1
European Border Breakers Award	1	1
Eska Music Awards	1	2
Media Music Awards	2	2
MTV Europe Music Awards	3	5
NRJ Music Awards	0	1
Romanian Music Awards	13	27
RRA Awards	5	16

Totals (Note: Certain award groups do not simply award one winner. They acknowledge several different recipients, have runners-up, and have third place. Since this is a specific recognition and is different from losing an award, runner-up mentions are considered wins in this award tally. For simplification and to avoid errors, each award in this list has been presumed to have had a prior nomination.)
- Wins: 37
- Nominations: 67 (Note: Awards in certain categories do not have prior nominations and only winners are announced by the jury. For simplification and to avoid errors, each award in this list has been presumed to have had a prior nomination.)

Romanian singer Inna, whose ongoing career started in 2008 with her debut single "Hot", has received various awards and nominations. Born on 16 October 1986 in Mangalia and raised in Neptun, Romania, she met native producing trio Play & Win and adopted a pop-rock style, which was later changed to minimal-infused house music. Inna is the recipient of five Balkan Music Awards, one European Border Breakers Award, three MTV Europe Music Awards for Best Romanian Act and fourteen Romanian Music Awards. Inna's debut studio album Hot, including her breakthrough single of the same name, was released in August 2009 and won the Romanian Music Award for Best Album.

I Am the Club Rocker (2011), Inna's second record, was nominated for the same award at the 2012 Romanian Music Awards. The record featured the commercially successful single "Sun Is Up", which won the Eurodanceweb Award in 2010. It was the first time that a Romanian artist had received the award. Her third album Party Never Ends (2013) was nominated for the Romanian Music Awards for Best Album, and the same year, a collaboration with Moldovan musical project Carla's Dreams on "P.O.H.U.I." received the Media Music Award for Best Zonga. Inna released her eponymous studio album in October 2015, which spawned several singles including "Diggy Down". The song topped the Romanian charts in 2014, and was awarded with Best Dance at the Media Music Awards.

== Awards and nominations ==
Name of the award ceremony, year presented, recipient of the award, category and result
Award	Year	Category	Recipient(s)	Result	Ref.
Balkan Music Awards	2010	Best Female Performer in the Balkans 2009	Inna	Nominated	
Balkan Music Awards	2010	Best Song in the Balkans from Romania for 2009	"Love"	Nominated	
Balkan Music Awards	2011	Worldwide Breakthrough	Inna	Won	
Balkan Music Awards	2011	Best Female Artist in the Balkans for 2010	Inna	Won	
Balkan Music Awards	2011	Best Song in the Balkans from Romania for 2010	"Sun Is Up"	Won	
Balkan Music Awards	2012	Best Female Artist in the Balkans for 2011	Inna	Won	
Balkan Music Awards	2012	Best Song in the Balkans from Romania for 2011	"Endless"	Won	
Eurodanceweb Award	2010	Best Song	"Sun Is Up"	Won	
European Border Breakers Awards	2011	Romanian Border Award	Inna	Won	
Eska Music Awards	2009	Best International Song	"Hot"	Nominated	
Eska Music Awards	2010	Artist of the year	Inna	Won	
Media Music Awards	2013	Best Zonga	"P.O.H.U.I." (Carla's Dreams featuring Inna)	Won	
Media Music Awards	2015	Best Dance	"Diggy Down" (featuring Marian Hill)	Won	
MTV Europe Music Awards	2009	Best Romanian Act	Inna	Won	
MTV Europe Music Awards	2010	Best Romanian Act	Inna	Won	
MTV Europe Music Awards	2010	Best European Act	Inna	Nominated	
MTV Europe Music Awards	2015	Best Romanian Act	Inna	Won	
MTV Europe Music Awards	2015	Best European Act	Inna	Nominated	
NRJ Music Awards	2011	International Revelation of the Year	Inna	Nominated	
RRA Awards	2010	Best Pop/Dance Act	Inna	Won	
RRA Awards	2010	Pop/Dance Song of the Year	"Amazing"	Won	
RRA Awards	2011	Artist of the Year	Inna	Nominated	
RRA Awards	2011	Best Pop/Dance Act	Inna	Won	
RRA Awards	2011	Pop/Dance Album of the Year	Hot	Won	
RRA Awards	2011	Pop/Dance Song of the Year	"Sun Is Up"	Nominated	
RRA Awards	2013	Best Pop/Dance Act	Inna	Nominated	
RRA Awards	2014	Pop/Dance Song of the Year	"In Your Eyes"	Nominated	
RRA Awards	2014	Song of the Year	"P.O.H.U.I." (Carla's Dreams featuring Inna)	Nominated	
RRA Awards	2014	Duet of the Year	"P.O.H.U.I." (Carla's Dreams featuring Inna)	Nominated	
RRA Awards	2015	Pop/Dance Song of the Year	"Cola Song" (featuring J Balvin)	Nominated	
RRA Awards	2016	Pop/Dance Song of the Year	"Bop Bop" (featuring Eric Turner)	Won	
RRA Awards	2016	Best Video	"Diggy Down" (featuring Marian Hill)	Nominated	
RRA Awards	2017	Song of the Year	"Heaven"	Nominated	
RRA Awards	2017	Pop/Dance Song of the Year	"Heaven"	Nominated	
RRA Awards	2017	Big Like	"Heaven"	Nominated	
Romanian Music Awards	2009	Best New Act	Inna	Won	
Romanian Music Awards	2009	Best Show	Inna	Won	
Romanian Music Awards	2009	Border Breaker	Inna	Won	
Romanian Music Awards	2009	Best Dance	"Hot"	Won	
Romanian Music Awards	2010	Best Song	"Amazing"	Nominated	
Romanian Music Awards	2010	Best Dance	"Amazing"	Nominated	
Romanian Music Awards	2010	Best Album	Hot	Won	
Romanian Music Awards	2010	Best Website	inna.ro	Won	
Romanian Music Awards	2010	Best Female	Inna	Won	
Romanian Music Awards	2010	Best International Artist	Inna	Won	
Romanian Music Awards	2011	Best Female	Inna	Won	
Romanian Music Awards	2011	Most Popular Artist	Inna	Won	
Romanian Music Awards	2011	OK Award	Inna	Won	
Romanian Music Awards	2011	Best Website	inna.ro	Won	
Romanian Music Awards	2011	Best Dance	"Sun Is Up"	Nominated	
Romanian Music Awards	2011	Best Video	"Club Rocker"	Nominated	
Romanian Music Awards	2012	Best Album	I Am the Club Rocker	Nominated	
Romanian Music Awards	2012	Best Dance	"Wow"	Nominated	
Romanian Music Awards	2012	Best Female	Inna	Nominated	
Romanian Music Awards	2012	Best Borderbreaker	Inna	Won	
Romanian Music Awards	2012	Best Website	inna.ro	Nominated	
Romanian Music Awards	2013	Best Album	Party Never Ends	Nominated	
Romanian Music Awards	2013	Best on Social Media	Inna	Nominated	
Romanian Music Awards	2014	Best Album	Party Never Ends	Nominated	
Romanian Music Awards	2014	Best Video	"Cola Song" (featuring J Balvin)	Nominated	
Romanian Music Awards	2014	Best Hip-Hop	"Strigă!"	Nominated	
Romanian Music Awards	2014	Best on Social Media	Inna	Nominated	
Romanian Music Awards	2022	Best Border Breaker	Inna	Won	
Romanian Music Awards	2022	Best Female	Inna	Nominated	
Romanian Music Awards	2022	Best Dance	"Up"	Nominated	
Top Hit Music Awards	2022	Best International female Singer on the Radio	Inna	Won	
