= 10 Minutes (Inna song) =

- One of the various cover artworks used to commercialize "10 Minutes" worldwide.

Single by Inna feat. Play & Win

from the album Hot
- Released: 25 January 2010
- Genre: Synth-pop; electropop
- Length: 3:19
- Label: DIY; Ultra; Airplay
- Songwriters: Sebastian Barac; Radu Bolfea; Marcel Botezan
- Producers: Barac; Bolfea; Botezan

Inna singles chronology
"Amazing" (2009)	"10 Minutes" (2010)	"Sun Is Up" (2010)

Music video
- "10 Minutes" on YouTube

"10 Minutes" is a song recorded by Romanian singer Inna for her debut studio album, Hot (2009), featuring Romanian trio Play & Win. It was released as the fifth and final single from the record on 25 January 2010. Written and produced by Play & Win members Sebastian Barac, Radu Bolfea and Marcel Botezan, "10 Minutes" is a synth-pop and electropop track stylized to fit the style of music consumed in the United States. Its style was also regarded as a departure from her past work by both Inna and one critic.

Reviewers praised "10 Minutes" and deemed it one of Inna's highlights in her career. The song was aided by an accompanying music video uploaded on 26 June 2010 onto the singer's YouTube channel. Shot by British director Paul Boyd in London, United Kingdom, it mainly portrays Inna residing at a club with fellow background dancers. For further promotion, Inna also performed "10 Minutes" on several occasions, including at the 2010 Romanian Music Awards and during her own Inna: Live la Arenele Romane gig in Bucharest, Romania in 2011. Commercially, the song was a modest hit, reaching the top 20 in a few countries.

== Background and composition ==
"10 Minutes"
A 25-second sample of "10 Minutes", a synth-pop and electropop song influenced by music styles consumed in the United States.

"10 Minutes" was written and produced by Romanian trio Play & Win members Sebastian Barac, Radu Bolfea and Marcel Botezan, and they also received credit as featured artists. It was sent to Romanian radio station Radio 21 on 25 January 2010, as the fourth single from Inna's debut studio album Hot (2009), where it was played for the first time during the "Muzica Ta" ("Your Music") radio programme hosted by Marian Soci. It was leaked before its release. Several remixes were eventually released, including one by Play & Win which featured a horn section compared to Yolanda Be Cool and DCUP's "We No Speak Americano" (2010) by MuuMuse writer Bradley Stern.

Musically, "10 Minutes" is a synth-pop and electropop track, while acting as a departure from Inna's past work to fit the stye of music consumed in the United States. In an interview with Romanian news television network Realitatea TV, Inna confessed: "It will not resemble any of my [previous] singles, it will be something else, the market is already getting enough of the same [sounds], and ['10 Minutes'] will not be slower, but rhythmed."

== Reception ==
"10 Minutes" received generally positive reviews from critics. Neeti Sarkar, writing for The Hindu, praised the dance nature of "10 Minutes", while an editor of Romanian radio station Pro FM listed the song in their list of "16 hits with which Inna made history". MuuMuse's Stern similarly commended the track, however pointing out Inna's Romanian accent, especially in the line "I'm gonna break even [the] law of [the] gravity to see you in [the] morning". He further compared the song to Cascada's works and to "Stilettos" (2010) by Sirens.

Commercially, the single failed to achieve the success of its predecessors. On the native Nielsen Music Control chart, it peaked at number 11 in May 2010, acting as her first entry to not reach the top 10. It earned 6,266 airplay spins on Romanian radio stations in 2010, being the 42nd most-broadcast song of the year. On France's SNEP chart, "10 Minutes" entered at number eight as the highest new entry in December 2010, while simultaneously "Déjà Vu" (2009), "Amazing" (2009) and "Hot" (2008) were ranked at positions 21, 42 and 77, respectively. The song fell to number 11 the next week, while reaching its peak position again in January 2011. "10 Minutes" further reached the top 10 in Czech Republic, on the dance chart of Hungary, and on ZPAV's Polish Airplay New component chart in Poland.

== Music video and promotion ==
An official music video for "10 Minutes" was uploaded onto Inna's official YouTube channel on 26 June, preceded by the premiere of a teaser on 25 June 2010. Reviewing the preview, an editor of Romanian website Urban.ro stated that "taking into account the director and the location, I was expecting more, but maybe the video will look better." The clip was filmed by British director Paul Boyd in London, United Kingdom on 9 June 2010. A behind-the-scenes video was also released subsequently on 16 June 2010. The video begins with Inna doing her make-up in front of a mirror and continues with her dancing in a club and performing choreography with fellow background dancers. Jonathan Harmad from French website Pure Charts thought that Inna "does not change a winning recipe: pretty girls, dancing and a club."

In 2010, the song was performed at the Romanian Music Awards in a medley with "Amazing", "Señorita" (2010) and "Sun Is Up" (2010) on 10 July, and at Kasho Club in Brașov, Romania on 28 December. Another two performances followed in 2011, at the Viva Comet Awards on 24 February, and during her own Inna: Live la Arenele Romane gig in Bucharest, Romania on 17 May, where she arrived by helicopter "like a diva".

== Track listing ==
- Official versions (Note: This acts as a summary of all versions of the single found on Hot and its digital and CD releases.)
1. "10 Minutes (Play & Win Radio Edit Version)" – 3:19
2. "10 Minutes (Play & Win Instrumental)" – 3:18
3. "10 Minutes (Play & Win Remix)" – 4:07
4. "10 Minutes (UK Radio Edit Version)" – 2:34
5. "10 Minutes (Hi Def Radio Edit)" – 3:31
6. "10 Minutes (Hi Def Club Remix)" – 5:24
7. "10 Minutes (Hi Def Dub)" – 5:26
8. "10 Minutes (Liam Keegan Radio Edit)" – 3:50
9. "10 Minutes (Liam Keegan Club Remix)" – 6:59
10. "10 Minutes (Liam Keegan Instrumental)" – 6:26
11. "10 Minutes (DJ Feel Radio Edit)" – 3:37
12. "10 Minutes (DJ Feel Club Remix)" – 6:33
13. "10 Minutes (Chris Garcia Radio Edit)" – 3:37
14. "10 Minutes (Chris Garcia Club Remix)" – 6:18
15. "10 Minutes (Odd Radio Edit)" – 3:27
16. "10 Minutes (Odd Club Remix)" – 6:03
17. "10 Minutes (XNRG Radio Edit)" – 3:43
18. "10 Minutes (XNRG Club Remix)" – 4:48
19. "10 Minutes (Breeze & Klubfiller Remix)" – 5:12

== Charts ==
=== Weekly charts ===
Chart (2010–11)	Peak position
Belgium (Ultratip Bubbling Under Flanders)	15
Belgium (Ultratip Bubbling Under Wallonia)	17
CIS (Tophit)	85
Czech Republic Airplay (ČNS IFPI)	10
France (SNEP)	8
Hungary (Dance Top 40)	5
Netherlands (Dutch Top 40)	18
Netherlands (Single Top 100)	76
Poland Dance (ZPAV)	12
Poland (Polish Airplay New)	4
Romania (Nielsen Music Control)	11
Slovakia Airplay (ČNS IFPI)	34

Chart (2022)	Peak position
Hungary (Rádiós Top 40)	36

=== Year-end charts ===
Chart (2010)	Position
Hungary (Dance Top 40)	4
Romania (Romanian Top 100)	42
Chart (2011)	Position
France (SNEP)	53

== Release and radio history ==
Region	Date	Format	Label
Romania	25 January 2010	Radio airplay	—N/a
Italy	19 May 2010	Digital download	DIY
United States	2 November 2010	Digital download	Ultra
United Kingdom	2 November 2010	Digital download	Ultra
France	27 December 2010	CD single	Airplay

== See also ==
- List of music released by Romanian artists that has charted in major music markets
