= Amazing (Inna song) =

2009 single by Inna

- One of the various cover artworks used to commercialize "Amazing" worldwide.

Single by Inna

from the album Hot
- Released: 6 August 2009
- Genre: Pop • EDM
- Length: 3:31
- Label: Airplay; AATW; B1
- Songwriters: Sebastian Barac; Radu Bolfea; Marcel Botezan
- Producers: Barac; Bolfea; Botezan

Inna singles chronology
| "Déjà Vu" (2009) | "Amazing" (2009) | "10 Minutes" (2010) |

"Amazing" is a song recorded by Romanian singer Inna for her 2009 debut studio album, Hot. It was released as the fourth single from the record on 6 August 2009. Written and produced by Play & Win members Sebastian Barac, Radu Bolfea and Marcel Botezan, "Amazing" is a Pop Music track with a Spanish guitar and beats in its instrumentation. One reviewer regarded the song as being similar to Inna's past work, however, with the addition of new elements. Other music critics gave positive reviews of the single, and praised its construction and foresaw its commercial success.

Play & Win were involved in a breach of contract controversy in August 2009, with Romanian singer Anca Badiu sustaining that "Amazing" had been originally intended for her before released by Inna. The song was aided by an accompanying music video premiered on 10 September 2009. Shot by Tom Boxer at the Atlantic Ocean and near Lisbon (more precisely, in Colares), it portrays the singer surfing and being saved from drowning by a lifeguard. For further promotion, Inna also performed "Amazing" on several occasions, including at the 2010 Eska Music Awards and the MAD Video Music Awards. Commercially, the song topped the charts in Romania and Bulgaria, while reaching the top 20 in multiple other countries. It was also nominated in two categories at the 2010 Romanian Music Awards, and won in the Pop/Dance Song of the Year section at the 2010 Radio România Actualități Awards.

== Background and composition ==
"Amazing"
A 22-second sample of "Amazing", a techno song with a Spanish guitar and beats in its instrumentation, similar to Inna's past work.

"Amazing" was written and produced by Romanian trio Play & Win members Sebastian Barac, Radu Bolfea and Marcel Botezan. It was released on Inna's official website on 6 August 2009, as the fourth single from her debut studio album Hot (2009). The Guardian's Paul Lester noted a Spanish guitar and beats in the song's instrumentation, and called its genre "half-bad Castillian techno". An editor of Romanian website Divercity Cafe wrote that the track was club-oriented and reminiscent of Inna's past work, while incorporating new elements.

== Reception and accolades ==
Upon its release, "Amazing" received generally positive reviews from music critics. An editor of Divercity Cafe praised the harmony between Inna's vocals and the instrumental, and foresaw the single's commercial success. Neeti Sarkar, writing for The Hindu, thought that the song was "quite amazing in the sense it captures a whirlwind of emotions, musically and otherwise." Pro FM listed "Amazing" in their list of "16 hits with which Inna made history". At the 2010 Romanian Music Awards, the track was nominated in the Best Song and Best Dance categories, and won Pop/Dance Song of the Year at the 2010 Radio România Actualități.

Commercially, "Amazing" topped native Nielsen Music Control chart in October 2009 and the Bulgarian charts in December 2009, becoming Inna's second single to reach number one in the first region after "Hot" (2008). In France, "Amazing" debuted at number two on the SNEP chart in June 2010, where it sold 100,000 registered copies as of September 2010. The track opened at number 10 as the highest new entry on Switzerland's Schweizer Hitparade, while other top 10 placements were achieved in Russia, United Kingdom's dance chart, Greece and the Polish dance chart.

== Controversy ==
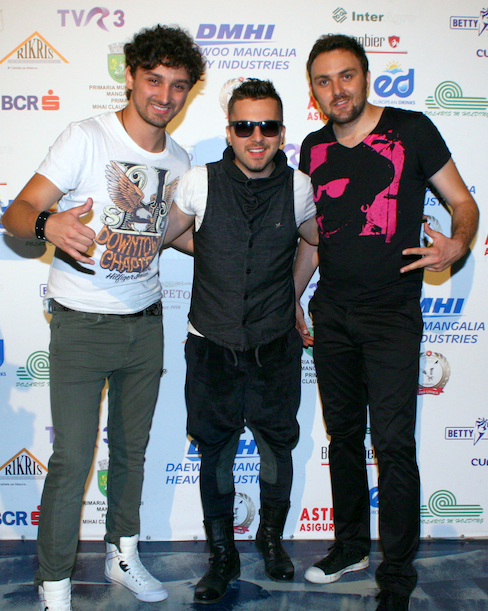
Play & Win were involved in a breach of contract controversy in August 2009.

In August 2009, "Amazing" sparked controversy when Romanian singer Anca Badiu accused Play & Win of "stealing" her song and breach of contract. According to Badiu and MediaPro Music, the label she was signed to at that time, they had paid the production trio €1,500 in advance for "Amazing". However, a few days after Badiu recorded the track and the alleged money transfer occurred, Inna released "Amazing" as a single. Play & Win defended their decision: "We signed the contract with MediaPro Music, but at one point we realized that Anca's version could not be a hit, so we chose Inna['s]." A Showbiz.ro editor questioned the credibility of their pretext in court, but thought that "since in Romania, the copyright laws and contractual obligations of artists and producers are not clearly defined, everything is possible." They also compared the case to a similar one between Romanian musicians Adrian Sînă and Edward Maya regarding the single "Se Thelo" (2009) Sarkar of The Hindu thought that the case was a reason for the song's commercial success.

== Music video ==
An accompanying music video for "Amazing" was premiered on 10 September 2009 on the website of Romanian radio station Radio 21. It was shot by Tom Boxer in late August 2009 at a beach of the Atlantic Ocean and near Lisbon, Portugal in the span of two days. Behind-the-scenes footage was published on Urban.ro on 1 September 2009. Inna recalled of the filming: "It was the first time [Boxer and I] worked together and we understood excellent. I did everything I could to make the video come out well. It was a joy to shoot this clip. I traveled in a beautiful area and I met real surfers. I fell in love with their crazy and unobtrusive style[...]. For the clip, the singer was also required to learn a few surfing moves, which she managed to do in the first day.

The clip begins with shots of the beach and Inna holding a surfboard in her hands, sporting a black wetsuit. She is then seen in a black and white swimsuit and subsequently meets friends to go surfing. Apparently drowning, she is saved by a previously shown "handsome" lifeguard, who brings her to the beach and attempts mouth-to-mouth resuscitation. The video ends with them standing close to each other and a shadowed Inna with a surfboard. Scenes interspersed throughout the video show the singer performing the song as well as showering in a bikini in front of teenage surfer boys who eat ice cream while they stare at her in shock.

== Live performances and other usage ==
In 2010, Inna performed "Amazing" live on 23 April at the Eska Music Awards in Bulgaria, at the MAD Video Music Awards on 24 June in Greece, and on 10 July at the Romanian Music Awards. In the same year, the singer also sang the track on 14 July at the Fun Radio in France, and at French music event Starfloor on 23 October. Inna's appearance at the Eska Music Awards was the subject of controversy due to a kiss between two male background dancers, and she accidentally exposed one of her nipples at Starfloor. She further performed the single during her Inna: Live la Arenele Romane gig in Bucharest on 17 May, where she arrived by helicopter "like a diva", as well as at the NRJ Music Tour Beirut on 23 July 2011. Romanian singer Andreea Bănică covered "Amazing" during Inna's appearance at the 2010 Romanian Music Awards.

== Track listing ==
- Official versions (Note: This acts as a summary of all versions of the single found on Hot and its digital and CD releases.)
1. "Amazing (Play & Win Radio Edit Version)" - 3:31
2. "Amazing (Play & Win Extended Version)" - 4:32
3. "Amazing (UK Radio Edit Version)" - 2:21
4. "Amazing (Buzz Junkies Radio Edit)" - 3:34
5. "Amazing (Buzz Junkies Club Remix)" - 6:14
6. "Amazing (Buzz Junkies Dub)" - 6:14
7. "Amazing (DJ Feel Radio Edit)" - 3:37
8. "Amazing (DJ Feel Original Club Remix)" - 6:12
9. "Amazing (DJ Feel Vox Dub)" - 6:18
10. "Amazing (DJ Feel Instrumental)" - 6:18
11. "Amazing (Almighty Radio Edit)" - 3:58
12. "Amazing (Almighty Club Remix)" - 7:07
13. "Amazing (Almighty Dub)"- 7:06
14. "Amazing (Almighty Instrumental)" - 7:06
15. "Amazing (Frisco Radio Edit)" - 3:15
16. "Amazing (Frisco Club Remix)" - 5:01
17. "Amazing (Klubfiller Radio Edit)"- 3:07
18. "Amazing (Klubfiller Club Remix)" - 5:18

== Credits and personnel ==
Credits adapted from the liner notes of Hot and Urban.ro.

- Inna – lead vocals
- Sebastian Barac – composer, producer
- Radu Bolfea – composer, producer
- Marcel Botezan – composer, producer
- Tom Boxer – music video director

== Charts ==
=== Weekly charts ===
Weekly chart performance for "Amazing"
| Chart (2009–2022) | Peak position |
|---|---|
| Austria (Ö3 Austria Top 40) | 53 |
| Belgium (Ultratop 50 Flanders) | 19 |
| Belgium (Ultratop 50 Wallonia) | 11 |
| Bulgaria Airplay (BAMP) | 1 |
| CIS (Tophit) | 3 |
| Czech Republic Airplay (ČNS IFPI) | 49 |
| European Hot 100 Singles (Billboard) | 10 |
| France (SNEP) | 2 |
| Germany (GfK) | 36 |
| Global Dance Songs (Billboard) | 17 |
| Greece Digital Songs (Billboard) | 8 |
| Hungary (Dance Top 40) | 11 |
| Hungary (Rádiós Top 40) | 38 |
| Hungary (Single Top 40) | 38 |
| Ireland (IRMA) | 43 |
| Italy (FIMI) | 95 |
| Netherlands (Dutch Top 40) | 14 |
| Netherlands (Single Top 100) | 23 |
| Poland Dance (ZPAV) | 9 |
| Romania (Nielsen Music Control) | 1 |
| Russia Airplay (TopHit) | 2 |
| Slovakia Airplay (ČNS IFPI) | 41 |
| Switzerland (Schweizer Hitparade) | 10 |
| UK Singles (Official Charts) | 14 |
| UK Dance (Official Charts) | 5 |

| Chart (2026) | Peak position |
|---|---|
| Greece International (IFPI) | 17 |

=== Year-end charts ===
2009 year-end chart performance for "Amazing"
| Chart (2009) | Position |
|---|---|
| CIS (TopHit) | 72 |
| Hungary (Dance Top 40) | 72 |
| Russia Airplay (TopHit) | 74 |

2010 year-end chart performance for "Amazing"
| Chart (2010) | Position |
|---|---|
| Belgium (Ultratop 50 Flanders) | 82 |
| European Hot 100 Singles (Billboard) | 51 |
| France (SNEP) | 24 |
| Hungary (Dance Top 40) | 60 |
| Netherlands (Dutch Top 40) | 66 |
| Romania (Romanian Top 100) | 66 |
| Russia Airplay (TopHit) | 21 |

== Certifications ==
Certifications for "Amazing"
| Region | Certification | Certified units/sales |
|---|---|---|
| United Kingdom (BPI) | Silver | 200,000^{‡} |
Streaming
| Greece (IFPI Greece) | Platinum | 2,000,000^{†} |
^{‡} Sales+streaming figures based on certification alone.^{†} Streaming-only figures based on certification alone.

== Release history ==
Release dates and formats for "Amazing"
| Region | Date | Format | Label |
|---|---|---|---|
| Romania | 6 August 2009 | —N/a | —N/a |
| France | 21 June 2010 | CD single | Airplay |
| United Kingdom | 23 August 2010 | CD single | AATW |
| Germany | 24 September 2010 | CD single | B1 Recordings |

== See also ==
- List of music released by Romanian artists that has charted in major music markets
- List of Romanian Top 100 number ones
