= Flashbacks (song) =

Single by Inna

from the album Heartbreaker
- Released: 20 January 2021
- Recorded: November 2020
- Genre: Electro dance; dance-pop
- Length: 2:57
- Songwriters: Elena Alexandra Apostoleanu; Sebastian Barac; Marcel Botezan; David Ciente; Alexandru Cotoi; Minelli
- Producers: Sebastian Barac; Marcel Botezan; David Ciente; Alexandru Cotoi

Inna singles chronology
"Read My Lips" (2020)	"Flashbacks" (2021)	"Cool Me Down" (2021)

Music video
- "Flashbacks" on YouTube

"Flashbacks" is a song recorded by Romanian singer Inna for her seventh studio album, Heartbreaker (2020). It was written by Inna and Minelli alongside its producers Sebastian Barac, Marcel Botezan, David Ciente and Alexandru Cotoi. On 20 January 2021, the song was serviced as the lead single of the album to Romanian radio stations. An electropop and EDM-inspired electro dance and dance-pop track, it is driven by a piano loop and slap bass. Lyrically, the song talks about a woman struggling to let go of her love interest who is far away.

Two music critics gave positive reviews of "Flashbacks" upon release, with one singling it out as his favorite track on Heartbreaker. An accompanying music video was directed by Bogdan Păun and uploaded to the singer's YouTube channel on 26 February 2021. Filmed at the Palazzo Versace Dubai and at Domeniul Manasia in Romania, it portrays Inna in various settings, wearing a sparkling silver outfit. Commercially, the song experienced success, reaching the top position in Russia, and the top ten in Romania, Bulgaria, Ukraine and the Commonwealth of Independent States.

== Background and release ==
"Flashbacks" was written by Elena Alexandra Apostoleanu (Inna) and Minelli alongside its producers Sebastian Barac, Marcel Botezan, David Ciente and Alexandru Cotoi. It is part of Inna's seventh studio album Heartbreaker, which was recorded during a three-week period in November 2020 at a rented Bucharest mansion with two recording studios in which Inna resided with the songwriters and producers mentioned.

"Flashbacks" was released as part of the album for streaming to YouTube and SoundCloud by Global Records on 27 November 2020, while being issued to fellow platforms and released for digital download a week later under the same label. On the later occasion, Global Records also released all of the album's songs—including "Flashbacks"—as promotional singles. On 20 January 2021, the track was sent to Romanian radio stations as the lead single of Heartbreaker by Global. It was eventually serviced to Italian radio stations on 19 March 2021 by CDF Records. Eleven remixes of the song were further made available. (Note: This acts as a summary of all digital versions of the single.)

== Composition and reception ==
Music critics described "Flashbacks" as an electro dance and dance-pop song with elements of electropop and EDM. Dance-Charts' Manuel Probst singled the track out as his favorite song on Heartbreaker and noticed "atmospheric" sounds, a piano loop and slap bass in its composition. Zangba Thomson from Bong Mines Entertainment described the song as a "heartfelt tune" containing "ear-welcoming vocals" and "tuneful melodies", while saying it tells an "intriguing" tale about an insecure and confused woman who struggles to let go of a special person in her life that she is miles apart from and shares memories with.

Lyrics from the song include: "I'm on the road, empty and cold to a distant destination I don't know / Been thinking about you, we back in days of all / It's hard to admit it, I still miss you, miss you so" and "Flashbacks of our memories, the past is my enemy, and I'm drowning in a sad melody / Flashbacks of our memory, the past is my enemy / It keeps holding, holding on me / Come break the silence." Upon entering the Shazam chart in Russia, the song experienced commercial success on the radio ranking in the region, peaking at number one. It also reached number two in the Commonwealth of Independent States, number two in Ukraine, number four in Romania, and number seven in Bulgaria.

== Music video and promotion ==
A music video for "Flashbacks" was uploaded to Inna's YouTube channel on 26 February 2021, with it being sent to Romanian television channels on 24 March 2021. It was directed by Bogdan Păun and filmed in early 2021 at the Palazzo Versace Dubai and at Domeniul Manasia in Romania. The production was handled by Loops Production, while Alexandru Mureșan acted as the director of photography. Make-up, hair and outfits were done by Anca Buldur, Adonis Enache and RDStyling, respectively. The video switches between color and sepia scenes and shows Inna wearing a sparkling silver dress and boots in different settings—lying on a couch and in a bathtub, walking inside a hotel, placing her head outside of the window of a moving car in traffic, and frustratingly screwing up her make-up in front of a mirror. For further promotion, Inna performed "Flashbacks" live for Radio ZU on 15 April, as well as during her Summer Live Sessions series on YouTube on 3 August 2021. For Pro TV's 2021 New Year's Eve televised event ProTevelion, Inna performed the track live along with "De dragul tău" (2021).

== Track listing ==
- Official versions
1. "Flashbacks" — 2:57
2. "Flashbacks (Maesic Remix)" — 2:33
3. "Flashbacks (Robert Cristian Remix)" — 3:13
4. "Flashbacks (DJ Tuncay Albayrak Remix)" — 2:46
5. "Flashbacks (Nomad Digital Remix)" — 3:31
6. "Flashbacks (SYDE x NVRMIND Remix)" — 3:23
7. "Flashbacks (Yalçın Aşan Remix)" — 2:58
8. "Flashbacks (Gldn, Five and Last60 Remix)" — 2:14
9. "Flashbacks (Suark Remix)" — 2:44
10. "Flashbacks (Danny Burg Remix)" — 2:55
11. "Flashbacks (Asher Remix)" — 3:32
12. "Flashbacks (DFM Remix)" — 3:47
13. "Flashbacks (CoDjo Remix)" — 3:26

== Charts ==
=== Weekly charts ===
Weekly chart performance for "Flashbacks"
Chart (2021)	Peak position
Bulgaria (PROPHON)	7
CIS Airplay (TopHit)	2
Romania (Airplay 100)	4
Romania Airplay (Media Forest)	2
Romania TV Airplay (Media Forest)	3
Russia Airplay (TopHit)	1
Ukraine Airplay (TopHit)	2

=== Monthly charts ===
Monthly chart performance for "Flashbacks"
Chart (2021)	Peak position
CIS (TopHit)	2
Russia Airplay (TopHit)	2
Ukraine Airplay (TopHit)	4

=== Year-end charts ===
2021 year-end chart performance for "Flashbacks"
Chart (2021)	Position
CIS (TopHit)	5
Romania (Media Forest)	1
Russia Airplay (TopHit)	6
Ukraine Airplay (TopHit)	6

2022 year-end chart performance for "Flashbacks"
Chart (2022)	Position
Russia Airplay (TopHit)	195
Ukraine Airplay (TopHit)	79

2023 year-end chart performance for "Flashbacks"
Chart (2023)	Position
Ukraine Airplay (TopHit)	197

== Release history ==
Release dates and formats for "Flashbacks"
Country	Date	Format(s)	Label(s)	Ref.
Various	4 December 2020 (Note: Released as a promotional single.)	Digital download; streaming	Global	
Romania	20 January 2021	Radio airplay	Global	
Italy	19 March 2021	Radio airplay	CDF	
