= Love (Inna song) =

Single by Inna

from the album Hot
- Released: 16 February 2009
- Genre: EDM; house
- Length: 4:14
- Label: Ultra; 3Beat; Spinnin'; DIY; Roton
- Songwriters: Sebastian Barac; Radu Bolfea; Marcel Botezan
- Producers: Barac; Bolfea; Botezan

Inna singles chronology
| "Hot" (2008) | "Love" (2009) | "Déjà Vu" (2009) |

"Love" is a song recorded by Romanian singer Inna for her debut studio album, Hot (2009). It was released as the second single from the record on 16 February 2009. Written and produced by Play & Win members Sebastian Barac, Radu Bolfea and Marcel Botezan, "Love" is an EDM and house track. Its lyrics revolve around the potential complications related with love. The song was described as containing high-pitched vocals by one reviewer, as well as compared to the work of English rock band New Order. Another critic foresaw the single to be commercially successful.

It was aided by an accompanying music video, which was uploaded onto label Roton's official YouTube channel on 7 May 2009. The clip was filmed near Bucharest, Romania by Bogdan Bărbulescu and portrays a fight between good and evil. For further promotion, Inna also performed "Love" at the Bulgarian event Loop Live in October 2009. Commercially, the song reached the top ten of the charts in Romania, Slovakia, Czech Republic and Hungary.

== Release and composition ==
"Love"
An 18-second sample of "Love", an EDM and house song featuring high-pitched vocals; it was compared to the work of English rock band New Order.

"Love" was exclusively presented on Romanian website Urban.ro and released to Romanian radio station Radio 21 on 16 February 2009, where it was played for the first time during the "Muzica Ta" ("Your Music") radio programme hosted by Marian Soci. The single's radio release had previously been delayed for unknown reasons. On Radio 21's website, a sample of the song was also posted prior to its premiere, while an editor thought that it was Inna's "gift" for her fans for Valentine's Day.

Written and produced by Romanian trio Play & Win members Sebastian Barac, Radu Bolfea and Marcel Botezan, "Love" was released as the second single from Hot (2009), Inna's debut studio album, following her debut song of the same name (2008). According to The Hindu's Neeti Sarkar, "Love" is a cadenced song that belongs to the EDM and house genres. Its lyrics talk about "how complicated situations of love can become". Paul Lester of The Guardian noticed "high-on-helium girly vocals" in the composition of "Love" and Hot album track "On and On". He also compared both songs to the work of English rock band New Order, listing their track "True Faith" (1987) as an example.

== Reception and accolades ==
An editor of Romanian magazine Unica predicted the recording to be commercially successful. It reached number four on the Romanian Nielsen Music Control chart, Inna's second consecutive top five hit in the nation after her debut single "Hot" topped the chart in December 2008. "Love" also peaked at number five in Slovakia, while further top 10 placements were achieved in Hungary and Czech Republic. In Spain, the recording debuted on the Spanish Singles Chart at number 37 as that week's highest debut, while peaking at number 31. "Love" was nominated in the Top 1 Romania 2009 and Girls – The Best Hit 2009 categories at the 2009 Romanian Top Hits Awards, as well as in the Best Song in the Balkans from Romania for 2009 category at the 2010 Balkan Music Awards.

== Music video ==
A screenshot from the music video of "Love", showing Inna between two parties of people dressed in black and white. According to a reviewer, the clip portrays a fight between good and evil, with the singer linking the two worlds by sporting a dress containing colors from both parties.

An accompanying music video for "Love" was uploaded onto label Roton's official YouTube channel on 7 May 2009. It was shot by Bogdan Bărbulescu on 21 April 2009 in an abandoned hall in Bucharest, Romania during the span of 14 hours. Filming began at about 8:00 in the morning. According to Unica, Bărbulescu's concept for the video was a fight between good and evil, which he showcased through "impressive" contrasts. Making-of footage of the clip was published on the same day on Urban.ro.

The visual opens with a confluence of black and white flowing water fluxes, followed by a ballerina pirouetting through the air "in a grim decor, full of old machines". Subsequently, a boxer is shown beating a punching bag, while a topless man empties a water bottle onto him and a woman sporting a white hoodie holds a bat in her hands. Later in the video, the aforementioned appear to fight against people masked entirely in black. Near the end, Inna walks among the two parties before they disappear. Interspresed shots show the singer wearing a white leotard with a black corset and a long white veil attached to it, as well as the topless man jumping in the air. Some of the video's scenes are played in slow motion or backwards.

An editor of Unica praised the clip's concept and elaborated: "The link between the two worlds [of good and evil] is made by Inna, who wears a special outfit meant to highlight both the positives and the negative characters. The new video brings us a happy end in which love conquers, as we can see from the title of the single." They also thought that the clip was awaited in "more than 10 countries" due to the success of Inna's precedent single.

== Track listing ==
- Official versions (Note: This acts as a summary of all versions of the single found on Hot and its digital and CD releases.)
1. "Love (Play & Win Radio Edit Version)" – 3:39
2. "Love (Play & Win Extended Version)" – 5:02
3. "Love (Original Version)" – 4:14
4. "Love (UK Radio Edit Version)" – 2:23
5. "Love (Dandeej Remix)" – 5:15
6. "Love (DJ Andi Remix)" – 5:44
7. "Love (eSQUIRE Radio Edit)" – 3:54
8. "Love (eSQUIRE Club Remix)" – 5:57
9. "Love (7th Heaven Radio Edit)" – 3:51
10. "Love (7th Heaven Club Remix)" – 6:35
11. "Love (Klubfiller Club Remix)" – 6:35
12. "Love (Klubfiller Dub)" – 6:30

== Charts ==
=== Weekly charts ===
| Chart (2009–2010) | Peak position |
|---|---|
| Czech Republic Airplay (ČNS IFPI) | 8 |
| Bulgaria (Airplay Top5) | 4 |
| CIS (Tophit) | 144 |
| Hungary (Dance Top 40) | 1 |
| Hungary (Rádiós Top 40) | 9 |
| Netherlands (Dutch Top 40) | 12 |
| Netherlands (Single Top 100) | 31 |
| Poland Dance (ZPAV) | 45 |
| Romania (Nielsen Music Control) | 4 |
| Slovakia Airplay (ČNS IFPI) | 5 |
| Spain (Promusicae) | 31 |

=== Year-end charts ===
| Chart (2009) | Position |
|---|---|
| Hungary (Dance Top 40) | 1 |
| Hungary (Rádiós Top 40) | 70 |

| Chart (2010) | Position |
|---|---|
| Hungary (Dance Top 40) | 67 |
| Netherlands (Dutch Top 40) | 72 |

== Release and radio history ==
| Region | Date | Format | Label |
|---|---|---|---|
| Romania | 16 February 2009 | Radio airplay | —N/a |
| United Kingdom | 1 December 2009 | Digital download | Ultra |
| United Kingdom | N/A 2011 | Promotional CD single | 3Beat |
| United States | 1 December 2009 | Digital download | Ultra |
| Netherlands | 13 March 2010 | Digital download | Spinnin' |
| Netherlands | 2 April 2010 | CD single | Spinnin' |
| Italy | 14 April 2010 | CD single | DIY |
| Italy | 22 April 2010 | Digital download | DIY |
| Japan | 4 July 2012 | Digital download | Roton |

== See also ==
- List of music released by Romanian artists that has charted in major music markets
