= List of number-one singles of 2009 (Spain) =

This is a list of the Spanish PROMUSICAE Top 20 Singles number-ones of 2009.

== 2009 ==
Issue date	Artist	Song
January 4	Carlos Baute feat. Marta Sanchez	"Colgando en tus manos"
January 11	Carlos Baute feat. Marta Sanchez	"Colgando en tus manos"
January 19	Carlos Baute feat. Marta Sanchez	"Colgando en tus manos"
January 26	Carlos Baute feat. Marta Sanchez	"Colgando en tus manos"
February 2	Carlos Baute feat. Marta Sanchez	"Colgando en tus manos"
February 9	Carlos Baute feat. Marta Sanchez	"Colgando en tus manos"
February 16	Carlos Baute feat. Marta Sanchez	"Colgando en tus manos"
February 23	Carlos Baute feat. Marta Sanchez	"Colgando en tus manos"
March 2	Carlos Baute feat. Marta Sanchez	"Colgando en tus manos"
March 9	Carlos Baute feat. Marta Sanchez	"Colgando en tus manos"
March 16	Carlos Baute feat. Marta Sanchez	"Colgando en tus manos"
March 23	Carlos Baute feat. Marta Sanchez	"Colgando en tus manos"
March 30	Carlos Baute feat. Marta Sanchez	"Colgando en tus manos"
April 6	Carlos Baute feat. Marta Sanchez	"Colgando en tus manos"
April 13	Carlos Baute feat. Marta Sanchez	"Colgando en tus manos"
April 20	Carlos Baute feat. Marta Sanchez	"Colgando en tus manos"
April 27	Carlos Baute feat. Marta Sanchez	"Colgando en tus manos"
May 4	Carlos Baute feat. Marta Sanchez	"Colgando en tus manos"
May 11	Carlos Baute feat. Marta Sanchez	"Colgando en tus manos"
May 18	Carlos Baute feat. Marta Sanchez	"Colgando en tus manos"
May 24	Carlos Baute feat. Marta Sanchez	"Colgando en tus manos"
May 31	Carlos Baute feat. Marta Sanchez	"Colgando en tus manos"
June 7	Carlos Baute feat. Marta Sanchez	"Colgando en tus manos"
June 14	Carlos Baute feat. Marta Sanchez	"Colgando en tus manos"
June 21	Carlos Baute feat. Marta Sanchez	"Colgando en tus manos"
June 28	Macaco	"Moving"
July 5	Carlos Baute feat. Marta Sanchez	"Colgando En Tus Manos"
July 12	Michael Jackson	"Thriller"
July 19	Carlos Baute feat. Marta Sanchez	"Colgando En Tus Manos"
July 26	Inna	"Hot"
August 2	Pitbull	"I Know You Want Me (Calle Ocho)"
August 9	Pitbull	"I Know You Want Me (Calle Ocho)"
August 16	Pitbull	"I Know You Want Me (Calle Ocho)"
August 23	Pitbull	"I Know You Want Me (Calle Ocho)"
August 30	Pitbull	"I Know You Want Me (Calle Ocho)"
September 6	Pitbull	"I Know You Want Me (Calle Ocho)"
September 13	Pitbull	"I Know You Want Me (Calle Ocho)"
September 20	David Bisbal	"Esclavo de Sus Besos"
September 27	David Bisbal	"Esclavo de Sus Besos"
October 4	David Bisbal	"Esclavo de Sus Besos"
October 11	David Bisbal	"Esclavo de Sus Besos"
October 18	Manuel Carrasco & Malú	"Que Nadie"
October 25	Manuel Carrasco & Malú	"Que Nadie"
November 1	Manuel Carrasco & Malú	"Que Nadie"
November 8	Manuel Carrasco & Malú	"Que Nadie"
November 15	Manuel Carrasco & Malú	"Que Nadie"
November 22	Buraka Som Sistema	"Kalemba (Wegue-Wegue)"
November 29	Alejandro Sanz feat. Alicia Keys	"Looking for Paradise"
December 6	Buraka Som Sistema	"Kalemba (Wegue-Wegue)"
December 13	Buraka Som Sistema	"Kalemba (Wegue-Wegue)"
December 20	Buraka Som Sistema	"Kalemba (Wegue-Wegue)"
December 27	Buraka Som Sistema	"Kalemba (Wegue-Wegue)"

== See also ==
- 2009 in music
- List of number-one hits in Spain
