= Just Dance (album) =

Studio album by Inna
- Released: 10 February 2023 (#DQH1); 14 April 2023 (#DQH2)
- Recorded: 2022
- Genre: EDM; experimental
- Length: 15:01 (#DQH1); 12:53 (#DQH2)
- Language: English; Spanish
- Label: Global
- Producer: Alexandru Cotoi; Sebastian Barac; Marcel Botezan; Viky Red; Alexandru Turcu

Inna chronology
Champagne Problems (2022)	Just Dance (2023)	El Pasado (2024)

Alternative cover

Just Dance is the ninth studio album by Romanian singer Inna. It was released in two parts, Just Dance #DQH1 and Just Dance #DQH2, that were made available for digital download and streaming through Global Records on 10 February and 14 April 2023, respectively. Inna vlogged the progress of Just Dance through her YouTube channel. The daily episodic videos were part of the third season of her Dance Queen's House series. The singer collaborated with several producers on the record, including Alexandru Cotoi (known as SICKOTOY), Sebastian Barac, Marcel Botezan, Adelina Stinga, Viky Red, and Alexandru Turcu. Just Dance has been described as EDM and its subgenres, with influences varying from Eurodance and house.

== Background and release ==
On 27 November 2020, Inna released her seventh studio album Heartbreaker. Sessions for the album took place over a three-week period at a rented Bucharest mansion, where Inna resided in with Romanian songwriters and producers Sebastian Barac, Marcel Botezan, David Ciente, Alexandru Cotoi and Minelli. She documented the progress of the album with daily vlogs on her YouTube channel—which constituted the first season of her series Dance Queen's House. On 7 January 2022 and 11 March 2022, Inna followed this up with the release of her eighth studio album, Champagne Problems (album). This album was recorded in 16 days as part of the second season of her series Dance Queen's House.

Inna announced the third season of Dance Queen's House on YouTube on 3 December 2022 through a trailer video. Recording sessions for the album took place over 16 days, the same as in her eighth studio album. In an interview with Popdust, the singer says the process of recording the album was "intense and fun, with a lot of inspiration and fresh vibes from Alex Cotoi, Iraida and Marco & Seba, the creative team behind the album." The first section of the album was released 10 February 2023 through digital download, with visuals created by Florin Burlacu and Andrei Via being released for each track being released on YouTube. Following the release of the first section, Inna teased the release of "My Crystal Nails", a standalone single.

== Composition and reception ==
Just Dance is an EDM, club-pop, experimental, deep house with Eurodance influences. Inna has described the album as "a refresh" from her past and "an important step in my evolution as an artist." The album is eclectic, featuring an array of dance genres fused together in new ways. Many of the tracks shy away from typical song structure, opting not to include a bridge or final chorus. The sound of the album shifts away from the Romanian dance sound she explored on her seventh studio album, Heartbreaker, instead opting for a more experimental sound.

DQH1 features "dreamy" dance sounds. In an interview with Popdust, the singer said her favourite track is "We Should Get Lost". DQH2 is includes tracks with Eurodance beats that are written in both English and Spanish. According to Celebmix, Inna "ventures into the electronic landscape and experiments more freely than ever before" on the tracks "Que Dolor" and "Queen of the Club".

== Track listing ==
All lyrics written by Elena Alexandra Apostoleanu and Adelina Stîngă

Just Dance #DQH1 track listing
No.	Title	Writer(s)	Producer(s)	Length
1.	"We Should Get Lost"	Alexandru Cotoi; Elena Alexandra Apostoleanu; Marcel Botezan; Sebastian Barac; Adelina Stîngă	Marco & Seba; Sickotoy	2:08
2.	"Nothing I Won't Do"	Cotoi; Apostoleanu; Botezan; Barac; Stîngă	Marco & Seba; Sickotoy	1:54
3.	"Something 'bout You"	Cotoi; Apostoleanu; Botezan; Barac; Stîngă	Marco & Seba; Sickotoy	2:22
4.	"I'll Be There"	Cotoi; Apostoleanu; Botezan; Barac; Stîngă	Marco & Seba; Sickotoy	2:49
5.	"Just Dance"	Cotoi; Apostoleanu; Botezan; Barac; Stîngă	Marco & Seba; Sickotoy	2:54
6.	"Start a Fire"	Cotoi; Apostoleanu; Botezan; Barac; Stîngă	Marco & Seba; Sickotoy	3:04
Total length:				15:01

Just Dance #DQH2 track listing
No.	Title	Writer(s)	Producer(s)	Length
1.	"Que Dolor"	Cotoi; Apostoleanu; Botezan; Barac; Stîngă	Marco & Seba; Sickotoy	2:25
2.	"Can't Give You Up"	Cotoi; Apostoleanu; Botezan; Barac; Stîngă	Marco & Seba; Sickotoy	2:33
3.	"In My Mind"	Cotoi; Apostoleanu; Botezan; Barac; Stîngă	Marco & Seba; Sickotoy	2:27
4.	"Follow Me"	Cotoi; Apostoleanu; Botezan; Barac; Stîngă	Marco & Seba; Sickotoy	2:26
5.	"Queen of the Club"	Cotoi; Apostoleanu; Botezan; Barac; Stîngă	Marco & Seba; Sickotoy	3:04
Total length:				12:53

== Release history ==
Release history and formats for Just Dance
Region	Date	Format	Label
Various	10 February 2023	Digital download; streaming	Global
Various	14 April 2023	Digital download; streaming	Global
