= That's My Name =

Single by Akcent

from the album True Believers
- Released: 2009
- Length: 4:06
- Label: Ultra Records
- Songwriters: Adrian Sina; Lavinia Sima; Eduard Ilie
- Producer: Edward Maya

Akcent singles chronology
"Lover's Cry" (2008)	"That's My Name" (2009)	"Happy People" (2009)

"That's My Name" is a single by Romanian dance-pop group Akcent. It was produced by Romanian DJ and producer Edward Maya, thus sounding similar to his hit "Stereo Love", notable for its famous accordion hook. Akcent promoted the song by performing in a number of events, and visited countries like India and Pakistan, performing at parties and nightclubs. It was included in the Just Dance: Volume 3 compilation album released by The Island Def Jam Music Group. "That's My Name" had been well received by fans. Ultra Records in the U.S. released the song as well in 2010-12.

== Charts ==
Chart (2009)	Peak position
Bulgaria Airplay (BAMP)	12
Greece (Greece Digital Songs)	1
Romania (Romanian Top 100)	5
