= Popcorn (Romanian music style) =

Subgenre of dance music

Romanian popcorn
- Stylistic origins: Europop; dance-pop; house; trance
- Cultural origins: 2000s, Romania

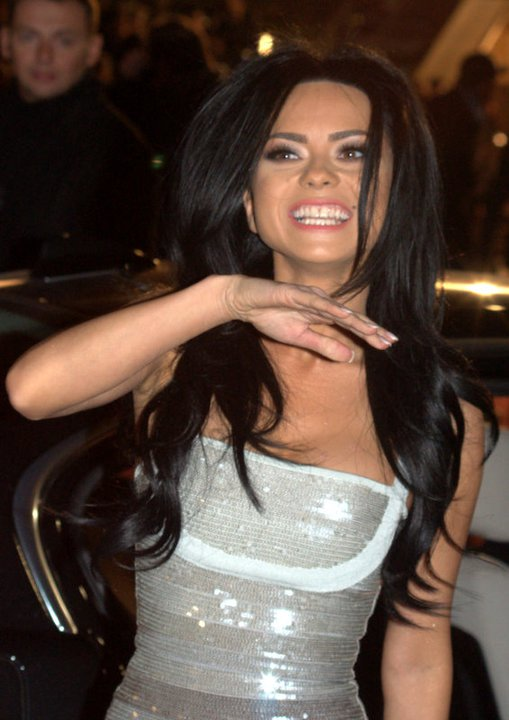
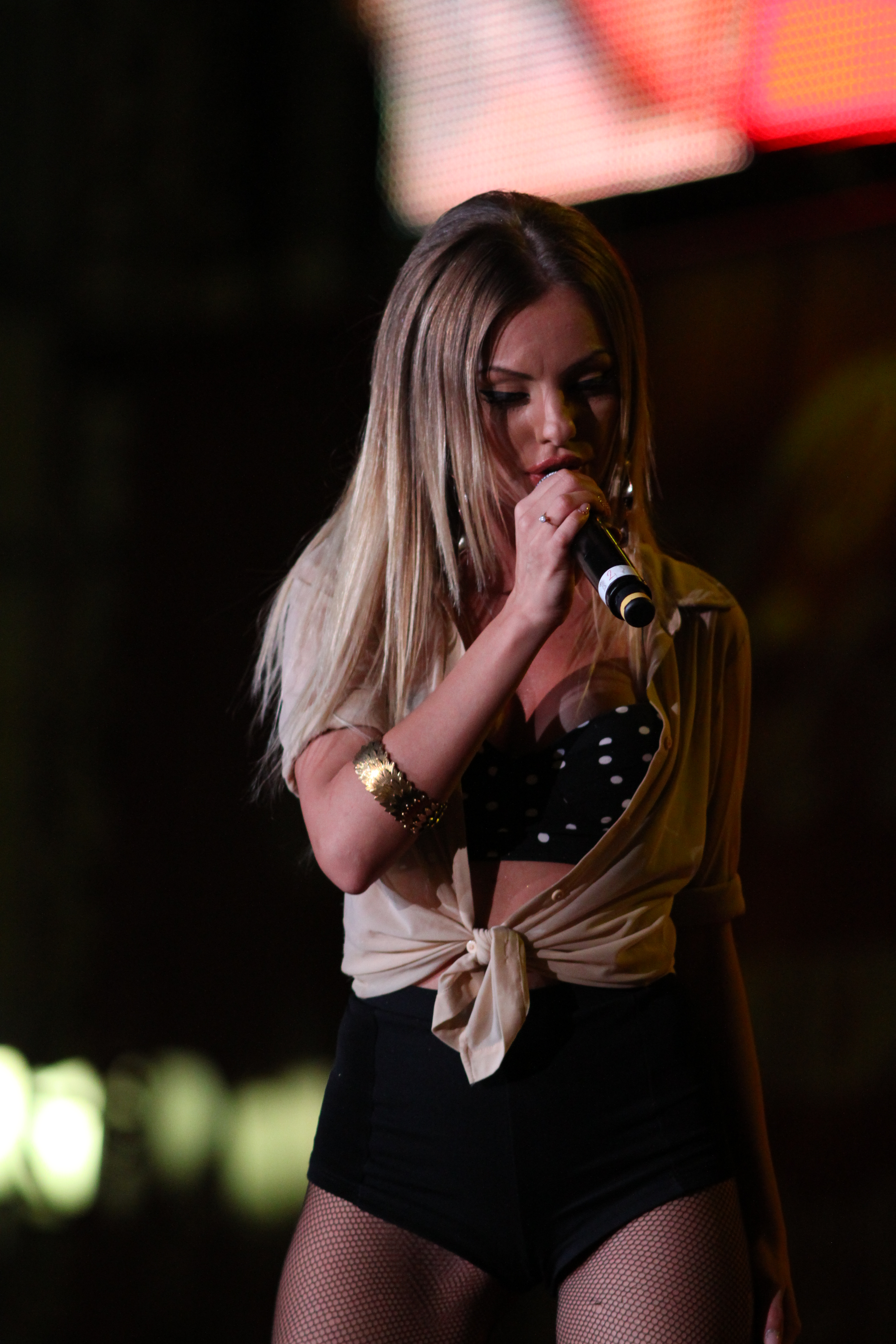
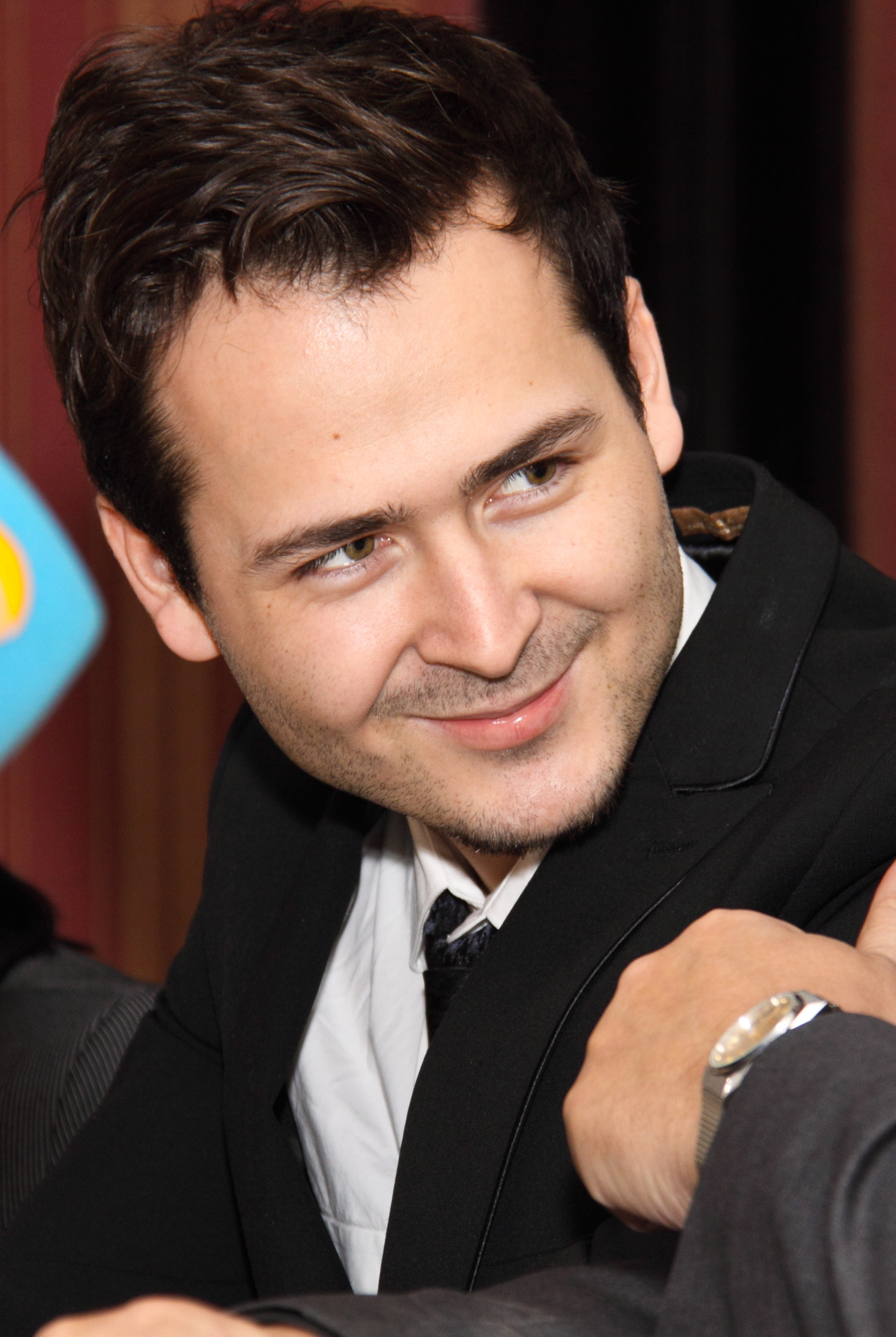
Inna (left), Alexandra Stan (middle) and Edward Maya (right) are among the most notable performers of popcorn music, having released the hit singles "Hot" (2008), "Mr. Saxobeat" (2010) and "Stereo Love" (2009).

Popcorn is a subgenre of dance music that originated in Romania in the late 2000s. It is inspired by Europop and dance-pop, featuring house and trance rhythms as well as fast tempos. The arrangement is characterized by the use of syncopated synthesizers played in staccato and brass. Instruments such as accordions were eventually also included in several popcorn songs, which were most commonly performed in English.

== History ==
In Romania, dance music started growing in popularity in the underground scene after the fall of the Ceaușescu communist regime in 1989. Since then, the Mamaia resort had established itself as a venue for international DJs. Romania's entry into the European Union in 2007 facilitated contact with international music for local musicians and songwriters. One of the earliest examples of popcorn music is the song "Sexy Thing" (2008) by David Deejay and Dony. It is featured on their 2010 studio album Popcorn, after which the genre is named.

Production trio Play & Win were also involved in the genre's development and worked on material for Akcent and Inna, among others. The latter's song "Hot" (2008) experienced commercial success in Europe, and was included on her 2009 album of the same name, which featured several other successful popcorn songs. The genre eventually became mainstream internationally, with "Stereo Love" by Edward Maya and Vika Jigulina, and "Mr. Saxobeat" by Alexandra Stan notably developing into worldwide hit singles. At that time, popcorn music was one of the two main commercial music waves in Romania along with hip hop. Other notable artists include Morandi, Deepside Deejays, Nick Kamarera, DJ Sava and Raluka.

== See also ==
- Music of Romania
