= Inna =

Romanian singer and songwriter (born 1986)

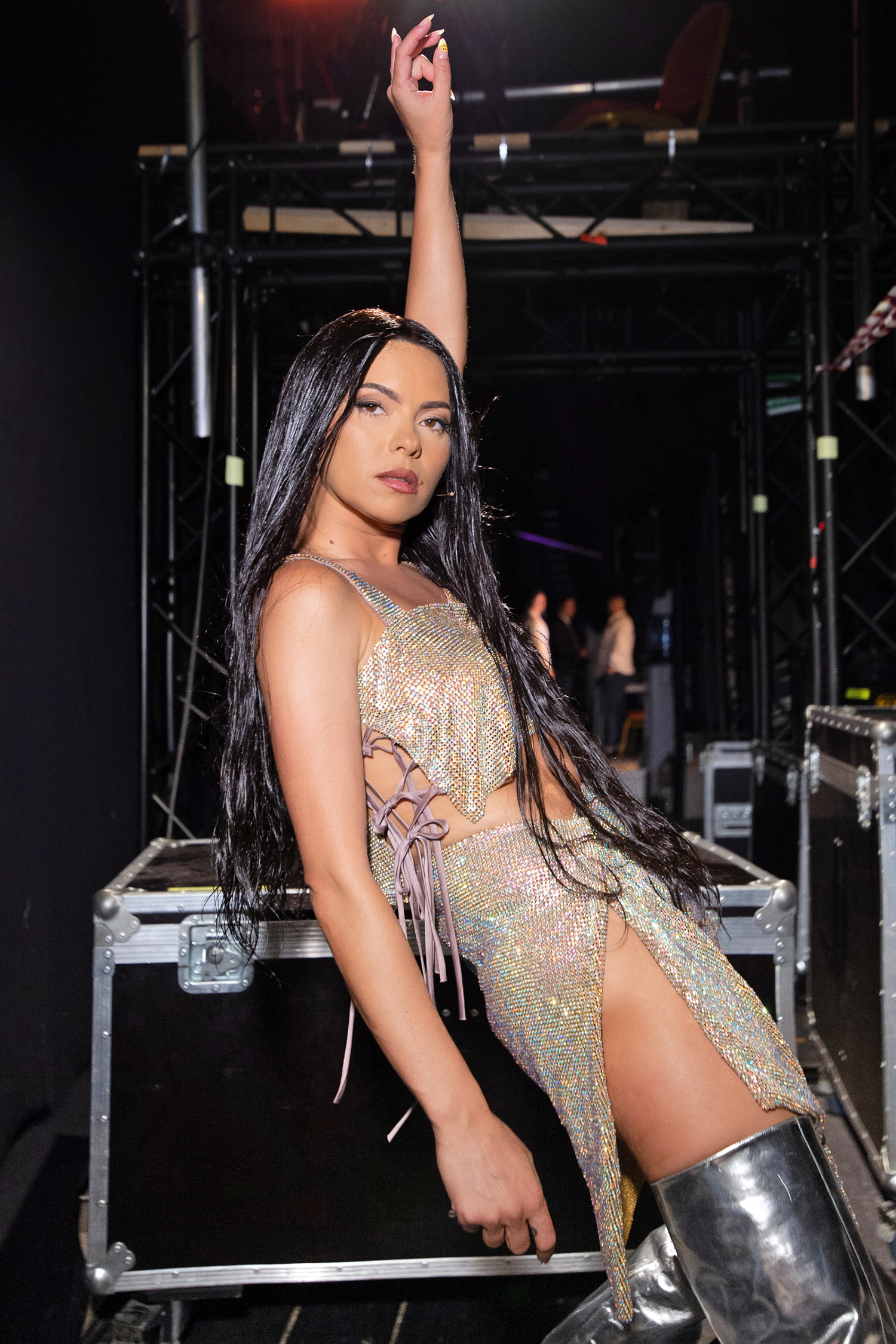
- Inna on the set of Masked Singer România in 2021
- Born: Elena Alexandra Apostoleanu; 16 October 1986 (age 40); Mangalia, Romania
- Education: Ovidius University
- Occupations: Singer; songwriter
- Years active: 2008–present
- Works: Discography
- Partner(s): Deliric (2020–present; engaged)
- Musical career
- Genres: Popcorn; EDM; house
- Labels: Roton; Warner; Global; Universal; Roc Nation
- Website: innaofficial.com

Logo
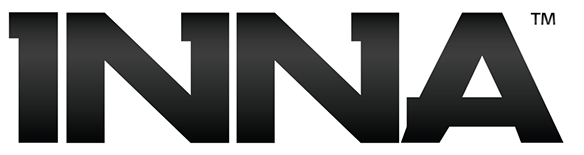

Elena Alexandra Apostoleanu (born 16 October 1986), known professionally as Inna (stylized in all caps), is a Romanian singer and songwriter. Born in Mangalia and raised in Neptun, she studied political science at Ovidius University before meeting the Romanian trio Play & Win and pursuing a music career. She adopted the stage name "Alessandra" and a pop-rock style in 2008; later that year, she changed her stage name to "Inna" and began releasing EDM, house and popcorn music. "Hot" (2008), her debut single, was a commercial success worldwide and topped the Romanian and Billboard's Hot Dance Airplay chart, among others. Her debut studio album of the same name followed in August 2009 and was certified Gold and Platinum. It featured several other successful singles in Europe, including "Amazing" (2009), the singer's second number-one single in Romania.

Inna's second album, I Am the Club Rocker (2011), yielded global success for the single "Sun Is Up" (2010). The track won the Eurodanceweb Award, making Inna the first and only Romanian artist to win the award. In 2011, it was announced Inna was the highest-paid Romanian and Eastern European artist. Her follow-up studio album, Party Never Ends (2013), was nominated for two consecutive years for Best Album at the Romanian Music Awards and reached the top ten in Mexico. It featured "More than Friends", a moderate European hit in collaboration with Daddy Yankee. In 2014, Inna signed with Atlantic Records and released the commercially successful "Cola Song" with J Balvin, which was used to promote that year's FIFA World Cup.

Inna's fourth and eponymous studio album was released in October 2015 and included "Diggy Down", her third number-one single in Romania. Beginning in 2017, Inna has been a coach on the talent show Vocea României Junior alongside Andra and Marius Moga. In the same year, she also released her fifth album Nirvana, whose singles found chart success in European countries such as Romania and Turkey. She signed a record deal with Roc Nation in 2018 to release her sixth studio album Yo in May 2019. Entirely envisioned by Inna, the Spanish-language effort marks a change in direction for her, as she approaches experimental and gypsy-influenced music styles. Her first single outside the Yo era, "Bebe", reached number one in Romania in March 2020. The singer also attained success in various Eastern European territories with "Flashbacks" (2021) and "Up" (2021), with the former being the lead single from her seventh studio album, Heartbreaker, released in November 2020. Inna's eighth record, Champagne Problems, followed as a two-part release in January and March 2022.

With global album sales of four million copies from her first three studio albums, Inna is the best-selling Romanian artist. She has received several awards and nominations, including the Balkan Music Awards, European Border Breakers Award, MTV Europe Music Awards and the Romanian Music Awards. Inna is a human rights activist, participating in campaigns against domestic violence and in support of children's rights.

== Life and career ==
=== 1986–2007: Early life and career beginnings ===
Elena Alexandra Apostoleanu was born on 16 October 1986 in Mangalia, Romania, to Giorgic and Maria Apostoleanu. She was raised in Neptun, where her father worked as a sea rescuer and her mother as a dancer and singer. As a child, Inna competed as a swimmer and became interested in football and basketball as well as music. She listened to a variety of musical styles as a teenager, including electro house and europop, and to artists such as Celine Dion, Beyoncé, Christina Aguilera and Whitney Houston. Inna attended the sole, now dissolved, elementary school in Neptun. Following this, the singer enrolled at Colegiul Economic (Economy College) in Mangalia, later studying political science at Ovidius University in Constanța. She also took singing lessons and participated in music festivals. An early foray into the music industry was an unsuccessful audition for the Romanian band A.S.I.A.

When Inna worked in an office, her manager heard her singing and contacted the production team Play & Win with whom she recorded several songs. Adopting the stage name Alessandra in 2008, she entered "Goodbye" and "Sorry" to represent Romania at the Eurovision Song Contest 2008; neither was selected. The singer performed "Goodbye" live on the primetime TV show, Teo!, her first televised appearance. Later that year, she changed her stage name to Inna since it was easy to memorize and was the name her grandfather called her when she was young. Early in her career, Inna released pop-rock songs, but switched to "commercial" minimal-infused house music after changing her stage name. In a News of the World interview, Inna cited Swedish House Mafia, the Black Eyed Peas and Jessie J as inspirations. Others include Pink, Houston and Dion.

=== 2008–2011: Hot and I Am the Club Rocker ===
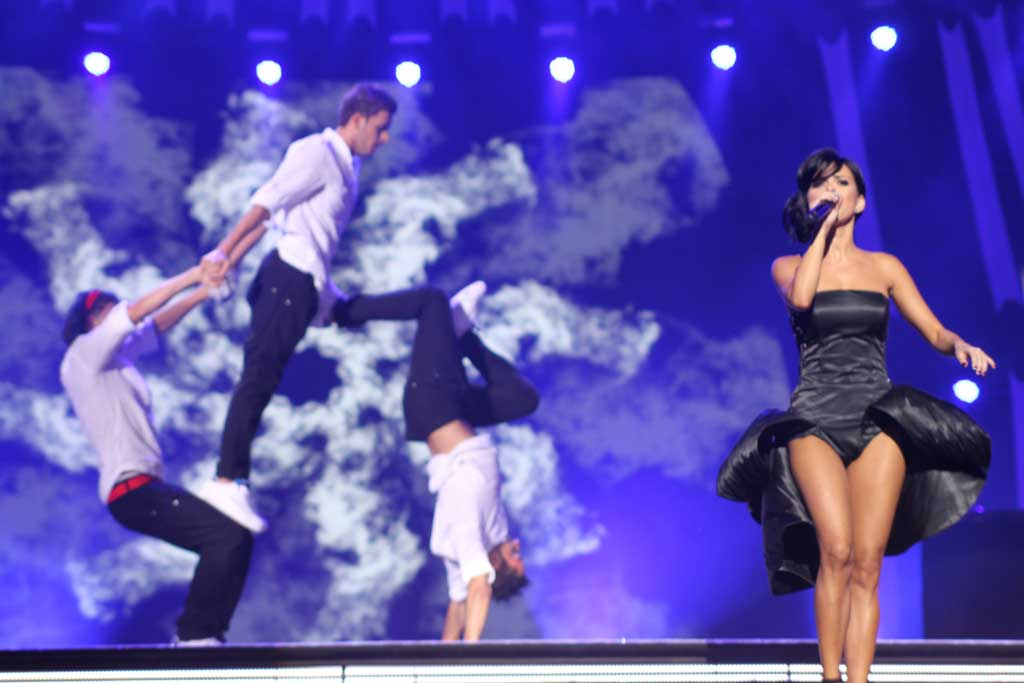
Inna at the Sopot Hit Festival in August 2009

Inna's debut single, "Hot", was sent to Romanian radio stations in August 2008. It topped the Romanian charts that winter, prompting her to be booked at Romanian nightclubs. The track was also commercially successful throughout Europe, and topped Billboard's Hot Dance Airplay chart in early 2010. It was part of a broader movement in which several Romanian popcorn songs would experience success internationally, promopting the genre to become mainstream. "Love" (2009) was released as Inna's second single, reaching number four in Romania. The singer received the first nominations of her career at the 2009 Eska Music Awards in Poland for "Hot". Her Romanian label, Roton, signed a contract with the American label Ultra Records in April 2009.

Inna collaborated with Romanian musician Bogdan Croitoru on her follow-up single, "Déjà Vu" (2009), which they released under pseudonyms (Bob Taylor and Anni) before revealing their true identities after a period of speculation. The single was as commercially successful as its predecessors. Inna had her second number-one hit in Romania with "Amazing", her fourth single, in 2009. The song was originally written by Play & Win for Romanian singer Anca Badiu, who later complained they had "stolen" it. Inna's debut studio album, Hot, was released in August 2009 and also included the last single "10 Minutes" (2010). The record was commercially successful and was certified Gold in Romania and Platinum in France. As of December 2011, it had sold 500,000 copies worldwide. Inna was the Best Romanian Act at the 2009 and 2010 MTV Europe Music Awards, the first Romanian artist to win the award in two consecutive years. In 2010, she was also nominated for Best European Act.

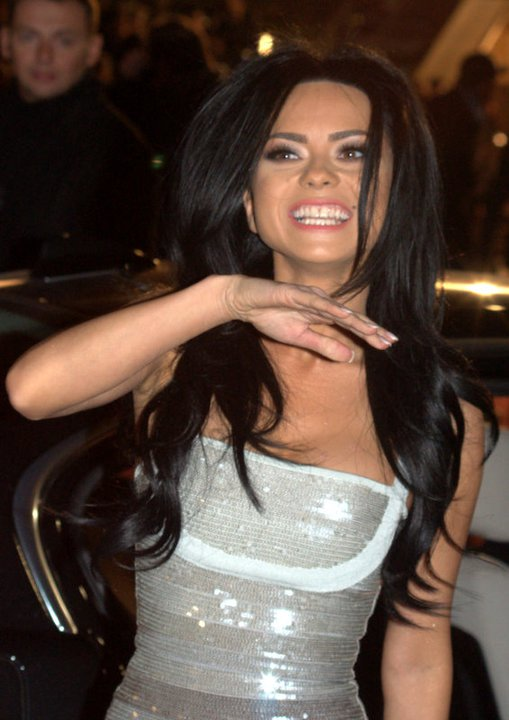
Inna at the 2011 NRJ Music Awards

Inna's sixth single, "Sun Is Up", was released in October 2010 and peaked at number two on the Romanian Top 100. It did well in several other European countries, earning Gold in Switzerland and Italy and Silver in the United Kingdom. "Sun Is Up" won the Eurodanceweb Award in 2010, the first time Romania had won the award. That year, Inna also received a career award at the Zece Pentru România Awards. She released her second studio album, I Am the Club Rocker, in September 2011, which also included the single "Club Rocker" that received a remix with American rapper Flo Rida. Featuring europop, dance-pop, techno and house music, the record was honored as one of the year's best albums by her label Roton and was certified Gold in Poland. The album was promoted by the I Am the Club Rocker Tour (2011–12) of Europe and the United States. During Mexican dates, Inna did several interviews and radio appearances. She had her first major Romanian concert at the Arenele Romane (Roman Arena) in Bucharest, where she arrived by helicopter "like a diva".

Titled "Club Rocker" (2011), the second single from I Am the Club Rocker was moderately successful. It was the subject of a lawsuit when Spanish singer Robert Ramirez sued Play & Win for copying the refrain of his song, "A Minute of Life"; Play & Win won the court case in 2018. Three subsequent singles, "Un Momento" (2011), "Endless" (2011) and "Wow" (2012), were released from the album. "Endless" peaked at number five on the Romanian Top 100, while "Wow" reached the top ten. According to Libertatea, Inna became the highest-paid Romanian and Eastern European artist in 2011.

=== 2012–2016: Party Never Ends and Inna ===
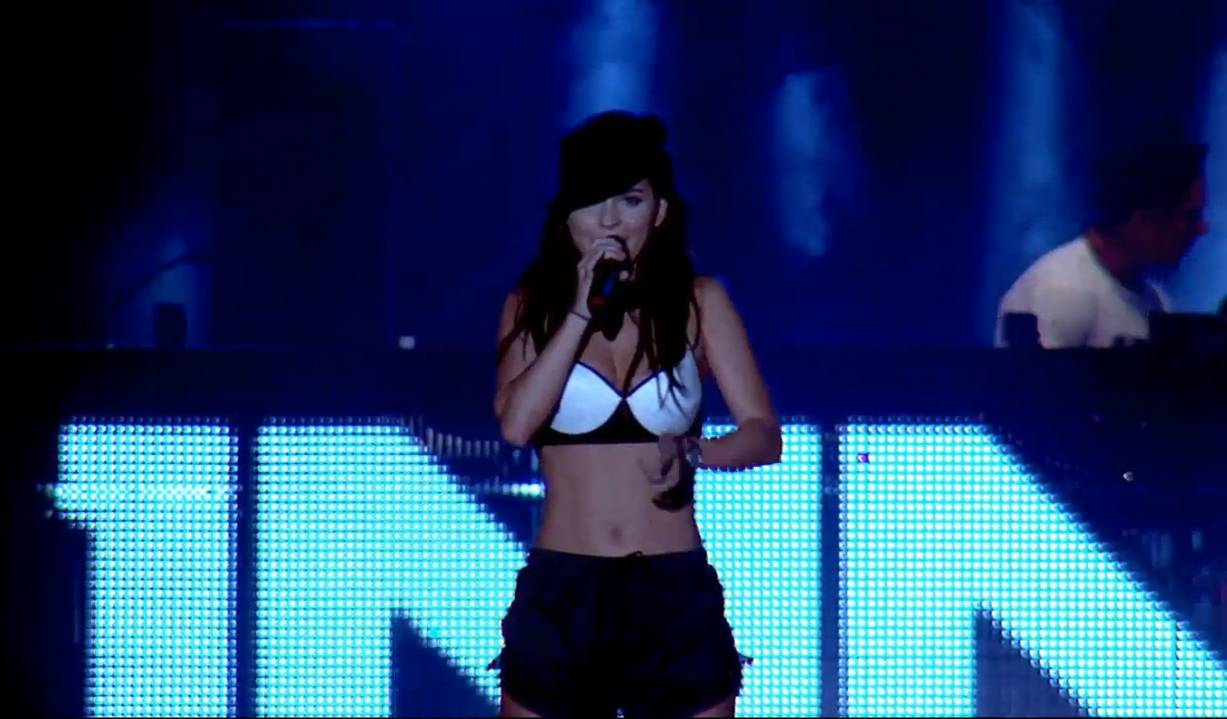
Inna during the Barbarella 2013 festival

Televiziunea Română (TVR) approached Inna in early 2012 to represent Romania at the Eurovision Song Contest 2012, but she turned the offer down due to scheduling conflicts. In the same year, she released the single "Caliente", which she dedicated to her Mexican fans, and "Tu și eu", which received heavy airplay in Romania and peaked at number five there. This was followed by another top ten hit, "Inndia" (2012). On New Year's Eve, Inna presented a concert at Meydan Racecourse in Dubai.

She released her third studio album, Party Never Ends, in March 2013, featuring the commercially successful singles "More than Friends" (2013) with Daddy Yankee and "In Your Eyes" (2013) with Yandel. "More than Friends" was controversial, since its writers were accused of plagiarizing Pitbull, Akon and David Rush's "Everybody Fucks" (2012). Party Never Ends peaked at number ten in Mexico, and was nominated for Best Album at the 2013 and 2014 Romanian Music Awards. In March 2013, Inna was the guest singer on "P.O.H.U.I." by the Moldovan music project Carla's Dreams, which reached number three in Romania. In late 2013, Inna contributed to Pitbull's "All the Things" on his EP, Meltdown.

"Cola Song", a collaboration with J Balvin released under Atlantic Records in April 2014, was successful in Europe, and was certified Platinum by Productores de Música de España (PROMUSICAE). It promoted the 2014 FIFA World Cup, and was used in the dance video game Just Dance 2017. In 2014, Inna collaborated a second time with Pitbull on "Good Time", and was featured on Romanian rapper Puya's "Strigă!", which peaked at number two in Romania. She released her fourth, eponymous studio album in October 2015. Another version of the album, Body and the Sun, was released in Japan in July 2015. One of the singles released from the record was "Diggy Down" (2014), her third number-one hit in Romania. Based on airplay, it won the Best Dance award at the Media Music Awards. Inna's next single, "Bop Bop" (2015), peaked at number two in Romania, and "Rendez Vous" (2016) was certified Gold in Poland. Also in 2015, Inna was the Best Romanian Act and was nominated for Best European Act at the MTV Europe Music Awards. Alexandra Stan's "We Wanna", with Inna and Daddy Yankee, was a moderate hit. Inna also contributed uncredited vocals to Carla's Dreams "Te rog", which went on to reach number one in Romania.

=== 2016–2021: Nirvana, Yo and Heartbreaker ===
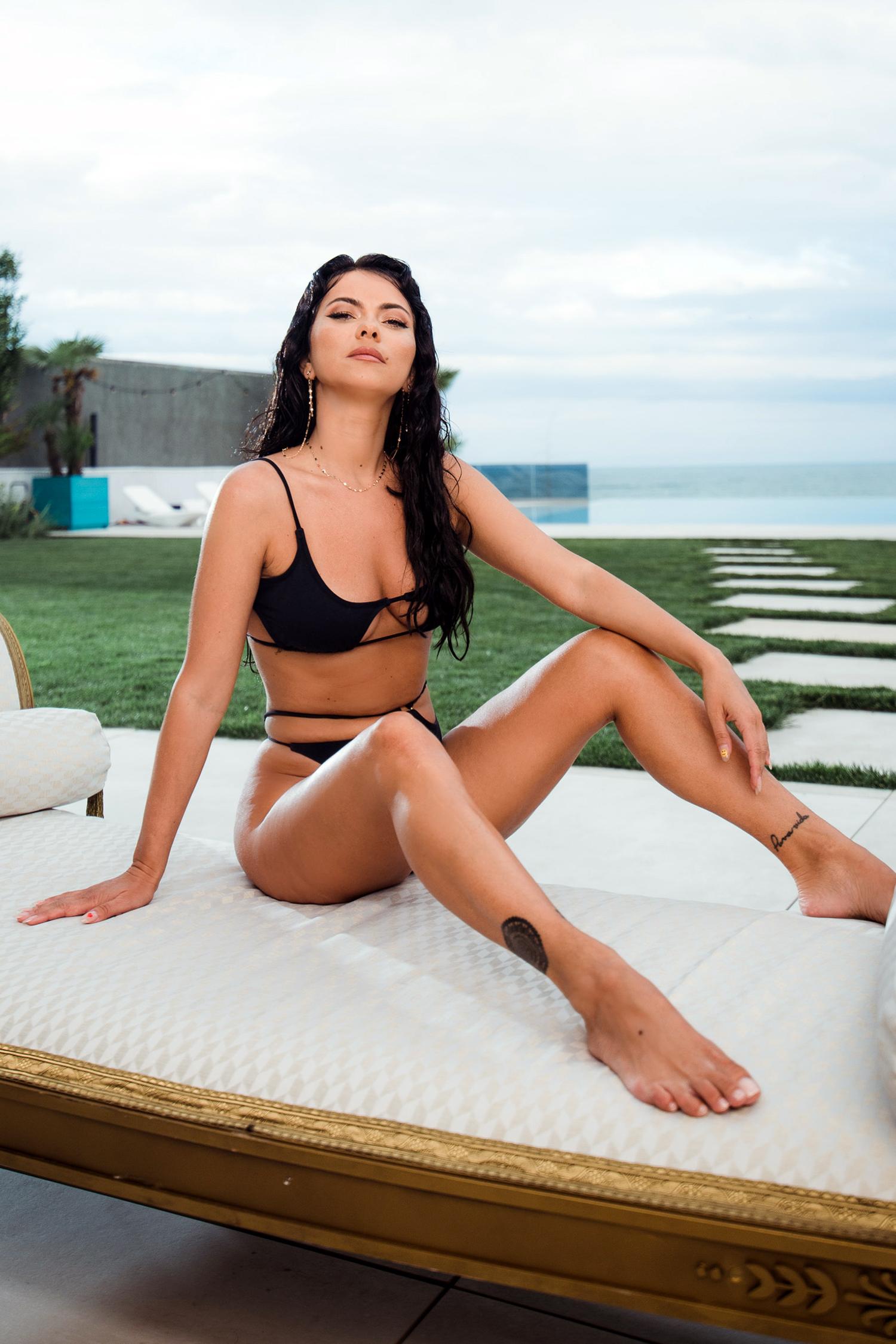
Inna in 2021, shooting the video for "Papa"

In August 2016, Inna was the opening act at the Untold Festival. She also became a member of the supergroup G Girls, with whom she released two singles ("Call the Police" and "Milk and Honey"). In early 2017, Inna was announced as a coach on Vocea României Junior with Andra and Marius Moga, and in the May of the same year her YouTube channel surpassed two billion total views. The singer's fifth studio album, Nirvana, was released in December 2017. Singles featured on the record included "Gimme Gimme" (2017), "Ruleta" (2017) and "Nirvana" (2017), which attained commercial success in several European countries including Romania and Turkey. "Ruleta" and "Nirvana" peaked at numbers three and two in her native country, respectively. Another pair of top ten singles in Romania, "Nota de plată" and "Pentru că", followed in late 2017 and 2018 with Moldovan group the Motans.

Inna released her sixth studio album, Yo, in May 2019. Containing songs written solely in Spanish, Inna took entire creative control over the record and worked extensively with Romanian producer David Ciente. She described Yo's material as experimental and gypsy-influenced, a departure from her previous work. "Ra" was released as the record's lead single in September 2018. It was promoted by several public appearances in Mexico and the United States—including the 2018 Telehit Awards and 19th Annual Latin Grammy Awards—as well as by Inna's inclusion in magazines such as Rolling Stone and Vogue México y Latinoamérica. The singer also signed a record deal with Jay-Z's record label Roc Nation. "Iguana", her follow-up single, went on to reach number four in Romania. In August, Inna launched her digital magazine titled InnaMag.

The non-album release "Bebe" with Ugandan artist Vinka peaked at number one on the native Airplay 100 in March 2020, and was the first in a string of singles that sonically returned to a more EDM sound but also encompassed deep house influences. As of 2020, Inna has been a juror for Pro TV's The Masked Singer Romania show. The singer released her seventh studio album, Heartbreaker, on 27 November 2020, which she created during a three-week period with Romanian songwriters and producers such as Sebastian Barac, Marcel Botezan, Ciente and Alexandru Cotoi at a mansion from which she uploaded daily YouTube vlogs to document the progress made; the vlogs constituted the first season of Inna's Dance Queen's House series. In January 2021, Inna's single "Read My Lips" (2020) featuring Colombian singer Farina reached number ten in Romania, and by May, Heartbreaker's lead single "Flashbacks" had peaked at number one in Russia and within the top ten in Romania, Ukraine, Bulgaria and the Commonwealth of Independent States. "Cool Me Down" with Gromee, and "It Don't Matter" with Alok and Sofi Tukker also became hits in selected territories. Inna participated as Alok's special guest at the Untold Festival in September 2021, held at Cluj Arena.

=== 2021–present: Champagne Problems, Just Dance and El Pasado ===
In October 2021, Inna released the non-album single "Up", whose chart success in countries such as Bulgaria, Poland and Russia peaked in early 2022. The track, eventually receiving a remix with Jamaican rapper Sean Paul, also became Inna's fifth number-one in Romania, topping Uniunea Producătorilor de Fonograme din România's (UPFR) airplay ranking. Champagne Problems, the singer's eighth studio album, was issued in two parts in January and March 2022, as the result of the second season of Dance Queen's House. In June 2022, Inna's single "Tare" with the Motans reached the summit of the Romanian airplay chart. Her ninth studio album, Just Dance, was released in 2023 in two parts.

On 10 April 2025, "Echo", a collaboration with singer Babasha, was released.

== Philanthropy and awards ==
In late November 2011, Inna joined the anti-domestic violence campaign Durerea nu este iubire (Pain is Not Love) empowering women to stand up to abuse, and signed a petition asking the Romanian government to strengthen a domestic violence law. An activist for children's rights in Romania, she endorsed the 2012 UNICEF No More Invisible Children campaign. Inna began the Bring the Sun Into My Life campaign to increase public awareness of violence against women. She also recorded "Tu tens la força" ("You Have the Power"), a Catalan language cover version of Gala's "Freed from Desire" (1996), for the 2015 Marató de TV3 telethon. Inna participated in Cartoon Network Romania's anti-bullying CN Clubul Prieteniei (CN Friendship Club) in 2016, and recorded a new opening theme for the Romanian-language version of The Powerpuff Girls.

That year, she and other Romanian celebrities signed an open letter supporting the LGBT community in response to a Romanian Orthodox Church-backed action to amend the constitutional definition of a family. This had been criticized by Romanian and international human-rights groups as curtailing LGBT rights. In March 2022, Inna performed at the We Are One benefit concert in Bucharest, whose aim was to raise funds for Ukraine upon its 2022 invasion by Russia.

Inna was called "one of Romania's biggest exports" by The Guardian, based on her sales and popularity. She has also received a number of awards and nominations, including five Balkan Music Awards, a European Border Breakers Award, three MTV Europe Music Awards for Best Romanian Act and thirteen Romanian Music Awards. By March 2016, Inna had sold four million copies of her first three studio albums. In 2015, Antena 3 reported that Inna was Romania's best-selling artist abroad.

== Personal life ==
Inna dated her manager Lucian Ștefan for ten years until 2013. In the same year, she began a relationship with the American photographer John Perez, with whom she collaborated on several occasions. Inna began dating Romanian rapper Deliric in 2020. He proposed to her in January 2023.

As of March 2017, Inna resided with her mother and grandmother in a villa she bought in Bucharest. She also lives in Barcelona.

In May 2018, the singer was hospitalized after collapsing on an unstable stage during her tour in Turkey; the tour was not affected by the event.

Inna is multilingual, speaking Romanian, English, Spanish, "a little bit of French" and "a few words in Italian, Arabic, and Russian"; she added that it "help[s] connect easily to different countries and people. It's amazing how music brings us together."

Inna is an Eastern Orthodox Christian. While her parents did not actively raise her in a religious tradition, she discovered Christian music when on vacation with her grandparents. Before long, Inna was singing in her local church choir and attending church regularly. Asked what faith means to her today, she notes, "I learned from my grandparents the importance of praying to God, saying my prayers, believing, and reading the Bible."

Inna continues to affirm her Christian spiritual identity and belief in God's divine providence "that causes things to happen" and "empowers us to live our lives". She emphasised how "wonderful" her grandmother's faith and prayers are and their ongoing significance to her "after so many years". As recently as December 2025, she reflected: "Every day I thank God for everything He has given me and, in return, I try to do good — to help a puppy or an old man."

== Discography ==
Studio albums

- Hot (2009)
- I Am the Club Rocker (2011)
- Party Never Ends (2013)
- Inna (2015)
- Nirvana (2017)
- Yo (2019)
- Heartbreaker (2020)
- Champagne Problems (2022)
- Just Dance (2023)
- Everything or Nothing (2024)
- El Pasado (2024)

== See also ==
- List of music released by Romanian artists that has charted in major music markets
- List of certified albums in Romania
