= Déjà Vu (Bob Taylor and Inna song) =

- One of the various cover artworks used to commercialize "Déjà Vu" worldwide.

Single by Bob Taylor and Inna (Note: During its release process, "Déjà Vu" has been credited differently, including to "Bob Taylor feat. Inna" or to "Inna featuring Bob Taylor".)

from the album Hot
- Released: June 2009
- Genre: Dance
- Length: 3:27 (radio edit)
- Songwriter(s): Sebastian Barac; Radu Bolfea; Marcel Botezan
- Producer(s): Barac; Bolfea; Botezan

Inna singles chronology
"Love" (2009)	"Déjà Vu" (2009)	"Amazing" (2009)

"Déjà Vu" is a song by Romanian musician Bob Taylor and Romanian recording artist Inna for the latter's debut studio album, Hot (2009). Released in June 2009, it was written and produced by Sebastian Barac, Radu Bolfea and Marcel Botezan. Musically, the single is of the dance genre, and originally contained the vocals of Romanian singer Alessia. However, after a feud over compensation between Taylor and her, the song was handed to Inna, although the early version had already been released.

When premiering the new version of "Déjà Vu", Taylor and Inna opted for pseudonyms before revealing their identity later. In order to accompany the single, a music video was shot at a club in Neptun, Romania by Tom Boxer, and it initially did not feature Inna until another version of the visual showed footage of her in Turkey. Commercially, the recording experienced success in European countries, reaching the top ten of the charts in Greece, the Commonwealth of Independent States, France and Romania, among others. "Déjà Vu" was certified Gold by the Dutch Association of Producers and Importers of Image and Sound Carriers (NVPI) for selling over 10,000 copies in the Netherlands.

== Background and controversy ==
"Déjà Vu"
21–second sample of "Déjà Vu", a dance song initially recorded by singer Alessia before being handed to Inna.

Initially, a version of the song featuring the vocals of Romanian singer Alessia was released in early 2009, and drew comparisons to Inna's "Hot" (2008) at that time. The track was further credited to Bogdan Croitoru, also known as Fizz, which opted for the pseudonym of Bob Taylor. However, following a dispute over compensation, the artists decided to quit their collaboration and Alessia demanded her vocals to be replaced with others, although "Déjà Vu" had already experienced commercial success in Romania and had been heavily played in night clubs. Particularly, the track was handed to Inna to re-record. According to Alessia, whose voice is a semi-tone higher than Inna's, the latter had a disadvantage when re-recording the song as it was not in her tonality, and this could not be changed because the track was already finished.

The new version of the dance single with Inna's vocals was initially made available for consumption as credited to Bob Taylor and Anni (backwards to Inna), as the artists wanted to "stay in the shade" reportedly because "the Romanian audience has some bias". Following a time of speculation and controversy, the performers of the recording were finally revealed, with Inna writing on her website; "I consider that a good song can be promoted and listened to without knowing by whom it is composed or who interprets it. With the help of 'Déjà Vu', I have showed this thing and, look, again, you – the audience – had the biggest intake. I thank you and don't forget that you are the only ones that can make a hit out of a song."

== Music video ==
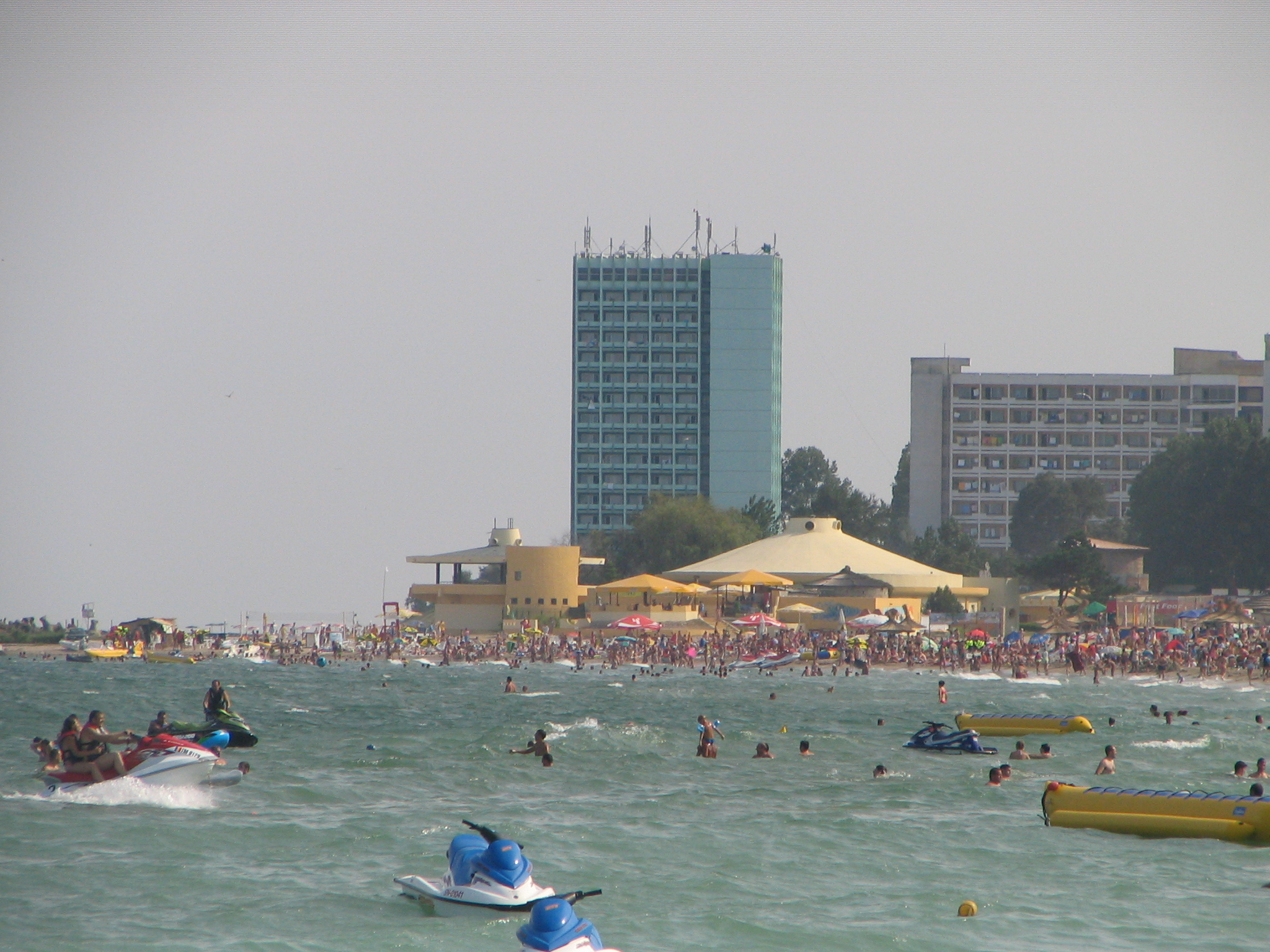
The music video for "Déjà Vu" was shot by Tom Boxer in a club in Neptun, Romania.

An accompanying music video for "Déjà Vu" was shot by Tom Boxer in a club in Neptun, Romania in June 2009. It was filmed in the period of Alessia's and Croitoru's argument over compensation, with Inna initially not appearing in it, before another version was released on 7 November 2009 incorporating footage of the singer in Turkey. The visual opens with a glass falling down in front of a black backdrop, with it breaking, and then sees Taylor mixing in a club. Following this, the focus alternates on female strippers and a group of partying people. Subsequently, a girl sporting an orange dress walks around the club, eventually drawing the attention of a male, with her sitting at the bar and watching a man mixing drinks. After the group of people—including masked men—further perform to the track, the clip ends with a shot of one's white T-shirt with an unknown blue figure on it. Scenes interspersed through the main clip portray Inna posing in swimsuit during a ship trip, footage of loudspeakers or two topless men fighting sporting yellow pants.

== Commercial performance ==
Upon its release, "Déjà Vu" experienced commercial success in Europe. On the native Nielsen Music Control chart, the song peaked at number six in September 2009, and further reached the top ten in various territories. While the recording achieved a peak position at number two in Greece, it charted at number four in the Commonwealth of Independent States, and in France it became Inna's third top ten single at number six. Additionally, on Spain's PROMUSICAE chart, "Déjà Vu" debuted at number 31 on 2 May 2010 and climbed to number 15 on 15 August 2010, lasting for 26 consecutive weeks. The song reached number 60 on the UK Singles Chart. In Austria, "Déjà Vu" debuted at number 25, scoring Inna's highest debut on the chart and her first top 40 entry there. A top ten hit in the Netherlands, the single was certified Gold by the Dutch Association of Producers and Importers of Image and Sound Carriers (NVPI) for selling over 10,000 copies in the country.

== Track listing ==
- Official versions and remixes (Note: This acts as a summary of all versions of the single found on its digital and physical releases.)
1. "Déjà Vu (Radio Edit)" – 3:27
2. "Déjà Vu (Play & Win Radio Edit Version)" – 4:24
3. "Déjà Vu (UK Radio Edit Version)" – 2:33
4. "Déjà Vu (Wideboys Stadium Radio Edit)" - 3:19
5. "Déjà Vu (Wideboys Stadium Club Remix)" - 5:58
6. "Déjà Vu (Wideboys Stadium Dub Remix)" - 5:59
7. "Déjà Vu (N-Force Radio Edit)" – 3:02
8. "Déjà Vu (N-Force Mix)" – 5:27

== Credits and personnel ==
Credits adapted from the liner notes of Hot.

- Bob Taylor – lead vocals
- Inna – lead vocals
- Sebastian Barac – producer, composer
- Radu Bolfea – producer, composer
- Marcel Botezan – producer, composer

== Charts ==
=== Weekly charts ===
Chart (2009–11)	Peak position
Austria (Ö3 Austria Top 40)	25
CIS (Tophit)	4
Belgium (Ultratop 50 Flanders)	15
Belgium (Ultratop 50 Wallonia)	10
Czech Republic (Rádio – Top 100)	16
European Hot 100 Singles (Billboard)	23
France (SNEP)	6
Greece Digital Songs (Billboard)	2
Hungary (Dance Top 40)	12
Netherlands (Dutch Top 40)	7
Netherlands (Single Top 100)	9
Poland (Dance Top 50)	24
Romania (Nielsen Music Control)	6
Russia Airplay (TopHit)	6
Slovakia (Rádio Top 100)	72
Spain (PROMUSICAE)	15
Switzerland (Schweizer Hitparade)	27
UK Singles (OCC)	60
UK Dance (OCC)	8

=== Year-end charts ===
Chart (2009)	Position
CIS (TopHit)	76
Hungary (Dance Top 40)	41
Russia Airplay (TopHit)	109
Chart (2010)	Position
Belgium (Ultratop 50 Flanders)	75
Belgium (Ultratop 50 Wallonia)	41
European Hot 100 Singles (Billboard)	100
France (SNEP)	99
France Airplay (SNEP)	72
Netherlands (Dutch Top 40)	39
Russia Airplay (TopHit)	188

== Certifications and sales ==
Region	Certification	Certified units/sales
Netherlands (NVPI)	Gold	10,000^{^}
^{^} Shipments figures based on certification alone.

== Release history ==
Region	Date	Format	Label
Romania	June 2009	Unknown	
Netherlands	11 November 2009	Digital download	Spinnin'
Netherlands	N/A 2009	CD single	Spinnin'
France	1 January 2010	Digital download	Roton
France	N/A 2010	CD single	Airplay/ Universal
Germany	1 January 2010	Digital EP	B1/ Universal
Spain	13 April 2010	Digital download	Vale
Italy	27 April 2010	Digital download	Roton
United Kingdom	14 November 2010	Promotional CD single	3 Beat

== See also ==
- List of music released by Romanian artists that has charted in major music markets
