= Hot (Inna album) =

- Cover of the original 2009 release of Hot. Various other artworks were designed to commercialize the album worldwide.

Studio album by Inna
- Released: 4 August 2009
- Recorded: Play & Win Studios (Constanța, Romania)
- Genres: EDM; popcorn
- Length: 44:05
- Language: English
- Label: Magic
- Producer: Play & Win

Inna chronology
Hot (2009)	I Am the Club Rocker (2011)

Singles from Hot
- 1. "Hot" Released: 12 August 2008; 2. "Love" Released: 16 February 2009; 3. "Déjà Vu" Released: 17 June 2009; 4. "Amazing" Released: 6 August 2009; 5. "10 Minutes" Released: 25 January 2010

Hot is the debut studio album by Romanian singer Inna, released on 4 August 2009 by Magic Records. Inna collaborated on the record with Romanian trio Play & Win, who entirely wrote, produced and arranged Hot at their Play & Win Studios in Constanța, Romania. It was described as an electronic dance music (EDM) album, with influences varying from trance, electro house and techno to Hi-NRG, synth-pop and chillout. Lyrically, Hot deals with love themes. Music critics gave the album positive to mixed reviews, praising the danceable style but criticizing its lack of innovation. At the 2010 Romanian Music Awards, Hot won in the Best Album category, while also receiving an award at the 2011 Radio România Actualităţi Awards in the Pop/Dance Album of the Year section.

As of December 2011, the record has sold 500,000 copies worldwide, with revenue amounting to €8 million from sales and accompanying concert tours. Commercially, it experienced success in Europe, peaking within the top 20 in multiple countries. Hot was also awarded Gold and Platinum certifications in Romania and France, respectively. It was aided by the release of five singles, "Hot" (2008), "Love" (2009), "Déjà Vu" (2009), "Amazing" (2009) and "10 Minutes" (2010), which achieved success on record charts. "Hot" and "Amazing" were both number ones in Romania. Inna performed over 200 concerts to promote the album.

== Background and release ==
As a child, Inna became interested in music, with her mother, grandmother and grandfather all singing as a hobby. She graduated the Colegiul Economic (Economy College) in Mangalia, later studying political science at Ovidius University in Constanţa. Inna also took singing lessons and participated in music festivals, while unsuccessfully auditioning for the Romanian band A.S.I.A. When Inna worked in an office, her manager heard her singing and contacted Play & Win. Adopting the stage name Alessandra in 2008, she adopted a pop-rock style, which switched to "commercial" minimal house music after changing her stage name to Inna.

Inna first announced working on her debut studio album in November 2008, and later confirmed its release in February 2009. Hot was ultimately released on 4 August 2009 by Magic Records, while premiering on 5 June 2011 in the United Kingdom through All Around the World Productions. An alternative version of the record, titled Very Hot, was made available in France on 22 November 2010 by Airplay Records. According to Cancan, Hot was sold with an average price of €10. It was entirely written, produced and mastered by Romanian trio Play & Win members Sebastian Barac, Radu Bolfea and Marcel Botezan at their Play & Win Studios in Constanța. Edward Aninaru was hired to shoot the accompanying cover artwork of Hot. In Romania, the album was released with five different cover sleeves to choose from.

== Composition ==
"Hot"
A 23-second sample of "Hot", an "unadulterated and stylised" trance-inspired electro house song.

Critical commentary has noted Hot as an EDM album, with Lewis Corner of Digital Spy pointing out "pumping Euro-beats and dainty synth chord progressions". The record opens with "Hot", an "unadulterated and stylised" trance-inspired electro house song, containing "ticky" synthesizer sounds similar to German band Boney M.'s "Ma Baker" (1977), and "trancey, hypnotic" beats. It is followed by "Love", a cadenced recording that belongs to the EDM and house genres, whose lyrics talk about "how complicated situations of love can become". Neeti Sarkar, writing for The Hindu, thought that the next track "Days Nights" was "rhetoric [...] [with] the singer plead[ing] in desperation for her man to return to her". "Amazing" is a techno song containing Spanish guitar and beats, while "Don't Let the Music Die" was described as influenced by Hi-NRG. It is followed by "On & On", with Sarker noting: "[It] is simple and tuneful, sometimes sounding like a poem with alternate lines rhyming"; a chillout mix is also included on Hot. "Déjà Vu", with Bob Taylor, was labelled as a dance track, while "10 Minutes" belongs to the synth-pop and electropop genres, stylized to fit the style of music consumed in the United States.

== Critical reception and accolades ==
Music critics gave mixed to positive reviews of Hot upon its release. Corner of Digital Spy thought that the album "does exactly what you would expect from the scantily clad Inna [...], there's no denying that the sound emanates summer warmth and memories of partying down the [insert Greek island here] strip, but little else is achieved." Corner further criticized album tracks "Fever", "Ladies" and "Left Right" as lacking innovation, while concluding: "Inoffensive if not a little uninspiring, Hot is a worthy soundtrack for this year's 18–30 clubbers, but even they might struggle to see this one out to the bitter end." Sarkar, writing for The Hindu, was more positive towards the record, saying: "Her debut album is a compilation of her numerous hit singles, making this record quite an entertaining listen, especially for the under 30 party goers". He went on to label "Fever" and "Ladies" as monotonous, but concluded: "When so many hit singles are put together on one record, there's no way the outcome can be bad". At the 2010 Romanian Music Awards, Inna won four out of six nominations, including in the Best Album category for Hot. The singer was also nominated for four awards at the 2011 Radio România Actualităţi Awards, including one win for Hot in the Pop/Dance Album of the Year category.

== Commercial performance ==
Hot experienced commercial success on European record charts. It first entered Poland's OLiS chart in August 2009 at number 28, which remained its peak position. In the Czech Republic (ČNS IFPI), the album opened and peaked at number seven in February 2010, spending a total of 17 non-consecutive weeks on the chart. Similar success was achieved on France's SNEP ranking, where Hot debuted and peaked at number nine in July 2010. In the United Kingdom, the album reached number 34 on the UK Albums Chart in June 2011, while simultaneously debuting at the top of the UK Dance Albums Chart and at number nine on the UK Album Downloads Chart. Hot moved 500,000 units worldwide as of December 2011; tabloid Cancan estimated Inna's resulting income at €5 million. A further €3 million came from over 200 supporting concerts with approximately €15,000 per date. As of March 2010, Hot had sold 20,000 copies in Poland, while being awarded Gold in Romania by the Uniunea Producătorilor de Fonograme din România (UPFR) and Platinum in France by the Syndicat National de l'Édition Phonographique (SNEP) for 10,000 and 100,000 copies sold, respectively.

== Singles ==
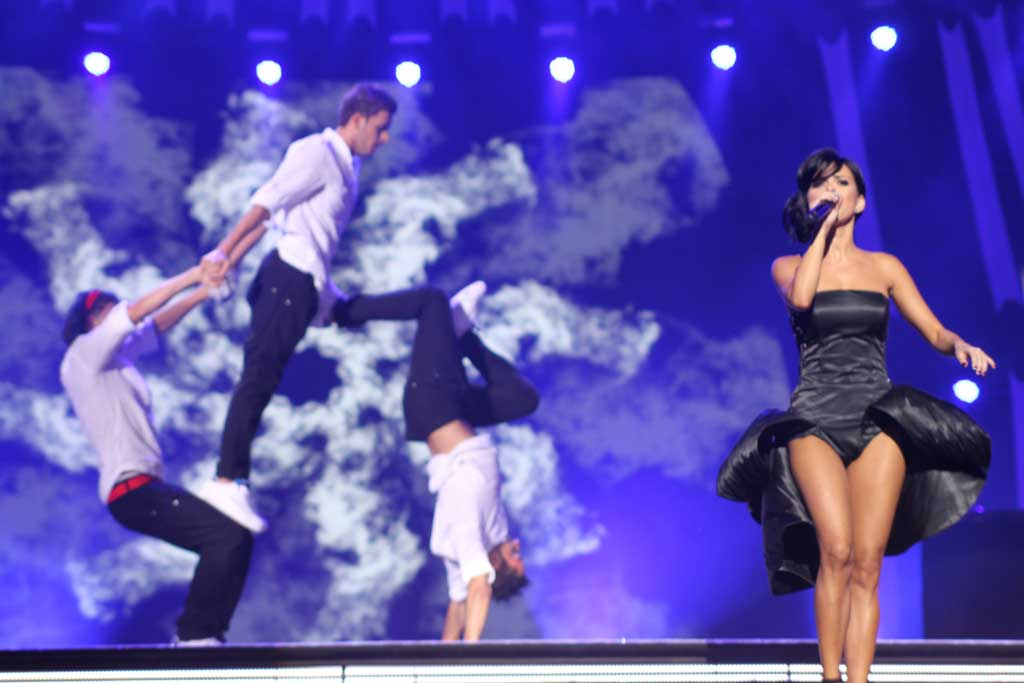
Inna performing "Hot" live at the Sopot Hit Festival in August 2009.

To support Hot, five singles were released, which according to Libertatea sold a total of 500,000 copies in France as of April 2011. Its title track was made available in August 2008, topping the native Nielsen Music Control chart, and reaching the top 20 in various other countries. "Hot" was certified Silver in the United Kingdom, Gold in Denmark and Italy, Platinum in Spain and multi-Platinum in Norway and Sweden. The follow-up single, "Love", was released in February 2009, to modest success in selected European countries. "Déjà Vu", the album's third single in collaboration with Bogdan Croitoru, caused controversy when the two artists used the pseudonyms of Anni and Bob Taylor. Their true identities were later revealed after a time of speculation. "Déjà Vu" reached the top 10 in Greece, Russia, France, the Netherlands, Romania and Wallonia. It was certified Gold in the Netherlands.

"Amazing" attracted controversy when it premiered in August 2009, with Romanian singer Anca Badiu revealing that it had been originally intended for her before released by Inna, and accusing Play & Win of breach of contract. "Amazing" achieved similar success to its predecessors, becoming her second number-one single in Romania. A last single, "10 Minutes", premiered in January 2010, and was added to later editions of Hot. The promotional single "I Need You for Christmas" (2009), and singles "Sun Is Up" (2010) and "Un Momento" (2011) were also featured on alternative versions of the album.

== Track listing ==
All songs written and produced by Play & Win.

Hot - 2009 Version
No.	Title	Length
1.	"Hot"	3:38
2.	"Love"	3:40
3.	"Days Nights"	3:23
4.	"Fever"	3:26
5.	"Left Right"	4:29
6.	"Amazing"	3:25
7.	"Don't Let the Music Die"	3:35
8.	"On & On"	4:39
9.	"Ladies"	5:08
10.	"Déjà Vu" (featuring Bob Taylor)	4:19
11.	"On & On" (Chillout Mix)	3:59
Total length:		43:43

Hot - 2010 International Version
No.	Title	Length
1.	"Hot"	3:38
2.	"10 Minutes"	3:20
3.	"Love"	3:40
4.	"Amazing"	3:25
5.	"Déjà Vu" (featuring Bob Taylor)	4:19
6.	"On & On"	4:39
7.	"Days Nights"	3:23
8.	"Fever"	3:26
9.	"Left Right"	4:29
10.	"Don't Let the Music Die"	3:35
11.	"Ladies"	5:08
12.	"On & On" (Chillout Mix)	3:59
Total length:		47:02

== Charts ==
=== Weekly charts ===
Weekly chart performance for Hot
Chart (2009–2011)	Peak position
Belgian Albums (Ultratop Flanders)	37
Belgian Albums (Ultratop Wallonia)	14
Czech Albums (ČNS IFPI)	7
Dutch Albums (Album Top 100)	68
European Top 100 Albums (Billboard)	64
French Albums (SNEP)	9
Hungarian Albums (MAHASZ)	19
Mexican Albums (Top 100 Mexico)	54
Polish Albums (OLiS)	28
Portuguese Albums (AFP)	27
Russian Albums (2M)	16
Scottish Albums (Official Charts)	39
Spanish Albums (Promusicae)	77
Swiss Albums (Schweizer Hitparade)	57
Swiss Romandy Albums (Media Control Romandy)	16
UK Albums (Official Charts)	32
UK Dance Albums (Official Charts)	1

2025 weekly chart performance for Hot
Chart (2025)	Peak position
Lithuanian Albums (AGATA)	43

=== Year-end charts ===
2010 year-end chart performance for Hot
Chart (2010)	Peak position
French Albums (SNEP)	86
Romanian Physical Albums (Diverta)	8

2025 year-end chart performance for Hot
Chart (2025)	Peak position
Hungarian Albums (MAHASZ)	88

== Certifications and sales ==
Certifications and sales for Hot
Region	Certification	Certified units/sales
France (SNEP)	Platinum	100,000^{*}
Poland	—	20,000
Romania	Gold	10,000
Summaries
Worldwide	—	500,000
^{*} Sales figures based on certification alone.

== Release history ==
Release dates for Hot
Region	Date	Format	Label
Poland	4 August 2009	Digital download	Magic
Russia	7 October 2009	CD	RDS
Italy	20 November 2009	Digital download	DIY
United States	8 December 2009	Digital download	Ultra
Czech Republic	22 February 2010	CD	Traxx
Spain	19 April 2010	Digital download	Roton
Spain	28 September 2010	CD	—N/a
Japan	19 April 2010	Digital download	Roton
South Africa	26 April 2010	CD	Just Music
Romania	March 2010	CD	Roton
Mexico	28 February 2011	Digital download	Mas Label/ Empo
United Kingdom	5 June 2011	CD	AATW
Australia	22 July 2011	CD	Central Station

== See also ==
- List of music released by Romanian artists that has charted in major music markets
- List of certified albums in Romania
