= Balkan Music Awards =

Annual music awards show

- Balkan Music Awards Logo
- Awarded for: Outstanding achievements for Balkan artists in the record industry.
- Country: Balkan
- First award: 2010
- Website: http://www.balkanmusicawards.com/

The Balkan Music Award is an annual Balkan music award show held every year in different cities of the Balkans. The first edition of the show was held on 16 May 2010 in Sofia, Bulgaria, where many famous and young Balkan artists were awarded. The show is organised and hosted by Balkanika Music Television.

== 2010 Balkan Music Awards ==
The Balkan Music Awards 2010 started in December 2009, where people voted online for the 2009 Balkan music.

- Best Female Performer in the Balkans 2009 – Hadise (from Turkey)
- Best Male Performer in the Balkans 2009 – Željko Joksimović (from Serbia)
- Best Duet/Group in the Balkans 2009 – Akcent (from Romania)
- Best Video in the Balkans 2009 - "Stin Pira" performed by Anna Vissi (from Greece)
- Award for exceptional contribution to the development and popularisation of the Balkan music - Anna Vissi (from Greece).

=== Results ===
The Results for "The Best Song in Balkans 2009" (The main prize)

Place	Country	Artist	Song	Points
1	Serbia	Željko Joksimović	"Ljubavi"	37
2	Albania	Flori Mumajesi	"Playback"	31
3	Romania	Akcent	"That's My Name"	23

== 2011 Balkan Music Awards ==
Balkan Music Awards of 2011 voting started in end of the March and ended on April 8.

There were "Worldwide Breakthrough Artist” that has been taken by Romanian singer Inna, "Balkan Project"

- Best Video: "Love in Brazil" by Andreea Banica (Romania)

=== Results ===
Place	Country	Artist	Song	Points
1	Albania	Aurela Gaçe	"Origjinale"	92
2	Romania	Inna	"Sun is Up "	90
3	Bulgaria	Alisia	"Tvoya Totalno"	89

== 2012 Balkan Music Awards ==
=== Awards ===
- Best Male Artist: Serdar Ortaç (Turkey)
- Best Female Artist: Inna (Romania)
- Best Group: MaNga (Turkey)
- Best Balkan Project: Teodora (Bulgaria) and Giorgos Giannias (Greece)
- The Results for The Best Song in Balkans 2012 (main prize)

Place	Country	Artist	Song	Points
1	Albania	Elvana Gjata	"Afer dhe larg"	89
2	Turkey	Sinan Akçıl feat. Hande Yener	"Atma"	84
3	Romania	Inna	"Endless"	76

=== Awards ===
- Best Duet/Group in the Balkans for 2011: Manga
- Best Balkan project for 2011: "Pitam te Posledno" by Emanuela (Bulgaria) feat. Serdar Otac (Turkey)
- Best Music Video in the Balkans for 2011: "Afer de Lagh" by Elvana Gjata (Albania)
- Best world breakthrough of a Balkan artist for 2011: Alexandra Stan (Romania)
- Best Male Artist in the Balkans for 2011: Serdar Otac (Turkey)
- Best Female Artist in the Balkans for 2011: Inna (Romania)

Country	Artist	Song
Albania	Elvana Gjata	"Afer dhe Larg"
Bosnia and Herzegovina	Dino Merlin	"Undo"
Bulgaria	Alisia	"Na ti mi Govori"
Greece	Elli Kokkinou	"Eroteftika"
Croatia	Severina	"Brad Pitt"
Kosovo	Rona Nishliu	"Suus"
Montenegro	Dado Polumenta, MC Yankoo, DJ Mladja, and MC Stojan	"Ja Volim Balkan"
North Macedonia	Karolina Gočeva ft. Vlatko Stefanovski	"Ne se Vrakaš"
Romania	Inna	"Endless"
Slovenia	Maja Keuc	"No One"
Serbia	Lepa Brena	Briši me
Turkey	Sinan Akçıl ft. Hande Yener	"Atma"
