= Hot (Inna song) =

2008 song by Inna

Single by Inna

from the album Hot
- Released: 12 August 2008
- Genre: Electro house; popcorn
- Length: 5:06
- Label: AATW; Kontor; Roton; Spinnin'; Ultra
- Songwriters: Sebastian Barac; Radu Bolfea; Marcel Botezan
- Producers: Barac; Bolfea; Botezan

Inna singles chronology
"Hot" (2008)	"Love" (2009)

"Hot" is the debut single by Romanian singer Inna, released on 12 August 2008. It is from her debut studio album of the same name (2009). The song was written and produced by Play & Win members Sebastian Barac, Radu Bolfea and Marcel Botezan. Musically, "Hot" is a trance-inspired electro house and popcorn song, with its instrumentation consisting of synthesizer sounds and trance beats. Throughout the track, the hook is repeated multiple times, and male vocals are used to complement Inna.

Music critics gave generally positive to mixed reviews of the recording, commending its simplicity, efficacy and dance nature, while criticizing the quality of its lyrics and calling the track innovation loose. One reviewer also compared "Hot" to the work of British rock band New Order and French disc jockey David Guetta. The song won in the Best Dance category at the 2009 Romanian Music Awards, while it was nominated for an Eska Music Award in the same year. Commercially, it became Inna's breakthrough single, topping the charts in Bulgaria, Romania and Spain and reaching the top 20 in multiple countries. Due to high sales, "Hot" was awarded Gold and Platinum certifications in Denmark, Italy, Norway, Spain, Sweden and the United Kingdom.

For promotion, two accompanying music videos—known as "True Love Edit" and "Dancing in the Dark Edit"—were shot by Florin Botea and released in 2008. The first clip portrays a female nightclub dancer receiving cards from a supposed admirer, who then turns out to be her partner, while the second was meant to emphasize Inna's image. The singer performed the track live multiple times, including at the 2009 Eska Music Awards, Sopot Hit Festival, MAD Video Music Awards and her own Inna: Live la Arenele Romane gig in Bucharest. Dutch DJ duo Blasterjaxx also notably remixed "Hot" for the 2016 Ultra Music Festival to positive response.

== Background and composition ==
"Hot"
A 21-second sample of "Hot", an "unadulterated and stylised" trance-inspired electro house and popcorn song. Its instrumentation consists of "ticky" synthesizer sounds along with "trancey, hypnotic" beats.

As a child Inna became interested in music, with her mother, grandmother and grandfather singing as a hobby. She attended the Colegiul Economic (Economy College) in Mangalia, later studying political science at Ovidius University in Constanța. Inna also took singing lessons and participated in music festivals, while unsuccessfully auditioning for the Romanian band A.S.I.A. When Inna worked in an office, her manager heard her singing and contacted Play & Win. Adopting the stage name Alessandra in 2008, she approached a pop-rock style, which switched to "commercial" minimal-infused house music after changing her stage name to Inna.

"Hot" was entirely written and produced by Play & Win members Sebastian Barac, Radu Bolfea and Marcel Botezan, and was released as the first single from Inna's debut studio album of the same name (2009). It was sent to Romanian radio station Vibe FM on 12 August 2008, where it was played for the first time during the radio programme Request 629. During an interview with Romanian website Music Pass, Inna stated: "[Play & Win] presented us 'Hot' [...] which I didn't like. It sounded weird and different from what I had learned from [my music teacher]. [...] It was a little strange, much more effects, [...] something like S.F." The track had been previously offered to Romanian singer Alessia to record, who however rejected it as it did not match her standards. On another occasion, Inna stated that the track emerged "out of fun" and that its success surprised her.

"Hot" has been described as an "unadulterated and stylised" trance-inspired electro house and popcorn song. Its hook: "Fly like you do it / Like you're high like you do it / Like you fly like do it / Like a woman" is repeated multiple times throughout the track. Male "la la la" vocals complement "Hot", which according to Paul Lester of The Guardian sound "as though a hunky waiter from the local beach cafe wandered into shot". BBC's Fraser McAlpine noticed that the singer "is clearly using the words to this song as a kind of percussion to break up the music", which contains "ticky" synthesizer sounds similar to German band Boney M.'s "Ma Baker" (1977), and "trancey, hypnotic" beats. The word "hot" is never mentioned throughout the single. According to Inna, its verses and refrain are interpretable, with her stating that the "Do it like a woman" lines were not meant to have a pornographic connotation. "Hot" was part of a broader movement in which several Romanian popcorn songs would experience success internationally, promopting the genre to become mainstream.

== Reception and accolades ==
Professional ratings
Review scores
Source	Rating
BBC	3/5 stars
Digital Spy	4/5 stars

Upon its release, "Hot" was generally met with mixed to positive reviews from music critics. Robert Copsey from Digital Spy, awarded it four out of five stars, and praised its simplicity and efficacy. He further wrote: "expect [it] to coax you onto the dancefloor next time you're out on the town and up for a strut." Lester, writing for The Guardian, compared the recording to the work of "Ibiza-era" British rock band New Order and French disc jockey David Guetta. Fans of the recording include British singer Ellie Goulding, who praised it in a Twitter post in November 2016. At the 2009 Romanian Music Awards, Inna won three nods for herself and an award in the Best Dance category for "Hot". The song was also nominated in the Best International Song category at the 2009 Eska Music Awards.

Neeti Sarkar of The Hindu thought that "Hot" had a "hypnotic rhythm" and "set[s] the dance floor on fire", although minorly criticizing its hook as repetitive. BBC's McAlpine awarded the track three out of five stars, praising its appeal and dance character. However, he negatively viewed the sense of its lyrics, comparing them to crosswords due to their lack of sense and jokingly stating that Inna was "more of a Sudoku girl". During an interview with Adevărul, Spanish musician Federico Albert criticized "Hot" as innovation loose, while noticing the lack of musical instruments. He concluded: "The computer once again makes the rules in this world of music."

== Commercial performance ==
Commercially, the song experienced widespread success on record charts. In native Romania, it topped the Nielsen Music Control chart in December 2008, while also managing to reach number one on Bulgaria's airplay chart, the Dance Top 40 chart in Hungary, Spain's PROMUSICAE chart, United Kingdom's UK Dance Chart and Billboard's Dance/Mix Show Airplay component chart in the United States. On the latter, it notably replaced American singer Kesha's "Tik Tok" (2009) at the top position. Other top 10 placements were achieved in countries including the Turkey, Netherlands, the Commonwealth of Independent States, Czech Republic, Hungary, France, the Flanders and Wallonia regions of Belgium,. In the United Kingdom, the song debuted on the UK Singles Chart at number eight in March 2010, climbing to its peak position at number six the next week. For exceeding 200,000 in digital units, "Hot" was certified Silver in the region by the British Phonographic Industry (BPI). The song was also awarded Gold in Denmark and Italy by the IFPI Denmark and Federazione Industria Musicale Italiana (FIMI), and at least Platinum in Norway, Spain and Sweden by the IFPI Norway, PROMUSICAE and Swedish Recording Industry Association (GLF).

== Music video ==
=== True Love Edit ===
The first music video for "Hot" was shot by Florin Botea on 20 October 2008 at the Gossip Club, Romania, in the span of 14 hours. During an interview with Romanian website Divercity Cafe, Inna recalled of the filming session: "I felt very good, there were pleasant and unpleasant happenings that I went through [...]. We [...] had fun, we tried to do our jobs as professionals [...]." The clip was exclusively premiered on Radio 21. It was known as the "True Love Edit" after its release on YouTube.

The clip begins with a young blonde woman doing her hair and make-up in a nightclub's back dressing room, where she works as a stage dancer. Her fellow co-workers and friends are then seen around her as she receives a card from a supposedly secret admirer. After doing her job as a dancer, the music video moves into a scene at the woman's home where she can be seen in a casual dress arguing with her partner in front of their young daughter. After the mother leaves, the father comforts his daughter, who seems to be upset about her parents arguing. Subsequently, the child falls to sleep and the clip shifts back to the nightclub scene where the woman is crowded around again by her friends because of the roses and card she received from her secret admirer before going back to the stage that night. Whilst she is stage dancing, her secret admirer is shadowed but visible in the crowd at the nightclub. The woman then arrives home the next morning to pack her bags and to leave the house. Towards the end of the video, she manages to find her secret admirer who then takes his sunglasses off and turns out to be her lover who she had been fighting with. The visual ends with them hugging, as well as Inna and Play & Win standing together up against a white wall before they walk away together. Interspersed scenes during the main plot show Inna performing to the song while wearing two different looks; the first look sees her having long hair, dressed in a white blouse with grey tones, while the second one portrays her wearing a strapless grey dress and having her hair tied up.

=== Dancing in the Dark Edit ===
A second music video for "Hot" was premiered on 19 December 2008, and was also filmed by Botea. It was known as the "Dancing in the Dark Edit" during its release on YouTube. Regarding the decision to shoot a second video, Inna stated: "After [the first visual] appeared on YouTube, the comments were not the ones we were expecting. So we decided to shoot it again." During a 2013 Adevărul interview with Botea, he said that he regrets filming two music videos for the song, labelling them as "unsatisfying".

The clip emphasizes Inna's image and begins with a round red speaker backed in red lighting visible onscreen, which is then used as a substitute for the letter "o" in the song's title. In Inna's first scene, she has straightened loose hair, wearing a butterfly-like necklace, a beige short dress and a dark-coloured bracelet. The video then moves to a nightclub where a disc jockey performs in front of a dancing crowd. Following this, Inna is presented singing into a microphone built-in from the ceiling next to the round red speaker. She sports a long, fluttered grey dress which is blown up and down during the scene by special wind effects. Additionally, the singer wears grey-coloured make-up and eyelash extensions. In Inna's final scene, she has her hair tied-back and wears a tight black vintage pants over a white sleeveless top. Three of the main dancers come together for a routine dance before the clip ends with Inna and Play & Win standing next to each other.

== Live performances and other usage ==
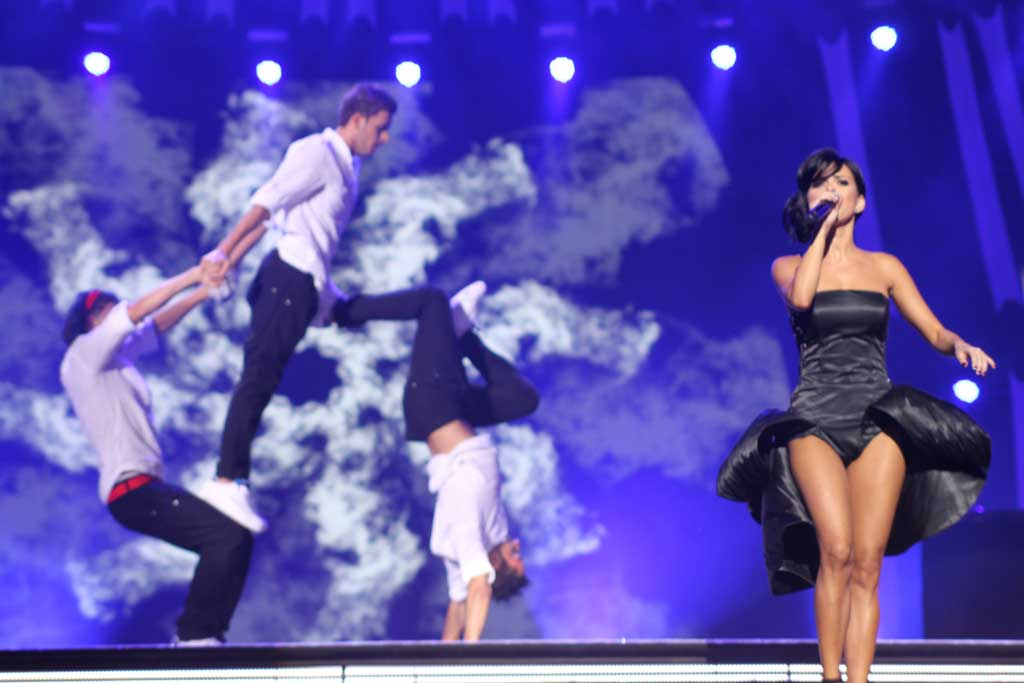
Inna performing "Hot" live at the Sopot Hit Festival in August 2009.

Following the release of "Hot", Inna was booked at several Romanian nightclubs to perform the song in November 2008. In 2009, Inna notably sang the track at the Eska Music Awards on 13 March, Sopot Hit Festival in Poland in August sporting a dress designed by Lena Criveanu, Loop Live in Bulgaria on 11 October, and Legendario Ice Experience in Spain. In 2010, Inna performed "Hot" at the MAD Video Music Awards in Greece on 24 June, and Starfloor in France on 23 October. The second appearance was controversial for the exposure of one of her nipples. "Hot" was also included on the singer's Inna: Live la Arenele Romane gig in Bucharest on 17 May 2011, where she arrived by helicopter.

Romanian band Blue Nipple Boy recorded a cover of the song in 2013. For the 2016 Ultra Music Festival, Dutch DJ duo Blasterjaxx remixed "Hot" and released their version — "Hot 2016" — for free download. Inna's vocals are used during the track's break parts, complemented by "fat" chords. Following a drop, the refrain is played, consisting of "fat" beats, a bassline and a "powerful lead sound". An editor of Dance-Charts praised the remix and positively noticed the contrast between the singer's "smooth" voice and the production. He concluded: "It may well be one of the year's most unusual collaborations in the big room EDM genre."

== Track listings ==
- Official versions (Note: This acts as a summary of all versions of the single found on Hot and its digital and CD releases.)
1. "Hot (Radio Edit)" – 3:38
2. "Hot (US Radio Edit)" – 3:47
3. "Hot (Extended Mix)" – 5:06
4. "Hot (UK Radio Edit)" – 2:33
5. "Hot (Original Version)" – 4:02
6. "Hot (French Radio Edit Version)" – 2:52
7. "Hot (U.S. Short Radio Edit Version)" – 3:05
8. "Hot (U.S. Radio Edit Version)" – 3:45
9. "Hot (Riff & Rays Radio Edit)" – 2:59
10. "Hot (Riff & Rays Club Remix)" – 7:07
11. "Hot (Malibu Breeze Radio Edit)" – 3:42
12. "Hot (Malibu Breeze Club Remix)" – 6:52
13. "Hot (Cahill Radio Edit)" – 3:03
14. "Hot (Cahill Club Remix)" – 6:53
15. "Hot (Cahill Mixshow)" – 4:51
16. "Hot (Daz Bailey Vocal Remix)" – 7:25

15. "Hot (Daz Bailey Club Remix)" – 7:26
16. "Hot (Sgt Slick Club Remix)" – 5:54
17. "Hot (Sgt Slick Dub)" – 6:24
18. "Hot (The Real Booty Babes Radio Edit)" – 2:52
19. "Hot (The Real Booty Babes Club Remix)" – 4:33
20. "Hot (Samuele Sartini Radio Edit)" – 3:22
21. "Hot (Samuele Sartini Club Remix)" – 5:25
22. "Hot (Da Brozz Radio Edit)" – 3:39
23. "Hot (Da Brozz Club Remix)" – 5:18
24. "Hot (Hardforze Remix)" – 6:42
25. "Hot (Eric Chase Remix)" – 7:22
26. "Hot (Jerox's Walk In the Dusk Remix)" – 4:24
27. "Hot (RLS Radio Edit)" – 3:34
28. "Hot (RLS Long Club Remix)" – 6:33
29. "Hot (Castelli & Lyos vs. Donati & Amato Remix)" – 4:54
30. "Hot (2 Faced Funks Remix)" – 5:53

== Charts ==
=== Weekly charts ===
2008–2010 weekly chart performance for "Hot"
Chart (2008–2010)	Peak position
Belgium (Ultratop 50 Flanders)	6
Belgium (Ultratop 50 Wallonia)	6
Bulgaria (IFPI)	1
Canada Hot 100 (Billboard)	97
CIS Airplay (TopHit)	2
Czech Republic Airplay (ČNS IFPI)	3
Denmark (Tracklisten)	13
European Hot 100 Singles (Billboard)	10
Finland (Suomen virallinen lista)	14
France (SNEP)	6
Germany (GfK)	80
Global Dance Songs (Billboard)	6
Hungary (Dance Top 40)	1
Hungary (Rádiós Top 40)	4
Hungary (Single Top 40)	8
Ireland (IRMA)	39
Italy (FIMI)	33
Mexico Ingles Airplay (Billboard)	23
Netherlands (Dutch Top 40)	2
Netherlands (Single Top 100)	4
Norway (VG-lista)	14
Poland Dance (ZPAV)	37
Romania (Nielsen Music Control)	1
Russia Airplay (TopHit)	2
Scottish Singles Sales (Official Charts)	3
Slovakia Airplay (ČNS IFPI)	38
Spain (Promusicae)	1
Sweden (Sverigetopplistan)	14
Switzerland (Schweizer Hitparade)	17
Turkey (Billboard)	6
Ukraine Airplay (TopHit)	12
UK Singles (Official Charts)	6
UK Dance (Official Charts)	1
US Dance/Mix Show Airplay (Billboard)	1
US Hot Single Sales (Billboard)	50

=== Year-end charts ===
2009 year-end chart performance for "Hot"
Chart (2009)	Position
Belgium (Ultratop 50 Flanders)	75
Belgium (Ultratop 50 Wallonia)	76
CIS (TopHit)	6
Hungary (Dance Top 40)	2
Hungary (Rádiós Top 100)	18
Netherlands (Dutch Top 40)	21
Netherlands (Single Top 100)	22
Russia Airplay (TopHit)	4
Spain (PROMUSICAE)	15

2010 year-end chart performance for "Hot"
Chart (2010)	Position
Belgium (Ultratop 50 Flanders)	86
European Hot 100 Singles (Billboard)	46
France (SNEP)	29
Italy (FIMI)	87
Switzerland (Schweizer Hitparade)	58
UK Singles (OCC)	91
US Dance/Mix Show Airplay (Billboard)	3

=== Decade-end charts ===
Decade-end chart performance for "Hot"
Chart (2000–2009)	Position
Russia Airplay (TopHit)	51

== Certifications and sales ==
Certifications and sales for "Hot"
Region	Certification	Certified units/sales
Denmark (IFPI Danmark)	Gold	15,000^{^}
France	—	80,000
Italy (FIMI)	Gold	10,000^{*}
Norway (IFPI Norway)	3× Platinum	30,000^{*}
Spain (Promusicae)	Platinum	65,000
Sweden (GLF)	2× Platinum	40,000^{‡}
United Kingdom (BPI)	Silver	200,000^{*}
^{*} Sales figures based on certification alone.^{^} Shipments figures based on certification alone.^{‡} Sales+streaming figures based on certification alone.

== Release and radio history ==
Release dates and formats for "Hot"
Region	Date	Format	Label
Romania	12 August 2008	Radio airplay	—N/a
Spain	2 June 2009	Digital download	Vale
United States	21 July 2009	Digital download	Ultra
Germany	20 August 2009	CD single	Kontor
Germany	27 November 2009	Digital download	Roton
Netherlands	20 August 2009	CD single	Spinnin'
Italy	20 November 2009	Digital download	DIY
Italy	N/A 2009	CD single	DIY
United Kingdom	5 April 2010	CD single	AATW
France	N/A 2010	CD single	Airplay

== See also ==
- List of music released by Romanian artists that has charted in major music markets
- List of Romanian Top 100 number ones
- List of Spanish number-one hits of 2009
- List of number-one dance hits of 2010 (UK)
- List of number-one dance airplay hits of 2010 (U.S.)
