= Bulgarian Association of Music Producers =

The Bulgarian Association of Music Producers (or BAMP; Bulgarian: Българска асоциация на музикалните продуценти) tracks the success of music compositions on Bulgarian airplay, and it is a non-profit organization that controls music production companies in that country. Founded in 1996, it defends the rights of producers and distributors of popular music. According to their official website, the main focus of their association is: "to assist the competent authorities in organizing and coordinating activities related to the fight against music piracy." In 1999, it gained recognition as a national group of the International Federation of the Phonographic Industry (IFPI), which advocates record companies worldwide. They track charted music both from Bulgarian artists and international acts using Nielson SoundScan.

BAMP is the body certifying music recordings in Bulgaria. As of 2025, gold status is awarded for sales of 1,000 units, while platinum is awarded for 2,000. These number includes physical sales and digital downloads, but do not include streaming.
