= Play & Win =

Romanian music producers

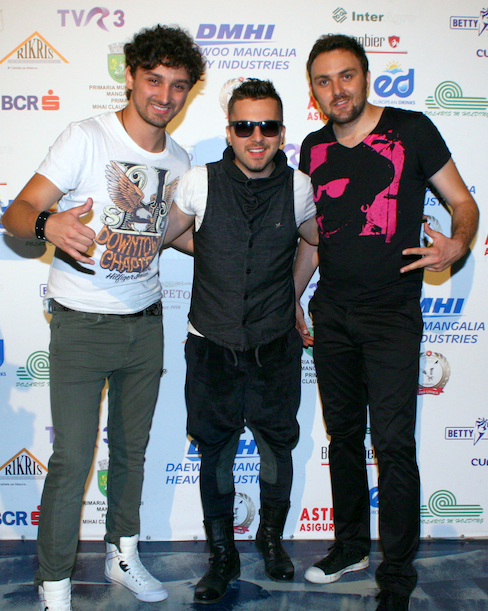

Background information
- Origin: Alba Iulia, Romania
- Genres: Popcorn; EDM; house; Europop; pop
- Occupations: Music producers; songwriters
- Years active: 2000–present
- Members: Radu Bolfea
- Past members: Marcel Botezan; Sebastian Barac

Play & Win is a Romanian songwriting and music production project that was formed as a trio in 2008 by Radu Bolfea, Marcel Botezan and Sebastian Barac. It became a solo project by Bolfea after Botezan and Barac left and formed Marco & Seba in 2013. The production team have more than 500 songs to their credit registered at the PRS. As Play & Win, they have been produced some of Romania's biggest dance music hits, collaborating with artists including Inna, Akcent, 3rei Sud Est, and Cătălin Josan. As a musical group, they have released numerous singles that have charted on various music charts. They are among the pioneers of the Romanian popcorn music style.

== History ==
Play & Win was formed in 2000 by Radu Bolfea, Marcel Botezan, and Sebastian Barac, all of whom are from Alba Iulia, a city in the Transylvania region of Romania. Throughout their career, the trio collaborated with Activ, creating hits like "Superstar", "Dor", "Heaven" and "Lucruri Simple". Other collaborations include 3rei Sud Est's "Alături de Îngeri", Sistem's "Oare unde eşti", Andra's "We Go Crazy", and Inna's House Music. Their production debut came in 2005 with the single "Kylie" for the Romanian band Akcent. The song peaked in the top 5 of music charts in Belgium, Sweden, Norway, Poland, Russia, Ukraine, and Turkey as well as No. 1 on the Dutch, Finnish and Romanian charts. Play & Win produced Inna's first album Hot, released initially in 2009. The album included the single "Hot", which made Inna the first Romanian artist to top a Billboard chart in the United States when it reached No. 1 on the Billboard Dance/Mix Show Airplay chart. The album also featured charted singles "Love", "Déjà Vu", "Amazing" and "10 Minutes", all of which were written and produced by Play & Win. The singles "Hot" and "Love" from the album received more than 50 million views on YouTube in the first year of their release. Play & Win also produced I Am the Club Rocker, Inna's second studio album released in 2011. The album was certified Gold in both Romania and Poland and was described by Play & Win as their best record so far. The album contained the single "Sun Is Up", which reached No. 1 in Bulgaria and No. 5 on the UK Dance Chart.

Play & Win is also attributed with composing Zero's "Sunny Days", a single that came second in the Romanian National Eurovision Song Contest in 2009. They also produced Morris' "Desire", which reached No. 5 on the Fresh Top 40. Play & Win have also collaborated with Andreea Bănică, producing her No. 1 single "Sexy" in 2010.

Play & Win made their chart debut as singers in 2009 with the single "Slow Motion". It became one of the biggest hits in Romania in the spring of 2009, reaching No. 1 on the Kiss FM Fresh Top 40. Their single "Ya BB" was another chart success in Romania, reaching No. 1 on the official Romanian Top 100 on 5 June 2011. It was the most broadcast song on Romanian radio for 16 weeks. They were featured in the song "Inndia", a single from Inna's third studio album, also produced by the trio. The song was written by Play & Win and released to Romanian mainstream radio stations on 28 June 2012. Music produced by Play & Win for Inna received more than 1 billion views on YouTube and each of Inna's singles had more than 15 million views.

In 2013, Botezan and Barac started a project under the name Marco & Seba, with Radu Bolfea remaining the only member of Play & Win.

== Discography ==
=== Albums ===
As Play & Win

List of albums
| Title | Details |
|---|---|
| Change the World | Release date: 21 June 2011; Label: Roton; Format: CD, digital download |

=== Singles ===
List of singles
| Year | Title | Album |
|---|---|---|
| 2008 | "Summertime" | Change the World |
| 2009 | "Slow Motion" | Change the World |
| 2010 | "10 Minutes" (Inna featuring Play & Win) | Hot |
| 2010 | "Only" | Change the World |
| 2011 | "Ya BB" | Change the World |
| 2012 | "Inndia" (Inna featuring Play & Win) | Party Never Ends |
| 2013 | "Dance with Me" (featuring Antonia) | Non-album singles |
| 2013 | "Don't Try to Stop This" | Non-album singles |
| 2013 | "5 AM" | Non-album singles |
| 2013 | "Lady" | Non-album singles |

== Music production ==
As Play & Win
| Year | Artist | Song |
|---|---|---|
| 2004 | Akcent | "SOS", "Kylie", "Dragoste de Închiriat" |
| 2005 | Activ | "Motive", "Superstar", "Lucruri Simple" |
| 2006 | 3 Sud Est | "Iubire", "Miracle", "Mă iubeai", "Mă doare" |
| 2006 | All Stars (Campanie anti-drog) | "Don't Be a Hero" |
| 2006 | Natalia Barbu | "Îngerul Meu (Baby Don't Cry)" |
| 2007 | Andra | "We Go Crazy" |
| 2008 | Refflex | "Fără ea" |
| 2008 | Cătălin Josan | "Megastart", "Run Away", "Între Noi" |
| 2008 | Sistem featuring Andra | "Oare unde Ești" |
| 2008 | Morris | "Desire", "Till the Morning" |
| 2008 | Crazy Win | "Beautiful Lover" |
| 2008 | Play & Win | "Summertime" |
| 2008 | Inna | "Hot" |
| 2009 | Zero | "Sunny Days" |
| 2009 | Play & Win | "Slow Motion" |
| 2009 | Inna | "Love" |
| 2009 | Bob Taylor featuring Inna | "Déjà Vu" |
| 2009 | Inna | "Amazing", "I Need You for Christmas" |
| 2010 | Andreea Bănică featuring Dony | "Samba" |
| 2010 | Inna featuring Play & Win | "10 Minutes" |
| 2010 | Inna | "Sun Is Up" |
| 2010 | Play & Win | "Only" |
| 2010 | Andreea Bănică | "Sexy" |
| 2010 | Ellie White | "Nu te mai caut" |
| 2011 | Play & Win | "Ya BB" |
| 2011 | Inna featuring Flo Rida | "Club Rocker" |
| 2011 | Inna featuring Juan Magan | "Un Momento" |
| 2011 | Inna | "Endless" |
| 2011 | Desperado | "Inside I Want You" |
| 2012 | Inna | "Wow", "Caliente", "Tu și eu", "Crazy Sexy Wild" |
| 2012 | Inna featuring Play & Win | "Inndia" |
| 2012 | Play & Win featuring Antonia | "Dance with Me" |
| 2013 | Play & Win | "Don't Try to Stop This" |
| 2013 | Play & Win | "5 AM" |
| 2013 | One | "Till the End of Time" |
| 2013 | Play & Win | "Lady" |
| 2015 | 3 Sud Est featuring Inna | "Mai stai" |

== See also ==
- List of music released by Romanian artists that has charted in major music markets
