= Romanian Music Awards =

- Awarded for: Best in music
- Country: Romania
- Presented by: Music Channel Romania
- Formerly called: MTV Romania Music Awards
- First award: 2002

The Romanian Music Awards, or simply RMA, are a Romanian annual event awarding the best artists in Romania's music scene. It is organized by Music Channel Romania and has taken place in various locations in the country. It was held from 2002 until 2014, and returned in 2022.

== Locations ==
=== As MTV Romania Music Awards (2003–07) ===
- June 5, 2003 – Polyvalent Hall, Bucharest
- June 3, 2004 – Palace Hall, Bucharest
- April 23, 2005 – Palace Hall, Bucharest
- June 3, 2006 – Horia Demian Sports Hall, Cluj-Napoca
- May 10, 2007 – Grand Square, Sibiu

=== As Romanian Music Awards (2008–14) ===
- October 5, 2008 – Palace of Culture, Iași
- June 6, 2009 – Prefecture Square, Craiova
- July 10, 2010 – Prefecture Square, Craiova
- September 16, 2011 – Council Square, Brașov
- June 8, 2012 – Prefecture Square, Craiova
- September 14, 2013 – Council Square, Brașov
- September 12, 2014 – Council Square, Brașov
- September 22, 2022 – Râmnicu Vâlcea

== See also ==
- Music Channel Romania
