= Bop Bop =

Single by Inna featuring Eric Turner

from the album Inna and Body and the Sun
- Released: 14 July 2015
- Genre: Dance-pop
- Length: 3:25
- Label: Roton; Empire
- Songwriter(s): Sebastian Barac; Carl Bjorsell; Marcel Botezan; Julimar J-Son Santos; Thomas Troelsen; Eric Turner
- Producer(s): Bjorsell; Troelsen; Turner; Play & Win

Inna singles chronology
"We Wanna" (2015)	"Bop Bop" (2015)	"Yalla" (2015)

Eric Turner singles chronology
"Dancing in My Head" (2012)	"Bop Bop" (2015)

Alternative covers
- Promotional cover artwork

Music video
- Video on YouTube

"Bop Bop" is a song recorded by Romanian singer Inna for her eponymous and fourth studio album (2015) and its Japanese counterpart, Body and the Sun (2015). Featuring the vocals of American recording artist Eric Turner, it was made available for digital consumption on 14 July 2015 through Roton and Empire Music. The recording was written by Sebastian Barac, Carl Bjorsell, Marcel Botezan, Julimar J-Son Santos, Thomas Troelsen and Eric Turner, while production was handled by Bjorsell, Troelsen, Turner and Play & Win. A dance-pop track, "Bop Bop" was described as a departure from the singer's previous work.

While music critics were favorable towards both Inna's and Turner's vocal delivery, the single was awarded with "Best Dance-Pop Song" at the 2015 Radio România Actualități Awards gala. An accompanying music video for the recording—which was heavily aired on Romanian television—premiered on Inna's YouTube channel on 13 July 2015, with it being shot by Dimitri Caceaune, John Perez and David Gal in Bucharest. Promoted by various live performances, "Bop Bop" reached number two on native Airplay 100, and position 94 on the Polish Airplay Top 100.

== Composition ==
"Bop Bop"
A 15-second sample of "Bop Bop", a dance-pop song featuring a "coherent" production and "antrenant" beats.

The recording was written by Sebastian Barac, Carl Bjorsell, Marcel Botezan, Julimar J-Son Santos, Thomas Troelsen and Eric Turner, while the production process was handled by Bjorsell, Troelsen, Turner and Play & Win. Musically, "Bop Bop" is a dance-pop track with a "coherent" production and "antrenant" beats. While Turner delivers vocals for the refrain—which almost entirely consists of the song's name—Inna is responsible for the strophes. Spanish LGTB website Grupo EGF stated that the rhythm of the recording is "danceable", further explaining that it incorporates a "retro air" and an "interesting mix of sounds". Hitfire saw "Bop Bop" as a departure from Inna's previous work. Echoing this thought, the singer confessed in an interview with Romanian radio station Kiss FM that;

It is a collaboration with one of my friends from the international music industry, Eric Turner, a very talented guy from Sweden, and with the boys from Play & Win. It is very particular. I consider that I went through all stages, from popcorn to dance, club and pop music, so I considered that I have reached a maturity which allows me to release a song which I like, which makes me move in a club and makes me want to hear it on the radio, and I'm very fulfilled.

== Reception and accolades ==
Upon its release, "Bop Bop" was met with good reviews from music critics. Jaromír Koc of Czech music website Musicserver praised Turner's contribution to the song through his "unusually colored" voice. While Italian publication R&B Junk's Olivio Umberto found that Inna changed her "formula" by not collaborating with a rapper but with another singer, Grupo EGF labelled "Bop Bop" as "contagious" and "mature", further acclaiming Turner's performance. Music website Hitfire wrote that the song's title is "simple", and went on praising the refrain and Inna's vocal delivery. The singer herself saw the single as "cheerful", "crazy" and "energetic".

Commercially, "Bop Bop" debuted at number 64 on Romania's Airplay 100 on 26 July 2015, remaining her fourth charting song that week alongside "Mai stai" (position 47), "Diggy Down" (position 61) and "We Wanna" (position 76). Subsequently, the recording moved up 37 places to number 27 on the following week, and reached its peak position at number two on 11 October 2015. The single also reached number 94 on the Polish Airplay Top 100. Additionally, "Bop Bop" was awarded with "Best Dance-Pop Song" at the 2015 Radio România Actualități Awards gala, where it was nominated alongside "Când vremea e rea" (2015) by Sore and "Falava" (2015) by Andra.

== Music video ==
=== Background and release ===
The music video for "Bop Bop" was teased on July 9, 2015, featuring a short sequence of Inna and six fellow backup dancer performing synchronized dance moves on a kind of stage or runway. While the dancers were dressed in black and white outfits, the singer sports a sparkling silver top. Three additional videos were released during July 2015 in which the track is played for the first time to unspecified citizens of Los Angeles and Inna's fellow Romanian stars; both videos captured extremely positive input, with some listeners predicting its success. The idea behind the visual was based on Inna's desire to create a "fashion" video, for which clothes were procured by international brands Marni, Givenchy, HBA HOOD by Air, Balmain, KTZ, Ashish, Pierre Hardy, and Romanian designers Cristina Savulescu and Madalina Dorobantu from Pas du Tout. The accompanying clip for the recording finally premiered on Inna's YouTube channel on 13 July 2015, being shot by Dimitri Caceaune, John Perez and David Gal in Bucharest, Romania; George Dascalescu served as its director of photography. The clip has no plot.

=== Synopsis ===
Inna (middle) and her backup dancers performing a synchronized choreography in the music video for "Bop Bop".

The video opens with an old-fashioned TV being turned on, and displaying the word "BOP" on its screen. Following this, several photos of women are seen scattered on the floor of a dark-lightened room, which is then followed by Turner appearing to sing the first refrain of the song on the TV's display, wearing black sunglasses and a silver jacket; two fellow females are watching him. Inna is then shown singing to herself in front of a mirror, and subsequently makes appearance sporting an officer outfit consisting of a black hat and a tie. For the second refrain of "Bop Bop", the singer and her backup dancers are portrayed performing a synchronized choreography on a runaway.

Following this, Inna appears wearing a yellow dress while standing on a stair, with her shadow not moving alike to her. When the track's breakdown is played, Inna is presented lying on a XXL-photo of her face, and she and her backup dancers are shown clapping their hands and performing subtle movements. The visual ends with Inna appearing on the TV's display from the beginning, before it is switched off by a woman previously shown. Scenes interspersed through the main plot portray people performing tribal moves while the video's frame is vertically constrained to just the center of the screen, and two lesbian girls touching their bodies and picturing themselves.

=== Reception and analysis ===
While Musicserver was generally positive towards the music video, Tony Sokol from American music website KpopStarz called it a "scorcher" and Grupo EGF noticed Lesbian vibe. German website Hitfire labelled the outfits used during the clip "interesting", praised the performance of the background dancers, and called the video "recommendable". Jonathan Currinn, writing in his own music website, described the visual as being "fashion involved", and particularly saw Inna's appearance as sexy and confident. Going on, Currinn further likened Turner's appearance on a TV screen to that of Pitbull's in Inna's "Good Time" (2014) and Flo Rida's in The Saturdays's "Higher" (2010), while being positive to the choreography although stating that it "isn't in depth enough". The music video peaked at number two on Media Forest's TV Airplay Chart.

== Live performances and other usage ==
"Bop Bop" was set on the track list of concert tours that promoted her album Inna and its Japanese counterpart Body and the Sun in Europe and Japan. Additionally, Inna sung the song for Kiss FM and at the Grand Bazaar in Istanbul, Turkey. The singer also provided a live performance of the recording at the World Trade Center Mexico, where she additionally sung a cover version of Justin Bieber's "Love Yourself" (2015) and a stripped-down version of "Endless" (2011), and opened the Untold Festival in 2016. For Romanian reality talent show Te cunosc de undeva!, Carmen Simonescu impersonated Inna and delivered a performance of "Bop Bop".

== Track listing ==
- Digital download
1. "Bop Bop" (featuring Eric Turner) – 3:25
- Official remixes
1. "Bop Bop" (featuring Eric Turner) [Deepierro Remix] – 3:27
2. "Bop Bop" (featuring Eric Turner) [Embody Remix] – 3:24
3. "Bop Bop" (featuring Eric Turner) [Global B Remix] – 4:15
4. "Bop Bop" (featuring Eric Turner) [House of Titans Remix] – 3:41
5. "Bop Bop" (featuring Eric Turner) [Jordan Viper Remix] – 5:14
6. "Bop Bop" (featuring Eric Turner) [Shandree Remix] – 4:12

== Charts ==
=== Weekly charts ===
Chart (2015)	Peak position
Poland (Polish Airplay Top 100)	94
Romania (Airplay 100)	2

=== Year-end charts ===
Chart (2015)	Position
Romania (Airplay 100)	37

== Release history ==
Country	Date	Format	Label
France	14 July 2015	Digital download	Roton/ Empire
Germany	14 July 2015	Digital download	Roton/ Empire
Italy	14 July 2015	Digital download	Roton/ Empire
Netherlands	14 July 2015	Digital download	Roton/ Empire
Romania	14 July 2015	Digital download	Roton/ Empire
Russia	14 July 2015	Digital download	Roton/ Empire
United Kingdom	14 July 2015	Digital download	Roton/ Empire
United States	24 July 2015	Digital download	Roton/ Empire
