= Rendez Vous (Inna song) =

Single by Inna

from the album Inna and Body and the Sun
- Released: 12 February 2016
- Length: 3:08
- Label: Roton
- Songwriters: Rainer Gaffrey; Ilsey Juber; Kai Matthiesen; Delroy Rennalls; Andreas Schuller; Thomas Troelsen
- Producers: Axident; Troelsen

Inna singles chronology
| "Yalla" (2015) | "Rendez Vous" (2016) | "Heaven" (2016) |

"Rendez Vous" is a song recorded by Romanian recording artist Inna for her eponymous and fourth studio album (2015) and its Japanese version Body and the Sun (2015). It was made available for digital download as a single on 12 February 2016 through Roton. The song makes use of a sample of Mr. President's "Coco Jamboo" (1996), resulting in writing credits for its composers Rainer Gaffrey, Kai Matthiesen and Delroy Rennalls. "Rendez Vous" was written by Ilsey Juber, Andreas Schuller and Thomas Troelsen, and produced by Troelsen and Schuller under the name Axident. Musically, the mid-tempo song contains acoustic elements and Eurodance influences in its refrain, with Inna singing about meeting the man she loved in the summer.

"Rendez Vous" received praise for its production from one music critic. A writer at Billboard listed the track at number two on his list of favorite songs of 2016. An accompanying music video for "Rendez Vous" was uploaded onto Inna's official YouTube channel on 4 February 2016. It was shot by Michael Abt and John Perez in Costa Rica in 2015, showing the singer at the beach. Commercially, the recording peaked at number 45 in Romania, number 12 in Poland and topped the latter country's dance component chart. It was also certified Gold by the Polish Society of the Phonographic Industry (ZPAV) for selling 10,000 units in Poland.

== Composition and release ==
"Rendez Vous" was written by Ilsey Juber, Andreas Schuller and Thomas Troelsen, whilst production was handled by Troeslen and Schuller under the name Axident. The track was recorded in both Copenhagen and Ibiza. It is a mid-tempo track containing acoustic elements and a Eurodance-influenced refrain. Yohann Ruelle of Pure Charts noticed a "leaping guitar" and electro rhythms in its instrumentation. Lyrically, Inna sings nostalgically about meeting the man she loved in the summer. "Rendez Vous" samples the melody of Mr. President's "Coco Jamboo" (1996), which resulted in writing credits for its composers Rainer Gaffrey, Kai Matthiesen and Delroy Rennalls.

The track was first released in Italy on 12 February 2017 by Roton, with its worldwide availability following on 16 February 2016 through both Empire Records and Roton. An eight-remix extended play (EP) was also made available for digital download on 9 March 2017 by the same labels. "Rendez Vous" was released to celebrate Inna reaching one billion total views on her YouTube channel in February 2017. Shortly after, the song was added to Radio Eska's Hot 20 Eska Radio playlist in March 2016.

== Critical and commercial reception ==
Music critics received "Rendez Vous" with positive reviews. An editor from Radio Eska wrote that the recording had a "spring sound" that "evokes us to forget about the reality surrounding us", further praising its qualitative production. Gordon Murray, a writer at Billboard, listed the track at number two on his list of favorite songs of 2016. Commercially, "Rendez Vous" debuted at number 73 on the Romanian Airplay 100 issued on 3 April 2016, reaching its peak position at number 45 on 22 May 2016. The song also experienced commercial success in Poland, where it reached number 12 on the Airplay Top 100 chart and topped the Dance Top 50 component chart. "Rendez Vous" was certified Gold by the Polish Society of the Phonographic Industry (ZPAV) in the country for selling over 10,000 units.

== Music video ==
Inna hinted at the filming location of an accompanying music video by posting captions such as "Hola desde Costa Rica", "Pura vida" and "Días libre #Puravida" on her social media. She already announced that the video was finished in a YouTube video released in October 2015. The clip was filmed in 2015 in Costa Rica by Michael Abt and John Perez, and was uploaded onto the singer's YouTube channel on 4 February 2016. The visual begins with Inna driving a car to the beach with two female friends. She subsequently encounters a few men and then surfs before driving to what appears to be a hotel with her friends. After the singer attends a party at night, the video ends with her driving away and the text "PURA VIDA..." and "COSTA RICA." appearing on the screen. During the video, Inna is also shown in a cornfield.

Cristina Merino from Europa FM wrote that the music video was a more natural portrayal of the singer and praised her looks. Rnb Junk's Daniele Traini thought the clip showed "the beauty of the summer" and commended its concept — which she likened to her previous videos for "Amazing" (2009) and "More than Friends" (2013) — although criticizing its low budget. Jonathan Currinn, writing for his own website, described Inna's appearance in the video as "sultry, sexy and scenic" and said the clip had "summer vibes". However, he criticized the lack of depth and plot: "The field where Inna performs is probably where the video loses the audience's interest. She looks sexy as always and yet once again is given no choreography and the camera angles just doesn't work for her. It's almost as if she doesn't know what to do in front of the camera". The visual received notable airplay on Polish television, peaking at number three on ZPAV's Video Chart in May 2017.

== Track listing ==
Digital download
| No. | Title | Length |
|---|---|---|
| 1. | "Rendez Vous" | 3:08 |

Digital remixes EP
| No. | Title | Length |
|---|---|---|
| 1. | "Rendez Vous" | 3:08 |
| 2. | "Rendez Vous" (Extended Mix) | 4:14 |
| 3. | "Rendez Vous" (Alfred Beck Remix) | 6:17 |
| 4. | "Rendez Vous" (Andros Remix) | 4:01 |
| 5. | "Rendez Vous" (Criminal Sounds Remix) | 3:39 |
| 6. | "Rendez Vous" (DJ Asher ScreeN Remix) | 4:42 |
| 7. | "Rendez Vous" (Thrace Remix) | 3:00 |
| 8. | "Rendez Vous" (Armageddon Turk Spring Breakers Mix) | 3:52 |

== Charts and certifications ==
=== Weekly charts ===
| Chart (2016) | Peak position |
|---|---|
| Poland Airplay (ZPAV) | 12 |
| Poland Dance (ZPAV) | 1 |
| Poland (Video Chart) | 3 |
| Romania (Airplay 100) | 45 |

=== Certifications ===
| Region | Certification | Certified units/sales |
|---|---|---|
| Poland (ZPAV) | Gold | 10,000^{‡} |
^{‡} Sales+streaming figures based on certification alone.

== Release history ==
| Region | Date | Format | Label |
|---|---|---|---|
| Italy | 12 February 2016 | Digital download | Roton |
| Various | 16 February 2016 | Digital download | Empire / Roton |
| Italy | 2 March 2016 | Radio airplay | DIY |
