= Yalla (song) =

Single by Inna

from the album Inna and Body and the Sun
- Language: English; Arabic
- Released: 3 November 2015
- Genre: Dance-pop; Eurodance
- Length: 2:51
- Label: Empire; Roton
- Songwriters: Marcel Botezan; Sebastian Barac; Nadir Tamuz Augustin; Elena Alexandra Apostoleanu
- Producer: Play & Win

Inna singles chronology
| "Bop Bop" (2015) | "Yalla" (2015) | "Rendez Vous" (2016) |

"Yalla" is a song recorded by Romanian singer Inna for her eponymous fourth studio album (2015) and its Japanese counterpart, Body and the Sun (2015). It was released on 3 November 2015 through Empire and Roton. The recording was written by Marcel Botezan, Sebastian Barac, Nadir Tamuz Augustin and Inna, while production was handled by the first two under the name of Play & Win. A dance-pop and Eurodance track, "Yalla" is sung by Inna in both English and Arabic.

Music critics were positive towards the song, commending its production and commercial appeal. An accompanying music video for "Yalla" (which received notable airplay in Romania) was shot by Barna Nemethi in Marrakesh, Morocco and premiered on YouTube on 12 November 2015. Featuring Inna chased by a man at a bazaar, it attracted multiple comments written in Arabic. To promote the single, Inna performed it at various concert venues. Commercially, "Yalla" peaked at number 13 in Romania and at number 18 on the Polish dance chart.

== Composition and release ==
"Yalla" was written by Marcel Botezan, Sebastian Barac, Nadir Tamuz Augustin and Inna, while production was handled by the first two under the name of Play & Win. It is a dance-pop song performed in English and its refrain in Arabic. Italian publication RnB Junk's Daniele Traino wrote that the track combined Inna's "typical" Eurodance style with oriental sounds, comparing its vibe to Madonna's "La Isla Bonita" (1987). German portal Hitfire likened the recording to Major Lazer and DJ Snake featuring MØ's "Lean On" (2015), writing that the success of the latter possibly influenced the singer to release "Yalla" as a single. A digital remixes extended play of the song was released on 3 November 2015 by Empire and Roton. The single version features an additional second verse not included on the version featured on her eponymous and fourth studio album (2015) and its Japanese counterpart Body and the Sun.

== Reception ==
Music critics were positive towards the song. Traini from RnB Junk wrote that "Yalla" was one of the most captivating, refined and peculiar songs from Inna's eponymous studio album, noting its commercial appeal. An editor of Pro FM listed the recording in their list of "16 hits with which Inna made history". Jonathan Currinn, writing in his own website, said that the singer "appeal[ed] to people around the world" by including Arabic language in "Yalla", while portal Hitfire commended the "strong" strophes of the song, Inna's vocals and the beat. The recording debuted on native Airplay 100 at number 94 on 12 November 2015, climbing to number 80 the next week. It reached its peak position at number 13 on 1 May 2016. In Poland, "Yalla" reached position 18 on ZPAV's Dance Top 50 component chart.

== Music video and promotion ==
Inna performed a stripped-down version of "Yalla" on Radio ZU on 17 November 2015. "Yalla" was set on the track list of concert tours that promoted Inna and Body and the Sun in Europe and Japan. The singer also provided live performances of the recording at festival Alba Fest held in Alba Iulia, Romania, and at the World Trade Center Mexico.

An accompanying music video for "Yalla" was filmed by Barna Nemethi in Marrakesh, Morocco over three days, with Inna and John Perez acting as co-directors. While both Perez and Bogdan Daragiu were the directors of photography, Khaled Mokhtar handled the editing process. The outfits worn in the clip were inspired by and adapted to Arab culture; designers included Cristina Săvulescu, Mădălina Dorobanţu from Pas du Tout, Wanda's Dream New York, Artizana and Tria Alfa. The music video was uploaded onto Inna's official YouTube channel on 12 November 2015, with a teaser of it released few days prior. The clip features a dromedary, the second animal to appear in one of Inna's music videos after "Diggy Down" previously featured a snake.

The video commences with Inna coming out from a body of water, following which she gets chased by a man—played by Yassir Lamrani Selmane—at a bazaar and through the surroundings of a building. This is followed by the singer and her female background dancers performing choreography. Scenes interspersed through the main plot portray Inna singing in front of a door, and her in a desert with a dromedary and dancing around a fire with her backup dancers. Regarding the singer's appearance in the music video, Yohann Ruelle of Pure Charts wrote, "Inna knows how to turn on the temperature!" Valentina Malfroy from website Aficia commended the quality of the visual and saw Inna as charming. An editor of Vagalume thought Inna "plays a girl who abuses her sensuality in typical costumes and a lot of Arabic dance to enchant her love interest." Currinn, writing in his own website, praised Inna's choreography and the video overall, whilst Hitfire recommended the clip and said it matched the song. After its release on YouTube, the music video attracted many comments written in Arabic. It received notable airplay in Romania, peaking at number seven on Media Forest's TV Airplay chart.

== Track listing ==
Digital remixes EP

1. "Yalla" – 2:51
2. "Yalla" (Extended version) – 4:04
3. "Yalla" (A Turk Remix) – 1:28
4. "Yalla" (Deepierro Offir Malol Remix Edit) – 3:15
5. "Yalla (DJ Amine Radi Moroccan Remix)" – 3:58
6. "Yalla" (DJ Asher ScreeN Remix) – 3:56

== Charts ==
=== Weekly charts ===
| Chart (2015–16) | Peak position |
|---|---|
| Poland Dance (ZPAV) | 18 |
| Romania (Airplay 100) | 13 |

=== Year-end charts ===
| Chart (2016) | Position |
|---|---|
| Romania (Airplay 100) | 22 |
