= Cola Song =

Single by Inna featuring J Balvin

from the album Body and the Sun and Party Never Ends
- Released: 15 April 2014
- Genre: Electro house; electronic; Latin
- Length: 3:18
- Label: Atlantic
- Songwriters: José Álvaro Osorio Balvín; Andrew Frampton; Breyan Isaac; Thomas Joseph Rozdilsky; Andreas Schuller
- Producers: Balvín; Rozdilsky; Schuller

Inna singles chronology
"In Your Eyes" (2013)	"Cola Song" (2014)	"Good Time" (2014)

J Balvin singles chronology
"6 AM" (2014)	"Cola Song" (2014)	"Ay Vamos" (2014)

Music video
- "Cola Song" on YouTube

"Cola Song" is a song recorded by Romanian recording artist Inna for Body and the Sun (2015), the Japanese counterpart of her fourth studio album Inna (2015), and the American counterpart of her third studio album, Party Never Ends. It was made available for digital download on 15 April 2014 through Atlantic Records, which was the result of the singer signing a record deal with the label earlier that year. Initially planned to be named "Soy Latinna", the recording contains guest vocals from Colombian reggaeton performer J Balvin, who wrote and produced the song along with Andrew Frampton, Breyan Isaac, Thomas Joseph Rozdilsky and Andreas Schuller. The single is musically an electro house, electronic and Latin track which incorporates saxophone and horn in its instrumentation, and elements from Inna's previous collaboration with Schuller on "Piñata 2014" (2013).

Music critics were generally favorable towards the single. While it was likened to Lana Del Rey's "Cola" (2012) and the appearance of J Balvin to that of Colby O'Donis on Lady Gaga's "Just Dance" (2008), many reviews noted the song as being summery. Others pointed out its commercial appeal, where the single was predicted to become a summer hit alongside Jennifer Lopez's "I Luh Ya Papi" (2014). "Cola Song" received a nomination at the Radio România Actualități Awards gala in 2015 for Best Pop-Dance Song.

Commercially, the single experienced success in Europe. While reaching the top 40 of the charts in various territories, it peaked at number eight on Spain's PROMUSICAE chart, and was certified Platinum there for sales exceeding 40,000 copies. In order to promote "Cola Song", an accompanying music video for the song was uploaded onto Inna's YouTube channel on 14 April 2014, being shot by John Perez in both Barcelona and Costa Rica. The visual portrays Inna performing to the song with three fellow background dancers or doing other activities in a tropical scenery, and was acclaimed by music critics who saw Inna's appearance as sexy, suggestive and lascivious. It was also nominated for Best Video at the Romanian Music Awards gala in 2014. For further promotion, the track was performed by the singer on various occasions, and was featured on dance video game Just Dance 2017 and used for the FIFA World Cup 2014.

== Background and release ==
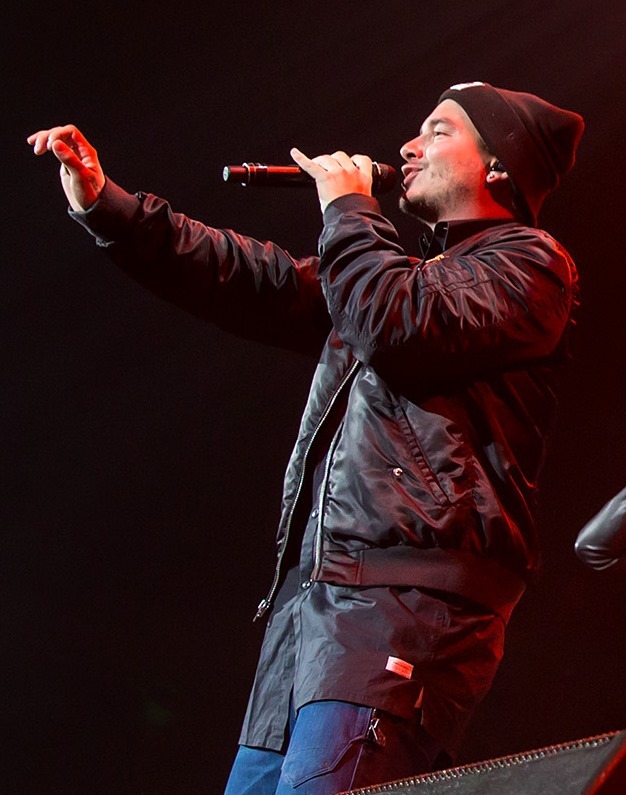
"Cola Song" features a rap verse from Colombian reggaeton performer J Balvin (pictured).

In 2014, Inna signed a record deal with Warner Music's Atlantic Records to release the single on 15 April; however, it was leaked onto the internet one day before. In an interview with Direct Lyrics before the availability of "Cola Song", the singer felt the track is very summery, and additionally confessed that she thought of collaborating with J Balvin after listening to his music during her tours in Latin America. The single was initially planned to be called "Soy Latinna", but after Inna presented the track to a private group of friends, they wanted her to sing the "Cola Song"—a title they created—ten more times to them, thus resulting in Inna deciding to change the name.

The cover artwork for the single was revealed prior to the song's release, and portrays Inna posing in bikini. Umberto Olivio of Italian publication RnB Junk predicted that this image would precede a similar sound to Inna's previous songs "Caliente (2012) and "More than Friends" (2013). "Cola Song" was included on the American edition of her third studio album, Party Never Ends (2013), and was later featured on the Japanese counterpart of her fourth record Inna (2015), titled Body and the Sun (2015). The recording was released through Atlantic Records on 15 April 2014 simultaneously to iTunes Store in multiple countries. The 2020 Complete Edition of Inna, released to SoundCloud, would eventually include the song.

== Composition ==
"Cola Song"
A 24-second sample of "Cola Song", an electro house, electronic and Latin track, which incorporates saxophone and horn as instrumentation.

"Cola Song" was written by J Balvin, Andrew Frampton, Breyan Isaac, Thomas Joseph Rozdilsky and Andreas Schuller, while production was handled by the Colombian reggaeton performer along with Rozdilsky and Schuller. While featuring guest vocals from J Balvin, the song incorporates elements from Inna's previous collaboration with Schuller on "Piñata 2014" (2013). Musically, the recording is of the electro house genre and portrays a "subtle blend" of electronic and Latin music. According to German music website Dance Charts, "Cola Song" features "typical Romania-House" sounds, alongside offbeat-bass and "natural instruments" like a saxophone. Bradely Stern from MuuMuse wrote that the song incorporates a "horn-heavy" breakdown reminiscent of American singer Jason Derulo's "Talk Dirty" (2013). During the lyrics, Inna sings, "We got that Coca-Cola bottle shape, shape, shape. We got that sugar, do you wanna taste, taste, taste?", which was associated with the singer's ended collaboration with Pepsi.

== Reception ==
Upon its release, the track received positive reviews from music critics. While Sebastian Wernke-Schmiesing of music website Dance Charts expected "Cola Song" to become a summer hit and was positive towards its "earwom[y]" refrain, German portal Hitfire called the single's title "simple" and "trashy", while noticing "nonsense" lyrics and a "memorable" beat. MuuMuse's Bradely Stern described "Cola Song" as "fiesta-friendly, fresh 'n summery", and further called it "the most captivating and catchy [ode] to soda pop since — well, Godneys 'Soda Pop'. (And Lana's 'Cola', of course.)" Additionally, Stern likened J Balvin's contribution to the recording to that of Colby O'Donis's on Lady Gaga's "Just Dance" (2008), and expected the recording to become a summer hit alongside "I Luh Ya Papi" (2014) by Jennifer Lopez. Jaromír Koc of Czech website Musicserver praised the beat and labelled the saxophone in the song "most pleasant". German website Salsa und Tango listed "Cola Song" in their list of 2014's summer hits. "Cola Song" received a nomination for Best Pop-Dance Song at the Radio România Actualități Awards gala in 2015.

The song performed moderately on the Belgian charts. The recording further peaked at number 70 on Czech Republic's Rádio Top 100 chart and reached its peak position at number 15 on the Finnish Singles Chart after two editions. "Cola Song" was less successful in Germany, where it lasted within the top 80 for one sole week, but experienced major fame on Spain's PROMUSICAE chart. It debuted at number 40 and continued climbing up the charts until reaching number 11. While dropping a position lower the subsequent week, the recording reached a new peak position at number eight after two editions. "Cola Song" was certified Platinum in that territory in early 2015 for exceeding sales of 40,000 units. While the song achieved a top 40 ranking in several other countries—Slovakia, Turkey, Hungary, Romania, Switzerland and Mexico—it additionally peaked within the top ten on Poland's Dance Top 40.

== Music video ==
An accompanying music video for the single was uploaded on Inna's YouTube channel on 14 April 2014. An additional clip where the song was played to anonymous people in Hollywood, Florida premiered on 3 April 2014, and a behind-the-scenes footage was released on 9 April 2014. The official video was shot in both Barcelona and Costa Rica by John Perez, who has previously worked with Colombian singer Shakira, Barbadian recording artist Rihanna and American performer Beyoncé.

Inna (middle) performing a synchronized choreography in the music video with two fellow background dancers. This was referred to by MuuMuse as the "Coca-Cola Shake".

The clip opens with Inna walking in a bikini and J Balvin doing rap movements, sporting a black T-shirt and pants along with red shoes. Subsequently, Inna is portrayed performing a synchronized choreography with two fellow background dancers while wearing a white body suit. For the second strophe of the song, Inna makes appearance in a darkened whole where she swims in a body of water, poses topless or dances along with the backup performers showed in the beginning. While further accompanying J Balvin for his rap cameo, the video ends with her staring at the camera before the screen becomes dark. Scenes interspersed through the main plot present Inna playing in sand and touching her body, angle shots of her standing on a rock, or shadowed singer and men with instruments in their hands.

"I feel that the video for 'Cola Song' is one of my sexiest videos, it makes me feel good about myself, full of energy, ready for a long and beautiful summer and I hope all my Club Rockers will enjoy watching it, they will dance and have a good time listening to it."

Music portal Dance Charts was positive towards the music video, although expressing that viewers may neglect the music when watching it. Echoing this thought, Hitfire further wrote that it is "surely a contender for the hottest video of the year". While German magazine Klatsch-Tratsch noticed "much charm, naked skin and great moves" in the visual, Kevin Apaza of Direct Lyrics pointed out Inna "flaunting that smokin' hot body of hers as she soaks up the sun at the beach, [getting] wet in a lake and [performing] sensual choreographies." Website MuuMuse wrote that the visual is "quite important for showcasing Inna's ferocious moves and luscious assets, including her Coca-Cola shape — and especially her Coca-Cola shake", and French publications Purebreak and Pure People noticed Inna's "suggestive" and "lascivious" posing in bathing suits. Portal Cosmopolitan Staragora compared the music video to Inna's previous material, as the singer "appears little dressed in paradisiac landscapes: ocean blue lagoon, sunset, fine white sand, pretty girls [...]". Spanish website Jukebox wrote that the singer "[evokes] the similarity between her curvilinear forms and those of a bottle of Coca-Cola. It is not clear if it is an advertising for the drink or not, but there is no doubt that this fresh and summery video promotes the consumption of the soft drink", alongside stating that Inna "shines in trikini" and "dances in purest Latin style". Music portal Musicserver was more negative towards the clip; although stating that it "probably will please the male fanbase", the website concluded that, "Everyone already knows that it is sexy, so why offering the same for the tenth time?" The music video received a nomination for Best Video at the Romanian Music Awards gala in 2014.

== Live performances and usage in media ==
"Cola Song" was set on the track list of concert tours that promoted the singer's album Inna and its Japanese counterpart Body and the Sun in Europe and Japan. She also provided live performances of the recording at festival Alba Fest held in Alba Iulia, Romania, and at the World Trade Center Mexico. On both occasions, the singer additionally sung a cover version of Justin Bieber's "Love Yourself" (2015), with her interpreting a stripped-down version of "Endless" (2011) at the Mexican venue. Inna also opened the Untold Festival in 2016, and uploaded two videos on YouTube presenting her performing a stripped-down version of the recording—one on the roof of a building in Venice Beach, California, and the latter accompanied by an orchestra at Global Studios. Inna also delivered a performance of it at the 2018 Telehit Awards. "Cola Song" was used for American action comedy film Spy (2015) and the FIFA World Cup 2014, and was included on the competition's soundtrack. The single was further featured on dance video game Just Dance 2017, and Romanian singer George Papagheorghe impersonated Inna and provided a performance of the recording for Romanian reality talent show Te cunosc de undeva!.

== Track listing ==
- Official versions
1. "Cola Song" (featuring J Balvin) – 3:18
2. "Cola Song" (featuring J Balvin) [Whyel Remix] – 3:56
3. "Cola Song" (featuring J Balvin) [ZooFunktion Remix] – 4:06
4. "Cola Song" (featuring J Balvin) [Lookas Remix] – 2:58

== Charts and certifications ==
=== Weekly charts ===
Chart (2014–17)	Peak position
Belgium Dance (Ultratop Wallonia)	31
Belgium (Ultratip Bubbling Under Wallonia)	9
CIS (Tophit)	154
Czech Republic Airplay (ČNS IFPI)	70
Ecuador (National-Report)	64
Finland (Suomen virallinen lista)	15
Germany (GfK)	77
Hungary (Dance Top 40)	31
Hungary (Stream Top 40)	3
Italy (FIMI)	93
Mexico Espanol Airplay (Billboard)	40
Poland Dance (ZPAV)	10
Romania (Airplay 100)	34
Slovakia Airplay (ČNS IFPI)	14
Slovakia Singles Digital (ČNS IFPI)	91
Slovenia (SloTop50)	46
Spain (Promusicae)	8
Switzerland (Schweizer Hitparade)	36
Turkey (Turkish Singles Chart)	17

=== Year-end charts ===
Chart (2014)	Peak position
Poland (Dance Top 50)	5
Romania (Media Forest)	77
Spain (PROMUSICAE)	44
Ukraine Airplay (Tophit)	120

=== Certifications ===
Region	Certification	Certified units/sales
Spain (Promusicae)	Platinum	40,000^{*}
^{*} Sales figures based on certification alone.

== Release history ==
Country	Date	Format	Label
France	15 April 2014	Digital download	Atlantic
Germany	15 April 2014	Digital download	Atlantic
Italy	15 April 2014	Digital download	Atlantic
Japan	15 April 2014	Digital download	Atlantic
Netherlands	15 April 2014	Digital download	Atlantic
Romania	15 April 2014	Digital download	Atlantic
Russia	15 April 2014	Digital download	Atlantic
United Kingdom	15 April 2014	Digital download	Atlantic
United States	15 April 2014	Digital download	Atlantic

== See also ==
- List of music released by Romanian artists that has charted in major music markets
