= Inndia =

Single by Inna featuring Play & Win

from the album Party Never Ends
- Released: 11 October 2012
- Length: 3:37
- Label: Roton
- Songwriters: Sebastian Barac; Radu Bolfea; Marcel Botezan; Joddie Connor
- Producer: Play & Win

Inna singles chronology
"Crazy Sexy Wild" (2012)	"Inndia" (2012)	"More than Friends" (2013)

"Inndia" (stylized as "INNdiA") is a song recorded by Romanian singer Inna from her third studio album, Party Never Ends (2013). It was released on 11 October 2012 through Roton and features Romanian trio Play & Win. The track was written by Sebastian Barac, Radu Bolfea, Marcel Botezan and Joddie Connor, while production was handled by the first three under the name of Play & Win. "Inndia" is an Arabic and oriental-influenced song encompassing guitar accords and male vocals which complement Inna.

Critical response to "Inndia" was mixed, with one critic calling it passable, while another included it in their list of the best Inna songs. To promote the track, an accompanying music video was shot by Edward Aninaru and was uploaded onto Inna's official YouTube channel on 19 September 2012. It shows the singer helping a stripper to escape from her aggressive boss in a club. Multiple reviewers noted the inclusion of lesbian women in the visual and Inna's lascivious appearance. The singer also performed "Inndia" on various occasions. Commercially, it reached the top ten in Romania and number one in Turkey.

== Background and release ==
"Inndia" was written by Sebastian Barac, Radu Bolfea, Marcel Botezan and Joddie Connor, while production was handled by the first three under the name of Play & Win. The trio was also credited as a featuring artist on the track. The song was made available for digital download on 11 October 2012 by Roton, featuring six remixes along with the original track. An accompanying artwork was unveiled in September 2012, with Alex from Romanian website Urban.ro noting that Inna looked "sexy and exotic" on the cover.

== Composition and reception ==
"Inndia"
A 22-second sample of "Inndia", an Arabic and oriental-influenced song featuring guitar accords and male vocals which complement Inna.

An editor from Italian website RnB Junk wrote that "Inndia" was an "oriental-like" song, noting that its title coincided with its style. He further pointed out that the song featured elements not approached by the singer in previous material. Alin from Urban.ro similarly thought that the recording was of a new style compared to Inna's previous work, noting Arabic influences, guitar accords and male vocals complementing the singer. Reagan Gavin Rasquinh of The Times of India wrote, "despite the title, [the track] has nothing to do with the subcontinent, in case you were wondering." According to Urban.ro, "Inndia" refers to the name of a woman who is portrayed in the music video.

Upon its release, music critics met "Inndia" with mixed reviews. An editor of Pro FM listed the recording in their list of "16 hits with which Inna made history". The Times of India's Gavin Rasquinh found "Inndia" was "another passable track with a thwacking snare sound". Commercially, the song reached number ten on Romania's Airplay 100 on 21 January 2013, becoming her ninth top ten hit in the country. It also topped the charts in Turkey on 6 July 2013.

== Promotion ==
An accompanying music video for "Inndia" was shot by Edward Aninaru, and was uploaded onto Inna's official YouTube channel on 19 September 2012. It was preceded by a lyrics video released on 28 June 2012 on the same platform. The visual begins with shots of a woman smoking and female strippers pole dancing in a club. Inna enterers the building and sits down at the bar starting a conversation with the female bartender. Subsequently, the singer is seen pole dancing for a gentleman. Later in the video, she cares for a female stripper named "Inndia" with a scar on her face, who sits in a bathtub next to her. Inna also secretly watches how Inndia is beaten by her boss in another scene. Both manage to escape the respective room after Inna breaks a glass over the man's head. Subsequently, they enter the club where the singer pole dances in front of a huge crowd along with other females. "Inndia" is shortly seen sitting on a couch with two other women, who write the words "rock" and "party" on her skin with eyeliner. Cut scenes show Inna wearing black lingerie on a bed with a female dressed similarly.

Reviewers were generally positive towards the music video. Fabien Eckert from 20 minutes wrote that it was appealing to the male audience, noting Inna's lascivious appearance. An editor from RnB Junk similarly said that the singer showed "her model physics" in the clip, and thought that "the clip will make the singer's [male] fans happy as the female audience can simply skip it". Edi of Urban.ro found that "Inndia" was Inna's sexiest and most explicit visual, further noting semi-nude dancers and Inna's portrayal of a lesbian. Echoing this thought, Spanish Lesbian-themed portal Lesbicanarios listed it at number three on their list the best music videos featuring lesbians.

Inna performed the song in a stripped-down version in the backyard of her grandmother's house on 11 September 2012, followed by an appearance on Romanian radio station Kiss FM on 27 November. The singer also performed live on the roof of a building in Istanbul on 7 December as part of the singer's "Rock the Roof" series. Inna also sang the song at Alba Fest held in Alba Iulia, Romania, and at the World Trade Center Mexico City. In December 2018, Inna performed "Inndia" on O Ses Türkiye.

== Track listing ==
- Digital download
1. "Inndia" (feat. Play & Win) [Radio Edit] – 3:37
2. "Inndia" (feat. Play & Win) [Ciprian Robu Dubstep Remix] – 3:13
3. "Inndia" (feat. Play & Win) [DJ Turtle Remix Radio Edit] – 3:52
4. "Inndia" (feat. Play & Win) [DJ Turtle Remix] – 5:23
5. "Inndia" (feat. Play & Win) [Fork'n'Knife Remix] – 5:35
6. "Inndia" (feat. Play & Win) [Salvatore Ganacci Remix] – 3:48
7. "Inndia" (feat. Play & Win) [Tony Zampa Mix] – 5:00

== Credits and personnel ==
Credits adapted from the liner notes of Party Never Ends.

- Inna – lead vocals
- Sebastian Barac – composer, producer
- Radu Bolfea – composer, producer
- Marcel Botezan – composer, producer
- Joddie Connor – composer

== Charts ==
Chart (2013)	Peak position
Romania (Airplay 100)	10
Turkey (Number One Top 20)	1

== Release history ==
Region	Date	Format	Label
Romania	11 October 2012	Digital download	Roton
United States	11 October 2012	Digital download	Roton
Italy	26 October 2012	Digital download	Ego
