= Inna (album) =

Studio album by Inna
- Released: 23 July 2015 (Body and the Sun); 30 October 2015 (Inna)
- Length: 57:28 (Body and the Sun); 48:39 (Inna)
- Languages: Arabic; English; Spanish; French; Portuguese
- Labels: Roton; Empire; Warner

Inna chronology
Party Never Ends (2013)	Inna (2015)	Nirvana (2017)

Alternative cover
- Body and the Sun version

Singles from Inna and Body and the Sun
- 1. "Cola Song" Released: 15 April 2014; 2. "Good Time" Released: 15 July 2014; 3. "Diggy Down" Released: 15 December 2014; 4. "We Wanna" Released: 8 June 2015; 5. "Bop Bop" Released: 14 July 2015; 6. "Yalla" Released: 3 November 2015; 7. "Rendez Vous" Released: 12 February 2016

Inna is the fourth studio album recorded by Romanian singer Inna. It was released on 30 October 2015 by Warner Music, while a Japanese version of the record titled Body and the Sun was made available on 23 July 2015 by Roton and Empire Music. The singer collaborated with various producers on the album, including The Monsters and the Strangerz, Axident, Play & Win and Thomas Troelsen. Its material includes multiple genres, such as dance-pop, deep house, electro house, electropop and Latin.

The album's title was originally planned to be Latinna, and it also includes promotional singles intended for the cancelled extended play (EP) Summer Days. Inna and Body and the Sun were supported by several concert tours in Europe and Japan. Seven singles have also been released to aid the record, of which "Cola Song" (2014) was successful in Europe and was certified Platinum in Spain and "Diggy Down" (2014) marked Inna's third number one hit in Romania. Commercially, Inna only reached minor success on record charts, peaking at number 157 in Japan and at position 45 in Mexico.

== Background and release ==
[Inna is] about me and my fans, it's about the energy that we have together. It's so amazing when you see a lot of people singing your songs and dancing on your music, that you get so much inspired to go back in the studio and write about that.

— Inna talking about Inna.

Inna first hinted at the release of new music by uploading a preview of unreleased tracks on her YouTube channel on 18 October 2014; the video included samples of "Bamboreea", "Jungle", "We Wanna", "Rendez Vous", "Danse avec moi" and "Hola". The album was originally scheduled to be named Latinna (stylized as LatINNA). In an interview with Direct Lyrics in April 2014, the singer said that title alluded at her "feel[ing] Latinna" (Latina) and her notable success in Spanish-speaking, Latin-origin territories. The album was then changed to Inna as "[she wants] that and [she feels] that right now". The singer also stated that it is "a lot of [her] and [her] energy, and [she] felt it coming very natural", confessing that her favorite track on the album was "Fool Me". The record includes "Take Me Higher", "Low", "Devil's Paradise", "Tell Me", "Body and the Sun" and "Summer Days", which were released as promotional singles in 2014 for the cancelled extended play (EP) Summer Days. Inna recorded the album in one year in various cities, such as Barcelona, Ibiza, Los Angeles and Copenhagen.

Inna was released worldwide on 30 October 2015 by Warner, followed by its availability in Turkey on digitally and physical formats on 6 November 2015 and 29 April 2016, respectively, through Yeni Dünya Müzik. A digital download and CD was also released to Mexico on 11 March and 25 March 2016, respectively, by Warner. A Japanese edition of the record, titled Body and the Sun, was first released digitally worldwide on 23 July 2015 by Roton and Empire Music. Subsequently, it was made available in Japan on both digital and CD formats by Warner Music on 31 July 2015 and 5 August 2015, respectively. Pure Charts called the album's release process "chaotic". In an interview, Inna said that she decided with her team to make a special Japanese version of the record since Japan was selected as the first country for the album's release. They looked at fans' reactions when putting together its tracklist.

== Promotion and composition ==
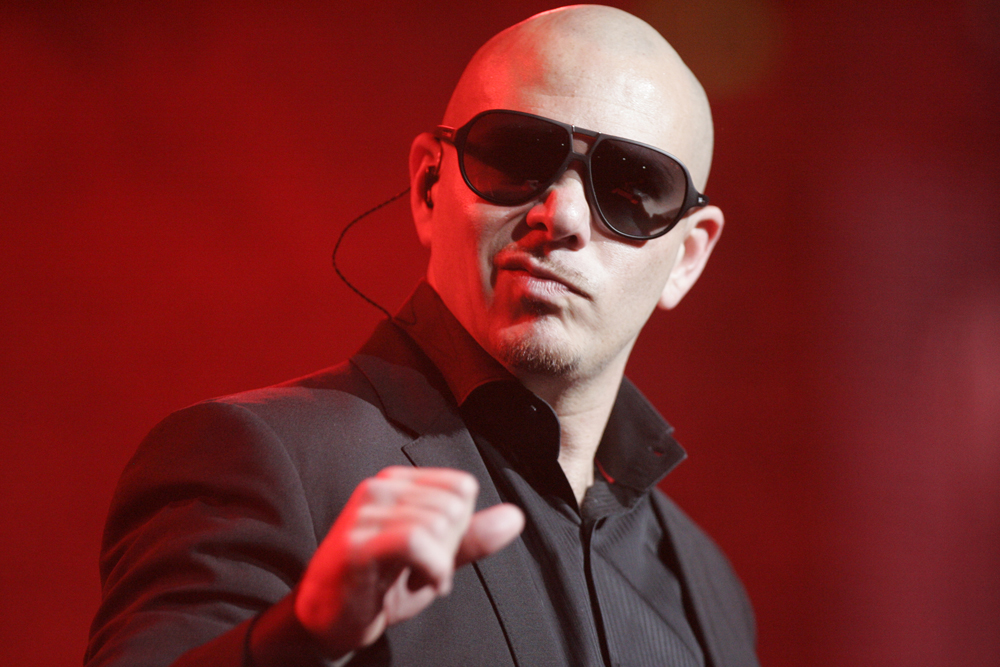
American rapper Pitbull (pictured) is one of the featured artists on the record.

The record was aided by several concert tours in Europe and Japan. It was also the singer's second visit in Japan after a gig in March 2013. The album's first single, "Cola Song" (2014), featured Colombian reggaeton performer J Balvin and was only included on Body and the Sun. An electro house, electronic and Latin recording, "Cola Song" included saxophone and horn in its composition. Commercially, the track experienced success in Europe and was certified Platinum by PROMUSICAE for selling over 40,000 copies in Spain. The second single, "Good Time", was similarly only featured on Body and the Sun, featuring the vocal collaboration of American rapper Pitbull. It is a dance-pop track that uses trumpets and "hedonistic and cheerful" simple lyrics. A SoundCloud Complete Edition of Inna released on 19 November 2020 would eventually also include "Cola Song" and "Good Time".

"Diggy Down" (2014) was released as the third single for the album, sampling a portion of Marian Hill's "Got It" (2015). Musically, it is an R&B-influenced dance-pop love track. The recording reached number one on Romania's Airplay 100, marking the singer's third number one song in the country after "Hot" (2008) and "Amazing" (2009). It also won Best Dance at the 2015 Media Music Awards. After "We Wanna" with Alexandra Stan and Daddy Yankee featured only on certain editions of Inna, "Bop Bop" followed in 2015 as the fifth release. It is a dance-pop song featuring American singer Eric Turner, and reached number two in Romania. The record's last singles, "Yalla" (2015) and "Rendez Vous" (2016), were both moderately successful in Inna's native country. "Yalla" is a dance-pop track sung in English and partially in Arabic language, while "Rendez Vous" samples Mr. President's 1996 recording "Coco Jamboo". "Take Me Higher" is a deep house and pop song, with "Low" being a chillout track about the singer's intimate moments with her suitor that showcases her vocal abilities. Another track from the cancelled Summer Days EP, "Devil's Paradise", is a ballad with synth-pop beats and electronic influences talking about her "ultimate pleasure with her new man", while "Body and the Sun" is a deep house and electropop song, written about Inna missing her man's body.

== Track listing ==
Credits adapted from the liner notes of Inna and Body and the Sun.

Inna – Standard version
No.	Title	Writer(s)	Producer(s)	Length
1.	"Heart Drop"	Marcus Lomax, Jordan Johnson, Stefan Johnson, Clarence Coffee, Scott Gold, Whitney Phillips, Erin Beck, Marcel Botezan, Radu Bolfea, Sebastian Barac	The Monsters and the Strangerz	3:01
2.	"Bamboreea" (featuring J-Son)	Breyan Isaac, Corey Chorus, Sebastian Barac, Marcel Botezan, Andreas Schuller	Axident	3:30
3.	"Bad Boys"	Marcel Botezan, Sebastian Barac, Theea Miculescu	Play & Win	2:46
4.	"Too Sexy"	Andreas Schuller, Sebastian Barac, Radu Bolfea, Corey Gibson, Christopher Fairbrass, Richard Fairbrass, Robert Manzoli, Breyan Isaac, Remee Jackman	Axident	3:17
5.	"Bop Bop" (featuring Eric Turner)	Thomas Troelsen, Marcel Botezan, Sebastian Barac, Carl Bjorsell, Julimar Santos Oliveira, Eric Turner	Thomas Troelsen	3:25
6.	"Rendez Vous"	Thomas Troelsen, Andreas Schuller, Kai Matthiesen, Delroy Rennals, Ilsey Juber, Rainer Gaffrey	Thomas Troelsen, Axident	3:08
7.	"Yalla"	Marcel Botezan, Sebastian Barac, Nadir Tamuz Augustin, Elena Alexandra Apostoleanu	Play & Win	2:49
8.	"Walking on the Sun"	Marcel Botezan, Sebastian Barac, Thomas Troelsen	Marcel Botezan, Sebastian Barac	3:31
9.	"Fool Me"	Marcel Botezan, Sebastian Barac, Eric Turner	Marcel Botezan, Sebastian Barac	3:15
10.	"Body and the Sun"	Andreas Schuller, Thomas Troelsen, Corey Gibson, Sebastian Barac, Radu Bolfea	Axident, Thomas Troelsen	3:28
11.	"Salinas Skies"	Andreas Schuller, Wayne Hector	Axident	3:42
12.	"Devil's Paradise"	Marcel Botezan, Radu Bolfea, Sebastian Barac, Corey Gibson	Play & Win	2:13
13.	"Diggy Down" (featuring Marian Hill)	Marcel Botezan, Radu Bolfea, Sebastian Barac, Ilsey Juber, Marian Hill, Vlad Lucan	Vlad Lucan	3:11
14.	"Low"	Marcel Botezan, Radu Bolfea, Sebastian Barac, Georgia Overton, Erin Beck	Play & Win	3:41
15.	"Tell Me"	Marcel Botezan, Radu Bolfea, Sebastian Barac, Corey Chorus, Breyan Isaac	Play & Win	3:26
16.	"Diggy Down" (Piano Extended)	Marcel Botezan, Radu Bolfea, Sebastian Barac, Ilsey Juber, Marian Hill, Vlad Lucan	Vlad Lucan	2:48
17.	"Sun Goes Up"	Marcel Botezan, Sebastian Barac, Thomas Troelsen, Elena Alexandra Apostoleanu	Marcel Botezan, Sebastian Barac	3:31
18.	"Summer in December" (Morandi featuring Inna)	Marius Moga, Andrei Ştefan	Morandi	3:16
Total length:				48:39

Turkish and Polish bonus track
No.	Title	Writer(s)	Producer(s)	Length
19.	"We Wanna" (with Alexandra Stan featuring Daddy Yankee)	Andreas Schuller, Jacob Luttrell, Thomas Troelsen, Ramon Ayala	Axident, Thomas Troelsen	3:52

Mexican bonus tracks
No.	Title	Length
19.	"We Wanna"	3:52
20.	"Yalla" (A Turk Remix)	3:31
21.	"Yalla" (Deepierro Offir Malol Remix Edit)	3:15
22.	"Yalla" (Dj Asher ScreeN Remix)	3:56

Body and the Sun version
No.	Title	Writer(s)	Producer(s)	Length
1.	"Too Sexy"			3:17
2.	"Bop Bop" (featuring Eric Turner)			3:21
3.	"Rendez Vous"			3:09
4.	"Cola Song" (featuring J Balvin)	Breyan Isaac, Andrew Frampton, Andreas Schuller, José Álvaro Osorio Balvín, Thomas Joseph Rozdilsky	TJR, Axident, J Balvin	3:18
5.	"Yalla"			2:51
6.	"Walking on the Sun"			3:31
7.	"Fool Me"			3:33
8.	"Body and the Sun"			3:29
9.	"Salinas Skies"			3:44
10.	"Devil's Paradise"			2:13
11.	"Diggy Down" (featuring Marian Hill)			3:10
12.	"Low"			3:38
13.	"Tell Me"			3:26
14.	"Diggy Down" (Piano Deluxe)			2:48
15.	"Sun Goes Up"			3:31
16.	"Take Me Higher"	Marcel Botezan, Radu Bolfea, Sebastian Barac	Play & Win	2:58
17.	"Good Time" (featuring Pitbull)	Steve Mac, Ina Wroldsen, Armando C. Perez	Steve Mac	3:23
18.	"Summer in December" (Morandi featuring Inna)			3:16
19.	"Take Me Higher" (Embody Remix)			4:58
Total length:				57:28

Inna Complete Edition bonus tracks
No.	Title	Length
7.	"Cola Song" (featuring J Balvin)
18.	"Take Me Higher"
19.	"Good Time" (featuring Pitbull)
21.	"Summer Days"
Total length:		1:11:35

Sample credits

- "Too Sexy" contains elements from the Right Said Fred recording "I'm Too Sexy" written by Fred Fairbrass, Richard Fairbrass and Rob Manzoli, and produced by TommyD.
- "Rendez Vous" contains elements from the Mr. President recording "Coco Jamboo" written by Kai Matthiesen, Delroy Rennalls and Rainer Gaffrey, and produced by Matthiesen and Gaffrey.

== Charts ==
The record experienced minor commercial success on record charts. In Japan, the Body and the Sun version reached number 157 on the Oricon chart on 17 August 2015, where it spent two weeks. It marked the singer's lowest-selling album in the country, having sold about 760 copies in Japan as of August 2015. Inna further peaked at position 45 on Mexico's AMPROFON chart on the week ending 24 March 2016.

Chart (2015)	Peak position
Japanese Albums (Oricon) Body and the Sun version	157
Mexican Albums (AMPROFON) Inna version	45

== Release history ==
Region	Date	Format	Label
Body and the Sun version
Various	23 July 2015	Digital download	Roton / Empire
Japan	31 July 2015	Digital download	Warner
Japan	5 August 2015	CD	Warner
Inna version
Various	30 October 2015	Digital download	Warner
Turkey	6 November 2015	Digital download	Yeni Dünya
Turkey	29 April 2016	CD	Yeni Dünya
Mexico	11 March 2016	Digital download	Warner
Mexico	25 March 2016	CD	Warner

== See also ==
- List of music released by Romanian artists that has charted in major music markets
