= Crazy Sexy Wild =

Single by Inna

from the album Party Never Ends
- Released: 12 June 2012 ("Tu și eu"); 14 September 2012 ("Crazy Sexy Wild")
- Genre: Dance
- Length: 3:06
- Label: Roton; DIY
- Songwriter(s): Elena Alexandra Apostoleanu; Kimberly Cole; Henri Lanz; Will Rappaport
- Producer(s): Sebastian Barac; Radu Bolfea; Marcel Botezan

Inna singles chronology
"Caliente" (2012)	"Crazy Sexy Wild" (2012)	"Inndia" (2012)

Alternative cover
- "Tu și eu" cover

"Crazy Sexy Wild" is a song recorded by Romanian singer Inna from her third studio album, Party Never Ends (2013). It was digitally released on 14 September 2012 by DIY, while a Romanian-language version titled "Tu și eu" (Romanian: "You and I"/"You and me") was previously made available on 12 June 2012 through Roton. The track was written by Henri Lanz, Kimberly Cole, Will Rappaport and Inna, while production was handled by Sebastian Barac, Radu Bolfea and Marcel Botezan. Musically, it is a dance track featuring 90s sounds in its instrumentation. One music critic compared it to Nicki Minaj's "Starships" (2012).

Reviewers were mostly positive towards the two versions, with them calling "Tu și eu" one of Inna's best songs, but also criticizing it for the lack of originality. To promote the tracks, the same footage was used for a music video for both versions, shot by Edward Aninaru in Los Angeles. The visuals for "Crazy Sexy Wild" and "Tu și eu" was uploaded onto Inna's YouTube channel on 2 August and 7 August 2012, respectively, showing a "love story" between the singer and a street musician. She also performed the tracks on various occasions. Commercially, "Tu și eu" reached number five in Romania, while "Crazy Sexy Wild" peaked at number 49 in Japan.

== Background and composition ==
"Crazy Sexy Wild"
A 20-second sample of "Crazy Sexy Wild", a dance song containing 90s sounds in its instrumentation.

The song — included on Inna's third studio album Party Never Ends (2013) — was written by Henri Lanz, Kimberly Cole, Will Rappaport and the singer, while production was handled by Sebastian Barac, Radu Bolfea and Marcel Botezan. A Romanian-language version of the track, titled "Tu și eu", was first released in Romania on 12 June 2012 by Roton. This was followed by the availability of "Crazy Sexy Wild" in Italy through DIY on 14 September, and on 20 February 2013 in Japan by Roton. The recording is of the dance genre, with Umberto Olivio from Italian portal RnB Junk likening it to Nicki Minaj's "Starships" (2012). Jonathan Hamard, writing for Pure Charts, noticed 90s sounds in its instrumentation.

== Reception ==
Edi from Urban.ro saw "Tu și eu" as one of Inna's best songs, further noting notable airplay in Romania. RnB Junk's Olivio also called it a "cool summer piece" and predicted its commercial success "if supported by a quality video", although criticizing its lack of originality. An editor of Pro FM listed "Tu și eu" in their list of "16 hits with which Inna made history", while Diana Zagrean from Unica similarly mentioned "Crazy Sexy Wild" in her ranking of Romania's 2012 summer hits. Commercially, the Romanian-language version reached number five in Romania in September 2012, Inna's sixth top ten hit in the country, while "Crazy Sexy Wild" peaked at position 49 on the Japan Hot 100 in April 2013, and stayed on the chart for three weeks.

== Promotion ==
Inna performed "Tu și eu" on the roof of a building in Mexico City as part of her "Rock the Roof" series on 3 May 2012. She also sang "Crazy Sexy Wild" in the same location on 22 June 2012, and in Bucharest as part of the same series on 9 August 2012. For further promotion, the same footage was used for the making of music videos for both "Crazy Sexy Wild" and "Tu și eu". Filming was handled by Edward Aninaru in Los Angeles, California, being uploaded onto Inna's official YouTube channel on 2 August and 7 August 2012, respectively.

The visual opens with Inna walking on the beach promenade and spotting a young street musician with his guitar. After she grabs all the banknotes out of his little suitcase and runs away, the musician follows the singer to brace her, but she convinces him to spend all the money. Together they start buying ice cream and stealing clothes in a shop. At sunset, Inna and the musician meet some friends on the beach at a bonfire. After spending the night in a tent on the beach, they secretly ride along on the load space of a pick-up truck the next morning and leave the town. Subsequently, Inna and the man arrive in a desert and hitch a ride by holding a sign reading "Anywhere". After getting a ride, they leave the car on a motel next to the road, where Inna enters to sing on a stage. The singer then tries to make a phone call, with the musician flirting with a blond girl at the bar. Inna kisses her on the mouth and then chooses a jukebox track. This is followed by the singer and him renting a room for the night. As the man falls asleep on the bed, Inna looks through the window; she leaves the motel room early in the morning, leaving him to wake up alone with a bill reading "Anywhere" on his chest. Urban.ro thought the music video portrayed a "love story" between Inna and the musician, while Hamard from Pure Charts criticized it for not being "exciting" and "innovative", asking, "But finally, should we expect more from Inna?"

== Track listing ==
- Digital download – Tu și eu
1. Tu și eu (Radio Edit With Intro) – 3:06
2. Tu și eu (Radio Edit) – 3:06
- Digital download – Crazy Sexy Wild
1. "Crazy Sexy Wild" (Radio Edit) – 3:06

== Credits and personnel ==
Credits adapted from the liner notes of Party Never Ends.

- Inna – lead vocals, composer
- Sebastian Barac – producer
- Radu Bolfea – producer
- Marcel Botezan – producer
- Henri Lanz – composer
- Kimberly Cole – composer
- Will Rappaport – composer

== Charts ==
Charts (2012–13)	Position
Japan (Japan Hot 100) "Crazy Sexy Wild" version	49
Romania (Airplay 100) "Tu și eu" version	5

== Release history ==
Region	Date	Format	Label
"Tu și eu" version
Romania	12 June 2012	Digital download	Roton
"Crazy Sexy Wild" version
Italy	14 September 2012	Digital download	DIY
Japan	20 February 2013	Digital download	Roton

== See also ==
- List of music released by Romanian artists that has charted in major music markets
