= Be My Lover (Inna song) =

Single by Inna or remix featuring Juan Magán

from the album Party Never Ends (Deluxe edition)
- Released: 26 July 2013
- Recorded: 2012
- Genre: Dubstep; electro dance; club; house
- Length: 3:32 (Solo version); 3:35 (featuring Juan Magan)
- Label: Roton
- Songwriter(s): Uli Brenner; Lane McCray; Gerd Amir Saraf; Melanie Thornton
- Producer(s): Afrojack; METI

Inna or remix featuring Juan Magán singles chronology
"More than Friends" (2013)	"Be My Lover" (2013)	"In Your Eyes" (2013)

"Be My Lover" is a song recorded by Romanian singer Inna for the deluxe edition of her third studio album, Party Never Ends (2013). It was released on 26 July 2013 through Roton. The track was written by Uli Brenner, Lane McCray, Gerd Amir Saraf and Melanie Thornton, with production handled by Afrojack and METI. Musically, "Be My Lover" encompasses dubstep, electro dance, club and house genres, sampling the 1995 song of the same name by La Bouche, for which Brenner, McCray, Saraf and Thornton received writing credits.

Music critics praised the song's energy and commercial appeal, calling it suitable for clubs. To promote the track, an accompanying music video was uploaded onto Inna's official YouTube channel on 11 July 2013, featuring the singer in the middle of a huge crowd. Scenes also showed Orban Gabor, a contestant from the third season of Romanian talent show Românii au talent, doing bike stunts. A remix of "Be My Lover" featuring Juan Magán was released on 26 September 2013. Commercially, the recording reached number 33 and 26 on the Wallonian and Polish dance charts, respectively.

== Background and release ==
"Be My Lover" was written by Uli Brenner, Lane McCray, Gerd Amir Saraf and Melanie Thornton, with production handled by Afrojack and METI. It was included on the deluxe edition of Inna's third studio album, Party Never Ends (2013). The song was released on 26 July 2013 by Roton, followed by the availability of a four-remix digital extended play (EP) on 20 August 2013. That same month, "Be My Lover" was added to Radio Eska's Hot 20 playlist. A remix featuring Juan Magán was made available on 26 September 2013, marking their second collaboration after Inna's "Un Momento" (2011). Julien Goncalves from Pure Charts suggested that this version was intended for the Spanish audience.

== Composition and reception ==
"Be My Lover"
A 22-second sample of "Be My Lover", a dubstep, electro dance, club and house song which samples La Bouche's 1995 single of the same name.

"Be My Lover" is a dubstep, electro dance, club and house song featuring "energetic sounds" and a sample from La Bouche's 1995 single of the same name. Brenner, McCray, Saraf and Thornton therefore received writing credits.

Upon its release, music critics gave positive reviews of "Be My Lover". Yohann Ruelle from Pure Charts described the track as a "rhythmic summer song". Raluca Tanasă from InfoMusic called "Be My Lover" suitable for clubs, further writing that it feeds a "pungent energy, inviting the audience to dance and fun", and had potential to be a summer hit. Spanish website Coveralia said that "the choice of the single is not ordinary". Commercially, the recording achieved minor success on record charts, peaking at number 33 on Belgium's Ultratop dance component chart in Wallonia and at number 26 on the Polish Dance Top 50.

== Music video ==
An online video was first released on 27 February 2013, showing Inna skating in a leotard with an American flag design. This was followed by the official music video, which was uploaded onto Inna's YouTube channel on 11 July 2013. A version with Magan was also released on 17 September 2013, containing shots of him rapping in front of a white backdrop. Both clips feature Orban Gabor, a cyclist and contestant on the third season of Romanian talent show Românii au talent.

The music video commences with Inna and background dancers dancing in a desert, following which the singer stands in the middle of a huge crowd, with confetti falling from the sky; shots of three women performing synchronized choreography are occasionally shown. Subsequently, Gabor is shown doing bike stunts. The clip continues in a similar style and ends with a shot of the desert from the opening scene. Pure Charts' Ruelle wrote that the music video was similar to Inna's past material, concluding, "No doubt, the beauty has lost none of its charm."

== Track listing ==
- Digital download 1
1. "Be My Lover" – 3:32
- Digital download 2
1. "Be My Lover" (feat. Juan Magan) [Radio Edit] – 3:35
- Digital remixes EP
1. "Be My Lover" (Adi Perez Remix) – 5:22
2. "Be My Lover" (Adi Perez Remix Edit) – 3:52
3. "Be My Lover" (Salvatore Ganacci Remix) – 5:18
4. "Be My Lover" (Salvatore Ganacci Remix Edit) – 3:02

== Credits and personnel ==
Credits adapted from the liner notes of Party Never Ends.

- Inna – lead vocals
- Afrojack – producer
- Uli Brenner – composer
- METI – producer
- Lane McCray – composer
- Gerd Amir Saraf – composer
- Melanie Thornton – composer

== Charts ==
Chart (2013)	Peak position
Belgium Dance (Ultratop Wallonia)	33
Poland (Dance Top 50)	26

== Release history ==
Region	Date	Format	Label
Europe	26 July 2013	Digital download	Roton
United States	30 July 2013	Digital download	Atlantic
Sweden	2013	Promotional CD single	Catchy Tunes
