= Party Never Ends =

Studio album by Inna
- Released: 4 March 2013
- Genre: EDM
- Languages: English; Romanian; Spanish
- Label: Roton
- Producers: Sameer Agrawal; DJ Frank E; Orange Factory; Emile Ghantous; Keith Hetrick; Steve Mac; Vlad Lucan; Tierce Person; DJ Smash; Play & Win

Inna chronology
I Am the Club Rocker (2011)	Party Never Ends (2013)	Inna (2015)

Singles from Party Never Ends
- 1. "Caliente" Released: 4 May 2012; 2. "Crazy Sexy Wild" Released: 14 September 2012; 3. "Inndia" Released: 11 October 2012; 4. "More than Friends" Released: 23 January 2013; 5. "Be My Lover" Released: 26 July 2013; 6. "In Your Eyes" Released: 3 December 2013

Party Never Ends is the third studio album recorded by Romanian singer Inna, released on 4 March 2013 by Roton, and re-issued on 14 October 2014, by Atlantic Records in the US. The singer collaborated with several producers on the record, including DJ Frank E, Orange Factory, Steve Mac, Lucas Secon, DJ Smash and Play & Win. Party Never Ends has been described as approaching dance music and its subgenres, with influences varying from Latin, hip hop and house to electropop, salsa and dubstep. The Times of India gave the album a mixed review; while commending some tracks, other were deemed passable or mediocre.

Commercially, Party Never Ends charted at number 88 on the Japanese Oricon album chart and at number 10 on Mexico's AMPROFON chart, while selling 6,967 copies in Japan as of June 2013. Six tracks from the record were released as singles, of which "More than Friends" experienced widespread commercial success. Additionally, five promotional singles were also made available. To promote Party Never Ends, Inna embarked on tours in Mexico and the United States. Her outfits were inspired by Mexican culture and Mexican painter Frida Kahlo. During promotional endeavors, she appeared in several television programmes and radio stations.

== Background and release ==
The songs from Party Never Ends have been recorded in London, Mexico, Bucharest, Copenhagen and Los Angeles, while contributors include: Steve Mac, DJ Frank E, Play & Win, SoFly and Nius, Lucas Secon, The Insomniax, Thomas Troelsen, Orange Factory, Shermanology, Ina Wroldsen, Wayne Hector and Ameerah. The album was released on 4 March 2013 by Roton. The artwork—portraying a topless Inna embracing herself—was shot by Khaled Mokhtar, while photography was done by Gabi Hirit. The deluxe edition of Party Never Ends contains the single "Be My Lover", while the Romanian bonus tracks edition features her Romanian language promotional single "Spre mare" (2013) and her collaboration with Moldavian musical project Carla's Dreams on "P.O.H.U.I.". An American edition of the record, issued by Atlantic Records on 14 October 2014, incorporates the singles "Good Time" (2014) and "Cola Song" (2014), along with album track "Take Me Higher" from her fourth studio album Body and the Sun (2015). The Ultimate Edition of Party Never Ends, issued to SoundCloud on 21 October 2020, further included the single "Eveybody" (2013) with DJ BoBo and the promotional single "Oare" (2012).

== Composition ==
According to The Times of India, "Party Never Ends" mainly features songs oriented to dance music and its subgenres. The record has Inna singing in English, Spanish and Romanian. It opens with "In Your Eyes", a Latin-influenced dance and hip hop song, followed by "More than Friends", which serves as the third track and belongs to the house and Latin genres. "Live Your Life" and "Crazy Sexy Wild" are both dance recordings, with the latter one incorporating 1990s sounds in its instrumentation. "Inndia" has been described as oriental, with "Shining Star" being an electropop and dance song. "Caliente" is a 1990s-inspired dance and salsa song dedicated to her Mexican fans. The deluxe edition track "Be My Lover" features multiple genres: dubstep, electro dance, club and house, along with a sample of La Bouche's 1995 single of the same name. Another track on the album, "Tonight" is a cover of the Alexandra Burke recording of the same name, from her album Heartbreak on Hold (2012).

== Reception and accolades ==
Professional ratings
Review scores
Source	Rating
The Times of India	3/5 stars

Reagan Gavin Rasquinha, writing for The Times of India, gave Party Never Ends three out of five stars. In a more mixed review, he described the album as "more like a collection of individual dance tracks rather than a cohesive body of music". He went on commending "In Your Eyes" as radio-friendly, "Live Your Life", "Caliente" and "More than Friends", while criticizing "Inndia" for being passable and "Shining Star" as mediocre.

Commercially, Party Never Ends peaked at number 88 on the Japanese Oricon albums chart on the week ending 27 March 2013, spending 10 weeks on the chart. As of June 2013, the album has sold 6,967 copies in the country, while a Japan-only reissue—Party Never Ends 2—peaked at number 152 and moved 913 copies. On Mexico's AMPROFON chart, the record reached number 10 on 16 March 2013. Party Never Ends was nominated in the Best Album category at both the 2013 and 2014 Romanian Music Awards, but lost to Deepcentral's album O stea (2013) and Smiley's record Acasă (2013), respectively.

== Promotion and singles ==
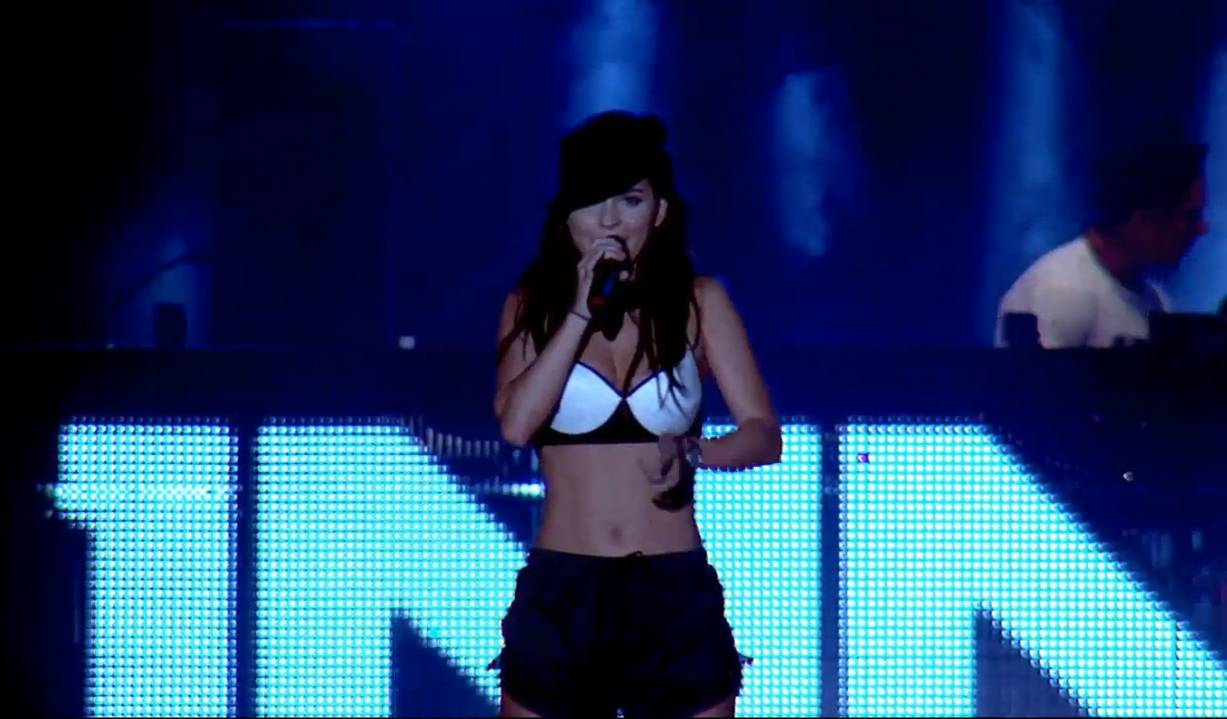
Inna during the Barbarella 2013 festival in the Dominican Republic.

To promote Party Never Ends, a series of concerts were held in Norway in November 2012. The record was further promoted by a tour in the United States in Detroit, New York, Chicago, Washington, D.C., and Los Angeles. During another tour in Mexico, Inna visited Mexico City, Leon, Chihuahua, Ciudad Juarez and a festival in Acapulco. When choosing her wardrobe, the singer was inspired by Mexican culture and Mexican painter Frida Kahlo. The final concert at the Auditorio Nacional was sold out, with an attendance of 10,000 people. During promotional endeavors, the singer also had appearances on television and radio stations, and attended an autograph session with over 1,500 fans.

"Caliente" was released as the first single from Party Never Ends on 4 May 2012, reaching the top 100 of the charts in Italy and Romania. This was followed by the premiere of "Tu și eu" on 12 June and its international version "Crazy Sexy Wild" on 14 September 2014. The first version peaked at number five on Romania's Airplay 100, while the latter one reached the top 50 in Japan. The subsequent single, "Inndia" in collaboration with Romanian trio Play & Win, similarly reached the top 10 in Inna's native country. "More than Friends", the project's fourth release, featured guest vocals by Puerto Rican reggaeton performer Daddy Yankee and was a top 40 hit in Romania, Slovakia, Spain and the Polish dance chart. It was certified by the Productores de Música de España (PROMUSICAE) for video streams of four million in Spain. Two last singles were released from Party Never Ends, "Be My Lover" on 26 July and "In Your Eyes" on 3 December 2013 to minor success; the latter featured Puerto Rican performer Yandel.

Multiple promotional singles were released to support the premiere of the album: "Ok", "Alright", "J'adore", "Spre mare" and "Dame Tu Amor". Commercially, "Ok" peaked at number 185 on France's SNEP chart and "Spre mare" at position 19 in Romania. "Dame Tu Amor" features the guest contribution of Mexican band Reik. All singles benefited of at least one music video, including a lyric video for "J'Adore".

== Track listing ==
Party Never Ends – International version
No.	Title	Writer(s)	Producer(s)	Length
1.	"In Your Eyes"	Steve Mac; Ina Wroldsen	Mac	2:45
2.	"We Like to Party"	Wayne Hector; Wroldsen	Sebastian Barac; Radu Bolfea; Marcel Botezan	3:50
3.	"More than Friends" (featuring Daddy Yankee)	Justin Franks; Tierce Person; Thomas Troelsen	DJ Frank E; Person	3:57
4.	"Fall in Love/Lie"	Elena Alexandra Apostoleanu; Kingsley Brown; Penny Elizabeth Foster; Andrei Prodan; Claudiu Ursache	Vlad Lucan	3:56
5.	"Shining Star"	Andy Shearman; Dorothy Shearman; Leon Shearman	Barac; Bolfea; Botezan	2:50
6.	"Take Me Down to Mexico"	Sameer Agrawal; Keith Hetrick; Aimée Proal	Sameer Agrawal; Emile Ghantous; Keith Hetrick	4:08
7.	"Famous"	Apostoleanu; Ameerah Roelants; Khaled Rohaim; Jeremy Skaller	Orange Factory	3:30
8.	"Take It Off"	Don McLean; Lucas Secon	Secon	3:28
9.	"Tonight"	Troelsen; Secon	DJ Smash; Secon	3:41
10.	"J'adore"	Wroldsen	Barac; Bolfea; Botezan	3:15
11.	"Caliente"	Apostoleanu	Barac; Bolfea; Botezan	3:21
12.	"Crazy Sexy Wild"	Apostoleanu; Kimberly Cole; Henri Lanz; Will Rappaport	Barac; Bolfea; Botezan	3:06
13.	"Inndia" (featuring Play & Win)	Barac; Bolfea; Botezan; Joddie Connor	Barac; Bolfea; Botezan	3:34
14.	"Ok"	Apostoleanu; Barac; Bolfea; Botezan	Barac; Bolfea; Botezan	3:22
15.	"Live Your Life"	Barac; Bolfea; Botezan; Shahmir Yasmin	Barac; Bolfea; Botezan	3:07
16.	"Party Never Ends"	A. Shearman; D. Shearman; L. Shearman	Barac; Bolfea; Botezan	3:12

Party Never Ends – Deluxe edition
No.	Title	Length
1.	"Be My Lover"	3:32
2.	"World of Love"	3:37
3.	"I Like You"	3:20
4.	"Dame Tu Amor" (featuring Reik)	3:14
5.	"Alright"	3:50
6.	"Tu si Eu"	3:07
7.	"Light Up" (featuring Reik)	3:14

Sample credits

- "Tonight" samples the Alexandra Burke recording of the same name, written by Burke, DJ Samsh, Antoine Konrad, Fabio Antoniali, Secon, Pablo Rodriguez and Troelsen, and produced by Secon and DJ Smash.
- "Be My Lover" samples the La Bouche recording of the same name, written by Melanie Thornton, Uli Brenner, Gerd Amir Saraf and Lane McCray, and produced by Frank Farian, Brenner and Saraf.

American version (Atlantic Records reissue)
No.	Title	Length
1.	"In Your Eyes"	2:45
2.	"Cola Song" (featuring J Balvin)	3:18
3.	"Good Time" (featuring Pitbull)	3:23
4.	"Fall in Love / Lie"	3:56
5.	"Shining Star"	2:50
6.	"Tonight"	3:41
7.	"J'Adore"	3:15
8.	"Caliente"	3:21
9.	"Crazy Sexy Wild"	3:06
10.	"Inndia" (featuring Play & Win)	3:34
11.	"Ok"	3:22
12.	"Party Never Ends"	3:12
13.	"We Like to Party"	3:50
14.	"More than Friends" (featuring Daddy Yankee)	3:57
15.	"Take Me Higher"	3:00

== Charts ==
Chart performance for Party Never Ends
Chart (2013)	Peak position
Japanese Albums (Oricon)	88
Mexican Albums (AMPROFON)	10

== Release history ==
Release history and formats for Party Never Ends
Region	Date	Format	Label
Romania	4 March 2013	Digital download	Roton
Romania	26 March 2013	CD	Global/ Roton
Mexico	26 March 2013	CD	Mucha Mas; Música/Roton
Poland	26 March 2013	CD	Magic
Russia	N/A 2013	CD	Art Optimum
Serbia	N/A 2013	CD	Mascom
United Kingdom	28 July 2013	Digital download	3Beat
United States	14 October 2014	Digital download	Atlantic

== See also ==
- List of music released by Romanian artists that has charted in major music markets
