= In Your Eyes (Inna song) =

Single by Inna featuring Yandel

from the album Party Never Ends
- Released: 3 December 2013
- Studio: Rokstone Studios (London, United Kingdom)
- Genre: Latin; hip hop
- Length: 2:45 (Solo version); 3:17 (featuring Yandel)
- Label: Roton
- Songwriter(s): Steve Mac; Llandel Veguilla; Ina Wroldsen
- Producer(s): Mac

Inna singles chronology
"Be My Lover" (2013)	"In Your Eyes" (2013)	"Cola Song" (2014)

Yandel singles chronology
"Hasta Abajo" (2013)	"In Your Eyes" (2013)	"Moviendo Caderas" (2014)

"In Your Eyes" is a song recorded by Romanian singer Inna for her third studio album, Party Never Ends (2013). It was released on 3 November 2013 through Roton, featuring the vocal collaboration of Puerto Rican reggaeton performer Yandel. The track–recorded at the Rokstone Studios–was written by Steve Mac, Yandel and Ina Wroldsen, while production was solely handled by Mac. Musically, "In Your Eyes" is inspired by Latin music and encompasses a hip hop style because of Yandel's contribution.

Music critics praised the song's catchiness and called it suitable for night clubs. "In Your Eyes" was also nominated for an award in the Pop/Dance Song of the Year category at the 2014 Radio România Actualități Awards. To promote the track, an accompanying music video was shot by Barna Nemethi in Bucharest and Miami, uploaded onto Inna's official YouTube channel on 16 October 2013. It makes use of neon colors and features pole dance, with reviewers comparing it to the visual of Rihanna's "Pour It Up" (2013). The singer also performed "In Your Eyes" on various occasions. Commercially, it reached the top 50 in Turkey, Poland, Spain and Romania.

== Background and release ==
"In Your Eyes" was written by Steve Mac, Yandel and Ina Wroldsen, while production was solely handled by Mac. The track was recorded and mixed at the Rokstone Studios in London by Chris Laws, with engineering done by Laws and Dann Pursey. Additional piano and synthesizers were played by Steve Mac, with Laws on drums. A solo version of the song was featured on Inna's third studio album Party Never Ends (2013). In an interview with Ruta Latina in August 2013, Inna confirmed that "In Your Eyes" would be released as a single, however without mentioning Yandel's contribution. The single was finally first made available for digital download on 3 December 2013 by Roton. It was eventually added to Radio Eska's Hot 20 playlist later that month.

== Composition and reception ==
"In Your Eyes"
A 20-second sample of "In Your Eyes", a Latin-influenced song featuring hip hop through Yandel's contribution.

"In Your Eyes" has a fast pace, dance rhythm and is influenced by Latin music. Through his contribution, Yandel adds hip hop to the track. The instrumentation of the recording features "loose Romania-House beats" and harmonies. Tobias Moland from Dance Charts described "In Your Eyes" as catchy, further praising Inna's vocals. A Tophit editor wrote that the song was "full of freedom and desire", calling it suitable for night clubs. Reagan Gavin Rasquinh from The Times of India believed "In Your Eyes" was the catchiest track from Party Never Ends, although he found the chorus to be a "silly bit overdubbed". The recording received a nomination in the Pop/Dance Song of the Year category at the 2014 Radio România Actualități Awards.

Commercially, the track debuted on Romania's Airplay 100 at number 78 on the week ending 3 November 2013, peaking at number 44 on 8 December 2013. In Russia, the track reached number 155, staying seven weeks on the Tophit chart, while also peaking at position 23 on Poland's Dance Top 50. "In Your Eyes" was moderately successful in Spain, where it debuted at number 48 and reached number 31, spending eight weeks. Turkey marks the country where the song achieved its highest ranking, at number 15.

== Music video ==
Shot from the music video, showcasing its use of neon and water effects. This and other aspects led its visual being likened to Rihanna's "Pour It Up" (2013).

An accompanying music video for "In Your Eyes" was shot by Barna Nemethi in late August 2013 in Bucharest, with John Perez acting as the director of photography. It was uploaded onto Inna's official YouTube channel on 16 October 2013. Scenes with Yandel were filmed separately in Miami in early September 2013. According to Nemethi, the concept of the clip is "simple" and "minimal", with it being influenced by Springbreakers (2013) and material by Die Antwoord.

The music video commences with Inna wearing a pink leotard, following which she and other women practice pole dancing. Subsequently, the singer appears in black hotpants and a blonde blouse in front of a neon-lightened X sign in the background, flirting with one male. For the first refrain, she and her background dancers perform hand choreography. Following this, Inna and others are seen on what appears to be a runaway, with rain coming out from above; similar neon signs are shown in the background. After Yandel's cameo appearance, the video ends with Inna and her dancers further performing to the track. Cut scenes show the singer dancing and performing a slut drop in front of a wet glass surface.

Pure Charts' Yohann Ruelle called the music video "sexy", likening it to that of Rihanna's "Pour It Up" (2013) for the use of light outfits, pole dance sequences and the "play of light, between mist and sensual neon". Alexandra Necula from InfoMusic echoed Ruelle's thought, further noting the use of water effects in both clips. An editor of Libertatea wrote, "The singer appears little dressed, exposing her perfect body. One of the hottest scenes is where Inna appears with a blonde blouse that leaves a part of her breasts in sight to incite the imagination of those who will see the video."

== Live performances ==
On 5 November 2013, Inna uploaded a video on YouTube where she was performing "In Your Eyes" on the roof of a building in Venice Beach as part of her "Rock the Roof" series. For the eighth season of Romanian talent show Te cunosc de undeva!, Romanian singers Raluka and Alex Velea impersonated Inna and Yandel, respectively, while performing the song. Inna also provided a live performance of the recording at the World Trade Center Mexico.

== Track listing ==
Official versions (Note: This acts as a summary of all versions of the single found on Party Never Ends and its digital releases.)

1. "In Your Eyes" – 2:45
2. "In Your Eyes" (featuring Yandel) – 3:17
3. "In Your Eyes" (featuring Yandel) [Extended version] – 5:17
4. "In Your Eyes" (Adi Perez Remix Edit) – 4:09

== Credits and personnel ==
Credits adapted from the liner notes of Party Never Ends and the official music video.

=== Recording ===
- Recorded at Rokstone Studios, London, United Kingdom

=== Personnel ===
- Chris Laws – drums, engineering, mixing
- Steve Mac – composer, producer, piano, synthesizers
- Dan Pursey – engineering
- Llandel Veguilla – composer
- Ina Wroldsen – composer

== Charts ==
Chart (2013–2014)	Peak position
CIS (Tophit)	155
Poland (Dance Top 50)	23
Romania (Airplay 100)	44
Spain (PROMUSICAE)	31
Turkey (Number One Top 20)	15

== Release history ==
Region	Date	Format	Label
Romania	3 December 2013	Digital download	Roton
Italy	5 December 2013	Digital download	DIY
Italy	6 December 2013	Radio airplay	DIY
Spain	10 December 2013	Digital download	Blanco y Negro
United States	17 December 2013	Digital download	Ultra

== See also ==
- List of music released by Romanian artists that has charted in major music markets
