= Tu și eu =

Tu și eu may refer to:

- "Tu și eu", Romanian language version of "Crazy Sexy Wild" (2012) by Inna
- "Tu și eu", 2017 song by Carla's Dreams and Inna
