= Caliente (Inna song) =

Single by Inna

from the album Party Never Ends
- Released: 4 May 2012
- Length: 3:21
- Label: Roton
- Songwriter: Elena Alexandra Apostoleanu
- Producers: Sebastian Barac; Radu Bolfea; Marcel Botezan

Inna singles chronology
"Wow" (2012)	"Caliente" (2012)	"Crazy Sexy Wild" (2012)

"Caliente" is a song recorded by Romanian singer Inna for her third studio album, Party Never Ends (2013). It was released on 4 May 2012 through Roton. The track was written by the singer, while production was handled by Sebastian Barac, Radu Bolfea and Marcel Botezan. "Caliente" features lyrics in Spanish, marking Inna's first song in that language. It is a salsa and 90s dance music-influenced song.

Music critics gave mixed reviews of the song, with one praising its dance style and another one criticizing it as mediocre. To promote the track, an accompanying music video was shot by both Hamid Bechiri and John Perez in Costa Rica, the Caribbean Sea and the Pacific Ocean. It was uploaded onto Inna's official YouTube channel on 13 May 2012 and features the appearance of Brazilian model and disc jockey Jesus Luz. The singer performed "Caliente" twice at the World Trade Center Mexico City in 2012 and 2016. Commercially, it reached number 84 in Romania and position 99 in Italy.

== Background and composition ==
"Caliente"
A 20-second sample of "Caliente", a salsa and 1990s dance music-inspired song. It features lyrics in Spanish language.

"Caliente" was composed by Inna, while production was handled by Sebastian Barac, Radu Bolfea and Marcel Botezan. In an interview, the singer said that she wrote the song especially for her Mexican fans. She had previously promised to release a track in Spanish at a concert in the country in 2011; "Caliente" marks her first track in Spanish. It was digitally released on 4 May 2012 by Roton in Romania, with its availability in Italy following on 24 May 2012 through DIY. A digital remixes EP was also published.

"Caliente" is a song inspired by salsa and 1990s dance music. Regarding its style, Inna confessed in an interview with Pure Charts, "I think it is very good to update the 90s. But we also find something new on each track, original sounds that are unique to me." Italian publication RnB Junk noticed that the beat was similar to her previous work, while also writing that the track showed "a sensual and Latin" side of the singer. "Caliente" begins, translated in English, with the lines "Your love is hot/Your love is hot/I want to dream with you, my love".

== Reception ==
Upon its release, "Caliente" received mixed reviews from music critics. Jonathan Hamard from Pure Charts called the song mediocre both musically and visually, while Spanish portal Excite said that the track "makes [them] dance in the long summer nights". Commercially, it experienced minor success on record charts. The recording entered Romania's Airplay 100 chart at number 93 on 27 May 2012, peaking at number 84 on the chart on 17 June 2012. It spent eight weeks on the chart, exceeding on 22 July 2012. "Caliente" also reached position 99 on the Italian FIMI chart on the week ending 10 June 2012.

== Promotion ==
Inna performed the song on the roof of a building in Mexico City on 25 June 2012 as part of her "Rock the Roof" series, and at the World Trade Center Mexico City in September 2012 along with other material from I Am the Club Rocker. The singer also performed "Caliente" in the same location four years later. An accompanying music video for "Caliente" was uploaded onto Inna's official YouTube channel on 13 May 2012. It was filmed by both Hamid Bechiri and John Perez at a beach and waterfall in Costa Rica, the Caribbean Sea and the Pacific Ocean in early April 2012 during a span of three days, featuring Brazilian model and disc jockey Jesus Luz. The artists have previously met in a concert in Russia.

The visual starts with Luz getting out of a body of water, followed by Inna swimming and her posing in front of rocks wearing a black bathing suit. She is also shown sporting a silver petticoat, and Luz appears to run to her through the waves. Subsequently, he secretly watches the singer behind a rock before both are presented standing close to each other. The music video continues in a similar style and ends with Inna running to the water wearing black clothing. Cut scenes show her and Luz climbing rocks and posing at the camera. Spanish website Coverlia called the clip a "paradisiac video", further praising Inna's looks. Portal Excite compared it to the visual of Jennifer Lopez's "I'm Into You" (2011), with Revista Tango labelling it as "erotic".

== Track listing ==
- Digital download
1. Caliente (Radio Edit) – 3:21
- Italian digital download
1. Caliente (Radio Edit) – 3:22
2. Caliente (Miss Kailly Radio Edit Remix) – 3:02
3. Caliente (Steve Roberts Radio Edit Remix) – 2:41
4. Caliente (Extended version) – 4:20
5. Caliente (Miss Kailly Remix) – 5:35
6. Caliente (Steve Roberts Extended Remix) – 4:02
7. Caliente (Starz Angels M*** F#*! Remix) – 6:49
8. Caliente (Protoxic Club Mix) – 6:09
- Digital remixes EP
1. Caliente (Radio Edit) – 3:21
2. Caliente (Extended version) – 4:18
3. Caliente (Miss Kailly Remix) – 5:32
4. Caliente (Starz Angels M*** F#*! Remix) – 6:48
5. Caliente (Steve Roberts Extended Remix) – 4:00
6. Caliente (Steve Roberts Radio Edit Remix) – 2:39
7. Caliente (Protoxic Club Mix) – 6:07

== Credits and personnel ==
Credits adapted from the liner notes of Party Never Ends.

- Inna – lead vocals, composer
- Sebastian Barac – producer
- Radu Bolfea – producer
- Marcel Botezan – producer

== Charts ==
2012 chart performance for "Caliente"
Chart (2012)	Peak position
Italy (FIMI)	99
Romania Airplay (Media Forest)	84

2025–2026 chart performance for "Caliente"
Chart (2025–2026)	Peak position
Greece International (IFPI)	39
Lithuania (AGATA)	70
Ukraine Airplay (TopHit)	64

== Release history ==
Region	Date	Format	Label
Romania	4 May 2012	Digital download	Roton
Italy	24 May 2012	Digital download	DIY

== See also ==
- List of music released by Romanian artists that has charted in major music markets
