= More than Friends (Inna song) =

Single by Inna featuring Daddy Yankee

from the album Party Never Ends
- Released: 23 January 2013
- Genre: House; Latin
- Length: 4:00
- Label: Roton
- Songwriters: Justin Franks; Thomas Troelsen; Tierce Person
- Producers: DJ Frank E; Person

Inna singles chronology
"Inndia" (2012)	"More than Friends" (2013)	"Be My Lover" (2013)

Daddy Yankee singles chronology
"Limbo" (2012)	"More than Friends" (2013)	"La Nueva y La Ex" (2013)

"More than Friends" is a song recorded by Romanian singer Inna from her third studio album, Party Never Ends (2013). It was released on 23 January 2013 through Roton, featuring the vocal collaboration of Puerto Rican reggaeton performer Daddy Yankee. The track was written by Justin Franks, Thomas Troelsen and Tierce Person, while production was handled by DJ Frank E and Person. Musically, "More than Friends" is a house and Latin song that uses an accordion serving as one of its main instruments, along with a catchy beat.

Music critics praised the song's commercial appeal and vocals, but criticized its release process. To promote the track, two accompanying music videos–one for the solo version and one for the version of the track featuring Yankee–were shot by Edward Aninaru in Venice Beach, Los Angeles, being uploaded onto Inna's official YouTube channel on 18 January and 4 February 2013, respectively. They show Inna at the beach and residing at a pool, with one reviewer comparing the imagery to American action drama series Baywatch. The singer also performed "More than Friends" on various occasions. Commercially, it reached the top 20 in some countries including Poland, Romania and Spain, and was certified Gold in Spain for streaming four million copies.

== Background and composition ==
"More than Friends"
"More than Friends" is a house and Latin song, featuring an accordion in its instrumentation.

"More than Friends" was written by Justin Franks, Thomas Troelsen and Tierce Person, while production was handled by DJ Frank E and Person. Although the song was credited for sampling Pitbull, Akon and David Rush's "Everybody Fucks" (2012), plagiarism accusations were made. Musically, "More than Friends" is a house and Latin track, featuring an accordion in its instrumentation. An editor writing for Pure People noted that with the lyric "Tonight, we should be more than friends", Inna promises her suitor a "crazy night". Kevin Apaza, writing for Direct Lyrics, described "More than Friends" as a "summery tune", while The Times of India's Reagan Gavin Rasquinha noted "a Caribbean easy feel to it".

== Critical and commercial reception ==
Apaza from Direct Lyrics called "More than Friends" a "European smash", but questioned its release process, "It's January, it's cold, so why didn't Inna wait till like July to unleash 'More Than Friends'?". Julien Goncalves of Pure Charts noted the song's commercial appeal. The Times of India's Gavin Rasquinha wrote, "If you like house music with catchy beats and strong vocals, give this one a whirl." Commercially, "More than Friends" reached number 20 in native Romania, number 52 in Italy and number 92 in France. The record spent 25 weeks on Spain's PROMUSICAE chart, debuting at number 30 in April 2013 and peaking at position seven in August 2013. It was also certified Gold by the same organisation for 20,000 copies sold. "More than Friends" further reached the top ten in Bulgaria, Slovakia and the Polish dance chart.

== Music video ==
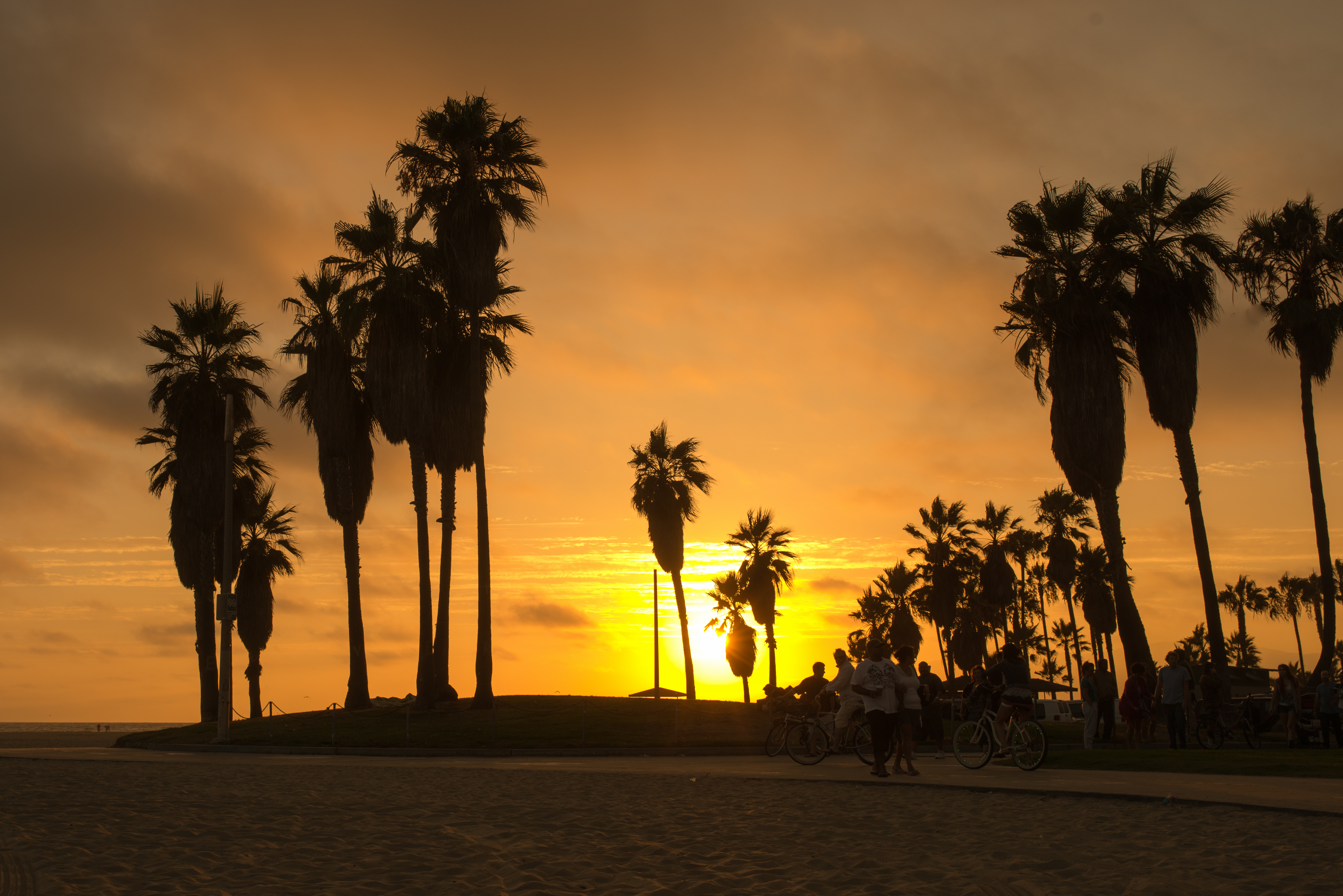
The accompanying music videos were shot in Venice Beach, Los Angeles (pictured).

A teaser for the music video was released on 15 January 2013. The full version was then uploaded onto Inna's official YouTube channel with both a previously unreleased solo version and a version with Daddy Yankee on 18 January and 4 February 2013, respectively. Both versions were shot by Edward Aninaru at Venice Beach in Los Angeles.

The visual opens with shots of the beach, followed by the appearance of five males with surfboards in their hands. Inna is then shown dancing to the song in a pink-black bathing suit and winks to the surfers along with other females. Subsequently, the singer resides at a pool with a disc jockey, where people party and fight with water guns. After Yankee's guest cameo and shots of a party at night are shown, the video ends with Inna and a man that appeared in the beginning walking into the sunset at the beach. Cut scenes show Yankee rapping in different locations, Inna dancing to the track at sunset, and her taking a shower. Direct Lyrics' Apaza commended the music video and wrote that Inna portrayed a "California girl" in the clip. He also likened the plot of the visual to the lyrical message of Kesha's "Die Young" (2013), "'like we're gonna die young' style". Purepeople compared the imagery of the visual to American action drama series Baywatch.

== Live performances ==
Inna performed a stripped-down version of "More than Friends" for Romanian radio stations Radio ZU and Kiss FM in March 2013. The singer also sang it on top of a building in Venice Beach as part of her "Rock the Roof" series, and on the Runyon Canyon in Los Angeles. Inna provided live performances of the recording at festival Alba Fest held in Alba Iulia, Romania, and at the World Trade Center Mexico City, On both occasions, she additionally sung a cover version of Justin Bieber's "Love Yourself" (2015), with her interpreting a stripped-down version of "Endless" (2011) at the Mexican venue.

== Track listing ==
Digital download
No.	Title	Length
1.	"More than Friends" (featuring Daddy Yankee)	4:00

Digital remixes EP
No.	Title	Length
1.	"More than Friends" (featuring Daddy Yankee)	3:57
2.	"More than Friends" (featuring Daddy Yankee) (Protoxic Club Mix)	6:22
3.	"More than Friends" (featuring Daddy Yankee) (Adi Perez Remix)	6:06
4.	"More than Friends" (featuring Daddy Yankee) (Adi Perez Remix Edit)	4:24
5.	"More than Friends" (featuring Daddy Yankee) (Futurism Remix)	6:46
6.	"More than Friends" (featuring Daddy Yankee) (Futurism Remix Edit)	3:50
7.	"More than Friends" (featuring Daddy Yankee) (Odd Remix)	5:46
8.	"More than Friends" (featuring Daddy Yankee) (Odd Remix Edit)	3:05
9.	"More than Friends" (featuring Daddy Yankee) (Odd Dubstep Remix)	4:33
10.	"More than Friends" (featuring Daddy Yankee) (Odd Dubstep Remix Edit)	3:16
11.	"More than Friends" (featuring Daddy Yankee) (extended version)	4:52

== Credits and personnel ==
Credits adapted from the liner notes of Party Never Ends.

- Inna – lead vocals
- Daddy Yankee – featured artist
- Justin Franks – composer
- DJ Frank E – producer
- Thomas Troelsen – composer
- Tierce Person – composer, producer

== Charts and certifications ==
=== Weekly charts ===
Chart (2013)	Peak position
Belgium (Ultratip Bubbling Under Wallonia)	8
Bulgaria (Media Forest)	7
Finland (Suomen virallinen latauslista)	24
France (SNEP)	92
Italy (FIMI)	52
Netherlands (Dance Top 30)	23
Poland Dance (ZPAV)	1
Poland (Video Chart)	2
Romania (Airplay 100)	20
Slovakia Airplay (ČNS IFPI)	5
Spain (Promusicae)	7

=== Year-end charts ===
Chart (2013)	Peak position
Spain (PROMUSICAE)	32

=== Certifications ===
Certifications for "More than Friends"
Region	Certification	Certified units/sales
Spain (Promusicae)	Gold	20,000^{*}
^{*} Sales figures based on certification alone.

== Release history ==
"More than Friends" was digitally released on 23 January 2013 by Roton. The same label also made the track available to German and Italian outlets on 28 January and 31 January 2013, respectively. An additional remixes EP was also released on 2 July 2013 in the United States, featuring ten remixes along with the original track.

Region	Date	Format	Label
Romania	23 January 2013	Digital download	Roton
Germany	28 January 2013	Digital download	Roton
Italy	31 January 2013	Digital download	Roton
United States	2 July 2013	Digital remixes EP	Roton

== See also ==
- List of music released by Romanian artists that has charted in major music markets
