= Good Time (Inna song) =

Single by Inna featuring Pitbull

from the album Party Never Ends, Body and the Sun and Inna
- Released: 15 July 2014
- Genre: Dance-pop
- Length: 3:23
- Label: Atlantic
- Songwriters: Steve Mac; Ina Wroldsen; Armando C. Perez
- Producer: Steve Mac

Inna singles chronology
"Cola Song" (2014)	"Good Time" (2014)	"Diggy Down" (2014)

Pitbull singles chronology
"Drink to That All Night" (2014)	"Good Time" (2014)	"Fireball" (2014)

"Good Time" is a song recorded by Romanian recording artist Inna for Body and the Sun (2015)—the Japanese counterpart of her fourth studio album, Inna (2015)—Inna, and Party Never Ends (2013). Featuring the vocals of Cuban-American rapper Pitbull, it was made available for digital download on 15 July 2014 through Atlantic Records. "Good Time"—an uptempo dance-pop track featuring "hedonistic and cheerful" lyrics—was written by Steve Mac, Pitbull and Ina Wroldsen, while being solely produced by Mac.

Music critics met "Good Time" with mixed reviews, with some of them calling it "addictive" and a "future hit", but also criticizing it for being a "filler track" on its parent album. An accompanying music video for the recording was uploaded on 28 July 2014 onto Inna's YouTube channel, and was shot by Barna Nemethi in Los Angeles, Miami and Bucharest. The visual portrays the singer performing to the song with fellow backup dancers according to what cameras order them to do by displaying words or phrases.

Commercially, "Good Time" didn't experience much success on record charts, with it only reaching the top seventy of the charts in native Romania and Belgium. In order to promote the track, Inna performed it during several of her concert tours that served to accompany Inna and Body and the Sun, but also at the World Trade Center Mexico. "Good Time" was further used for American sitcom Young & Hungry, and for American film Pitch Perfect 2 (2015).

== Background and release ==
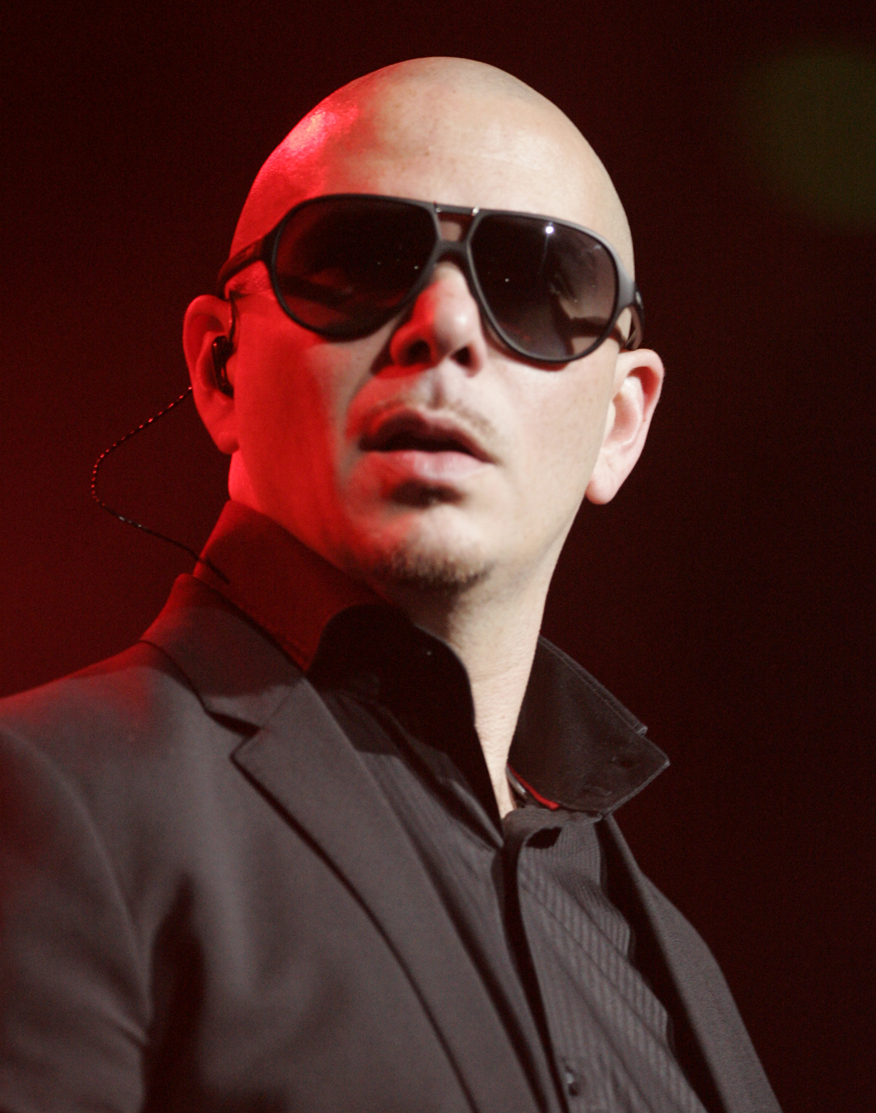
American rapper Pitbull (pictured) was featured on "Good Time". The two have previously collaborated on "All the Things", a track included on the latter's EP Meltdown (2013).

"Good Time" marks the second time Inna and Pitbull collaborated on a recording; the latter's 2013 extended play Meltdown included her vocals on a track called "All the Things". Prior to the release of "Good Time", Inna stated in an interview with Direct Lyrics on April 14, 2015, that "[the track is] really different from all the songs [she has] released so far. It has a good vibe, it's special, [she has] danced like crazy for 8-9 days with [her] choreographer to learn the routine for [her] lyric video." Following this, the recording was released on 15 July 2014 in multiple countries through Atlantic Records; on iTunes Store, it was made available time-limited for purchase for 69 cents (USD). "Good Time" was subsequently included on the American edition of her third studio album, Party Never Ends (2013), and was later featured on the Japanese counterpart of her fourth record Inna (2015), titled Body and the Sun (2015). The 2020 Complete Edition of Inna, released to SoundCloud, also included the song.

== Composition ==
"Good Time"
A 15-second sample of "Good Time", a dance-pop song with "hedonistic and cheerful" lyrics, featuring a portion of its chorus, which was eventually praised by music critics for being "addictive" and "bubbly".

"Good Time" was written by Steve Mac, Armando C. Perez and Ina Wroldsen, with Mac solely producing the track. The uptempo recording is of dance-pop genre, featuring the use of trumpets alongside "hedonistic and cheerful" simple lyrics. Pitbull introduces the track by rapping "An international sensation... Inna! Let's have a good time!", while Inna sings "Say he ho he ho he ho, come on everybody" by the pre-chorus. Direct Lyrics described "Good Time" as an "uplifting" song, saying that its sound was a "new territory" for Inna, and a departure from her previous house styles.

== Reception ==
Upon its release, "Good Time" received mixed reviews from music critics. Direct Lyrics praised the collaboration with Pitbull for the song, further labeling its chorus as "addictive" and "bubbly", and expecting it to become a "bona-fide summer hit". Romanian website Romania-Insider stated that they were not "impressed" by the track, likening it to Pitbull's previous solo works. German music website Hitfire criticized Pitbull's vocals on the recording, which they called a "filler track" for her album; they were positive towards its "earwormy" refrain. French publication Jukebox saw "Good Time" as a "future hit", while Japanese website iFlyer called its sound "dinstinctive" and "appropriate to decorate the summer of 2014". French music portal Musique Mag praised the song's "entertaining" lyrics: "Say he ho he ho he ho, come on everybody" interpreted by Inna.

Commercially, "Good Time" didn't experience much success on record charts. While the track reached number sixty-seven on the week ending 21 September 2014 on Romania's Airplay 100, it also managed to chart on the Belgian Dance Ultratop Flanders chart and the Ultratip Flanders chart at numbers forty-one and thirty, respectively.

== Music video ==
A shot from the music video, portraying Inna and fellow backup dancers laying over a Fiat car; the same model has been previously used for American singer Jennifer Lopez's visual of "Papi" (2011).

The accompanying music video for "Good Time"—directed in the span of two days by Barna Nemethi in Los Angeles, Miami and Bucharest in February 2014—premiered on 28 July 2014 on Inna's YouTube channel. Scenes with Pitbull were filmed separately in Miami, while Inna was on a promotional tour in Mexico City. Prior to this, a lyric video for the song was released on 2 July 2014 through the same means, recalling the concept of the official visual; it was filmed by Bogdan Daragiu and featured her performing choreography accompanied by two fellow background dancers.

The visual opens with a hand inserting a coin into a machine. Subsequently, a space full of cameras is shown, with one of them displaying Pitbull rapping in front of a blue backdrop. Next, Inna makes appearance performing a choreography accompanied by several background dancers; she wears a blonde wig and a white jumpsuit. Over the rest of the visual, the cameras display different words or phrases, to which Inna and the backup dancers are dressed to. The clip portrays them playing baseball, golf, paintball, acting as cheerleaders and being engaged with barbie dolls among other activities. A scene from the visual portrays the crowd leaning over a Fiat car; American singer Jennifer Lopez used the same model for the music video of her 2011 single, "Papi".

Direct Lyrics' Kevin Apaza was positive towards the clip, stating that it "isn't probably too high-budget, but it's good enough to put [him] in a good mood and have a good time watching it. Plus, the entire video screams 'summer'." Hitfire criticized the outfits worn by Inna throughout the clip, suggesting that "perhaps is the music video to show her fans how to not dress." The website went on into labeling it as "trashy", but described it as matching with the song.

== Live performances and usage in media ==
"Good Time" was set on the track list of several concert tours that promoted her album Inna and its Japanese counterpart Body and the Sun in Europe and Japan. The singer also provided a live performance of the recording at the World Trade Center Mexico, where she further interpreted a cover version of Justin Bieber's "Love Yourself" (2015), and a stripped-down version of her "Endless" (2011), and opened the Untold Festival in 2016. The song was used for American sitcom Young & Hungry, while also making appearance in American film Pitch Perfect 2.

== Credits and personnel ==
Credits adapted from the liner notes of Body and the Sun.

- Inna – lead vocals
- Pitbull – featured artist, composer
- Steve Mac – composer, producer
- Ina Wroldsen – composer

== Track listing ==
Digital download
No.	Title	Length
1.	"Good Time" (featuring Pitbull)	3:23

== Charts ==
=== Weekly charts ===
Chart	Peak position
Belgium Dance (Ultratop Flanders)	41
Belgium (Ultratip Bubbling Under Flanders)	30
Romania (Airplay 100)	67

=== Year-end charts ===
Chart (2014)	Peak position
Poland (Dance Top 50)	37

== Release history ==
Territory	Date	Format	Label
Denmark	15 July 2014	Digital single	Atlantic
Germany	15 July 2014	Digital single	Atlantic
Netherlands	15 July 2014	Digital single	Atlantic
Romania	15 July 2014	Digital single	Atlantic
Russia	15 July 2014	Digital single	Atlantic
Sweden	15 July 2014	Digital single	Atlantic
United States	15 July 2014	Digital single	Atlantic
Italy	30 July 2014	Radio airplay	Artist Partner Group
