= Diggy Down =

Single by Inna featuring Marian Hill or remix featuring the latter and Yandel

from the album Inna and Body and the Sun
- Released: 15 December 2014
- Genre: Dance-pop; R&B
- Length: 3:14
- Label: Empire; Roton
- Songwriters: Ilsey Juber; Marcel Botezan; Radu Bolfea; Sebastian Barac
- Producer: Vlad Lucan

Inna singles chronology
"Good Time" (2014)	"Diggy Down" (2014)	"We Wanna" (2015)

Marian Hill singles chronology
"Diggy Down" (2014)	"One Time" (2015)

Music video
- "Diggy Down" on YouTube

"Diggy Down" is a song recorded by Romanian recording artist Inna for her eponymous and fourth studio album (2015) and its Japanese counterpart Body and the Sun (2015). Released for digital download on 15 December 2014 through Empire Music and Roton, it samples Marian Hill's "Got It" (2014), for which the American duo received credit as a featured artist. A remix of the song further featuring American artist Yandel was eventually made available. Written by Ilsey Juber, Marcel Botezan, Radu Bolfea and Sebastian Barac, and produced solely by Vlad Lucan, "Diggy Down" is a mid-tempo dance-pop and R&B recording which lyrically portrays Inna being 'diggy down' on her boyfriend's wishes.

An accompanying music video for the recording was uploaded on 9 December 2014 onto Inna's YouTube channel, and was shot by Michael Mircea in Bucharest, Romania. The visual portrays the singer and a backup dancer performing to the song in front of different backdrops; a special effect was used to duplicate some frames. With music critics generally acclaiming the song and its music video, the clip received a nomination at the 2016 Radio România Actualități Awards for "Best Video".

Commercially, the single reached number one on native Airplay 100, claiming the position for a total of six weeks. It additionally charted at number three in Bulgaria, and peaked at number two hundred twenty-four in Russia. At the 2015 Media Music Awards, a Romanian awards gala based on a song's radio and television coverage, it won "Best Dance". With that privilege, Media Forest revealed that, according to their measurements for the first half of 2015, "Diggy Down" and its music video were played the most on Romanian radio and television, respectively.

== Composition ==
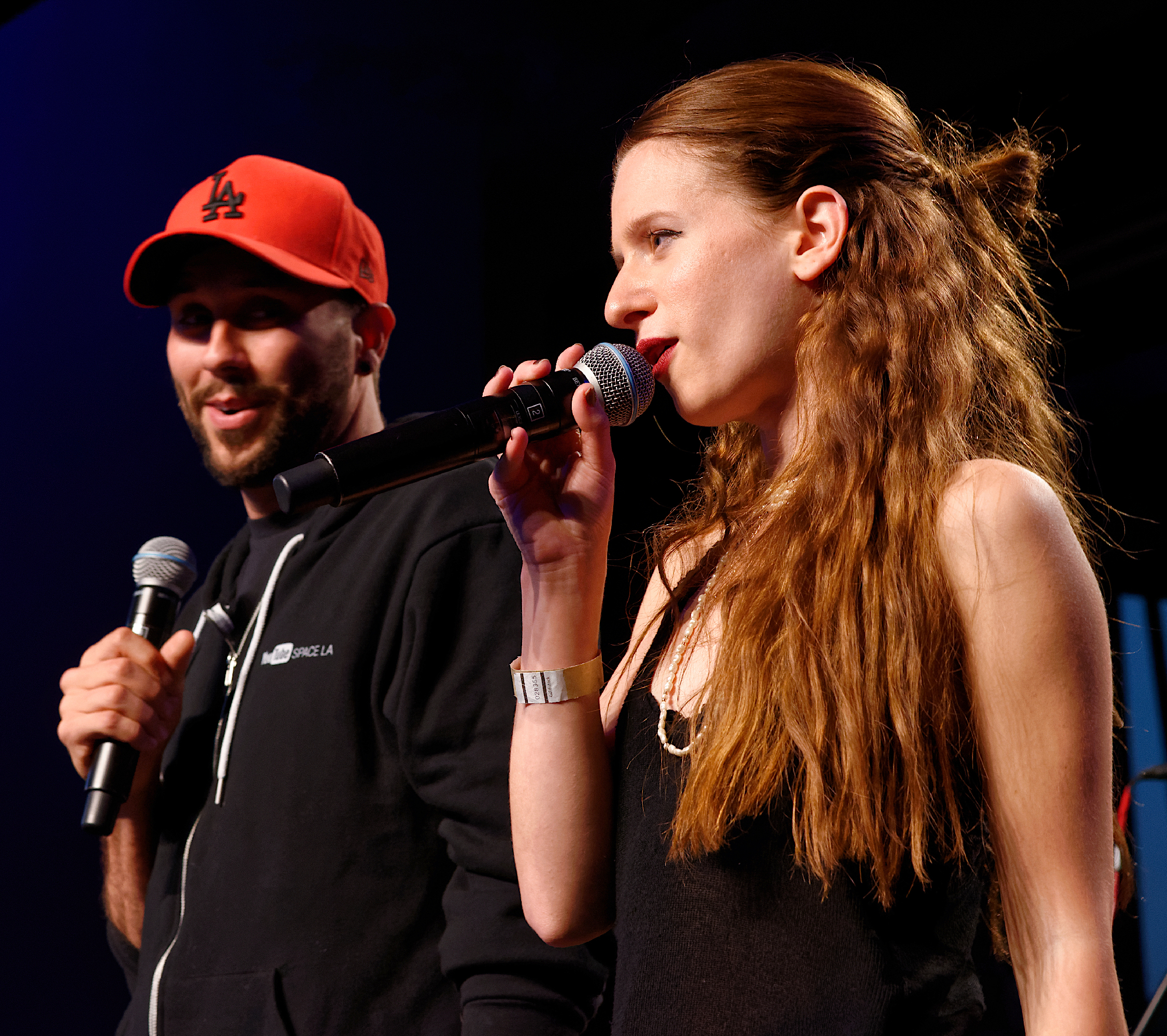
"Diggy Down" samples Marian Hill's (pictured) "Got It" (2014), for which the American duo received credit as a featured artist on the single.

"Diggy Down" was written by Ilsey Juber, Marcel Botezan, Radu Bolfea and Sebastian Barac, while being solely produced by Vlad Lucan. It samples elements from Marian Hill's recording "Got It" (2014), for which the band is credited as a featured artist. The single is a mid-tempo dance-pop recording incorporating R&B influences into its sound. According to music website Direct Lyrics's Kevin Apaza, the track lyrically portrays Inna "[loving] the way her boy moves and [telling] him she is 'diggy diggy down' to do whatever he wants". Apaza went on noting similarities between the track's saxophone sequences and Jason Derulo's work.

== Reception and accolades ==
"Diggy Down" received favorable reviews from music critics. Kevin Apaza, writing for Direct Lyrics, named the song "definitely Top 40 radio material" and "American industry-friendly". Furthermore, he labelled it as a "sexy saxophone-tinged track", being disappointed about Atlantic Records not promoting the single in the United States. German portal Hitfire praised "Diggy Down", and called the saxophone parts of the recording a highlight, while pointing out the whole result as being different from Inna's past material.

"Diggy Down" reached number one on native Airplay 100 on 1 March 2015, claiming the position for a total of six weeks. In Bulgaria, the recording similarly experienced commercial success, reaching number three on the Singles Top 40 in its eleventh week; it was a top-ten for eleven consecutive weeks. While being present in the Bulgarian chart for a total of twenty-two editions, "Diggy Down" peaked as well at number two hundred twenty-four in the Commonwealth of Independent States.

The track was awarded with "Best Dance" at the Media Music Awards 2015, a Romanian music awards ceremony primarily based on a song's radio and television coverage. With this occasion, it was revealed that—according to Media Forest's measurements in the first half of 2015—"Diggy Down" was the most-played song on Romanian radio. Its music video led as well the chart with visuals played the most on Romanian television; they received 4,216 and 5,520 total spins, respectively.

== Music video ==
A scene from the music video portraying Inna dressing a white habit. The visual included a special effect to duplicate some frames. (pictured)

The release of "Diggy Down" and its accompanying music video was previewed on 20 November 2014 through a teaser uploaded by Inna on her YouTube channel. Subsequently, the visual was released on 9 December 2014 through the same platform. It was filmed by Michael Mircea in Bucharest, with frequent collaborator John Perez acting as the director of photography.

The visual opens with two waterdrops dropping in slow motion into bubbling water; a cosmetic product floats in it. Subsequently, Inna is shown wearing a white habit and performing hand movements accompanied by a male background dancer sporting black boxer shorts. Following this, the singer kneels down on the floor while being surrounded by smoke, with the next scene of the clip presenting her wearing a metallic outfit and a bob cut in front of a flames-designed backdrop shown in the opening. The rest of the music video sees Inna and her backup performer further dancing to the song, with scenes interspersed through the main clip portraying the singer being engaged with a snake. A special effect was used to duplicate some frames of the visual.

Kevin Apaza of Direct Lyrics compared Inna's "mysterious" appearance throughout the video to Cleopatra. Hitfire was positive towards the clip, eventually comparing it to the Pussycat Dolls' 2006 single "Buttons". Romanian publication Libertatea stated that the visual emphasised the singer's both vocal and physical abilities, resulting a "maximum effect". Online magazine Star Gossip labelled the music video as "exotic and a bit erotic", and an "exercise of imagination", with them noticing the absence of a plot. The clip was nominated for "Best Video" at the 2015 Radio România Actualități Awards alongside Alina Eremia's "A fost o nebunie" and Shift featuring Andra's "Avioane de hârtie", eventually losing to the latter music video.

== Live performances ==
"Diggy Down" was set on the track list of all concert tours that promoted her album Inna and its Japanese counterpart Body and the Sun in Europe and Japan. The singer also provided live performances of the recording at festival Alba Fest held in Alba Iulia, Romania, and at the World Trade Center Mexico, On both occasions, she additionally sung a cover version of Justin Bieber's "Love Yourself" (2015), with her interpreting a stripped-down version of "Endless" (2011) at the Mexican venue. The singer also performed "Diggy Down" live at an event hosted by Los 40 Principales, where acts like One Direction, The Vamps, David Bisbal, Birdy, Cris Cab and Wisin were also present, and opened the Untold Festival in 2016.

== Track listing ==
Official versions (Note: This acts as a summary of all versions of the single found on Body and the Sun and its digital releases in Romania and the United States.)

1. "Diggy Down" (radio edit version; feat. Marian Hill) – 3:14
2. "Diggy Down" (extended version; feat. Marian Hill) – 4:42
3. "Diggy Down" (Embody remix; feat. Marian Hill) – 3:38
4. "Diggy Down" (piano version) – 2:48

== Charts ==
=== Weekly charts ===
Weekly chart performance for "Diggy Down"
Chart (2015)	Peak position
Bulgaria (Singles Top 40)	3
Moldova (Media Forest)	2
Romania (Airplay 100)	1
Romania (Romanian Radio Airplay)	1
Romania (Romania TV Airplay)	1

=== Year-end charts ===
Year-end chart performance for "Diggy Down"
Chart (2015)	Position
Romania (Airplay 100)	3

== Release ==
=== Process ===
"Diggy Down" was simultaneously released to European digital outlets through Empire Music and Roton on 15 December 2014. On 24 July 2015, the song was made available for purchase in the United States by the same means. While the European release featured an extended version of the single, the American edition incorporated the Embody remix of the single. Additionally, a remix version of "Diggy Down" featuring the vocals of American reggaeton artist Yandel was posted on Inna's YouTube channel on 11 May 2015, with scenes of him filmed in Paris being added to the single's music video.

=== History ===
Release history for "Diggy Down"
Territory	Date	Format	Label
Denmark	15 December 2014	Digital single	Empire/ Roton
Germany	15 December 2014	Digital single	Empire/ Roton
Netherlands	15 December 2014	Digital single	Empire/ Roton
Romania	15 December 2014	Digital single	Empire/ Roton
Russia	15 December 2014	Digital single	Empire/ Roton
Sweden	15 December 2014	Digital single	Empire/ Roton
United States	24 July 2015	Digital single	Empire/ Roton

== See also ==
- List of Airplay 100 number ones of the 2010s
