= Edward Aninaru =

Romanian photographer

- Born: Edward Aninaru; January 4, 1976 (age 50); Bucharest, Romania
- Occupations: commercial and portrait photographer, music video director
- Years active: 2007-present
- Website: www.edwardaninaru.com

Edward Aninaru (born January 4, 1976) is a Romanian fashion, celebrity photographer and music video director, currently living and working in Los Angeles, California.

== Early life ==
Edward Aninaru was born and raised in Bucharest, the capital of Romania, where he graduated a school of music and one of accountancy and attended two colleges. He discovered photography in 2007. He didn't attend any photography course or school, it all happened accidentally. He uploaded pictures to different forums and the feedback of the people motivated him to pursue the photography as a profession.

== Career ==
Aninaru started his career in Bucharest, Romania, working for INNA, with whom he shot over 50 photo sessions, some of them being featured in magazines. He has photographed for covers of Vogue, Harper’s Bazaar, Glamour, ELLE, Cosmopolitan, Playboy, Forbes, FHM, SHAPE and CKM . and shot campaigns for Anastasia Beverly Hills, Pepsi Romania and Romanian record labels Roton, Cat Music and MediaPro Music.

In 2012, Aninaru moved to Los Angeles and worked with Celine Dion, Ne-Yo, Jay Sean, Shontelle, The Janoskians, Michael Franti, Akcent, Alexandra Stan, James Goldstein, Falling in Reverse, Catrinel Menghia and Madalina Ghenea. Madalina Ghenea, the Romanian fashion model, said of Aninaru on her Facebook page - "I work with one of the greatest photographers in the world!". He also shot for Capitol Records and Sony Music.

== Music videos ==
Aninaru has also directed music videos, both in Romania and the United States, his first one being filmed in 2012, for INNA's single "WoW". He also directed videos for INNA's "INNdiA", "Crazy Sexy Wild (Tu si Eu)" and "More Than Friends". In 2012 Aninaru directed Romanian artist Antonia's video for her single "Jameia".
