= Roton Music =

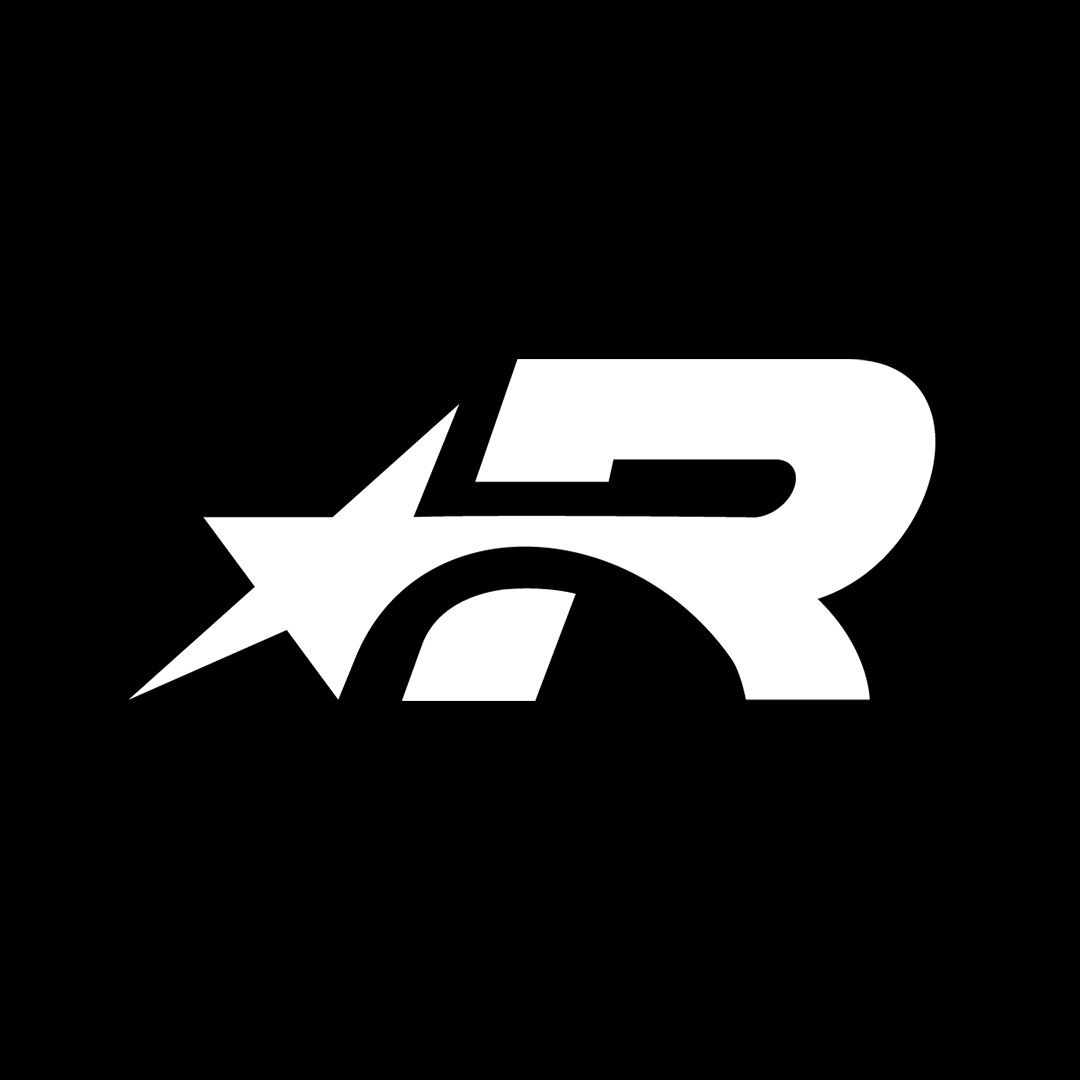
- Founded: 1994
- Genre: Dance; Pop; Rock; Trap; CDs
- Country of origin: Romania
- Location: Bucharest
- Official website: roton.ro

Roton Music is an independent Romanian record label established in 1994. The company had hundreds of employees, having offices in Bucharest, Iași, Cluj and Timișoara.

In 2011, Roton Music entered into a licensing deal with Warner Music Group for some of its most popular artists and their catalogue. In October 2015, Warner Music Group and Roton extended their distribution deal to include Latin America.

The Roton Music record label is composed of four sub-labels:

- Roton Music
- INAMEIT (Dance music)
- Clopoțelul Magic / Magic Bell (Children's music)
- Tezaur (Authentic Romanian folklore)

Roton Music's partners:

- HaHaHa Production (Various)
- Uninvited Artists (Indie pop)
- Seek Music (Trap music)

== Major artists ==
- Akcent
- Fly Project
- Manuel Riva
- Misha Miller
- Otilia
- Serena
- Sasha Lopez

== Former artists ==
- Alexandra Stan
- Amna
- Anda Adam
- Andeeno Damassy
- Antonia Iacobescu
- Andreea Bălan
- Criss Blaziny
- Connect-R
- Corina
- Dan Bălan
- Emil Lassaria
- Inna
- Mihail
- Radio Killer
- Simplu
- Smiley

== Other artists ==
- Ahmed Chawki
- Basshunter
- Sak Noel
- Pitbull
- Willy William
