= De Unde Vii la Ora Asta? =

2017 single by Smiley

Single by Smiley

from the album Confesiune
- Language: Romanian
- Released: April 10, 2017
- Recorded: 2017
- Genre: Dance-pop
- Length: 3:36
- Label: HaHaHa Production; Cat Music

Smiley singles chronology
"Îndrăgostit (Deși n-am Vrut)" (2016)	"De Unde Vii la Ora Asta?" (2017)	"Ce Mă Fac Cu Tine de Azi?" (2017)

Music video
- "De Unde Vii la Ora Asta?" on YouTube

"De Unde Vii la Ora Asta?" (Romanian pronunciation: [de ˈunde ˈvij la ˈora ˈasta]; "Where are you coming from at this hour?") is a single by Romanian singer Smiley from the album Confesiune released on April 10, 2017. The song peaked at number one in the Romania Top 20 charts, spending twenty-one weeks there, and four weeks in the most-broadcast songs on Romanian radio stations in the 2010s (and Top 100), topping them with number one on one occasion. The song also peaked List of Airplay 100 number ones at number one on one occasion, spending a total of five weeks in the respective top.

The song won the 2017 Romanian Music Awards category of "Fastest Number One" song.

== Music video ==
The music video of the song was released alongside the song itself on April 10, 2017, and was directed and produced by Smiley alongside HaHaHa Production staff.

The video was shot at the historical landmark of Manasia Estate in Urziceni. The video starts by showing main artist Smiley inside a mansion cellar. He takes a glass of wine waiting for his loved one in the dining room, visibly becoming frustrated over her being late and still away from home. Smiley then rushes to the main door and opens it, just to find himself and the mansion itself on a rooftop of an apartment block from Bucharest. Melancholic, Smiley walks the rooftop as he sings the lyrics of the song, still waiting for his loved one who seemingly had an affair as he was imagining. Smiley enters the mansion and waits a little more, then opens the main door again, this time finding himself in the middle of Bucharest Old Town. As the lyrics hint the appearance of his missing loved one as being "with a messy coat and hairstyle", he finds a random woman on the street matching the exact description, however mistaking her for his lover. The video then shows his true loved one exiting the mansion's cellar with a glass of wine in her hand, while Smiley is still strolling the streets of the Old Town. While the girl was waiting for him inside the mansion, Smiley apparently walked all the way from the Old Town to the real location of the Mansion in Urziceni. The reality shows that, in fact, as a turn of events, the girl was the one who thought Smiley was away having an affair, portraiting the exact state he was imagining at first. The video ends with him falling into disbelief as the situation concluded him as the true missing link of the story.

=== Song concept ===
The song was created to portray jealousy as one of the darkest sides of love as the video shows what overthinking can lead one person to do.

== Reception ==
The song was the second from a series of ten tracks released on the course of ten months to celebrate ten years of Smiley's career as a solo artist. Just 24 hours after its release, the song recorded remarkable performances as it had established a suite of records such as collecting over 1 million views on YouTube, placing itself on the first place on iTunes and reaching the top 10 radio Romanian broadcasts.

== Charts ==
Chart (2017)	Peak position
Romanian top 20	1
Romania Airplay 100	1

== Personnel ==
- Smiley – vocals, production, arrangements
  - Music – Smiley, Florin Boka, Marius Pop, Vladimir Coman-Popescu, Șerban Cazan
  - Text – Smiley, Alexandru Stancu
  - Video – HaHaHa Video Production (Iura Luncasu, Liviu Marghidan)

== Release history ==
- 2017 Romania: CD (as part of Confesiune) Cat Music 101 2838 2
- 2017 Romania: CD (as part of Confesiune) HaHaHa Production 101 2838 2
