= Vals (song) =

2017 single by Smiley

Single by Smiley

from the album Confesiune
- Language: Romanian
- Released: November 10, 2017
- Recorded: 2017
- Genre: Dance-pop; waltz
- Length: 3:44
- Label: HaHaHa Production; Cat Music

Smiley singles chronology
"Ce Mă Fac Cu Tine de Azi?" (2017)	"Vals" (2017)	"Aprinde Scânteia" (2018)

Music video
- "Vals" on YouTube

"Vals" (Romanian pronunciation: [vals]; "Waltz") is a single by Romanian singer Smiley from the album Confesiune released on November 10, 2017. The song peaked at number one in the Romania Top 20 charts, spending eight weeks there, and ten weeks in the most-broadcast songs on Romanian radio stations in the 2010s (and Top 100), topping them with number one on one occasion. The song also peaked List of Airplay 100 number ones at number one on one occasion, spending a total of four weeks in the respective top.

== Music video ==
The music video of the song was released alongside the song itself on November 10, 2017, and was directed and produced by Smiley alongside HaHaHa Production staff.

The video was shot at The Merlock Restaurant on C.A. Rosetti Street in Bucharest. It starts by showing main artist Smiley entering the venue where he stumbles upon frozen people who were dancing before a sudden pause in time. He meets a woman playing the piano, the only person still able to move who invites him to dance. As the pair continued their dance, the rest of the frozen people suddenly began to move again. As the song's chorus lyrics hint, "dancing only with her, the people around were an orchestra accompanying us", the pair spread energy intense enough to bring the crowd of dancers back to life. The girl suddenly ran away, leaving Smiley confused and the rest of the dancers frozen again. The latter chases after her downstairs unsuccessful. He then finds a dusty phonograph and plays it, just to find the dancers moving again. The runaway girl appears out of nowhere and starts dancing with Smiley again, on the same waltz rhythm of the very song until the end of the video.

=== Song concept ===
In an interview from January 2019, Smiley explained that the song represents a metaphor of a couple's relationship, a depiction about how two people "adjust" each other when they're together. Sometimes they do synchronize better, sometimes harder, but regardless of everything, they continue their dance through life together, Smiley stated.

=== Reception ===
"Waltz" is the penultimate single from the series of 10 musical confessions that the artist gave fans as part of the "#Smiley10" anniversary project built into the album of Confesiune. Iecame the most played track on many Romanian Radio broadcast stations according to Media Forest and, as of August 2024, has collected more than 49 million views on YouTube. It was declared the most broadcast song in the last trimester of 2018 according to Romanian Audience Association (ARA).

== Vals feat. Feli (2018) ==
"Vals"

Single by Smiley featuring Feli

from the album Confesiune
- Language: Romanian
- Released: January 18, 2018
- Recorded: 2017–2018
- Length: 3:38
- Label: HaHaHa Production; Cat Music

Music video
- "Vals feat. Feli" on YouTube

On January 18, 2018, "Vals" was re-released as a single featuring Feli. The song retains its original arrangement, except several parts of the chorus and secondary lyrics sung by Feli.

=== Music video ===
A new music video was filmed as well. It only features main artists Smiley and Feli represented in doodle-style graphic facing each other and singing the lyrics of the song by standing still. Secondary artist Feli stated that the main reason why she wished to be part of the duet was to also create a sung version coming from a woman's perspective of view which brings up more sensitivity to the song.

== Charts ==
Chart (2017)	Peak position
Romanian top 20	1
Romania Airplay 100	1

== Personnel ==
- Smiley, Feli – vocals, production, arrangements
  - Music – Smiley, Florin Boka, Șerban Cazan
  - Text – Smiley, Dorian Micu
  - Video – HaHaHa Video Production (Iura Luncasu)

== Release history ==
- 2017 Romania: CD (as part of Confesiune) Cat Music 101 2838 2
- 2017 Romania: CD (as part of Confesiune) HaHaHa Production 101 2838 2
