= Îndrăgostit (Deși n-am Vrut) =

2016 single by Smiley

Single by Smiley

from the album Confesiune
- Language: Romanian
- Released: October 6, 2016
- Recorded: 2016
- Genre: Dance-pop; soul
- Length: 3:49
- Label: HaHaHa Production; Cat Music

Smiley singles chronology
"Insomnii" (2016)	"Îndrăgostit (Deși n-am Vrut)" (2016)	"De Unde Vii la Ora Asta?" (2017)

Music video
- "Îndrăgostit (Deși n-am Vrut)" on YouTube

"Îndrăgostit (Deși n-am Vrut)" (Romanian pronunciation: [ɨndrəɡosˈtit deˈʃi nam ˈvrut]; "In love (against my will)") is a single by Romanian singer Smiley from the album Confesiune released on October 6, 2016. The song peaked at number five in the Romania Top 20 charts, spending thirteen weeks there.

The song won the 2016 Romanian Music Awards category for the Best Male Artist.

== Music video ==
The music video of the song was released alongside the song itself on October 6, 2016, and was directed and produced by Smiley alongside HaHaHa Production staff.

The video starts with an aerial shot of the University Square, Bucharest. The action switches to a suit shop from the vicinity where Smiley starts singing the very song of the video, imitating a mannequin head standing on a table together with a beautiful girl who was standing in the same position. The shopkeeper sees a taxi flashingly stopping in front of the store. The video then shows the "rest of the bodies" neck down belonging to Smiley and the girl riding inside the taxi, represented by headless mannequins. Back to the fashion shop, Smiley and the girl act like real humans, but the shopkeepers and the people on the street still treat them like objects. One careless female shopkeeper even tries to cut Smiley's long hair while talking on the phone, with the latter visibly concerned about the situation.

The video then switches to Lake Herăstrău where the "rest of the bodies" belonging to Smiley and the girl continue spending quality time together by sharing a paddle boat trip, walking on the "Lovers Street" (placed in Bucharest's Sector One) and even visiting a Chinese restaurant where they seem to somehow be able to get along with the Chinese server despite being "headless". They receive a couple of fortune cookies, with one of them saying "Dacă ești îndrăgostit, fă ce te taie capul.", which represents a Romanian saying translating "If you are in love, do what your head tells you to". The video then shows the "headless" couple attending a fair, eating ice cream and taking selfies. The video ends when the mannequins find the real heads of Smiley and the girl by walking exactly past the respective suit store.

=== Song concept ===
When asked about the song's backstory, Smiley stated that it is widely believed that when you fall in love, you lose your head. Whether chemistry or destiny is to blame, it matters less. The important thing is to live that moment and allow ourselves, without any fear or restraint, to feel. Smiley concluded by saying that the song intentionally shares an apparently unusual story, an inspired mixture of madness, courage and emotion.

== Charts ==
Chart (2016)	Peak position
Romanian top 20	5

== Personnel ==
- Smiley – vocals, production, arrangements
  - Music – Smiley, Marius Pop, Alex Racovita, Vlad Popescu, Serban Cazan
  - Text – Smiley, Dorian Micu, Vlad Munteanu
  - Video – HaHaHa Video Production (Ionut Trandafir)

== Release history ==
- 2017 Romania: CD (as part of Confesiune) Cat Music 101 2838 2
- 2017 Romania: CD (as part of Confesiune) HaHaHa Production 101 2838 2
