= Insomnii =

2016 single by Smiley

Single by Smiley

from the album Confesiune
- Language: Romanian
- Released: April 15, 2016
- Recorded: 2016
- Genre: Dance-pop; waltz
- Length: 3:35
- Label: HaHaHa Production; Cat Music

Smiley singles chronology
"Oarecare" (2015)	"Insomnii" (2016)	"Îndrăgostit (Deși n-am Vrut)" (2016)

Music video
- "Insomnii" on YouTube

"Insomnii" (Romanian pronunciation: [inˈsomnij]; "Insomnia") is a single by Romanian singer Smiley from the album Confesiune released on April 15, 2016. The song peaked at number six in the Romania Top 20 charts, spending ten weeks there.

== Music video ==
The music video of the song was released alongside the song itself on April 15, 2016, and was directed and produced by Smiley alongside HaHaHa Production staff.

The video starts by showing main artist Smiley in his presumed bedroom, a weird space with a black and white checkered tiled floor and rotated windows. The time is presumably somewhere around midnight as Smiley gets out of a narrow one-person bed due to insomnia, as the very name of the song hints. He looks out the window and sees the moon represented by a woman similar to what A Trip to the Moon movie does. The moon is paired by three angel-looking flying women. He then sees the shadows of the trees represented by women with messy hairstyles reflected onto the walls of the room, and even tries to exit the room through the window and crawl down the walls of the house. The video then shows Smiley sleeplessly strolling the room, saying he is desperately trying to get some sleep but he can't do it without his love one near him to say good night. Finally, a woman (presumably his loved one) arrives in the room as the video ends with both her and Smiley finally falling asleep together in the bed.

=== Song concept ===
The song represents various visual depictions of insomnia, affection from which Smiley himself said he often suffers from, thus the main reason of him composing the piece.

== Charts ==
Chart (2016)	Peak position
Romanian top 20	6

== Personnel ==
- Smiley – vocals, production, arrangements
  - Music – Smiley, Serban Cazan
  - Text – Smiley
  - Video – HaHaHa Video Production (Adrian Batista)

== Release history ==
- 2017 Romania: CD (as part of Confesiune) Cat Music 101 2838 2
- 2017 Romania: CD (as part of Confesiune) HaHaHa Production 101 2838 2
