= Confesiune =

Studio album by Smiley
- Released: 10 December 2017
- Recorded: 2017
- Genre: Dance-pop; Europop; rap
- Length: 44:02
- Label: Cat Music; HaHaHa Production
- Producer: Smiley

Smiley chronology
Acasă (2013)	Confesiune (2017)	Mai Mult De-O Viață (2022)

Singles from Confesiune
- 1. "Insomnii" Released: 15 April 2016; 2. "Îndrăgostit (Deși n-am vrut)" Released: 6 October 2016; 3. "De unde vii la ora asta?" Released: 10 April 2017; 4. "Ce mă fac cu tine de azi?" Released: 10 September 2017; 5. "Vals" Released: 10 November 2017

Confesiune (Romanian pronunciation: [konfesiˈune]; Confession) is the fourth studio album by Romanian singer Smiley, released on December 10, 2017, by Cat Music and HaHaHa Production. The album peaked at number one in the Romania Top 100 charts with the single "Ce mă fac cu tine de azi?", spending four weeks in both top 10 and lower places of the Romanian charts.

The album has won the 2018 Radio România Actualităţi Awards category of the Best Album. It also featured Juno and Guess Who as collaborators. The total of 13 tracks from the album are preponderently interpreted in Romanian, with a couple of exceptions where the songs are also interpreted in English.

== Album story ==
=== The #Smiley10 Project ===
The album on "Confesiune" features the #Smiley10 project, a marathon of tenmusical confessions which celebrated ten years since the release of Smiley's first singles hit, "În lipsa mea" which headlined the namesake album. It debuted on March 10, 2017, with the manifesto piece "Flori De Plastic", whose video, in the form of a short animation film, is the first of its kind released by Smiley.

This was followed by the single "De Unde Vii la Ora Asta?", which achieved one million views on YouTube on the first day after its release, and almost 50 million to date. "Mr. Smiley", a funk song in which Smiley sings the refrain of his life, "Să-mi Fie Vară", "Rara" and "O Altă Ea", "Ce Mă Fac Cu Tine De Azi?", featuring Guess Who, Pierdut Printre Femei, "Waltz" and "O poveste" completed the list of songs released in the ten months of the #Smiley10 project, a multimedia musical confession, a marathon of releases and innovations that stretched over the course of a year and culminated in an album release, the fourth of the artist's solo career, "Confesiune".

== Track listing ==
No.	Title	Writer(s)	Music	Length
1.	"De Unde Vii la Ora Asta? (Where are you coming from at this hour?)"	Smiley; Alexandru Stancu	Smiley; Florin Boka; Marius Pop; Vladimir Coman-Popescu; Șerban Cazan	3:36
2.	"Flori de Plastic (Plastic flowers)"	Smiley; Alexandru Stancu; Dorian Micu; Vlad Munteanu	Smiley; Dorian Micu; Marcel Moldovan; Marius Pop; Șerban Cazan	3:27
3.	"Îndrăgostit (Deși N-am Vrut) (In love (against my will))"	Smiley; Dorian Micu; Vlad Munteanu	Smiley; Alex Racoviță; Marius Pop; Vlad Popescu; Șerban Cazan	3:49
4.	"Domnu' Smiley (Mister Smiley)"	Smiley; Dorian Micu; Vlad Munteanu	Smiley; Dorian Micu; Vlad Munteanu; Vladimir Coman-Popescu; Șerban Cazan	3:57
5.	"Rara (feat. Juno)"	Smiley; Alexandru Stanciu; Dorian Micu	Smiley; Mihai Andrei; Dorian Micu; Marius Pop	3:21
6.	"O Altă Ea (Another her)"	Smiley; Cristian Pascu; Felicia Donose	Smiley; Felicia Donose; Florin Boka; Vlad Popescu; Șerban Cazan	3:25
7.	"Insomnii (Insomnia)"	Smiley	Smiley; Șerban Cazan	3:35
8.	"Să-mi Fie Vară (Let it be summer)"	Smiley; Dorian Micu	Smiley; Andrei Mihai; Dorian Micu; Marius Pop	3:18
9.	"Ce Mă Fac Cu Tine De Azi? (What am I supposed to do with you from now on?) (feat. Guess Who)"	Smiley; Guess Who	Smiley; Florin Boka; Lucian Nagy; Marius Pop; Sergiu Ferat; Șerban Cazan	3:36
10.	"Pierdut Printre Femei (Lost between women)"	Smiley; Alexandru Stancu; Dorian Micu; Jean Gavril	Smiley; Dorian Micu; Florin Boka; Jean Gavril; Lucian Nagy; Marius Pop; Vlad Popescu; Șerban Cazan	3:42
11.	"Vals (Waltz)"	Smiley; Dorian Micu	Smiley; Florin Boka; Șerban Cazan	3:44
12.	"O Poveste (A story)"	Smiley; Dorian Micu; Elena Moroșanu	Smiley; Andrei Mihai; Dorian Micu; Elena Moroșanu	3:37
13.	"Confesiune (Confession)"	Smiley	Smiley; Șerban Cazan	3:35
Total length:				44:02

== Release history ==
- 2017 Romania: CD Cat Music 101 2838 2
- 2017 Romania: CD HaHaHa Production 101 2838 2
