= List of Airplay 100 number ones =

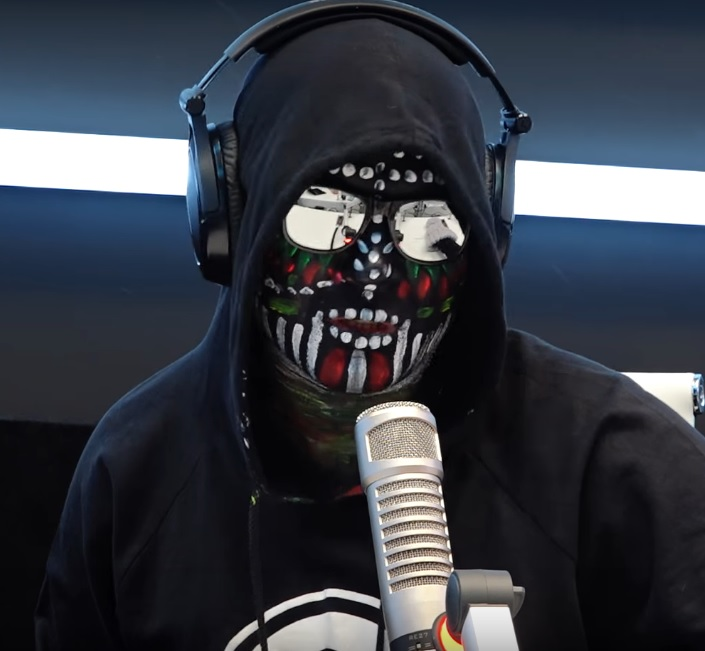
Moldovan group Carla's Dreams (member pictured in 2018) was the most-successful act on the Airplay 100 in the 2010s with nine number-one singles.

The Airplay 100 was the national music chart of Romania until its cancellation upon its 28 November 2021 issue. It was compiled weekly by broadcast monitoring service Media Forest, and measured the airplay of songs on radio stations and television channels throughout the country. Since its launch on 26 February 2012, the Airplay 100 had been broadcast on-air each Sunday as a radio show on Kiss FM hosted by Cristi Nitzu. The chart replaced the Romanian Top 100, which was also based on airplay data and had a similar compilation, in 2012.

During the 2010s and early 2020s, 118 singles have reached the number-one position, the first being "Ai Se Eu Te Pego" in 2012 by Brazilian singer Michel Teló. "Astronaut in the Ocean" (2019) by Australian rapper Masked Wolf has spent 13 weeks at the summit, longer than any other song. Multiple artists reached number one with several singles in a calendar year, most notably Moldovan musical project Carla's Dreams with four in 2016—"Te rog", "Sub pielea mea", "Acele" and "Imperfect". The most successful act was Carla's Dreams with nine number ones, followed by Romanian recording artist Smiley with four.

Cat Music have had a large impact on Romanian broadcasting starting with the chart's establishment year, having signed artists such as Smiley, 3 Sud Est, Elena Gheorghe and Voltaj. Every year, the label has released songs that have gone on to be featured on the list of the most broadcast ones in Romania. Global Records are also notable, having signed Inna, Delia and Carla's Dreams. The chart's last number one was "Rita" by Romanian singers Connect-R and Smiley.

== Number ones ==
Key
†	Indicates number-one song of the year (Note: In 2012, "I Follow Rivers" by Lykke Li was listed as 2012's most-played song, but it did not reach number one on the Airplay 100.)

=== 2010s ===
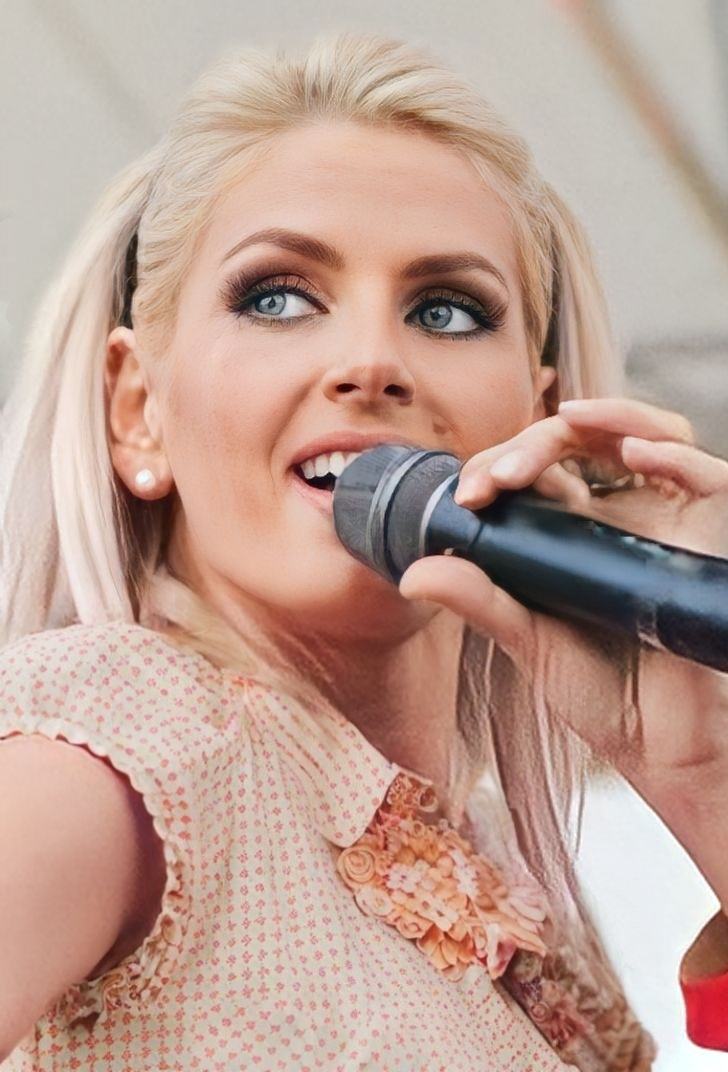
Andreea Bănică (pictured) and Laurențiu Duță reached the top of the charts with "Shining Heart" for 7 weeks, the record of 2012.

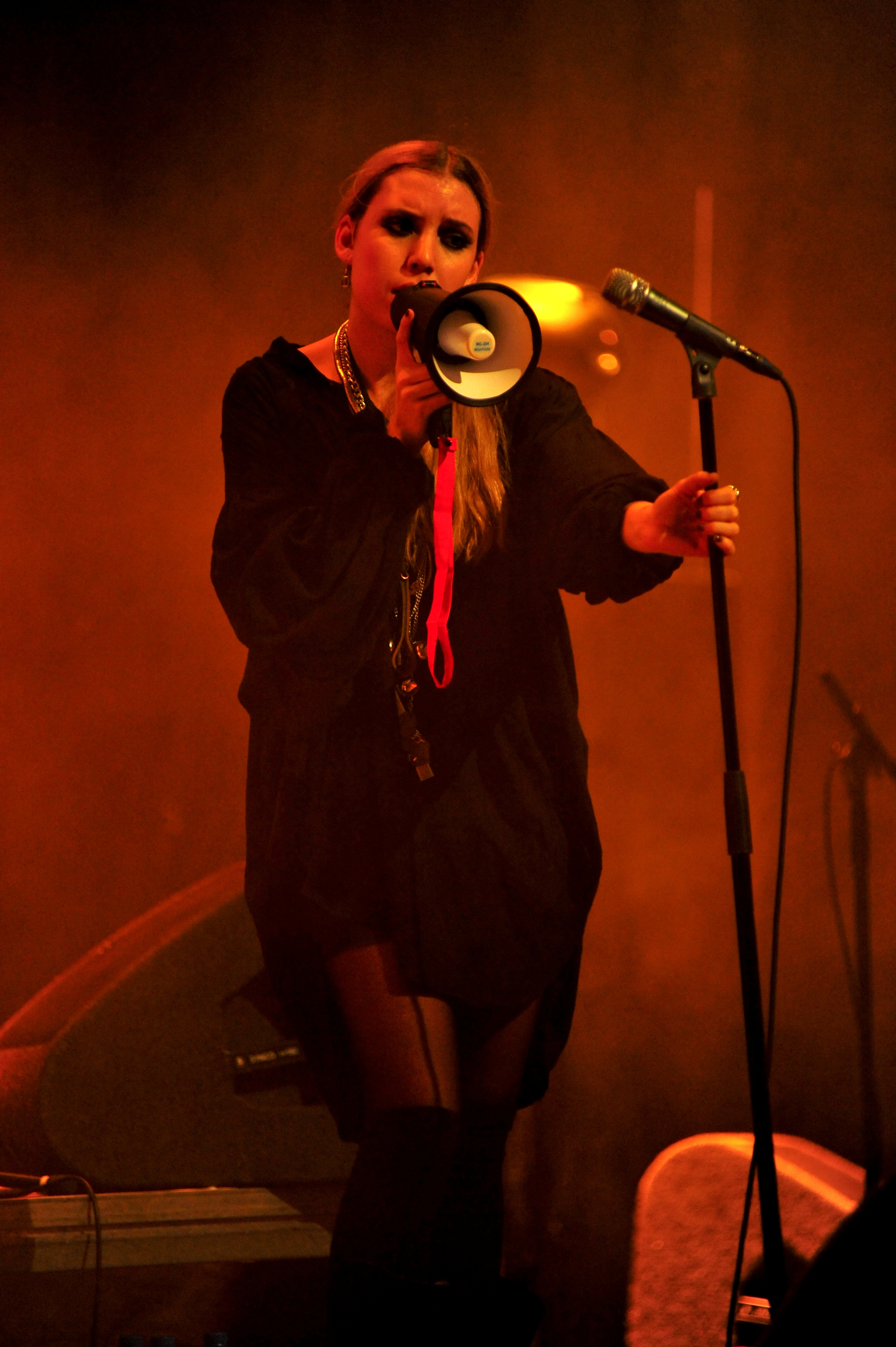
"I Follow Rivers" by Lykke Li (pictured in 2008) was the best-performing song of 2012 on the Airplay 100, despite not reaching number one.

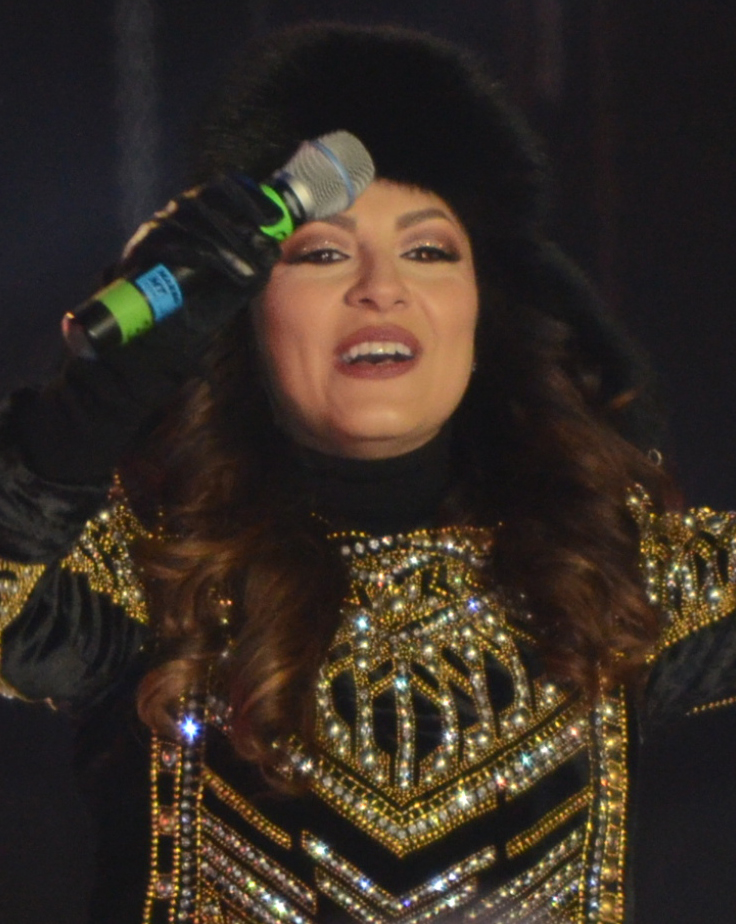
"Inevitabil va fi bine" by Andra (pictured in 2015) was 2013's most-played song in Romania.

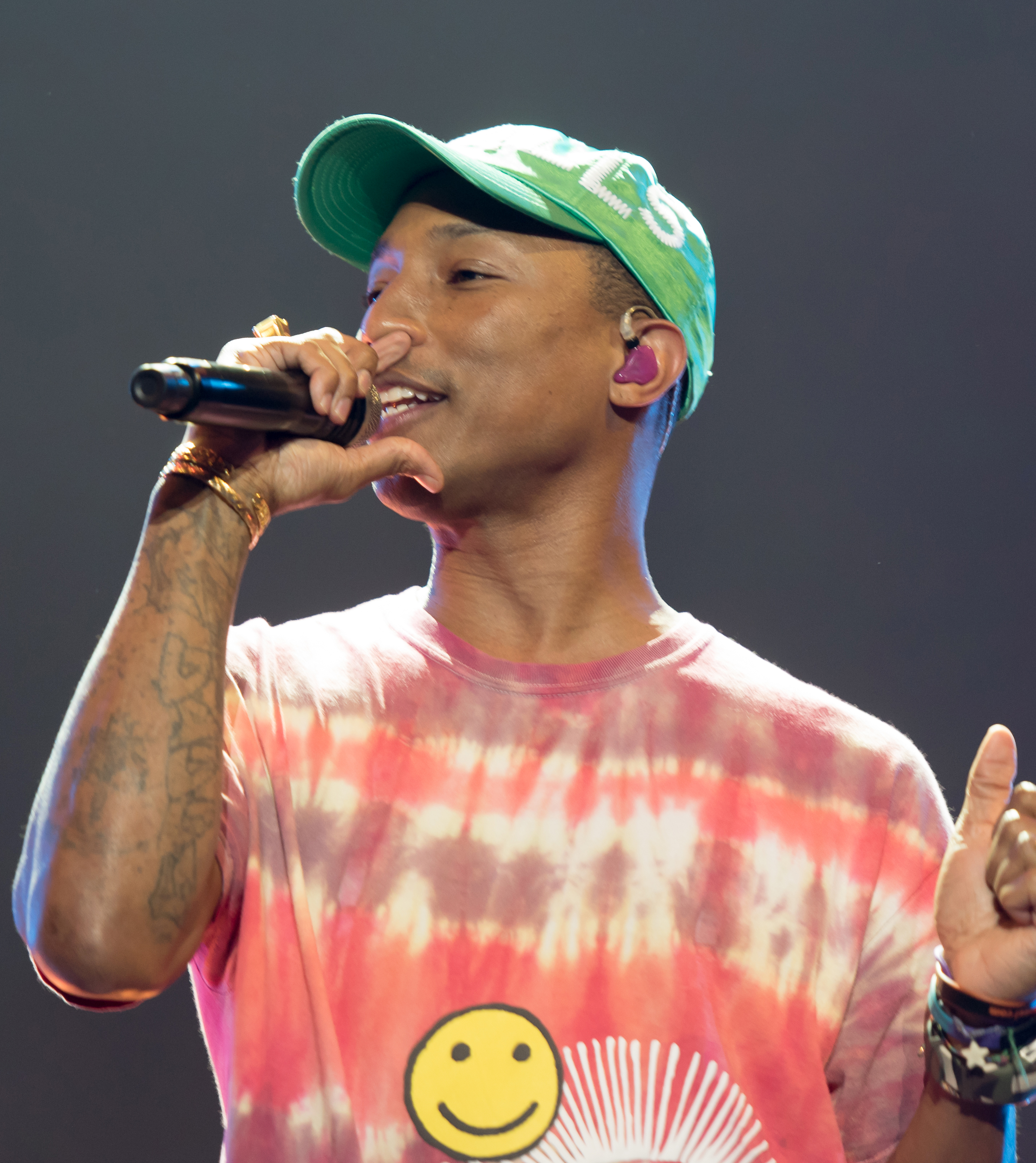
Pharrell Williams's (pictured in 2017) "Happy" was the most-aired song in Romania in 2014.

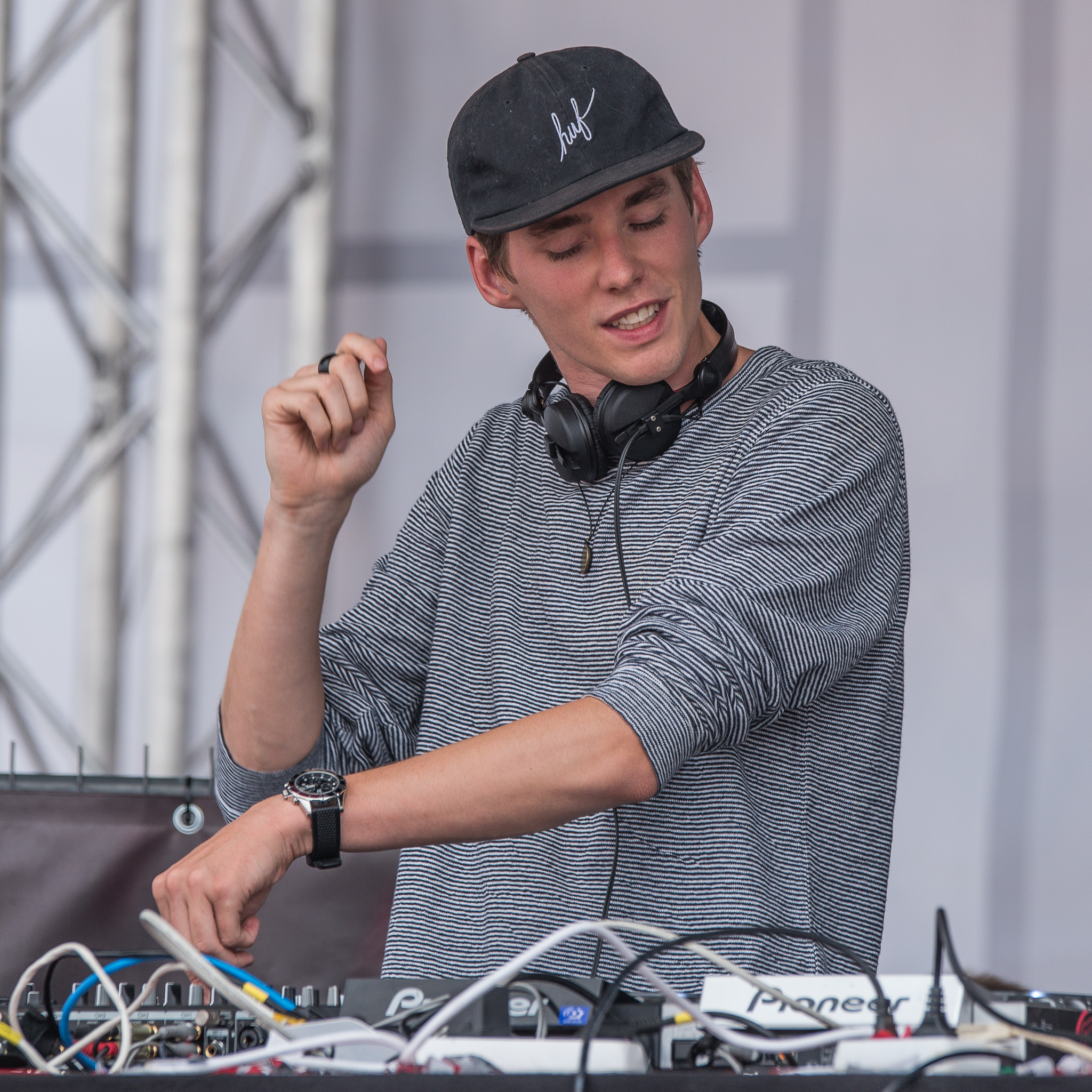
"Are You With Me" by Lost Frequencies (pictured) was 2015's most played on Romanian radio and television.

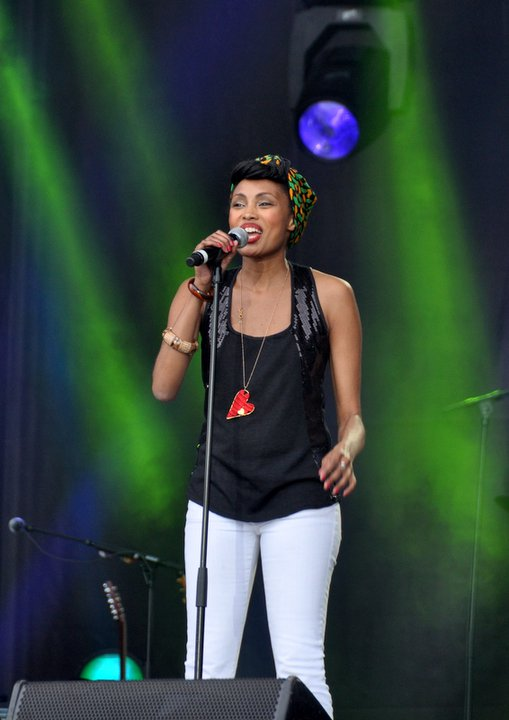
French recording artist Imany's (pictured in 2011) "Don't Be So Shy" topped the Airplay 100 for 12 weeks in 2016.

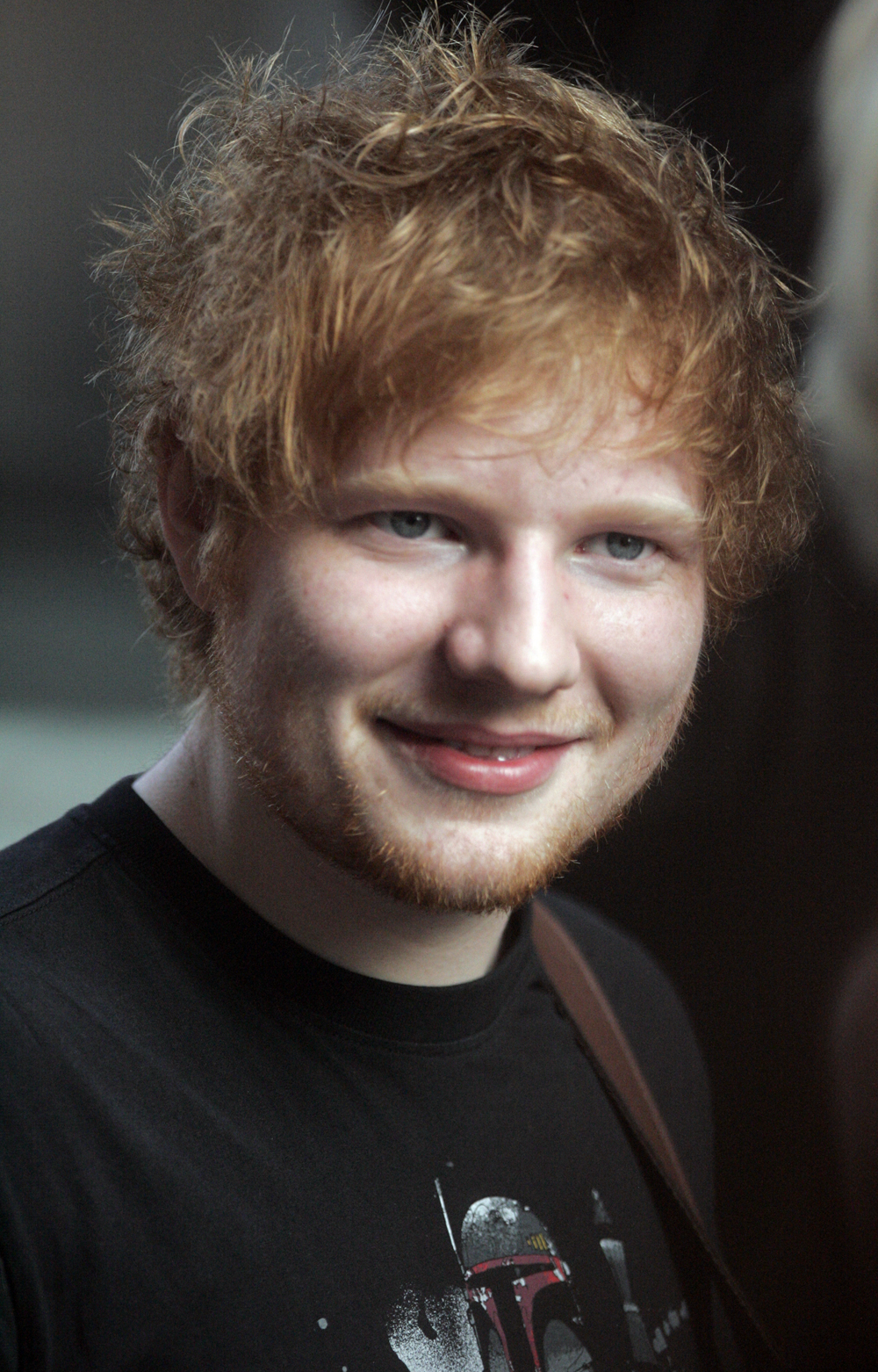
"Shape of You" by English singer Ed Sheeran (pictured in 2013) was the most-aired song of 2017 in Romania.

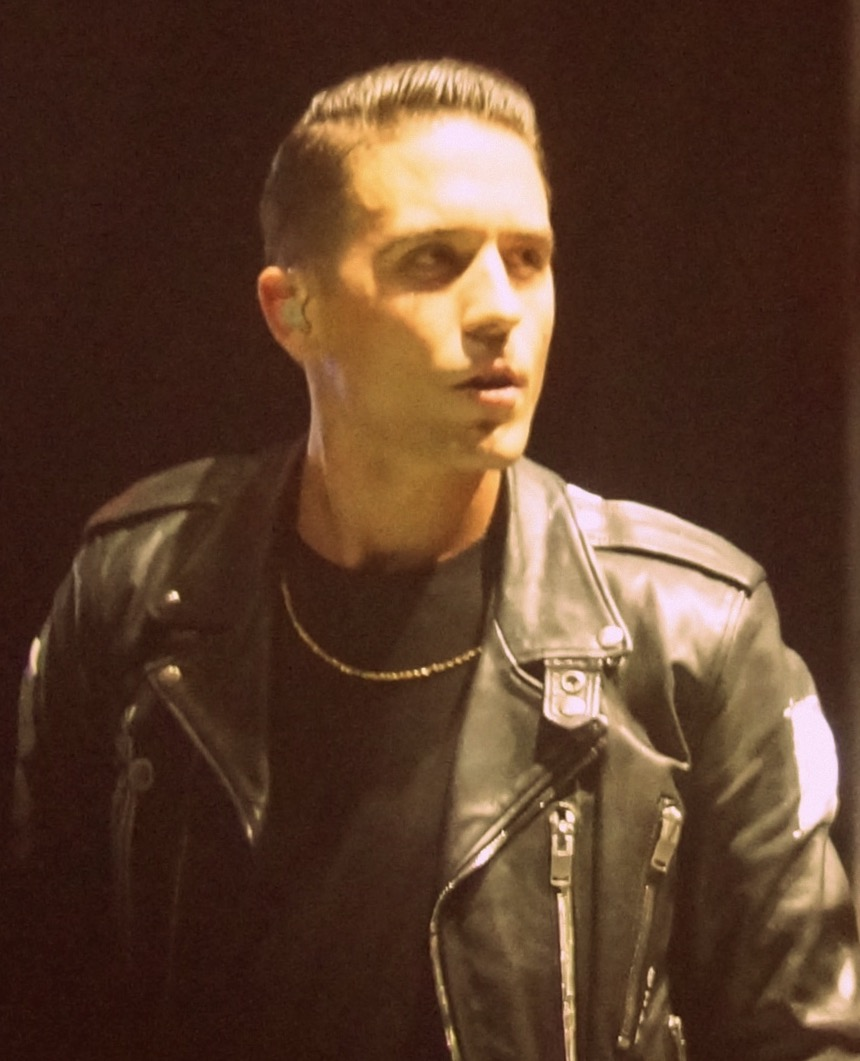
"Him & I" by American rapper G-Eazy (pictured in 2015) and singer Halsey was announced as 2018's most-aired song in Romania.

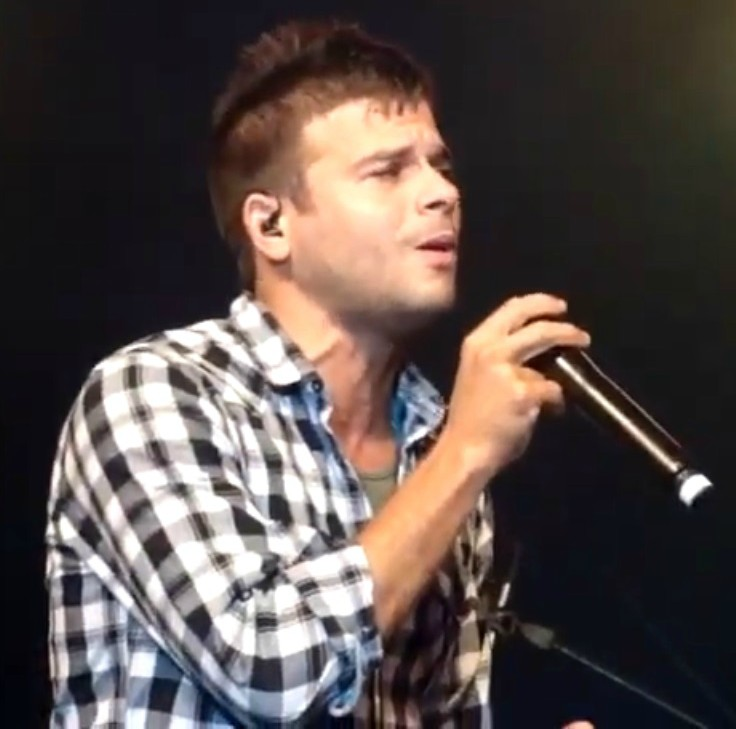
Puerto Rican singers Pedro Capó (pictured) and Farruko's "Calma" spent ten weeks at the summit of the chart in 2019.

List of number-one songs on the Airplay 100 in the 2010s
No.	Artist(s)	Title	Issue date	Wks.
1	Michel Teló	"Ai Se Eu Te Pego"	26 February 2012	3
2	Vunk featuring Antonia	"Pleacă"	18 March 2012	6
3	Laurențiu Duță and Andreea Bănică	"Shining Heart"	29 April 2012	7
4	Gotye featuring Kimbra	"Somebody That I Used to Know"	17 June 2012	2
5	Smiley	"Dead Man Walking"	1 July 2012	3
6	Connect-R	"Vara nu dorm"	22 July 2012	4
7	Alex Velea	"Minim doi"	19 August 2012	2
re	Smiley	"Dead Man Walking"	2 September 2012	1
re	Alex Velea	"Minim doi"	9 September 2012	1
re	Smiley	"Dead Man Walking"	16 September 2012	1
re	Alex Velea	"Minim doi"	23 September 2012	6
8	Ami	"Trumpet Lights"	4 November 2012	3
9	What's Up featuring Andra	"K la meteo"	25 November 2012	5
10	D'banj	"Oliver Twist"	20 January 2013	10
11	Rihanna	"Diamonds"	31 March 2013	2
12	Cabron featuring What's Up and Iony	"Iarna pe val"	14 April 2013	3
13	Antonia	"Marabou"	5 May 2013	2
14	Elena Gheorghe featuring Glance	"Ecou"	19 May 2013	2
15	Macklemore & Ryan Lewis featuring Wanz	"Thrift Shop"	2 June 2013	3
16	Andra	"Inevitabil va fi bine"†	23 June 2013	5
17	Vama	"Perfect fără tine"	28 July 2013	1
18	Naughty Boy featuring Sam Smith	"La La La"	4 August 2013	1
re	Vama	"Perfect fără tine"	11 August 2013	5
re	Naughty Boy featuring Sam Smith	"La La La"	15 September 2013	2
19	Shift featuring Marius Moga	"Sus pe toc"	29 September 2013	4
20	Avicii featuring Aloe Blacc	"Wake Me Up"	27 October 2013	2
21	DJ Sava featuring Raluka and Connect-R	"Aroma"	10 November 2013	1
re	Avicii featuring Aloe Blacc	"Wake Me Up"	17 November 2013	3
22	Grasu XXL featuring Ami	"Déjà Vu"	8 December 2013	1
23	Smiley	"Acasă"	15 December 2013	1
re	Grasu XXL featuring Ami	"Déjà Vu"	19 January 2014	4
24	Milk & Sugar featuring Maria Marquez	"Canto Del Pilon"	16 February 2014	3
re	Smiley	"Acasă"	9 March 2014	3
25	Pharrell Williams	"Happy"†	30 March 2014	7
26	What's Up	"Taxi"	18 May 2014	2
27	3 Sud Est	"Emoții"	1 June 2014	1
re	Pharrell Williams	"Happy"†	8 June 2014	1
re	3 Sud Est	"Emoții"	15 June 2014	4
28	Delia and Uddi	"Ipotecat"	13 July 2014	3
29	Alex Velea	"Din vina ta"	3 August 2014	1
30	Marius Moga	"Pe barba mea"	10 August 2014	3
re	Alex Velea	"Din vina ta"	31 August 2014	1
31	Jason Derulo featuring Snoop Dogg	"Wiggle"	7 September 2014	6
32	Trey Songz	"Na Na"	19 October 2014	2
33	Delia featuring Kaira	"Pe aripi de vânt"	2 November 2014	5
34	John Legend	"All of Me"	14 December 2014	1
re	Delia featuring Kaira	"Pe aripi de vânt"	21 December 2014	1
35	Randi featuring Uddi and Nadir	"Prietena ta"	11 January 2015	3
36	Iggy Azalea featuring Rita Ora	"Black Widow"	1 February 2015	4
37	Inna featuring Marian Hill	"Diggy Down"	1 March 2015	6
38	Shift featuring Andra	"Avioane de hârtie"	12 April 2015	3
39	Lost Frequencies	"Are You with Me"†	3 May 2015	9
40	Wiz Khalifa featuring Charlie Puth	"See You Again"	5 July 2015	1
41	Carla's Dreams featuring Delia	"Cum ne noi"	12 July 2015	9
42	Jo featuring Randi	"Până vara viitoare"	13 September 2015	3
43	Felix Jaehn featuring Jasmine Thompson	"Ain't Nobody (Loves Me Better)"	4 October 2015	4
44	Calvin Harris and Disciples	"How Deep Is Your Love"	8 November 2015	1
45	Andra featuring Cabron	"Niciodată să nu spui niciodată"	15 November 2015	4
46	Lidia Buble featuring Amira	"Le-am spus și fetelor"	13 December 2015	2
47	Ruby featuring Dorian Popa	"Bună, ce mai zici?"	17 January 2016	2
48	Carla's Dreams	"Te rog"	31 January 2016	3
49	Imany	"Don't Be So Shy"†	21 February 2016	3
re	Carla's Dreams	"Te rog"	13 March 2016	1
re	Imany	"Don't Be So Shy"†	20 March 2016	9
50	Carla's Dreams	"Sub pielea mea"	22 May 2016	3
51	Sia featuring Sean Paul	"Cheap Thrills"	12 June 2016	9
52	Carla's Dreams	"Acele"	14 August 2016	6
53	LP	"Lost on You"	25 September 2016	1
re	Carla's Dreams	"Acele"	2 October 2016	1
re	LP	"Lost on You"	9 October 2016	1
54	Irina Rimes	"Visele"	16 October 2016	1
55	Enrique Iglesias featuring Wisin	"Duele el Corazón"	23 October 2016	1
re	LP	"Lost on You"	30 October 2016	1
56	Jo	"Cu un picior în rai"	6 November 2016	1
57	Carla's Dreams	"Imperfect"	13 November 2016	6
58	Randi	"Ochii ăia verzi"	8 January 2017	1
59	Sia featuring Kendrick Lamar	"The Greatest"	15 January 2017	2
re	Randi	"Ochii ăia verzi"	29 January 2017	1
re	Sia featuring Kendrick Lamar	"The Greatest"	5 February 2017	2 (Note: The 19 February 2017 edition of the Airplay 100 was either not published or not archived.)
60	Charlie Puth featuring Selena Gomez	"We Don't Talk Anymore"	26 February 2017	1
61	Salvatore Ganacci featuring Enya and Alex Aris	"Dive"	5 March 2017	1
62	Ed Sheeran	"Shape of You"†	12 March 2017	12
63	Smiley	"De Unde Vii la Ora Asta?"	5 June 2017	5
64	Carla's Dreams	"Până la sânge"	9 July 2017	5
65	Arilena Ara	"Nëntori"	13 August 2017	3
66	DJ Khaled featuring Rihanna and Bryson Tiller	"Wild Thoughts"	3 September 2017	3
re	Arilena Ara	"Nëntori"	24 September 2017	3
67	Maluma	"Felices los 4"	15 October 2017	1
68	Axwell and Ingrosso	"More Than You Know"	22 October 2017	1
69	Dua Lipa	"New Rules"	29 October 2017	9
70	CNCO and Little Mix	"Reggaetón Lento"	14 January 2018	1
71	Camila Cabello and Young Thug	"Havana"	21 January 2018	2
72	Post Malone featuring 21 Savage	"Rockstar"	4 February 2018	5
73	Smiley	"Vals"	11 March 2018	4
74	G-Eazy and Halsey	"Him & I"†	8 April 2018	7
75	Matthew Koma	"Kisses Back"	27 May 2018	4
76	Mahmut Orhan and Colonel Bagshot	"6 Days"	24 June 2018	5
77	Sofía Reyes featuring Jason Derulo and De La Ghetto	"1, 2, 3"	5 August 2018	1
re	Mahmut Orhan and Colonel Bagshot	"6 Days"	12 August 2018	4
78	Brianna	"Lost in Istanbul"	9 September 2018	1
79	Carla's Dreams	"Lacrimi și pumni în pereți"	16 September 2018	6
80	Maroon 5 featuring Cardi B	"Girls Like You"	28 October 2018	1
81	Karmen featuring Krishane	"Lock My Hips"	4 November 2018	3
82	Mark Stam	"Impar"	25 November 2018	1
83	Aya Nakamura	"Djadja"	2 December 2018	3
84	DJ Snake featuring Selena Gomez, Ozuna and Cardi B	"Taki Taki"	23 December 2018	9
85	Carla's Dreams	"Luna"†	10 March 2019	9
86	Pedro Capó and Farruko	"Calma"	12 May 2019	1
re	Carla's Dreams	"Luna"†	17 May 2019	1
re	Pedro Capó and Farruko	"Calma"	26 May 2019	9
87	Minelli	"Mariola"	28 July 2019	2
88	Shawn Mendes and Camila Cabello	"Señorita"	11 August 2019	1
89	The Motans featuring Irina Rimes	"Poem"	18 August 2019	1
re	Shawn Mendes and Camila Cabello	"Señorita"	25 August 2019	7
90	Florian Rus and Mira	"Străzile din București"	13 October 2019	7
91	Tones and I	"Dance Monkey"	1 December 2019	4

=== 2020s ===
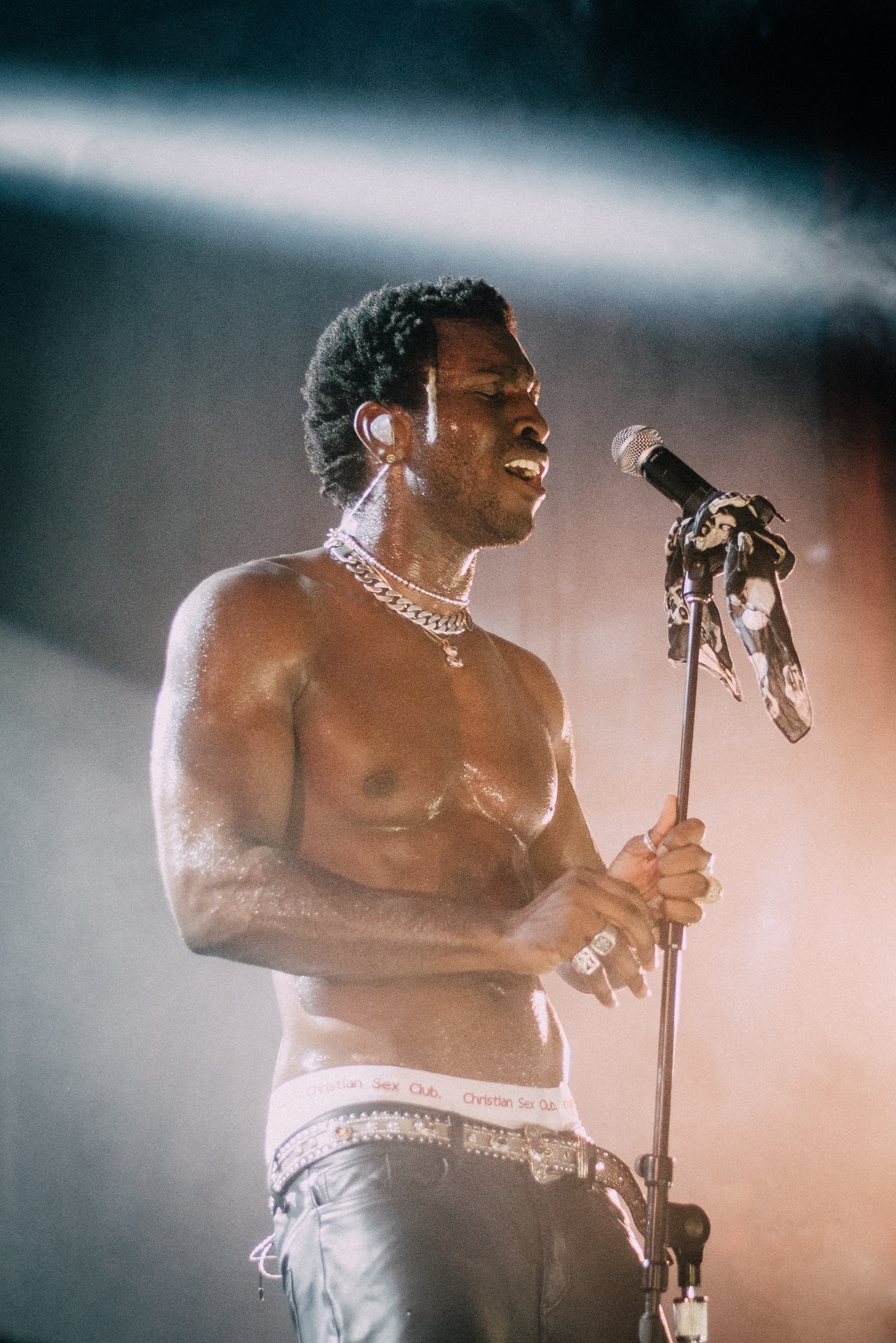
The Imanbek remix of American rapper Saint Jhn's (pictured in 2018) "Roses" was 2020's top song in Romania.

List of number-one songs on the Airplay 100 in the 2020s
No.	Artist(s)	Title	Issue date	Wks.
92	Tones and I	"Dance Monkey"	12 January 2020	3
93	Alec Benjamin	"Let Me Down Slowly"	2 February 2020	1
re	Tones and I	"Dance Monkey"	9 February 2020	2
94	The Black Eyed Peas and J Balvin	"Ritmo (Bad Boys for Life)"	23 February 2020	3
95	Inna and Vinka	"Bebe"	15 March 2020	1
96	Roxen	"Ce-ți cântă dragostea"	22 March 2020	1
re	The Black Eyed Peas and J Balvin	"Ritmo (Bad Boys for Life)"	29 March 2020	1
97	Saint Jhn	"Roses (Imanbek Remix)"	5 April 2020	10
98	Topic and A7S	"Breaking Me"	14 June 2020	7
re	Saint Jhn	"Roses (Imanbek Remix)"	2 August 2020	2
99	Surf Mesa featuring Emilee	"ILY (I Love You Baby)"	16 August 2020	1
100	Jawsh 685 and Jason Derulo	"Savage Love (Laxed – Siren Beat)"	23 August 2020	2
101	DJ Project featuring Andia	"Slăbiciuni"	6 September 2020	2
re	Jawsh 685 and Jason Derulo	"Savage Love (Laxed – Siren Beat)"	20 September 2020	1
102	Master KG featuring Nomcebo	"Jerusalema"	27 September 2020	4
103	Roxen	"Spune-mi"	26 October 2020	1
104	Jason Derulo	"Take You Dancing"	2 November 2020	3
105	Ofenbach and Quarterhead featuring Norma Jean Martine	"Head Shoulders Knees & Toes"	23 November 2020	5
106	Smiley and Delia	"Ne vedem noi"	10 January 2021	2
107	24kGoldn featuring Iann Dior	"Mood"	24 January 2021	1
108	The Motans and Emaa	"Insula"	31 January 2021	1
109	Iuliana Beregoi	"Cum sună liniștea"	7 February 2021	2
110	Jason Derulo and Nuka	"Love Not War (The Tampa Beat)"	21 February 2021	1
111	Alina Eremia	"Noi"	28 February 2021	1
112	Tiësto	"The Business"	7 March 2021	8
113	Masked Wolf	"Astronaut in the Ocean"	2 May 2021	8
114	3 Sud Est and Andra	"Jumătatea mea mai bună"	27 June 2021	6
115	Juno and Jo	"Mă mai ia"	8 August 2021	3
re	Masked Wolf	"Astronaut in the Ocean"	29 August 2021	5
116	Carla's Dreams and Emaa	"N-aud"	3 October 2021	4
117	Pink and Willow Sage Hart	"Cover Me in Sunshine"	31 October 2021	2
118	Connect-R and Smiley	"Rita"	14 November 2021	3

== By artist ==
List of artists with the most number-one songs on the Airplay 100
Artist (Note: Entries both as lead and featured artist are counted.)	No.
Carla's Dreams	9
Smiley	6
Andra	5
Delia	4
Jason Derulo	4
Randi	3
What's Up	3

== By song ==
List of songs with the most cumulative weeks at number-one on the Airplay 100
Artist(s)	Title	Wks. (Note: Total weeks at number one are counted.)
Masked Wolf	"Astronaut in the Ocean"	13
Imany	"Don't Be So Shy"	12
Saint Jhn	"Roses (Imanbek Remix)"	12
Ed Sheeran	"Shape of You"	12
Carla's Dreams	"Luna"	10
D'banj	"Oliver Twist"	10
Carla's Dreams featuring Delia	"Cum ne noi"	9
DJ Snake featuring Selena Gomez, Ozuna and Cardi B	"Taki Taki"	9
Pedro Capó and Farruko	"Calma"	9
Lost Frequencies	"Are You With Me"	9
Dua Lipa	"New Rules"	9
Mahmut Orhan and Colonel Bagshot	"6 Days"	9
Sia featuring Sean Paul	"Cheap Thrills"	9
Tones and I	"Dance Monkey"	9
Alex Velea	"Minim doi"	9
