= Ce Mă Fac Cu Tine de Azi? =

2017 single by Smiley

Single by Smiley featuring Guess Who

from the album Confesiune
- Language: Romanian
- Released: September 10, 2017
- Recorded: 2017
- Genre: Dance-pop, rap
- Length: 3:36
- Label: HaHaHa Production; Cat Music

Smiley singles chronology
"De Unde Vii la Ora Asta?" (2017)	"Ce Mă Fac Cu Tine de Azi?" (2017)	"Vals" (2018)

Music video
- "Ce Mă Fac Cu Tine de Azi?" on YouTube

"Ce Mă Fac Cu Tine de Azi?" (Romanian pronunciation: [ˈtʃe mə ˈfak ku ˈtine de ˈazʲ]; "What am I supposed to do with you from now on?") is a single by Romanian singer Smiley featuring Guess Who from the album Confesiune released on April 10, 2017. The song peaked at number one in the Romania Top 20 charts, spending thirteen weeks there.

== Music video ==
The music video of the song was released alongside the song itself on September 10, 2017, and was directed and produced by Smiley alongside HaHaHa Production staff.

The video was shot in a black & white cromatic style on the outskirts of Bucharest. It starts by showing main artist Smiley walking on an empty country road from the middle of a crop field, seemingly pulling something after him. The video then shows that he is in fact pulling one of his doubles by a long strip of cloth with the camera frequently changing the special effect several times in a continuous cycle. The effect ends by showing secondary artist of the song Guess Who continuing the pulldown as he builds the rapping part of the lyrics. Then the video shows Guess Who pulling a girl after him, frequently exhanging his spot with Smiley another several times. Suddenly, the video shows Smiley pulling the empty sheet as both the girl (presumably his loved one) and Guess Who vanish from the scene. He layes the sheet on the ground and stands on it, just to find himself pulled again by his body double. The video ends by showing him again pulling the empty sheet.

=== Song concept ===
The message of the song talks about relationships apparently destroyed, but actually unfinished. Through the lyrics, Smiley explained that "he imagined how nice it would be if we could manage to express unspoken things with the people next to us, because after all, that's the really important thing in life. The quality of our life is the data of the quality of the relationships we have with the people around us".

== Charts ==
Chart (2017)	Peak position
Romanian top 20	1

== Personnel ==
- Smiley – vocals, production, arrangements
  - Music – Smiley, Florin Boka, Lucian Nagy, Marius Pop, Sergiu Ferat, Șerban Cazan
  - Text – Smiley, Guess Who
  - Video – HaHaHa Video Production (Ionut Trandafir)
  - Additional production – The Donuts - Sergiu Gherman & Tyler Mehlenbacher

== Release history ==
- 2017 Romania: CD (as part of Confesiune) Cat Music 101 2838 2
- 2017 Romania: CD (as part of Confesiune) HaHaHa Production 101 2838 2
