= Feli (singer) =

Romanian singer (born 1986)

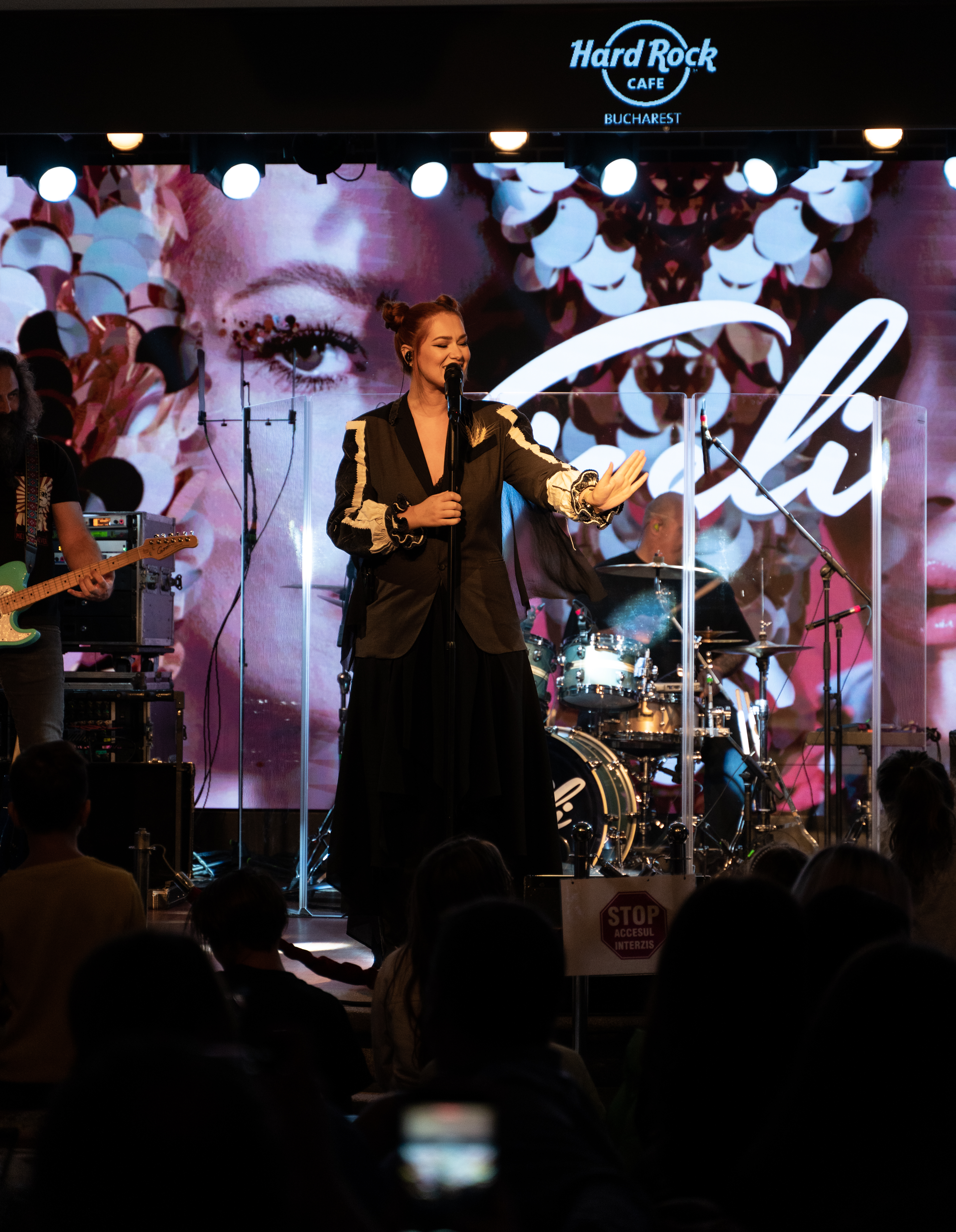
- Feli at Hard Rock Cafe Bucharest in October 2022

Background information
- Born: Felicia Donose; 15 June 1986 (age 40); Sebeș, Romania
- Genres: Pop; EDM
- Occupations: Singer; songwriter
- Years active: 2012–present
- Labels: HaHaHa Production; Cat Music

Felicia Donose (Romanian pronunciation: [felˈit͡ʃja donˈose]; born 15 June 1986) better known by her stage name Feli is a Romanian singer and songwriter. She rose to fame in 2012 with her participation in the music show Vocea României.

In October 2014, she released her first single, "Cine te crezi" (Who Do You Think You Are), in collaboration with HaHaHa Production and Cat Music, immediately impressing the audience. The song topped the music charts and earned her a nomination for Best Romanian Act at the 2016 MTV EMA Awards. The music video for the song surpassed 10 million views, confirming the artist's success.

In the following years, Feli consolidated his position in the music industry by releasing the hit "Creioane colorate" (Couloured Crayons) and collaborating with some of the biggest artists in Romania.

== Musical career ==
=== Early years ===
Her musical debut took place in her teenage years when she was both the vocalist and songwriter for the pop-rock band Aliens. Feli collaborated with Edi Schneider, also known as Dj Phantom, and then turned to the hip-hop genre, where she was involved in several musical projects with Grasu XXL, Puya and Guess Who.

=== Vocea României (2012) ===
In 2012, Feli participated in the Season 2 of musical competition Vocea României, where she was part of Marius Moga's team, with whom she reached the semifinals, being one of the contestants credited with the greatest chances of winning the competition. During the competition, she performed songs from the repertoire of Lady Gaga, Alicia Keys, Adele, En Vogue and Rihanna.

=== 2014–2019 ===
Starting in 2014, Feli decided to join the HaHaHa Production team and work on her own musical project. In October 2014, the artist released the first single of her career, "Cine te crezi" (Who Do You Think You Are) which was very appreciated by the listeners. Also in 2014, Feli collaborated with B.U.G. Mafia for the song "Să cânte trompetele" (Let The Trumpets Sing), a composition signed by Tataee, with lyrics written by the 3 members of the band.

In 2015, Feli released the song "Gelozia" (Jealousy) featuring rapper Speak. The song was released during the #maimusic campaign, managing to collect over 3.5 million views on YouTube. The song was directed by Ionuț Trandafir and is a HaHaHa Production production, being composed by the artist, along with Șerban Cazan and Speak. Also during the same period, Feli released two more songs: "Perfect for You", along with Dorian, and "10 Minutes", a collaboration with Smiley.

At the end of 2015, Feli released the song "Creioane colorate". The song reminds us that every day can be a new beginning in which we can discover things, see the world with all its beauty and be grateful for what we have received. Her message is complemented by a moving music video, directed by Catrinel Danaiata. In 2016, Feli released the songs "Va urma" (To be continued) – whose video is directed by Iulian Moga, the song being composed and produced in HaHaHa Production studios and released in co-production with Cat Music – and "Timpul" (Time).

2017 began with the release of a rock remake of one of Maria Tănase's most famous songs, "Cine iubește și lasă" (Who Loves And Leaves). This year she also released a featuring with Connect-R, "Ceartă artă" (Art Of Arguing), and continued with the single "Acasă" (Home), which garnered over 14 million views. The release of the first album, "Eu sunt Feli" (I Am Feli), took place in November and was materialized through an event attended by over 150 guests at the Metropolis Theater and 180,000 people live on Facebook. It contains seven new songs, but also some already known ones such as "Acasă", "Creioane colorate", "Timpul" or "Va urma".

2018 was marked by a series of hits, including "Bună de iubit" (Fit to be loved), with which she participated in the 2018 national selection that decided Romania's representative at Eurovision, where she ranked 3rd.

The artist released a total of 7 songs in 2018, many of which reached radio and TV charts. Among the songs released are: "Rațele și vânătorii" (Ducks and the Hunters), "Vals" (Waltz) (feat. Smiley), "Facil de amar" (Easily Bitter), "Două inimi" (Two Hearts), "Spune-mi tot" (Tell Me Everything) (feat. Grasu XXL & Guess Who), "Toți demonii mei" (All Of My Demons) (feat. Vunk).

=== 2019–2025 ===
Feli released one of the most popular songs of the year: "When the Sun Rises". By the end of the year, Feli had released several more successful songs, including: "Omule, deschide ochii" (Man, Open Your Eyes), the first tab in her musical diary "Feli din poveste" (Feli From The Story), "Hainele și carnea" (The Clothes And The Flesh), "Frunze cad" (Leaves Fall) and "Ultimul val" (Last Wave) (feat. Jean Gavril).

2020 was a year full of music for the artist's community. It was marked by songs such as "Sus pe munte" (Up In The Mountains) or "Banii n-aduc fericirea" (Money Don't Bring Happiness) (feat. Grasu XXL). The year was marked by the song with Grasu XXL, which is a remake of the well-known old song of the same name, performed by Generic. It ranked 19th in the top 100 most played songs on radio and TV in 2020, according to Media Forest. Among the songs released in 2020 are "Împreună" (Together), "Mă strigă mama" (Mom Is Calling), "Amintirile" (Memories), "Du-te dorule" (Go Away Longing) and "Vântul bate" (Wind Blows). All the songs listed are part of the folk-influenced album "Feli din poveste", which continued into 2021.

2021 marked the end of a long chapter in Feli's musical career. With the songs "Bade, tu ești pui de drac" (Man, You're A Devil's Baby) and "Puiule, Puiuțule" (Little Little Baby) she closes the chapter "Feli din poveste" and makes the transition, both musically and personally, to a new version. Also, in the same year, the artist joined the Disney universe with the song "Chiar de azi" (From Today On), a song dedicated to Disney princesses. 2021 is the year in which the artist makes the transition to a new style and sound. Even though the artist has updated her music, she has kept her essence, demonstrating this in the single of the year, "Adu-ți aminte" (Remember). Feli ends the year with a Christmas carol - "Moș Crăciun ești și tu" (You Are A Santa Claus Too).

2022 is a year of musical experimentation, with the artist approaching a new style. Feli has released no less than 5 songs, including "Liberă din nou" (Free Again) (feat. Jean Gavril), "Flori de argint" (Silver Flowers), "Când te tîn în brațe" (When I'm Holding You In My Arms), "Dragoste nebuna" (Crazy Love) and the single with which she ended the year - "Promit" (I Promise). The latter single is considered one of the best songs for the bride and groom to dance to. The artist's community confirms this - more than 10,000 people have used the song's sound on TikTok. For Feli, 2023 meant the release of the songs "Tu, poezie" (You A Poem), "Iubirea ca la piață" (Love At The Market), and a collaboration with Romanian trapper Nane for the song "Până-n zori" (Till Dawn).

In 2024, Feli released the song "Ne iubim" (We're In Love) considered a sequel to the song "Promit". "Ne iubim" is also considered a suitable song for the bride and groom's dance. The music video for the song was filmed in Bucharest, at "Cinema Europa". "Ce bine e" is another song that Feli released this year. This time, it's a Live Session, filmed at Mogoșoaia Palace. In the fall of 2024, Feli released the song "Water and Earth" - a story about love and hope. Feli released, in collaboration with Grasu XXL, the song "Fostu'" (The Ex), a co-production of HaHaHa Production, Cat Music and DefJam Recordings Romania. Moreover, she tried, once again, another approach to a new type of music, releasing the song "Drama Mama".

== Discography ==
=== Studio albums ===
List of studio albums
Title	Album details
Eu sunt Feli	Released: 2017; Format: CD, digital download; Label: Cat Music
Din Poveste	Released: 2021; Format: CD, digital download; Label: Cat Music

=== Singles ===
==== As lead artist ====
- Cine te crezi (2014)
- Gelozia /feat. Speak/ (2015)
- Perfect for You (2015)
- Creioane colorate (2015)
- Va urma (2016)
- Timpul (2016)
- Acasă (2017)
- Bună de iubit (2018)
- Facil de amar (2018)
- Două inimi (2018)
- Rațele și vânătorii (2018)
- Hainele și carnea (2019)
- Când răsare soarele (2019)
- Frunze cad (2019)
- Sus pe munte (2020)
- Împreună (2020)
- Mă strigă mama (2020)
- Banii n-aduc fericirea (2020)
- Amintirile (2020)
- Du-te dorule (2020)
- Vântul bate (2020)
- Bade, tu ești pui de drac (2021)
- Puiule, puiuțule (2021)
- Chiar de azi (Disney Princess Song) (2021)
- Adu-ți aminte (2021)
- Moș Crăciun ești și tu (2021)
- Liberă din nou /feat. Jean Gavril/ (2022)
- Flori de argint (2022)
- Când te țin în brațe (2022)
- Dragoste nebună (2022)
- Promit (2022)
- Tu, poezie (2023)
- Iubirea ca la piață (2023)
- Până-n zori / feat. NANE (2023)
- Ne iubim (2024)
- Ce bine e (2024)
- Apă și pământ (2024)
- Moș Crăciun ești și tu / LIVE, Sala Palatului/ (2024)
- Fostu' / feat. Grasu XXL (2025)
- Drama Mama (2025)

==== As featured artist ====
- Spune Dacă Faci, Part. III/ Codu' Penal feat. Feli/ (2006)
- Prima piatră /Silviu Pasca feat. Feli/ (2013)
- 10 Minutes /Smiley feat. Feli/ (2015)
- Să cânte trompetele /B.U.G. Mafia feat. Feli/ (2014)
- Time /Paul Damixie feat. Feli/ (2016)
- Hopai Diri Da /Damian & Brothers feat. Feli/ (2016)
- Ce mai vrei /Sore feat. Feli/ (2017)
- Ceartă artă /Feli feat. Connect-R/ (2017)
- Mă faci să simt ca... /Guess Who feat. Feli/ (2017)
- Trandafire /Damian Drăghici feat. Feli/ (2017–2018)
- Averile /JUNO feat. Feli/ (2017–2018)
- Vals /Smiley & Feli/ (2018)
- Spune-mi tot /Grasu XXL & Guess Who feat. Feli/ (2018)
- Toți demonii mei /Vunk feat. Feli/ (2018)
- Ultimul val /Jean Gavril și Feli/

== Awards and nominations ==
=== MTV Europe Music Awards ===
Year	Nominee / work	Award	Result	Ref.
2016	Herself	Best Romanian Act	Nominated	
