= Smiley (singer) =

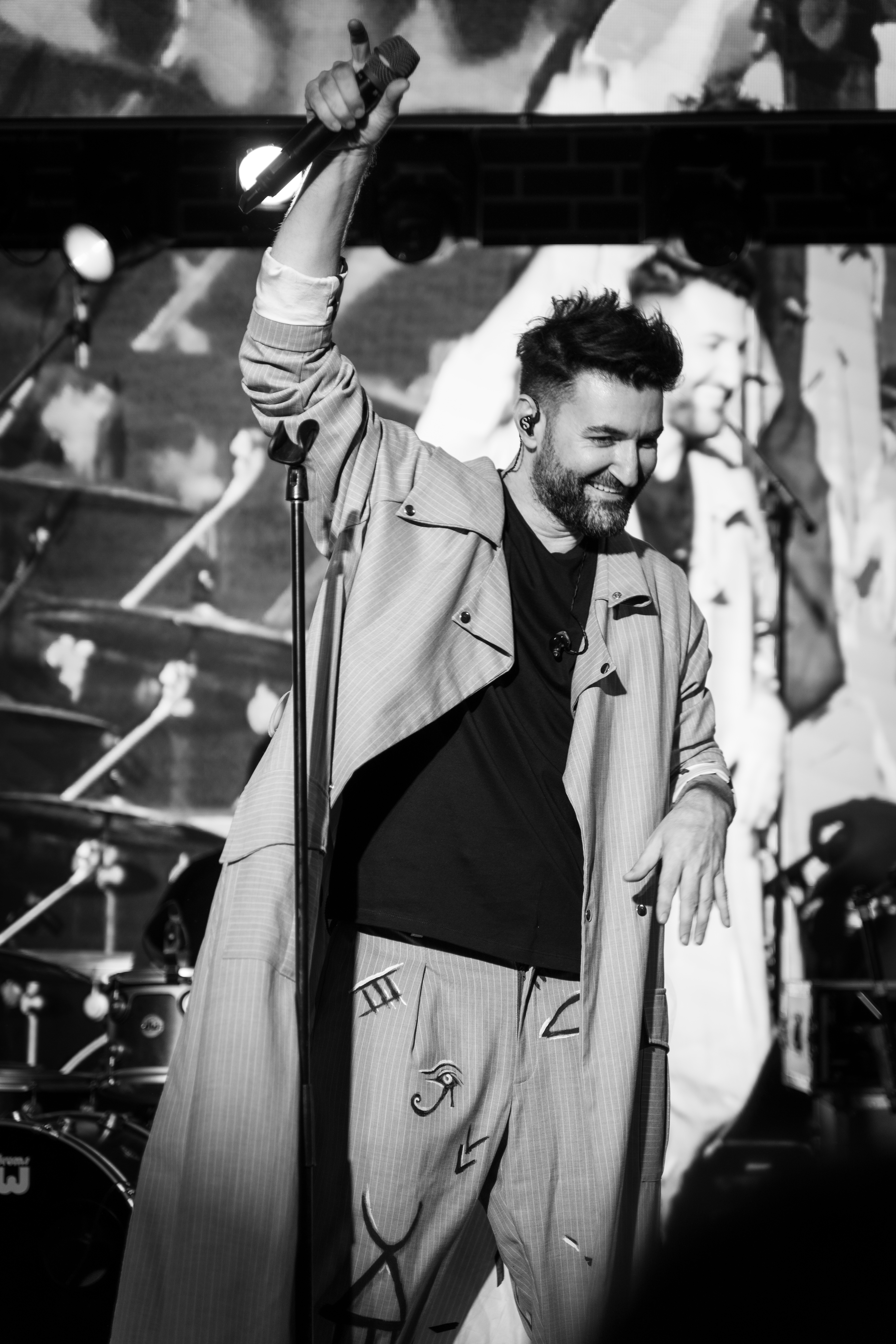
- Smiley performing at Hard Rock Cafe Bucharest in 2022

Background information
- Born: Andrei Tiberiu Maria; 27 July 1983 (age 43); Pitești, Romania
- Genres: Pop; dance; funk; soul; R&B; EDM
- Occupations: Singer; songwriter; record producer; actor; television presenter
- Years active: 2001–present
- Labels: Cat Music; HaHaHa Production
- Spouse: Gina Pistol (m. 2023)
- Website: smiley.ro
- Children: 1

Andrei Tiberiu Maria (Romanian pronunciation: [anˈdrej tiˈberju maˈri.a]; born 27 July 1983), better known by his stage name Smiley, is a Romanian singer, songwriter, record producer, actor and television presenter, from Pitești. He was part of the pop groups Simplu (2001–2011) and Radio Killer (2009–2015). As a solo artist, Smiley started in 2007 and has become one of Romania's biggest pop artists, archiving 14 number ones and more than 30 Top20 singles.

In 2013, he won "Best Romanian Act" during the MTV Europe Music Awards held in Amsterdam. He had been nominated as a solo act three times for the same award in 2008, 2009 and 2011 and twice in 2006 and 2007 as part of Simplu. He is part of the Romanian Euro-House project Radio Killer where he is known as Killer 1. As of November 2013, he is the new Goodwill Ambassador for UNICEF Romania.

He is also a television personality, having hosted Românii au talent (2011–present) and being a coach in Vocea României (2011–present).

== History ==
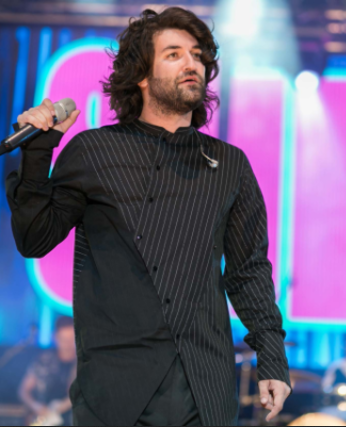
Smiley in 2016.

He started in music at a very young age. For three years he was part of the Romanian group Millenium 3 and was noted by Gyuri Pascu as a potential star. He also tried for the band Akcent in a bid to join the band.

=== Simplu ===
After an invitation by CRBL, he joined the singing and dancing band Simplu (stylized as SIMPLU). The members were CRBL, Smiley, OmuNegru, Piticu, Francezu and Taz. Because of his reported cheerful attitude, he was nicknamed Smiley by the band, a name he adopted for his career, soon becoming the frontman of the band, at the same time developing a solo career.

Simplu released five studio albums with Smiley: Oare știi (2002), Zece (2004), RMX Simplu (2006), Oficial îmi merge bine (2006) and "Dance or die trying" (2011) in addition to the compilation Simplu Best Of. In 2008, Smiley and Simplu won "Best show" during the dance program Istoria Dansului. In 2007–2008, he was also in the TV series One Step Ahead as Sebastian 'Seba' Novinski and subject of lead role in the 2008 film Un film simplu directed by Tom Gatsoulis.

=== Radio Killer ===
Smiley has also formed the Romanian Euro-House project Radio Killer launched through an initiative of Smiley and his HaHaHa Production company. Radio Killer is made up of seven members:

- Killer 1: Smiley
- Killer 2: EleFunk (Serban-Ionut Cazan)
- Killer 3: CellBlock
- Killer 4: Karie
- Killer 5: Boogie Man (Don Baxter)
- Killer 6: Crocodealer (Alex Velea)
- The Real Killer: Paul Damixie

The group released the single "Be Free" in 2010 on Blanco Y Negro label, the international release "Lonely Heart" on various labels in Romania, France, Spain, Italy, Netherlands and Sweden in 2011 and "Don't Let The Music End" on EMI in 2012. The band also enjoys popularity in Russia. In 2013, Radio Killer released a joint EP Clothes Off with Francesco Diaz & Young Rebels with various mixes of their hit "Clothes Off".

== Others ventures ==
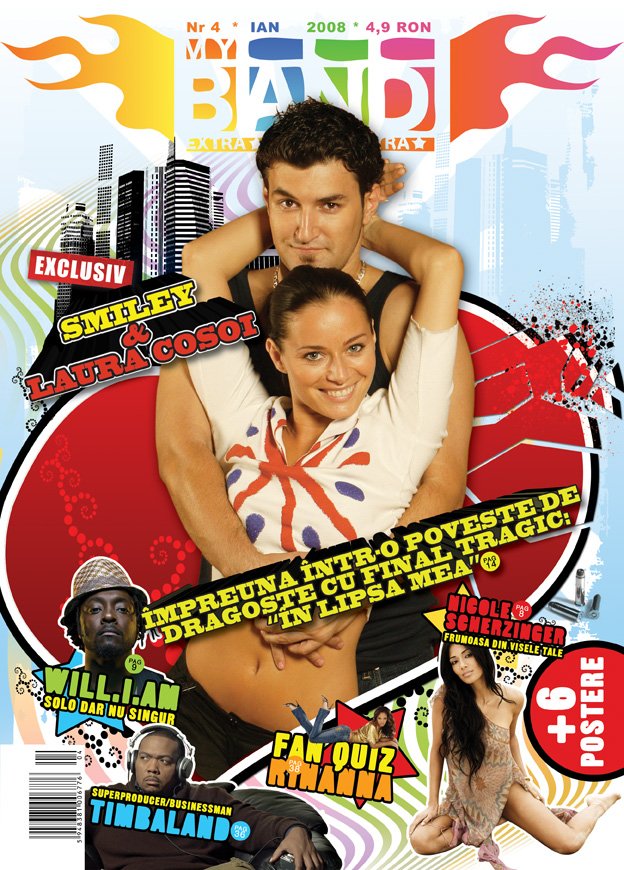
Smiley headlining no. 4 of the "MyBand" magazine alongside his then-time girlfriend, Laura Cosoi.

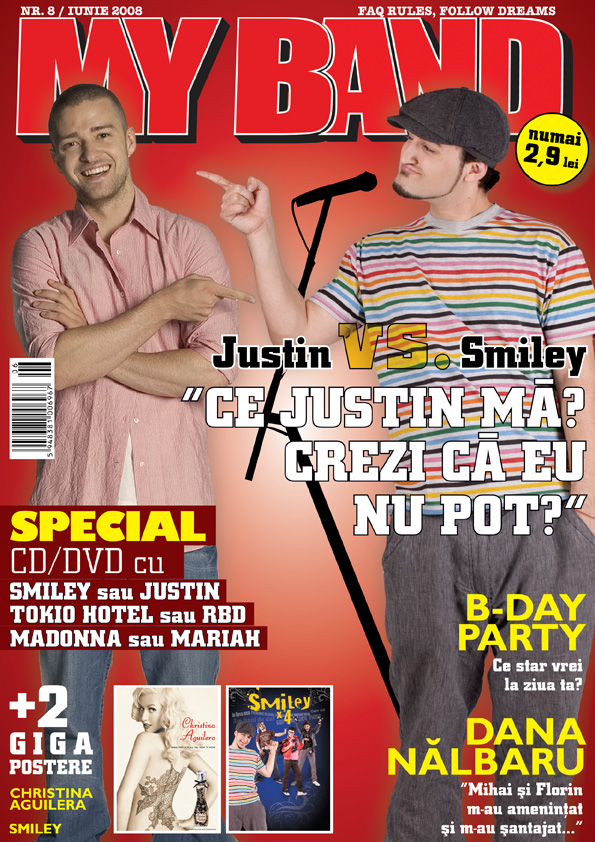
Smiley headlining no. 8 of the "MyBand" magazine alongside Justin Timberlake.

=== Acting ===
In 2008, he had the lead role in the comedy Un film simplu by director Tom Gatsoulis. The comedy inspired by the group Simplu and Smiley's career, is about the difficult choices Smiley had to make: his bandmates and friends or international fame as he is confronted by an American talent scout who is offering him a lucrative deal provided he quits his band, Simplu. The band members realize what's going on and they don't like it.

=== Television ===
Smiley has been a television personality co-hosting the TV show Românii au talent with Pavel Bartoș for eight consecutive seasons, starting with the inaugural season 1 in 2011.

He was also invited as a presiding judge in Vocea României, the Romanian version of the international music competition franchise The Voice. Ştefan Stan from Team Smiley won the first ever title in Romania for season 1 of the show. Ştefan Stan released his debut album Povestea mea with Smiley's production HaHaHa productions; releasing "You Give Me Love" written by his coach Smiley before signing a deal with Universal Music Romania.

== Discography ==
=== Studio albums ===
List of studio albums
Title	Album details	Certifications
În lipsa mea	Released: 14 March 2008; Format: CD, digital download; Label: Cat Music	UPFR: Gold
Plec pe Marte	Released: 30 March 2010; Format: CD, digital download; Label: Cat Music	
Acasă	Released: 21 November 2013; Format: CD, digital download; Label: Cat Music HaHaHa Production	
Confesiune	Released: 10 December 2017; Format: CD, digital download; Label: Cat Music HaHaHa Production	

=== EPs ===
List of EPs
Title	Album details
Mai Mult De-O Viață	Released: 17 February 2022; Format: Digital download; Label: Cat Music

=== Singles ===
==== As lead artist ====
List of singles, with selected chart positions
Title	Year	Peak chart positions			Album
Title	Year	ROM	BUL	CIS	Album
"În Lipsa Mea" (featuring Uzzi)	2007	3	—	—	În lipsa mea
"Designed to Love You"	2008	29	—	—	În lipsa mea
"Preocupat Cu Gura Ta"	2008	8	—	—	În lipsa mea
"Am Bani de Dat" (featuring Alex Velea, Don Baxter and Marius Moga)	2008	11	—	—	În lipsa mea
"Plec pe Marte" (featuring Cheloo)	2010	3	—	—	Plec pe Marte
"Love Is for Free" (featuring Pacha Man)	2010	1	12	—	Plec pe Marte
"Dream Girl"	2011	1	33	—	Plec pe Marte
"Dead Man Walking"	2012	1	2	—	Acasă
"Cai Verzi pe Pereți" (featuring Alex Velea and Don Baxter)	2012	1	—	—	Non-album singles
"Dincolo de Cuvinte" (featuring Alex Velea)	2013	3	—	—	Non-album singles
"Acasă"	2013	1	—	—	Acasă
"Criminal" (featuring Kaan)	2013	13	—	—	Acasă
"Nemuritori"	2014	30	—	—	Acasă
"I Wish"	2014	13	—	—	Acasă
"Oarecare"	2015	1	—	—	Non-album singles
"Insomnii"	2016	6	—	—	Confesiune
"Îndrăgostit (Deși n-am Vrut)"	2016	5	—	—	Confesiune
"De Unde Vii la Ora Asta?"	2017	1	—	—	Confesiune
"Ce Mă Fac Cu Tine de Azi?" (featuring Guess Who)	2017	1	—	—	Confesiune
"Vals" (featuring Feli)	2017	1	—	—	Confesiune
"Aprinde Scânteia" (featuring Dorian)	2018	4	—	—	Non-album singles
"Jumătate" (featuring Sore)	2019	4	—	—	Non-album singles
"Song About Nothing"	2019	35	—	—	Non-album singles
"My Love"	2019	9	—	—	Non-album singles
"Ce Mai Faci, Străine?"	2020	1	—	—	Non-album singles
"Va fi Bine"	2020	59	—	—	Non-album singles
"Ne Vedem Noi"" (featuring Delia)	2020	1	—	—	Non-album singles
"Lasa Inima să Zbiere" (featuring Killa Fonic)	2021	4	—	—	Non-album singles
"Noi Doi si Noaptea"	2021	6	—	—	Non-album singles
"Rita" (featuring Connect-R)	2021	1	—	—	Non-album singles
"Purtat De Vânt"	2022	3	—	172	Mai Mult De-O Viață
"Scumpă Foc" (featuring Juno)	2022	1	—	79	Non-album singles
"Aia E"	2023	1	—	—	Non-album singles
"—" denotes releases that did not chart or were not released in that territory.

==== As featured artist ====
List of singles, with selected chart positions
Title	Year	Peak chart positions	Album
Title	Year	ROM	Album
"Îmi Place La Tine Tot" (Corina featuring Smiley and Don Baxter)	2005	10	Îmi place... Tot!
"Secretul Mariei" (Delia featuring Smiley)	2006	—	Listen Up!
"Hooky Song" (Andreea Bănică featuring Smiley)	2008	8	Best of Andreea Bănică
"Dangeros” (Connect-R featuring Smiley)	2008	—	Dacă Dragostea Dispare
"Da-o Tare" (Cabron featuring Smiley and Guess Who)	2013	3	Lupu' DPM
"Statul" (Don Baxter featuring Smiley)	2014	53	Non-album singles
"Sexual” (Dorian featuring Smiley)	2015	—	Non-album singles
"Pierdut Buletin" (DOC & Motzu featuring Smiley)	2015	7	DOC & Motzu în HD
"În Stație la Lizeanu (Domnișoară Domnișoară)" (Damian & Brothers featuring Smiley)	2016	10	Gypsy Rock: Change or Die
"Lumea Noua" (Grasu XXL featuring Smiley)	2017	—	Non-album singles
"The Dreamers” (Markus Schulz featuring Smiley)	2019	—	We Are the Light
"Ai Grija de Femeia Ta" (Marius Moga featuring Smiley)	2019	70	Non-album singles
"Sâmbătă Seara" (ADDA featuring Smiley)	2020	5	Non-album singles
"Uită-mă" (Emilian featuring Smiley)	2020	—	Non-album singles
"Doar Vina Ta" (Andra featuring Smiley)	2022	1	Non-album singles
"Copacul" (Spike featuring Smiley)	2023	—	Non-album singles
"—" denotes releases that did not chart or were not released in that territory.

==== Promotional singles ====
Title	Year	Album
"10 Minutes" (with Feli)	2014	Non-album singles
"Cine-i Salvează pe Eroi?" (featuring Cabron)	2020	Non-album singles
"Adeline"	2020	Non-album singles
"Până la Tine"	2021	Non-album singles
"Fizz Up"	2021	Non-album singles
"Până Când"	2021	Non-album singles
"Nu Mai Exista Dup-aia"	2021	Non-album singles
"Colecționarea"	2022	Non-album singles
"Neintenționat" (with Emilian and Juno)	2023	Non-album singles
"Pata" (with Mario Fresh and RENVTØ)	2023	Non-album singles

=== Other appearances ===
Title	Year	Other artists	Album
"Cu Fuioru"	2014	Pavel Bartoș	Best of Românii au Talent Sezonul 4
"Fii Tot Ce Poți"	2022	Șatra B.E.N.Z.	Legații
"Și Astăzi, Și Mâine"	2022	Horia Moculescu	Legații
"Ramon"	2023	Pavel Bartoș	Ramon

== Filmography ==
=== Television ===
Year	Title	Role	Notes
2006	Dancing with the Stars Romania	Contestant	Season 2
2007–2008	Cu un Pas Înainte	Sebastian "Seba" Novinski	Main role
2011–present	Românii au talent	Presenter	
2011–present	Vocea României	Judge / Coach	
2019	101 Dalmatian Street	Dylan (singing voice only)	Romanian dub
2021	SuperStar România	Judge	

=== Film ===
Year	Title	Role	Notes
2011	Nașa	Priest Andrei	
2013	Oldschool Renegades	Himself	
2014	Selfie	Pepenar "Pepe"	
2016	Storks	Toady (voice)	Romanian dub
2018	Smallfoot	Percy (voice)	Romanian dub
2019	Oh, Ramona!	Police	
2022	Odată Pentru Totdeauna	Alex Zota	
2022	Legații	Răzvan	
2023	Ramon	Tom	

== Awards and nominations ==
- 2006 and 2007: Nominated as part of Simplu (twice)
- 2008, 2009 and 2011: Nominated as a solo act (three times)
- 2013: Won "Best Romanian Act" (once)
