= Bucharest Old Town =

Sector in Bucharest

Coordinates: 44°25′52″N 26°06′03″E

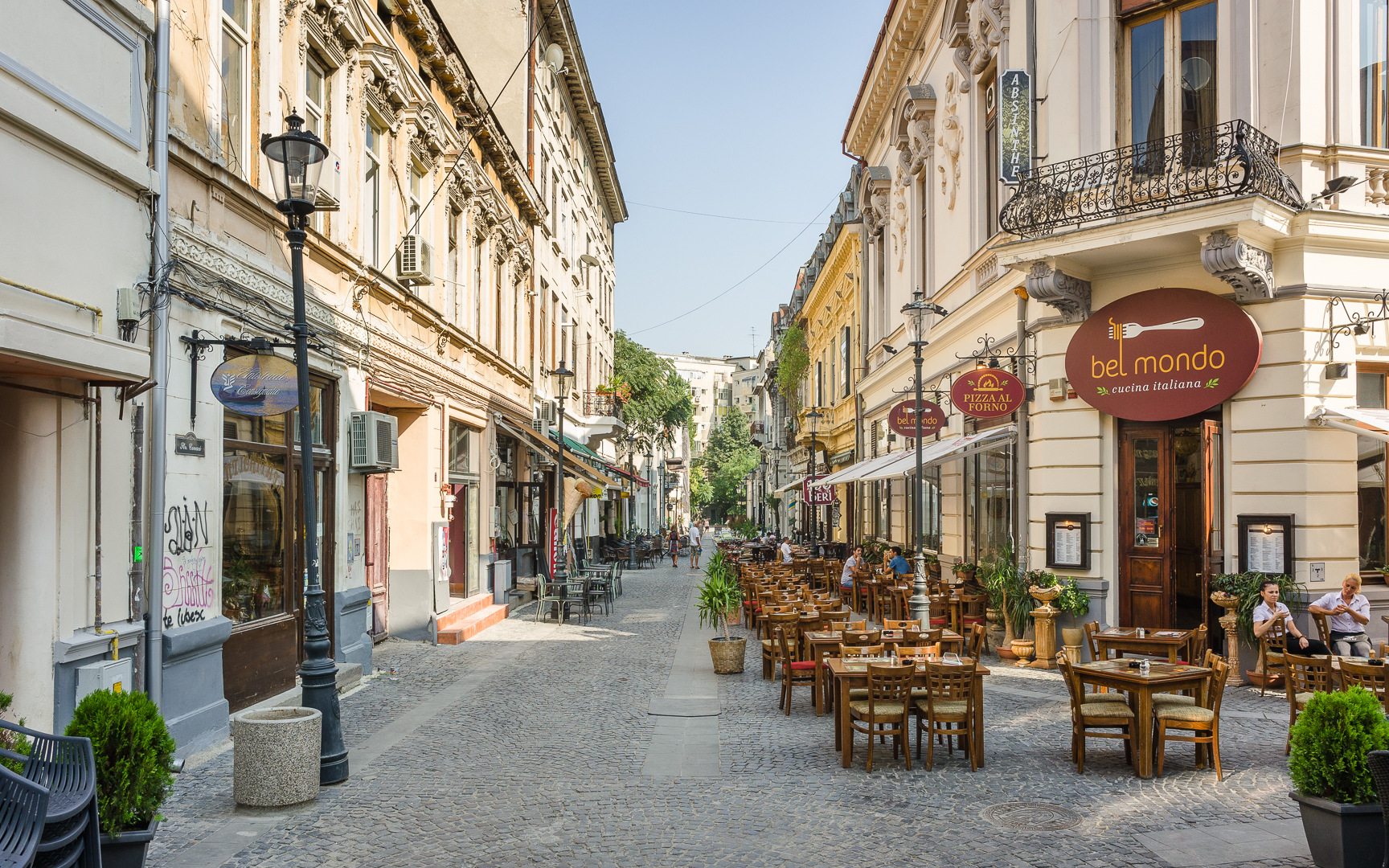
Covaci Street, one of the many streets in the Old Town

The Old Town is located in the center of Bucharest, Romania, and is known for its nightlife.

Ion C. Brătianu Boulevard crosses the historic center from north to south, dividing this area into two approximately equal parts. Also in this perimeter is the beginning of the Calea Moșilor. In addition to the 48 streets, between which are the following streets: Lipscani, Șelari, Covaci, Doamnei, Stavropoleos, Franceză, Șepcari, in the historic center there are also three entrances, three passages and five squares or squares.

== Gallery ==
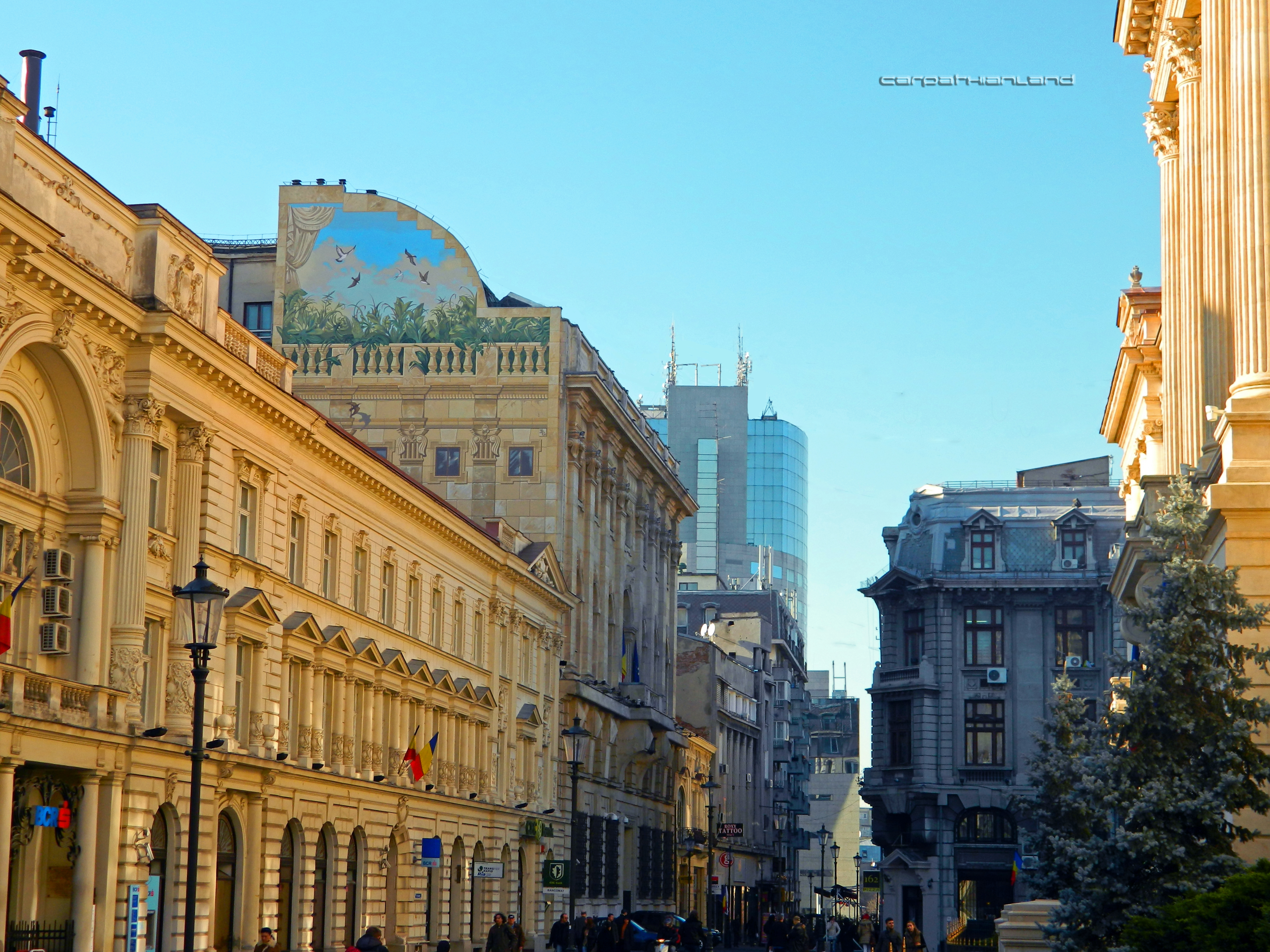

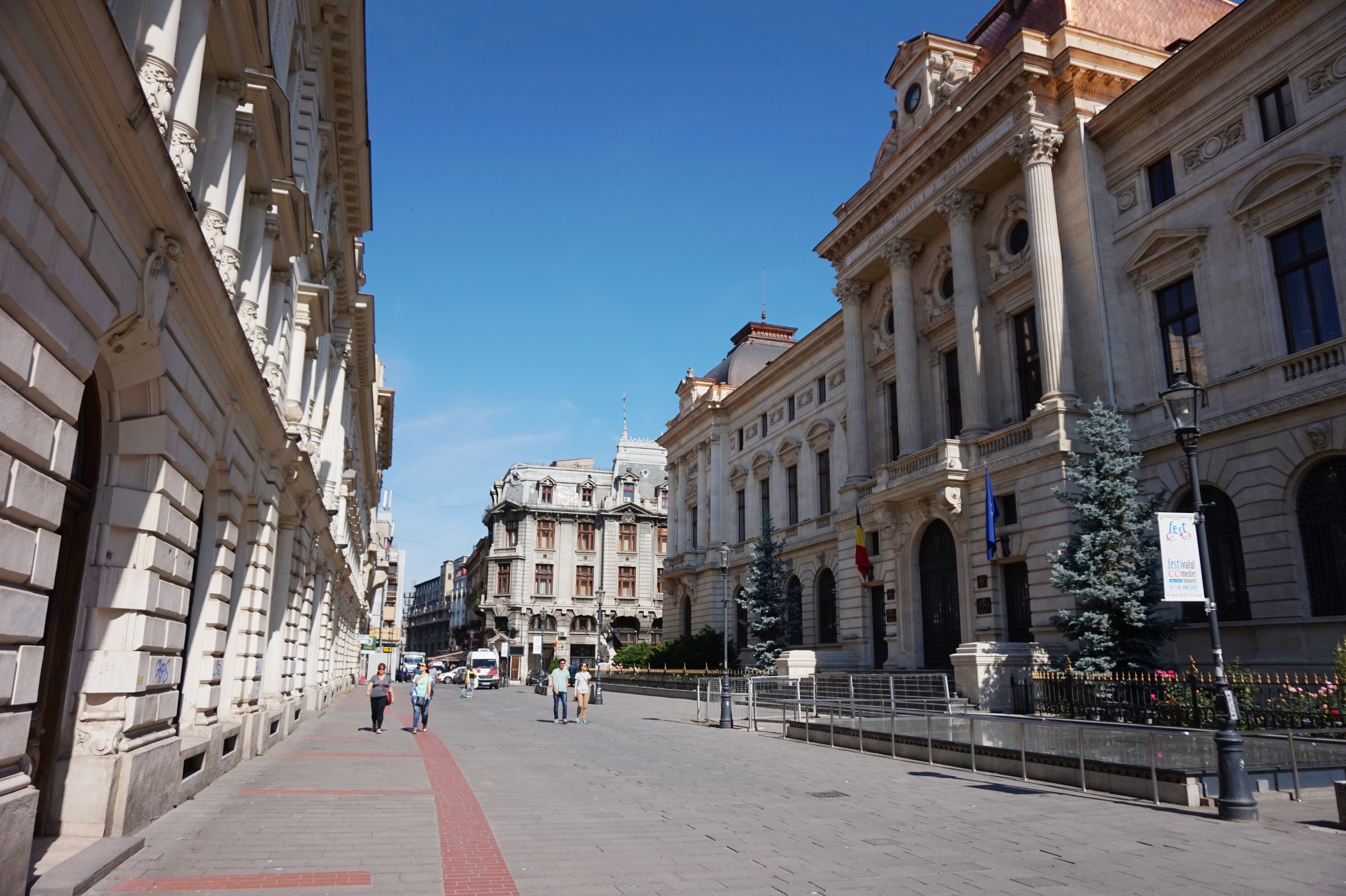

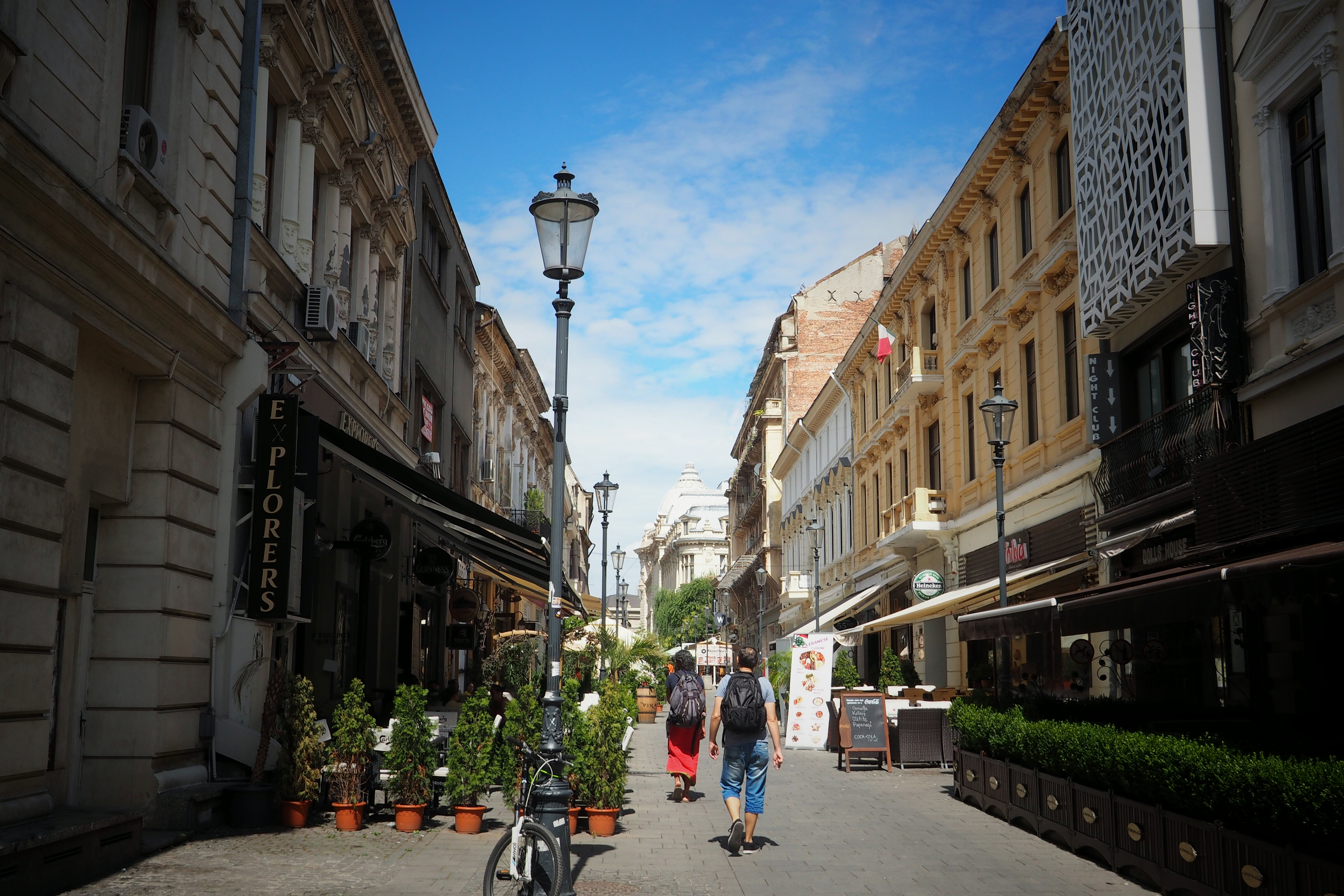

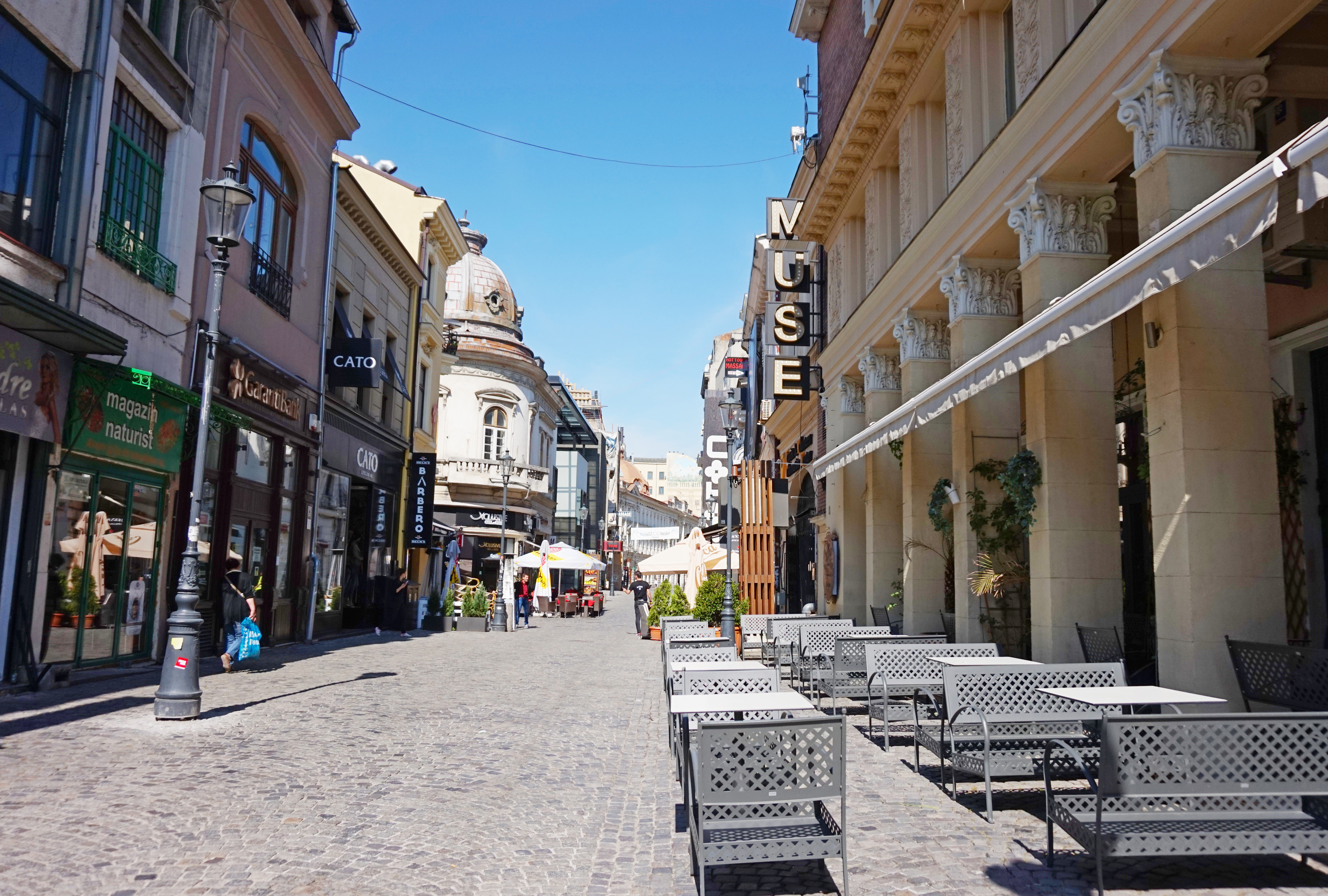

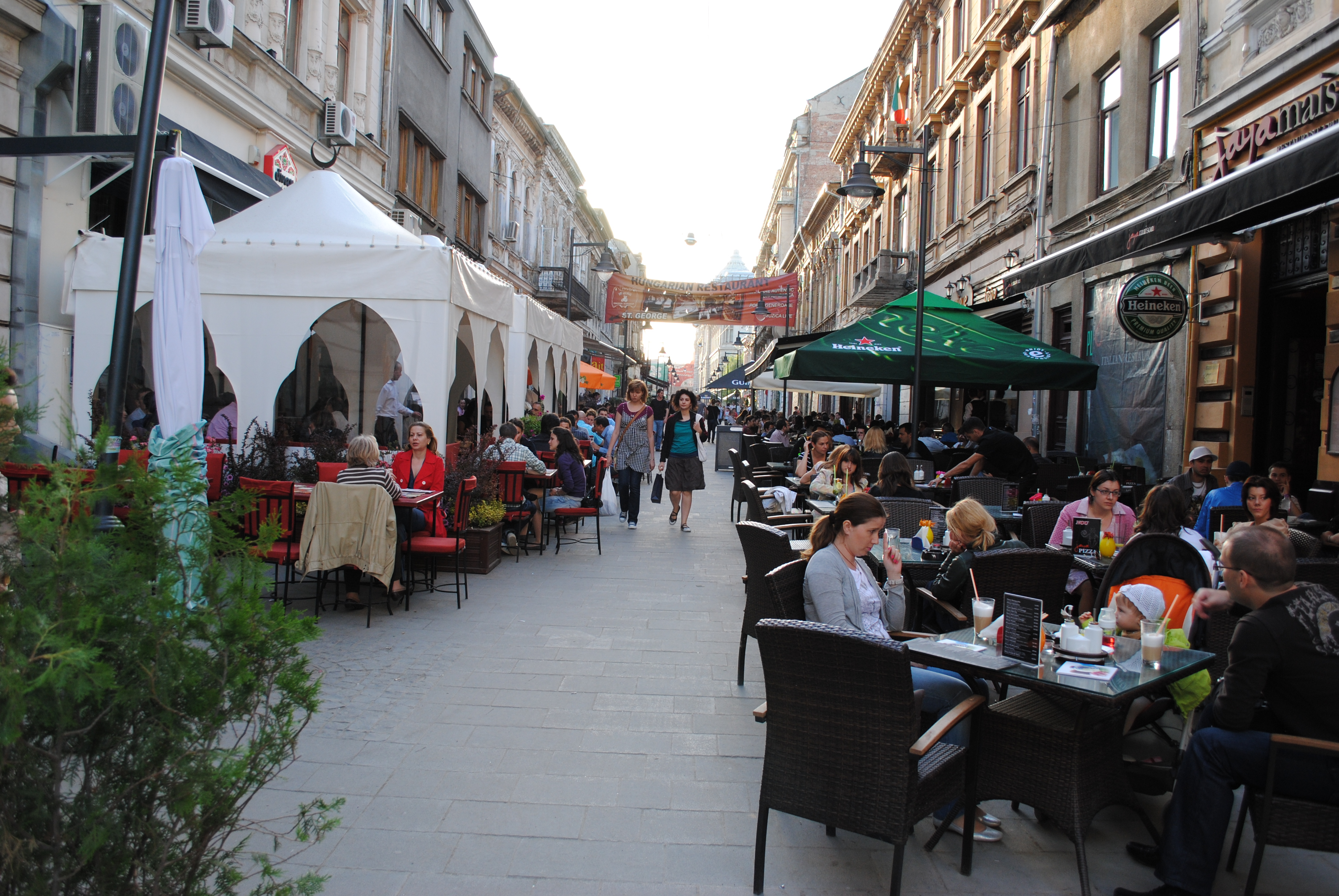

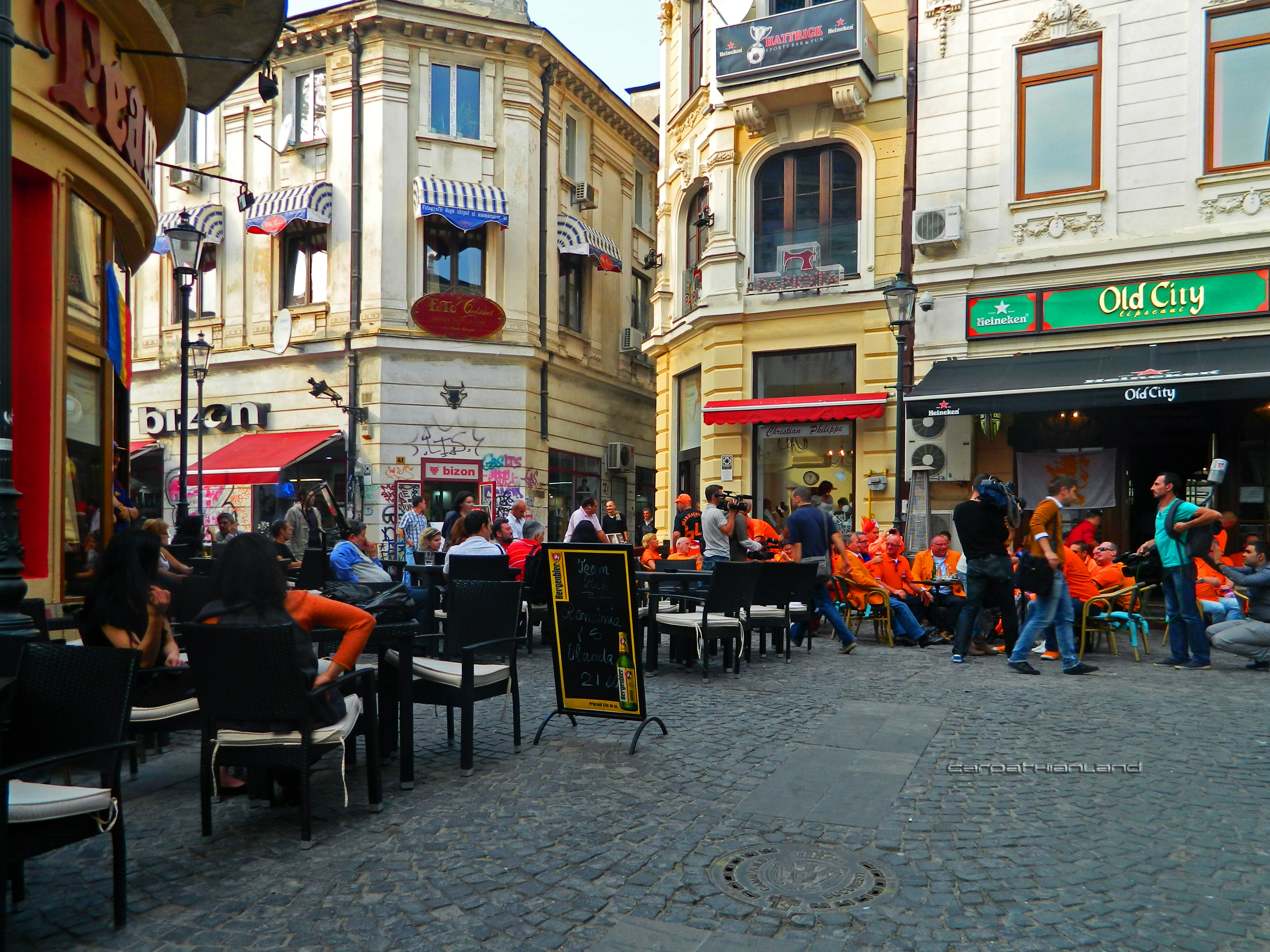

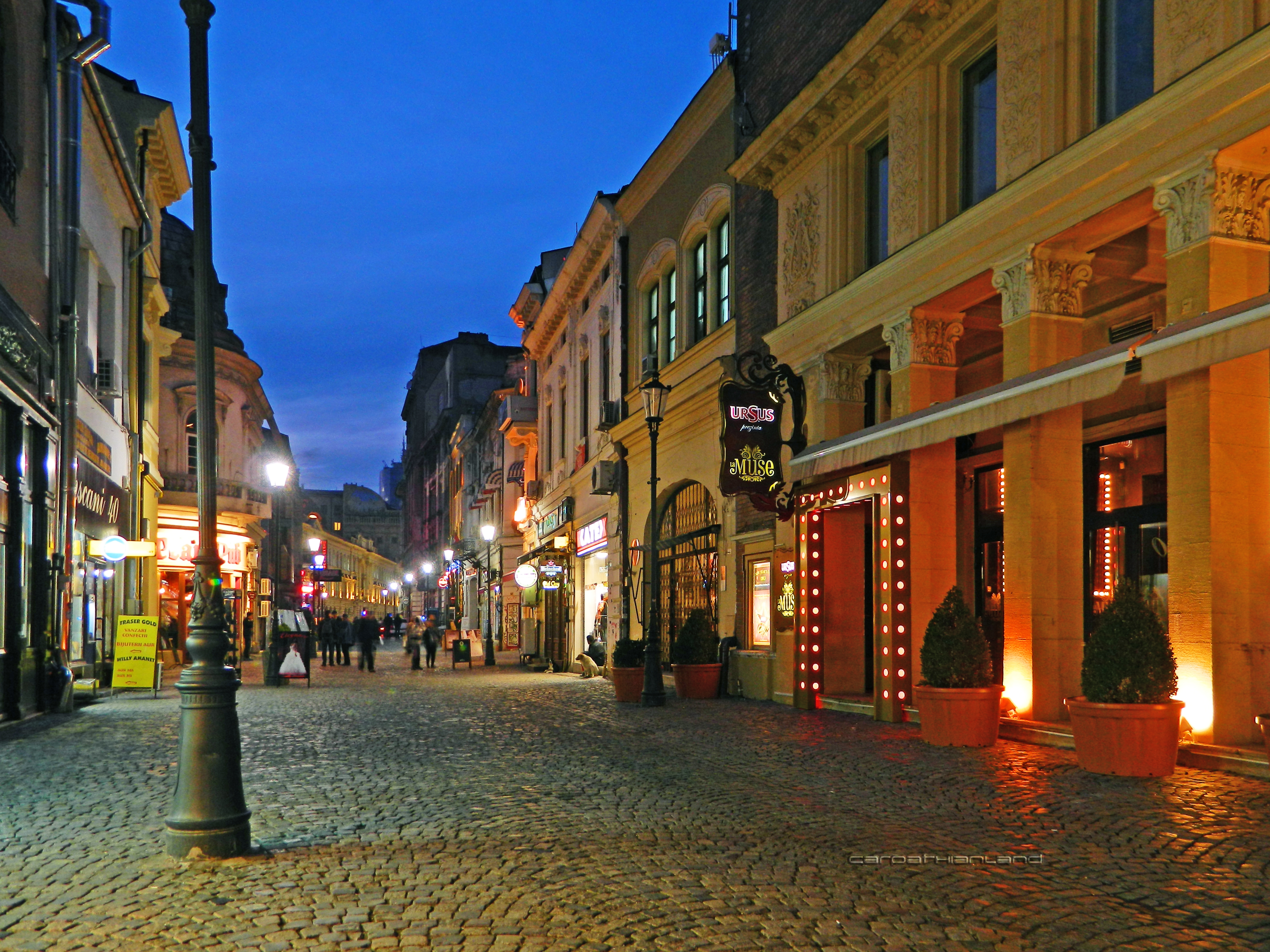

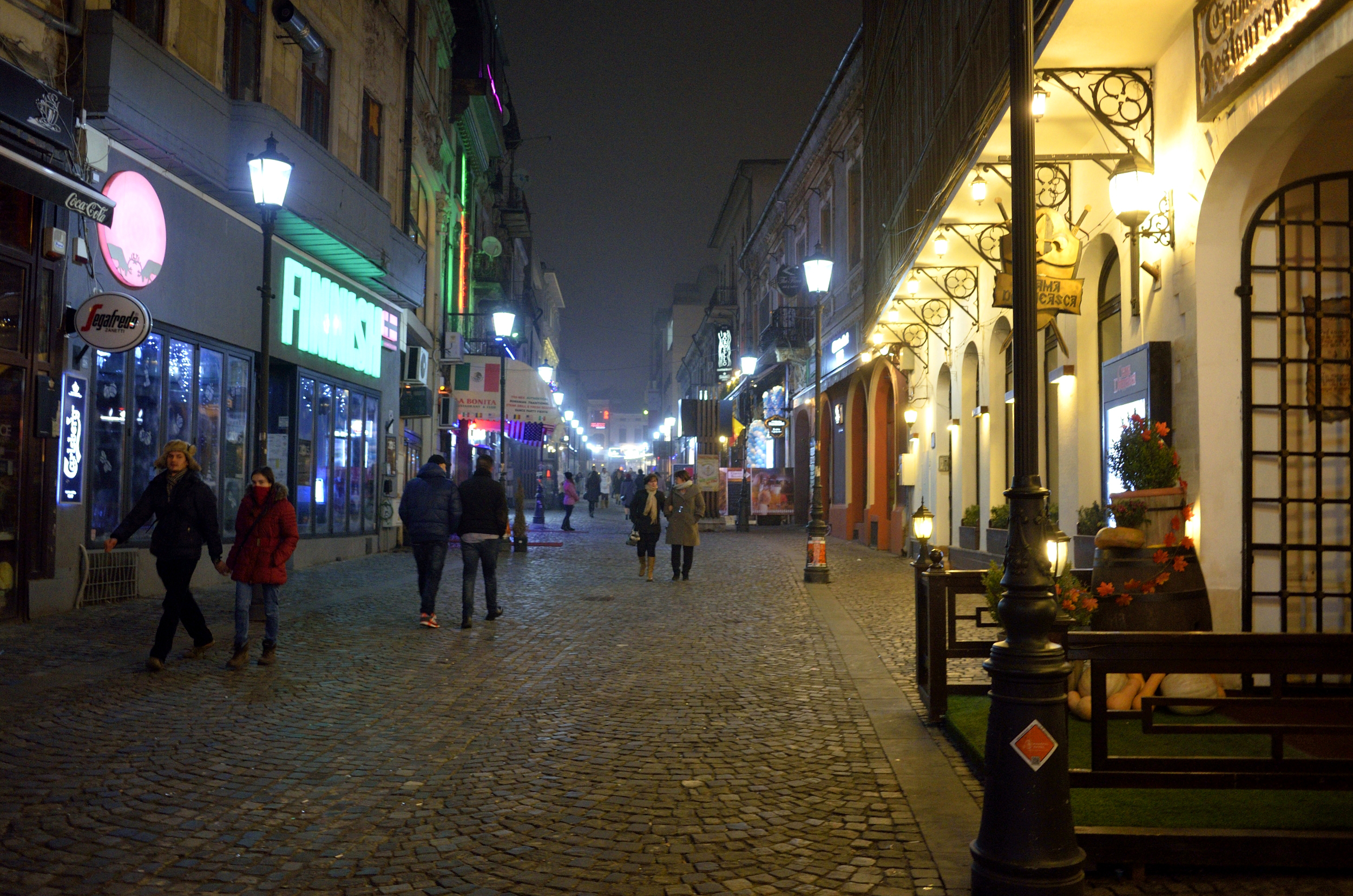

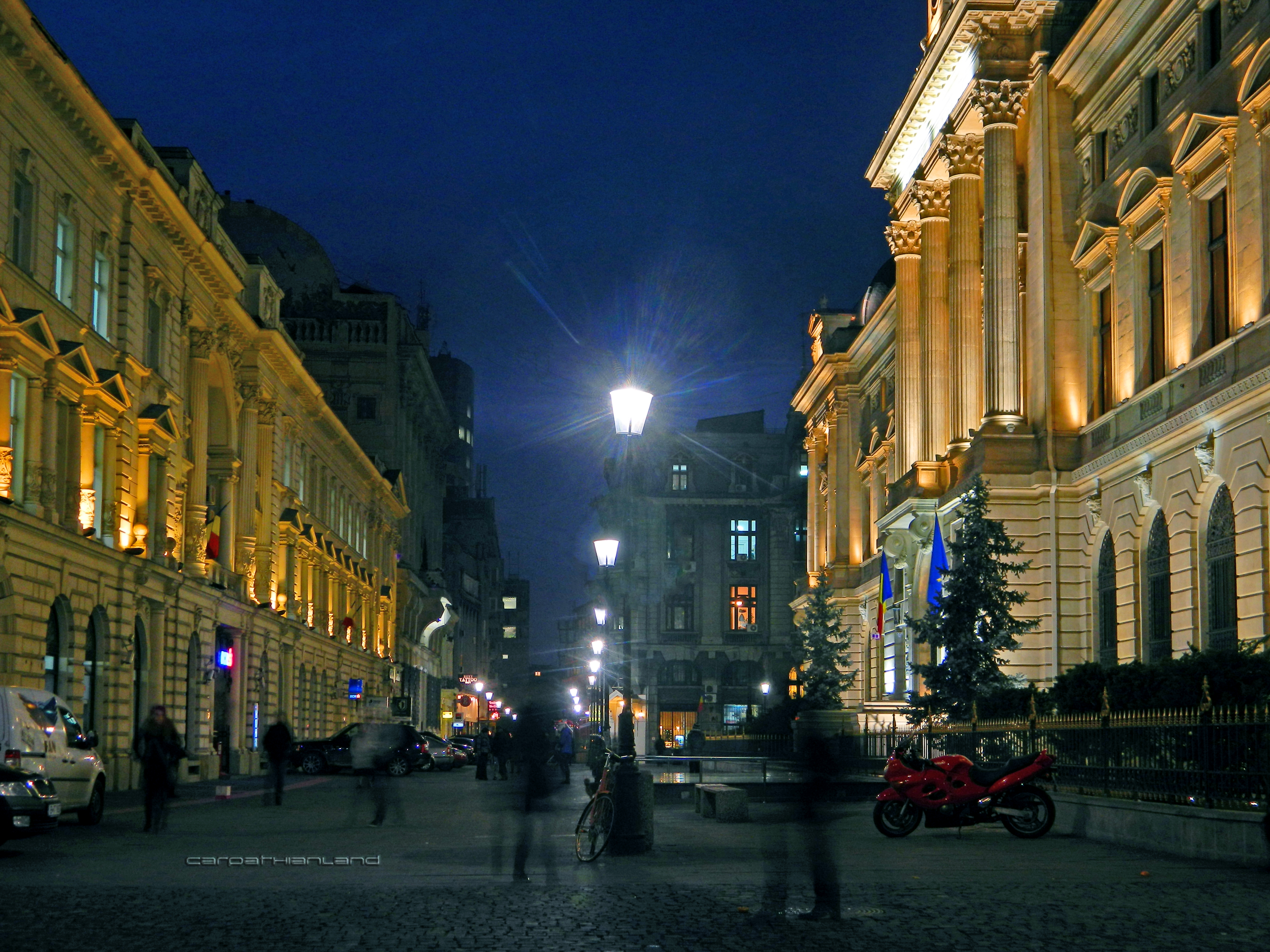

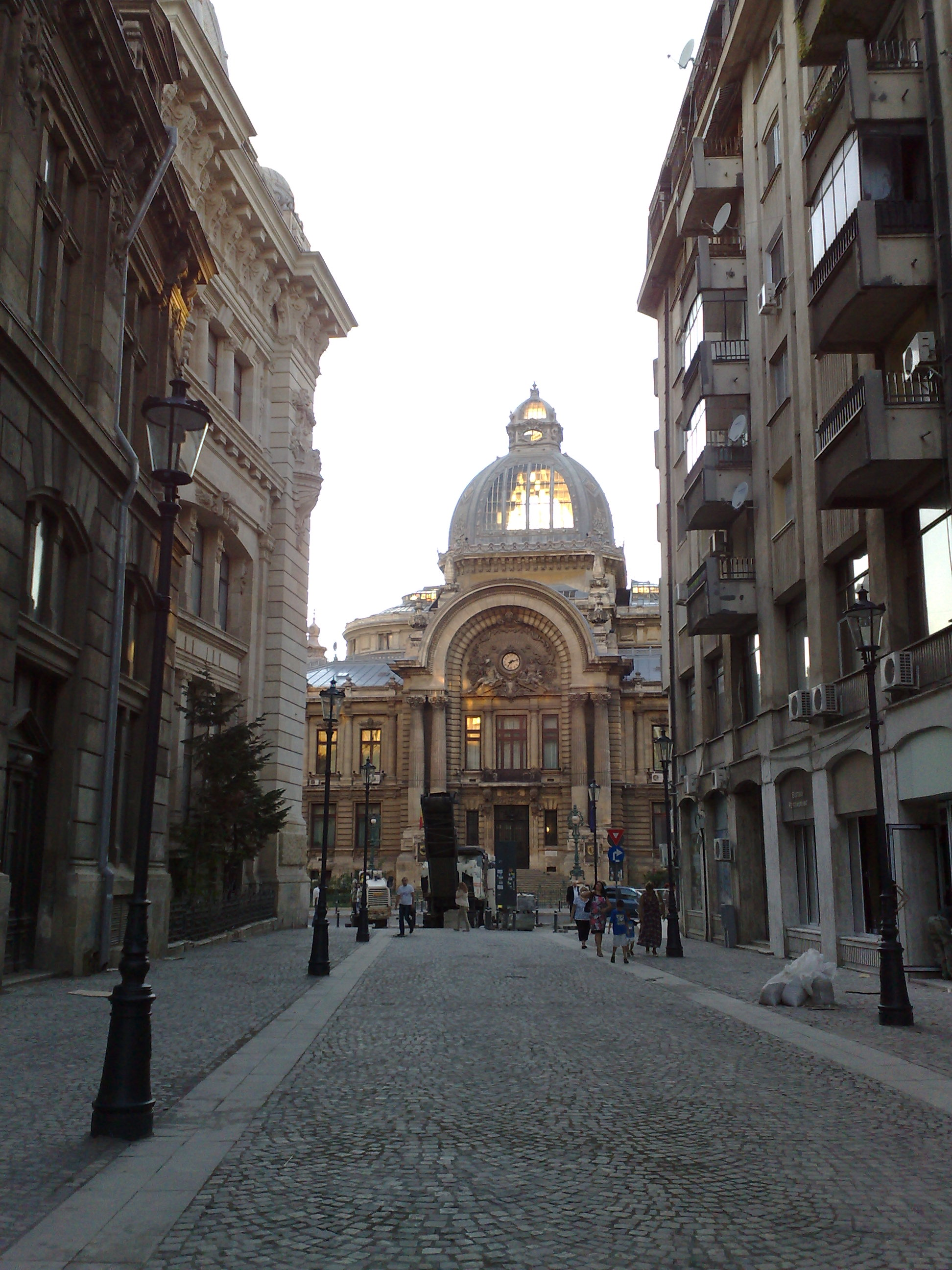

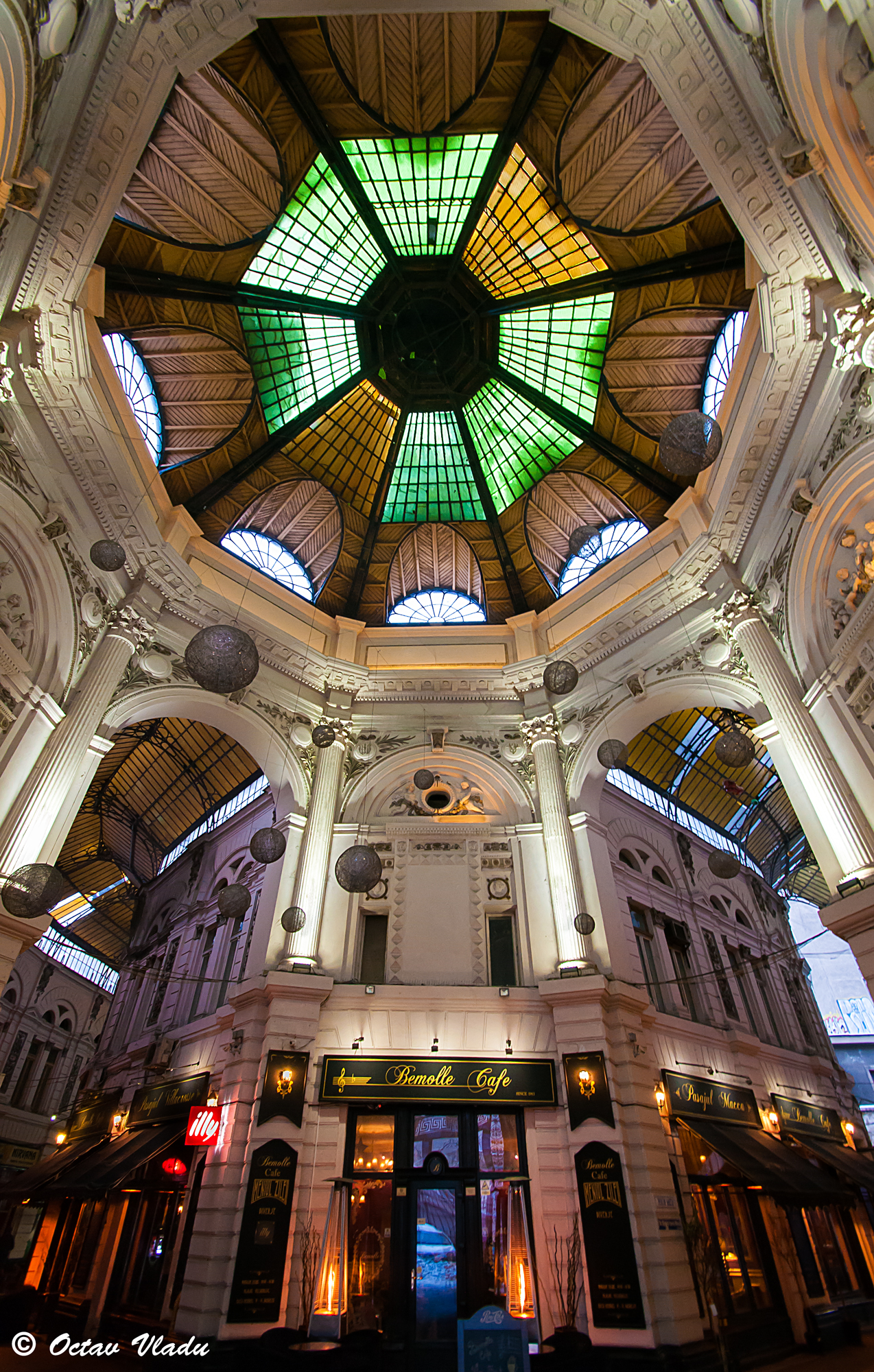

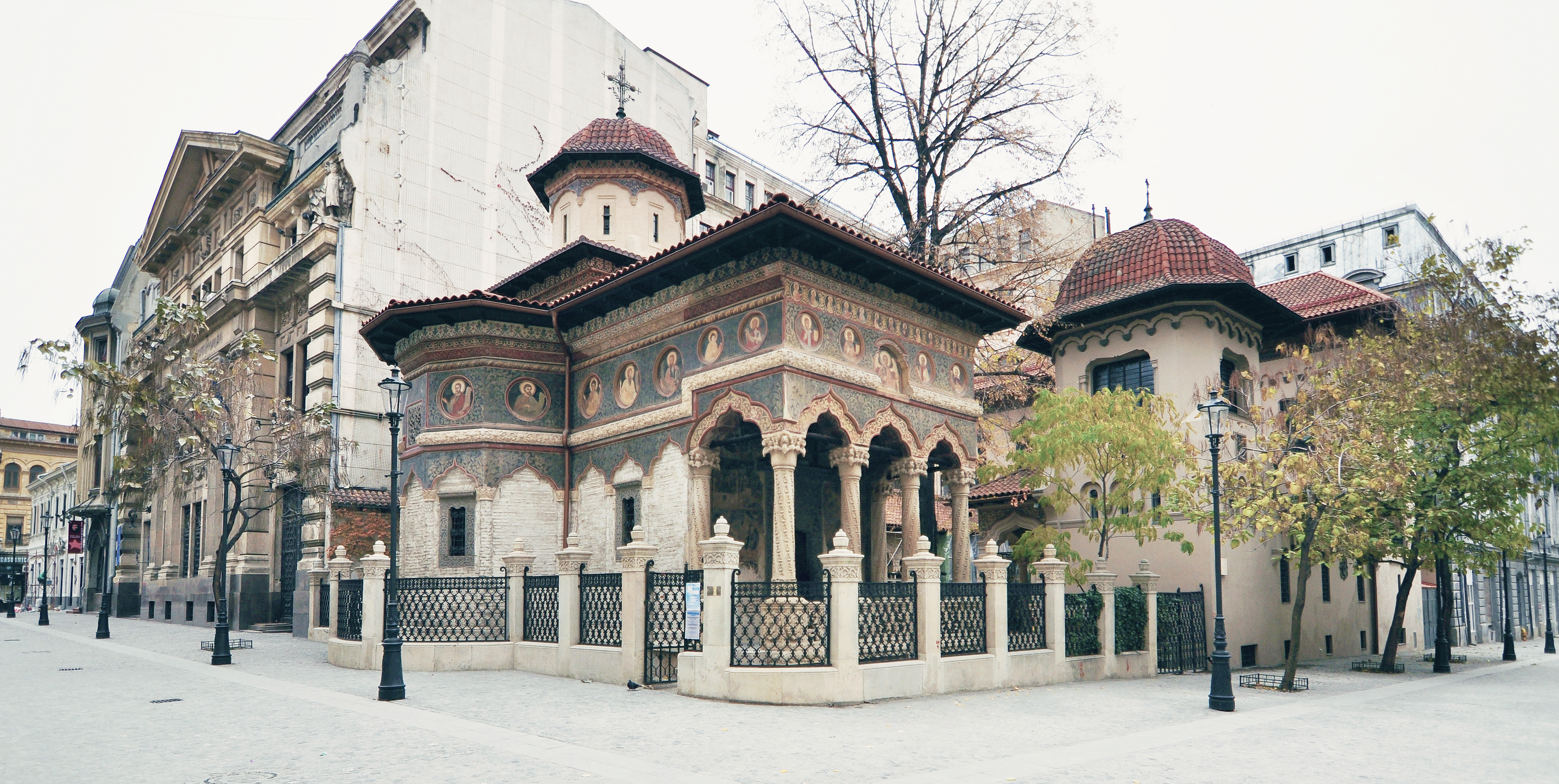

== See also ==
- Curtea Veche
