= HaHaHa Production =

Romanian record label

- Parent company: Milk & Honey Management
- Founded: 2009
- Founder: Smiley
- Genre: Various
- Country of origin: Romania
- Location: Bucharest
- Official website: hahahaproduction.com

HaHaHa Production is a Romanian record label, launched in 2009 by prominent singer Smiley.

As of 2015, HaHaHa Production has also produced and co-produced singles for international artists, such as: In-Grid, Sway, Snoop Dogg, Flo Rida, Mario Winans, Cozi Costi, Junior Caldera and DJ Smash.

HaHaHa Production is composed of:

- HaHaHa Video Production
- HaHaHa Management
- HaHaHouse

HaHaHa Production is one of YouTube's official local partners, along with Roton, Cat Music, MediaPro Music and TVR. The first video uploaded to YouTube's local platform was the video for "Mi-ai intrat în cap" performed by Jazzy Jo feat. Dorian.

== Notable artists ==
- Andra
- Cabron
- Feli
- Smiley
- Alex Velea
