= Cat Music =

Romanian record label

- Parent company: Media Services Group
- Founded: 1991
- Founder: Dan Gheorghe Popi, Sorin Golea
- Distributor: Sony Music Entertainment
- Genre: Various
- Country of origin: Romania
- Location: Bucharest
- Official website: catmusic.ro

Cat Music is a record label based in Bucharest, Romania, that holds 30% of the market share and a catalogue of more than 8,500 songs. Its YouTube channel is the most popular of a Romanian label, with over 7.4 million subscribers and 8.2 billion views.

Dan Gheorghe Popi, CEO of Cat Music, was the president of the Union of Phonogram Producers in Romania and was listed in 2004 in Billboard's Top 20 Best Independent Artist and Repertoire Managers. It was founded in 1991 by Dan Popi and has a market share of 30 percent in Romania. Internationally successful artists of Cat Music were O-Zone (Dragostea din tei), Cleopatra Stratan (Ghiță) and Edward Maya feat. Vika Jigulina (Stereo Love).

In 2019, Cat Music opened its first international branch in Madrid, Spain.

== Artists ==
Current

- 3rei Sud Est
- ADDA
- Adrian Sînă
- Alex Mica
- Andreea Bălan
- Andreea Bănică
- Anna Lesko
- Alex Velea
- Bella Santiago
- Bere Gratis
- Claudia Pavel
- DJ Project
- DJ Sava
- Dony
- Elena Gheorghe
- Ester Peony
- Faydee
- Feli
- Ilinca Băcilă
- Jo
- Kamelia
- Laurențiu Duță
- Lidia Buble
- Mandinga
- Mira
- Pavel Stratan
- Ruby
- Smiley
- UDDI
- Voltaj
- What's UP

Former

- Cleopatra Stratan
- Delia Matache
- Edward Maya
- O-Zone (disbanded)
- Blondy (disbanded)

=== Cat Music Spain artists ===
- Descemer Bueno
- Mirela Cabero
- Jorge González
- Juan Magán

=== Distribution in Romania by other artists ===
- Nyanda
- Markus Schulz
- Mohombi
