= List of Romanian Top 100 number ones =

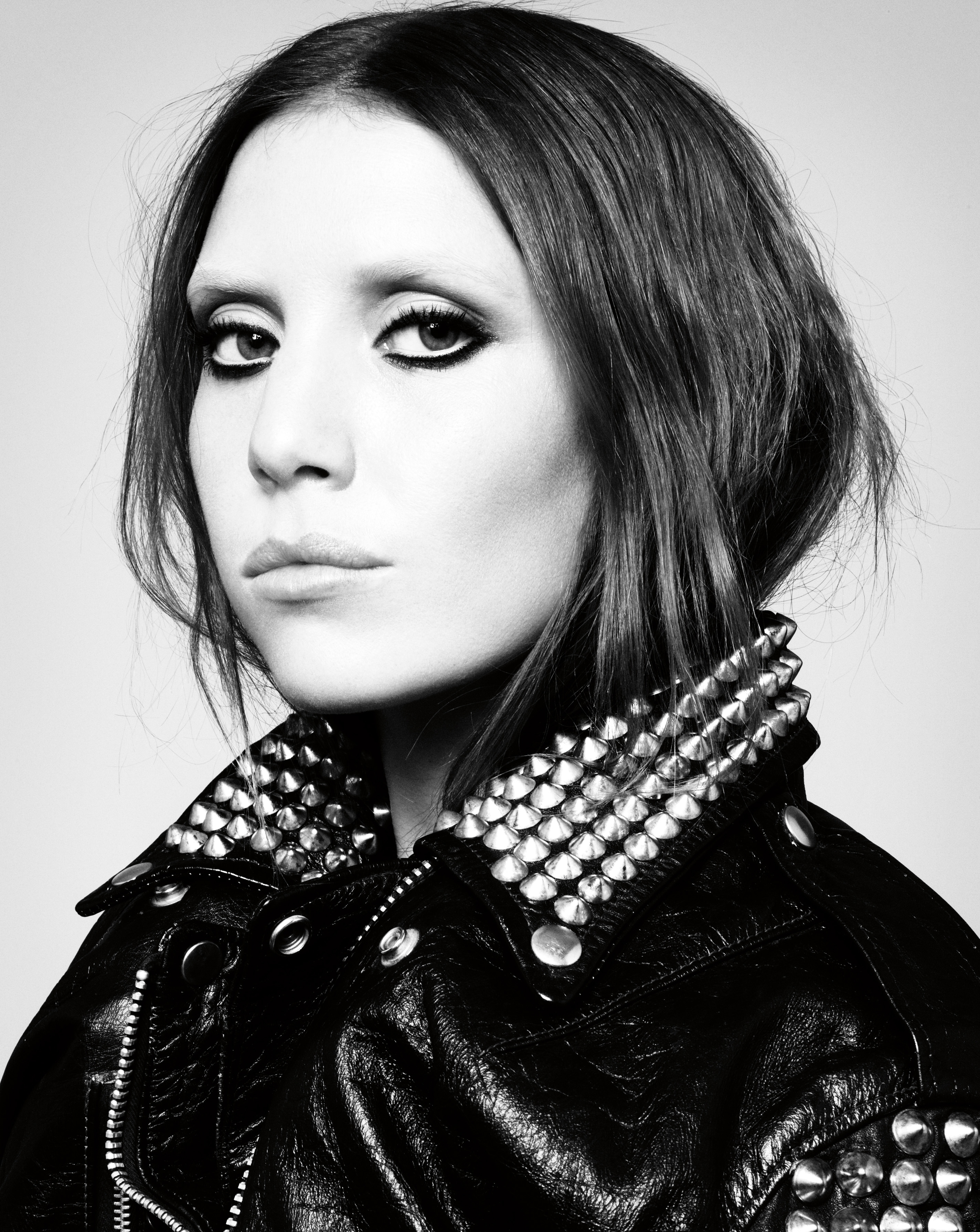
"I Follow Rivers" by Lykke Li (pictured in 2009) topped the Romanian Top 100 for 12 weeks in 2011 and 2012, making it the song with the most documented weeks at number one in the chart's history.

Founded in 1995, the Romanian Top 100 was the national music chart of Romania. It was compiled by broadcast monitoring services Body M Production A-V (1990s and 2000s) and by Media Forest (2010s), and measured the airplay of songs on radio stations throughout the country. In 2005, the number of radio stations involved was 120. Starting in 2004, the chart was announced during a two-hour radio show which initially emerged from a partnership with teen magazine Bravo. The Romanian Top 100 was also featured in Billboard's Music & Media magazine until 2003, and was—apart from a weekly Kiss FM podcast in the 2010s—announced on its own website. As of 2026, the Romanian Top 100 lacks usable archives, especially for the late 1990s and 2000s.

Over its 17 years of existence, around 150 documented singles reached the number-one position, the first being "You Are Not Alone" by Michael Jackson in 1995. "I Follow Rivers" (2011) by Lykke Li spent 12 weeks at the summit, longer than any other song. The most successful artists were Madonna and Kylie Minogue with six documented number ones each. Multiple artists reached number one with several singles in a calendar year, including the Black Eyed Peas with "Where Is the Love?" and "Shut Up" in 2004. Cleopatra Stratan was four years old when she topped the chart in October 2006 with "Ghiță", making her the youngest artist ever to attain a number one in any country according to Guinness World Records. The Romanian Top 100 ceased publication after its last broadcast on 19 February 2012, and was replaced with the Airplay 100.

== Number ones ==
Key
†	Indicates number-one song of the year (Note: Notes concerning Romanian Top 100's year-end charts: In 1999, "Livin' la Vida Loca" by Ricky Martin was listed as the most-played song of the year, however its peak position on the weekly chart is unknown.; It is unknown whether a year-end chart for 2002 was published.; In 2003, "In da Club" by 50 Cent was listed as the most-played song of the year, but failed to reach number one on the weekly chart.; In 2004, "Hoy" by Gloria Estefan was listed as the most-played song of the year, but failed to reach number one on the weekly chart.; In 2008, "Freedom to Love" by Lexter was listed as the most-played song of the year, but it is unknown whether it reached number one on the weekly chart.; In 2010, "In Love" by Deepcentral was listed as the most-played song of the year, but it is unknown whether it reached number one on the weekly chart; The 2008 and 2009 year-end charts used were released by Nielsen Media Control, and the 2010 one by Media Forest. Due to the lack of archives, it is unknown whether those reflect the ones published by the Romanian Top 100.)

=== 1990s ===
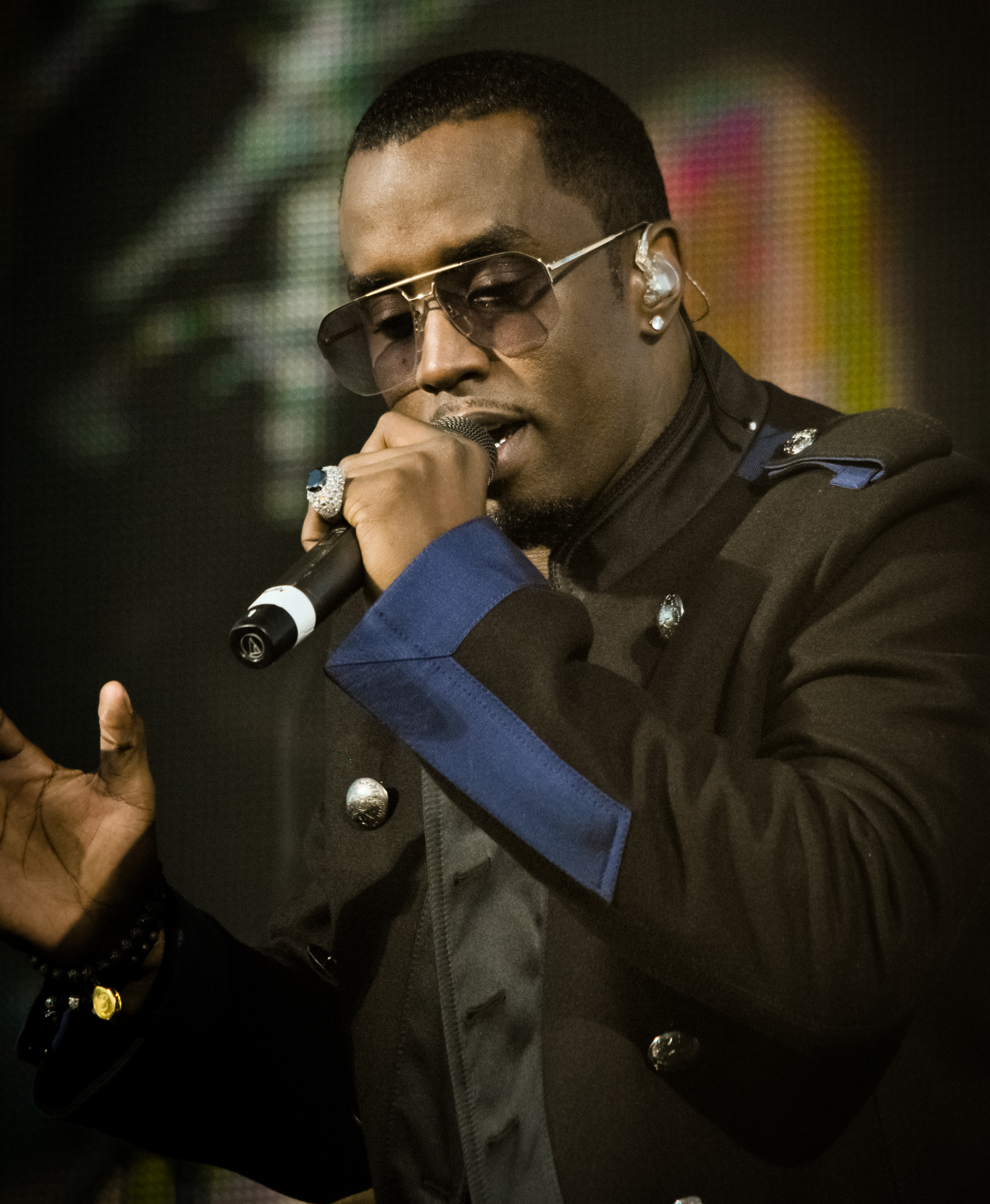
"I'll Be Missing You" by Puff Daddy (pictured in 2010) topped the 1997 Romanian Top 100 year-end chart.

List of number-one songs on the Romanian Top 100 in the 1990s
Artist(s)	Title	Issue date	Ref.
Michael Jackson	"You Are Not Alone"	1995	
Apollo 440	"Ain't Talkin' 'bout Dub"	1997	
Backstreet Boys	"As Long as You Love Me"	1997	
Backstreet Boys	"Everybody (Backstreet's Back)"	1997	
Toni Braxton	"Un-Break My Heart"	1997	
C-Block	"Time Is Tickin' Away"	1997	
Gina G	"Ti Amo"	1997	
Robert Miles	"One and One"	1997	
Nana	"He's Comin'"	1997	
Nana	"Lonely"	1997	
No Doubt	"Don't Speak"	1997	
Puff Daddy	"I'll Be Missing You"†	1997	
Sash! featuring Adrian Rodriguez	"Ecuador"	1997	
Spice Girls	"Spice Up Your Life"	1997	
Barbra Streisand and Celine Dion	"Tell Him"	1997	

=== 2000s ===
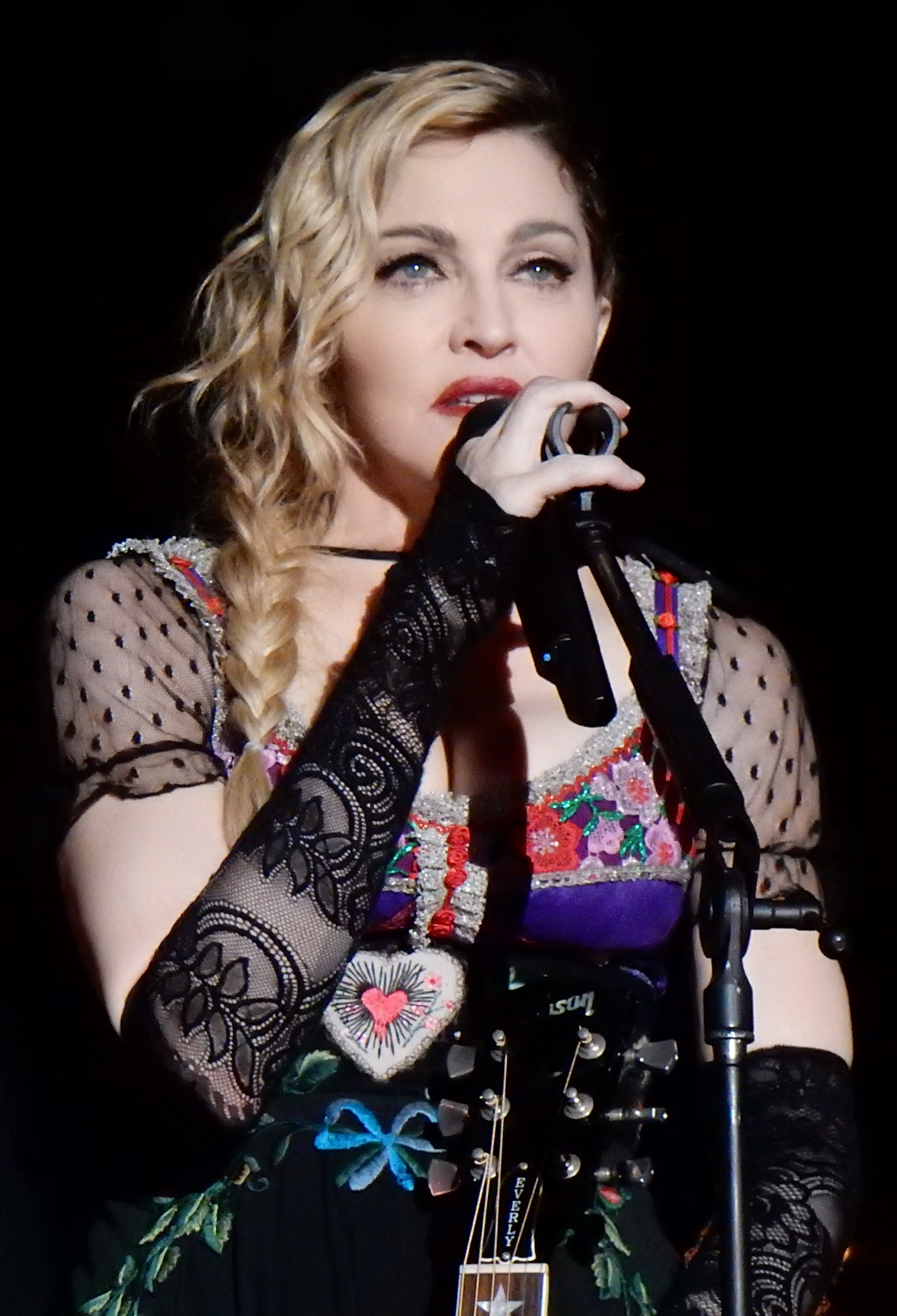
In 2000, Madonna (pictured in 2015) topped the chart for six weeks with "Music"; "American Pie" also reached the summit.

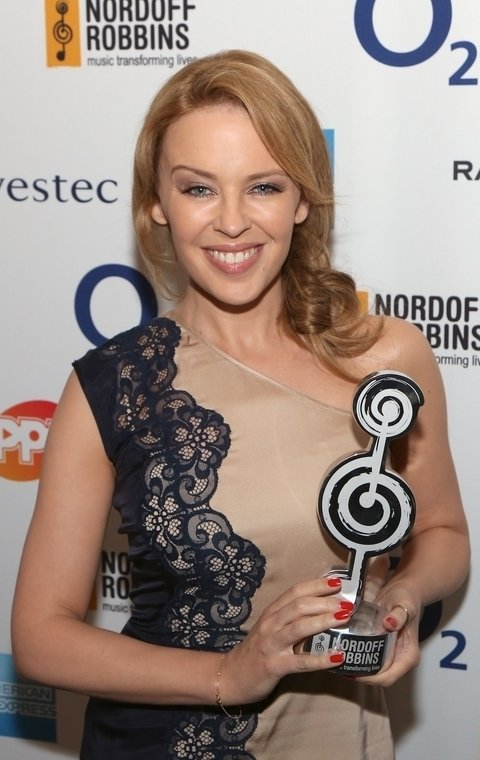
Kylie Minogue's (pictured in 2012) "Can't Get You Out of My Head" was the most-broadcast song in Romania in 2001.

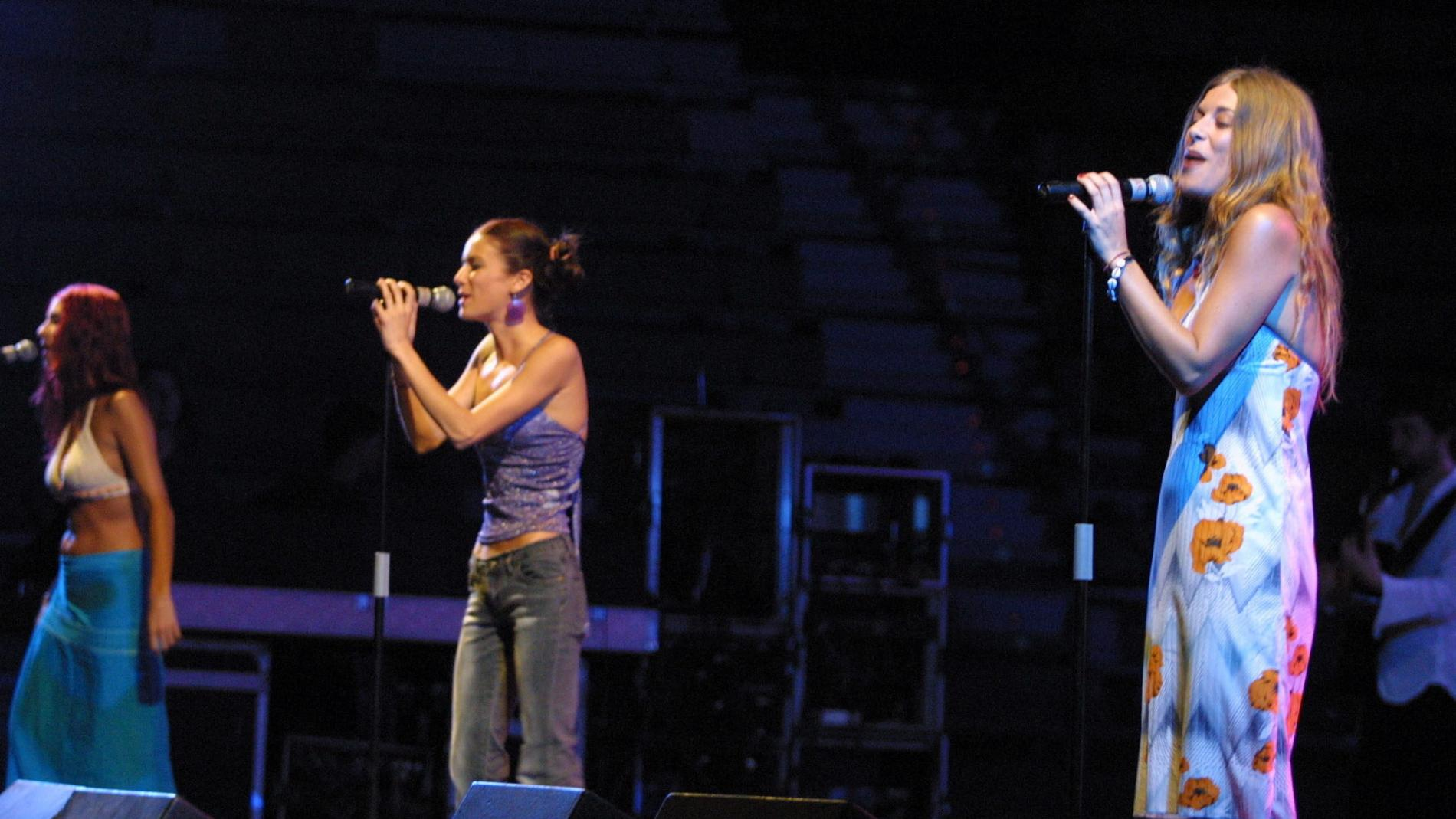
Las Ketchup (pictured in 2003) claimed the summit for nine weeks in 2002 with "The Ketchup Song (Aserejé)".

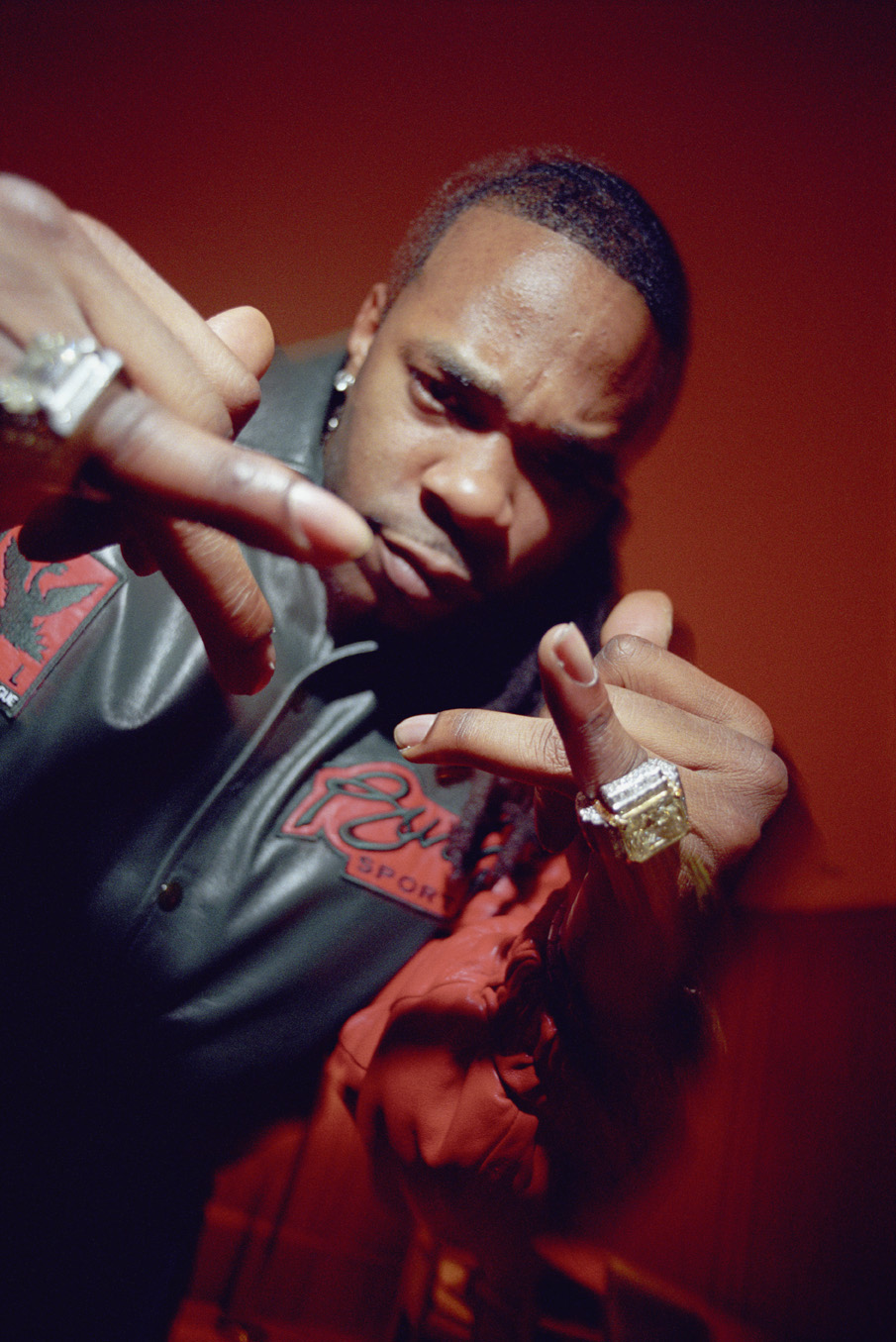
In 2003, "I Know What You Want" by Busta Rhymes and Mariah Carey topped the Romanian Top 100 for five weeks.

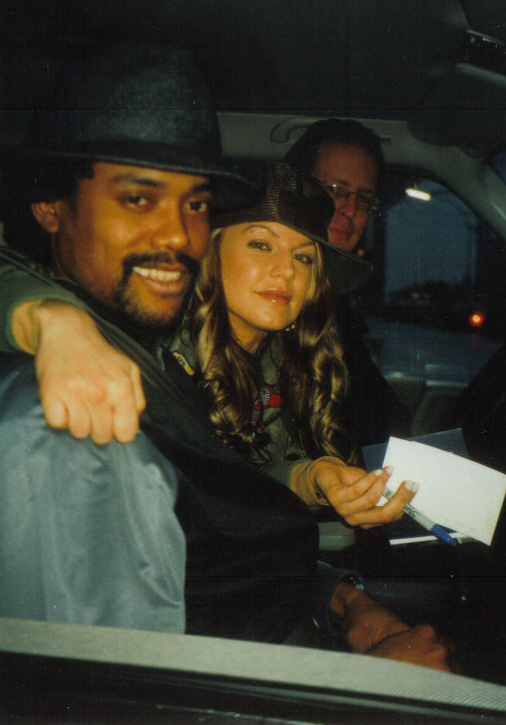
The Black Eyed Peas claimed the number-one position for ten consecutive weeks in 2004 with "Shut Up", and also topped the chart with "Where Is the Love?".

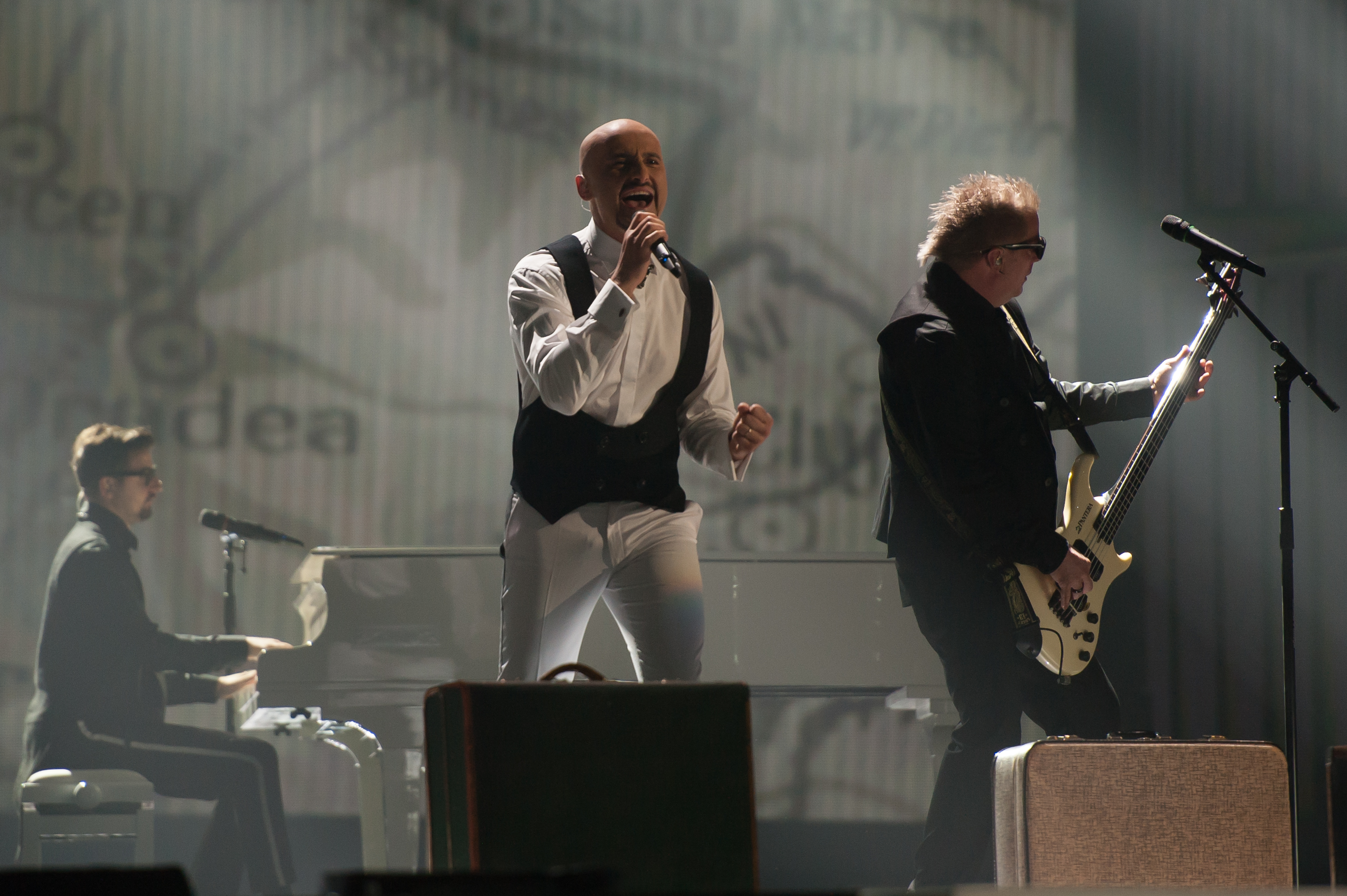
"Povestea oricui" by Voltaj (pictured in 2015) stayed at number one on the Romanian Top 100 for six consecutive weeks in 2005.

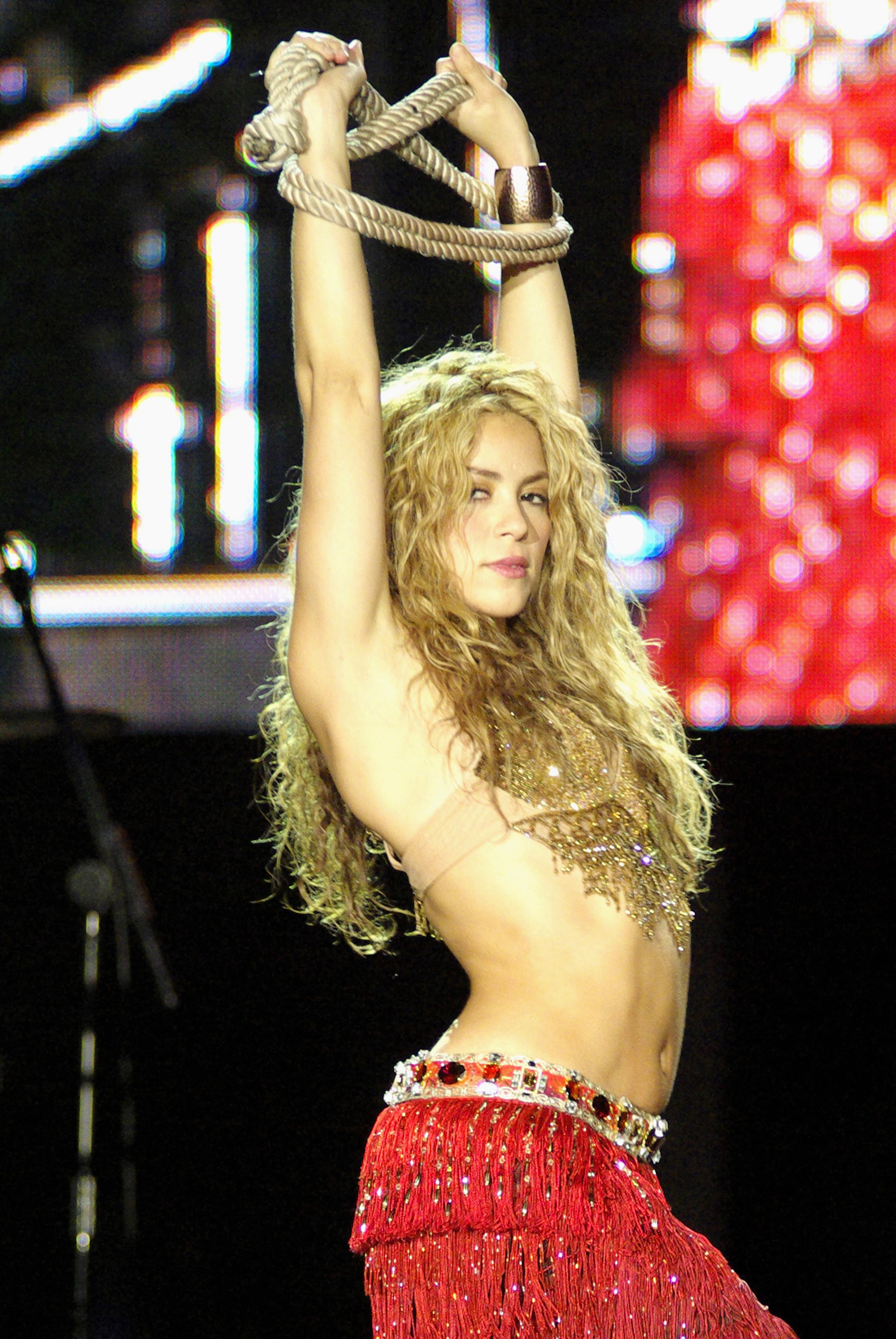
Shakira had the most-played song of 2006 with "Hips Don't Lie" featuring Wyclef Jean.

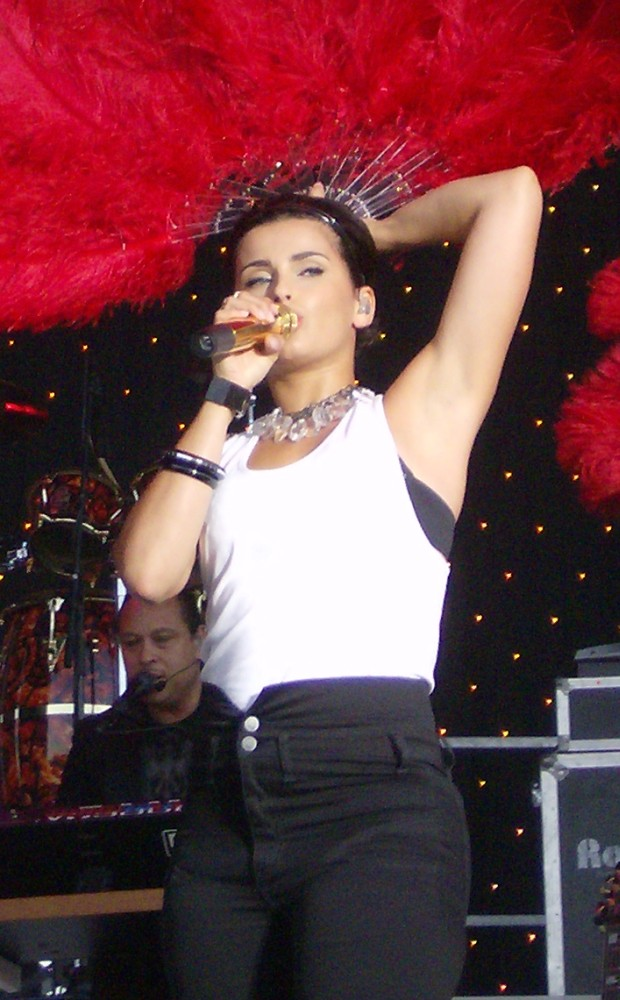
"Say It Right" by Nelly Furtado topped the 2007 year-end chart. On the date it reached number one on the weekly chart, Furtado also occupied the second position with "All Good Things (Come to an End)".

List of number-one songs on the Romanian Top 100 in the 2000s
Artist(s)	Title	Issue date	Wks. (Note: In some cases, data is incomplete and songs may have spent more weeks at number one than shown.)	Ref.
3rei Sud Est	"Amintirile"	2000	1	
3rei Sud Est	"Te aștept să vii"	2000	3	
All Saints	"Pure Shores"	2000	2	
ATB	"The Summer"	2000	2	
A Touch of Class	"Around the World (La La La La La)"	2000	1	
Backstreet Boys	"Show Me the Meaning of Being Lonely"	2000	1	
Bon Jovi	"It's My Life"	2000	3	
Bomfunk MC's	"Freestyler"†	2000	3	
Holograf	"Să nu-mi iei niciodată dragostea"	2000	1	
Whitney Houston	"I Learned from the Best"	2000	2	
Enrique Iglesias	"Rhythm Divine"	2000	1	
Madonna	"American Pie"	2000	1	
Madonna	"Music"	2000	6	
Bob Marley and the Wailers	"Turn Your Lights Down Low"	2000	2	
Modern Talking	"No Face, No Name, No Number"	2000	1	
Modjo	"Lady (Hear Me Tonight)"	2000	2	
Sash!	"Adelante"	2000	2	
Savage Garden	"I Knew I Loved You"	2000	1	
Sonique	"It Feels So Good"	2000	4	
Sonique	"Sky"	2000	2	
Britney Spears	"Oops!... I Did It Again"	2000	2	
Vengaboys	"Shalala Lala"	2000	1	
3rei Sud Est	"Te voi pierde"	2001	6	
Animal X	"Fără tine"	2001	4	
Animal X	"Pentru ea"	2001	5	
Backstreet Boys	"The Call"	2001	1	
Crazy Town	"Butterfly"	2001	2	
Gigi D'Agostino	"L'amour toujours (I'll Fly with You)"	2001	1	
Eminem	"Stan"	2001	2	
Nelly Furtado	"Turn Off the Light"	2001	1	
Dario G	"Dream to Me"	2001	1	
Michael Jackson	"You Rock My World"	2001	1	
Jennifer Lopez	"Love Don't Cost a Thing"	2001	1	
Ricky Martin and Christina Aguilera	"Nobody Wants to Be Lonely"	2001	3	
Kylie Minogue	"Can't Get You Out of My Head"†	2001	4	
N&D	"Nu e vina mea"	2001	2	
LeAnn Rimes	"Can't Fight the Moonlight"	2001	1	
Roger Sanchez	"Another Chance"	2001	1	
Sonique	"I Put a Spell on You"	2001	1	
Britney Spears	"Don't Let Me Be the Last to Know"	2001	2	
Voltaj	"3D"	2001	3	
Voltaj	"20"	2001	1	
Kosheen	"Hide U"	2001	3	
Enrique Iglesias	"Hero"	17 December 2001	4	
Animal X	"Să pot ierta"	28 January 2002	3	
Pink	"Get the Party Started"	18 February 2002	6	
Kylie Minogue	"In Your Eyes"	1 April 2002	3	
Hi-Q	"Tu ești dragostea mea"	22 April 2002	5	
Voltaj	"Tu"	28 May 2002	6	
Simplu	"Oare știi?"	8 July 2002	2	
t.A.T.u.	"Nas Ne Dogonyat"	22 July 2002	7	
Celine Dion	"I'm Alive"	10 September 2002	3	
Las Ketchup	"The Ketchup Song (Aserejé)"	30 September 2002	9	
Madonna	"Die Another Day"	2 December 2002	2	
Shakira	"Objection (Tango)"	16 December 2002	2	
Shania Twain	"I'm Gonna Getcha Good!"	20 January 2003	1	
Robbie Williams	"Feel"	27 January 2003	2	
O-Zone	"Despre tine"	10 February 2003	3	
Robbie Williams	"Feel"	3 March 2003	3	
Enrique Iglesias	"Maybe"	24 March 2003	2	
Las Ketchup	"Kusha Las Payas"	7 April 2003	2	
Christina Aguilera	"Beautiful"	21 April 2003	1	
Los Caños	"Nina Piensa de ti"	28 April 2003	2	
Class	"Luna mi-a zâmbit"	12 May 2003	6	
Hi-Q	"Dor de tine, dor de noi"	23 June 2003	4	
Ricky Martin	"Jaleo"	21 July 2003	1	
Craig David featuring Sting	"Rise & Fall "	28 July 2003	1	
Ricky Martin	"Jaleo"	4 August 2003	1	
Craig David featuring Sting	"Rise & Fall"	11 September 2003	3	
O-Zone	"Dragostea din tei"	1 September 2003	3	
Busta Rhymes featuring Mariah Carey	"I Know What You Want"	29 September 2003	4	
Nicola	"Dincolo de noapte e zi"	27 October 2003	1	
Busta Rhymes featuring Mariah Carey	"I Know What You Want"	3 November 2003	1	
Outlandish	"Aicha"	10 November 2003	3	
Dina Vass	"The Love I Have"	1 December 2003	3	
The Black Eyed Peas	"Where Is the Love?"	5 January 2004	1	
Kylie Minogue	"Slow"	12 January 2004	3	
Blu Cantrell featuring Sean Paul	"Breathe"	2 February 2004	1	
3rei Sud Est	"Clipe"	9 February 2004	1	
The Black Eyed Peas	"Shut Up"	16 February 2004	10	
Class	"Pentru dragoste"	26 April 2004	2	
Kylie Minogue	"Red Blooded Woman"	10 May 2004	2	
Schiller and Heppner	"Leben… I Feel You"	17 May 2004	1	
Kylie Minogue	"Red Blooded Woman"	28 May 2004	1	
Schiller and Heppner	"Leben... I Feel You"	31 May 2004	2	
Nino D'Angelo	"Senza Giaca e Cravata"	14 June 2004	4	
Activ	"Doar cu tine"	12 July 2004	9	
Kelis	"Trick Me"	13 September 2004	6	
Voltaj	"Și ce?"	25 October 2004	8	
Activ	"Visez"	10 January 2005	8	
Kylie Minogue	"I Believe in You"	7 March 2005	5	
Uniting Nations	"Out of Touch"†	11 April 2005	3	
Voltaj	"Povestea oricui"	2 May 2005	6	
Morandi	"Beijo Uh La La"	20 June 2005	9	
DJ Project	"Privirea ta"	22 August 2005	1	
Shakira featuring Alejandro Sanz	"La Tortura"	29 August 2005	2	
Shakira featuring Alejandro Sanz	"La Tortura"	26 September 2005	2	
Fly Project	"Raisa"	10 October 2005	1	
The Pussycat Dolls	"Don't Cha"	17 October 2005	1	
Fly Project	"Raisa"	31 October 2005	2	
The Pussycat Dolls	"Don't Cha"	14 November 2005	1	
The Pussycat Dolls	"Don't Cha"	5 December 2005	1	
Madonna	"Hung Up"	12 December 2005	7	
Akcent	"Jokero"	27 March 2006	3	
Madonna	"Sorry"	17 April 2006	2	
Madonna	"Sorry"	8 May 2006	1	
Morandi	"Falling Asleep"	15 May 2006	1	
Shakira featuring Wyclef Jean	"Hips Don't Lie"†	5 June 2006	1	
Morandi	"Falling Asleep"	12 June 2006	1	
Shakira featuring Wyclef Jean	"Hips Don't Lie"†	19 June 2006	5	
Simplu	"Oficial îmi merge bine"	14 August 2006	1	
Bob Sinclar	"World, Hold On (Children of the Sky)"	21 August 2006	2	
DJ Project	"Încă o noapte"	28 August 2006	1	
Bob Sinclar	"World, Hold On (Children of the Sky)"	11 September 2006	2	
DJ Project	"Încă o noapte"	2 October 2006	1	
Morandi	"A la lujeba"	9 October 2006	1	
Cleopatra Stratan	"Ghiță"	16 October 2006	2	
Cleopatra Stratan	"Ghiță"	13 November 2006	1	
Reamonn	"Tonight"	20 November 2006	6	
Shakira featuring Carlos Santana	"Illegal"	22 January 2007	3	
Akon featuring Eminem	"Smack That"	12 February 2007	1	
Shakira featuring Carlos Santana	"Illegal"	19 February 2007	1	
Akon featuring Eminem	"Smack That"	26 February 2007	1	
Shakira featuring Carlos Santana	"Illegal"	5 March 2007	1	
The Pussycat Dolls featuring Timbaland	"Wait a Minute"	12 March 2007	1	
Nelly Furtado	"Say It Right"†	19 March 2007	6	
Justin Timberlake	"What Goes Around...Comes Around"	28 May 2007	1	
Nelly Furtado	"Say It Right"†	4 June 2007	1	
Akon	"Don't Matter"	18 June 2007	3	
Enrique Iglesias	"Do You Know? (The Ping Pong Song)"	6 August 2007	3	
Fergie	"Big Girls Don't Cry"	10 September 2007	5	
Mika	"Relax, Take It Easy"	15 October 2007	1	
Fergie	"Big Girls Don't Cry"	22 October 2007	2	
Yves Larock	"Rise Up"	5 November 2007	2	
Mika	"Relax, Take It Easy"	19 November 2007	1	
Yves Larock	"Rise Up"	26 November 2007	1	
Enrique Iglesias	"Tired of Being Sorry"	3 December 2007	1	
Yves Larock	"Rise Up"	10 December 2007	1	
Crazy Loop	"Mm-ma-ma"	17 December 2007	2	
Crazy Loop	"Mm-ma-ma"	7 January 2008	5	
Morandi	"Angels (Love Is the Answer)"	11 February 2008	1	
Crazy Loop	"Mm-ma-ma"	18 February 2008	3	
Morandi	"Angels (Love Is the Answer)"	10 March 2008	3	
3rei Sud Est	"Vorbe care dor"	31 March 2008	3	
Celia	"Șoapte"	21 April 2008	1	
Kylie Minogue	"In My Arms"	28 April 2008	1	
Tom Boxer featuring Anca Parghel and Fly Project	"Brasil"	5 May 2008	3	
Madonna featuring Justin Timberlake and Timbaland	"4 Minutes"	26 May 2008	1	
Kylie Minogue	"In My Arms"	2 June 2008	1	
Madonna featuring Justin Timberlake and Timbaland	"4 Minutes"	9 June 2008	2	
David Deejay featuring Dony	"So Bizzare"	17 August 2009	2	
David Guetta featuring Kelly Rowland	"When Love Takes Over"	13 September 2009	1	

=== 2010s ===
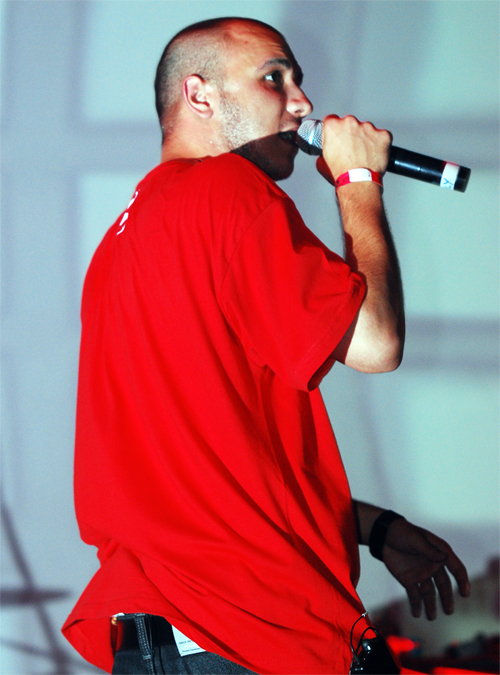
"Tot mai sus" by Guess Who (pictured in 2009) and deMoga topped the 2011 year-end chart.

List of number-one songs on the Romanian Top 100 in the 2010s
Artist(s)	Title	Issue date	Wks.	Ref.
Yolanda Be Cool	"We No Speak Americano"	3 August 2010	1	
Lady Gaga	"Alejandro"	7 August 2010	1	
DJ Sava featuring Raluka	"I Like (The Trumpet)"	11 September 2010	2	
Elena Gheorghe	"Disco Romancing"	3 October 2010	2	
Smiley featuring Pacha Man	"Love Is for Free"	14 November 2010	4	
Alexandra Stan	"Mr. Saxobeat"	12 December 2010	3 (Note: Although only three weeks atop the chart are available for "Mr. Saxobeat", Jason Birchmeier claims in Alexandra Stan's AllMusic biography that the song had spent eight consecutive weeks at number one on the Romanian Top 100.)	
Shakira featuring Dizzee Rascal	"Loca"	8 April 2011	1	
Jennifer Lopez featuring Pitbull	"On the Floor"	April 2011	8	
Play & Win	"Ya BB"	5 June 2011	6	
DJ Project featuring Giulia	"Mi-e dor de noi"	17 July 2011	1	
Jeremih featuring 50 Cent	"Down on Me"	24 July 2011	1	
Guess Who featuring deMoga	"Tot mai sus"†	7 August 2011	6	
Smiley	"Dream Girl"	18 September 2011	4	
DJ Antoine vs Timati featuring Kalenna	"Welcome to St. Tropez"	16 October 2011	2	
Pitbull featuring Marc Anthony	"Rain Over Me"	30 October 2011	2	
Lykke Li	"I Follow Rivers"	13 November 2011	12	
Michel Teló	"Ai Se Eu Te Pego"	19 February 2012	1	

=== Related number ones ===
The Romanian Top 100 significantly lacks chart archives for the late 2000s. At that time, Nielsen Music Control and Uniunea Producătorilor de Fonograme din România (UPFR) began publishing charts which reflected the most-broadcast songs on radio stations and television channels throughout Romania (see list of number ones below); they also gained coverage in local media. However, it is unknown whether the two were affiliated with the Romanian Top 100, and whether their rankings can be used to substitute the lacking Romanian Top 100 archives. The same applies to Media Forest, who began publishing similar radio and television airplay charts starting with July 2009. Media Forest would eventually handle compilation for the Romanian Top 100 beginning with 2011 at the latest.

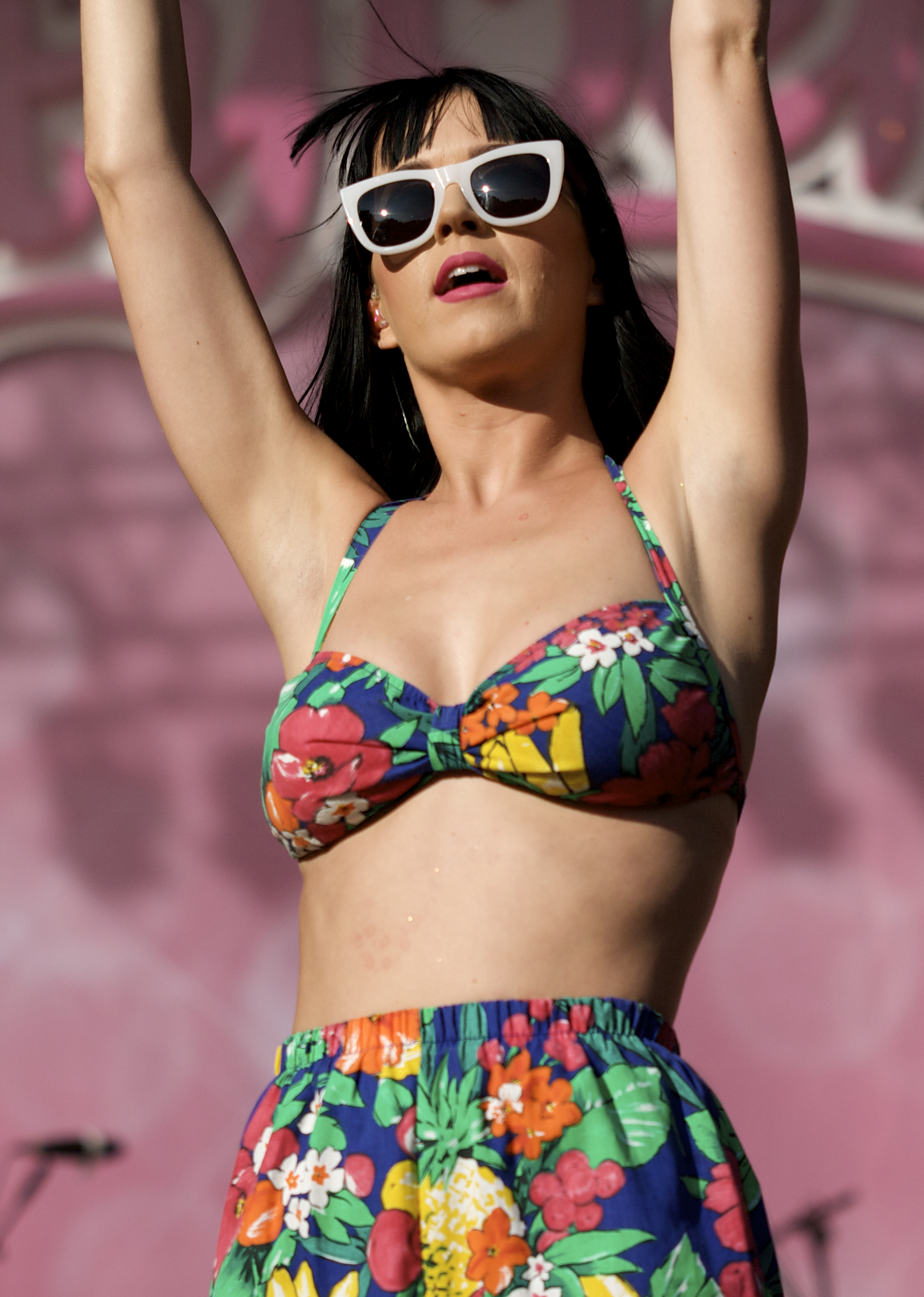
"Hot n Cold" by Katy Perry was the most-broadcast song in the country in 2009.

List of number-one songs on the Nielsen Music Control and UPFR chart
Artist(s)	Title	Issue date	Wks.	Ref.
Morandi featuring Helene	"Save Me"	20 October 2008	1	
Akcent	"Stay with Me"	24 November 2008	1 (Note: Although only one week atop the chart is available for "Stay with Me", an author on Roton's website claims that the song had spent three consecutive weeks at number one on the chart.)	
Inna	"Hot"	8 December 2008	1	
Katy Perry	"Hot n Cold"†	5 January 2009	6	
The Pussycat Dolls	"I Hate This Part"	16 February 2009	1	
Katy Perry	"Hot n Cold"†	2 March 2009	2	
The Pussycat Dolls	"I Hate This Part"	16 March 2009	2	
Lady Gaga	"Poker Face"	30 March 2009	1	
Elena Gheorghe	"The Balkan Girls"	6 April 2009	2	
Oceana	"Cry Cry"	20 April 2009	3	
Puya featuring George Hora	"Undeva-n Balkani"	25 May 2009	1	
Oceana	"Cry Cry"	8 June 2009	3	
David Deejay featuring Dony	"So Bizzare"	6 July 2009	1	
Puya featuring George Hora	"Undeva-n Balkani"	13 July 2009	1	
Neylini	"Muleina (DJ Andi Remix)"	20 July 2009	1	
David Deejay featuring Dony	"So Bizzare"	27 July 2009	4	
Neylini	"Muleina (DJ Andi Remix)"	24 August 2009	1	
Neylini	"Muleina (DJ Andi Remix)"	7 September 2009	1	
Pitbull	"I Know You Want Me (Calle Ocho)"	14 September 2009	1	
Pitbull	"I Know You Want Me (Calle Ocho)"	5 October 2009	1	
Inna	"Amazing"	12 October 2009	1 (Note: Although only one week atop the chart is available for "Amazing", an author for Musichat claims that the song had spent three weeks at number one on the chart.)	
The Black Eyed Peas	"I Gotta Feeling"	4 January 2010	1	
Lady Gaga	"Bad Romance"	1 February 2010	4	
Deepcentral	"In Love"	March 2010	4	
The Black Eyed Peas	"Meet Me Halfway"	19 April 2010	1	
Deepcentral	"In Love"	26 April 2010	1	
Cheryl Cole	"Parachute"	6 September 2010	1	
Cheryl Cole	"Parachute"	18 October 2010	1	
Smiley featuring Pacha Man	"Love is for Free"	29 November 2010	4	
Smiley featuring Pacha Man	"Love is for Free"	3 January 2011	1	
Smiley featuring Pacha Man	"Love is for Free"	17 January 2011	1	
Caro Emerald	"A Night like This"	31 January 2011	1	
Shakira featuring Dizzee Rascal	"Loca"	7 February 2011	3	
Caro Emerald	"A Night like This"	7 March 2011	1	
Shakira featuring Dizzee Rascal	"Loca"	14 March 2011	1	
Caro Emerald	"A Night like This"	28 March 2011	1	
Jennifer Lopez featuring Pitbull	"On the Floor"	4 April 2011	1	
