= Mix FM Lebanon =

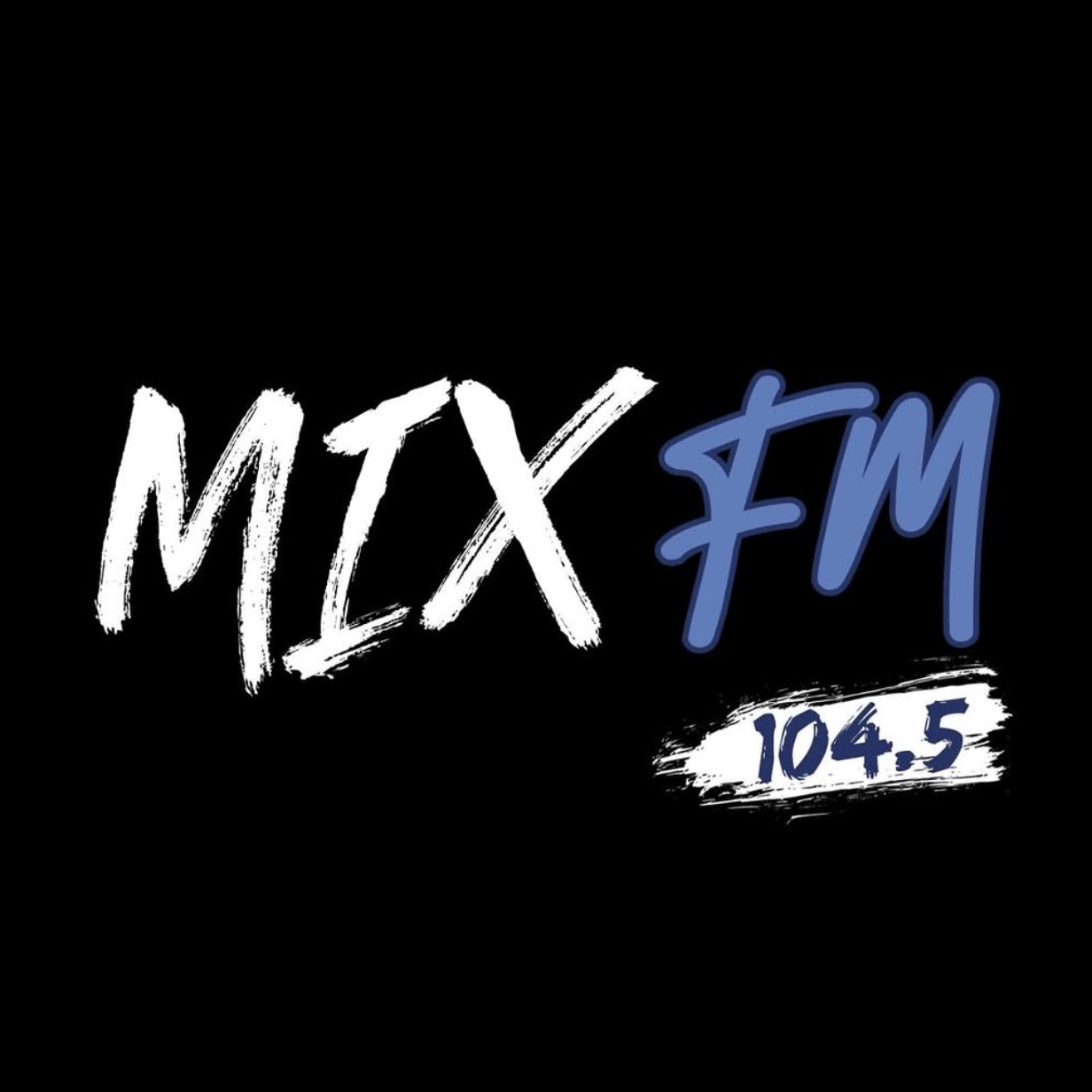

Beirut; Lebanon
- Frequency: 104.5 MHz
- RDS: [_MIX_FM_]
- Branding: Mix FM

Programming
- Language: English
- Format: Top 40

Ownership
- Owner: Roger Saad (DJ Rodge)

History
- First air date: 23 February 1996

Technical information
- ERP: 50 kW

Links
- Website: www.mixfm.com.lb

Mix FM Lebanon (104.5 MHz FM) is a radio station serving Lebanon. The radio station's studios are located in Beirut. It is owned by Lebanese DJ Rodge (Roger Saad), and was first broadcast on 23 February 1996. The station formerly broadcast on 104.4 & 104.7 FM until February 14, 2025, when it transitioned to 104.5 FM.

== Number one songs by year ==
These songs hit #1 on Mix FM's Top 100 Songs:

- 1996: Coolio - "Gangsta's Paradise"
- 1997: Puff Daddy - "I'll Be Missing You"
- 1998: Celine Dion - "My Heart Will Go On"
- 1999: Britney Spears - "...Baby One More Time"
- 2000: Madonna – “Music”
- 2001: Kylie Minogue – “Can't Get You Out of My Head”
- 2002: Las Ketchup – “Asereje”
- 2003: Beyoncé and Jay-Z – “Crazy In Love”
- 2004: Usher ft. Ludacris and Lil Jon - “Yeah!”
- 2005: Madonna – “Hung Up”
- 2006: Shakira ft. Wyclef Jean - “Hips Don't Lie”
- 2007: Yves Larock ft Jaba – “Rise Up”
- 2008: Guru Josh Project – “Infinity”
- 2009: The Black Eyed Peas - “I Gotta Feeling”
- 2010: Rihanna & Eminem - “Love the Way You Lie”
- 2011: Adele - “Rolling in the Deep”
- 2012: Fun. feat. Janelle Monáe - “We Are Young”
- 2013: Avicii feat. Aloe Blacc - “Wake Me Up”
- 2014: John Legend - “All Of Me”
- 2015: Adele - “Hello”
- 2016: Sia - “Cheap Thrills”
- 2017: Ed Sheeran - “Shape of You”
- 2018: Maroon 5 feat. Cardi B - “Girls Like You”
- 2019: Shawn Mendes & Camila Cabello - “Señorita”

The station stopped producing its annual Top 100 Songs list after 2019 due to the cancellation of its live shows and a shift to automated programming. This operational change resulted in the discontinuation of the Top 100 Songs feature, which had been a significant part of Mix FM’s programming.

== Shows and Programs ==
On Air:

- The Mixtape Weekdays, 8am - 9pm
- The Retro Years, Thursday, 8 pm – 9 pm
- The Weekend Powermix with Rodge, 6 pm – 7 pm Saturday and Sunday
- Mix FM Sunday Brunch, Sunday, noon – 1 pm
- The Official Lebanese Top 20, Mondays at 7 pm
- Vibora Radio, Fridays at 10pm
- Clapcast by Claptone, Fridays at 11 pm
- Mimo Radio, Fridays at 12 am
- Global Residency by Shimza, Saturdays at 11 pm
- Purified by Nora En Pure, Saturdays at 12 am

Former:

- Clint Maximus in the Morning, Monday to Friday, 7 am till 10 am
- 80s at 8, Weekdays 8am - 9am
- Nemr in the Afternoon, Monday to Friday, 5 pm till 7 pm
- Club Frequency with maDJam, Friday, 10 pm – 11 pm
- Hardwell on Air, Friday, 11 pm – 1 am
- The Edge Radio Show with Clint Maximus, Friday night / Saturday morning, Starting 02am
- The Mix FM Top 20, Saturday and Sunday, (2 pm – 3 pm Sat) (8 pm – 9 pm Sun)
- Tim live, Saturday, 9 pm – 10 pm
- A State of Trance with Armin van Buuren, Saturday, 10 pm – 12 am
- Club Life by Tiësto, Saturday night / Sunday Morning, 12 am – 2 am
- Drumcode with Adam Beyer, Saturday night / Sunday morning, 2 am – 4 am
- The Mix FM Road Show
- Circoloco

== Hosts ==
- John Saad (Replacing Clint Maximus in the Official Lebanese Top 20)

Former:

- Clint Maximus
- Nemr Abou Nassar
- Scott Phillips
