= Încă o noapte =

Single by DJ Project

from the album Povestea mea
- Released: July 2006
- Recorded: 2006
- Genre: House
- Length: 3:34
- Label: MusicMedia Services
- Producer(s): DJ Project

"Încă o noapte" is a single by Romanian dance music group DJ Project and the most successful single on their Povestea mea album. The song reached #1 on the Romanian charts in the week from 28 August to 3 September 2006, particularly becoming a summer hit on Romania's Black Sea Coast.

== Videoclip ==
The videoclip for Încă o noapte was filmed mainly in Bucharest's Embryo nightclub, known for its futuristic interior design. Parts of the clip were also filmed on Bucharest's streets at night, as well as in the city's new Mercedes-Benz Citaro buses.

== Charts ==
Chart (2006)	Peak position
Romania (Romanian Top 100)	1

== See also ==
- List of Romanian Top 100 number ones of the 2000s
