= RRA Awards 2011 =

The Radio România Actualităţi Awards 2011 (shortly RRA Awards) was held on March 13, 2011, in the Sala Radio (Radio Hall) of the Romanian Radio Broadcasting Company. The awards are yearly and they are developed by the Radio România Actualităţi, the main National Radio Channel. They will be broadcast by RRA, as well as by Radio România Muzical and Radio România Cultural. It will also be broadcast online and on TVR International all around the world. The nominations were announced via Adevărul newspaper, on February 4.

Inna topped the nominations, with four, "Artist of the Year", "Best Pop/Dance Act", "Best Pop/Dance Song" and "Album of the Year". She is followed by Alex, Ştefan Bănică, Jr., Smiley, Paula Seling, Nico and Mădălina Manole, with three awards. Keo, Andreea Banica and Andra have all two nominations.

== Awards ==
=== General ===
Artist of the Year

- Inna
- Paula Seling
- Ovi
- Mădălina Manole

Male Performance of the Year

- Keo
- Ştefan Bănică, Jr.
- Horia Brenciu

Female Performance of the Year

- Nico
- Loredana Groza
- Paula Seling

Songwriter of the Year

- Smiley
- Ovidiu Cernăuțeanu
- Adi Cristescu
- Nicolae Caragia

Best premise

- Taxi - "Cele doua Cuvinte"
- Guess Who - "Locul Potrivit"
- Vunk - "Vreau o Tara ca Afara"

Best Junior Act

- Maria Craciun
- Andreea Olariu
- Madalina Lefter

=== Pop ===
Best Pop Album

- Nico - "Love Mail"
- Mădălina Manole - "09 Mădălina"
- Ştefan Bănică, Jr. - "Superlove"

Best Pop Song

- Catalin Josan - "Don't Wanna Miss You"
- Paula Seling & Ovidiu Cernăuțeanu" - Playing With Fire"
- Nico - "Poate Undeva"
- Mădălina Manole - "Marea Dragoste"
- Smiley - "Plec pe Marte"

=== Pop/Dance ===
Best Pop/Dance Album

- Inna - "Hot"
- Alex - "Secret"
- Smiley - "Plec pe Marte"

Best Pop/Dance Song

- Elena Gheorghe - "Disco Romancing"
- Alex - "Don't Say It's Over"
- Smiley" - "Love Is for Free"
- Xonia - "My Beautiful One"
- Andra -" Something New"
- Andreea Banica - "Love in Brasil"
- Inna - "Sun Is Up"
- Alexandra Stan - "Get Back (ASAP)"

Best Dance/Pop Act

- Inna
- Smiley
- Alex
- DJ Project

=== Latin ===
Best Latin Crossover

- Andra - Abelia
- Andreea Banica - "Love in Brasil"
- Keo - "Liber"

=== Pop rock ===
Best Pop Rock Album

- Iris - "12 Porti"
- Vunk - "Ca pe Vremuri"
- Directia 5 - "Romantic"

Best Pop Rock Song

- Directia 5 - "Ai Un Loc"
- Iris - "Cat As Vrea Sa Zbor"
- Taxi - "Cele doua Cuvinte"
- Bere Gratis - "Stai Pe Acelasi"
- Vunk - "Vreau O Tara ca Afara"

Best Pop Rock Act

- Iris
- Vunk
- Directia 5
