= Plec pe Marte =

Studio album by Smiley
- Released: 30 March 2010
- Recorded: 2009–2010
- Genres: Dance-pop; funk; hip hop; soul; rap
- Length: 43:21
- Labels: Cat Music; HaHaHa Production
- Producer: Smiley

Smiley chronology
În lipsa mea (2008)	Plec pe Marte (2010)	Acasă (2013)

Singles from Plec Pe Marte
- 1. "Plec Pe Marte" Released: 30 March 2010

Plec pe Marte (Romanian pronunciation: [ˈplek pe ˈmarte]; Leaving for Mars) is the second studio album by Romanian singer Smiley, released on March 30, 2010, by Cat Music. The album peaked at number three in the Romania Top 100 charts with the main single, "Plec pe Marte", spending five weeks in the top 10 and twelve weeks altogether in the Romanian charts.

The album was nominated at the 2011 Romanian Music Awards category for the Best Albums, and at the 2011 Radio România Actualităţi Awards at the Best Pop Song category with the main single "Plec pe Marte". It also featured Cheloo, Grasu XXL, Pacha Man and Mandinga as collaborators. Unlike Smiley's previous album În lipsa mea, the preponderant language of the songs in Plec pe marte is English, with several exceptions where the songs are also interpreted in Romanian. From a total of twelve songs, the album presents four featuring singles and eight single songs.

== Album story ==
Album producer and main singer Smiley stated that he had composed the lyrics of the main single "Plec pe Marte" in roughly thirty minutes. He also added that while he was creating the beat of the music, he realized that it was similar to what fellow rapper Cheloo uses in his songs and subsequently invited him to join the work which Cheloo accepted. In the final touches, the main single's text was half written by Smiley, half by Cheloo.

=== Controversies ===
Shortly after the "Plec Pe Marte" singles video was released, by filing a complaint to the Romanian National Audiovisual Council (CNA), the Civic Alliance of the Romani people in Romania (ACRR) requested the video to be banned, claiming that it promotes racist messages, which incite racial hatred and violence, by showing Cheloo wearing a T-shirt with the message "White and Proud". The number "14" visibly written on the T-shirt worn by Cheloo in this video have had racist meanings, claimed ACRR. Later, CNA decided that the video did not aim to incite any racial hatred, so the final decision was not to ban it from social platforms. Later on, both Cheloo and Smiley denied any accusations of racial harassment through the videoclip, stating that it's far beyond their interests to do such things.

== Track listing ==
All tracks are written by Smiley.

No.	Title	Length
1.	"Get You Busy"	3:14
2.	"Trouble"	3:47
3.	"I'm Sorry"	3:47
4.	"Plec Pe Marte (Leaving for Mars)" (featuring Cheloo)	3:55
5.	"Dream Girl"	3:09
6.	"Du-te (Go)" (featuring Grasu XXL)	2:47
7.	"Hello"	4:32
8.	"Love is for Free" (featuring Pacha Man)	3:48
9.	"Plouă (Rain)"	2:58
10.	"Toygun"	4:26
11.	"One Woman" (featuring Mandinga)	3:59
12.	"Going Home"	2:58
Total length:		43:21

== Personnel ==
- Smiley – vocals, production, arrangements
  - Text – Smiley, Cheloo, Grasu XXL, Pacha Man, Alejandro Martinez and Karie
  - Music (instruments) – Marius Pop (guitar), Marcel Moldovan (drums), Radu Niculescu (guitar-bass), Alexandru Racoviţă (keyboards), Şerban Cazan (keyboards)
  - Mixing – Andrei Kerestely (Mini Sound Studio)
  - Mastering – Alex Kloos (Time Tools Mastering)

== Release history ==
- 2010 Romania: CD Cat Music 101 2715 2
