= Plec pe Marte (song) =

2010 single by Smiley

Single by Smiley featuring Cheloo

from the album Plec pe Marte
- Language: Romanian
- Released: January 28, 2010
- Recorded: 2010
- Genre: Hip hop; soft pop
- Length: 3:55
- Label: Cat Music; HaHaHa Production

Smiley singles chronology
"Am Bani de Dat (Tengo dinero)" (2008)	"Plec pe Marte" (2010)	"Love Is for Free" (2010)

Music video
- "Plec pe Marte" on YouTube

"Plec pe Marte" (Romanian pronunciation: [ˈplek pe ˈmarte]; "Leaving for Mars") is a single by Romanian singer Smiley, which headlines the album with the same title Plec pe Marte, released on January 28, 2010. The song peaked at number one in the Romania Top 20 chart, spending fifteen weeks there, and five weeks in the most-broadcast songs on Romanian radio stations in the 2010s (and Top 100).

The song was directly nominalized the at the 2011 Romanian Music Awards category for the Best Album with mother album Plec pe Marte. It was also nominalized at the Radio România Actualităţi Awards 2011 category Best Pop Song.

== Music video ==
=== Story ===
A music video for the song was released on February 26, 2010, and was directed and produced by Smiley alongside HaHaHa Production and Cat Music staff.

The song characterizes a depressed side of the human person, showing main artist Smiley going through his thoughts and feelings, as the title of the song suggests (leaving for Mars), denoting that he's had enough of his problems and sorrow.

The video starts by showing him laying thoughtful in his bed. As in other videos of his songs, Smiley is again presented in multiple cameos, this time suggesting his separate griefs, with only one of his doubles getting up for the day. His first double starts the day getting scolded by his girlfriend who gives him a headache. Every time his main body feels like they've had enough of a situation, the respective double freezes in time and the main body continues their routine, invisible to anyone but the very next person they meet. Smiley then meets his landlord who barges into the apartment and demands rent arrears. Knowing he can't help with it, Smiley again freezes one of his doubles and keeps going. Further on, a debt collector visits him as they both sit down to a table in the kitchen. The man hands him a strange bill but doesn't talk to Smiley as he continues talking on the phone with someone else. Smiley freezes again. He then goes to sit on the couch from the living room and doubles himself again. His main body asks one of his halfs "don't you know where I live?". This brings a direct reference to some lyrics of the song saying "luck was looking for me but they didn't know where I live". The video then shows a big bunch of Smiley's friends who happily barge into his apartment and shamelessly began throwing a drinking party. Obviously not in the mood of having fun, Smiley doubles again, leaving his friends to spend their time with a couple of his frozen doubles.

When about to again try to exit his apartment, Smiley bumps into second artist of the song Cheloo, who played a robber that pushed Smiley back into the apartment by pointing a gun at him. Smiley puts his hands up and doubles again, quickly leaving the scene. Cheloo stole all the money Smiley's friends had in their pockets, even money and the mobile phone from the debt collector who was still in the kitchen with one of Smiley's doubles. After Cheloo leaves, the crowd of friends laughs unfazed by the random situation. Smiley's main body then tries again to leave the apartment but somehow he just enters it back through another door, seeing nobody but his previous doubles who began to move. He then lays back down is his bed where the original body from the beginning of the video was staying, with the rest of the doubles presumably vanishing. The video ends with a weird bus passing through the apartment, aspect which suggested his desired departure.

=== Video controversies ===
Shortly after the "Plec pe Marte" singles video was released, by filing a complaint to the Romanian National Audiovisual Council (CNA), the Civic Alliance of the Romani people in Romania (ACRR) requested the video to be banned, claiming that it promotes racist messages, which incite racial hatred and violence, by showing Cheloo wearing a T-shirt with the message "White and Proud". The number "14" visibly written on the T-shirt worn by Cheloo in this video have had racist meanings, claimed ACRR. Later, CNA decided that the video did not aim to incite any racial hatred, with the final decision being not to ban it from social platforms or any other audiovisual broadcast facilities. Later on, both Cheloo and Smiley denied any accusations of racial harassment through the videoclip, stating that it's far beyond their interests to do such things.

== Charts ==
Chart	Peak position
Romanian top 20	1
Romanian Top 100	3

== Personnel ==
- Smiley – vocals, production, arrangements
  - Text – Smiley, Cheloo
  - Music (instruments) – Marius Pop (guitar), Marcel Moldovan (drums), Radu Niculescu (guitar-bass), Alexandru Racoviţă (keyboards), Şerban Cazan (keyboards)
  - Mixing – Andrei Kerestely (Mini Sound Studio)
  - Mastering – Alex Kloos (Time Tools Mastering)

== Release history ==
- 2010 Romania (as part of Plec pe Marte): CD Cat Music 101 2715 2
