= Mira (singer) =

MIRA
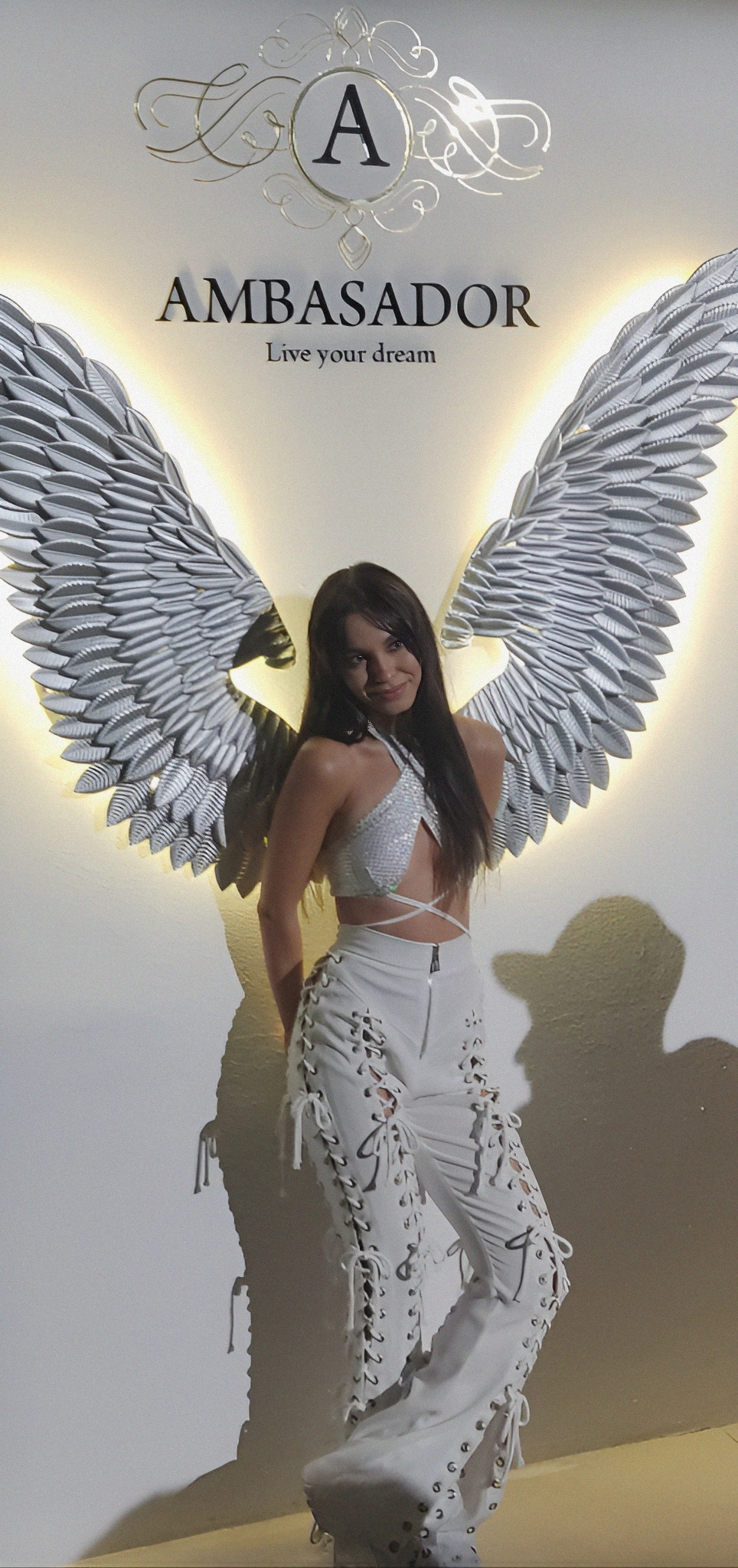

Background information
- Also known as: MIRA
- Born: Maria Mirabela Cismaru; March 12, 1995 (age 31); Târgu-Jiu, Gorj, Romania
- Genres: Pop, dance
- Occupation: Singer
- Instruments: Vocals, guitar, piano
- Years active: 2012–present
- Labels: Global Records, Cat Music, BEAR Music, HaHaHa Production

Maria Mirabela Cismaru (born March 12, 1995, in Târgu-Jiu), known by the stage name Mira (stylized MIRA), is a Romanian singer. Mira became known once she appeared in the second season of the talent show Vocea României, where she had the singer and composer Marius Moga as her mentor.

== Biography ==
Ever since she was little, Mira accompanied her mother to weddings in her hometown, with whom she sang folk music. At the age of 13, she enrolled at the Children's Palace in Târgu Jiu, where she studied music for three years. Mira then joined the Anonym Band, during which she discovered her passion for the guitar. Mira also tried to promote herself on the Internet, performing covers that garnered thousands of views on YouTube.

Mira also got noticed in beauty contests. In December 2011, she won the "Miss Crăciunița" contest from Rovinari, managing to outrank the other contestants. In the same year, she also won first prize at the "Iulian Andreescu" National Light Music Festival.

Mira made her appearance in the music world in 2012, alongside DJ Marc Ryan, then under the name Aria, with the song So (la la). In the same year she participated in the show Vocea României, in Marius Moga's team. After participating in Vocea României, Mira built a musical career and released many successful songs.

Her first songs under the name of Mirabela or Mira were collaborations with Alexinno on "Loving You" and "In Love" in 2013 and Zhao on "Zi-mi ceva" in 2014. Starting in 2014, she became a Global Records artist, becoming colleagues with Inna, Antonia, Sasha Lopez and Lariss, among others. The first solo single followed: "Like", a song composed by Theea Miculescu. Also in 2014, she released one of her favorite songs, "Dragostea nu se stinge" in collaboration with Kio and What's Up which had great success. "Dragostea nu se stinge" is also the song that launched her career, making her known to the general public.

In 2015, Mira released the solo song "Balada de iubire", as well as two collaborations with Piticu' on "Petrecere de adio" and Corina and Skizzo Skillz on "Fete din Balcani", the latter being a hit with tens of millions of views on YouTube. If 2016 was a little short on music with only the successful song "Bella", 2017 was a very packed year. In March 2017, she released the song "Anii mei" and in September "Uit de tine", two of the artist's most successful singles to date. Also in 2017, in September, Mira became the new soloist of the band DJ Project, along with which she released two songs: "Omnia" (November 2017) and "Inimă nebună" (March 2018).

The year 2018 can be said to have been the year of consecration. After hits like "Dragostea nu se stinge", "Bella", "Anii mei", "Uit de tine", Mira won the category "Star Debut" in the awards Antena Stars and released two solo tracks "Vina" and "Tu mă faci" as well as collaborations with DJ Project on "Inimă nebună", and Vescan on "Ce-o fi, o fi", which solidified her position among the most appreciated and loved artists in Romania. In May, she was also selected to sing at "FORZA ZU", one of the biggest concerts organized in the country where the most popular singers participate, a concert with free entry, organized by Radio ZU. In December, she also sang in the special program "Orașul Faptelor Bune" ("City of Good Deeds") also organized by Radio ZU, a charity concert meant to help raise money for the cases presented throughout the day.

The year 2019 was marked by two more hits by the already famous artist: "Cum de te lasă" and "Străzile din București" (feat. Florian Rus). This year again Mira was invited to sing both at "FORZA ZU" and at "Orașul Faptelor Bune", certifying her place among other famous Romanian artists.

2020 was the busiest year, with song after song, in preparation for the release of her first album. During the gala "I Success – Femei de succes" Mira received the award for "The most streamed pop artist of 2020". This year Mira released no less than 8 songs, 6 of which from the album, a collaboration with Lino Golden ("Maracas"), and a cover of the international hit from O-ZONE, "Dragostea din tei". Mira was again on the list of artists at "FORZA ZU", a concert that could not take place due to the global pandemic.

The album "MiraDivina" was launched in January 2021 in "Cărturesți" bookstores and in online and in March everywhere else.

In 2021 she also released the last 2 songs from the album: "Arctic" and "Zi merci" which had a video release. The first song released this year was however "Nave spațiale". In July she released the song "Cheia inimii mele" in which the successful partnership with DJ Project is renewed. On November 11, Mira surprised her fans and posted on her YouTube channel a Christmas carol with her mother, Aurelia Cimpoieru entitled "Dragă moșule", the official video being released on December 1. On November 16 of the same year 2021, Mira released a new song titled, "Deziubește-mă", a long-awaited collaboration with singer Mario Fresh. She also announced that she will release a 2nd album which will be composed only of feats and it is already in the works.

At the beginning of April, Mira released the first track of 2022 titled "Tu cu ea". The song is a new collaboration, this time with Lora and it could be heard for the first time on Radio ZU on 06-04-2022, two days before the official release. In May 2022 Mira released a new single – "Toată noaptea", a new collaboration, this time with Juno, under his real name Alex Stanciu.

After the songs released alongside DJ Project, Mario Fresh, Lora, and Juno, Mira released on October 14 a new single entitled "16 ani" together with Uzzi, a memnber in the band B.U.G. Mafia under his real name, "Adrian Alin Demeter".

If at the beginning of December 2021, Mira released the first carol with her mother, on December 8, 2022, she released the first collage of carols on her YouTube channel. The collage contains 6 traditional carols, one of them being sung again with her mother, Aurelia Cimpoieru. Also in December, the charity concerts were resumed within the special program "Orașul Faptelor Bune" ("City of Good Deeds") to which Mira was again invited.

At the beginning of 2023, Mira officially announced the changes made in her team during the past year, thus, the new manager is currently Monica Munteanu, the Forward Agency handles the concerts and collaborates with the production house HaHaHa Production.

The first track of 2023 was "Strawberry Heart". After a series of collaborations, this is her first solo song from her in over a year and it's also her first full song in English. At the end of March, Mira returned with a new solo single titled "N-am să te las". Less than a month later, the singer released a new song, a collaboration with Bvcovia, under his real name Raduly Ioan Marian.

== Personal life ==
Mira attended the first three years of high school at the "Spiru Haret" National College in Târgu Jiu, to later enroll at the "Dumitru Dumitrescu" Technological High School in Buftea to finish her high school studies. She wanted from the bottom of her heart to make a career in music, so she moved to Bucharest when she was only 18 years old, where she stayed in a rented house with a friend of his mother's. A few years later, in 2020, in an interview for the TV channel Pro TV, she declared "I wanted to make music, I don't see any other option for me, my mother didn't want me to make music!". Following her dream but also continuing her studies, in 2017 she graduated from the Faculty of Letters at the University of Bucharest, majoring in ethnology, cultural anthropology, and folklore.

In September 2017, Mira and the boys from DJ Project were injured in a road accident near Vâlcea. The artist's half-brother, Robert Cimpoieru, died in March 2018, also in a car accident. Mira has stated she was able to work through this difficult period well and was able to once again enjoy life to the fullest. In 2020 she managed to fulfill another dream, that of having her own house. In an interview for the September issue of "Cosmopolitan" magazine, being asked what she likes about the new house and if it represents her, Mira stated the following: "I like everything! I thought about every bit of it. I put my heart into it, and probably because it's the first one, I don't know if I'll behave like this again the next time. It took a lot of time, but the satisfaction is worth it. Whoever built a house and thought it through from all points of view, I'm sure knows how difficult it is!".

== Discography ==
=== Singles ===
Titles	Year	Positions
Titles	Year	(Romania) ROU
"So (la la)" (feat. DJ Marc Ryan)	2012	
"Loving You" (feat. Allexinno)	2013	
"In Love" (feat. Allexinno)	2013	
"Zi-mi ceva" (feat. Zhao)	2014	
"Like"	2014	
"Masca lui Zorro"	2014	
"Dragostea nu se stinge" (feat. Kio & What's UP)	2014	
"Balade de iubire"	2015	
"Fete din Balcani" (feat. Corina & Skizzo Skillz)	2015	
"Petrecere de adio" (feat. Piticu)	2015	
"Bella"	2016	
"Anii mei"	2017	
"Uit de tine"	2017	
"Omnia" (feat. DJ Project)	2017	
"Drăguț de sărbători"	2017	
"Vina"	2018	
"Inimă nebună" (feat. DJ Project)	2018	
"Ce-o fi, o fi" (feat. Vescan)	2018	
"Tu mă faci"	2018	
"Cum De Te Lasă"	2019	
"Străzile din București" (feat. Florian Rus)	2019	1
"Maldita Noche"	2019	
"Cădere în Gol" (feat. Alex Velea)	2019	
"De ce?"	2020	
"Plus și minus"	2020	
"O privire"	2020	
"Învață-mă"	2020	
"Maracas" (feat. Lino Golden)	2020	
"Dragostea din Tei" (cover O-ZONE)	2020	
"Zero Absolut"	2020	
"Cineva"	2020	
"Nave spațiale"	2021	
"Arctic"	2021	
"Zi merci"	2021	
"Cheia inimii mele" (feat. DJ Project)	2021	
"Dragă Moșule" (feat. Aurelia Cimpoieru)	2021	
"Deziubește-mă" (feat. Mario Fresh)	2021	
"Tu cu ea" (feat. Lora)	2022	
"Toată noaptea" (feat. Juno)	2022	
"16 ani" (feat. Uzzi)	2022	
"Strawberry Heart"	2023	
"N-am să te las"	2023	
"Bye, Bye" (feat. Bvcovia)	2023	
"Come with me"	2023	
"Alo, alo" (feat. Vescan)	2023	
"Ca-n România" (feat. Theo Rose)	2023	
"Dor de tine"	2024	
„Bad booty”	2024	
„Ce ai tu”	2024	
„Ring, ring”	2024	
„Duro”	2024	
„Ladida”	2024	
„Să fii tu" (feat. Rareș)	2024	
„Love again”	2024	
„E româncă" (feat. Juno)	2024	
„Încă ne iubim" (feat. Florian Rus)	2024	
„Bota”	2024	
„Toată Lumea Dansează”	2025	
„Nu mă ia”	2025	
„Bună dimineața" (feat. Liviu Teodorescu)	2025	
„Cu tălpile goale”	2025	
„Yanana"	2025	
„Aleg să zâmbesc"	2025	
„Dorul tău”	2026	
„Medicamentul"	2026	
„Lume"	2026	
„Marile lucruri mici" (feat. Sami G)	2026	
„Caramela"	2026	
„Omule ești muritor” (feat. Vescan)		

=== Albums ===
- 2021 – "MiraDivina"
