= Rise Up (Yves Larock album) =

Studio album by Yves Larock
- Released: September 26, 2008
- Genre: House, dance
- Label: Sirup Music
- Producer: Yves Larock

Yves Larock chronology
Rise Up (2008)	Manego (2009)

Singles from Rise Up
- 1. "Rise Up" Released: May 7, 2007; 2. "By Your Side" Released: 2008; 3. "Say Yeah" Released: 2008

Rise Up is the debut album by Swiss DJ Yves Larock, released on September 26, 2008.

== Track listing ==
Track	Title	Featuring	Duration
1	"Rise Up"	Jaba	2:49
2	"Say Yeah!"	Jaba	3:15
3	"Listen to the Voice Inside"	Steve Edwards	3:18
4	"The Night"	Diane B	2:58
5	"Sound of My Heart"	Matt Jamison	3:34
6	"By Your Side"	Jaba	3:28
7	"Things You Do"	Robin One	3:24
8	"I Want More"	Jaba	3:26
9	"Sunshine Behind"	Jaba	3:27
10	"The Heat"	Linda Lee Hopkins	3:47
11	"Respect"	Jaba	3:59
12	"On My Own"	Robin One	3:55
13	"Good Old Days"	Matt Jamison	3:52
14	"Anymore"	Diane B	4:06
15	"Rise Up" (Moonraisers Remix)	Jaba	4:03

== Charts ==
Chart	Peak position
Swiss Albums Chart	94

== Release history ==
Country	Date	Format	Label
Switzerland	September 26, 2008	CD	Sirup Music
United Kingdom	April 28, 2009	CD	Universal
United States	April 28, 2009	CD	SPG
