= Două Anotimpuri =

Două anotimpuri (Two seasons)

Studio album by DJ Project
- Released: June 22, 2007
- Recorded: 2006–2007
- Genre: Dance
- Length: 53:41
- Label: Cat Music

DJ Project chronology
Povestea mea (2006)	Două anotimpuri (Two seasons) (2007)	In the club (2009)

Două anotimpuri (Two seasons) is the sixth album by DJ Project, released on June 22, 2007. Două anotimpuri (Two seasons) made a hit by selling over 10,000 copies.

The album perfectly combines two feelings, optimism and melancholy. As always, the band has successfully made another Hit album, and with new records, the song "Două anotimpuri"(Two Seasons) is the Top 1 in the Nielsen rankings, his ranking monitors the broadcasts numbers of the radios and the TVs, at a national level.

The first single from the album of the same name, "Două anotimpuri" (Two Seasons) has accumulated 30,672 points at a thousand points difference to the next classic piece, "Big Girls Do not Cry" – Fergie, being the most broadcast song in Romania and undoubtedly the hit of the summer that has just ended. Although the song is different from what the band has released so far, the audience was captured, like always, with the voice of Ellie White and the musical personality of DJ Gino Manzotti and Maxx, who clearly made their mark on the new album.

== Track listing ==
No.	Title	Text	Length
1.	"Două Anotimpuri (Two seasons) (Radio)"	Gabriel Huiban	3:16
2.	"Departe De Noi (Away from us)"	Gabriel Huiban, Lazăr Cercel	3:39
3.	"Prima Noapte (First night)"	Alexandru Pelin	3:49
4.	"Wherever U Go (Radio)"	Frank Knebel, Lizzy Pattinson, Reinhard Raith	3:07
5.	"Lacrimi De Înger (Tears of Angel)"	Lazăr Cercel	3:54
6.	"Tell My Why"	Baltagan Elena	3:03
7.	"Un Singur Drum (A Single Road)"	Gabriel Huiban	3:50
8.	"Take My Soul"		6:35
9.	"Free Your Mind"	Giuseppe Handke	8:16
10.	"Două Anotimpuri (Two seasons) (Extended)"	Gabriel Huiban	5:00
11.	"Wherever U Go (Extended)"	Frank Knebel, Lizzy Pattinson, Reinhard Raith	5:33
12.	"In My Heart (Mootoo Rmx)"	Baltagan Elena	3:43
Total length:			53:41

== Charts ==
Chart (2007)	Peak position
Romanian Top 100	2
