= Love Is for Free =

2010 single by Smiley

Single by Smiley featuring Pacha Man

from the album Plec pe Marte
- Released: May 28, 2010
- Recorded: 2010
- Genre: Reggae, dance-pop
- Length: 3:48
- Label: HaHaHa Production; Cat Music

Smiley singles chronology
"Plec pe Marte" (2010)	"Love Is for Free" (2010)	"Dream Girl" (2011)

Music video
- "Love is for Free" on YouTube

"Love is for Free" is a single by Romanian singer Smiley from the album Plec pe Marte released on May 28, 2010. The song peaked at number one in the Romania Top 20 chart, spending ten weeks there, and seven weeks in the most-broadcast songs on Romanian radio stations in the 2010s (and Top 100). The song was also featured in the Nielsen Music Control and Uniunea Producătorilor de Fonograme din România (UPFR) top 100 number ones for six weeks between November 29, 2010 and January 17, 2011.

At the 2011 Romanian Music Awards the song won the special prize of the Most Broadcast Tune (Media Forest) and was nominalized for the Best Song category. It was also nominalized at the Radio România Actualităţi Awards 2011 category Best Pop/Dance Song.

== Music video ==
A music video for the song was released on September 23, 2010, and was directed and produced by Smiley alongside HaHaHa Production and Cat Music staff.

The video starts by showing a girl riding an old scooter in the middle of a cornfield. Suddenly she gets stuck and out of gas as she sees a solitary microphone stand. The video then shows main artist Smiley playing the very song alongside his band in the same cornfield. The girl seems to somehow be able to hear the melody, but in reality she is just imagining things. As she advances through the direction of the sound, she sees nobody but an alive scarecrow played by secondary artist of the song, Pacha Man. In the proximity, she also sees a weird door and knocks. Behind the door, the video shows Smiley living in a makeshift settlement in the middle of the cornfield. He opens the door as the girls tries to show him the alive scarecrow, but when she turns her sight back to Smiley, nothing was there. She then sees the same door open but a few feet further in the opposite direction.

She enters, finds the makeshift settlement and lays on a bed while seeing a small TV playing a video of Smiley singing in the cornfield. Distracted by the TV's program, the girls suddenly falls on the ground as the bed vanishes. Smiley helps her up and sits her down to a table where he pours her some tea. The table also vanishes, while the video starts to concentrate on both Smiley and the girl dancing lascivious on the song's rhythm. As night falls, the pair continues to have fun at Smiley's settlement. The video ends with the girl watching Smiley and his band playing the very song with both of them remaining together in the end.

As the name of the song hints (Love is For Free), the video demonstrates that love can be found in simple and ephemeral things.

== Charts ==
Chart	Peak position
Romanian top 20	1
Romanian Top 100	1
Bulgaria Top 100	12

== Release history ==
- 2010 Romania (as part of Plec pe Marte): CD Cat Music 101 2715 2
