= Moonraisers =

Reggae band in Neuchâtel, Switzerland

- Origin: Neuchâtel, Switzerland
- Genres: Reggae, Moonstyle Reggae
- Years active: 1992–present
- Label: Damp Music
- Members: Jaba; Armando Ribeiro; Marc-Olivier; Dani; Minh-Anh; Franco CasaGrande; Denis; Xavier Nussbaum
- Website: www.moonraisers.com

Moonraisers are a reggae band formed in 1992 and based in Neuchâtel, Switzerland. Their style, described as a form of electronic reggae called World’n’Moonstyle Reggae, combines roots reggae elements with funk, world music, and electro music. They are best known for composing the original version of the dance super track Rise Up. Although the song achieved little commercial success initially, it later gained popularity in clubs following a dance cover by Yves Larock.

== Discography ==
=== Albums ===
- Mirror (13 self produced songs, 1996)

1. Intro Nine Miles / 2. Get Up / 3. Joyless People / 4. Legal Destruction / 5. Right Way / 6. Mystic Dreams / 7. Surviving Children / 8. Make Change The World / 9. Rastaman Rebellation / 10. Moonrais Revolution / 11. Shining World / 12. No Want To Give Up / 13. Mirror / 14.Shamans Groove

- World Without Wars (5 self produced songs, 1997)

1. Let Peace Rule / 2. 1st May 2000 / 3. Reggae 2000 / 4. Guilty / 5. Make Change The World

- Legacy (14 songs produced by The Source Music Production, Pedi Sterchi and Moonraisers, 1999)

1. Dreams / 2. Thanks For All / 3. Not Afraid / 4. Hey World / 5. Time / 6. Four Crows / 7. New World / 8. Spirit Tango / 9. Music Evolution / 10. Can't Fly Too High / 11. Radja Ska / 12. Maconha / 13. Oh Child / 14. Hope Groove

- Live (9 self produced live songs, 2001)

1. Can't Fly Too High (Live) / 2. Guilty (Live) / 3. Hey World (Live) / 4. New World (Live) / 5. Not Afraid (Live) / 6. Peanuts (Live) / 7. Spirit Tango (Live) / 8. Train of Bagdad (Live) / 9. 4 Crows (Live)

- Human (12 songs produced byr P.Brunkow, 2003)

1. Human / 2. 8 Giants / 3. Time Run / 4. Difference / 5. For Real / 6. Goes Around / 7. Congo Square / 8. Talking / 9. Slave Station / 10. So Much Trouble / 11. Who Can Prove It / 12. Full Moon

- Do The Right Step (15 songs produced by Damp Music, 2007)

1. Solidarity / 2. pPppet Master / 3. White Spliff / 4. Rise Up / 5. Funky Reggae Party / 6. Hotel California / 7. One God / 8. Rain A Fall / 9. To Those / 10. Why Take It / 11. Good Vibes / 12. $ Ship / 13. The Sun Shine For All / 14. Transition / 15. Intronisation

- Who are we? (15 songs produced by Damp Music, 2018)

1. Back on track / 2. Letting Go / 3. No Need / 4. Slave Get Free / 5. Mental Uprise / 6. Waste Nuff Time / 7. Rectreate Paradise / 8. Right nor Wrong / 9. Comes Around / 10. Keep Track / 11. Segregation / 12. Lion Gate / 13. Divide Us / 14. Don't Worship / 15. Chase the Moon

=== Singles ===
- Goes Around (3 versions produced by P. Brunkow, 2003)

1. Goes Around / 2. Goes Around (P.Brunkow Remix) / 3. Goes Around (Extended P.Brunkow Remix)

- Hotel California (2 versions produced by Damp Music and Moonraisers, 2007)

1. Hotel California (Radio) / 2. Hotel California (Extendet)
