= Ioana Ignat =

Romanian singer (born 1998)

- Born: Ioana Ignat; 22 July 1998 (age 28); Botoșani, Romania
- Instrument: Vocals
- Years active: 2016–present

Ioana Ignat (born 22 July 1998 in Botoșani, Romania) is a Romanian singer who became known through her participation in Vocea României.

== Career ==
Ioana Ignat's first single, "Ma dezindragostesc", released in February, 2017, became, in the blink of an eye, #2 on YouTube Trending and it entered the Radio's Playlists.

May 2017 - The song "Doar pe a ta" became, very fast, the No. 1 most streamed song on TV and Radio, and was the biggest hit of 2017 spending the most time on Shazam Romania Top.

Also in 2017, Ioana Ignat dropped a new song called "Nu ma uita". In a short amount of time, it became the most popular song on the online platforms (almost 60 million views on YouTube).

In 2018, Ioana released "In palma ta", a song that, again, in a short amount of time, became No. 1 on Radio and TV Streaming Top. Today, her song, is still the most streamed song on TV and Radio.

During 2018 and 2019, Ioana Ignat had a lot of collaborations with different artists and had multiple singles: "Muritor", "De Dragul Iubirii", "Nu mai e", "Cand lumea e rea" (Dorian Popa), "Much Better" (Super Monkeys), "Vivere" (Havana), "Lacrima" (Tudor Monroe), "Te Sarut" (Pavel Stratan), "Dor De Noi" (Shift), "Asa-mi vine" (What's Up), "Ca Nebunii" (Speak).

== Discography ==
=== Singles ===
Title	Year
"Dor de iarnă" featuring Damian Drăghici	2017
"Mă dezîndrăgostesc"	2017
"Beauty in the Beast"	2017
"Doar pe a ta" featuring Edward Sanda	2017
"Nu mă uita"	2017
"Așa-mi vine" featuring What's UP	2017
"Nu mai e"	2018
"Când lumea e rea" featuring Dorian Popa	2018
"Much Better" featuring Super Monkeys	2018
"Vivere" featuring Havana	2018
"De dragul iubirii"	2018
"Dor de noi" featuring SHIFT	2018
"Lacrima"	2018
"Te sarut" featuring Pavel Stratan	2018
"Ca Nebunii" featuring Speak	2019
"Muritor"	2019
