= Giulia Anghelescu =

Giulia
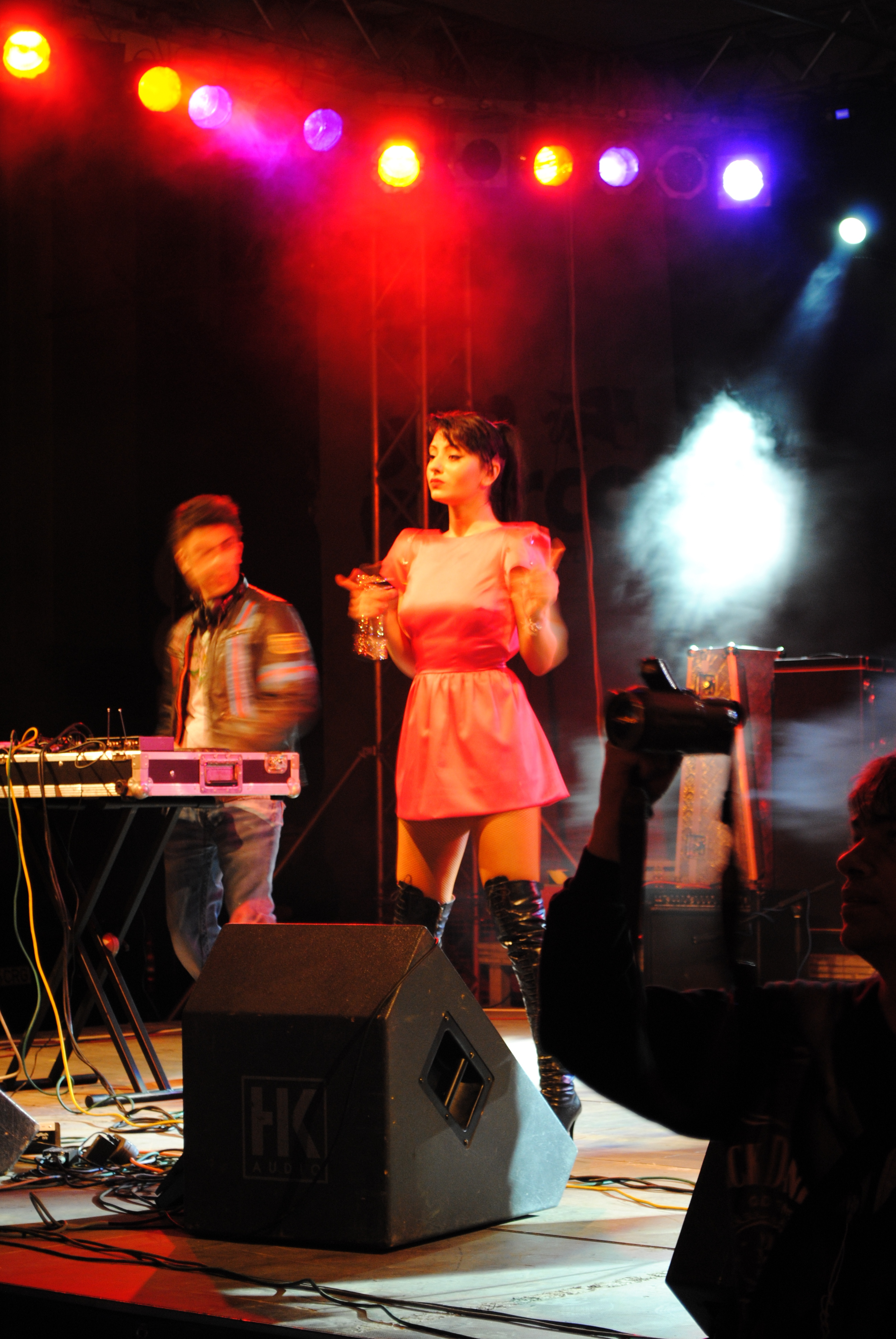
- Anghelescu performing together with DJ Project

Background information
- Born: Giulia Anghelescu; 7 November 1984 (age 42)
- Origin: Galați, Romania
- Genres: House, pop, dance,
- Occupations: Singer, occasional dj
- Instruments: Vocals, piano
- Years active: Candy: 2000–2004; Solo: 2006–present DJ Project: 2009–2011
- Labels: Media Pro, Roton Music, Cat Music, HaHaHa Productions

Giulia Anghelescu (born 7 November 1984), better known as simply Giulia is a Romanian pop/dance recording artist and occasional DJ on the Pro FM in Romania. She was the vocalist of Romanian band DJ Project until 2011.

She has one daughter named Antonia Sabina.

She was chosen to dub in Romanian Mitchie's colleague voice in the live-action movie - Camp Rock.
