= Rise Up (Yves Larock song) =

Single by Yves Larock

from the album Rise Up
- B-side: "Remix"
- Released: 7 May 2007; 28 July 2007 (remixes EP)
- Genre: House, pop
- Length: 7:35 (Original mix); 2:51 (Radio edit)
- Label: Universal
- Songwriters: Yves Cheminade; Jaba Gawan Seiler; Pascal Brunkow
- Producer: Yves Larock

Yves Larock singles chronology
"Attack of the Firebird" (2007)	"Rise Up" (2007)	"By Your Side" (2008)

Alternative cover
- Alternate single cover

"Rise Up" is a song co-written and recorded by Swiss DJ and producer Yves Larock, featuring uncredited vocals by Jaba from the Swiss reggae band Moonraisers. It was released in May 2007 as the lead single from his then-upcoming debut album of the same title. To date, it remains his most successful single, having reached the top ten on many European countries' music charts. Since its release, "Rise Up" has become a major hit in clubs worldwide. Larock singled out India as a country he was particularly surprised to learn had embraced the single.

== Track listings ==
Digital download

1. "Rise Up" (Radio Edit) – 2:51

CD Maxi Single

1. "Rise Up" (Radio Edit) – 2:52
2. "Rise Up" (Original Mix) – 7:35
3. "Rise Up" (Vandalism Remix) – 6:34
4. "Rise Up" (Harry 'Choo Choo' Romero Remix) – 9:35
5. "Rise Up" (Raul Rincon Remix) – 7:49
6. "Rise Up" (Club Мix) – 6:12
7. "Rise Up" (Dub Mix) – 8:19

EP

1. "Rise Up" (Raul Rincon Vox Mix) – 7:50
2. "Rise Up" (Harry Choo Choo Remix) – 9:33
3. "Rise Up" (Vandalism Remix) – 6:33
4. "Rise Up" (Lunatik Yves Remix) – 7:50
5. "Rise Up" (Original Mix) – 7:34
6. "Rise Up" (Club Mix) – 6:11
7. "Rise Up" (Lunatik Yves Dub Mix) – 7:28
8. "Rise Up" (Radio Edit) – 2:50
9. "Rise Up" (Club Radio) – 3:22

== Charts ==
=== Weekly charts ===
Chart (2007–2008)	Peak position
Austria (Ö3 Austria Top 40)	58
Belgium (Ultratop 50 Flanders)	10
Belgium (Ultratop 50 Wallonia)	29
CIS Airplay (TopHit)	2
Finland (Suomen virallinen lista)	3
France (SNEP)	8
Germany (GfK)	72
Greece (IFPI)	1
Hungary (Dance Top 40)	3
Hungary (Rádiós Top 40)	16
Ireland (IRMA)	31
Italy (FIMI)	4
Netherlands (Dutch Top 40)	5
Netherlands (Single Top 100)	5
Romania (Romanian Top 100)	1
Russia Airplay (TopHit)	2
Scottish Singles Sales (Official Charts)	12
Slovakia Airplay (ČNS IFPI)	27
Spain (Los 40 Principales)	1
Sweden (Sverigetopplistan)	32
Switzerland (Schweizer Hitparade)	16
UK Singles (Official Charts)	13
UK Dance (Official Charts)	1

=== Year-end charts ===
Chart (2007)	Position
Belgium (Ultratop 50 Flanders)	73
CIS (Tophit)	6
France (SNEP)	80
Hungary (Dance Top 40)	12
Netherlands (Dutch Top 40)	19
Netherlands (Single Top 100)	29
Romania (Romanian Top 100)	19
Russia Airplay (TopHit)	7
Switzerland (Schweizer Hitparade)	85
Chart (2008)	Position
Belgium (Ultratop 50 Wallonia)	99
Brazil (Crowley)	60
Hungary (Dance Top 40)	17
Hungary (Rádiós Top 40)	63
Russia Airplay (TopHit)	86
Spain (PROMUSICAE)	49
Switzerland (Schweizer Hitparade)	47

=== Decade-end charts ===
Decade-end chart performance for "Rise Up"
Chart (2000–2009)	Position
CIS Airplay (TopHit)	11
Russia Airplay (TopHit)	8

== Certifications ==
Region	Certification	Certified units/sales
Spain (Promusicae)	Platinum	40,000^{^}
Spain (Promusicae) Ringtone	Platinum	20,000^{*}
^{*} Sales figures based on certification alone.^{^} Shipments figures based on certification alone.

== See also ==
- List of Romanian Top 100 number ones
