= Mădălina Manole =

Musical artist (1967-2010)

Background information
- Born: Magdalena-Anca Manole; 14 July 1967; Vălenii de Munte, Romania
- Died: 14 July 2010 (aged 43) Otopeni, Romania
- Genres: Folk, easy listening, folklore, disco, pop
- Occupations: Singer, actress
- Instruments: Vocals, guitar
- Years active: 1982–2010
- Labels: Electrecord, Roton Music, Zone Records Polygram, Nova Music Entertainment BMG, MediaPro Music
- Formerly of: Alfa şi Beta
- Website: http://madalinamanole.ro/

Magdalena-Anca Mircea (14 July 1967 – 14 July 2010), better known by her stage name Mădălina Manole, was a Romanian pop recording artist.

== Early life ==
Magdalena-Anca Manole was born in a mountain region in the town of Vălenii de Munte of Prahova County. Her parents were Ion and Eugenia Manole. Her upbringing in a spiritual family led her to develop a passion for music. She was inspired to be a singer by her mother, who sang folk music. As a child, Magdalena-Anca was eager to learn the guitar, and so began taking lessons from Ana Ionescu Tetelea, a folk singer from Ploieşti. At age fifteen she became a member of the Cenacle Youth of Prahova, which was led at that time by the poet Lucian Avramescu. Simultaneously, Manole continued to study at The High School of Chemistry in Ploieşti, from which she successfully graduated. After graduating from the Băneasa School of Air Traffic Controllers, Mădălina Manole worked in this field for four years. As a young singer she sought musical success by forming a group with Ştefania Ghiţă called Alfa şi Beta, that participated at the shows of Cenaclul Flacăra. As such, Manole became the youngest member to participate in the circle festivities (Cenaclului Serbările Scânteii Tineretului) and at the same time worked with artists including Victor Socaciu and Roșu și Negru.

Between 1982 and 1985 the folk singer attended the art school called Şcoala Populara de Arta, as part of the group that had mentored Mihaela Runceanu and Ionel Tudor. In late 1980 Dan Ştefan entrusted her with the song "Pentru noi nu poate fi alt cer" ("For Us There Cannot Be Another Heaven"), which was featured in the movie Nelu directed by Dorin Doroftei. On this occasion the singer played her first movie role.

In 1994, she married her life partner Şerban Georgescu. At the time, the press and her fans accused her of financial motives in marrying Georgescu, given the difference in their ages. However, they divorced years later, and she remarried.

== Career ==
=== 1988–1994 ===
In 1988, Mădălina Manole met Şerban Georgescu through Costin Diaconescu, an old friend who worked at Radio România. The two artists began working together, and she participated in the same year at the music festival called Mamaia (Festivalul de Muzică Uşoară Mamaia) with the song "A Sentimental Man" ("Un Om Sentimental") composed by Georgescu.

This song received fourth place, and brought about the collaboration which had a major role in her career as a singer. In the late 1980s, Manole participated with Runceanu and Laura Stoica in a tournament in Transylvania, which was aimed at raising funds for the revitalization of the Oradea State Theater. In 1989 the singer appeared at the festival Amara Gala, which she cherished throughout her career, returning twice thereafter.

Beginning in 1990, Manole gave recitals in different regions of Romania, and a year later a Georgescu song entitled "Lovely Girl" (Fată Dragă) gained radio popularity, becoming the composition that would represent the artist. She became very popular and signed a management contract with Electrecord. Her first album was released in 1991 by this company. Simultaneously, her first fan club was created, led by students Ciprian Antochi and Claudia Panaite. In 1992 branches opened around the country. At the time, Manole began to perform on stage, performing internationally to the Romanian diaspora located in the United States, Austria, Belgium and Germany.

Given the commercial success of "Lovely Girl" (Fată Dragă) and her popularity, Billboard magazine ran a piece on her. Manole decided to record a new album in 1993. The album, entitled So what? (Ei și ce?), contained eight folk-rock pieces, most of which were created by Georgescu. The album was very successful in Romania, and radio station Radio Contact called Mădălina the "best pop artist".

=== 1995–2001 ===
In 1995 she sang in the opening concert Whigfield in Bucharest, and a year later, at the opening concert of the band Los del Rio.

In 1997, she released the album Smooth, Smooth Mădălina ("Lină, lină Mădălină"), which had a record audience. Mădălina Manole became the first performer of Romanian pop music to be registered with the great catalog of international music produced by the PolyGram Group (through Zone Records in Romania). The second noteworthy success of this album was that Mădălina Manole became the first pop artist to interpret authentic Romanian folklore in an original way, with a folk orchestra led by the late Dorel Manea. The album tracks included songs by Maria Tănase, Maria Lătăreţu, and Lucreția Ciobanu.

In 1997, she created the Cultural Association of Mădălina Manole (Asociaţia Culturală Mădălina Manole) to promote cultural and humanitarian pursuits. She was invited to attend the most important television and radio shows, and her name is remembered along with very famous entertainment and music artists. She sang at hundreds of shows in Romania, declaring:

"I remember that I was away at least 20 out of 30 days monthly! All the time I was packing and unpacking suitcases, I was missing the bed I had at home, but the auditoriums and the tens of flower bouquets I was receiving, the joy on people's faces when they were seeing me live on the streets of their towns, the dolls I was receiving from children at each show, the autographs and the letters from my fans, the songs they sang along line by line, all of these made me forget of the things less pleasant from my life as an artist, (such as) the longing for the loves ones at home, the scandalous newspaper articles, and the things that at artist has to give up, sacrifice, or keep a diet." –Mădălina Manole

With Octavian Ursulescu in 1997, Manole presented the anniversary edition of the International Festival Golden Stag of the Braşov Theatre. Mădălina Manole was chosen by Procter & Gamble International to use her image to launch a cosmetic product in Romania. She was nicknamed girl with hair of fire, alluding to the hair colour with which she appeared in the spotlight. In 2000, she obtained awards for best performer and best pop female voice of the year of Romania and Radio Awards and Music Industry Awards in Romania. In 2000, the album Sweetest of All (Dulce de Tot) was rated the best pop album by Radio România Actualităţi.

=== 2002–2010 ===
Manole was married to the composer Şerban Georgescu, 15 years older than she was. After their divorce, Mădălina Manole said, "[T]here were moments in the day that I adored him and other times when I would want to shoot him." On June 8, 2009, she gave birth to a son when she was 42 years old. The baby boy was 2,600 grams (5.7 lb) and measured 56 centimetres (22 in), born two weeks earlier than expected. In early October 2009, she married her boyfriend Peter (Petru) Mircea, and she named her son Peter (Petru) Jr. On February 19, 2010, she released a new album. The album was entitled "09 Mădălina Manole", and it was her 9th album.

While working on her album, Mădălina Manole fell ill due to accumulated fatigue.

== Death ==
Madalina was found dead by her husband at their house in the early morning of July 14, 2010, her 43rd birthday, after an apparent suicide. She allegedly caused her own death by drinking nearly half a litre of carbofuran.

Due to the fact that she killed herself, she received only a shorter religious burial service, outside the church.

Mădălina is buried at the Bolovani cemetery in Ploiești. The funeral was attended by about 5,000 people.

== Discography ==
- 1991 – Fată dragă, Electrecord
- 1993 – Ei, şi ce?, Electrecord
- 1994 – Happy New Year Electrecord
- 1995 – The best of Mădălina Manole, Electrecord
- 1996 – Trăiesc pentru tine, Roton Music
- 1997 – Lină, lină Mădălină, Zone Records Polygram
- 1998 – Cântă cu mine, Zone Records Polygram
- 2000 – Dulce de tot, Nova Music Entertainment BMG
- 2003 – A fost (va fi) iubire
- 2010 – 09 Mădălina Manole, MediaPro Music
