= Dream Girl (Smiley song) =

2011 single by Smiley

Single by Smiley

from the album Plec pe Marte
- Released: April 8, 2011
- Recorded: 2011
- Genre: Dance-pop; soul
- Length: 3:09
- Label: HaHaHa Production; Cat Music

Smiley singles chronology
| "Love Is for Free" (2010) | "Dream Girl" (2011) | "Dead Man Walking" (2012) |

Music video
- "Dream Girl" on YouTube

"Dream Girl" is a single by Romanian singer Smiley from the album Plec pe Marte released on April 8, 2011. The song peaked at number one in the Romania Top 20 chart, spending twenty-nine weeks there, and eight weeks in the most-broadcast songs on Romanian radio stations in the 2010s (and Top 100).

The song won the 2011 Romanian Music Awards category for the Best Male Artist through main singer Smiley. It was also nominalized at the category Best Video at the same ceremony.

== Music video ==
A music video for the song was released on June 9, 2011, and was directed and produced by Smiley alongside HaHaHa Production and Cat Music staff.

The video starts by showing Smiley sitting down at a table in a generic white-background space, sipping from a glass of wine and beginning to type at a stenotype. The song explains the artist's lonely mood as he is trying to write a love song about his loved one. A woman with messy makeup appears and tears down his papers. Smiley then takes a box of matches and lits up even more of his failed lyric papers. After the first refrain, the video shows the woman dressed up with more care. Then she takes a bath in a solitary tub which Smiley also sets on fire after she is done. The video shows both Smiley and the woman who supposedly represented his loved one going through different moods, from anger and frustration to dancing. As his mood finally turns down to sadness, Smiley lits their bed and her clothes on fire. The end of the video shows him catching fire as well as only his shoes remain burning.

The lyrics of the song describe the hurt from a failed romantic relationship as the very title suggests it by the phrase "my dream girl (is gone)", also explaining Smiley burning all the things that reminded him of the woman who was once his loved one. In the end, the sadness consumes him as well.

== Charts ==
| Chart (2011) | Peak position |
|---|---|
| Romanian top 20 | 1 |
| Romanian Top 100 | 1 |
| Bulgaria Top 100 | 33 |

== Release history ==
- 2011 Romania (as part of Plec pe Marte): CD Cat Music 101 2715 2
