= DJ Project =

Romanian dance music group

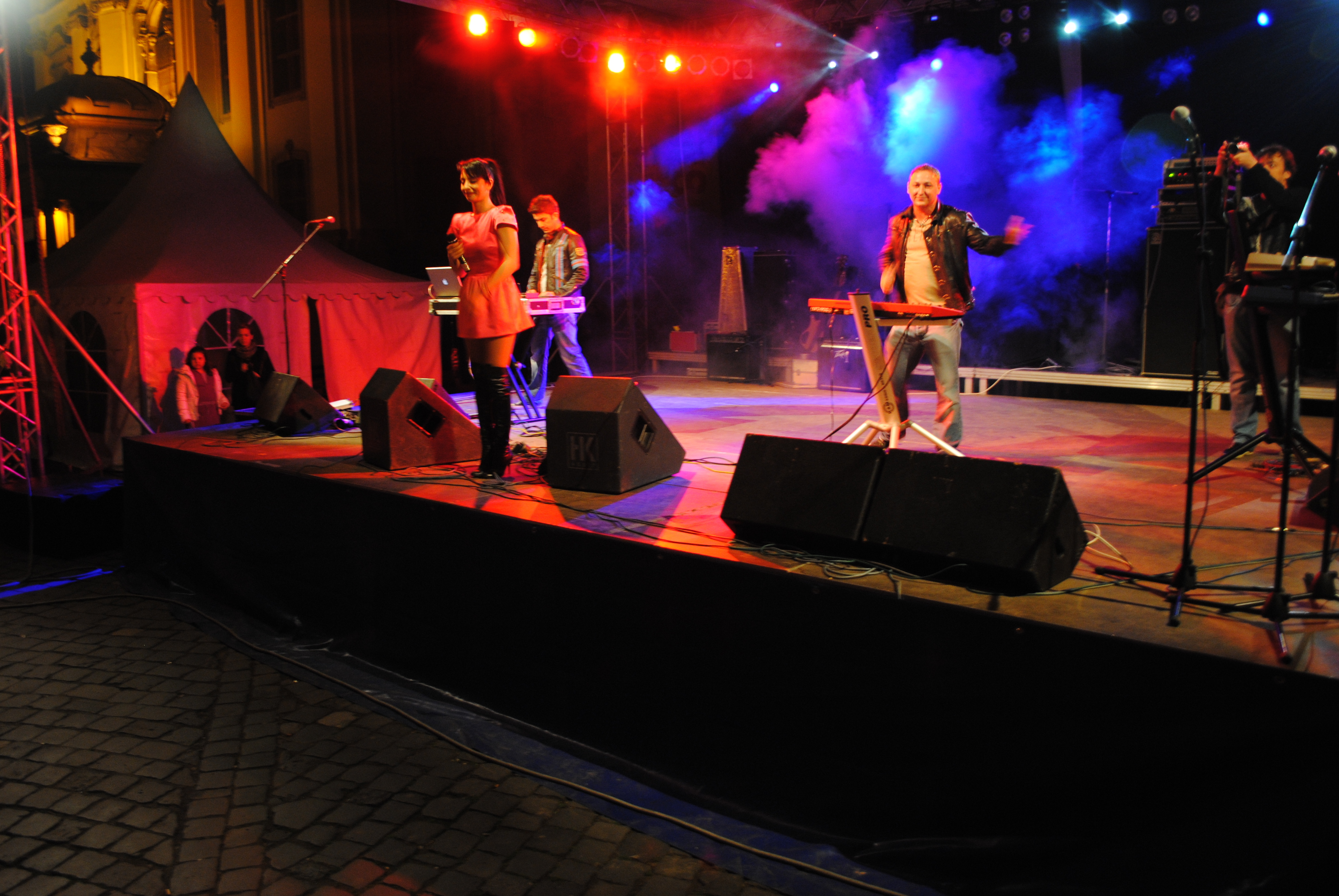
DJ Project in concert in Timișoara (9 May 2010)

DJ Project is a Romanian dance music group, initially consisting of producers Gino Manzotti (Handke Giuseppe) and DJ Maxx (Ovidiu Florea) along with singer Elena Baltagan. The group was formed in 2000 in Timișoara, with their first album, Experience, released in 2001.

At the MTV Europe Music Awards 2006, DJ Project were awarded with "Best Romanian Act" prize.

== Discography ==
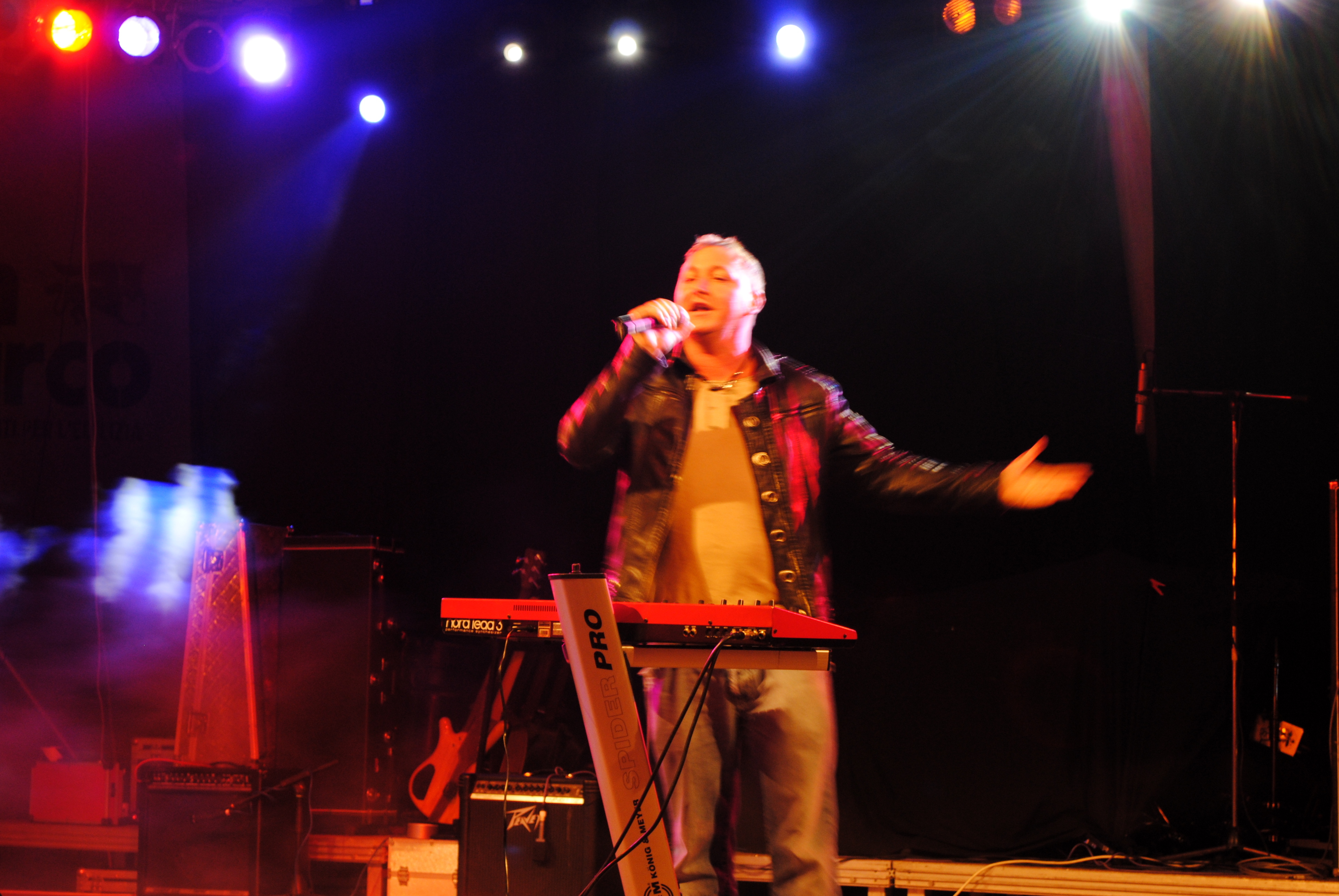
DJ Gino Manzotti

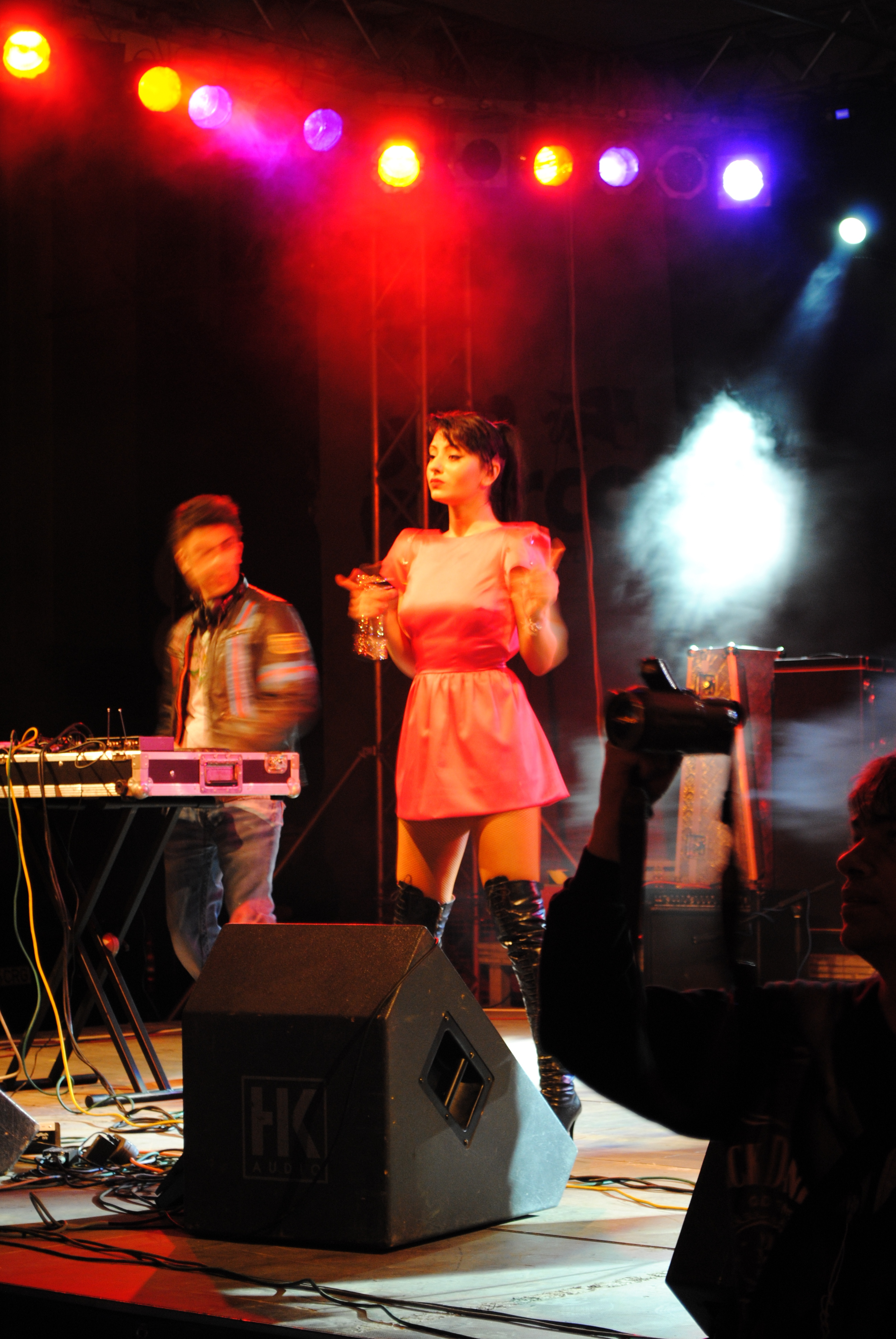
Giulia Anghelescu

=== Albums ===
- Experience (2001)
- Spune-mi tot ce vrei (Tell Me Everything You Want) (2002)
- Lumea ta (Your World) (2004)
- Șoapte (Whispers) (2005)
- Povestea mea (My Story) (2006)
- Două Anotimpuri (Two Seasons) (2007)
- Dj Project & Friends - In the club (2009)
- Best of (2011)
- Best of 15 ani (Best of: 15 Years) (2015)

=== Singles ===
- Te chem (I'm Calling You) (2002)
- Spune-mi tot ce vrei (Tell Me Everything You Want) (2002)
- Lumea ta (Your World) (2004)
- Printre vise (Among Dreams) (2004)
- Privirea ta (Your Gaze) (2005) #1 Romanian Top 100
- Șoapte (Whispers) (2005) #2 Romanian Top 100
- Încă o noapte (One More Night) (2006) #1 Romanian Top 100
- Ești tot ce am (You're All I Have) (2006)
- Before I Sleep (2007)
- Două anotimpuri (Two Seasons) (2007) #2 Romanian Top 100
- Lacrimi de înger (Angel Tears) (2007)
- Prima noapte (feat Giulia) (The First Night) (2008)
- Departe de noi (Far Away from Us) (2008)
- Hotel (2009)
- Over and Over Again (feat Deepside Deejays) (2009)
- Miracle Love (2009)
- Nu (feat Giulia) (No) (2009)
- Regrete (feat Giulia) (Regrets) (2010)
- Mi-e dor de noi (I Miss Us) (2011) #1 Romanian Top 100
- Crazy in Love (feat Giulia) (2012)
- Bun rămas (feat Adela) (Goodbye) (2012)
- Fără tine (feat Adela) (Without You) (2013)
- Suflet vândut (feat Adela) (A Sold Soul) (2014)
- Sevraj (feat Ela Rose) (Withdrawal) (2016)
- Ochii care nu se văd (feat Xenia Costinar) (Eyes That Can't See Themselves) (2016)
- Duminică (feat Elena Gheorghe) (Sunday) (2017)
- Omnia (feat Mira) (2017)
- Inimă nebună (feat Mira) (Crazy Heart) (2018)
- În locul meu (feat Theo Rose) (In My Place) (2019)
- 4 Camere (feat AMI) (4 Rooms) (2019)
- Retrograd (feat Andia) (Retrograde) (2019)
- Slăbiciuni (feat Andia) (Weaknesses) (2020)
- Parte din tine (feat Roxen) (Part of You) (2021)
- Cheia inimii mele (feat Mira) (The Key of My Heart) (2021)
- La timpul lor (feat Emaa) (In Their Time) (2022)
- Iubirea mea (feat Ana Baniciu) (My Love) (2022)
- Ochii tăi (feat Lidia Buble) (Your Eyes) (2022)
- Fulgul (feat Holy Molly) (The Snowflake) (2023)
- Numai Tu (feat ANNAIS) (Only You) (2023)
- Supranatural (feat Ioana Ignat) (2023)
- Privirea Ta (feat Alina Eremia) (Your Gaze) (2023)
- Am Vrut Să Te Sun (feat Ioana Ignat) (I Wanted to Call You) (2024)
- Nimic Mai Mult (feat Ioana Ignat) (Nothing More) (2024)
- Ultimul Sarut (feat JO) (2024)
- Gara de mai (feat PETRA) (2026)
