= Yves Larock =

Swiss DJ and record producer

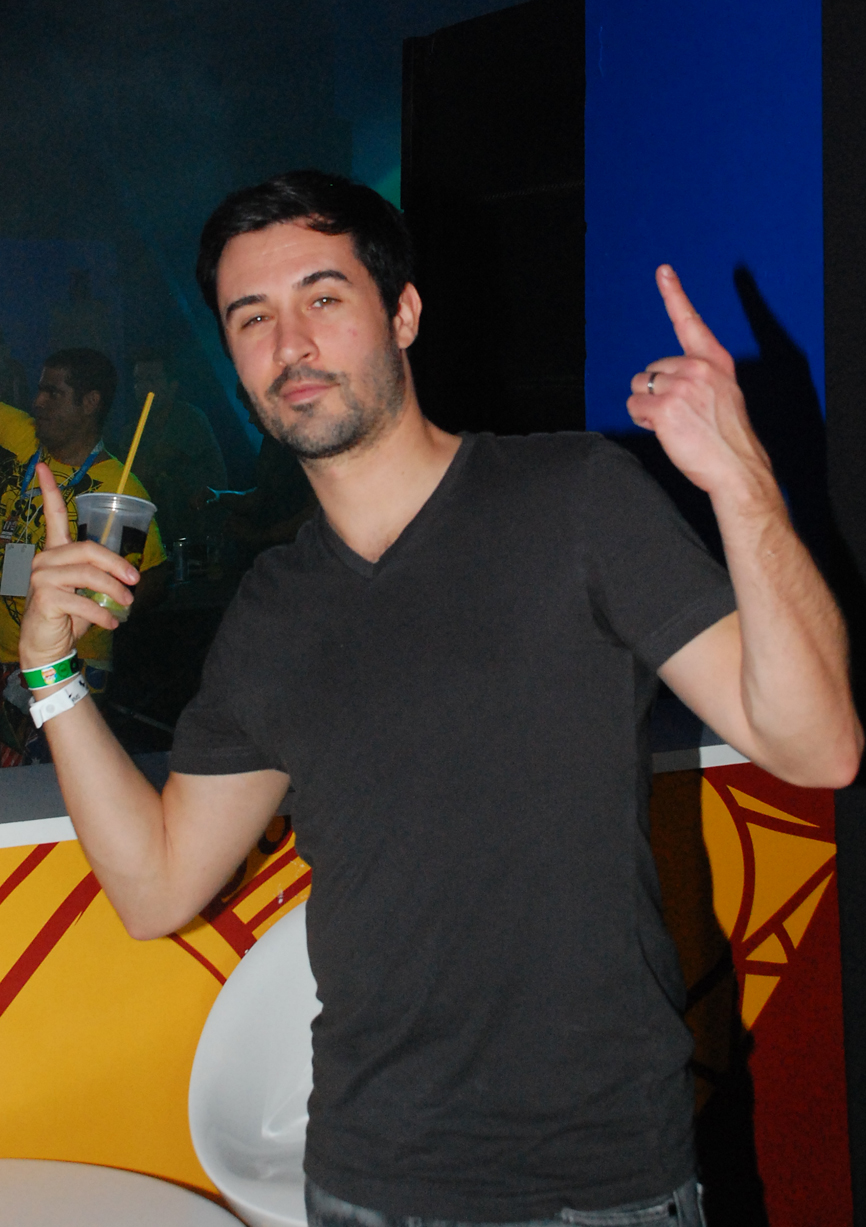
- Yves LaRock in 2012

Background information
- Born: Yves Cheminade; 18 July 1977 (age 49); Neuchâtel, Canton of Neuchâtel, Switzerland
- Origin: Neuchâtel, Switzerland
- Genre: House
- Occupations: Record producer, DJ
- Years active: 2002–present
- Labels: Millia Records (2009–present); ULM (2007–present); Data Records (2007–present); MAP Records (2004–2006); D:vision Records (2004–present); Outrage (2004); Royal Flush Records (2005); Mconvene (2006); Unlimited Sounds (2006); Ultra Records (2005–present)

Yves Cheminade (French pronunciation: [iv ʃəminad]; born 18 July 1977 in Neuchâtel), better known by the stage name Yves Larock (pronounced [iv laʁɔk]), is a Swiss DJ and record producer. He is a member of Africanism All Stars.

== Biography ==
His single "Rise Up", featuring vocals by Jaba from the Swiss reggae band Moonraisers, was a popular clubbing track throughout Europe and South Africa. It reached number 13 on the UK Singles Chart.

== Discography ==
=== Studio albums ===
Title	Details	Peak chart positions
Title	Details	SWI
Rise Up	Release date: 29 September 2008; Label: Sirup Music; Formats: CD	94
Manego	Release date: 12 October 2009; Label: Ministry of Sound; Formats: CD	—
Milky Way	Release date: 2011; Label: Ministry of Sound; Formats: CD	—
"—" denotes releases that did not chart

=== Singles ===
Year	Single	Peak chart positions									Album
Year	Single	AUS	BEL	FIN	FRA	GRE	NL	SWE	SWI	UK	Album
2005	"Zookey (Lift Your Leg Up)"	—	21	—	8	7	36	—	—	—	—
2007	"Rise Up" (featuring Jaba)	58	10	3	8	1	5	32	16	13	Rise Up
2008	"By Your Side" (featuring Jaba)	—	—	—	39	—	20	—	—	—	Rise Up
2008	"Say Yeah" (featuring Jaba)	—	—	—	—	—	26	—	—	—	Rise Up
2009	"Listen to the Voice Inside" (featuring Steve Edwards)	—	—	—	—	—	—	—	—	—	Manego
2020	"Here We Go" (with Bastian Baker)	—	—	—	—	—	—	—	50	—	TBA

=== EPs / Other singles ===
- 2004 : "Aiaka" (12") (Outrage)
- 2005 : "Yves Larock EP" (12" EP) (Map Dark)
- 2005 : "Red Dragon" (12") (Royal Flush Records)
- 2006 : "Losing Track of Time" with JD Davis (Mconvene)
- 2006 : "Something on Your Mind" with Discokidz (Unlimited Sounds)
- 2008 : "2008 Summer EP" (EP) (D:vision Records)
- 2010 : "Don't Turn Back" (D:vision Records)
- 2010 : "Respect" with Jaba (D:vision Records)
- 2010 : "Girl" (Remixes) with Tony Sylla vs. Tara McDonald (X-Energy Records)
- 2011 : "Milky Way" feat. Trisha (X-Energy Records)
- 2011 : "Million Miles" (Promo) (Universal Music)
- 2011 : "Running Man" with Jesus Luz feat. Liliana Almeida (Millia Records)
- 2011 : "If You're Lonely" with Cruzaders (Millia Records)
- 2011 : "The Zoo" (Millia Records)
- 2011 : "Viva Las Vegas" with Tony Sylla (Ego Music)
- 2011 : "Pan! Pan!" with Tony Sylla (Millia Records)
- 2012 : "Friday Is Dark / Tape" (Millia Records)
- 2012 : "Surrounded" with TonyT
- 2013 : "A Little - Carousel" (EP) (Millia Records)
- 2013 : "Needed to Know" (Millia Records)

=== Remixes ===
- 2002 : Dirty Rockerz - Let's Get Mad (Yves Larock Remix)
- 2005 : Dub Deluxe - Sex on Sax (Yves Larock 'n' Yann Remix)
- 2005 : Yves Cheminade (alias Yves Larock) - Vibenight (Yves Larock & Ludovic B Mix)
- 2006 : Major Boys vs. Kim Wilde - Friday Night Kids (Yves Larock Remix)
- 2006 : Tune Brothers - Serenata (Yves Larock 'n' Yann Remix)
- 2008 : Sunchasers - The Real Thing (Yves LaRock Remix)
- 2008 : JD Davis - Thrill Factor (World Cup 2008) (Yves Larock Dub Mix)
- 2009 : Cruzaders featuring Terri B - One Nation (Yves Larock Remix)
- 2009 : Rico Bernasconi - Hit the Dust (Yves Larock Remix)
- 2009 : Subdelux - Paparazzi (Yves Larock Club Edit)
- 2010 : Akcent - That's My Name (Yves Larock Radio Edit)
- 2010 : Guru Josh & Igor Blaska - Eternity (Yves Larock Remix)
- 2012 : House Republic - Nuggetz (Yves Larock Remix)
- 2013 : NERVO & Ivan Gough ft. Beverley Knight - Not Taking This No More (Yves Larock Remix)
