= Pacha Man =

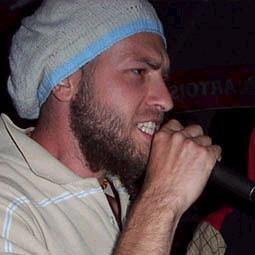

Background information
- Born: Călin Nicorici; 18 May 1975 (age 50); Timișoara, Timiș, Romania
- Origin: Timișoara
- Genres: Reggae; Reggae fusion Dancehall; Dub; Ragga; Rap
- Occupation: Musician
- Instrument: vocals
- Years active: 1997–present
- Labels: Rebel Music, Nova Music, Chill Brothers Records, HaHaHa Production
- Website: Facebook

Pacha Man (born Călin Nicorici, 18 May 1975 in Timișoara, Romania) is a reggae musician. He is one of the first Romanian artists to pursue a career as a reggae artist and the first to release a professionally produced album in this genre. He is well known for his aggressive style and trademark Patois-Romanian mixture approach to songwriting.

== Biography ==
Pacha Man was born in 1975 in Timișoara, Romania, the city where he also spent most of his childhood. His father emigrated to Canada in 1981, leaving a young Pacha Man with a diminishing interest in education and an eager wish to earn his existence. He followed his father's footsteps at the age of 14, in 1990, when he left for Canada, a country that would become his home for the next seven years while he also spent various amounts of time in New York and Miami. He got his start in writing lyrics and making music while observing the African immigrants' habits in Canada and the United States. He returned to Romania in 1997, father of one with his first wife, a Colombian immigrant he met while living in Canada. He also studied law for 3 years in New York.

=== Career ===
In the 1990s Romania, a country that had just overthrown its communist dictatorship, witnessed an explosion of popular music from Western culture as the youth quickly gained its access to information. The hip hop industry was at an all-time high by the time Pacha Man returned to Romania in 1997. He started emceeing in a club in his native Timișoara and quickly gained the public's attention for his innovative and refreshing style. One of his Timișoara friends was a club disk jockey going by the name of DJ Angelo. He suggested Pacha Man, derived from the Turkish military rank pasha, would be perfect as a stage name for the 21-year-old Nicorici, as he drew a considerable female audience in his early years. He recorded and released his debut album, Globul De Cristal (The Crystal Globe) in 1998 and, although the album was an independent, self-produced material, it created enough buzz around Pacha Man, enabling him to set many contacts in the Romanian music industry. He collaborated with hip hop veterans B.U.G. Mafia on their 2000 album Întotdeauna pentru totdeauna and in 2002 signed with hip hop powerhouse Rebel Music. While on Rebel Music, he released his second album, Drumul Către Rastafari (The Road To Rastafari), one of the highest regarded reggae albums ever released in Romania. The album was supported by the hit single "Acelaşi Sânge" (The Same Blood), a reggae-style social protest that catapulted him to superstardom. In 2004 he left Rebel Music and released his third album, Contra Curentului (Against The Stream), in 2006 via Nova Music. Zale member and producer Jaques Yolo produced the supporting single of the album, "Crazy," making his affiliation with the band's label, Chill Brothers Records, public. He signed with Chill Brothers Records in 2007, but has since left the label without releasing any new material.

Pacha Man was also chosen by Disney Channel Romania to perform songs for the Romanian dub of the American animated series Phineas and Ferb.

== Discography ==
- Globul De Cristal (The Crystal Globe) (1998)
- Drumul Către Rastafari (The Road To Rastafari) (2003)
- Contra Curentului (Against The Stream) (2006)

== See also ==
- Romanian hip hop
