= Probe Audio =

Studio album by Guess Who
- Released: April 26, 2009 (standard); December 8, 2009 (Locul Potrivit/Probe Audio)
- Recorded: 2007–2009
- Studio: Okapi Sound Studio (Bucharest, Romania)
- Genre: Hip hop
- Length: 41:06; 52:17 (Locul Potrivit/Probe Audio disc)
- Label: Okapi Sound, Cat Music
- Producer: Agresiv, Grasu XXL, Sez, RazOne, Guess Who

Guess Who chronology
Probe Audio (2009)	Tot Mai Sus (2011)

Locul Potrivit/Probe Audio cover

Singles from Probe Audio
- 1. "Tu (feat. Spike)" Released: February 21, 2009; 2. "Eu Gen (feat. Tiberiu Popovici)" Released: October 23, 2009

Singles from Locul Potrivit/Probe Audio
- 1. "Locul Potrivit" Released: December 8, 2009

Probe Audio (Sound Check) is the debut solo album from Romanian rapper Guess Who. It was produced by Agresiv, Sez and other producers and released April 25, 2009 by Okapi Sound in Romania. It was re-released as Locul Potrivit/Probe Audio by Cat Music on December 8, 2009 in Romania including three new tracks and a remix and remains one of the most critically acclaimed hip hop albums in Romania.

== Background ==
=== Conception ===
After departing from Paraziţii's 20 CM Records in 2007 and taking a break from recording with his own group, Anonim, Guess Who immediately moved on to record his own album. Teaming up with Agresiv, a duo of Bucharest-based producers, he started working extensively on new tracks with a rather unconventional approach. In 2007 a collective of musicians and artists came together under the name "Okapi Sound" with the purpose of collaborating, including Romanian hip hop veterans such as Maximilian of Mahsat or Grasu XXL of XXL & 10 Grei. Guess Who recorded his album during a number of sessions in the independent Okapi Studio in Bucharest. The album received a fair share of production credited to Agresiv, with appearances by established artists such as Grasu XXL, Paraziţii's DJ Freakadadisk or longtime collaborators Spike and Griffo and newcomers like Lucia Dumitrescu or JJ, who provided vocals for eight of the album's fourteen tracks. Guess Who spoke on meeting and working with Agresiv in an Internet interview:

Spike kept telling me "Go see Agresiv, go see Agresiv ..." so I met them, we even started a studio and we reached a conclusion that since we have a studio, let's do some work, that's how we started Okapi and the whole gang."

=== Music and lyrics ===
Anonim had repeatedly been criticized by Romanian hip hop fans of having a style that resembled Paraziţii too much, providing little innovation in an already monotone music scene. Even though he kept the ironic attitude towards approaching his subjects, he moved on to more serious social issues such as living in a post communist country that had seemed to have lost its values, violence, poverty or drug abuse. Focusing on the hardships of life in Romania as well as criticizing the Romanian political system, Guess Who became an acknowledged voice for the post-communist Romanian generation.

With socio-political conscious themes abounding throughout the album, Guess Who speaks of the numerous problems that impoverish the Romanian society and constantly observes a number of socio-political issues such as corruption in the Romanian political system, lack of interest by Romanian authorities in helping the younger generations and the new values and interests that seized the Romanian society after the fall of communism and the liberalization of the economical market. On "Flori Ilegale" (Illegal Flowers), he takes an inquisitive stance in approaching the newly developed drug habits of the younger Romanian population while speaking about his own problems with marijuana abuse. Even though the track was leaked onto the Internet a year and a half earlier than the album's official release, it was highly acclaimed and has been referenced numerous times by various Romanian artists.

"Flori Ilegale"
from Probe Audio

Guess Who also references his issues with marijuana on the album's lead single, "Tu" (You), where, over an Agresiv reggae-funk infused beat he shares the songwriting with longtime collaborator Spike. The song depicts the duo's bizarre adventures while smoking marijuana as they go through various mental states, from anxiety and relaxation to being close to having a panic attack as they get pulled over by the police and, although the track seems to actually stand as an anti-drug ode, as they describe their weird and unpleasant sensations they experience while being intoxicated, it appears to have caught on with the Romanian audience for the sole reason it references drug abuse.

On Eu Gen, a Romanian play of words referencing the extensive use of the word "gen" (a Romanian version of the English colloquial word "like") by Romanian adolescents and the Romanian name Eugen he ironizes the archetypical Romanian young male of the late 2000s by creating an obnoxious, shallow and annoying fictional character named Eugen, portrayed by Romanian stand up comedian Tiberiu Popovici, who insists on being ironic and laid back even though he is secretly ridiculed by the people he comes in contact with. The song was released as the album's second single and the music video depicted Eugen going around the city putting up a facade to impress his peers and the women he meets as he ends up being slapped when he tries to make an impression of a hip hop dancer. The single had less critical and commercial success than "Tu" (You) but Guess Who started a campaign against social shallowness in Romania using the character.

After "A Doua Oara" (The Second Time), a laid-back collaboration with Grasu XXL that depicts the various promises an individual makes to himself after undergoing various unpleasant experiences, Guess Who unfolds a soulful story about a young married couple who desperately try to survive and provide for their children in the Romanian society through the perspective of the male counterpart of the relationship over a jazz-influenced, Agresiv-produced instrumental. The sped up sample of Romanian singer Anca Agemolu's 1960s song "Aici" (Here) provides for the contrast between the positive and uplifting chorus and the dark, gritty lyrics. Jazz and soul influences are recurrent throughout the album's beats, contributing to Guess Who's successful and innovative style of songwriting.

A fair share of the album's tracks are dedicated to the artist's new approach of interpersonal relationships. A dark piano riff on "Eu, Tu Si Restu' ..." (Me, You And The Rest ...) plays as Guess Who examines a complicated relationship with a woman with whom he has grown apart to the point that he finds her presence highly irritating while JJ provides the background vocals. Much like "Ca Doua Flori", the song's chorus is written in a different key than the rest of the lyrics, again creating a strong contrast as Guess Who browses through extremely diverse feelings. The track also contains a sample of the highly acclaimed Cristian Nemescu film Marilena from P7, featuring one of the characters expressing his beliefs that all women are materialists who only use men to achieve personal goals. Guess Who further discusses the topic on "Special", a collaboration with pop singer Lucia Dumitrescu. Under the appearance of a jazzy love song he cynically renders romance useless when dealing with women only interested in material values as he applies reverse psychology and tells such a woman everything she wants to hear for the sole purpose of having sex with her. The album's ninth track, "De Urgenta" (Emergency), runs a little over two minutes and, though only an elaborate skit, it appears to be the female counteroffensive to the misogynistic tone of "Eu, Tu Si Restu' ..." (Me, You And The Rest ...) and "Special". It features Guess Who singing a few words over a multi-layered guitar track and a sample of Romanian actress Iulia Marcov in character viciously cursing at men in the 2006 short film "Amatorul" (The Amateur). This technique is reminiscent of Ice Cube's "It's a Man's World" from his 1990 solo effort Amerikkka's Most Wanted where, together with rapper Yo-Yo, he engages in a hip hop battle of the sexes. A personal friend of Guess Who, credited on the album cover as Mircea "Ciulikă" Ştefan performs a monologue about financial difficulties and contemporary life in Romania on the thirteenth track, "In Viata Mea" (In My Life). Swedish producer RazOne contributes to the song's instrumental, as credited in the album's liner notes.

The album ends with the soul-funk influenced song "Nicio Grija" (No Worries), produced by the Galaţi-based producer Sez with additional contributions by Agresiv. Guess Who unfolds his general views on life, music and social status on what seems to be the most sincere track of the album while urging the listeners to relax and put aside their personal frustrations. The song was carefully selected to be the last on the album as it serves to an honest and pragmatic ending. Guess Who later stated in an interview that this was his favorite song off Probe Audio.

== Release and promotion ==
After Guess Who left Paraziţii's 20 CM Records and started working on new material, he leaked "Flori Ilegale" (Illegal Flowers) and "Eu, Tu Si Restu' ..." (Me, You And The Rest ...) on the Internet and, after receiving positive reviews, he announced the album for a 2007 release. In spite of this, the production process underwent several difficulties forcing him to delay this release for over two years. In March 2009 he started a personal website and a blog to allow him easier communication with his fans and apologized for the repeated pushbacks of the album stating that he would release it shortly. After releasing the Agresiv-produced single "Tu" (You) in February 2009, the album was made available on April 26, 2009 via his official website. The CDs were originally mailed to customers through the Romanian Post but after experiencing various problems, the delivery method was changed to a private shipping company to enable fans to receive merchandise faster. Two weeks before the album was made available to retail, a number of unfinished songs were leaked onto the Internet, contributing to the album's highly anticipated status amongst Romanian hip hop fans.

Promotion was done independently and exclusively on the Internet for the first version of the album and despite this it sold over two thousand copies in the first weeks of availability. This attracted interest by the Romanian TV music channel 1Music who started airing the album's lead single "Tu" (You). On YouTube, the music video for Tu (You) was accessed by over 120,000 viewers. In late 2009 Guess Who signed a contract with the Romanian music label Cat Music who distributed a new version of "Probe Audio" together with the sports newspaper Gazeta Sporturilor (The Sports Newspaper in Romanian). The re-release of the album included three new tracks and a remix to the album's second single "Eugen" and also the video for the third single "Locul Potrivit" (The Right Place). Cat Music's interest in Guess Who was stimulated by Romanian radio stations that started airing "Locul Potrivit" after radio host Şerban Huidu discovered the song on the Internet and aired it on Kiss FM during his morning show. Guess Who promoted his albums in a series of interviews and radio ads in the Romanian media throughout 2009.

== Locul Potrivit/Probe Audio ==
In late 2009 a new song by Guess Who surfaced on the Internet in Romania, receiving a consistent amount of positive feedback. The track's original name was Anul 2000 (The Year 2000) but he later changed it as he stated the "Anul 2000" brand was registered in Romania and thus, not available for free public use. The song was discovered by Romanian radio host Şerban Huidu and he gave high praise to the track's original and intelligent lyrical delivery as he started promoting it on Kiss FM. Shortly afterwards, many other radio stations started airing the song, creating a new buzz around Guess Who and also sparking interest from Romanian music labels. He eventually signed with Cat Music for a one-album deal similar to fellow hip hop acts B.U.G. Mafia and Puya, who also released their albums with Romania's largest sports newspaper at the time, Gazeta Sporturilor to boost their cd sales. Locul Potrivit/Probe Audio included the re-release's lead single "Locul Potrivit" (The Right Place), two other new tracks, amongst which a collaboration with Romanian reggae group Camuflaj and a remix of the original album's second single "Eugen".

"Locul Potrivit"
from Probe Audio

"Locul Potrivit" was the single meant to promote the re-release of "Probe Audio" being officially released on December 8, 2009 with a music video directed by Marian Crişan depicting Guess Who's friends and collaborators with protest signs such as "Nu ne-am nascut in locul potrivit" (We weren't born in the right place) or "Ne vedem in anul 3000" (See you in the year 3000), Romanian gymnast Laura Cristache performing some routines as a reference to Romania's underfunded sports system and children dressed as young communists singing the socialist adulation-styled sample of Horia Moculescu's 1977 song "Noi În Anul 2000" (Us In The Year 2000) in the beginning of the song. The track casts a critical view upon the Romanian society and its post-communist flaws as Guess Who expresses his wish of being born in a different place.

"Viseaza" (Dream) is a ragga-influenced collaboration with Romanian reggae act Camuflaj. Bucharest-based duo Agresiv produced the downtempo, reggae-funk infused instrumental and, as Guess Who sings his way through the chorus with lyrics about marijuana consumption and general considerations about life in general, Camuflaj complete the song with a soulful and conscious approach in discussing the use of cannabis in stress-related issues.

"07.03.2006" (March 7, 2006) is one of the album's darkest and most introspective tracks. Guess Who shares his thoughts on various subjects, generally related to contemporary life in Romania such as Traian Băsescu being elected president, alcohol and drug abuse in high school, the concern that his financial income is very limited as a Romanian hip hop artist and describes the next day, March 8th, as an opportunity for materialist women to show their flaws. Even though the main themes of the song are the general monotony and repetitive patterns of life that lure him into deep depression and angoisse, it also proves to be one of the darkest depictions of life as a Romanian in the mid to late 2000s.

"Locul Potrivit/Probe Audio" was highly anticipated by the Romanian audience and was bootlegged very fast, only a couple of hours after its release with Gazeta Sporturilor. Guess Who spoke about this re-release in a 2009 interview with the Monden.Info website:

The album was initially released exclusively online and it reached few people and I thought it was a good ideea to re-release it with Gazeta Sporturilor to reach as many people as possible, keeping in mind that the price is going to be reasonable. It's going to include four new tracks and the music video for "Locul Potrivit".

== Critical reception ==
The album has received generally positive reviews from critics and although he released his first official song in 2003 on a Rebel Music compilation, Guess Who established a reputation as a new, talented artist after the release of this album. Most critics have noted the contrast between the album's dark and sober production and Guess Who's witty and humorous addressing of his themes while managing to remain serious-minded enough to avoid a completely comical approach. Dan Lucian Stefancu of "Deceblog" has noted Guess Who's ability to use the Internet in his own favor saying, "Hip hop artists were the ones to understand the Internet and have taken full advantage of it. The music video for Tu [the album's first single] has gathered over 100,000 views on YouTube and 66,000 on Vimeo".

Mihdel of DivercityCafe also reviewed this album saying, "Probe Audio has been produced by Agresiv and Guess Who, it includes 14 tracks having a strong message to send in its raw lyrics with their ironic approach that emphasize on a more melodic interpretation. I think it's not only a hip hop album, but really more than that.".

The Romanian hip hop community has also extensively covered this album in their online debates on Internet forums, such as Hades Records or Hiphopkulture. The reception amongst fans has also been generally positive, emphasizing on the album's jazzy production and socio-political lyrical themes.

== Commercial performance ==
Album sales have dramatically dropped in Romania after the Internet gained widespread availability in the mid-2000s. This led to a situation where most labels avoided signing any new hip hop acts, since the Internet bootlegging would practically impair any possibility to move units. Guess Who has claimed on his official blog that the album received over 1,000 pre-orders in the first week it was made available for sell on the official website. Since it was an independent release, no other official data has been made available by the artist or his legal representation. After he signed with Cat Music to re-release the album with Gazeta Sporturilor (The Sports Newspaper), the label has said that the request for the album has been so high that an additional number of discs had to be manufactured and sent out.

== Track listing ==
All song titles, notes, samples, writing and production credits are according to the album booklet.

Lyrics by Guess Who, Griffo, Spike, Mitza, Grasu XXL, Camuflaj, music compositions listed below.

No.	Title	Producer(s)	Length
1.	"Fuck Ce Vreau"	Guess Who	2:11
2.	"Unu Doi" (featuring Freakadadisk and Griffo)	Agresiv	2:52
3.	"Tu" (featuring Spike)	Agresiv	3:27
4.	"Gen" (featuring Tiberiu Popovici)	Agresiv	1:49
5.	"Flori Ilegale"	Agresiv	2:56
6.	"A Doua Oara" (featuring Grasu XXL)	Ansane	3:06
7.	"Ca Doua Flori"	Agresiv, keyboards by Stefan	2:51
8.	"Special (Remix)"	Grasu XXL	3:02
9.	"De Urgenta"	Agresiv	2:16
10.	"Eu, Tu Si Restu..." (Additional vocals by JJ)	Agresiv	4:17
11.	"Sunete" (featuring Mitza, additional Vocals by Florin a.k.a. "Crocodilaru")	Agresiv	3:31
12.	"Special" (featuring Lucia Dumitrescu)	Agresiv	2:41
13.	"In Viata Mea" (vocals by Mircea "Ciulikă" Ştefan)	RazOne, additional production by Agresiv	3:07
14.	"Nici o Grija" (additional & background vocals by Lucia Dumitrescu)	Sez, additional production by Agresiv	3:32

=== Locul Potrivit/Probe Audio ===
No.	Title	Producer(s)	Length
1.	"Locul Potrivit"	Agresiv, co-produced by George Hora	2:55
2.	"Gen (Agresiv Remix)"	Agresiv	2:58
3.	"Viseaza" (featuring Camuflaj)	Agresiv	3:18
4.	"07.03.2006"	Agresiv	3:11
5.	"Fuck Ce Vreau"	Guess Who	2:11
6.	"Unu Doi" (featuring Freakadadisk and Griffo)	Agresiv	2:52
7.	"Tu" (featuring Spike)	Agresiv	3:27
8.	"Gen" (featuring Tiberiu Popovici)	Agresiv	1:49
9.	"Flori Ilegale"	Agresiv	2:56
10.	"A Doua Oara" (featuring Grasu XXL)	Ansane	3:06
11.	"Ca Doua Flori"	Agresiv, keyboards by Stefan	2:51
12.	"Special (Remix)"	Grasu XXL	3:02
13.	"De Urgenta"	Agresiv	2:16
14.	"Eu, Tu Si Restu..." (Additional vocals by JJ)	Agresiv	4:17
15.	"Sunete" (featuring Mitza, additional vocals by Florin a.k.a. "Crocodilaru")	Agresiv	3:31
16.	"Special" (featuring Lucia Dumitrescu)	Agresiv	2:41
17.	"In Viata Mea" (vocals by Mircea "Ciulikă" Ştefan)	RazOne, additional production by Agresiv	3:07
18.	"Nici o Grija" (additional & background vocals by Lucia Dumitrescu)	Sez, additional production by Agresiv	3:32

=== Personnel ===
- Laurențiu "Guess Who" Mocanu – vocals
- Paul "Spike" Maracine – vocals on "Tu" (You)
- Petre "Freakadadisk" Urda – scratches on "Unu Doi" (One Two)
- Griffo – vocals on "Unu Doi" (One Two)
- Clique – vocals on "Viseaza" (Dream)
- Mr.Oneshot – vocals on "Viseaza" (Dream)
- George Hora – co-producer for "Locul Potrivit" (The Right Place)
- Vlad Octavian Lucan – keyboards, mixing and additional programming
- Mihai "Mitză" Ghidarcea – keyboards, mixing, drum programming and vocals on "Sunete" (Sounds)
- Dragoş "Grasu XXL" Nichifor – vocals on "A Doua Oară" (The Second Time), producer for "Special" (Remix)
- Ioana "JJ" Oegar – additional & background vocals on "Eu, Tu si Restu' ..." (Me, You and The Rest ...)
- Tiberiu Popovici – vocals on "Eu Gen"
- Florin a.k.a. "Crocodilaru" – additional vocals on "Sunete" (Sounds)
- Mircea "Ciulikă" Ştefan – vocals on "În Viaţa Mea" (In My Life)
- Lucia Dumitrescu – chorus vocals on "Special", additional & background vocals on "Nici o Grija"
- RazOne – producer for "În Viaţa Mea"
- Liviu "Sez" Pirvu – producer for "Nici O Grija"
- Dan "Dax" Nedelcu – saxophone
