= Andreea Raicu =

Romanian television presenter

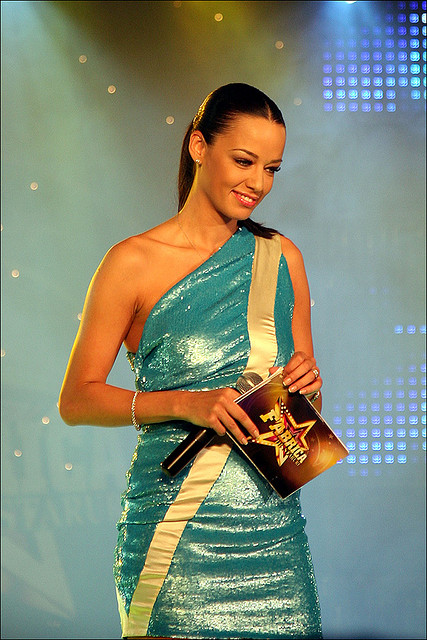
- Born: 18 July 1977 (age 49); Bucharest, Romania
- Presenting career
- Show: Big Brother 1 (Romania)
- Station: Prima TV
- Country: Romania
- Website: http://www.andreearaicu.ro/

Andreea Raicu (born 18 July 1977) is a Romanian television host presenter and model. She debuted as a model, winning several important modeling contests, then entered television where she established herself by presenting important entertainment shows such as Big Brother and Megastar.

== Biography ==
Andreea Raicu debuted on television in 1996, after a year before she would come to the attention of the media when she won 1st place at the national final "Elite Model Look" and the "Best Elegance" prize "Elite Model Look" organized in Seoul, thus becoming the first Romanian awarded with such a prize.

She started her career in television at PRO TV, where she presented, alternately, "7 o'clock, Good morning" (1996 - 1997) and "Pro fashion". Since 2000, she has been a star of Prima TV.

In 2009, Andreea Raicu debuted in the world of film, accepting the challenge to play a leading role in the series "Efect 30", broadcast on Prima TV.

== Television shows presented ==
- "7 o'clock, Good Morning" - PRO TV (1996 – 1997)
- "Pro fashion" - PRO TV
- "Style" - Prima TV (2000 - 2001)
- "Class Reunion" (2001 - 2002)
- "Big Brother" - Prima TV (both editions March–July 2003 / March–June 2004)
- "Everything for you"
- "What Girls Want" (2003 - 2005)
- "Always Friends" (2005)
- "Versus" (2006)
- "Megastar" - Prima TV (2006 - 2008)
- "Star Factory" - Prima TV (2009)
- "Date in the Dark" (2010)
- "School of good manners" (2010)
- "Miss girl from the country" - Prima TV (2010-2011)
- "My boy from the country" - Prima TV (2010)
- "Miss girl from the country" - Prima TV (2010-2011)
- "My boy from the country" - Prima TV (2011)
- "Miss girl from the country - season 2 and 3" - Prima TV (2011)

== Awards ==
- 1st place, National Finals "Elite Model Look" and "Best Elegance" Award, "International Elite Model Look" in Seoul (1995)
- "Successful Women of the Year - Sexiest TV Star" Award

(2004)

- Award for "The most elegant female star" - Tops Viva!
- 1st place, in the ranking of "The most publicized female television stars", tied with Andreea Marin, Top Story magazine
- The Elle Style Awards ELLE STYLE AWARDS - "Style Icon" Award (2013)
