= Grasu XXL =

Romanian singer (born 1981)

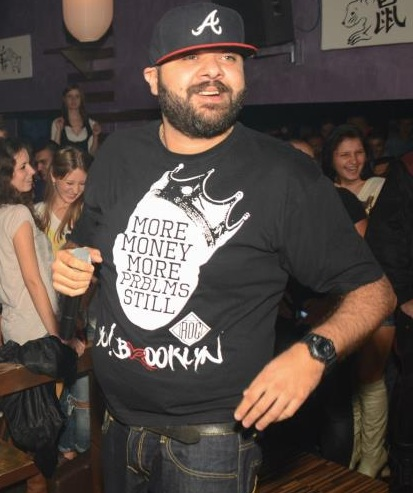
- Grasu XXL in October 2012

Background information
- Born: Dragoș Nechifor; 11 August 1981 (age 45); Buhuși, Bacău County, Romania
- Genre: Hip hop
- Occupations: Rapper; singer; songwriter; record producer
- Years active: 1995–present
- Labels: Okapi Sound; Casa Productions; Music Expert Records; HaHaHa Production; Cat Music; Universal Music Romania
- Partner: Laura Andreșan (2008–2020)
- Children: 1

Dragoș Nechifor (Romanian pronunciation: [draˈ goʃˈ neˈ kiˈ for]; born 11 August 1981) better known by his stage name Grasu XXL (Fatty XXL), is a Romanian singer, rapper, songwriter and producer. He is one of the founders of Romanian record label Okapi Sound since 2007. Nichifor is a two-time recipient of a Romanian Music Awards prize and a one-time nominee at the MTV Europe Music Awards for the Best Romanian Act.

== Early life ==
Nichifor was born on August 11, 1981, in Buhuși, Bacău County. At the age of 13 he lost both his parents. He has been singing since the age of 14, coming from a Roma ethnicity family with a tradition in the field. He invested in music since 1994. He started by frequently travelling to Bucharest, struggling to pay for his train to reach the studio.

== Musical career ==
=== Beginnings and early collaborations ===
The singer's first recording material was called Personajul negativ (Badguy) (1999) and was a collaboration with fellow singer Paco 10 Grei. The two were briefly united under the band name of XXL & 10 Grei. The material was released on July 10, 1999, by Cat Music label and also features various collaborations with artists such as Tataee from B.U.G. Mafia, Roxana, Maximilian, Mahsat and Kiper. A track from the official tracklist of the album in collaboration with singer Roxana named "Privesc de sus in sus" (I look upper) was the only single to feature a video. At the beginning of 2004, the Nichifor went to Italy together with Maximilian.

==== First solo album - Curaj (2006) ====
His first solo album, Curaj (Courage), was released in July 2006, remarking itself through original material, both in sound and performance. With this material, he wanted to take the Romanian hip-hop out of the "neighborhood patterns". The album was produced by Tataee and Caddy of B.U.G. Mafia (executive producers) and was recorded, mixed and mastered at the Ines Sound and Video label in Bucharest. The material enjoyed a lot of success, mainly through singles such as Curaj (Courage) and Fără Filtru (No filter). The latter song featured a remix made by Mari of M&G, Maximilian and Paco. In 2009, rapper Guess Who performed a cover of the song known as Flori Ilegale (Illegal flowers). All the 13 songs on the album are in collaboration with at least an artist, featuring singers such as DJ Swamp, Bitză, Mari, Houdini and Maximiian of Mahsat, Paco 10 Grei, Queen Bee, Mario, Artan, Uzzi of la B.U.G. Mafia și Villy. In 2006, the EP "Courage (Remix)" album appears, being another material released by Nichifor together with DJ Swamp to promote the album with the same name together with the mixtape "Evident" released in 2007 with Swamp. The latter features tracks remixed by Swamp, Agresiv, Motzu and Villy which hinted Nichifor's forthcoming album called Oameni (People) which was going to be released in 2010.

=== Okapi Sound label and later career ===
"It's my first song in English. I enjoyed writing lyrics and everyone I collaborated with was supportive. The song is one of love - as I understand this feeling. I really enjoy collaborating with people I love and appreciate: Alex, Smiley, Baxter and the whole HaHaHa Production team. They are all my friends and it was only natural that our friendship would materialize in music at some point. By the way, there is also a song on the album featuring Smiley called "Prinde-ne bă dacă poți!" (Catch us if you can).

— Nichifor about the song "Turnin'" and his collaborations with HaHaHa Production.

In 2007, Nichofor founded the "Okapi Sound" music production company together with Agresiv, Guess Who, Paco, Maximilian, Spike and Tranda. The rapper's second solo album was supposed to come out in 2007, although poor quality management made the album wait. Also in 2007, more precisely in the summer of this year, the artist went with Laura Andreșan on the "Forbidden" tour, which included dance performances and erotic shows with live music. The concert tour named after the XXX reality show from Romanian television channel B1 TV started on July 28, 2007, in the Yellow Submarine club in Craiova and included 5 more cities: Arad, Buzău, Cluj, Costinești and Bucharest. In addition to these, a party was also organized in honor of the rapper (on the occasion of his birthday) at Club President in Câmpina with him stating the following: "Adela, my dancer, also prepared a special number, obviously an erotic one, something with a lot of cream on bare skin. She didn't tell nothing more. She performed on one of my first songs 'Zi-mi pe nume' (Say my name)".

==== Second solo album - Oameni. Making of and release. (2008-2010) ====
In 2008, the video for the song "Ar fi timpul" (It's time) was released. It was made by the Ador Media team led by director Alex Ceaușu. The song is the second single from Tonik Obiektiv's album with the same name, a collaboration with Mario. It was shot between 11 and 13 October 2008 in Bucharest. On July 22, 2009, the video of the song "Pizda la volan" (Pussy behind the wheel) directed by Alex Ceaușu, a collaboration between Nichifor and rapper Maximilian, appears on the latter's official website. The filming for the second single from Maximilian's album entitled Volumu' la Maxim...ilian!!! took place on, with Guess Who, Agresiv, Spike, Junky, JJ and Motzu attending the video shoot. A day later, on July 23, 2009, Nichifor's official site announces the appearance of the video of the first single promoting the rapper's second solo album, "Oameni" (People). The track is called "Prea mult fum" (Too Much Smoke) and is a collaboration with rapper Mitza from Agresiv. The video of the song was directed by Spike, with several members of Okapi Sound being present at the filming: Guess Who, Maximilian, Motzu, JJ but also Laura Andreșan, who appears in the clip in an inscribed tank top with the slogan "Free Gigi" (a slang call for the legalization of marijuana). Filmed on May 16, 2009, in the hall in the area of the Republica metro station, close to the eastern outskirts of Bucharest, the video relies heavily on special effects and 3D frames, illustrating a dizzying evening in a club, when all objects turn into smoke, the scenery being created on calculator by Spike.

The album's release was also pushed back to September 24, 2009. On November 2, 2009, the second single from the upcoming album "Turnin'", a collaboration with Alex Velea, was set to be released on the Romanian reality TV show "Muzica Ta" hosted by Marian Soci and Cristi Stanciu on Radio 21. The song was released by HaHaHa Production with the lyrics being written by Nichifor himself, the chorus made by Smiley and the instrumental made by Dj Cellblock. There is a remix made for the song, and released by Agresiv in October the same year. It was included on the mixtape Ap. 71. The music video of the single was released on December 16, 2009, on MTV Romania. It was filmed on November 24, 2009, at Atlantis studios and was directed by Iulian Moga. Other artists from Nichifor's Okapi Sound label such as Aggressive, Maximilian, Guess Who, Spike and JJ also participated at filming. Also on Radio 21, on November 4, 2009, the video of Nichifor's song in collaboration with Deepside Deejays and Alex Velea entitled "Around the World" was released. Filming took place at Atlantis Studios on October 1, 2009, was directed by Iulian Moga and featured Agresiv and Spike, each artist filming in a different setting. According to information provided by Romania online publication "Monden.info", the album "Oameni" was allegedly planned to be released at the end of 2009, although plans have changed.

The third single from the album "Oameni" entitled "Azi nu" (Not today) and was a collaboration with Guess Who. The song was uploaded online on 25 February 2010, and the music video was released on the night of May 27 to 28 on Kiss TV and later also appeared on YouTube. The song was written in 2007, although the musician have had the song in his mind since 1999. The music is signed by band Agresiv, the lyrics were composed by Nichifor himself alongside Guess Who, and the music video was directed by Marian Crișan, who worked with Guess Who in the fall of 2009 on the music video for the latter's single "Locul Potrivit" (The right place). Filming took place on April 29, 2010, at the Romanian seaside, in the village of Corbu near the township of Năvodari, started at sunrise and ended at sunset. In addition to the two rappers, Spike also appears in the video together with the rappers from Agresiv (Vlad and Mitza).

==== 2010 Tournees ====
On February 26, 2010, Nichior and fellow artist Maximilian started in a mini national tour, which was supposed to include three cities: Botoșani, Piatra Neamț and Iași). Only the people from Botoșani could enjoy the concert of the two artists, because the last two were cancelled. Although Maxi and Grasu held sound tests on February 27 in Piatra Neamț, they found out that the organizers they will not pay them. Thus, the concert in Iasi was also cancelled.

==== Other hits and collaborations ====
On June 14, 2010, the video directed by Andrei Stăruială for the song "Gândul poate ucide (Thought can kill)" appeared on the Bravo magazine website, a collaboration with artist Skizzo Skills. Filmed on chroma on October 18, 2009, the clip was also shown in the Tan Tan club in Bucharest on December 18, 2009. The song is about jealousy, it was made by Nicalai (Dj Swamp's new name), and contains a sample from Eusebio Digital's "History Of Things To Come".

==== Delayed release of Oameni ====
The album "People" was officially released by record label Cat Music on November 25, 2010. It features collaborations with Maximilian, Spike, Guess Who, Alex Velea, Tranda, George Hora, JJ, Faibo X, Suky, Bitză, Agresiv, Lucia Dumitrescu, Smiley, Nicalai and Fely. In November 2010, when the album was released, Nichifor was invited to an interview at the Romanian online publication "Monden.info" headquarters and stated the following:

If I'm not mistaken, the first piece was "Tango", and the second "La vremuri noi, oameni noi" (New people for newer times)" (exactly when I met the new people). In 2007 we didn't know what was happening to us, not even at Okapi Sound... It was a total mess. We went from "let's launch it online" to "let's sign with a record company, because they chose the single "Turnin", after that we met with Dorian and Ochiu "[Dorian Enache and Cristi Ochiu from Music Expert Company]", we did "Azi nu" (Not today)"... In the end we made it. The release was late because we were late...

. Nichifor shared another reason why the release was delayed:

Another thing that delayed the album was publication Gazeta Sporturilor, because in the first instance they wanted the album. But their sales proportionally decreased in time: in the first two, three, four, five months, they scored some booms and after that they decreased drastically. By the time I got to release her album, they screwed up, they kept us on standby for about half a year... But in the end it's their choice. I have no problem. Since the album dropped online, it has made a lot.

Since the night between December 7 and 8, 2010, the song "Sari pe treabă" (Get to work) written by Tranda in collaboration with Nichifor was available on YouTube. Nichifor worked on the recording, mix and lyrics, and a remix of the track featuring Skizzo Skillz was also released on December 20. On the night between December 16 and 17, 2010, the video for the fourth single from the album entitled "Dă-te mai asa (Clear the way)", was released on Okapi Sound's YouTube channel. Filming took place in November at Buftea, directed by Spike (The Evil Twin Studio). In the video, Nichifor is spied on by two characters, named Costel and Micutu' (Micutzu). The video uploaded on Okapi Sound's official YouTube channel raised 4 million views in short time.

==== Third solo album - Drumul spre succes. Making of and release. (2011-2015) ====
On September 5, 2011, Nichifor released the track called "LaLa Song" in collaboration with Guess Who. The single officially marked the start of the artist's collaboration with Music Expert Company. The song is taken from the artist's upcoming album, Unu which consisted only of this single. "LaLa Song" premiered on Pro FM and the YouTube channel of the production house Okapi Sound. The music video for the song was released on October 3, 2011, on MTV and was later uploaded online on YouTube. The video was made by rapper Spike and his team (Evil Twin Studio) in the spring of 2011, in a nightclub in Bucharest, where over a hundred fans gathered to participate in the filming. On the morning of September 14, 2011, Nechifor released the song named "Diamantele se sparg" (Diamonds break) alongside Horia Brenciu and Guess Who, single which was later included on Guess Who's album "Tot mai sus" made alongside Marius Moga. The relationship of Nichifor, Brenciu and Guess Who strengthened up after Brenciu met Guess Who in a gas station, and acquainted Nichifor on Facebook.

In 2011, Nichifor launched a new fashion with T-shirts inscribed with the message "Casă Moară Fetili" (translated as: House, Mill, Girls, a slang which would normally be understood as "In spite of the girls"). At a first glance, the uninitiated would not immediately understand what it means. The text is a reproduction of the lyrics of the song "Turnin'". The message of this text was initially worn on a T-shirt by Vlad from the band Agresiv, but it was popularized by Nichifor. During the 2012 Romanian political protests, Nichifor stated the following: "It's normal for people to take it to the streets. There's hunger, it's cold outside, there's poverty. I have been making a special dedication to them at every concert for two years now. My fans protest at every show against the current power.

On February 6, 2012, Nichifor and rapper Mitza offered to listen the song included on the mixtape "Robot", "Bright Lights, Bigger City" - a freestyle made on the instrumental of Cee Lo Green. In the evening of February 20, 2012, another song performed by Nichifor himself in collaboration with Mario named "Talent divin" (Divine talent) was released.

On June 21, 2012, song "Turbofin" (Turbofine) was released. The song was produced by Mitza and Nichifor in the Okapi Sound studio, being thought and designed exclusively for the Internet fans. After the release, Nichifor stated the following: "I finished the song recently, right before the video, but it's been in the oven for about a year... Mitza made the beat a year and a half ago,". The video was directed by Spike and produced with his team at Evil Twin Studio. Filming took place at Video Link studios, over the course of a whole day. Romanian porn actress Sandra Romain also makes an appearance in the video. The story of the video seems to be inspired by the life of the famous actress who signs the divorce papers at one point, being in a similar situation in real life. The artist claims that the idea of collaborating with Sandra came to him after he met the actress at an event, and the one who introduced them was Laura Andreșan.

== Musical style ==
Nichifor mainly performs in the hip-hop music genre, although his family listened to other types of music such as jazz and funk. Nichifor stated that his father was a connoisseur of bass. Because of this, Nichifor stated Stevie Wonder, George Benson, Chick Corea and Timpuri Noi as his favourite artists of the respective genre. His favorite hip hop artists include Jay-Z and B.U.G. Mafia. Among his dislikes is singer Inna. When asked about it, Nichifor stated the following: "I sing with people I feel like, with good people. I have to make a connection. People who have a sparkle, I haven't seen anything like that in her, I don't know what to say. I can't even listen to pop music in nightclubs I'd rather listen to Salam, I swear. Salam is a real one, Salam knows music. He attended the conservatory, he was colleagues with Paula Seling, he knows his stuff.

His music stands out for its impactful social message, for the technicality of interpretation and for the ingenuity with which he combines rhythms and generates moods. The success recorded and the positive reactions received from the public, lead him to go further and look for new directions in music and new ways of expressing his favorite themes. There have been many comments that Nichifor has started to switch to the commercial genre, and he stated that: "Grasu has always been commercial. I don't see it that way, there's a lot of prejudice in our hip-hop community. If you think about it for a while, you realize that every rap listener is in his own way some kind of M.C.. I swear. Every rapper has his own band, I swear, they all think Grasu XXL is gone, that he's sold out. The national radio networks are very important, if you want to make money, through which you promote yourself "seriously". For me, the Internet is the most important source of promotion". "I think that the radios demand very "live" music, and what they mean by "live" is not what we understand, and that's why I think it's so hard to get on the radio. Now, it's everyone's choice and you don't have anything to say to them, because radio is a business, and people have to get their audiences".

== Controversies ==
=== Scandals and arguments with rival rappers ===
On June 3, 2006, the MTV Romania Music Awards 2006 event took place at the Horia Demian Sports Hall in Cluj-Napoca. The show of the evening, however, was the scandal between rapper Puya of the La Familia band and B.U.G. Mafia. Nichifor was very close to a fight with the La Familia component, the altercation starting with the gesture of Tataee - from the aforementioned band - to spit on the latter. At the root of the conflict are the statements that Puya made to the media in front of the members of B.U.G. Mafia, those who gave them and at the same time took back the title of "La Familia" to him and his band partner Tudor Sișu.

The release of the music video for the song "We Don't Care, We Don't Give a Fuck" signed by Markone1 with Cheloo aroused the massive curiosity of fans in front of the harsh message of the crosses inscribed with the names of Guess Who, Spike, Mini Moga (Iulian Moga), Connect-R and Nichifor himself. From the desire for controversy or not, Cheloo wrote on the crosses: Connect-R - "Dead without feathers", Grasu XXL - "Dead of hunger", Guess Who - "The right place" and Iulian Moga - "Director's Cut".

== Personal life ==
Although he is very reserved about statements regarding his personal life, Nichifor confessed that he lost both his parents at the age of 13, thus remaining an orphan at a very young age. In an interview from 2011 he stated the following: "I have nothing to talk about when it comes to my personal life, it's very boring. Very boring, seriously. I watch movies, smoke weed, and watch movies. I sing and I'm in the studio. So this personal life is: playstation, weed and watching movies. And lots of music. I listen to a lot of music.

On February 24, 2013, he was involved in a serious car accident. The rapper suffered a craniocerebral trauma while returning from a concert.

Nichifor was suspected towards the end of 2007 of having a relationship with journalist Laura Andreșan, after which he vehemently denied these rumours. In 2011, the artist stated that he didn't wish to have any children.

In 2020, after a 12-year relationship, Nichifor broke up with his partner Laura Andreșan. The couple have a girl named Elena, born in 2019. In 2024, she inspired Nichifor to release the song "Tu, Mărie!" (Hey, Mary).

== Discography ==
=== Studio albums ===
List of studio albums
Title	Album details
Curaj	Released: 2006; Format: CD, digital download; Label: Cat Music, Casa Productions
Oameni	Released: 2010; Format: CD, digital download; Label: Cat Music
Drumul Spre Succes	Released: 2015; Format: CD, digital download; Label: Okapi Sound, Universal Music Romania
În Labirint (with Guess Who)	Released: 2018; Format: CD, digital download; Label: Okapi Sound, Universal Music Romania

=== Mixtape albums ===
List of mixtape albums
Title	Album details
Evident (with DJ Swamp)	Released: 2007; Format: CD, digital download; Label: None

=== Live albums ===
List of live albums
Title	Album details
Grasu XXL Live at Euphoria Music Hall	Released: 2013; Format: AAC, digital download; Label: Music Expert Company

=== Singles ===
==== As lead artist ====
List of singles, with selected chart positions
Title	Year	Peak chart positions	Album
Title	Year	ROM	Album
"Turnin'" (feat. Alex Velea)	2009	—	Oameni
"Azi Nu" (feat. Guess Who)	2010	—	Oameni
"Dă-te mai așa"	2010	—	Oameni
"LaLa Song"	2011	—	Non-album singles
Turbofin	2012	—	Non-album singles

== Awards and nominations ==
=== MTV Europe Music Awards ===
The MTV Europe Music Awards is an event presented by MTV Networks Europe which awards prizes to musicians and performers. In 2012, Nichifor was nominated for the Best Romanian Act.

Year	Nominee / work	Award	Result	Ref.
2012	Himself	Best Romanian Act	Nominated	

=== Romanian Music Awards ===
The Romanian Music Awards is a yearly major Romanian musical event, awarding the best artists in Romania's music scene. Nichifor was nominated a total of eight times at five different categories and has won a total of two awards.

Year	Nominee / work	Award	Result	Ref.
2010	"Around the World" (ft. Deepside Deejays & Alex Velea)	Best Featuring	Won	
2010	"Turnin'" (ft. Alex Velea)	Best Hip-Hop Song	Nominated	
2011	"Azi Nu" (ft. Guess Who)	Best Hip-Hop Song	Nominated	
2012	"LaLa Song" (ft. Guess Who)	Best Hip-Hop Song	Won	

=== Media Music Awards ===
Year	Nominee / work	Award	Result	Ref.
2014	"Deja vu" (ft. Ami)	Best YouTube	Won	
