= Oameni =

Studio album by Grasu XXL
- Released: 25 November 2010
- Recorded: 2008–2010
- Genres: hip hop; Jazz rap; Pop rap
- Length: 62:30
- Label: Cat Music
- Producer: Grasu XXL

Grasu XXL chronology
Curaj (2006)	Oameni (2010)	Drumul Spre Succes (2015)

Singles from Oameni
- 1. "Turnin'" Released: 2 November 2009; 2. "Azi Nu" Released: 25 February 2010

Oameni (Romanian pronunciation: [oaˈ meni]; (People)) is the second studio album by Romanian singer Grasu XXL, released on November 25, 2010. The album was nominated at the "Best Hip Hop" category through song Azi NU (Not today) at the 2011 edition of the Romanian Music Awards.

== Album story ==
Main artist Grasu XXL started working on the album around September 2007. The album had its fair share of delays and was very late.

In November 2010, shortly after the album was released, the artist was invited to an interview at the Romanian publication Monden.info headquarters and stated the following: "If I'm not mistaken, the first piece was "Tango", and the second "La vremuri noi, oameni noi" (New people for newer times), just when I met the new people. In 2007 we didn't know what was happening to us - not even at Okapi... It was a total mess. We went from "let's launch it on the net" to "let's sign with a record company, because they chose the single "Turnin'", after that we met with artists Dorian and Ochiu, we released "Azi Nu" (Not today)... In the end I got here. It's late it's late..."

The album was supposed to be released in 2007, although bad management made the album wait. The release was also delayed on September 24, 2009, and the reasons could be seen at the "Monden.info Show" on September 29, 2009. According to information provided by monden.info, the material should have appeared at the end of 2009.

=== Release ===
Professional ratings
Review scores
Source	Rating
MusicBrainz	3/5 stars

The album was released on November 25, 2011, by Cat Music.

== Tracks ==
=== Special tracks ===
In the summer of 2009, he released the first single promoting the Oameni album known as "Prea mult fum" (Too much smoke), a collaboration with Mitză from band "Agresiv". The video of the song was directed by Spike, several Okapi Sound members were present at the filming: Agresiv, Guess Who, Maximilian, JJ, but also Laura Andreșan and Motzu (some of them also appear in the video). At the end of 2009, the second single "Turnin'" followed which was a collaboration with Alex Velea'. The song was made by HaHaHa Production and benefited from a clip directed by Iulian Moga filmed at Buftea, a township near Bucharest.

The third single came in the spring of 2010 under the name of "Azi Nu" (Not today), a collaboration with rapper Guess Who. It was a huge success, garnering a million views on the Okapi Sound's YouTube channel in an extremely short time. Directed by Marian Crișan, the music video was released at the end of May and was filmed on the beach at Corbu village near Constanța.

The video for the song "Dă-te mai așa" (Clear the way) was released on the night of December 16 to 17, 2010 on Okapi Sound's YouTube channel. Filming took place in November at Buftea, directed by Spike (The Evil Twin Studio).

== Track listing ==
No.	Title	Length
1.	"La Vremuri Noi, Oameni Noi (New people for newer times) (feat. Mitză)"	1:40
2.	"Mi Se Spune ... (My name is...) (feat. Spike)"	3:15
3.	"Prinde-ne, Bă, Dacă Poți (Yo, catch us if you can) (feat. Smiley)"	3:01
4.	"Azi NU (Not today) (feat. Guess Who"	3:24
5.	"Frumoasa Și Bestia (Beauty and the beast) (feat. Feli & George Hora)"	2:59
6.	"Turnin' (feat. Alex Velea)"	3:27
7.	"Grav, Grav (Serious, serious) (feat. JJ & Nicalai)"	2:58
8.	"Soneria (The doorbell) (feat. Alex Velea, Tranda & Vlad Lucan)"	3:46
9.	"În Aer (In the air) (feat. JJ)"	3:33
10.	"The Freakshow (feat. JJ & Nicalai)"	3:24
11.	"Evident (Obvious)"	3:24
12.	"Prea Mult Fum (Too much smoke) (feat. Mitză)"	3:21
13.	"Dă-te Mai Așa (Clear the way)"	3:05
14.	"Ultimul Tango (The last Tango) (feat. Maximilian)"	3:19
15.	"O Fată Face Carieră (A girl makes a career) (feat. Lucia Dumitrescu & Mitză)"	3:36
16.	"Perfect (feat. Suzi)"	3:50
17.	"Orașu' De Piatră (The stone town)"	3:40
18.	"Călătorul (Journeyman) (feat. Vlad Lucan)"	3:22
19.	"Cel Mai Rău Prieten, Cel Mai Bun Dușman (Worst friend, best enemy) (feat. Bitză)"	4:10
Total length:		62:30

== Personnel ==
- Vocals, production, arrangements – Grasu XXL, Agresiv
- Engineer (Mix) – Cristi Dobrică, Grasu XXL, Mitză
- Mastered, Mixed – Cristi Dobrică
- Music (Keyboards) – Tataee, EleFunk, Vlad Lucan, Mitză

== Release history ==
- 2010 Romania: CD Cat Music 101 2720 2
