= Șerban Huidu =

Romanian radio and TV star (born 1976)

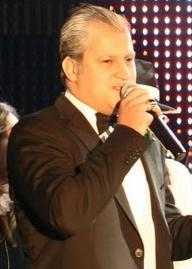
- Born: July 16, 1976 (age 50); Bucharest, Romania
- Citizenship: Romania
- Education: Bucharest Academy of Economic Studies
- Occupations: Television and radio presenter
- Television: Cronica Cârcotașilor
- Spouse: Cristina Huidu
- Children: 2

Șerban Sebastian Huidu (born July 16, 1976 in Bucharest) is a Romanian radio and TV star. He hosted, together with Mihai Găinușă, the morning show on Romanian radio station Kiss FM, and a weekly satire show (Cronica Cârcotașilor) on the Romanian channel Prima TV.

== Biography ==
=== Education and career ===
Șerban Huidu graduated from the Faculty of General Economics within the Bucharest Academy of Economic Studies and, until now, he has never worked in this field. Also during college, he realized his passion for the media, working for a radio station in Bucharest where he worked for six months without being paid.

In 1995 Șerban Huidu got a job at a radio station, and in 1997 he started the show Cronica Cârcotașului on Radio 21, a pamphlet addressed to the politicians of that time. In 2000, the show began airing on Prima TV. During the same period, Mihai Găinușă joined Șerban Huidu in making the radio show. In just one year, Mihai Găinușă also became his set partner, so that since 2001 the show Cronica Cârcotașului is transformed into Cronica Cârcotașilor. In 2003 the two filmmakers moved from Radio 21 to Kiss FM.

=== Accidents ===
On December 29, 2010, he was hospitalized in the University Hospital of Innsbruck, Austria, with a cranial haemorrhage, following a serious ski accident. On 16 October 2011, Huidu caused a road accident on DN1 in the area of Timișu de Sus, Brașov County, resulting in 3 deaths. In 2009, 1 km away from the site, Huidu had made an illegal overtaking and his driving license was suspended for a month. While driving a Mercedes-Benz, he veered into the oncoming lane on a curve with wet road conditions, resulting in a head-on collision with a Dacia Logan traveling legally. Following the impact, two passengers in the Dacia died at the scene, while a third person later died in the hospital due to the severity of their injuries.

== Income ==
According to data from the Ministry of Finance, Huidu had a monthly income of 53,000 euros per month from television activities during 2005-2013. Its total net profit was 25,762,995 lei (approximately 5.8 million euros), the equivalent of 644,000 euros per year, or 53,000 euros per month. Huidu registered his trademarks "Cronica Carcotașilor", "Top Rușinică", "Dezbrăcatu '", "Puștiu", "Bebelușe", and "Mistrețu" on a company where he is the majority associate and administrator.
