= Raluca Lăzăruț =

Romanian actress and TV host

- Born: 5 November 1982 (age 43); Deva, Romania
- Education: West University of Timișoara (B.A)
- Occupations: Actress; TV host; journalist
- Years active: 2004–present
- Known for: Big Brother: Romania (2004) contestant
- Television: Kanal D; Antena 1; Antena 3
- Spouse: Horatiu Boeriu (m. 2015)
- Children: 2
- Website: www.ralucalazarut.ro

Raluca Lăzăruț (born 5 November 1982) is a Romanian actress, TV host, news anchor and journalist. She is known for her performances in TV shows like Big Brother: Romania (2004) and Superbingo Metropolis (2010). She is also a former Kanal D news anchor, and Antena 1 and Antena 3 sports anchor.

== Early life and education ==
Raluca Lăzăruț was born on 5 November 1982, in Deva, Romania. She graduated in applied linguistics at the West University of Timișoara in 2007.

== Career ==
Her debut TV appearance was the Romanian version of the international reality television franchise Big Brother 2 in 2004 where she ended up as one of the finalists. After that, she made her way to host a lifestyle show Clubbing on National TV Romania. From 2007 to 2010, she worked as a sports anchor and field reporter for sports events on Antena 3. Then she anchored a TV show Superbingo Metropolis on Antena 1 from 2010 to 2012. Her next venture was into the news media. She joined the television channel Kanal D as a news anchor in 2012 for the next 3 years before leaving Romania for the United States.

Lăzăruț was also on the cover of several print magazines, including FHM and TV Mania

As an actress, Lăzăruț's debut play was Raluca + 1 (2013). In 2014, she moved to the United States and began working in the American entertainment industry. She was a character in the medical drama Chicago Med (2015). She was cast in the role of a reporter in the Fox series Empire. She also played "Catwoman" in a video game. She has appeared in several TV commercials as well.

Lăzăruț was cast as the role of Szuza in the MGM+ series Emperor of Ocean Park.

== Personal life ==
Lăzăruț started dating an American entrepreneur Horatiu Boeriu in 2014 and then married him a year later in America. The couple resides in Chicago and has a daughter. Lăzăruț announced in October 2022 that a second baby is on the way.

The baby boy was born on October 14 in Chicago.

== Filmography ==
Year	Title	Role
2004	Big Brother (Romanian TV series)	Self
2013	Raluca+1	Raluca
2015	Chicago Med	Nurse
2015	Empire	TV Reporter
2017	Honest Game Trailers (TV Series)	Catwoman
2024	Emperor of Ocean Park	Szuza
