= Curaj =

Studio album by Grasu XXL
- Released: 13 July 2006
- Recorded: 2005–2006
- Genres: hip hop; Pop rap
- Length: 45:01
- Labels: Cat Music; Casa Productions
- Producer: Grasu XXL

Grasu XXL chronology
Curaj (2006)	Oameni (2010)

Singles from Curaj
- 1. "Curaj" Released: July 2006

Curaj (Romanian pronunciation: [kuˈ raj]; (Courage)) is the first studio album by Romanian singer Grasu XXL, released on July 13, 2006.

== Album story ==
=== Concept and composition ===
Curaj (Courage), was Grasu XXL's first ever main studio album, remarking itself through original material, both in sound and performance. With this material, the artist wanted to take the Romanian hip-hop out of the "neighborhood patterns". The album was produced by Tataee and Caddy of B.U.G. Mafia (executive producers) and was recorded, mixed and mastered at the Ines Sound and Video label in Bucharest.

The material enjoyed a lot of success, mainly through singles such as Curaj (Courage) and Fără Filtru (No filter). The latter song featured a remix made by Mari of M&G, Maximilian and Paco. In 2009, rapper Guess Who performed a cover of the song known as Flori Ilegale (Illegal flowers). All the 13 songs on the album are in collaboration with at least an artist, featuring singers such as DJ Swamp, Bitză, Mari, Houdini and Maximiian of Mahsat, Paco 10 Grei, Queen Bee, Mario, Artan, Uzzi of la B.U.G. Mafia și Villy.

In 2006, the EP "Courage (Remix)" album appears, being another material released by Nichifor together with DJ Swamp to promote the album with the same name together with the mixtape "Evident" released in 2007 with Swamp. The latter features tracks remixed by Swamp, Agresiv, Motzu and Villy which hinted Nichifor's forthcoming album called Oameni (People) which was going to be released in 2010.

=== Release ===
The album was released on July 13, 2006, by Cat Music and Casa Productions.

== Track listing ==
No.	Title	Writer(s)	Music	Length
1.	"Curaj (Courage)"		DJ Swamp	3:33
2.	"Fac Ce Vor (Do what they want) (feat. Bitză)"	Bitză; Paco 10 Grei	Răzvan Rusu	2:54
3.	"Fără Filtru (No filter)"	Paco 10 Grei	Ștefan Mihăilescu; Tataee; Mari	3:10
4.	"Dans Murdar (Dirty dance) (feat. Queen Bee)"	Houdini; Paco 10 Grei	Houdini; Paco 10 Grei	3:14
5.	"La Adăpost (Sheltered) (feat. Villy)"		Cristi Dobrică	4:10
6.	"Elegant (feat. Maximilian & Mario)"	Maximilian; Mario	Andrei "Motanu" Vlad; Ștefan Mihăilescu	3:55
7.	"Jos Jos Jos (Down down down) (feat. Paco 10 Grei)"	Paco 10 Grei	Tataee; DJ Swamp	2:57
8.	"Legendele (The legends) (feat. Paco 10 Grei)"	Paco 10 Grei	Ștefan Mihăilescu	3:55
9.	"Full Option (feat. Maximilian)"	Maximilian	DJ Swamp	3:27
10.	"Sare Casa (House bounces) (feat. Houdini & Mahsat)"	Houdini; Paco 10 Grei	Ștefan Mihăilescu	3:54
11.	"Phen So Kames (feat. Uzzi & Villy)"	Uzzi; Villy	Tataee	3:05
12.	"Trăiesc Un Vis (Livin' a dream)"	Adrian "Artan" Pleșca; Răzvan Moldovan	Timpuri Noi; Artan	3:16
13.	"Fără Filtru Remix (No filter remix) (feat. Maximilian & Paco 10 Grei)"	Maximilian; Paco 10 Grei	Tataee; Ștefan Mihăilescu	3:31
Total length:				45:01

== Release history ==
- 2010 Romania: CD Cat Music 101 2543 2
- 2010 Romania: CD Casa Productions 101 2543 2
