= Drumul Spre Succes =

Studio album by Grasu XXL
- Released: 23 March 2015
- Recorded: 2011–2015
- Genres: Hip hop; Pop rap
- Length: 42:30
- Labels: Okapi Sound; Universal Music Romania
- Producer: Grasu XXL

Grasu XXL chronology
Oameni (2010)	Drumul Spre Succes (2015)	În Labirint (2018)

Singles from Drumul Spre Succes
- 1. "Turbofin" Released: 21 June 2012; 2. "Tare, Frate (feat. Mitză)" Released: 11 April 2013

Drumul Spre Succes (Romanian pronunciation: [druˈ mulˈ spreˈ sukˈ tʃesˈ]; (Road to success)) is the third studio album by Romanian singer Grasu XXL, released on March 23, 2015.

== Release ==
The album was released on March 24, 2015, by Okapi Sound and Universal Music Romania.

=== Album story ===
"Drumul spre succes" (Way to success), the third album released by Grasu XXL is a co-production between Okapi Soud and Universal Music, being available both in physical format (vinyl, deluxe and standard) in the entire Cărturesti network, as well as in all specialty stores . The material, which contains 13 tracks, can also be found on Deezer, GetMusic.ro, Google Play and in the iTunes store.

The album's release came along a short presentation film. Regarding the film, which shares the same name of the album "Drumul spre succes" (Way to success). It announced the release of the album and was made by a young team of filmmakers, consisting of Tudor Vladimir Panduru (screenplay and image), Andrei-Nicolae Teodorescu (director and screenplay), Răzvan Ilinca (editing) and Andrei Boanța (sound design), during one month of work. The executive producer was Mircea Ştefan. The short film presents five real, totally different stories of people who sought the road to success, building daily through work and perseverance. The film's soundtrack also includes songs from Grasu XXL's new album.

== Track listing ==
No.	Title	Writer(s)	Music	Length
1.	"Drumul Spre Succes (Road to success) (feat. Andrei Pleșu)"			3:44
2.	"Anu' Unu (Year one) (feat. Guess Who)"			2:50
3.	"Blanădeurs (Bear fur) (feat. Mari & DJ Undoo)"	Mitză	Grasu XXL; DJ Undoo	3:29
4.	"Așa E Lumea (That's how the world is) (feat. MefX)"			3:29
5.	"Dincolo de Noi (Beyond us) (feat. Maximilian)"			3:45
6.	"Ok (feat. Tranda)"			3:13
7.	"Tare, Frate (Hard, bro!) (feat. Mitză)"	Grasu XXL; Mitză		3:35
8.	"Victoria"			4:26
9.	"Turbofin"	Grasu XXL	Guess Who; DDA; Mitză	3:44
10.	"Uite Cum Se Face (Look how it's done) (feat. Zhao)"			3:23
11.	"Minciuni Adevărate (True lies) (feat. Feli)"			2:40
12.	"Dl. Destin (Mr. Destiny) (feat. Florin Chilian & Guess Who)"			2:59
13.	"Outro"			1:11
Total length:				42:30

== Release history ==
- 2015 Romania: CD Okapi Sound 4727051
- 2015 Romania: CD Universal Music Romania 4727051
