= Valea Vadului (disambiguation) =

Valea Vadului may refer to the following places:

- Valea Vadului, a river in Constanța County, tributary of the Black Sea
- Valea Vadului, another name for the upper course of the river Ocolișel in Cluj County
- Valea Vadului, a village in the commune Iara, Cluj County
