= Capu Midia Training Range =

Romanian training range

- Poligonul Capu Midia
- Corbu, Constanța County; Near Constanța in Romania
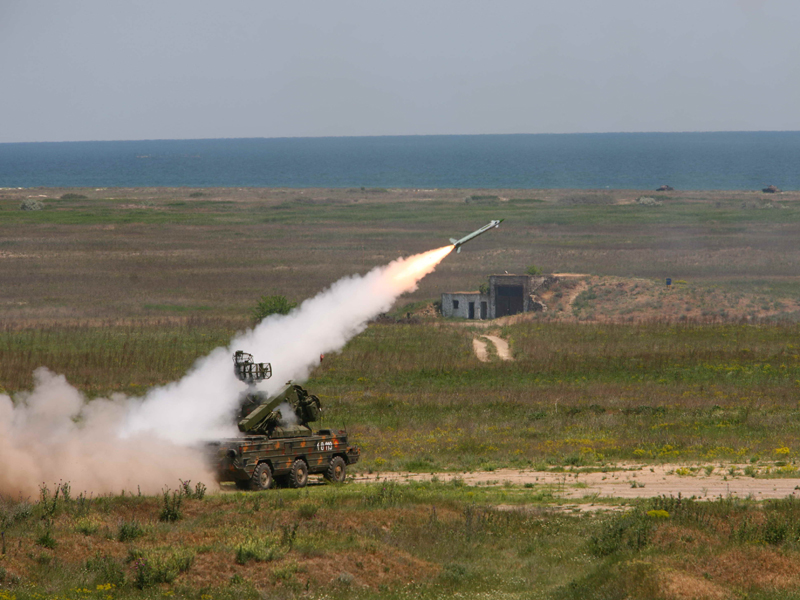
- A Romanian 9K33 OSA surface-to-air missile system during a military exercise at Capu Midia

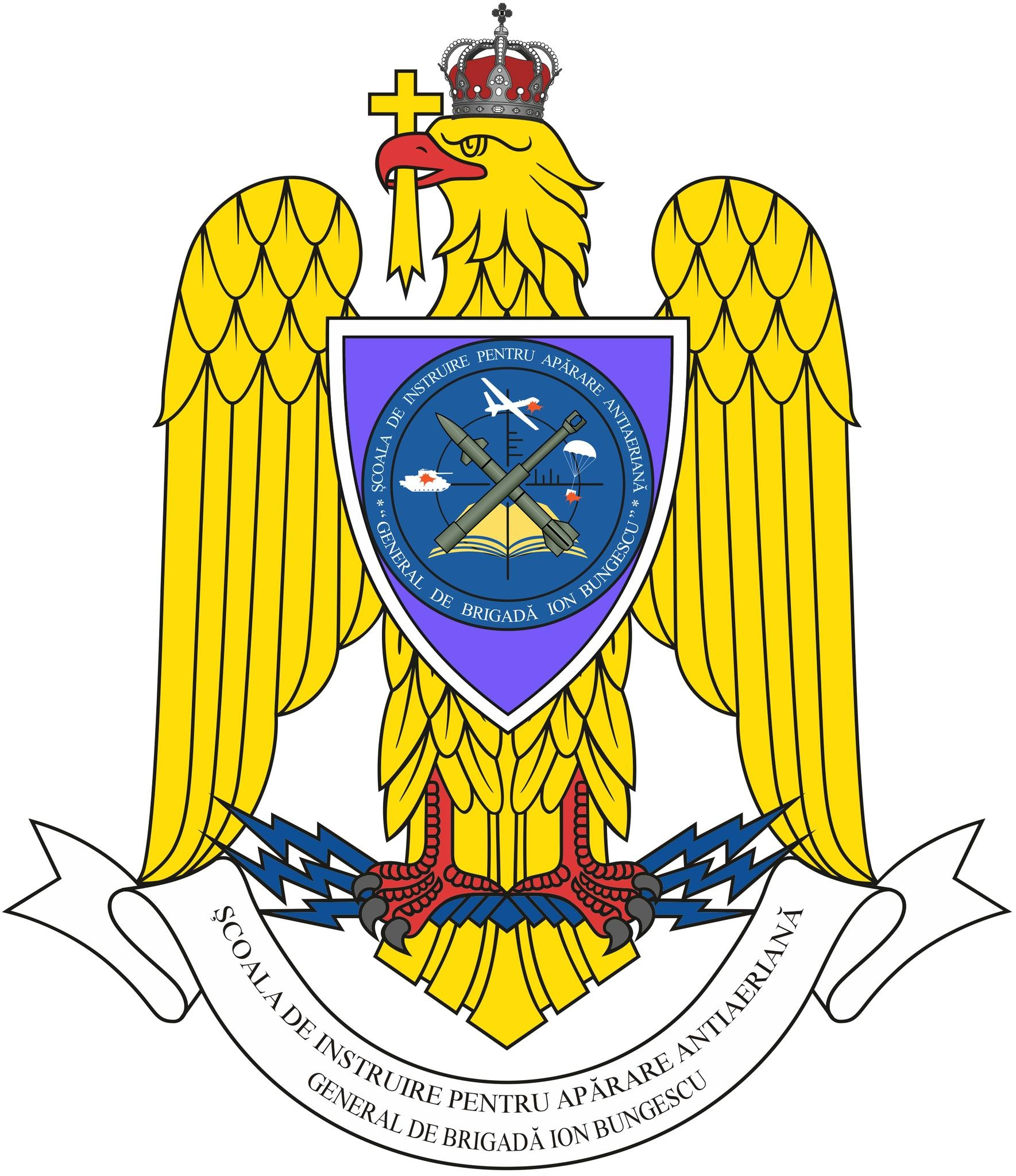
- Coat of arms of the Air Defense Training School "Brigadier General Ion Bungescu"

Site information
- Controlled by: Romanian Air Force

Location
- Location within Romania Location within Europe
- Coordinates: 44°23′14.5″N 28°42′48.5″E

Site history
- Built: 1950
- In use: 1950–present

Garrison information
- Current commander: Colonel Viorel-Eugen Bitan

The Capu Midia Training Range, officially named the Air Defense Training School "Brigadier General Ion Bungescu" (Romanian: Școala de Instruire pentru Apărare Antiaeriană "General de brigadă Ion Bungescu"), is a Romanian training range and an air defense school subordinated to the General Staff of the Air Force. It is located near the village of Corbu in Constanța County, 20 kilometres (12 mi) north of the city of Constanța.

== History ==
=== Anti-Aircraft Defense Training Center 1938-1945 ===
The first air defense school in Romania was established on 1 April 1938, as the Anti-Aircraft Defense Training Center, initially located at Dealul Spirii. The Training Center was subordinated to the Ministry of Air and Navy through the Anti-Aircraft Defense Command. At the command of the unit was Major Ion Bungescu. Until April 1944, the unit continued its activity in Bucharest, taking part in the defense of the capital during the Second World War. Between 1944 and 1945, it was moved to Făgăraș where it took part in the military actions in the area. Abolished in 1945, then merged with the Officer School, it continued to function until 1949 under the Anti-Aircraft Artillery Directorate when it became an independent unit with the garrison at Brașov.

=== Capu Midia Training Range 1950-present ===
In 1950, the Capu Midia Training Range was established and the Anti-Aircraft Defense Training Center was moved there the next year. From 1957, the number of anti-aircraft shootings of the Romanian Army, as well as the armies of other states increased at the Training Range. In the 1960s, training exercises with surface-to-air missiles began. In the years that followed, Capu Midia went through a modernization process. Starting in 2003, the unit changed its name to the Training Camp and Surface-to-Air Shooting Range. During this time, the planning of large-scale multinational exercises, in which structures from all categories of forces in the Romanian Army participated, also began. In 2017, the unit became the National Air Defense Training Center "Brigadier General Ion Bungescu".

The first firings with the Hawk missiles were carried out in 2012, which marked an important moment in the history of the Training Range. In 2019, the United States Army brought the first Patriot system at the base during the "Saber Guardian 19" exercise. A year later, the first Romanian Patriot battery was received at Capu Midia.

On 1 July 2022, the base was transformed into the Air Defense Training School "Brigadier General Ion Bungescu", continuing the traditions of the first air defense school established in 1938.

== Organized activities ==
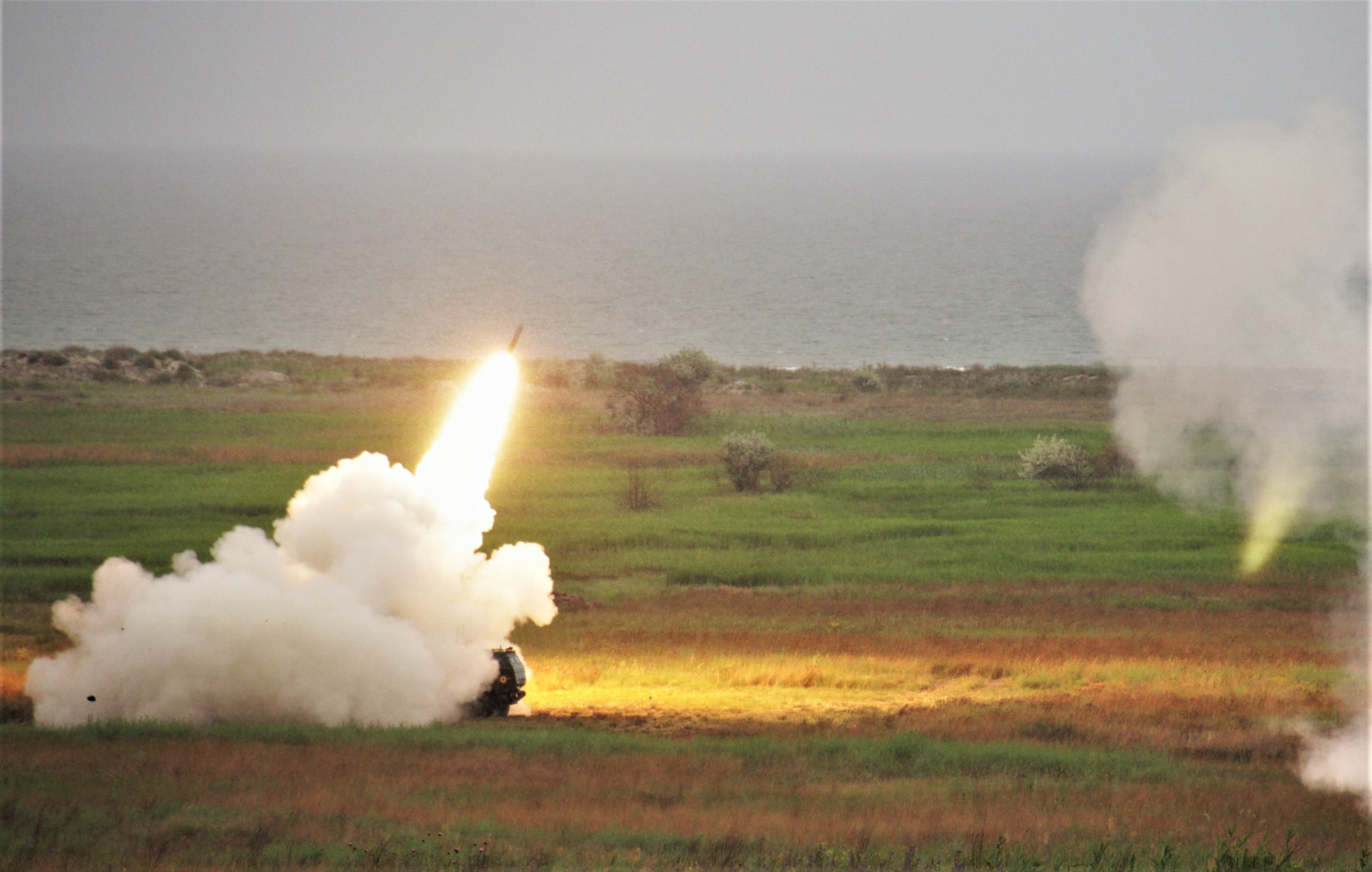
Romanian HIMARS at Capu Midia

In addition to the air defense activities, for both national units and subunits, tactical exercises with units from NATO or other states are also organized at the base. These include landing exercises, training camps, and exercises for special forces. Countries that participated in these exercises include France, Belgium, the United States of America, Canada, Germany, Moldova, Israel, the Netherlands, Slovenia, Bulgaria and Georgia.

The range also hosts testing or reception activities for different types of weapons, with or without live firings of surface-to-air, ship-to-air, air-to-air, air-to-ground, surface-to-surface, ship-to-ship, surface-to-ship and air-to-ship weapon systems. Other activities are carried out for economic operators and research agencies such as the Romanian Space Agency.

The base also has several facilities, such as firing ranges for infantry weapons, a sports base, training rooms, accommodation spaces, medical support, storage spaces, and others.

== Structure ==
Air Defense Training School "Brigadier General Ion Bungescu"

- Force Protection Battalion
  - Military Police Company
- Logistics Company

== Deployments at the base ==
At the requests of the Romanian authorities, a MAMBA surface-to-air missile system has been deployed at the base as part of Mission Aigle since May 2022. The system is fully integrated within NATO's defense systems, and can be commanded by Romanian and NATO systems via a tactical data link.

== Gallery ==
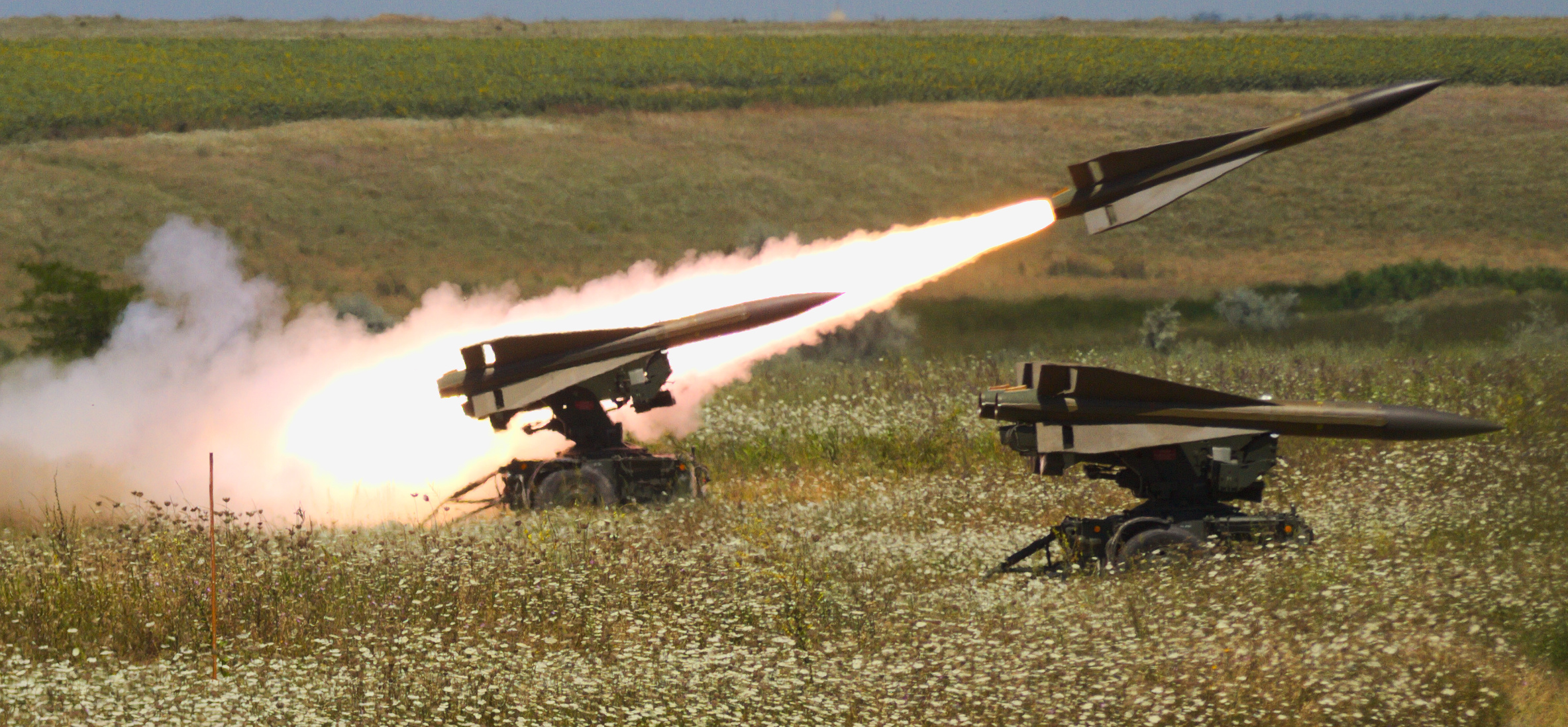
A Romanian MIM-23 Hawk missile is fired from Capu Midia Training Area

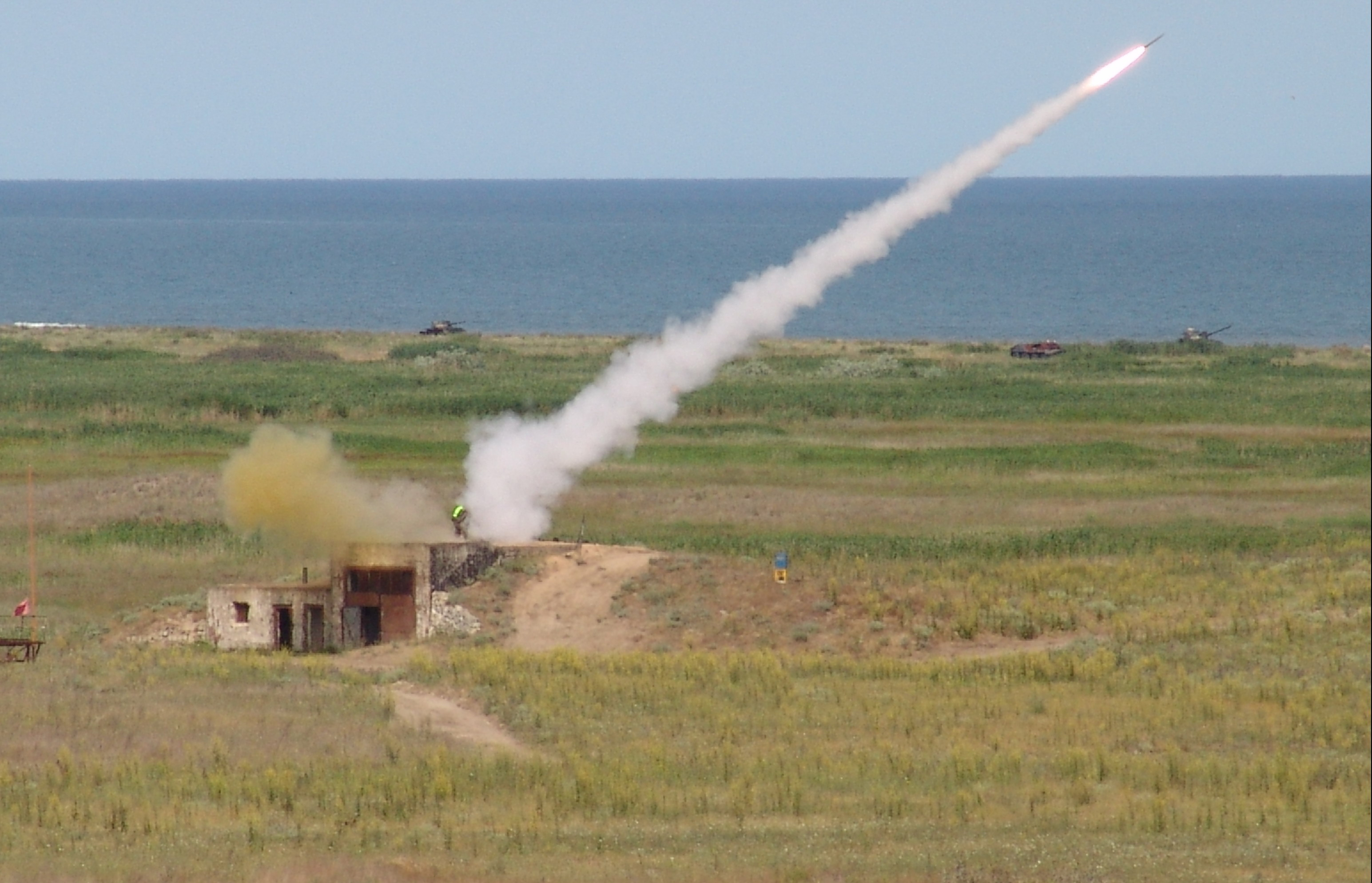
A Mistral missile launch during a French demonstration at Capu Midia

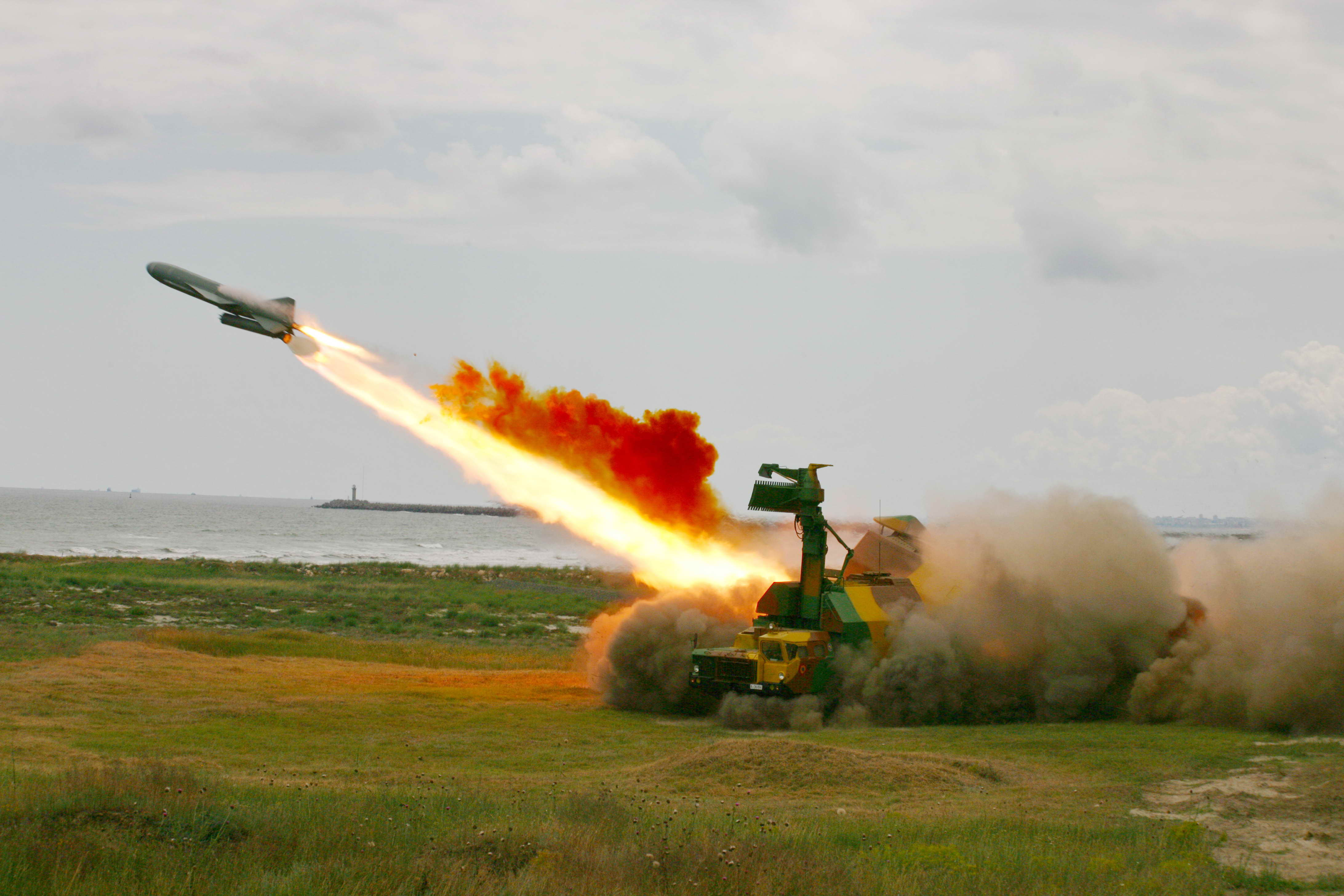
A Romanian 4K51 Rubezh anti-ship missile launching system

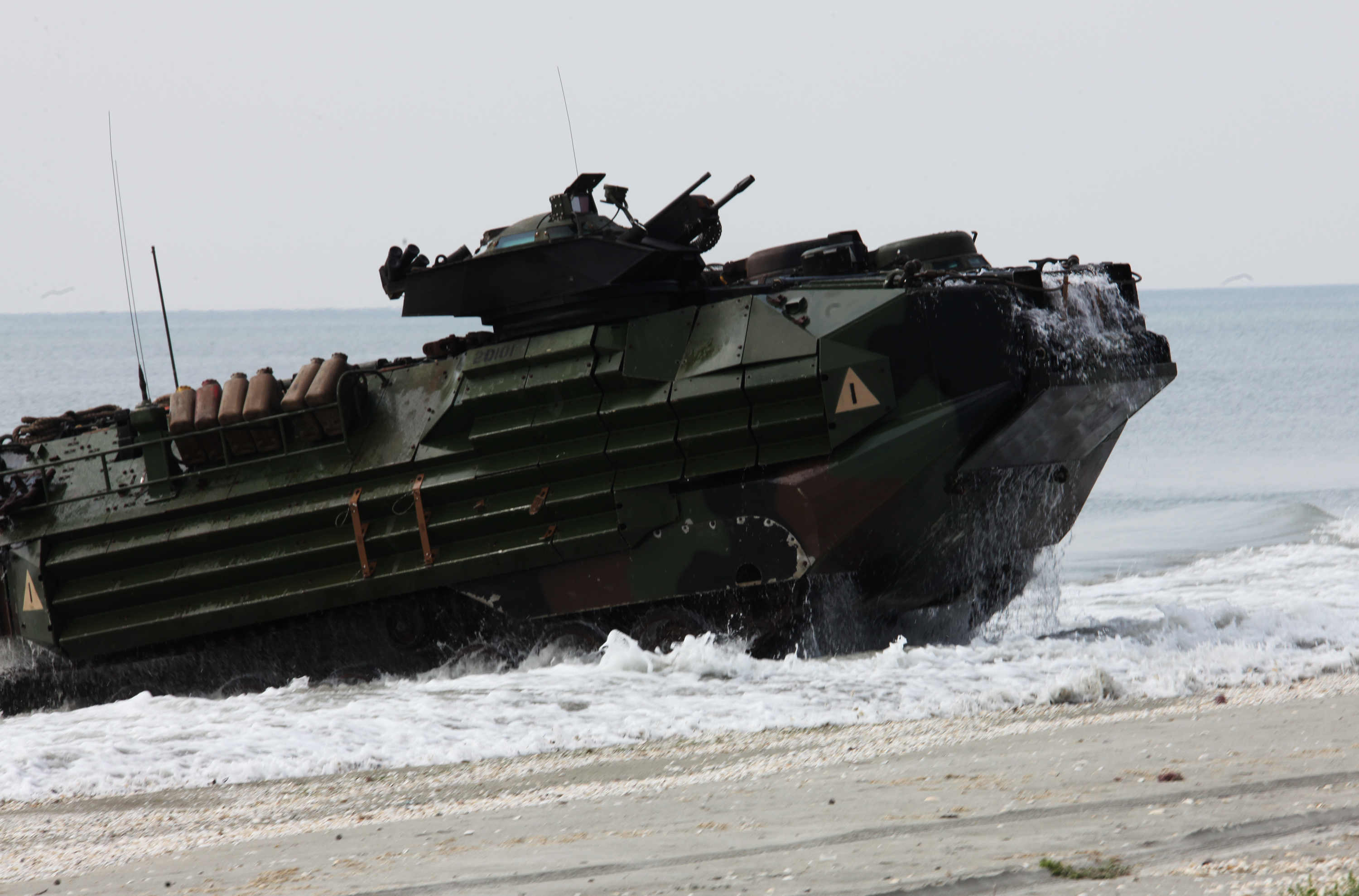
An Assault Amphibious Vehicle of the US Marine Corps during Summer Storm Amphibious Bilateral Exercise 11

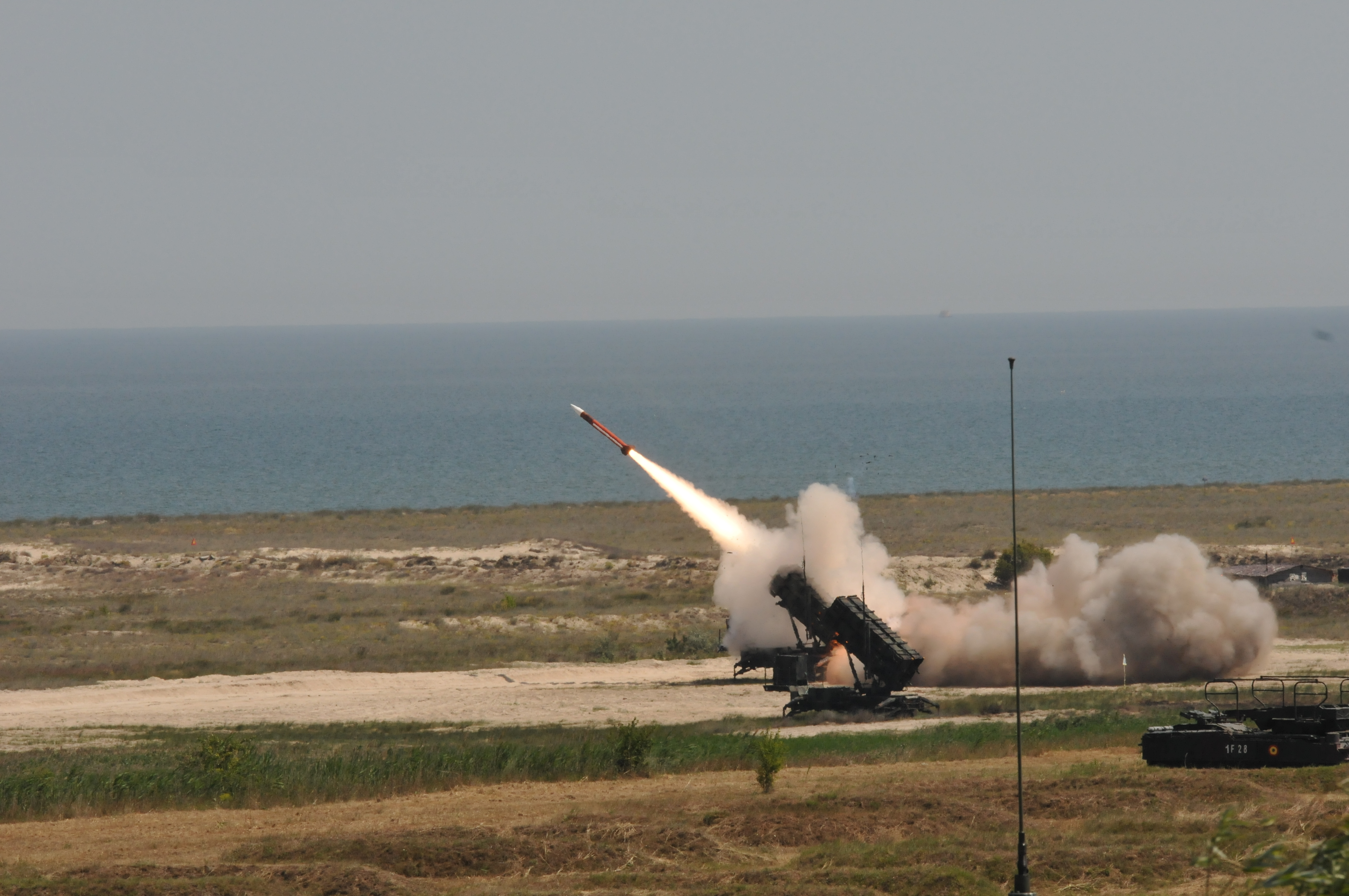
Patriot system of the 7th Air Defense Artillery Regiment during Saber Guardian 19

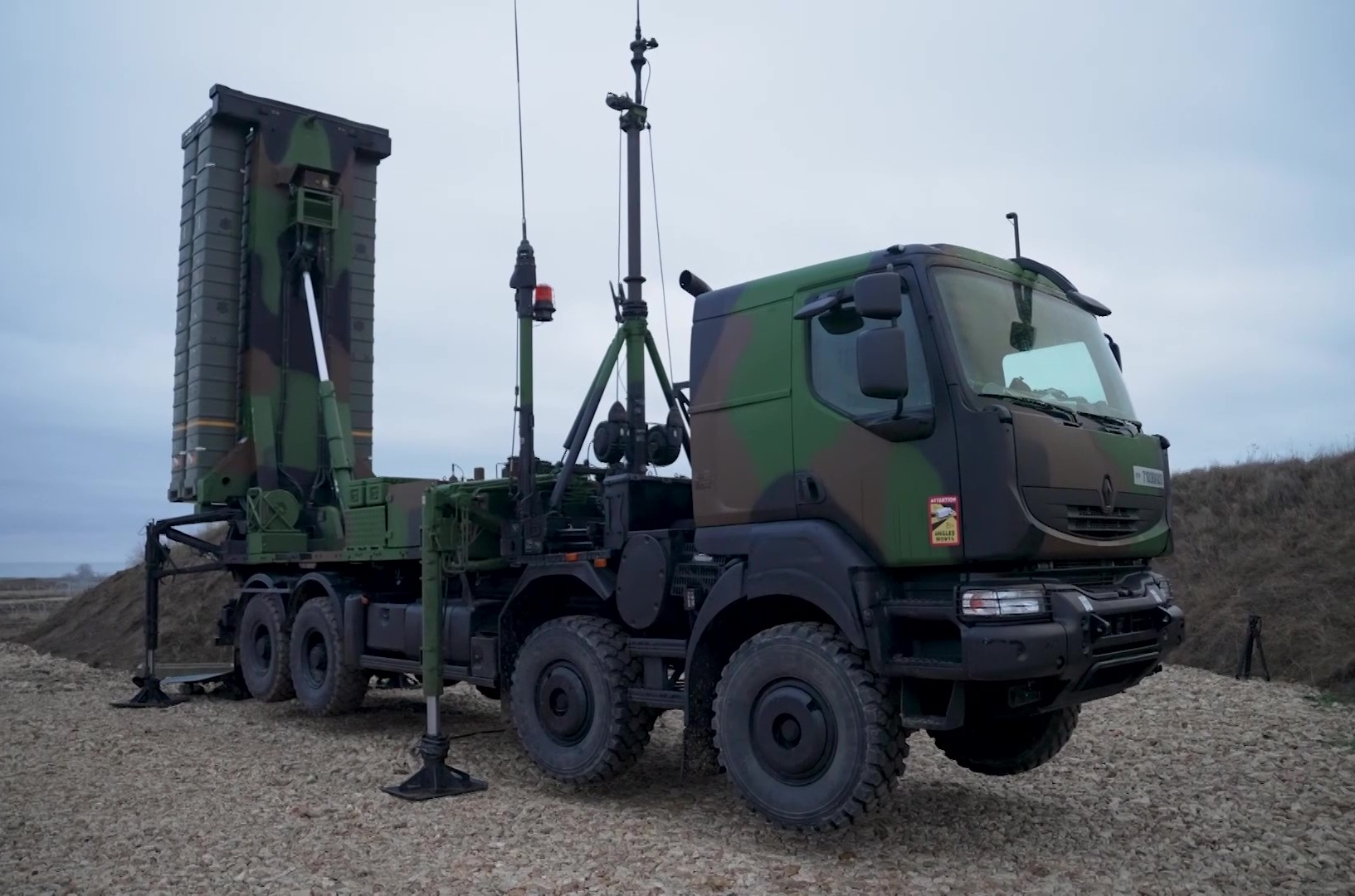
French MAMBA system deployed at the base

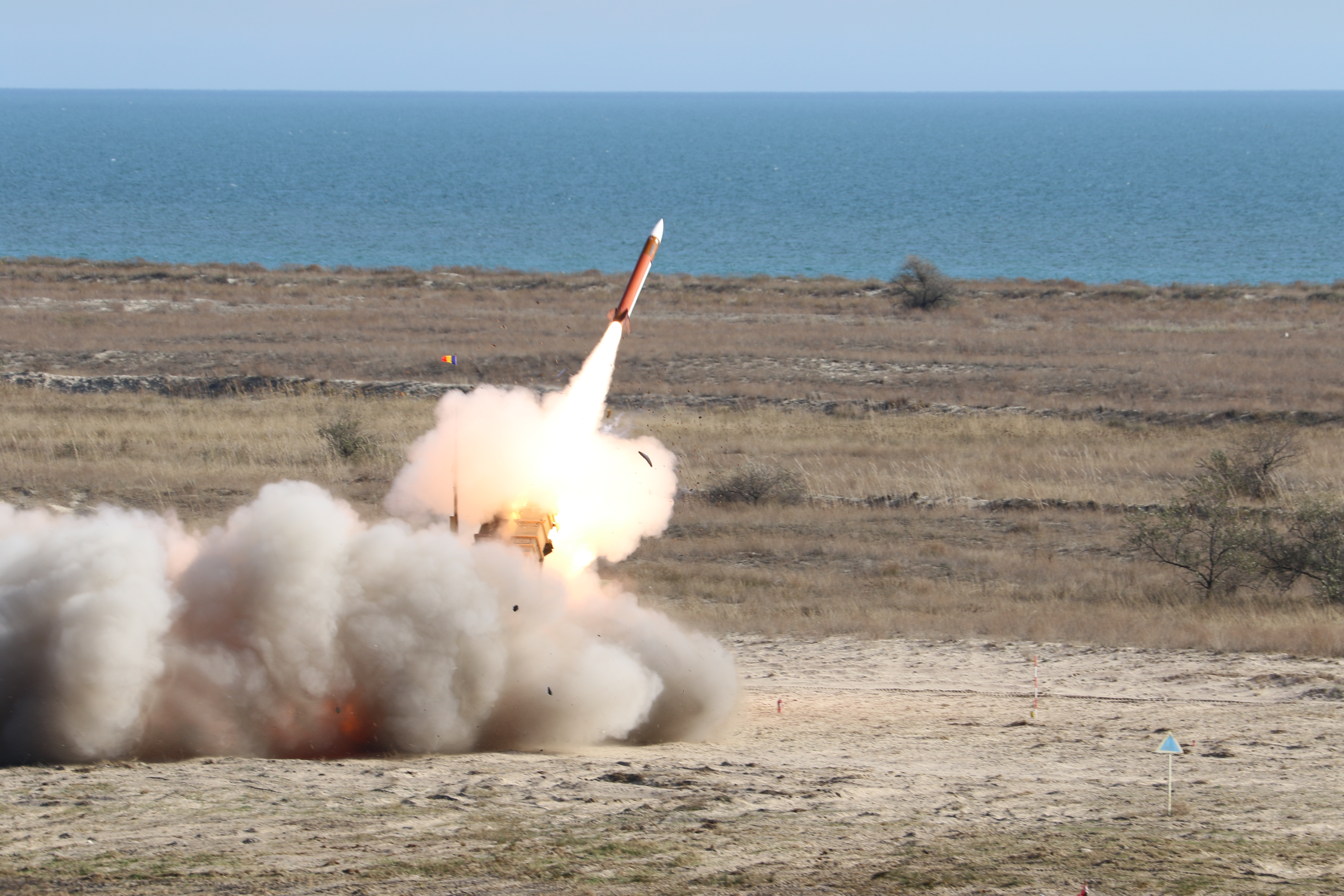
The first Romanian Patriot live-fire exercise
