= Sergiu =

Sergiu is a Romanian-language given name that may refer to:

- Sergiu Băhăian
- Sergiu Celibidache
- Sergiu Dan
- Sergiu Floroaia
- Sergiu Klainerman
- Sergiu Nicolaescu
- Sergiu P. Pașca
- Sergiu Samarian
- Sergiu Suciu
