= Radu Isac =

International stand-up comedian

- Born: Vaslui, Romania

Comedy career
- Years active: 2006–present
- Medium: Stand-up; television
- Genres: Observational comedy; dark humour; cringe comedy; surreal humor; satire; deadpan; political satire
- Website: raduisac2.com

Radu Isac is a Romanian stand-up comedian based in London. He started comedy in Romania in 2006. After short appearances on the Los Angeles stand-up scene in 2014 (Kill Tony), Radu moved to London in 2015, fully transitioning to the English-speaking comedy scene.

== Career in Romanian ==
Isac was part of the first generation of stand-up comedians in Romania, being described as the comedians' comedian.

He received an award for the art of being weird at the Romanian Comedy Festival in 2008 and the second place at the Golden Onion Festival in 2010.

Isac performed in Romanians are here at the Edinburgh Festival Fringe in 2016, together with Sergiu Floroaia and Toma Alexandru. In 2018, Isac performed in his home country Romania, on Antena 1.

== Career in English ==
Isac's humour, described as "playful, idiosyncratic" and "intelligently subversive" won him multiple awards (winner of the Funhouse Champion of Champions in 2016, Harrogate Comedian of the Year 2017) and special mentions (finalist at Amused Moose 2016, finalist at Leicester Square New Comedian of the Year 2016, finalist at English Comedian of the Year 2017).

Isac had multiple appearances at the BBC, Channel 4, and the Global Pillage Podcast. He was listed in Steve Best's book Joker Face. He had solo shows at the Edinburgh Festival Fringe in 2017, 2019, and 2022.

Isac is known for both representing and promoting immigrant comedy in London, co-founding the East European Comedy festival in 2018, which featured comedians representing 15 different countries, with shows in native languages and in English.
