= Mihai Găinușă =

Romanian broadcaster

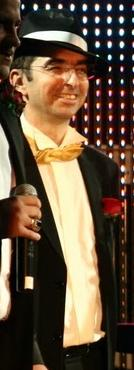
- Born: Mihai Alexandru Găinuşă; November 6, 1970 (age 54); Sibiu, Romania
- Occupation: Radio host
- Children: Eva and Andrei

Mihai Alexandru Găinuşă (born November 6, 1970, in Sibiu) is a Romanian radio and TV star, who is co-hosting the morning show on Kiss FM radio and a weekly satire show (Cronica Cârcotaşilor) on the Romanian station Prima TV.

In 2015 he was chosen by Universal Pictures to dub the narrator voice in Romanian for the animated movie Minions. In 2019 was chosen to dub in Romanian Norman's voice in the movie Secret Life of Pets 2.

== Career ==
His contract with Radio Seven, which he joined in November 2015 as radio host, had ended. He said, "It was an agreement not to go on. They do not want to invest anymore and I do not see a future together. I'm waiting for offers now. For now, I'm in talks with a radio, but I'm waiting for offers. I'm not rushing to throw myself away, that's not the case with my experience. I want to play in the big league too, I'm tired of the small league."

Mihai Găinuşă graduated from the Superior School of Journalism in Bucharest and received scholarships at Media schools in Strasbourg and Paris. He also authored six books:

- Trialoguri cârcotaşe ("Nagging Trialogues", 2003)
- Cotcodăceli ("Cackles", 2004) - a self-satirizing reference to his surname (găinuşă means "little hen" or "pullet" in Romanian)
- Fără cap şi fără coadă ("No head, no tail", 2007)
- Povestiri mortale ("Mortal Stories", 2009)
- Scândura de frizerie ("Barber's Plank", 2010)
- Jurnal din viitor ("Diary from the Future", 2011)
