= Cronica Cârcotașilor =

- Genre: Satire show
- Created by: Șerban Huidu and Mihai Găinușă
- Presented by: Șerban Huidu (2000-2011, 2015—2021, 2023-); Cristian Hrubaru (2015); Ioana Petric (2014—2021); Alex Bogdan (2014); Mihai Găinușă (2001-2014); Codruṭ Khegheṣ (2003-2014, 2015—); Oana Ioniță (2011); Gabriela Marin (2023-)
- Starring: Bebeluşele, Puştiu', Dezbrăcatu′, Gabriela Marin, and others
- Voices of: Codruṭ Khegheṣ, Șerban Huidu
- Narrated by: Codruṭ Khegheṣ, Șerban Huidu
- Country of origin: Romania
- Original language: Romanian

Production
- Production locations: Bucharest, Romania
- Camera setup: Multi-camera

Original release
- Network: Prima TV

Related
- Cronica Cârcotaşului

Cronica Cârcotaşilor (Romanian pronunciation: [ˈkronika kɨrkoˈtaʃilor],"The Grumbler' Show" or "The Grumbler' Chronicles") is a weekly satire show on Prima TV hosted by Șerban Huidu, Codruț Kegheș and Gabriela Marin.

Loosely based on the Italian entertainment program Striscia la notizia, Cronica Cârcotaşilor ridicules various celebrities from the current Romanian political, media and showbiz scene by exposing their stupidity, hypocrisy or poor grammar skills, as seen on TV.

The main features of the show are:

- the latest bloopers of the news presenters, politicians or other celebrities
- the last week's top 3 TV bloopers or ridiculous sequences from different TV shows (Top Ruşinică, approximate English translation: "Shamy-Shame Top 3" or "Hall of Shamy-Shame")
- an ironic peek behind the curtains of the fashion and showbiz scene, featuring the snobbish and labile character Cătălin Dezbrăcatu' (Cătălin the Naked, played by the actor Codruţ Chegeş), an obvious satire on the Romanian fashion designer Cătălin Botezatu.
- intermissions by attractive professional dancers nicknamed bebeluşe (Romanian for "little baby girls"); in contrast to the Striscia la notizia's veline, Cronica Cârcotaşilor features (since 2008) four dancers: Delia Florea, Oana Ionita, Ioana Petric and Cristina Zegan.

Cronica Cârcotaşilor won the Romanian Association of Television Professionals Award for Parody in 2002 and for Entertainment in 2003.
