= Valea Vadului =

- Location within Romania

Location
- Country: Romania
- Counties: Constanța County
- Villages: Vadu

Physical characteristics
- Source
  - coordinates: 44°27′03″N 28°40′51″E
  - elevation: 87 m (285 ft)
- Mouth: Black Sea
  - location: Vadu
  - coordinates: 44°26′32″N 28°44′11″E
  - elevation: 0 m (0 ft)
- Length: 7 km (4.3 mi)
- Basin size: 17 km^{2} (6.6 sq mi)

Basin features
- River code: XV.1.8a

The Valea Vadului is a river in Constanța County, Romania. Near the village Vadu it flows into the lagoon Balta Mare, which is connected with the Black Sea. Its length is 7 km (4.3 mi) and its basin size is 17 km^{2} (6.6 sq mi).
