= Kiss FM (Romania) =

Romanian radio station

- Bucharest; Romania
- Broadcast area: Romania, Moldova
- Frequencies: 96.1 MHz (Bucharest); 100.9 MHz (Chişinău)

Programming
- Format: Dance Music, Electronic music, Pop music

Ownership
- Owner: ANT1 Group
- Sister stations: Magic FM, Rock FM

History
- First air date: 1990 (Bucharest); 1998 (Chişinău)

Links
- Webcast: Live Stream Romania Winamp; Live Stream Moldova Winamp
- Website: www.kissfm.ro; www.kissfm.md

Kiss FM is a Top40/Hit Radio station from Romania, owned by ANT1 Group. The station was rebranded from the old Radio Contact, after being purchased by a Belgian radio network, on 5 November 2003, but it began in Bucharest on 25 February 1990, and in the Republic of Moldova in 1998, în Chișinău. The rebranding came with a number of "on air" personalities, such as Șerban Huidu and Mihai Găinușă, the new network quickly got to be one of the most popular hit stations in Romania where it covers the main cities.

Kiss FM Romania also has a branch in Chişinău, the capital of Moldova, that broadcasts a mix between Kiss FM in Bucharest and local radio programmes.

On 23 December 2013 Kiss FM was bought by ANT1 Group after ProSiebenSat.1 Media AG sold its operations in Romania.

On 15 January 2014 Șerban Huidu left the radio station. He was replaced as Programs Director by Raluca Opreanu. The station's playlist manager is Andreea Berghea. On 10 September 2014 Sergiu Floroaia and Andrei Ciobanu joined the radio station as the hosts of the morning show.

== Romanian national charts ==
Kiss FM was responsible for the broadcast of Romania's national singles charts starting in the 2010s. The Airplay 100 was the country's national chart from February 2012 to November 2021, following the Romanian Top 100 which was published from 1995 to 2012.
