= Deepside Deejays =

Romanian band

- Also known as: Deepside Deejays
- Origin: Bucharest, Romania
- Genres: House, Electro, popcorn
- Occupation(s): Disc jockey Record producer
- Years active: 2008 - present
- Labels: Metropolitan Records
- Members: Dave Pryce
- Past members: Nick Kamarera; Vibearena; Victor de la Pena

The Deepside Deejays are a Romanian band formed in 2008 by vocalist Victor de la Pena, DJ Nick Kamarera, MC Vibearena and keyboardist Dave Pryce. The current lineup consists of Dave Pryce.

== Recordings and accolades ==
In 2009 the Deejays won the Best DJ Award at MTV Romania Music Awards, as well as nominations for Best Dance and Best New Act. In 2010 they won The Best Featuring Award. The Deejays also won Best Dance Project at Nights.ro Awards.

In 2011, the Deejays released the song "Never Be Alone", which quickly became a radio success in Romania and Russia.

== Members ==
Current members

- Nadir Tamuz - vocalist (2018–)
- Dave Pryce (Silviu Paduraru) - DJ, keyboardist, producer (2008–)

Past members

- Victor de la Pena - vocalist (2008–2014)
- Nick Kamarera - DJ (2008–2009)
- Vibearena - MC (2008–2014)

== Productions ==
=== Deepside Deejays ===
- 2011: Never be alone
- 2012: Stay with me tonight
- 2013: Look into my eyes
- 2013: Million miles away (feat. Dollarman)
- 2013: The road back home (feat. Viky Red)
- 2014: Wild Child
- 2014: In my heart
- 2014: Highways
- 2015: Forever 23
- 2016: Deepside Deejays & D. Damsa - Sing It Back
- 2016: Deepside Deejays & Dael Damsa - Maybe Tonight
- 2018: Faydee - More ( Deepside Deejays & BlackJack Official Remix)
- 2018: Deepside Deejays - Tu M'as Promis
- 2019: Deepside Deejays - Maya

=== Other productions ===
2015

- LALLA - Season of love
- Voltaj - De la capăt (All Over Again) - Eurovision Song Contest 2015
- Yamira feat. Mattyas - Waterfalls (Deepside Deejays Remix)

2013

- Dragos Chircu - Catch my love
- Andreea D - It's your birthday

2012

- Fly Project - Musica (Deepside Deejays Remix)
- Mari Ferrari feat. Deepside Deejays - We are young

2011

- Vanity – Gypsy Moves
- Amsterdam Avenue – Sick in Love
- Amsterdam Avenue – Far Away
- Mattyas – Missing You
- Mattyas - Secret Love
- Damon – Time Is Running
- Caytlin – Una Noche Mas
- Shahzoda – Afgana
- Kamelia - Dreamin' (Deepside Deejays Remix)
- Voxis - Tell me everything (Deepside Deejays Remix)

2010

- Amsterdam Avenue – Mysterious Girl
- Mojito Feat. 740 Boyz – Shimmy Shake (Deepside Deejays Remix)
- Speak One – Saxoclub
- Mattyas – Secret Love
- Dina Gabri – Naughty Boy
- Neylini – Share My Love
- Shahzoda – Dark Sea

2009

- Amsterdam Avenue feat. Dj Jungle – Destination Unknown
- Vali Bărbulescu feat. Damon – Inside of You

2008

- Nick Kamarera & Deepside Deejays - Beautiful days
- Geo Da Silva – I'll Do You Like A Truck
- Amsterdam Avenue – Blow It Up

=== Remixes ===
2010

- Fly Project – Mandala (Deepside Deejays Remix)
- DJ Sava & Raluka – I Like The Trumpet (Deepside Deejays Remix)
- Alex – Don't Say It's Over (Deepside Deejays Remix)
- Radio Killer – Be Free
- Vali Bărbulescu – Addicted 2010
- Alex Sayz – United As One
- Andreea Bănică – Samba (Deepside Deejays Remix)
- Jus Jack – That Sound (Deepside Deejays Remix)

2009

- Martin Solveig – One.2.3 Four (Deepside Deejays Remix)
- Ian Carey – Get Shaky (Deepside Deejays Remix)
- Dirty South – Minority (Deepside Deejays Remix)
- John Dahlback – Everywhere (Deepside Deejays Remix)
- Robbie Williams – Feel (Deepside Deejays Remix)
- Mike Oldfield – Tubular Bells (Deepside Deejays Remix)
- Housequake & Anita Kelsey – Shed My Skin (Deepside Deejays Remix)
- Thomas Gold – Just Because (Deepside Deejays Remix)
- The Good Guys – Circle (Deepside Deejays Remix)
- Fly Project – Alegria
- Danny Merx Feat. Majuri – Sunshine (Deepside Deejays Remix)
- Idriss Chebak & SKJG Project – Capanema (Deepside Deejays Remix)
- Soul Avengerz – Heard It All Before (Deepside Deejays Remix)
- Jay C Feat. Nathan Thomas – Multiply (Deepside Deejays Remix)
- Sonichouse – Beautiful World (Deepside Deejays Remix)
- Cream Feat. Fatman Scoop – Just A Lil Bit (Deepside Deejays Remix)
- Biank – Flashing Lights (Deepside Deejays Remix)
- Lili Sandu – Lee Lee (Deepside Deejays Remix)
- Fly Project - Raisa (Deepside Deejays Remix)
- Dj Rynno & Silvia - Huska (Deepside Deejays Remix)

2008

- David Deejay Feat. Dony – Sexy Thing (Deepside Deejays Remix)
- DJ Sava & Raluka – Sweet love (Deepside Deejays Remix)
- Aisa & DJ Yaang – Ready To Go (Deepside Deejays Remix)
- Activ feat. Dj Optick - Be free (Deepside Deejays Remix)
