= Sergiu Floroaia =

Romanian comedian

- Born: Sergiu Floroaia; December 1, 1984 (age 41); Bucharest, Romania
- Other name: Sergiu
- Notable work: Kiss FM morning show (host, 2014-2017); Stand-up Express (stand-up, 2013-2014)

Comedy career
- Years active: 2006-present
- Medium: Stand-up, internet, television, radio
- Genres: One-liner, Wit, Wordplay, Observational comedy, sarcasm
- Subjects: Romanian culture, human sexuality, pop culture, relationships, racism, human behavior
- Website: Facebook

Sergiu Floroaia (born December 1, 1984), known professionally by the mononym Sergiu, is a Romanian stand-up comedian and comedy writer. He is one of the first Romanians to be featured on Comedy Central Extra, with six comedy specials. He hosted, together with Andrei Ciobanu, the morning show on Romanian radio station Kiss FM (Romania). His style of humour is based on topical events, dark humour and the use of edgy one-liners.

Sergiu started doing comedy in 2006 at an open-mic night in Cafe Deko. His early influencers were Steven Wright, Demetri Martin, Jimmy Carr and later Anthony Jeselnik.

In 2013, Sergiu partnered with Andrei Ciobanu, also a comedian, and wrote "Unu-ntr-altu'" and "Mica rugăminte", two musical parody videos that became instant hits on YouTube.

== International career ==
Sergiu is one of the first two Romanian comedians, together with Toma Alexandru, to perform stand-up comedy in English on Comedy Central Extra. He was the opening act for Eddie Griffin in Bucharest for the 'Living Legend Tour' show.

In 2016, together with Toma Alexandru and Radu Isac, Sergiu Floroaia performed and produced "The Romanians Are Here" - their first show at the Edinburgh Fringe Festival in Scotland.

== Filmography ==
=== Television ===
Year	Title	Role	Television
2012	Sergiurnal	Himself (fake news segment)	Antena 2
2013-2014	Stand-up Express	Himself (stand-up special)	Comedy Central Extra
2014-2015	Stand-up Night	Himself (stand-up special)	Comedy Central Extra
2016	Comedy Club	Himself (stand-up special)	Comedy Central Extra
2017	Show de seară	Head writer (late night show)	Comedy Central
2018	Show de seară	Head writer (late night show)	Comedy Central
2019	Show de seară	Head writer (late night show)	Comedy Central

=== Internet ===
Year	Title	Role
2012–2014	Sergiurnal	Himself (host)
2016–	Podcast Ceva Mărunt	Himself (co-host)
2017–	Râzi ca Prostu'	Himself (guest)
2018–	Una Scurtă	Himself (guest)

==== Stand-up specials ====
In 2013, Sergiu teamed up with Media Pro to release his first stand-up special on the video-on-demand service Voyo.

Year	Album	Role	Notes
2013	Glumesc	Performer	Stand up
2019	Comics Jam #1	Performer	Stand up

== Awards ==
- Gene Perret’s “Words To Live By” Joke Writing Contest Winner – 2014
- Best Viral for “Who Are Sergiu And Andrei?” – Internetics 2014
- Best Viral for “Mă-ta are cratimă” (musical comedy video – co-writer) – Webstock 2012
- Silver in the Viral Category for “Cărți! Te fac neprost” (sketch video – co-writer) – Webstock 2012
- UGC Award – Tic Tac Fresh Comedy (writer & performer) – Webstock 2011
- Jury Award for “Cahfu” (animation – co-writer) – Grand Spoof 2013
