= Big Brother (Romanian TV series) =

- Also known as: Fratele cel Mare (Romanian)
- Developed by: Endemol
- Presented by: Andreea Raicu; Virgil Ianțu
- Country of origin: Romania
- Original language: Romanian
- No. of seasons: 2

Production
- Executive producer: Adela Harnagea
- Producers: Liviu Cristea; George Radu; Cristina Simionescu
- Running time: 60/120 minutes (approx.)

Original release
- Network: Prima TV
- Release: 16 March 2003 – 14 June 2004

Big Brother (also known as in Romanian: Fratele cel Mare, lit. 'The Big Brother') is a Romanian version of the international reality television franchise Big Brother produced by Endemol. A group of people (called the Housemates) live together in an isolated house. They don't have TV, the Internet, newspapers or watches. 24 hours a day, their life is recorded by hidden cameras in all the rooms in the House. The Housemates are completely isolated from the outside world. Every week, each of them must enter the Diary Room and nominate two of the other people for public eviction. The two or more housemates with most negative votes become nominated. For almost a week the TV viewers have to decide which of them to be evicted, voting via SMS or phone calls.

Every week the Housemates have a weekly task. Depending on whether they successfully complete the task or not, their shopping budget is increased or decreased.

During the final week, the viewers vote for which of the remaining people in the House they want to win the show. The person with the most positive votes becomes a winner and receives a big money prize. In the first season was the prize US$50,000 and in the second season was the prize €75,000.

The show in Romania lasted for two seasons. Both aired on Prima TV.

== History ==
=== Production ===
Prima TV acquired the format of Big Brother and announced on 2 December 2002 that it will be launched in the early months of 2003. A team of eleven people was sent to Budapest for the Hungarian version of Big Brother, for four months to learn how the show will work.

=== Spin-offs ===
Following the end of the first season, a show called Big Brother – Revanșa (lit. 'Big Brother – Revenge') aired on Prima TV, which consisted of several housemates discussing for half an hour what happened during their time in the house and what they plan to do after the show finished.

== Big Brother 1 (2003) ==
The first season started on 16 March 2003 and ended on 6 July 2003, lasting for 112 days. It was hosted by Andreea Raicu and Virgil Ianţu. The winner was Sorin Fișteag "Soso".

The house was located in the area of Semănătoarea.

In June 2003, Laura Stanciu, the spokesperson for the show, released a book which contains behind-the-scenes information about the season.

=== Housemates ===
Name	Age	Occupation	Hometown	Ref.
Adrian	21	DJ	Melinești, Dolj	
Alida Mocanu	26	Student	Ploiești	
Andreea Vasile	22	Student	Râmnicu Vâlcea	
Costel	27	Administrator	Jibou, Zalău	
Ernest Francisc Takacs	22	Student	Petroșani	
Florin Staicu	25	Ski and snowboard supervisor	Brașov	
Iulia	29	Economist	Baia Mare	
Izabela	25	Barman	Satu Mare	
Nicolae "Mumu" Covle	32	Administrator	Oradea	
Nadira	22	Student	Iași	
Sorin "Soso" Fișteag	21	Student	Reșița	
Violeta Ivu	24	Director	Bucharest	

=== Nominations table ===
Public nominations: The first housemate in each box was nominated for two points, and the second housemate was nominated for one point.

	#1	#2	#3	#4	#5	#6	#7	#8	Final	
Soso	Nadira; Violeta	Iulia ?	? ?	? ?	? ?	? ?	Costel; Izabela	Costel; Florin	Winner (Day 113)	
Alida	Nadira; Adrian	Mumu ?	? ?	? ?	? ?	? ?	Andreea; Florin	Costel; Florin	Runner up (Day 113)	
Florin	Nadira; Izabela	Iulia ?	? ?	? ?	? ?	? ?	Andreea; Soso	Andreea; Alida	Third place (Day 113)	
Andreea	Ernest; Nina	? ?	? ?	? ?	? ?	? ?	Florin; Izabela	Costel; Florin	Fourth place (Day 113)	
Costel	Nadira; Iulia	Iulia ?	? ?	? ?	? ?	? ?	Andreea; Soso	Alida; Soso	Evicted	
Izabela	Nadira; Adrian	Mumu ?	? ?	? ?	? ?	? ?	Andreea; Soso	Evicted		
Ernest	Nadira; Izabela	Iulia ?	? ?	? ?	? ?	? ?	Evicted			
Adrian	Nadira; Izabela	Iulia ?	? ?	? ?	? ?	Evicted				
Violeta	Iulia; Andreea	Mumu ?	? ?	? ?	Evicted					
Iulia	Nadira; Adrian	Mumu ?	? ?	Evicted						
Mumu	Nadira; Iulia	Iulia ?	Evicted							
Nadira	Izabela; Iulia	Evicted								
Public nominations	none	2-Mumu; 1-Andreea	2-Ernest; 1-Iulia	2-Violeta; 1-Izabela	2-Ernest; 1-Adrian	2-Costel; 1-Andreea	2-Andreea; 1-Izabela	2-Costel; 1-Florin	none	
Public nominations	none	Percentages Mumu; 27% Andreea; 26% Iulia; 5% Others; 42%	Percentages Ernest; 31% Iulia; 29% Izabela; 12% Others; 28%	Percentages Violeta; 31% Izabela; 22% Alida; 17% Others; 30%	Percentages Ernest; 27% Adrian; 25% Others; 48%	Percentages Costel; 32% Andreea; 30% Ernest; 21% Florin; 5% Izabela; 5% Alida; 4% Soso; 3%	Percentages Andreea; 32% Izabela; 32% Costel; 31% Others; 5%	Percentages Costel; 38% Florin; 35% Others; 27%	none	
Up for eviction	Izabela; Nadira	Iulia; Mumu	Iulia; Izabela	Izabela; Violeta	Adrian; Ernest; Florin; Soso	Costel; Ernest	Andreea; Izabela	Costel; Florin	Alida; Andreea; Florin; Soso	
Evicted	Nadira; 56.9% to evict	Mumu; 56% to evict	Iulia; 58% to evict	Violeta; 51% to evict	Adrian; 45% to evict	Ernest; 54% to evict	Izabela; 61% to evict	Costel; 52% to evict	Andreea; 6% (out of 4) to win	Florin; 12.9% (out of 3) to win
Evicted	Nadira; 56.9% to evict	Mumu; 56% to evict	Iulia; 58% to evict	Violeta; 51% to evict	Adrian; 45% to evict	Ernest; 54% to evict	Izabela; 61% to evict	Costel; 52% to evict	Alida; 17.6% (out of 2) to win	
Survived	Izabela; 43.1%	Iulia; 44%	Izabela; 42%	Izabela; 49%	Ernest; 43% Florin; 9% Soso; 3%	Costel; 46%	Andreea; 39%	Florin; 48%	Soso; 82.4% to win	

== Big Brother 2 (2004) ==
The second season was produced by Endemol and aired from March 13, 2004, to June 14, 2004, lasting for 91 days. It was hosted by Andreea Raicu and Virgil Ianţu. The winner was Iustin.

=== Housemates ===
Name	Age	Occupation	Hometown	Ref.
Aly	26	Real estate agent	Brașov	
Andreea	27	Student	Bucharest	
Ciprian Cavescu	27	Jurist	Galați	
Daniel Burcea	24	Barman	Curtea de Argeș	
Evelina	21	Barman	Bucharest	
Fily	29	Engineer	Drăgășani	
George	27	Financial analyst	Bucharest	
Iustinian Ghita	23	Painter	Cluj-Napoca	
Monica	22	Student	Râmnicu Vâlcea	
Raluca	22	Assistant manager	Deva	
Tino	26	Fitness trainer	Bucharest	
Virginia	29	Toy maker	Baia Mare	

=== Nominations table ===
	#1	#2	#3	#4	#5	#6	#7	#8	Final	
Iustin	Evelina; George	Evelina; Aly	Fily; Daniel	Evelina; Daniel	Daniel; George	Daniel; Monica	? ?	George; Ciprian	Winner (Day 94)	
George	Evelina; Tino	Evelina; Aly	Andreea; Fily	Evelina; Virginia	Virginia; Fily	Raluca; Virginia	? ?	Iustin; Monica	Runner up (Day 94)	
Ciprian	Evelina; Tino	Evelina; Aly	Andreea; Fily	Evelina; Virginia	Virginia; Fily	Virginia; Raluca	? ?	Iustin; Monica	Third place (Day 94)	
Raluca	Evelina; Aly	Evelina; Aly	Evelina; Andreea	Evelina; George	Daniel; George	Daniel; George	? ?	Iustin; Monica	Fourth place (Day 94)	
Monica	Evelina; Aly	Evelina; Aly	Fily; Evelina	Evelina; Daniel	Fily; Daniel	Virginia; Raluca	? ?	George; Ciprian	Evicted (Day 87)	
Daniel	Evelina; Tino	Evelina; Aly	Fily; Andreea	Virginia; Evelina	Virginia; Fily	Virginia; Raluca	? ?	Evicted (Day 79)		
Virginia	Evelina; Tino	Evelina; Aly	Andreea; Evelina	Fily; Evelina	Ciprian; Fily	Daniel; Monica	Evicted (Day 72)			
Fily	Evelina; Virginia	Evelina; Aly	Andreea; Daniel	Evelina; Virginia	Virginia; Iustin	Evicted (Day 65)				
Evelina	Aly; Tino	Aly; Daniel	Andreea; Fily	Fily; Virginia	Evicted (Day 58)					
Andreea	Tino; Evelina	Evelina; Aly	Fily; Evelina	Evicted (Day 44)						
Aly	Evelina; Tino	Evelina; Fily	Evicted (Day 30)							
Tino	Evelina; Aly	Evicted (Day 16)								
Public nominations	Tino; 26.3% Evelina; 22.1%	Evelina; 37% Aly; 26.9%	Andreea; 21.8% Fily; 18%	Virginia; 38.5% Evelina; 25.2%	Virginia; 58.9% Fily; 13.7%	Virginia; 31% Raluca; 16.4%	Ciprian; 20.6% Daniel; 20.2%	? ?	none	
Up for eviction	Evelina; Tino	Evelina; Aly	Andreea; Evelina	Evelina; Virginia	Fily; Virginia	Daniel; Virginia	Ciprian; Daniel	Iustin; Monica	Ciprian; George; Iustin; Raluca	
Evicted	Tino; 63.4% to evict	Aly; 53.5% to evict	Andreea; 58% to evict	Evelina; 61.4% to evict	Fily; 70.4% to evict	Virginia; 50.1% to evict	Daniel; 61% to evict	Monica ?% to evict	Raluca ?% to win	Ciprian ?% to win
Evicted	Tino; 63.4% to evict	Aly; 53.5% to evict	Andreea; 58% to evict	Evelina; 61.4% to evict	Fily; 70.4% to evict	Virginia; 50.1% to evict	Daniel; 61% to evict	Monica ?% to evict	George ?% to win	
Survived	Evelina; 36.6%	Evelina; 46.5%	Evelina; 42%	Virginia; 38.6%	Virginia; 29.6%	Daniel; 49.9%	Ciprian; 39%	Iustin ?%	Iustin; 51% to win	

== Reception and cancellation ==
The show quickly gained the attention of the Orthodox Church, claiming that they have warned the producers regarding shows which "promote prostitution and violence." Furthermore, the contestants in the first season were "shy" and "reluctant" to perform suggestive actions, with one contestant being dubbed "the girl with the cape" due to the fact that she wore a cape each time she showered.

News outlets believed that pre-recorded material was used for the first season rather than live recordings; their affirmations would be later confirmed by the show's spokesperson. The latter claimed that pre-recorded material was indeed used as it was "impossible to broadcast it live due to the bad weather at the time."

The ratings for the first season were "disappointing", as the show did not live up to the viewers's expectations, most likely due to the suggestions that the National Audiovisual Council proposed to the producers to "keep the show civil." To make things worse, the season's grand finale was eclipsed by the screening of the Indian film Yaadon Ki Baaraat on Antena 1. The show ended up, however, being a financial success.

During the second season, some contestants engaged in racy activities. Their actions were met with backlash by the Orthodox Church, the National Audiovisual Council and several political figures, which criticized the show for "promoting prostitution." The National Audiovisual Council also requested for Prima TV to show their decision for sanctioning the show due to violating the Audiovisual Act by "broadcasting pornographic content." Distrust was also created between the network and some viewers, who believed their online votes were not counted.

Following the sanctions imposed by the National Audiovisual Council, the breaching of autochthonous regulations and fluctuating ratings, Prima TV "did not see why they should keep a show like this with high production costs." After the show's cancellation, the network aimed to re-brand itself.

In 2014, Prima TV had announced that they acquired the format of Utopia, which worked similarly the way Big Brother did and that it would air during the fall of that year. Although, in October, Cristian Burci, the owner of Prima TV, stated that "the show will be scheduled to air either at the end of the year or next year." Subsequently, the show was "postponed indefinitely" due to the "financial issues that Burci was facing."
