= Prima TV =

Romania television channel

- Country: Romania
- Broadcast area: Romania; Moldova
- Headquarters: Bucharest, Romania

Programming
- Picture format: 1080i HDTV (downscaled to 16:9 576i for the SDTV feed)

Ownership
- Owner: Clever Group
- Sister channels: Prima TV Moldova; Prima Sport; Prima Sport Moldova; Prima News; Prima Comedy; Prima History; Prima World; Prima 4K; Agro TV; Cinemaraton; Cinemaraton Moldova; Medika TV; Nostalgia TV

History
- Launched: 17 December 1997; 28 years ago

Links
- Website: www.primatv.ro

Prima TV (Romanian pronunciation: [ˌprimateˈve]) is a Romanian commercial TV channel, famous mainly for the Cronica Cârcotaşilor show and various reality shows aired on this channel.

== Overview ==
Prima TV was launched as one of the first commercial television stations in Romania in December 1997 at 19:00. Until then, on its frequency was known AMEROM CANAL 38 or TeleAmerica. Prima TV was owned and operated by Prima Broadcasting Group, from 2013 to 2020. In 2020, Clever Group acquired Prima TV.

Prima TV reaches 87% of urban population and it is one of the four most successful TV stations in the country. Prima TV is available both on cable and satellite platforms. It was available in analogue terrestrial on channel 38 until June 2015, when it ceased terrestrial transmission in analogue. It was available in DVB-T from 2011, on channel 54, but shifted later to 59. In early 2015, it discontinued its existence on Digital Terrestrial platform.

=== Imported ===
- That 70's Show (2003–2004)
- The Bold and the Beautiful (United States) (2003–2009)
- 7th Heaven (United States) (2007-2008)
- Brothers & Sisters (United States) (2008-2011)
- Lost: Naufragiaţii (LOST) (United States) (2008-2010)
- H_{2}O: Just Add Water (Australia)
- General Hospital (United States)
- Blue Water High (Australia)
- Neveste disperate (Desperate Housewives) (United States) (2009-2010)
- Clinica (Private Practice) (2009-2010)
- Mediumul (Medium (TV series)) (USA) (2007-2014)
- CSI: Miami (United States)
- NCIS: Ancheta militară (NCIS) (United States)
- Jericho (2006 TV series) (United States) (2009-2010)
- As the Bell Rings (United States)
- Love, Inc. (TV series) (United States)
- Saved by the Bell (United States)
- Hannah Montana (United States)
- Cei 4400 (The 4400) (United States)
- Xuxa (United States)

=== Series ===
- Mondenii (Romania) (2006–2017 2022)
- Trăsniți în NATO (Romania) (2003–2009)
- Trăsniți (Romania) (2009–2021)
- Nimeni nu-i perfect (Romania) (2008 2015–2020 2021–2022)
- Secretele președintelui (2021 - prezent)
- Pup-mă! Înfruntarea bacilor (2022)

=== Cartoons ===
- Archibald the Koala (France)
- Timmy Time (United Kingdom)
- Pocoyo (Spain)
- Minunata Lume Disney (Disney Classical) (2008-2012)

==== Jetix hour ====
- Shaman King (Japan) (2007–2010)
- Totally Spies! (France-Canada) (2006–2007)
- Pucca (co-production) (2007–2009)
- W.I.T.C.H. (France-Canada) (2006–2009)
- The Kids from Room 402 (???)
- Sonic X (Japan) (2006–2007)
- June&July (France) (2006–2008)

==== Disney ====
- DuckTales (United States) (2011)

=== Shows ===
- Schimb de Mame (2003–present)
- O vreau pe Mama înapoi! (2007-2008)
- Super Nanny (2005–2008;2021–2023)
- Bătălia sexelor (2007–2008)
- S.O.S. – Salvați-mi casa! (2006–2013)
- Big Brother (Romania) (2003–2004)
- Banc Show (2000–2017)
- Nuntă în 48 de Ore (2007)
- Reuniunea de Clasă (2002–2003)
- Copiii spun Lucruri Trăsnite (2000-2013)
- Vrei să fii miliardar?, now "Vrei să fii milionar?" (2000–2003;2014)
- Te crezi mai deștept? (2007–2009)
- Calendarul anului, now Calendarul zilei (2008)
- 112: Poliția in Actiune (2002–2015)
- Trădați în Dragoste (2005–2017)
- Capra Vecinului (2008-2009)
- The Flavours:3 Bucătări (2004–2015)
- Experiența Americană (2008-2012)
- Ring-Ring (2008-2009)
- Levinza prezintă (2001–2015)
- Sport, dietă și-o Vedetă (2004–2015)
- Sport cu Florentina (2004–2011)
- Cronica Cârcotaşilor (2000–present)
- Ciao TV (2006–2008)
- Interviurile Cristinei Țopescu (2007–2017)
- Teo Live (2008-2012)
- Momentul Adevărului (2008–2010)
- Cireașa de pe Tort (2008–2022)
- Calculator prin România (2008)
- Megastar (2006–2009)
- PokerHeaven (2009)
- Vedete-n Figuri (Human Tetris) (2009–2010)
- Romania lui Gaiță (2009–2012)
- Prima TV Aniversar (every year, 17 December only)
- We Love To Entertain You (Original MusicVideo) (2008–2014)
- Click! (2014–2015)
- Dosarele DNA (2014-2018)
- Epic Show (2014–2020)
- Sector 7 (2014)
- Playtech (2014–2016)
- Amintiri din viitor (2014–2015)
- Historia.ro (2014)
- Nunți de poveste (2015-2018)
- Mama mea gătește mai bine (2015–2021)
- În bucătărie cu Horia (2018–2022)
- Starea nației (2018–2023)
- Flash monden (2018–present)
- Sănătate cu stil (2020–present)
- Alege Rețeta Națională (2020–2022)
- Selly Show (2020-2021)
- Darul Cărții (2020–2021)
- Insider Politic (2021–present)
- Hai cu Fetele (2021)
- Exclusiv VIP (2021–present)
- Poezie și Delicatețuri (2021–present)
- Destinația anului (2021–present)
- Ora de profit.ro (2021–2022)
- Florin Călinescu Show (2021)
- Din gospodărie în farfurie (2021)
- Coloana de direcție (2021–2022)
- Aventurierii gustului (2022)
- Primii câștigă (2022–2023)
- Viața are gust (2023)
- Spune-mi cine ești (2023–present)
- Delir monden (2023)
- Life & Style (2023–present)
- Cursa iubirii (2023)
- Minte sănătoasă în corp frumos (2023–present)

=== News ===
"Focus" is the television main news bulletin, broadcast daily at 18:00 EET.

- FOCUS (14:00; 22:00) (1997–present)
- FOCUS 18 (18:00) (1999–present)
- FOCUS SPORT (18:55) (1997–present)
- FOCUS METEO (1997–present)
- FOCUS LA PRIMA ORĂ (08:00) (2021-2022)

== Distribution ==
Satellite broadcasting via Intelsat 12 (45°E) stopped in June 2017 and was switched together with Kiss TV to Intelsat 33e (60°E).

== Sport competitions ==
- UEFA Nations League
