= Corbu, Constanța =

Corbu
- Commune
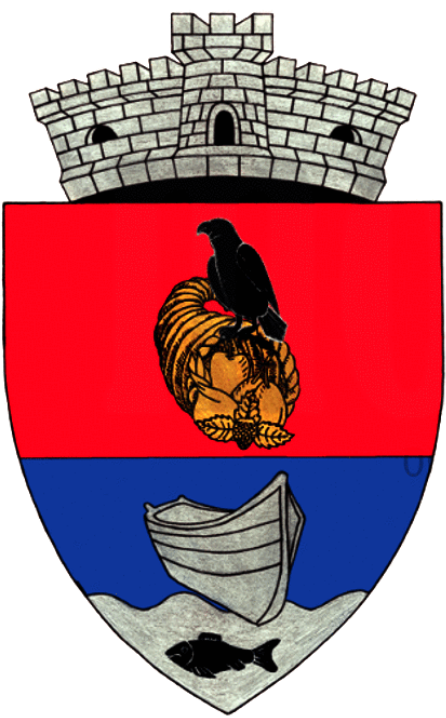
- Coat of arms

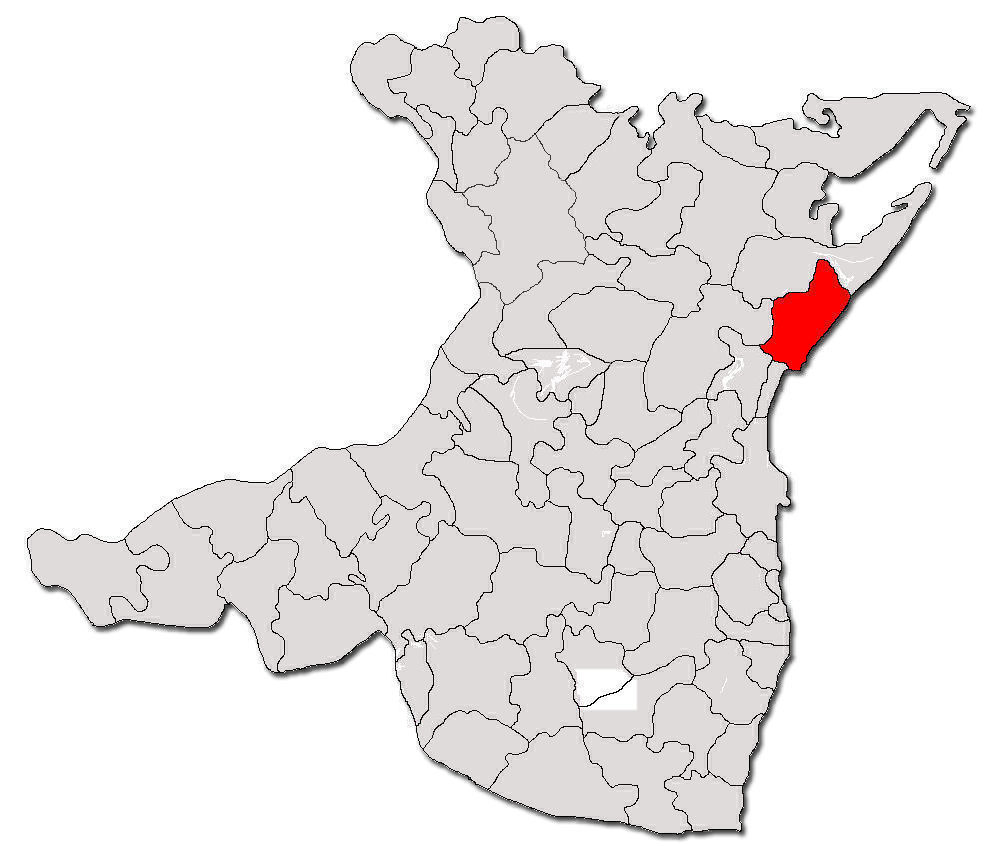
- Location in Constanța County

- Location in Romania
- Coordinates: 44°23′N 28°39′E
- Country: Romania
- County: Constanța
- Subdivisions: Corbu, Luminița, Vadu

Government
  - Mayor (2020–2024): Vasile Lumînare (PMP)
- Area: 118.04 km^{2} (45.58 sq mi)
- Population (2021-12-01): 5,727
  - Density: 48.52/km^{2} (125.7/sq mi)
- Time zone: UTC+02:00 (EET)
  - Summer (DST): UTC+03:00 (EEST)
- Vehicle reg.: CT
- Website: www.primariacorbu.ro

Corbu (Romanian pronunciation: [ˈkorbu]) is a commune in Constanța County, Northern Dobruja, Romania.

The commune includes three villages:

- Corbu - established in 1968 from the merger of Corbu de Jos (historical names: Gargalâcul-Mic, Turkish: Aşağı Kargalık) and Corbu de Sus (historical names: Gargalâcul-Mare, Turkish: Yukarı Kargalık)
- Luminița (historical names: Șahman and Urumbei)
- Vadu (historical name: Caraharman, Turkish: Karaharman)

== Demographics ==
At the 2011 census, Corbu had 5,396 Romanians (99.36%), 14 Roma (0.26%), 5 Turks (0.09%), 6 Tatars (0.11%), 3 Lipovans (0.06%), 7 others (0.13%).
