= Guess Who (rapper) =

Romanian rapper

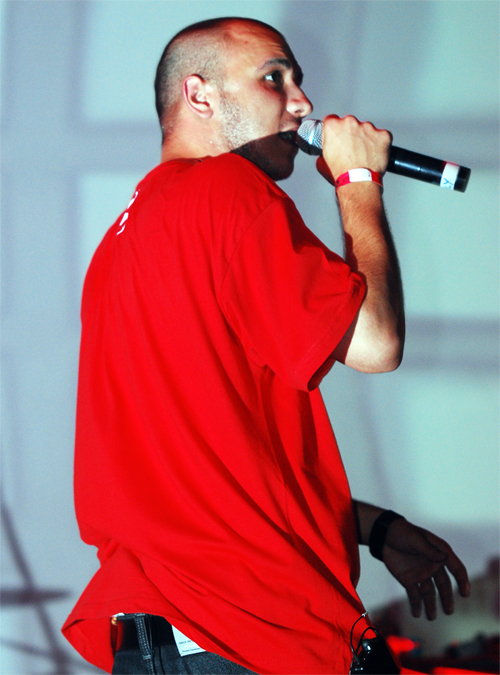
- Guess Who performing in Bucharest in 2009.

Background information
- Born: Laurențiu Mocanu; June 2, 1986 (age 40)
- Origin: Bucharest, Romania
- Genre: Hip hop • pop-rap
- Occupation: Rapper
- Instrument: vocals
- Years active: 1999–present
- Labels: 20 CM Records (2004–2007); Cat Music (2009); Okapi Sound (2007–present); Music Expert Company (2010–present)
- Website: www.guess-who.ro

Laurențiu Mocanu ((Romanian pronunciation: [lˌauɾˈent͡si͡ʊ mokˈanu]; born June 2, 1986), better known by his stage name Guess Who is a Romanian rapper.

== Early life and career ==
Guess Who (Laurențiu Mocanu) was born in Bucharest, Romania in 1986. As a child, he enjoyed sports and even played football for the Bucharest-based club Steaua.

Mocanu was also chosen by Disney to provide the Romanian voice of one of Ratigan acolytes from the animated movie The Great Mouse Detective.

== Discography ==
- Hai Să Vorbim (Let's Talk) (with Anonim) (2005)
- Probe Audio (Sound Check) (2009)
- Locul potrivit (Right place) (2010)
- Tot Mai Sus (Higher) (2011)
- Un Anonim Celebru (A Famous Anonymous) (2017)
- Un Anonim Celebru - Live la Arenele Romane(A Famous Anonymous) (2018)
- In labirint (Inside the maze) (2018)
