= Nemuritori (song) =

2014 single by Smiley

Single by Smiley

from the album Acasă
- Language: Romanian
- Released: April 24, 2014
- Recorded: 2014
- Genre: Dance-pop
- Length: 3:35
- Label: HaHaHa Production; Cat Music

Smiley singles chronology
"Criminal" (2013)	"Nemuritori" (2014)	"Oarecare" (2015)

Music video
- "Nemuritori" on YouTube

"Nemuritori" (Romanian pronunciation: [nemuriˈtorʲ]; "Immortals") is a single by Romanian singer Smiley from the album Acasă released as a bonus track on April 24, 2014. The song peaked at number thirty in the Romania Top 20 charts, spending six weeks there. The song was featured in the soundtrack of the 2014 movie Selfie directed by Cristina Jacob, in which Smiley played the role of a watermelon seller in Vama Veche alongside fellow artist Alex Velea.

== Music video ==
The music video of the song was released alongside the song itself on April 24, 2014, and was directed and produced by Smiley alongside Zazu Film, Cristina Jacob and Cat Music staff.

The video starts by showing main artist Smiley sneaking into the historic "Capitol Cinema" hall of Bucharest, looking back to make sure no one sees him. After he enters the venue, he makes his way through spider webs into the deserted place and finds several abandoned film rolls on the ground. He picks them up and plays them through the main projector of the hall. The movie shows a suite of scenes from the real life 2014 movie Selfie where three young girl best friends and high school graduates (played by Crina Semciuc, Flavia Hojda and Olimpia Melinte) driving to seaside by car as their post high-school summer escapade. The girls then appear to attend a concert led by Smiley himself in the very venue of the Cinema hall where he is watching the projection. The venue hosts a color Holi party attended by the three girls alongside their boyfriends and other people, all of them cast members from the movie Selfie. The crowd is shown dancing and enjoying themselves while listening to Smiley's performance. At the end of the video, Smiley looks confused over the sudden ending of the film roll as if he was living what he just saw playing.

=== Song concept ===
In the Romanian culture, together with the release of the Selfie movie who quickly rose to popularity, the song was received as a youth anthem. Smiley himself stated that the song was created especially for those people who, through courage and with the power of dreams managed to do remarkable deeds, thus winning their "immortality" (referencing the song's name) in the collective memory or at least in their circle of friends.

== Charts ==
Chart (2014)	Peak position
Romanian top 20	30

== Personnel ==
- Smiley and Kaan Gulsoy – vocals, production, arrangements
  - Text and music – Smiley, Serban Cazan
  - Video – Zazu Film, Cristina Jacob

== Release history ==
- 2014 Romania: CD (as part of Acasă) Cat Music 101 2797 2
- 2014 Romania: CD (as part of Acasă) Gazeta Sporturilor 101 2797 2
