= Dincolo de Cuvinte =

2013 single by Smiley

Single by Smiley featuring Alex Velea
- Language: Romanian
- Released: March 1, 2013
- Recorded: 2013
- Genre: Dance-pop
- Length: 3:34
- Label: HaHaHa Production

Smiley singles chronology
| "Cai Verzi pe Pereți" (2012) | "Dincolo de Cuvinte" (2013) | "Acasă" (2013) |

Music video
- "Dincolo de Cuvinte" on YouTube

"Dincolo de Cuvinte" (Romanian pronunciation: [ˈdiŋkolo de kuˈvinte]; "Beyond Words") is a single by Romanian singer Smiley featuring Alex Velea released on March 1, 2013. The song peaked at number three in the Romania Top 20 charts, spending thirteen weeks in there.

== Music video ==
A music video of the song was released on March 1, 2013, and was directed and produced by Smiley alongside HaHaHa Production staff.

The video starts by showing main artists Smiley and Alex Velea at their home in the morning preparing for a day when they were going to have a concert. They both exit their homes and ride to the respective venue. The video then shows a suite of cameos from various other concerts of Smiley and Velea in different venues while supposedly performing the very song of the video, as well as them getting interviewed by press, chatting with producers and other people backstage and recording back at their studio. Both Smiley and Velea narrate the lyrics while driving through town. The video ends by showing Smiley finishing recording the song at the studio after his took his headphone set off.

=== Song concept ===
The song, entitled "Beyond Words", is a heartfelt message itself for the fans and it shows the unseen part of the artist's life who sacrifices everything in order to keep their audience entertained and maintain a good bonding with them such as money, personal life or state of mind. Sharing a long-term friendship themselves, Smiley and Velea are reminiscing through the song's lyrics their younger years as artists when they were broke and puzzled. Smiley starts one of his stanzas by saying that contrary to his stage name he can sometimes be sad too. Despite all the anguish, he also states that life goes on and sometimes it's hard felt, and that we live it "beyond words" as they take the explanation back to the song's very title.

== Charts ==
| Chart (2013) | Peak position |
|---|---|
| Romanian top 20 | 3 |

== Personnel ==
- Smiley and Alex Velea – vocals, production, arrangements
  - Lyrics – Smiley and Alex Velea
  - Music – Smiley, Alex Velea, Rares Mititean and Serban Cazan
