= Aprinde Scânteia =

2018 single by Smiley

Single by Smiley featuring Dorian
- Language: Romanian
- Released: September 3, 2018
- Recorded: 2018
- Genre: Dance-pop; rap
- Length: 3:44
- Label: HaHaHa Production; Cat Music

Smiley singles chronology
"Vals" (2017)	"Aprinde Scânteia" (2018)	"Jumătate" (2019)

Music video
- "Aprinde Scânteia" on YouTube

"Aprinde Scânteia" (Romanian pronunciation: [aˈprinde skɨnˈteja]; "Light the spark") is a single by Romanian singer Smiley featuring Dorian released on September 3, 2018. The song peaked at number two in the Romania Top 20 charts, spending twenty weeks there.

== Music video ==
A music video of the song was released on September 26, 2018, and was directed and produced by Smiley alongside HaHaHa Production staff.

The video starts by showing several people at their respective jobs; a janitor working inside a school gym, a seamstress in her work room, an office worker at his desk and a waiter in a night club. The video also shows main artist Smiley performing the lyrics of the song while strolling downtown Bucharest. The song reflects over the potential of people to achieve more than they currently do. Based on the symbolism of the lyrics, the video shows the four workers suddenly getting startled by their inner children who scream when seeing their older versions becoming what they didn't actually wish for. The workers then reflect on their childhood hobbies. The gym janitor finds a jersey in the dressing room and puts it on, just to get reminded of his younger years when he was a basketball player. The seamstress creates a ballet outfit and enters a dancefloor, remiding herself of her younger years' performances. The office worker takes his BMX bike and strolls the town's skatepark only to recall his own childhood memories when he was a better rider. The waiter takes off his uniform and goes on the stage where he picks up the microphone and starts singing. He also recalls his childhood memories when he was singing. The video ends by showing all four workers happily ending their break from the daily jobs which they took only to give themselves a moment to remember what they truly enjoy doing.

=== Song concept ===
The song represents a statement to break out of the stereotypes, an exhortation for generations of young people to fight for their ideals, for preserving their own freedom to be and to choose. Smiley stated that he composed and recorded the song in only three days time, being one of the easiest to create songs of his career, explaining that he has created something based on his own feelings, something that he knew would quickly reach the fanbase.

== Charts ==
Chart (2018)	Peak position
Romanian top 20	1

== Personnel ==
- Smiley – vocals, production, arrangements
  - Music – Smiley, Serban Cazan, Roland Kiss, Dorian Micu
  - Text – Smiley, Dorian Micu
  - Video – HaHaHa Video Production (Iulian Moga)
