= Acasă (album) =

Studio album by Smiley
- Released: 21 November 2013
- Recorded: 2013
- Genre: Dance-pop; funk; hip hop; soul; rap
- Length: 61:36
- Label: Cat Music; HaHaHa Production
- Producer: Smiley

Smiley chronology
Plec pe Marte (2010)	Acasă (2013)	Confesiune (2017)

Singles from Acasă
- 1. "Acasă" Released: 1 November 2013

Acasă (Romanian pronunciation: [aˈkasə]; Home) is the third studio album by Romanian singer Smiley, released on November 21, 2013, by Cat Music and HaHaHa Production. The album peaked at number one in the Romania Top 100 charts with the main single, "Acasă", spending twenty-two weeks in the top 10 and twenty-three weeks altogether in the Romanian charts.

The album has won the 2014 Romanian Music Awards category for the Best Album. It also featured Dorian, Speak, Kaan, Alex Velea, Mihai Ristea, Don Baxter, Sore and Cabron as collaborators. The album's total of 17 pieces are equally interpreted in both English and Romanian languages. It also has a bonus track entitled "Nemuritori" (Immortals) released in the first quarter of 2014.

== Album story ==
=== Concept ===
The entire album was created fucusing on the main single, "Acasă". Made by HaHaHa Video Production, the video of the song places Smiley in the middle of nowhere, determinedly pulling a cart to a destination known only to him. The artist stops in a forest, in front of an unusual construction, which soon takes the shape of a house. In a moment of balance, however, a magician appears, like the ones in the stories. As the house in the forest takes shape, other determined and enthusiastic characters appear. The friendship shown by those involved in building the house offers the promise of a fairy tale ending. Smiley stated that both the video and the song were created to bring smiles and joy. The production's main aim was to remind people to dream, and be more optimistic and more confident in their own strength, Smiley added.

The release of the video, a co-production of HaHaHa Production and Cat Music, took place on the artist's personal and official site smiley.ro, the platform on which the "Acasă" album was available for pre-order around launch date. The same online platform also offers users the opportunity to listen to fragments of each track, to watch non-stop via live streaming what is happening in the HaHaHa Production studios, but also a mini-series that tells how the "Acasă" album was created.

== Other collaborations ==
The album "Acasă" got released in a premiere partnership with Gazeta Sporturilor, the biggest sports publication in Romania at the time.

== Track listing ==
No.	Title	Length
1.	"Can I Get A... (feat. Dorian)"	3:27
2.	"Acasă (Home)"	3:42
3.	"Hot In July"	3:44
4.	"Înapoi În Viitor (Back to the future)"	3:32
5.	"Dead Man Walking"	3:21
6.	"Pantofii altcuiva (Someone else's shoes) (feat. Speak)"	3:29
7.	"I Wish"	4:06
8.	"Letter To You And Me"	3:47
9.	"O Ard Trist (I act sad)"	3:47
10.	"Criminal (feat. Kaan)"	3:22
11.	"Pretindeai (You were pretending) (feat. Mihai Ristea & Alex Velea)"	3:53
12.	"Hi, Ce Faci? (Hi, what's up?) (feat. Don Baxter)"	3:28
13.	"Stupid man (feat. Sore)"	3:24
14.	"Conversație (Conversation) (feat. Cabron)"	3:43
15.	"Another Day"	3:36
16.	"Ne Deranjați (Do not disturb)"	3:35
17.	"Wonderful Life"	3:40
Total length:		61:36

Special Edition: Bonus Track
No.	Title	Length
18.	"Nemuritori (Immortals)"	3:35
Total length:		65:11

== Personnel ==
- Smiley – vocals, production, arrangements
  - Lyrics – Smiley, Dorian Micu
  - Music – Smiley and Șerban Cazan

== Release history ==
- 2014 Romania: CD Cat Music 101 2797 2
- 2014 Romania: CD Gazeta Sporturilor 101 2797 2
