= Jumătate =

2018 single by Smiley

Single by Smiley featuring Sore
- Language: Romanian
- Released: February 12, 2019
- Recorded: 2019
- Genre: Dance-pop; R&B
- Length: 3:38
- Label: HaHaHa Production; MediaPro Music; Cat Music

Smiley singles chronology
"Aprinde Scânteia" (2018)	"Jumătate" (2019)	"Song About Nothing" (2019)

Music video
- "Jumătate" on YouTube

"Jumătate" (Romanian pronunciation: [ʒuməˈtate]; "Half") is a single by Romanian singer Smiley featuring Sore released on February 12, 2019. The song peaked at number four in the Romania Top 20 charts, spending fifteen weeks in there.

== Music video ==
The music video of the song was released alongside the song itself on February 12, 2019, and was directed and produced by Smiley alongside HaHaHa Production staff.

The video begins by showing main artist Smiley inside an obscure room. The walls of the room show projections of endless staircases, moment when the scene switches to the other main artist Sore who is sitting on the top of one of the virtual staircases. Both singers are then shown defying gravity with special SFX by standing along studio decorations, with Smiley climbing up a set of stairs on the normal gravitational axis, while Sore perfectly stands on the opposite side of the countersteps. The video continues by showing both artists standing on a geometrically impossible bridge and into a rainy background, with Smiley putting up a red umbrella made from Sore's lower part of her dress. The video ends by showing them going up and down on a huge set of impossible white staircases while singing the lyrics of the song.

=== Song concept ===
The song's concept refers to the mixture of pleasure and sins, two components that are part of any love relationship. During an interview following the song's release, Sore explained: "It is said good things take time. We've been waiting for the right moment to make a song that represents us (herself and Smiley) equally. The song is half Smiley, half me, from the vibe, to the musical style, to the performance, to the energy".

== Charts ==
Chart (2019)	Peak position
Romanian top 20	4

== Personnel ==
- Smiley and Sore – vocals, production, arrangements
  - Music – Smiley, Sore, Serban Cazan, Florin Boka, Vizi Imre, Dorian Micu
  - Text – Smiley, Sore, Dorian Micu
  - Video – NGM CREATIVE & HaHaHa Video Production
