= Criminal (Smiley song) =

2013 single by Smiley

Single by Smiley featuring Kaan

from the album Acasă
- Released: June 5, 2013
- Recorded: 2013
- Genre: Dance-pop • electropop • hip hop
- Length: 3:22
- Label: Cat Music

Smiley singles chronology
"Acasă" (2013)	"Criminal" (2013)	"Nemuritori" (2014)

Music video
- "Criminal" on YouTube

"Criminal" is a single by Romanian singer Smiley featuring Kaan from the album Acasă released on June 5, 2013. The song peaked at number thirteen in the Romania Top 20 charts, spending ten weeks there.

== Music video ==
A music video of the song was released on July 4, 2013, and was directed and produced by Smiley alongside Cat Music staff.

The video starts by showing main artist Smiley laying beyond a nearly extinguished fire on the top of a hill with a girl standing over him by sunset. The action takes place in a rural desert area. Then the video shows Smiley and the girl riding their car, a 1969 Ford Galaxie possibly a couple of hours earlier to the initial scene, both of them wearing fresh scars on their faces. Then the cameo shifts to the beginning of the previous day in which Smiley stopped by a gas station. The girl protagonist quickly exits the station store with a presumably stolen bag and enters Smiley's car while the latter was filling up the tank. The girl jumps into the driver's seat and starts the engine, then floors it, leaving Smiley to hang onto it just in time to avoid being left behind. Everything happened under the eyes of two bums. As Smiley and the girl were speeding up, a pack of three black BMW E39s instantly came down chasing them. The girl does her best to avoid getting rammed off the road by the chasing cars, leaving Smiley confused as it seemed that he didn't know the girl, but helped themselves get away of the chasers. After this, the girl exits the car and showers herself with a bottle of water, then changes clothes, everything under the eyes of Smiley who was watching from inside the car, still confused but seemingly dealing with the strange situation as lyrics express his own thoughts of the girl turning him on.

The video then shows them stopping at a western-like bar with the girl visibly attracted by Smiley. She suddenly sits up and heads to the bathroom when one of the men sitting down drinking slaps her buttocks. She fights off the man by breaking the bottle against his head and also fights off the rest of the people from the table. The situation creates a huge mayhem at the bar as everyone starts an all-out fight. The bar scene shows secondary artist, Turkish rapper Kaan performing the rap part of the song. Smiley and the girl escaped the bar and headed towards a motel where they both hit the boiling point of their encounter and had sex with each other. The scene is suddenly interrupted by several men (presumably the chasers of the black cars) who barged into their room, beating up both of them until the girl pulled out a gun and fled alongside Smiley. The video then returns to the scenes from the beginning, showing both of the protagonists escaping the chasers for good and remaining together at the top of the hill drinking. However, after both of them went to sleep, the girl suddenly wakes up and leaves Smiley, moment which marked the end of the video.

=== Song concept ===
The main idea portraited by the lyrics and video of the song is the attraction felt by a man towards a bad woman. As shown in the video, Smiley thinks the thrill is worth the risk as the girl appears to thrive on adventure and feels commitment-phobic.

== Charts ==
Chart (2013)	Peak position
Romanian top 20	13

== Personnel ==
- Smiley and Kaan Gulsoy – vocals, production, arrangements
  - Text and music – Smiley, Serban Cazan, Kaan Gulsoy
  - Video – HaHaHa Video Production (Iulian Moga)

== Release history ==
- 2014 Romania: CD (as part of Acasă) Cat Music 101 2797 2
- 2014 Romania: CD (as part of Acasă) Gazeta Sporturilor 101 2797 2
