= Acasă (Smiley song) =

2013 single by Smiley

Single by Smiley

from the album Acasă
- Language: Romanian
- Released: November 1, 2013
- Recorded: 2013
- Genre: Pop • pop rock • electropop • dance-pop
- Length: 3:42
- Label: HaHaHa Production; Cat Music

Smiley singles chronology
"Dincolo de Cuvinte" (2013)	"Acasă" (2013)	"Criminal" (2013)

Music video
- "Acasă" on YouTube

"Acasă" (Romanian pronunciation: [aˈkasə]; "Home") is a single by Romanian singer Smiley which headlines the album with the same title Acasă, released on November 1, 2013. The song peaked at number one in the Romania Top 20 charts, spending twenty-seven weeks in there, and fifteen weeks in the most-broadcast songs on Romanian radio stations in the 2010s (and Top 100), topping them with number one two times. The song also peaked List of Airplay 100 number ones at number one two times, spending a total of four weeks in the respective top.

The song scored multiple nominalizations as the 2014 Romanian Music Awards. It has won the prize category of the Best Album with mother album Acasă. It was nominalized as four more categories: Best Male Artist through main singer Smiley, Best Pop Song, Best Song (as overall), and Best Video.

== Music video ==
A music video of the song was released on November 1, 2013, and was directed and produced by Smiley alongside HaHaHa Production staff.

The video starts by showing main artist Smiley pulling a junk cart after him in the middle of a crop field. As he continues his way, he enters a forest in which he finds a settlement made by him. This settlement is represented by a pile of junk items and a wooden structure of a future house. During his journey from the beginning of the video, Smiley was in fact looking for cheap pieces to finish his home. While working, he begins to struggle with the construction as he takes a break disappointed. Suddenly, a strange figure helps lifting one of the makeshift fallen walls of the house. The mysterious figure was revealed to be played by Antonio Satiru, a Romanian magician. The latter continues helping Smiley with the construction of the house and even keeps him entertained with card tricks. As the video continues, two kinds suddenly appeared and called for help. Smiley and the magician then went to find a paraglider stuck between some tree branches. The five characters then returned to the settlement and finished the makeshift house, taking a break afterwards. Suddenly, a beautiful girl representing Smiley's loved one appears. After acquainting the ones who helped him build the house, the couple remain the only two people awake, standing next to the bonfire and singing the last lyrics of the song before the video concludes.

=== Song concept ===
The song itself is a message for people who work or live far away from their home. As the lyrics of the song suggest, people shouldn't forget about returning home from time to time, no matter how far away it ts. The main targeted audience were people working abroad, as they received the song with most understanding.

== Charts ==
Chart (2013)	Peak position
Romanian top 20	1
Romanian Top 100	1
Romania Airplay 100	1

== Personnel ==
- Smiley – vocals, production, arrangements
  - Text and music – Smiley, Serban Cazan
  - Video – HaHaHa Video Production (Iulian Moga)

== Release history ==
- 2014 Romania: CD (as part of Acasă) Cat Music 101 2797 2
- 2014 Romania: CD (as part of Acasă) Gazeta Sporturilor 101 2797 2
