= Cai Verzi pe Pereți =

2012 single by Smiley

Single by Smiley & Alex Velea featuring Don Baxter
- Language: Romanian
- Released: October 23, 2012
- Recorded: 2012
- Genre: Dance-pop; rap
- Length: 3:38
- Label: HaHaHa Production

Smiley singles chronology
"Dead Man Walking" (2012)	"Cai Verzi pe Pereți" (2012)	"Dincolo de Cuvinte" (2013)

Music video
- "Cai Verzi pe Pereți" on YouTube

"Cai Verzi pe Pereți" (Romanian pronunciation: [kaj ˈverzʲ pe peˈretsʲ]; "Green Horses On Walls") is a single by Romanian singer Smiley featuring Alex Velea and Don Baxter released on October 23, 2012. The song peaked at number one in the Romania Top 20 charts, spending twenty-two weeks in there, and seven weeks in the most-broadcast songs on Romanian radio stations in the 2010s (and Top 100), topping them with number one three times.

The song was nominalized at the category "Best Message" at the 2013 edition of the Radio România Actualităţi Awards, coming out the runner up in the race for the prize.

== Music video ==
A music video of the song was released on October 24, 2012 and was directed and produced by Smiley alongside HaHaHa Production staff.

The video starts by showing a little girl sitting in her room. She suddenly finds a small crystal globe with a little house inside and starts playing with it. The plot then shows three main singers Smiley, Alex Velea and Don Baxter, accompanied by other HaHaHa Production label colleagues such as Speak and Ruby actually holding a cookout party inside the globe, in a children's playground-like landscape. The mood of their party from inside the globe depends on what the little girl from the real life does with the globe itself. During the video, the girl decides to go outside and puts the globe in a bag. Because of this, in the inner world of the globe, the lights suddenly get shut down and night falls.

As she strolls one of Bucharest's parks, the little girl drops the globe by mistake as it begins to roll down a small hill. In the inner world of the globe, an earthquake was generated. Then, the little girl finds an ice cream stand. She stops to buy a cone and leaves the globe to rest on the cold trolley as she waits for the ice cream. Then, the inner world of the globe suddenly gets wintery cold as Smiley and the other party people are forced to eat their cooked lunch in cold.

The little girl stops at her final destination, a bench from the Revolution Square where she connects the little globe to a public charger. Then, all the people in her proximity happily start looking up to the clouds. The video shows a satellite zoom-out which ends with the image of Earth. In the music video appears the future swimming star David Popovici

=== Song concept ===
The song's name of "Green horses on the walls" is in fact a popular Romanian expression used today with the meaning of fabrication, something unbelievable, fanciful, unrealizable, nonsense, something without a correspondent in reality. To dream, to walk, to speak, to listen - these are just some of the verbs attached to it. Contrary to the expression, the music video finds a way to connect the real life with an imaginary world.

== Charts ==
Chart (2012)	Peak position
Romanian top 20	1
Romanian Top 100	1
