= Dead Man Walking (Smiley song) =

2012 single by Smiley

Single by Smiley

from the album Acasă
- Released: May 31, 2012
- Recorded: 2012
- Genre: Dance-pop
- Length: 3:21
- Label: HaHaHa Production; Cat Music

Smiley singles chronology
"Dream Girl" (2011)	"Dead Man Walking" (2012)	"Cai Verzi pe Pereți" (2012)

Music video
- "Dead Man Walking" on YouTube

"Dead Man Walking" is a single by Romanian singer Smiley from the album Acasă released on May 31, 2012. The song peaked at number one in the Romania Top 20 charts, spending 17 weeks in there, and one week in the most-broadcast songs on Romanian radio stations in the 2010s (and Top 100). The song also peaked List of Airplay 100 number ones at number one three times, spending a total of five weeks in the respective top.

The song was directly endowed the award of the 2014 Romanian Music Awards category for the Best Album won by mother album Acasă.

== Music video ==
A music video for the song was released on May 31, 2012, and was directed and produced by Smiley alongside HaHaHa Production and Cat Music staff.

The plot starts in an unknown High School gym where Smiley wakes up hungover and confused late in the night the middle of dozens of sleeping people. In the upcoming seconds, the video starts to explain the situation as it shows that in the evening prior, there was a prom taking place inside the gym, with Smiley holding a concert. The video shows him in double, with one half of him being a mere participant of the prom, and the other half showing him as the concert lead singer. His unpopular half brings his girlfriend along at the party, and not long after, the girl is noticed by the other half of him who was already on the stage. Alongside the crowd, they proceeded in dancing all night and through the end of the party, the girlfriend dumps his unpopular half and leaves the prom with the singer half. The expression of a "Dead Man Walking" was proved by the mumble dancing style adopted by the crowd in the video, also hinting at Smiley's hangover from the beginning of it.

The music video represented a world premiere, being the first video to feature integrated elements of augmented reality, available at the HaHaHa Reality App.

The video also featured several of Smiley's fellow HaHaHa Production colleagues Alex Velea, Pacha Man, Don Baxter, Sore, Speak, and his Românii au talent show co-presenting partner Pavel Bartoș.

== Charts ==
Chart (2012)	Peak position
Romanian top 20	1
Romanian Top 100	1
Romania Airplay 100	1
Bulgaria Top 100	2

== Release history ==
- 2014 Romania (as part of Acasă): CD Cat Music 101 2797 2
- 2014 Romania (as part of Acasă): CD Gazeta Sporturilor 101 2797 2
