= SuperStar România =

- Genre: Reality competition
- Based on: Pop Idol by Simon Fuller
- Judges: Carla's Dreams; Marius Moga; Raluka; Smiley
- Country of origin: Romania

Original release
- Network: Pro TV
- Release: September 10, 2021

Related
- Idols (franchise)

SuperStar România is the Romanian adaptation of the Idols franchise and premieres on September 10, 2021. Originally announced at the beginning of 2021, the show is scheduled to start airing this Fall on Pro TV. Thus, replacing Vocea României, which was usually the Fall–Winter music show on the television schedule. The jurors of the show will be: pop-rock anonymous artist Carla's Dreams, pop-R&B composer and producer Marius Moga, dance-house singer Raluka, and pop singer-songwriter and producer Smiley.

The aim of the show is to discover the new music superstar in Romania aged between 16 and 30 years.

== Selection process ==
The aspiring superstars were able to register online on the show's website. Country-wide pre-selections started March 26 in Brașov and ended April 18 in Bucharest.

Date	Pre-selection venue	Location
March 26, 2021	Hotel Kronwell	Brașov
March 28, 2021	Hotel Golden Tulip Ana Dome	Cluj-Napoca
April 2, 2021	Hotel Ramada Plaza by Wyndham	Craiova
April 4, 2021	Hotel Boavista	Timișoara
April 9, 2021	Hotel Ibis Styles Dunărea	Galați
April 11, 2021	Hotel Unirea	Iași
April 17–18, 2021	World Trade Center	Bucharest

== Live shows ==
=== Results summary ===
Weekly results per contestant
Contestant	Week 1		Week 2	Week 3
Contestant	Top 10	Top 8	Week 2	Week 3
Romina Apostol	Safe	Safe	Safe	3rd
Maria Jugănaru	Safe	Safe	Safe	4th
Alessandro Mucea	Safe	Safe	Safe	1st (Winner)
Alexandru Precup	Safe	Safe	Safe	2nd
Maria Ojică	Safe	Safe	6th/5th	Eliminated (Week 2)
Naomi Prie	Safe	Safe	6th/5th	Eliminated (Week 2)
Victoria Peșterean	Safe	7th/8th	Eliminated (Week 1)	
Artiom Topal	Safe	7th/8th	Eliminated (Week 1)	
Ana Stănciulescu	9th/10th	Eliminated (Week 1)		
Daniel Șveț	9th/10th	Eliminated (Week 1)		

=== Live show 1 : Top 10 ===
Contestant	Order	Song	Result
Naomi Prie	1	"I'm Not the Only One"	Safe
Maria Jugănaru	2	"Când s-o împărțit norocu'"	Safe
Daniel Șveț	3	"I Got You (I Feel Good)"	Eliminated
Artiom Topal	4	"When Doves Cry"	Safe
Ana Stănciulescu	5	"Halo"	Eliminated
Romina Apostol	6	"Ziua vrăjitoarelor"	Safe
Victoria Peșterean	7	"Don't Speak"	Safe
Alexandru Precup	8	"Nina Cried Power"	Safe
Maria Ojică	9	"Always Remember Us This Way"	Safe
Alessandro Mucea	10	"She's Out of My Life"	Safe

=== Live show 2 : Top 8 ===
Contestant	Order	Song	Result
Artiom Topal	1	"Take On Me"	Eliminated
Maria Ojică	2	"Easy on Me"	Safe
Maria Jugănaru	3	"Fucking Perfect"	Safe
Victoria Peșterean	4	"Oh Mother"	Eliminated
Alexandru Precup	5	"Nothing Compares To You"	Safe
Romina Apostol	6	"Cry Baby"	Safe
Alessandro Mucea	7	"Kiss from a Rose"	Safe
Naomi Prie	8	"You Know I'm No Good"	Safe
