= Oarecare =

2015 single by Smiley

Single by Smiley
- Language: Romanian
- Released: April 23, 2015
- Recorded: 2015
- Genre: Dance-pop; swing
- Length: 3:53
- Label: HaHaHa Production

Smiley singles chronology
"Nemuritori" (2014)	"Oarecare" (2015)	"Insomnii" (2016)

Music video
- "Oarecare" on YouTube

"Oarecare" (Romanian pronunciation: [o̯areˈkare]; "A random") is a single by Romanian singer Smiley released on April 23, 2015. The song peaked at number one in the Romania Top 20 charts, spending twenty-one weeks in there and seven weeks in the most-broadcast songs on Romanian radio stations in the 2010s (and Top 100), topping them with number one on one occasion.

The song has won three prizes at the 2015 Romanian Music Awards at three different categories: Fastest rising hit to popularity, the Coca-Cola Award and the Kiss Award.

== Music video ==
The music video of the song was released alongside the song itself on April 23, 2015, and was directed and produced by Smiley alongside HaHaHa Production staff.

The video's concept resembles the cinematographic style of Charlie Chaplin filmography. The video was shot in early April 2015 in Bucharest Old Town and was edited at the Buftea cinematographic studios. It starts by showing Smiley exiting one of the old town's buildings and settling on the street just in time to start playing his violin. He was then suddenly startled by a small orchestra who also started playing their music around the corner. Upset, Smiley enters an unknown house where a fussy kid was waiting for him. The child quickly exits the house with Smiley chasing him while carrying a window glass on his back. The kid then breaks a window of a nearby store. Then female owner comes out to confront the situation, meeting Smiley right in time. He presumably tries to tell the lady it was not his fault as a patrolling policeman appears. Smiley then flees from the scene with the kid tailing him. He then arrives at his presumed home where a woman was waiting for him. She pushes Smiley onto a stage from within a restaurant. Smiley tries to improvise a dance number to try to keep the audience entertained but he messes up due to being extremely clumsy and reckless. He then takes his clumsiness again to the streets where he stumbles upon several groups of people annoying them. The groups of people are mostly played by HaHaHa Production fellow artists and actor Pavel Bartoș.

Through the end of the video, Smiley expresses his sloppiness again while trying to entertain a crying woman who was doing her laundry outside, while trying to enter a restaurant, meeting a priest and trying to embark into an old car. The video ends by showing him exhausted by his failed performances as he goes to sleep into a bathtub.

=== Song concept ===
The video of the song, directed by Iulian Moga and produced by HaHaHa Video Production, is a tribute to Smiley's favorite actor Charlie Chaplin. The idea of the clip came from Chaplin's silent films, as Smiley took on the skin of the most famous and nicest character embodied by Chaplin in Tramp. The team tried to reconstruct the character through Smiley's gestures, make-up, the specific costume: the wide pants, the tight jacket, the bowler and the famous cane, replaced by Smiley, most of the time, with the bow of a violin, adding the artist's personal touch.

Smiley also stated that "It's a song with a simple and positive message: to live your life with dignity, to enjoy what you have every day and to be good because it doesn't cost you anything".

== Charts ==
Chart (2015)	Peak position
Romanian top 20	1
Romanian Top 100	1

== Personnel ==
- Smiley – vocals, production, arrangements
  - Music – Smiley, Marius Pop, Alex Racovita Andrei Mihai Dorian Micu
  - Text – Smiley, Dorian Micu, Vlad Munteanu
  - Video – HaHaHa Video Production (Iulian Moga)
