= Las-o... =

"Las-o…"

Single by Vescan featuring Florin Ristei
- Language: Romanian
- Released: March 31, 2016
- Genre: Hip hop; pop-rap
- Length: 4:02
- Label: MusicExpertRecords
- Songwriter(s): Mahia Beldo (Music); Daniel Leonard Vescan (Lyrics)
- Producer(s): Mahia Beldo

Vescan singles chronology
"Al tău împiedicat" (2015)	"Las-o…" (2016)	"Tic-Tac" (2016)

Florin Ristei (FreeStay) singles chronology
"Altfel De Magie" (2015)	"Las-o…" (2016)	"Din Întâmplare" (2017)

"Las-o…" (English: "Let her…") is a song by Romanian rapper Vescan featuring Florin Ristei. It was released on March 31, 2016 as the second single of the XsessionMUSICVLOG project, which consisted of recording sessions that took place weekly in the Scandalos Music studio during 2016. The song's music was written by Mahia Beldo and the lyrics were written by Vescan. "Las-o…" is a Hip-Hop-Rap song where the Rap part is done by Vescan, being accompanied by Ristei who sings the pop-oriented chorus. The lyrics are written as a monologue of a male who advises his friend to let go of his girlfriend, after she has cheated on him. The song experienced commercial success, peaking at number one in the Romanian charts and the XsessionMUSICVLOG music video surpassing 43 million views on YouTube (as of April 2021).

The song peaked number 1 in both the weekly Romanian Radio and TV Airplay charts and won the Media Music Award for Best Summer Hit of 2016.

== Music videos and promotion ==
Two accompanying music videos for "Las-o…" were made. The first one was uploaded to YouTube on March 31, 2016. It is dubbed as the Xsession version and it features Vescan, Ristei and the band all playing the song. As of August 3, 2020, it's the most popular music video of the song, surpassing 40 million views. The other music video, dubbed as the Official Video was published to YouTube on April 19, 2016. It illustrates the meaning and the lyrics of the song with Vescan playing the cheated boyfriend. As of August 3, 2020, it surpassed 9 million views.

Vescan and Ristei performed the track live in Romania: on Radio ZU, on Radio 21, at the Forza ZU Festival, on ProFM LIVE Session and at the X Factor Romania.

== Credits and personnel ==
Credits adapted from YouTube.

Technical and songwriting credits

- Mahia Beldo – composer, producer, additional voices, mixing
- Daniel Leonard Vescan (Vescan) – lyricist
- Adi Colceru – mastering
- Alin Ilies – guitarist
- Bogdan Chiculita – violinist

Visual credits

- Claudiu Stan – director
- Iulia Dinu, Andrei – actors

== Charts ==
Chart (2016)	Peak position
Romania (Romanian Radio Airplay)	1
Romania (Romania TV Airplay)	1

== See also ==
- List of Media Forest most-broadcast songs of the 2010s in Romania
