= I Like (The Trumpet) =

2010 single by DJ Sava & Raluka

Single by DJ Sava featuring Raluka
- Released: March 30, 2010 (radio); May 20, 2010 (remixes)
- Recorded: 2009–2010
- Studio: Rappin On
- Genre: Electronic dance; House dance
- Length: 3:43 (radio version)
- Label: Cat Music
- Composer: DJ Sava
- Producers: DJ Sava & Connect-R

DJ Sava singles chronology
"September" (2009)	"I Like (The Trumpet)" (2010)	"Love You" (2010)

Music video
- "I Like (The Trumpet)" on YouTube

"I Like (The Trumpet)" is a single by Romanian singers DJ Sava and Raluka released on radio version on March 30, 2010. The song peaked at number one in the Romania Top 20 chart, spending twenty-five weeks there, and a total of six weeks in the most-broadcast songs on Romanian radio stations in the 2010s (and Top 100), peaking the lists on four occasions.

The song was nominalized at the Best DJ category at the 2011 edition of the Romanian Music Awards.

== Release and composition ==
Starting from the spring of 2009, the Romanian musician DJ Sava contacted the dance-house music singer Raluka in order to produce single discs. The collaboration of the two resulted in a first hit, entitled "September" and released in 2009, which enjoyed favorable reactions, both from the public and media. Taking into account the success achieved, Sava and Raluka continued their collaboration, and over the course of "a few days of recording" a new track, entitled "I Like (The Trumpet)", was produced. The song was produced by the Rappin On recording studio owned by Connect-R who also recorded some of the track's background vocals and supervised by Cat Music. In an interview for Romanian television channel Acasă, Raluka stated that "DJ Sava expected success even before the lyrics and vocals were ready... he liked the instrumental very much".

The release of the song which was officially titled "I Like (The Trumpet)" took place on March 30, 2010, on DJ Sava's website, but also on a few other online publications such as Libertatea and Kiss FM. However, promotion of the song's very own CD began in the middle of the same month, with the release of a sample of the song online. On 20 May 2010, the song "I Like (The Trumpet)" was re-released, with the new version of the single disc containing seven remixes. On the same date, the official cover of the hit, produced by Dave G.raphics was released.

== Reception and accolades ==
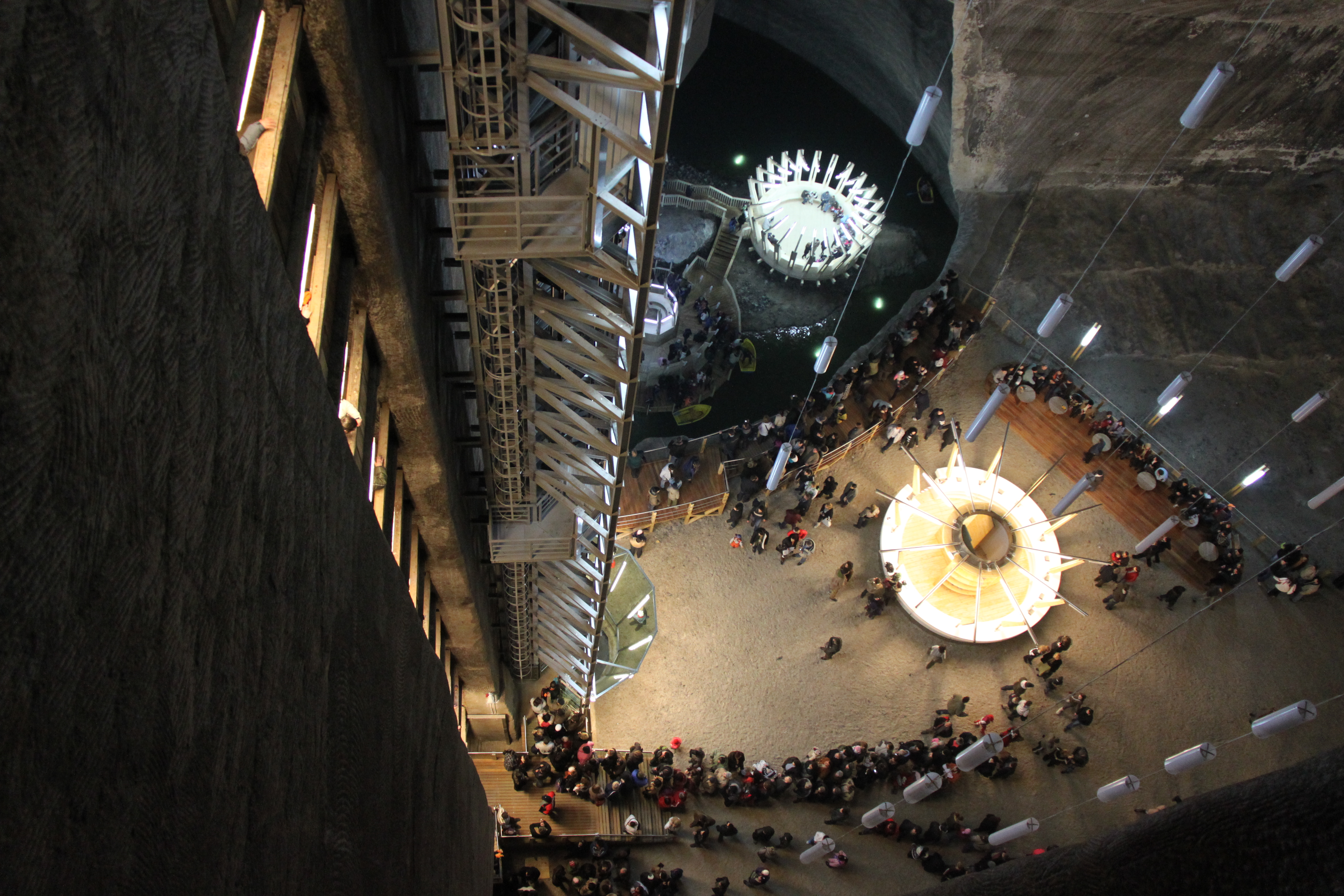
Salina Turda, the location where the video adjacent to the track was shot.

The perception of critics, fans and listeners on the song was generally positive. The Libertatea newspaper gave the single "I Like (The Trumpet)" a favorable review, claiming that the song brings up "a fresh sound and a very interesting beat". The same source nominated the composition among the "hits of the summer of 2010". Romanian magazine "Salut" shared the same opinion, stating the following: "Raluka has an amazing voice and manages to impose a slight change in style to the song". Other sites observed "an original sound compared to domestic club productions" and stated that I Like (The Trumpet) manages to establish itself from the first listen as a different creation in style, which, however, preserves the same popular nightclub house genre". Following the performance of the song from the Romanian morning reality show "Neața with Răzvan and Dani", the national online press remarked that "Raluka sang live 100% and proved once again that she is a very talented artist, full of energy and optimism".

== Music video ==
Since the release of the song, in the virtual environment, the song "I Like (The Trumpet)" has enjoyed success. A few weeks after its publication, the song had obtained over half a million cumulative views on YouTube. As a result of the success achieved, DJ Sava and Raluka decided to shoot a video for the song, which was to be produced in Ukraine. Contrary to the statements, the two artists filmed in Salina Turda in early June 2010. Directed by Dragoș Buliga, the video was officially launched on June 16 via the Libertatea website and has a predominantly military theme.

== Track listing ==
„I Like (The Trumpet)” (radio)
Defined by a predominantly dance-house melodic line, dominated by the use of a trumpet, the song follows the stylistic trends of 2010's consumer music.

- Official versions
1. "I Like (The Trumpet) (Radio Edit Version)" – 3:43
2. "I Like (The Trumpet) (Treitl Hammond Remix)" – 6:08
3. "I Like (The Trumpet) (Emil Lassaria Remix)" – 6:43
4. "I Like (The Trumpet) (Moving Elements Remix)" – 6:16
5. "I Like (The Trumpet) (Allexinno Remix Remix)" – 6:13
6. "I Like (The Trumpet) (Ext version)" – 6:02
7. "I Like (The Trumpet) (Vanotek Remix)" – 5:53
8. "I Like (The Trumpet) (LLP Remix)" – 6:31

== Charts ==
=== Weekly charts ===
Charts (2010)	Peak position
Romanian top 20	1
Romanian Top 100	1
Airplay 100 (Europe)	77
Europe Top 200 (APC)	136
