= Song About Nothing =

2019 single by Smiley

Single by Smiley
- Released: May 20, 2019
- Recorded: 2019
- Genre: Dance-pop, Reggae
- Length: 3:43
- Label: HaHaHa Production; Cat Music

Smiley singles chronology
"Jumătate" (2019)	"Song About Nothing" (2019)	"My Love" (2019)

Music video
- "Song About Nothing" on YouTube

"Song About Nothing" is a single by Romanian singer Smiley released on May 20, 2019. The song peaked at number thirty-five in the Romania Top 100 charts, spending seven weeks there.

== Music video ==
The music video of the song was released alongside the song itself on May 20, 2019, and was directed and produced by Smiley alongside HaHaHa Production staff.

The video was shot in Downtown Los Angeles in early April 2019. It begins by showing a pixel art look-alike cardboard of main artist Smiley's body coming out of a wall. The figure creates a tape recorder out of nothing and starts strolling the city, taking a walk into the park or dancing on rooftops. As it walks the streets, the cardborad body surprises lots of people who stop to take pictures or dance with it. Halfway into the video, the real body of Smiley appears singing the lyrics of the song. In the meantime, the cardboard body continues its journey through Los Angeles by meeting a couple of newly weds downtown, then strolling the Hollywood Hills where it meets dog walkers and then the Santa Monica State Beach where it shares a skateboard session with a kid and attends a dancing party with other random people at sunset. At the end of the video, the real body of Smiley joins the party.

=== Song concept ===
The song's main message refers to bringing out the joy of living and the feel-good mood. As the lyrics hint, a person can "make something out of nothing" when they feel good. In an interview following the release of the song in May 2019, Smiley explained: “I was always puzzled by the answer I got when asking “What are you doing? Nothing! This is the idea of the song, of doing something out of nothing. Actually, we all do something, even when it seems we don’t do anything.”.

== Charts ==
Chart (2019)	Peak position
Romania Top 100	35

== Personnel ==
- Smiley – vocals, production, arrangements
  - Music – Smiley, Șerban Cazan, Stefano Langone, Lee Anna McCollum, The Donuts (Sergiu Gherman & Tyler Mehlenbacher)
  - Text – Smiley, Stefano Langone, Lee Anna McCollum
  - Video – shoot by Jaakko Manninen and directed by HaHaHa Video Production
