= Sub pielea mea =

Single by Carla's Dreams

from the album Ngoc
- Released: 20 January 2016
- Recorded: 2015–16
- Genre: Dance, Pop, Rock
- Length: 3:28
- Label: Global Records, Warner Music Group
- Songwriter: Carla's Dreams
- Producers: Alex Cotoi, Carla's Dreams

Carla's Dreams singles chronology
"Te rog" (2015)	"Sub pielea mea" (2016)	"Aripile" (2016)

"Sub pielea mea" (English: Under My Skin) is a song recorded by Moldovan band Carla's Dreams. The song was released on 20 January 2016 and it is part of the third album of the band "NGOC".

The song reached number 1 in Romania and Russia. Also, it became the best-selling track in the Russian segment of iTunes and Apple Music by the end of 2016.

The song was nominated for the Radio Romania 2017 Music Award in the “Song of the Year” category.

== Title ==
The word #Eroina, which is also part of the title of the song, is repeated multiple times in the chorus of the song. The word "Eroina" itself translates as "heroine", but according to Amalgama, it can also be translated as "heroin" due to its complete consonance with the word "heroina" and similarity in the meaning of the text.

== Music video ==
The protagonists in a scene of the official video for Sub pielea mea

The video footage took place in Chișinău, in a theater room directed by Roman Burlaca. The video features Moldovan actor, Cristian Perepeliuc, and the girlfriend of director Roman Burlaca. The video presents the protagonists in hypostases that would suggest love scenes. The video begins with the two protagonists dressed as nerd students waiting for the elevator where the band's frontman is. They climb into the elevator and then descend and arrive in a room similar to a bedroom where they undress. Throughout the clip the protagonists are presented in all sorts of situations that would be similar to the love parties. The video ends with the soloist and the protagonists in the elevator satisfied, looking at each other and smiling at the camera. In other scenes of the video, the frontman is singing and dancing in the respective elevator is also presented. The video was uploaded to the band's YouTube channel Carla's Dreams and currently has over 86,000,000 views, being the most watched video of the band at this time.

The clip is inspired by scenes from the movie Fifty Shades of Grey. The site of the Romanian radio station Europa FM wrote that the eroticism of this clip attracted such attention of the audience.

== Releases ==
Digital download
No.	Title	Length
1.	"Sub pielea mea" (Original Version)	3:28
2.	"Sub pielea mea" (Midi Culture Remix)	3:48

== Charts ==
=== Weekly charts ===
2016–2017 weekly chart performance for "Sub pielea mea"
Chart (2016–2017)	Peak position
Belarus Airplay (Eurofest)	48
Belgium (Ultratip Bubbling Under Wallonia)	56
CIS Airplay (TopHit)	1
CIS Airplay (TopHit) Midi Culture Remix	104
France (SNEP)	60
Poland Airplay (ZPAV)	13
Romania (Airplay 100)	1
Russia Airplay (TopHit)	1
Russia Airplay (TopHit) Midi Culture Remix	131
Ukraine Airplay (TopHit)	8
Ukraine Airplay (TopHit) Midi Culture Remix	62

2018 weekly chart performance for "Sub pielea mea"
Chart (2018)	Peak position
CIS Airplay (TopHit) Midi Culture Remix	153
Ukraine Airplay (TopHit)	129
Ukraine Airplay (TopHit) Midi Culture Remix	58

2019 weekly chart performance for "Sub pielea mea"
Chart (2019)	Peak position
Ukraine Airplay (TopHit)	182
Ukraine Airplay (TopHit) Midi Culture Remix	188

2022 weekly chart performance for "Sub pielea mea"
Chart (2022)	Peak position
Ukraine Airplay (TopHit) Midi Culture Remix	150

2023 weekly chart performance for "Sub pielea mea"
Chart (2023)	Peak position
Belarus Airplay (TopHit) Midi Culture Remix	164
Moldova Airplay (TopHit)	181

2024 weekly chart performance for "Sub pielea mea"
Chart (2024)	Peak position
Moldova Airplay (TopHit)	74

2025 weekly chart performance for "Sub pielea mea"
Chart (2025)	Peak position
Moldova Airplay (TopHit)	44
Ukraine Airplay (TopHit) Midi Culture Remix	116

2026 weekly chart performance for "Sub pielea mea"
Chart (2026)	Peak position
Ukraine Airplay (TopHit) Midi Culture Remix	93

=== Monthly charts ===
2016 monthly chart performance for "Sub pielea mea"
Chart (2016)	Position
CIS Airplay (TopHit)	1
Russia Airplay (TopHit)	1
Ukraine Airplay (TopHit)	13

2017 monthly chart performance for "Sub pielea mea"
Chart (2017)	Position
CIS Airplay (TopHit)	89
Ukraine Airplay (TopHit)	57
Ukraine Airplay (TopHit) Midi Culture Remix	72

2018 monthly chart performance for "Sub pielea mea"
Chart (2018)	Position
Ukraine Airplay (TopHit) Midi Culture Remix	84

2024 monthly chart performance for "Sub pielea mea"
Chart (2024)	Position
Moldova Airplay (TopHit)	87

2025 monthly chart performance for "Sub pielea mea"
Chart (2025)	Position
Moldova Airplay (TopHit)	54

=== Year-end charts ===
Chart (2016)	Position
CIS Airplay (TopHit)	7
Russia Airplay (TopHit)	2
Ukraine Airplay (TopHit)	34

Chart (2017)	Position
CIS Airplay (TopHit)	160
Poland (ZPAV)	96
Russia Airplay (TopHit)	169
Ukraine Airplay (TopHit)	168
Ukraine Airplay (TopHit) Midi Culture Remix	155

Chart (2018)	Position
Ukraine Airplay (TopHit) Midi Culture Remix	117

Chart (2024)	Position
Moldova Airplay (TopHit)	91

Chart (2025)	Position
Moldova Airplay (TopHit)	57

== See also ==
- List of Airplay 100 number ones of the 2010s
- List of music released by Moldovan artists that has charted in major music markets
