= DJ Sava =

Romanian DJ and producer

- Born: Constantin Sava; April 3, 1973 (age 53); Buzău, Romania
- Genres: Pop, dance, electronic, popcorn
- Occupations: Record producer, DJ
- Years active: 1990s–present
- Label: Cat Music

Constantin Sava (born 3 April 1973 in Buzău), known simply as DJ Sava, is a Romanian electronic musician, DJ and record producer of electronic dance music. He started mixing in the early 1990s and eventually became the official resident DJ of a local club called "No Limit". Ten years later, DJ Sava went on a small promotional tour of the Romanian seaside clubs; in 2005 he signed a management contract with record label of Mr Ankit Chouhan l, which promoted his first two singles: "Gone Away" and "Remember". In 2007, DJ Sava came to prominence following his debut album Love Drops, which was a commercial success in Romania, spawning two successful singles: "Sunshine" and "The Reason".

== Biography ==
=== 1973–2004: Early life ===
Constantin Sava was born 3 April 1973 in Buzău, Romania and he began showing interest in music as a child. He started DJing professionally in the early 1990s and eventually worked as a resident DJ for ten years in a local club called No Limit; subsequently Sava went on a small promotional tour of Romanian seaside clubs. His musical activity intensified between 2000 and 2004, when he was given the opportunity to mix music in one of largest clubs in Costineşti.

=== 2005–2008: Career beginnings ===
Throughout 2005 DJ Sava recorded with Elena Pavel, a teenage Romanian singer. Initially, they made a couple of demo tracks. Shortly afterward, they released a single called "Gone Away", which subsequently helped Sava in signing a small record deal. The following year, Sava was searching for another female singer with whom to record his songs. His second single, which bears the name "Remember", features the voice of Dana Nicula, making her singing debut. The related promotional campaign consisted of a music video.

DJ Sava's debut album, Love Drops, was released in Romania in late 2007. Compiled under the auspices of Cat Music, the record contains the two singles promoted before, but also some new tracks with vocals provided by Connect-R. The album, whose cover was made by Vali Bărbulescu, also contains a series of remixes made by the artist himself. Simultaneously, Sava began promoting a new single called "Sunshine". A collaboration with Connect-R, the song was incorporated in a music video shot in Moldova. The record met favorable reactions from the public and gained high ranks in the Romanian, Bulgarian, Greek and Italian charts. The two artists continued their collaboration in 2008, when a new song called "The Reason" was released and received a video directed by Botea.

=== 2009–2010: Recent activity ===
Since the spring of 2009, Sava has been collaborating with the Romanian electronic music singer Raluka in order to record some new tracks. Their single "September" has received favorable reactions from both the public and press. In the wake of this success, the two continued their collaboration and after "a few days of producing" a new song was released in Romania. Called "I Like (The Trumpet)", the record was compiled in the studio Rappin On, owned by singer Connect-R, who also recorded some background vocals on the song;

DJ Sava's greatest hit to date
"I Like (The Trumpet)" (2010)
This up-tempo record was largely influenced by electro dance music and its instrumental line is dominated by the use of a trumpet.

During the same year, DJ Sava continued his promotional campaign in Romania, supporting a series of concerts in some of the best known clubs; simultaneously, the musician opened a concert for Tiësto in Chişinău. In late 2010 DJ Sava released a new single in collaboration with Raluka and Connect-R, called "Love You".

== Artistry ==
According to his own statements, DJ Sava's music was heavily influenced by a number of international artists including John Creamer, Tiësto and David Guetta. Commenting upon the release of "I Like (The Trumpet)", the reviewer in the Romanian newspaper Libertatea described the song as having "a fresh sound and a very interesting beat". Other Romanian websites wrote that "[the record] has a unique sound compared to other club music productions" and stated that "ever since the first listening, I Like (The Trumpet) succeeds in imposing itself as a different song as style, which however keeps the same popular club style".

== Awards ==
Year	Award	Category	Nominated work	Result	Note
2008	Romanian Music Awards	Best DJ	Sunshine	Nominated	
2008	Romanian Top Hits	Best DJ Hit	Sunshine	Won	
2009	Romanian Music Awards	Best DJ	The Reason	Nominated	
2009	Romanian Top Hits	Featuring – The Best Hit	The Reason	Nominated	
2010	Romanian Music Awards	Best DJ	September	Nominated	

== Discography ==
=== Studio albums ===
- Love Drops (2007)
- Cocktail (2013)

=== Singles ===
- "Gone Away" (feat. Elena) (2005)
- "Remember" (feat. Dana Nicula) (2006)
- "Sunshine" (feat. Connect-R) (2007)
- "The Reason" (feat. Connect-R) (2008)
- "September" (feat. Raluka) (2009)
- "I Like (The Trumpet)" (feat. Raluka & Connect-R) (2010) (Romania) Romanian Top 100 = peak 1
- "Love You" (feat. (feat. Raluka & Connect-R) (2010)
- "Money Maker" (feat. Andreea D. & J. Yolo) (2011)
- "Free" (feat. Andreea D. & J. Yolo) (2012)
- "Cocktail" (feat. Misha & J.Yolo) (2012)
- "Tenerife" (feat. Misha) (2013)
- "Aroma" (feat. Raluka & Connect-R) (2013) (Romania) Airplay 100 = peak 1
- "Aer" (feat. Raluka & Connect-R) (2014)
- "Bailando" (feat. Hevito) (2015)
- "Te Strig" (feat. Misha & Connect-R) (2015)
- "Amor a Monaco" (feat. Misha) (2015)
- "Love in Dubai" (feat. Faydee) (2016)
- "I Loved You" (feat. Irina Rimes) (2016)
- "Nena" (2017)
