= Carla's Dreams =

Music project from Moldova

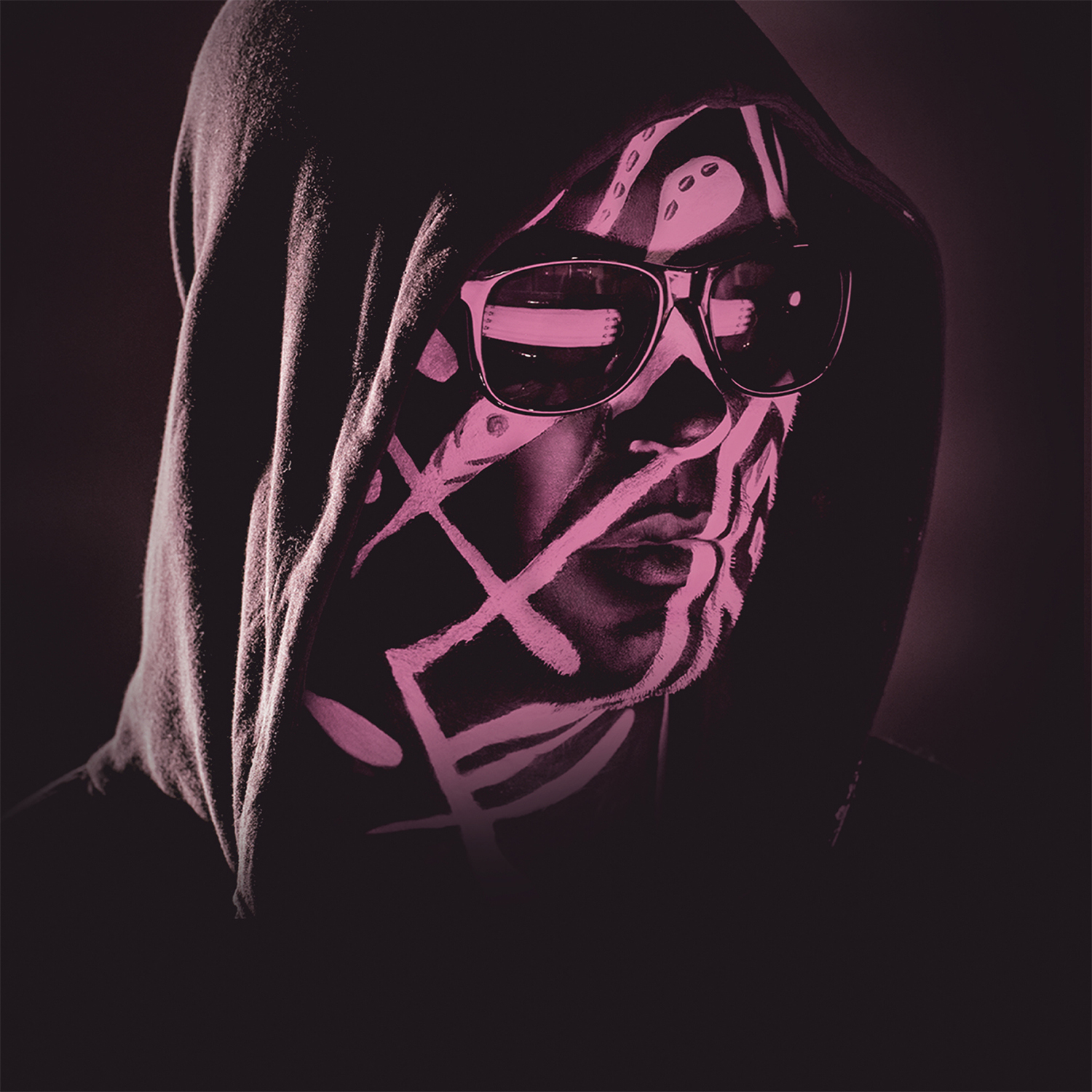
- Ngoc album cover depicting the lead singer

Background information
- Origin: Chișinău, Moldova
- Genres: Pop; rock; dance; EDM; alternative rock; europop; jazz; hip hop; pop rock
- Years active: 2012–present
- Label: Global
- Website: carlasdreams.ro
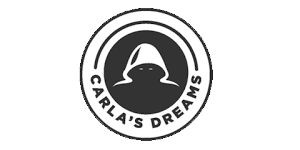

Carla's Dreams is a music project from Moldova, formed in 2012 in Chișinău but performing mainly in Romania. The band is composed of an anonymous group of singers and composers who perform their songs in Romanian, English and Russian. Their lead singer, codenamed Sergiu, and his bandmates all hide their identity in public appearances by wearing hooded sweatshirts, sunglasses and a face mask made of makeup. Carla's Dreams rose to prominence in Moldova and Romania upon releasing a version of the single "P.O.H.U.I." with Inna in 2013, and have since then issued nine singles that went on to be number-one singles in Romania.

== Career ==
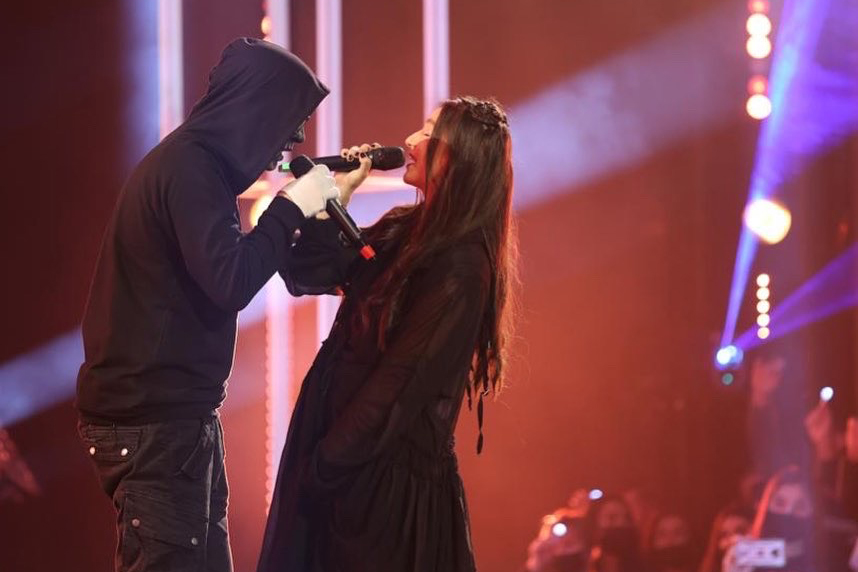
Carla's Dreams singing with Emaa at SuperStar România in 2021.

Carla's Dreams started its activity in Moldova; their name is inspired by the character Karla from the espionage novels of the British-Irish writer John le Carré. They released the album Hobson's Choice online for free on 4 May 2012. In 2013, they collaborated with Inna on "P.O.H.U.I.", which went on to reach number three on Romania's national Airplay 100 chart. Three consecutive number-one singles on the chart—"Cum ne noi" ("How We Us") featuring Delia, "Te rog" ("Please") and "Sub pielea mea" ("Under My Skin")—were included alongside "P.O.H.U.I." on the band's first major-label record Ngoc (2016). The latter single also experienced success in other territories such as Russia, Poland and France. In 2016, Carla's Dreams composed and performed the song on the soundtrack of the comedy TV series Atletico Textila, broadcast by Pro TV. In May 2016, the band released the album NGOC. The band also won eight awards at the Media Music Awards in 2016, and released their second studio album Antiexemplu (Antiexample), which included hits such as "Acele" ("The Needles") and "Imperfect".

From 2016 until 2018, Carla's Dreams' lead singer was a member of the jury of X-Factor, with him yielding the sixth season's winner Olga Verbițchi. In May 2018, the band held their concert Monomaniac at the Roman Arenas, and their lead singer became a juror on the show The Four. Another notable performance followed in the September of the same year, at the 18th edition of the Golden Stag Festival in Brașov. In October 2018, the band started their Nocturn (Nocturne) project, consisting of a series of videos directed by Roman Burlacă with links between them, all filmed during the night. Among the singles that benefited from a music video was the number-one hit "Luna" ("The Moon"). In 2021, Carla's Dreams released another number-one single in Romania, "N-aud" ("I'm Not Hearing") with Emaa. Furthermore, the song "Simplu și ușor" ("Simple and Easy") won the award for best song of the year at the Artist Awards 2021. In September 2021, the band's lead singer became a juror on Pro TV's music show SuperStar România. He also had a surprise appearance on the show Masked Singer România, where he competed as an emoji.

The artist was chosen to dub Nassor character in the animated movie Frankenweenie produced by Walt Disney Pictures.

== Discography ==
=== Studio albums ===
List of major-label studio albums
Title	Album details
Hobson's Choice	Released: 4 May 2012; Label: N/A; Formats: digital download
Da. Nu. Na.	Released: 2014; Label: N/A; Formats: digital download
Ngoc	Released: 7 May 2016; Label: Global Records; Formats: CD, digital download
Antiexemplu	Released: 13 May 2017; Label: Global Records; Formats: CD, digital download
Nocturn	Released: 16 September 2019; Label: Global Records; Formats: CD, digital download

=== Singles ===
==== As lead artist ====
List of singles as lead artist, with selected chart positions
Title	Year	Peak chart positions							Album
Title	Year	MDA Air.	CIS	FRA	POL	ROM (Note: Airplay charts published by Uniunea Producătorilor de Fonograme din România (UPFR) and streaming and digital download-based rankings issued by Billboard are taken into consideration after national chart Airplay 100 was cancelled in November 2021.)	RUS	UKR	Album
"P.O.H.U.I." (featuring Inna)	2013	7	—	—	—	3	—	—	Ngoc / Party Never Ends (Note: "P.O.H.U.I." was only present on the Romanian bonus tracks edition of Party Never Ends.)
"Lumea ta" (featuring Loredana)	2013	—	—	—	—	30	—	—	Ngoc / Imaginarium
"Cum ne noi" (featuring Delia)	2015	—	—	—	—	1	—	—	Ngoc
"Te rog"	2015	—	—	—	—	1	—	—	Ngoc
"Sub pielea mea"	2016	—	1 (Note: The Midi Culture remix of "Sub pielea mea" also reached number 133.)	60	13	1	1	7	Ngoc
"Acele"	2016	—	—	—	—	1	—	—	Antiexemplu
"Imperfect"	2016	—	—	—	—	1	—	—	Antiexemplu
"Antiexemplu"	2017	—	—	—	—	11	—	—	Antiexemplu
"Tu și eu" (featuring Inna)	2017	—	—	—	—	53	—	—	Antiexemplu / Nirvana
"Până la sânge"	2017	—	—	—	—	1	—	—	Antiexemplu
"Beretta"	2017	—	—	—	—	2	—	—	Non-album singles
"Lacrimi și pumni în pereți"	2018	—	—	—	—	1	—	—	Non-album singles
"Luna"	2018	—	—	—	—	1	—	—	Non-album singles
"Ne topim"	2019	—	—	—	—	9	—	—	Non-album singles
"Baila Conmigo" (with Blacklist)	2019	—	—	—	—	66	—	—	Non-album singles
"Seară de seară"	2019	—	—	—	—	4	—	—	Non-album singles
"Secrete"	2020	—	—	—	—	8	—	—	Non-album singles
"Scara 2, etajul 7"	2020	—	—	—	—	3	—	—	Non-album singles
"Simplu și ușor"	2020	—	—	—	—	3	—	—	Non-album singles
"N-aud" (with Emaa)	2021	—	137	—	—	1	—	—	Non-album singles
"Victima"	2022	—	—	—	—	2	—	—	Non-album singles
"Înapoi"	2022	—	—	—	—	7	—	—	Non-album singles
"ae"	2023	—	—	—	—	—	—	—	Non-album singles
"—" denotes a recording that did not chart or was not released in that territory.

==== As featured artist ====
List of singles as featured artist, with selected chart positions
Title	Year	Peak chart positions		Album
Title	Year	MDA Air.	ROM	Album
"Жить Выбираем" (Dara featuring Carla's Dreams)	2012	—	—	Non-album singles
"Fie ce-o fi" (with Dara featuring Inna, Antonia and Carla's Dreams)	2014	4	55	Non-album singles
"Sună-mă" (Antonia featuring Carla's Dreams)	2016	—	28	Ngoc
"Tequila" (Blacklist featuring Carla's Dreams)	2017	—	2	Non-album singles
"Bambolina" (Killa Fonic featuring Carla's Dreams)	2019	—	2	Non-album singles
"3 inimi" (with Irina Rimes)	2020	—	15	Non-album singles
"Din Cauza Ta" (with Nicole Cherry)	2023	—	7	Non-album singles
"Noaptea la 3" (with Satoshi)	2023	16	—	Non-album singles
"—" denotes a recording that did not chart or was not released in that territory.

==== Promotional singles ====
List of promotional singles
Title	Year	Album
"Funeral Face (66 Inches)"	2013	Ngoc
"Прощай"	2014	Non-album single
"Aripile"	2016	Ngoc
"Unde"	2016	Antiexemplu
"Треугольники"	2016	Antiexemplu
"Ne bucurăm în ciuda lor"	2016	Antiexemplu
"Dragostea din plic"	2017	Non-album single
"Anti CSD"	2017	Antiexemplu
"Frica"	2017	Non-album single
"Formula apei"	2017	Antiexemplu
"Animal de pradă"	2017	Antiexemplu
"Inima" (featuring Delia)	2017	Antiexemplu
"413"	2018	Non-album singles
"17 ani"	2018	Non-album singles
"Pe umerii tăi slabi"	2018	Non-album singles
"Poetic și murdar"	2018	Non-album singles
"Monomaniac"	2018	Non-album singles
"Praf de stele"	2018	Nocturn
"Ca benzina"	2018	Nocturn
"Karma"	2018	Nocturn
"Regina goală"	2018	Nocturn
"CRV"	2018	Nocturn
"Itsova"	2019	Nocturn
"Te-ascund în vise"	2019	Nocturn
"Dependent"	2019	Nocturn
"Gust amar"	2019	Nocturn
"Anxietate" (featuring Antonia)	2019	Nocturn
"Aici" (with Inna, Irina Rimes & The Motans)	2021	Non-album single

== Awards and nominations ==
Name of the award ceremony, year presented, award category, recipient and the result of the nomination
Year	Award	Category	Recipient	Result	Ref.
2016	Media Music Awards	Best Group	Carla's Dreams	Won	
2016	Media Music Awards	Most Wanted Artist	Carla's Dreams	Won	
2016	Media Music Awards	Best Song	"Te rog"	Won	
2016	Media Music Awards	Media Forest Award	"Te rog"	Won	
2016	Media Music Awards	Best Video	"Te rog"	Won	
2016	Media Music Awards	Winter Hit	"Te rog"	Won	
2016	Media Music Awards	Best YouTube	"Sub pielea mea"	Won	
2017	Media Music Awards	Best Group	Carla's Dreams	Won	
2017	Media Music Awards	Best Song	"Imperfect"	Won	
2017	Media Music Awards	Summer Hit	"Până la sânge"	Won	
2017	Media Music Awards	Spring Hit	"Antiexemplu"	Won	
2017	Radar de Media Awards	The Artist	Carla's Dreams	Nominated	
2017	Radar de Media Awards	Best Song	"Imperfect"	Nominated	
2017	Radar de Media Awards	Best Song	"Acele"	Nominated	
2017	Radar de Media Awards	Best Song	"Sub pielea mea"	Nominated	
2017	Radar de Media Awards	Best Song	"Sună-mă"	Nominated	
2018	Radar de Media Awards	The Artist	Carla's Dreams	Won	
2018	Radar de Media Awards	Best Song	"Până la sânge"	Nominated	
2018	Radar de Media Awards	Best Song	"Beretta"	Nominated	
2018	Radar de Media Awards	Best Song	"Tequila"	Nominated	
2019	Radar de Media Awards				
2019	Radar de Media Awards	The Artist	Carla's Dreams	Nominated	

== Songwriting credits ==
List of songwriting credits
Title	Year	Artist	Album	Ref.
"Da, mamă"	2015	Delia	Deliria	
"Nu caut iubiri"	2016	Ruby featuring Uzzi	Non-album singles	
"Amintiri"	2016	Nicoleta Nucă	Non-album singles	
"Când pleci"	2017	Nicoleta Nucă	Non-album singles	
"Fata lu' tata"	2020	Delia	7	

== See also ==
- List of music released by Moldovan artists that has charted in major music markets
