= List of Media Forest most-broadcast songs of the 2010s in Romania =

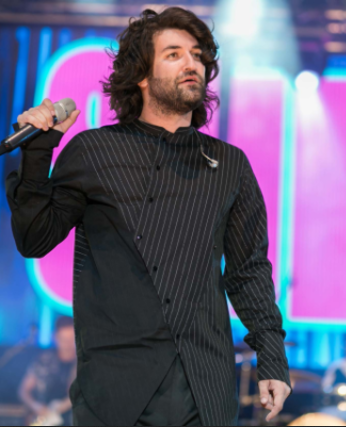
Smiley (pictured) and Carla's Dreams both had eight songs listed as the most-broadcast on radio and television during the 2010s, more than any other act.

Since July 2009, Israeli broadcast monitoring service Media Forest has been publishing four rankings which list the top ten most-broadcast Romanian and foreign songs on Romanian radio stations and television channels separately on a weekly basis. The charts consider data from eight radio stations—Digi FM, Europa FM, Kiss FM, Magic FM, Pro FM, Radio ZU, Radio România Actualități and Virgin Radio Romania—and five television channels—1 Music Channel, Kiss TV, MTV Romania, UTV Romania and ZU TV. Chart placings are based on the number of times tracks are broadcast, determined by acoustic fingerprinting.

Media Forest also releases year-end charts in regards to the radio airplay, listing the most-broadcast songs of Romanian origin (Note: Media Forest also includes Moldovan artists such as Carla's Dreams and the Motans on the chart.) of the respective year, weighted by the official audience numbers provided by Asociația pentru Radio Audiență (Romanian Association for Audience Numbers). During the 2010s, around 200 singles each were listed by Media Forest as the most-broadcast tracks on radio and television respectively. The first were "I Gotta Feeling" by the Black Eyed Peas (radio) and "Chica Bomb" by Dan Balan (television).

"Shoulda" by Jamie Woon spent an unprecedented 20 weeks as the most-broadcast single on radio stations, while in terms of television airplay, this feat was achieved by "Luna" by Carla's Dreams with a total of 15 weeks. Carla's Dreams and Smiley had eight songs listed as the most-broadcast on radio and television during the 2010s, more than any other act. "Dance Monkey" by Tones and I was the final top song of the 2010s on both listings. In terms of radio airplay, reports by Media Forest indicate that Cat Music was the most successful label of 2017; Global Records claimed that accolade in 2018 and 2019. Kiss FM, Pro FM and Virgin Radio Romania were the trendsetting radio stations in those years respectively, meaning they broadcast Media Forest's top weekly radio songs the most.

== Most-broadcast songs ==
Key
‡	Indicates number-one Romanian song of the year (Note: "My Beautiful One" by Xonia and Deepcentral, "Dă vina pe Voltaj" by Voltaj, "Emoții" by 3 Sud Est, and "Weekend" by the Motans and Delia Matache topped Media Forest's year-end charts in 2010, 2012, 2014 and 2017, respectively, although they were not listed as the most-broadcast songs on the weekly charts.)
❍	Indicates song that topped the Romanian listing and was the most-broadcast overall
◁	Indicates song that topped the foreign listing and was the most-broadcast overall

=== Radio ===
Summaries (radio)
By song
Artist(s)	Title	Wks. (Note: Total weeks at number one are counted.)
Jamie Woon	"Shoulda"	20
Smiley	"Acasă"	15
Delia Matache featuring Kaira	"Pe aripi de vânt"	14
Lykke Li	"I Follow Rivers (The Magician Remix)"	12
Ed Sheeran	"I See Fire"	11
Nicky Jam and Enrique Iglesias	"El Perdón"	10
Smiley	"Vals"	10
Carla's Dreams	"Luna"	9
Alb Negru featuring Raflo & Rareș	"Mi-e sete de tine"	9
Carla's Dreams	"Până la sânge"	9
Vama	"Perfect fără tine"	9
The Motans featuring Irina Rimes	"Poem"	9
Ed Sheeran	"Shape of You"	9
Play & Win	"Ya BB"	9
By artist
Artist (Note: Entries both as lead and featured artist are counted.)		No.
Carla's Dreams		8
Smiley		8
Rihanna		5
Andra		4
Ed Sheeran		4
Cabron		3
Delia Matache		3
Sia		3

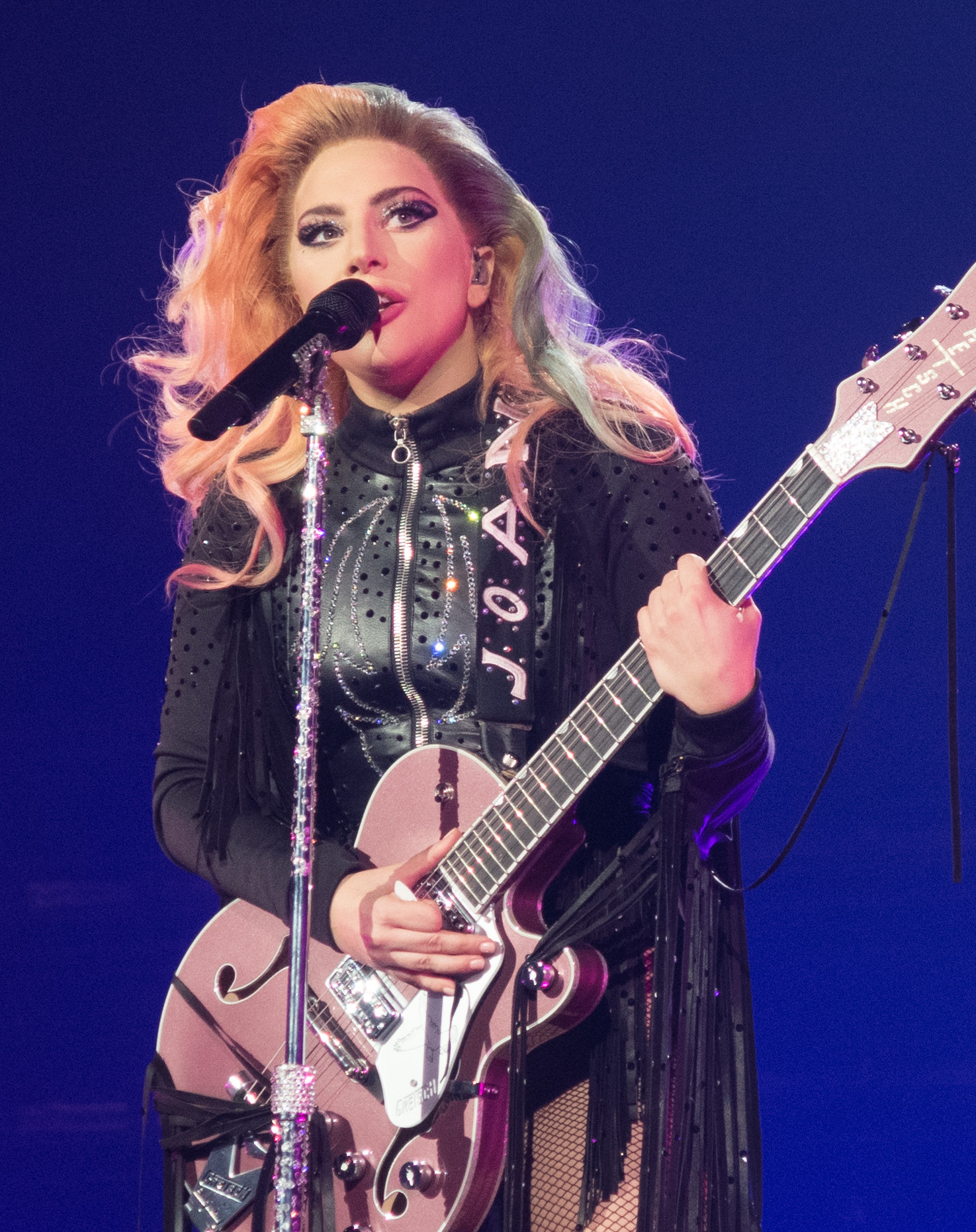
"Bad Romance" and "Alejandro" by Lady Gaga were both listed as the most-broadcast songs on radio during 2010.

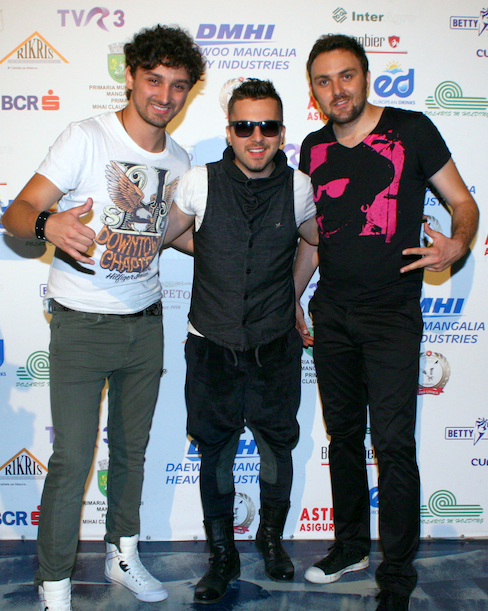
"Ya BB", released by Play & Win, reached number one on Media Forest's year-end chart in 2010.

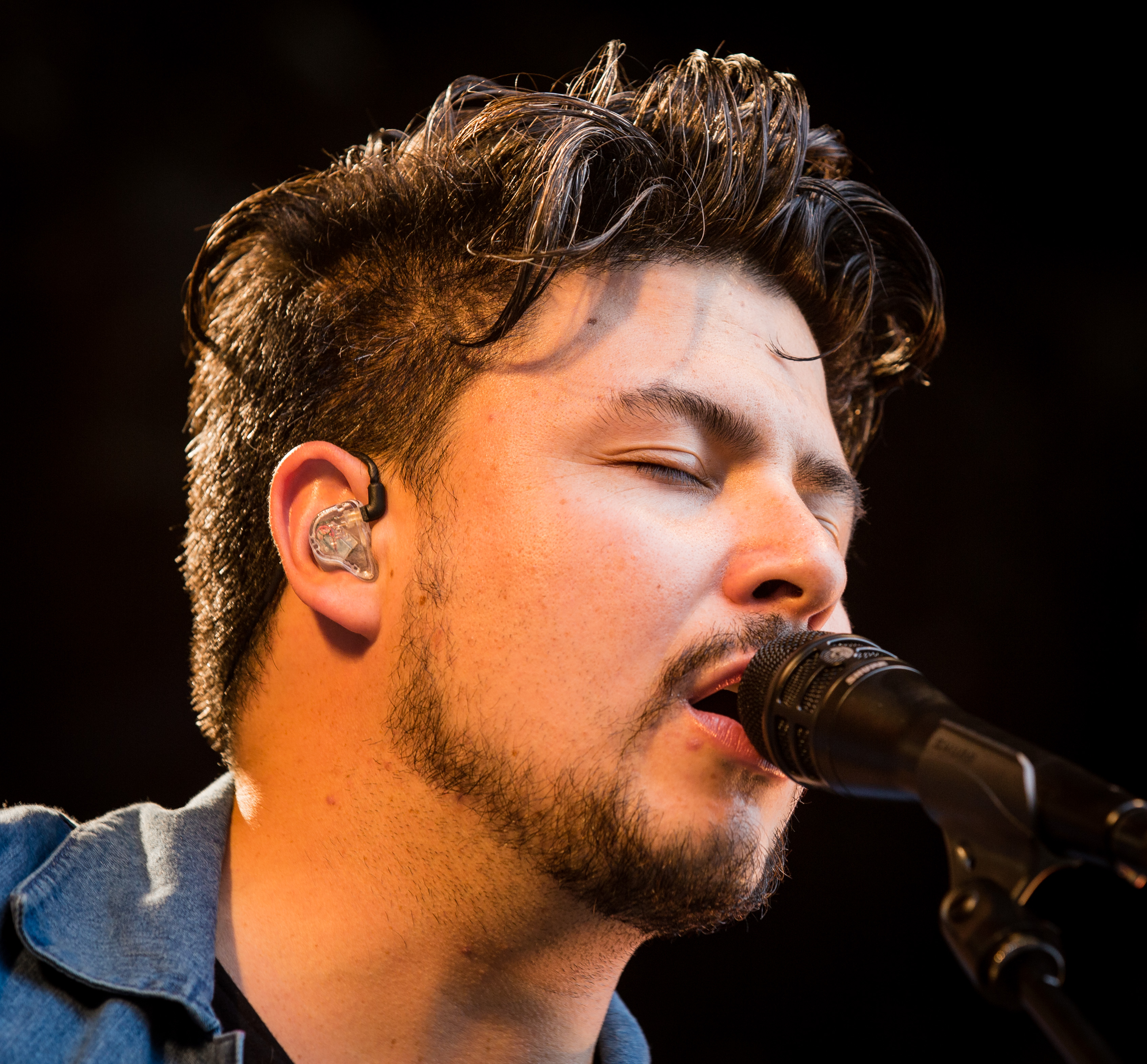
"Shoulda" by Jamie Woon had the longest most-broadcast song on radio in the 2010s with 20 non-consecutive weeks in 2012.

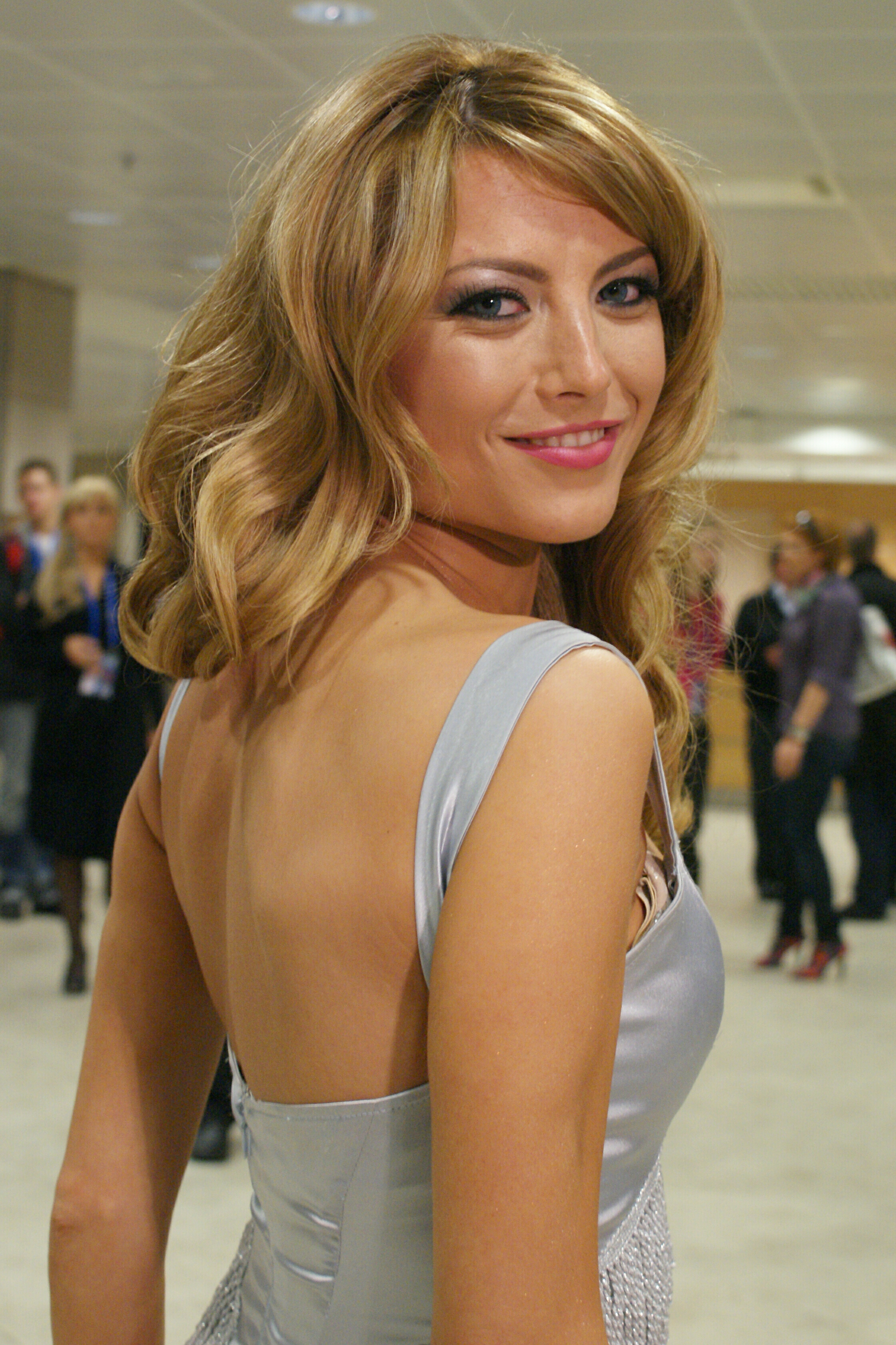
"Ecou" by Elena Gheorghe (pictured) and rapper Glance was 2013's most-broadcast Romanian song on radio stations.

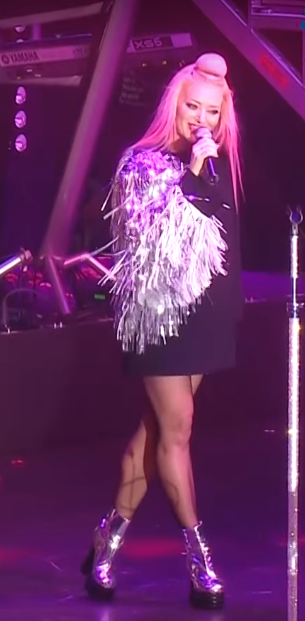
Delia Matache (pictured) and Kaira's "Pe aripi de vânt" was the top radio airplay song for 13 consecutive weeks in late 2014 and early 2015.

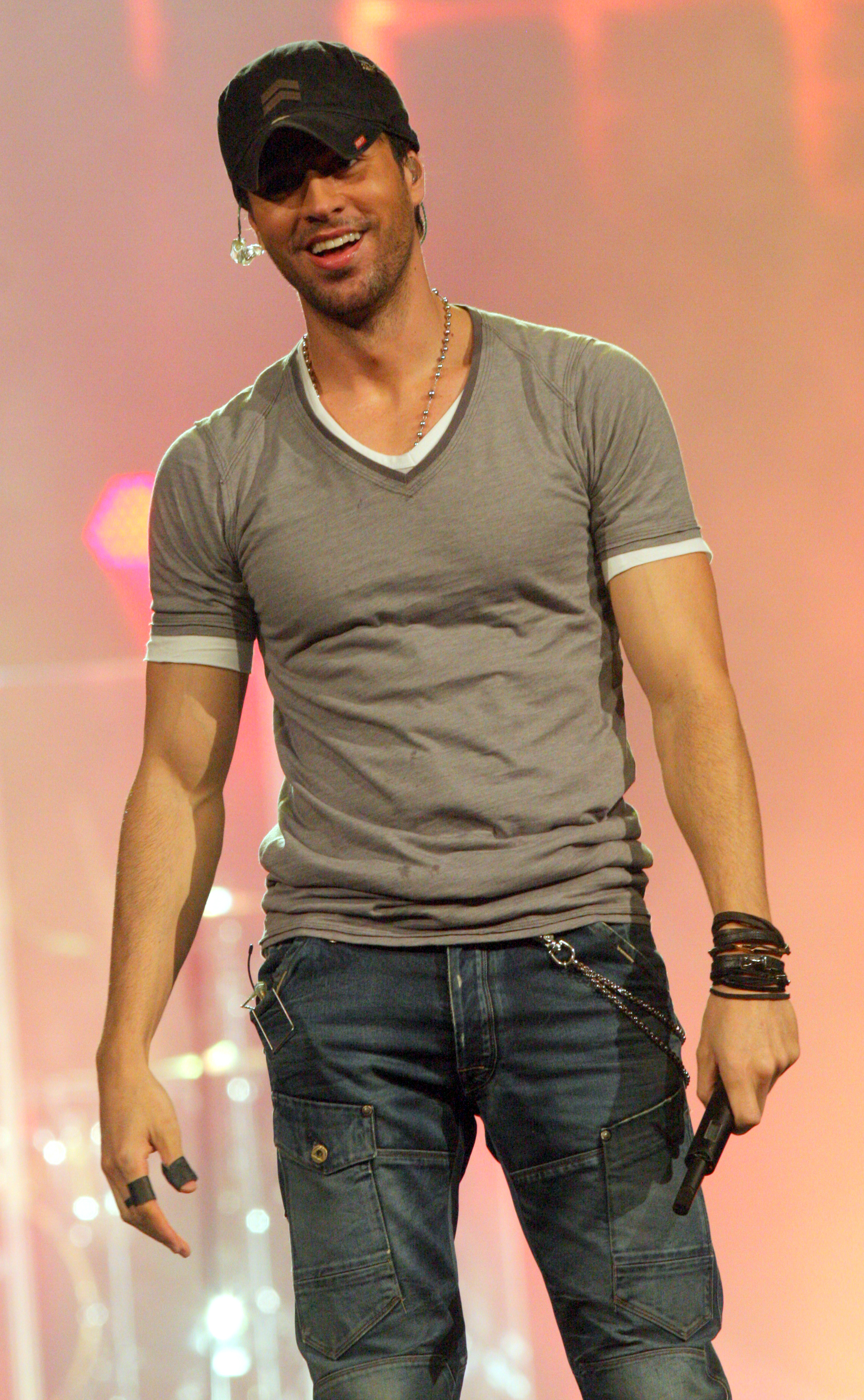
Enrique Iglesias (pictured) and Wisin's "Duele el Corazón" was the most-broadcast track on radio stations for eight consecutive weeks in 2016.

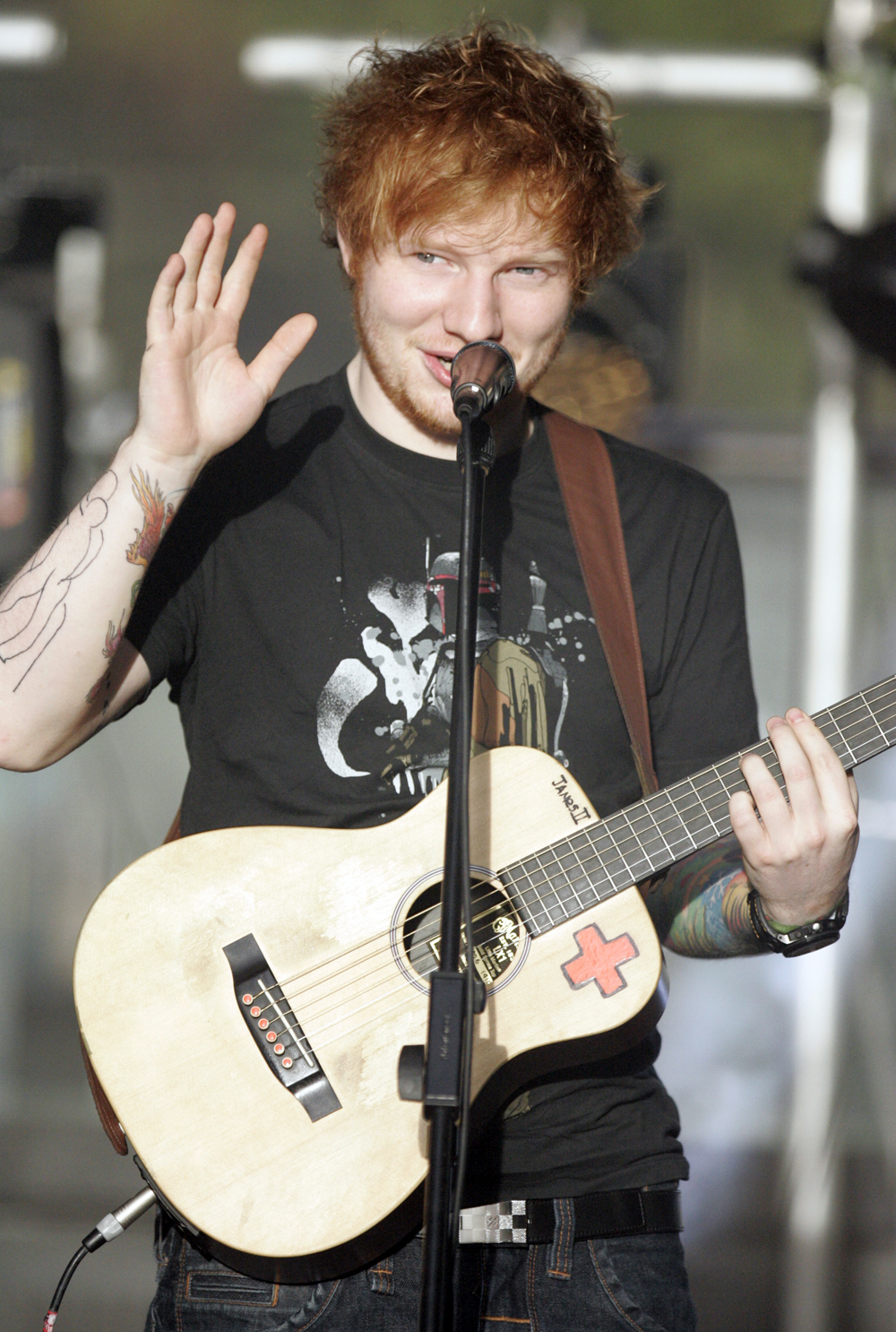
In 2017, "Shape of You" released by Ed Sheeran was the top radio song for nine weeks.

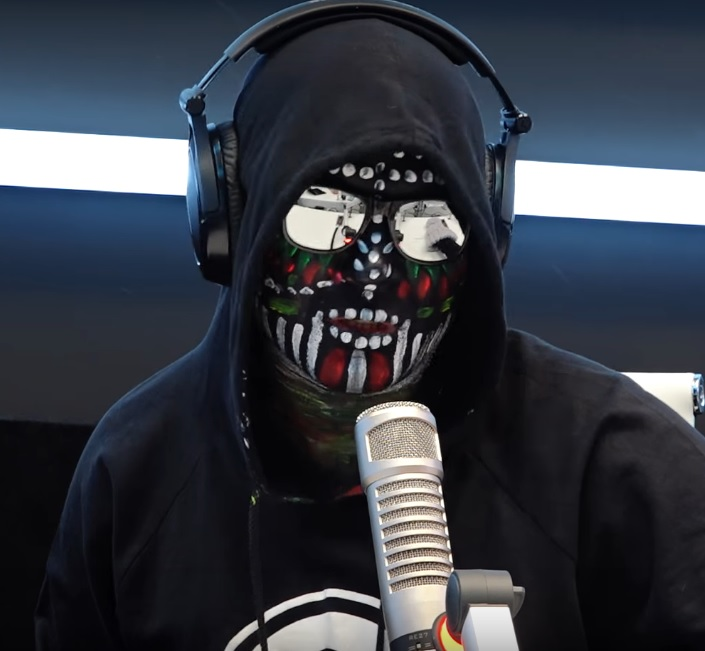
Carla's Dreams' (member pictured) "Luna" was number one on Media Forest's 2019 year-end chart.

List of most-broadcast songs on Romanian radio stations in the 2010s
Artist(s)	Title	Issue date	Wks.
The Black Eyed Peas	"I Gotta Feeling"◁	4 January 2010	1
Lady Gaga	"Bad Romance"◁	11 January 2010	4
Tom Boxer featuring Antonia	"Morena"❍	8 February 2010	4
Liviu Hodor featuring Tara	"Happy for You"❍	8 March 2010	2
Rihanna	"Russian Roulette"◁	22 March 2010	1
Tom Boxer featuring Antonia	"Morena"❍	29 March 2010	1
Rihanna	"Russian Roulette"◁	5 April 2010	3
Deepcentral	"In Love"❍	26 April 2010	2
Deepcentral	"In Love"❍	10 May 2010 (Note: Two songs tied for the number one position.)	1
Rihanna	"Russian Roulette"◁	10 May 2010	1
Narcotic Sound featuring Christian D	"Mamacita"❍	17 May 2010	1
Deepcentral	"In Love"❍	24 May 2010	1
DJ Sava featuring Raluka	"I Like (The Trumpet)"❍	31 May 2010	3
Shakira	"Gypsy"◁	21 June 2010	1
DJ Sava featuring Raluka	"I Like (The Trumpet)"❍	28 June 2010	1
Shakira	"Gypsy"◁	5 July 2010	1
Lady Gaga	"Alejandro"◁	12 July 2010	1
DJ Sava featuring Raluka	"I Like (The Trumpet)"❍	19 July 2010	1
Lady Gaga	"Alejandro"◁	26 July 2010	1
Yolanda Be Cool and DCUP	"We No Speak Americano"◁	2 August 2010	1
Lady Gaga	"Alejandro"◁	9 August 2010	2
DJ Sava featuring Raluka	"I Like (The Trumpet)"❍	23 August 2010	1
Stromae	"Alors on danse"◁	30 August 2010	2
Alexunder featuring Lys	"Drums"❍	13 September 2010	1
Elena Gheorghe	"Disco Romancing"❍	20 September 2010	4
Eminem featuring Rihanna	"Love the Way You Lie"◁	18 October 2010	3
Smiley featuring Pacha Man	"Love Is for Free"❍	8 November 2010	5
Alexandra Stan	"Mr. Saxobeat"❍	13 December 2010	3
Smiley featuring Pacha Man	"Love Is for Free"❍	3 January 2011	2
Alexandra Stan	"Mr. Saxobeat"❍	17 January 2011	2
Rihanna	"Only Girl (In the World)"◁	31 January 2011	2
Caro Emerald	"A Night like This"◁	14 February 2011	4
Kobi Peretz	"Some Love"◁	14 March 2011	1
Caro Emerald	"A Night like This"◁	21 March 2011	2
Kobi Peretz	"Some Love"◁	4 April 2011	5
Fly Project	"Goodbye"❍	9 May 2011	1
Nadia Ali	"Rapture (Avicii Remix)"◁	16 May 2011	1
Play & Win	"Ya BB"‡❍	23 May 2011	7
Don Omar featuring Lucenzo	"Danza Kuduro"◁	11 July 2011	3
Play & Win	"Ya BB"‡❍	1 August 2011	1
Pitbull featuring Ne-Yo, Afrojack and Nayer	"Give Me Everything"◁	8 August 2011	1
Play & Win	"Ya BB"‡❍	15 August 2011	1
Pitbull featuring Ne-Yo, Afrojack and Nayer	"Give Me Everything"◁	22 August 2011	1
Deepside Deejays	"Never Be Alone"❍	22 August 2011	1
Pitbull featuring Ne-Yo, Afrojack and Nayer	"Give Me Everything"◁	29 August 2011	2
Smiley	"Dream Girl"❍	12 September 2011	2
Pitbull featuring Ne-Yo, Afrojack and Nayer	"Give Me Everything"◁	26 September 2011	1
Smiley	"Dream Girl"❍	3 October 2011	6
Lykke Li	"I Follow Rivers (The Magician Remix)"◁	14 November 2011	12
Michel Teló	"Ai Se Eu Te Pego"◁	6 February 2012	1
Jamie Woon	"Shoulda"◁	13 February 2012	18
Connect-R	"Vara nu dorm"❍	18 June 2012	1
Jamie Woon	"Shoulda"◁	25 June 2012	2
Connect-R	"Vara nu dorm"❍	9 July 2012	6
Smiley	"Dead Man Walking"❍	20 August 2012	1
Alex Velea	"Minim doi"❍	27 August 2012	4
Alb Negru featuring Raflo & Rareș	"Mi-e sete de tine"❍	24 September 2012	5
Holograf	"Cât de departe"❍	29 October 2012	1
Alb Negru featuring Raflo & Rareș	"Mi-e sete de tine"❍	5 November 2012	4
What's Up featuring Andra	"K la meteo"❍	3 December 2012	1
Smiley featuring Alex Velea and Don Baxter	"Cai Verzi pe Pereți"❍	10 December 2012	2
Loredana Groza featuring Cabron	"Apa"❍	24 December 2012	3
Smiley featuring Alex Velea and Don Baxter	"Cai Verzi pe Pereți"❍	14 January 2013	2
Loredana Groza featuring Cabron	"Apa"❍	28 January 2013	1
Smiley featuring Alex Velea and Don Baxter	"Cai Verzi pe Pereți"❍	4 February 2013	2
Rihanna	"Diamonds"◁	18 February 2013	7
Cabron featuring What's Up and Iony	"Iarna pe val"❍	8 April 2013	1
Elena Gheorghe featuring Glance	"Ecou"‡❍	15 April 2013	7
Pink featuring Nate Ruess	"Just Give Me a Reason"◁	3 June 2013	1
Andra	"Inevitabil va fi bine"❍	10 June 2013	2
Pink featuring Nate Ruess	"Just Give Me a Reason"◁	24 June 2013	1
Andra	"Inevitabil va fi bine"❍	1 July 2013	2
Vama	"Perfect fără tine"❍	8 July 2013	8
Vama	"Perfect fără tine"❍	2 September 2013	1
Pink featuring Nate Ruess	"Just Give Me a Reason"◁	2 September 2013	1
Shift featuring Marius Moga	"Sus pe toc"❍	9 September 2013	2
Passenger	"Let Her Go"◁	30 September 2013	1
Nicole Cherry	"Memories"❍	7 October 2013	1
Passenger	"Let Her Go"◁	14 October 2013	6
Grasu XXL featuring Ami	"Déjà Vu"❍	25 November 2013	1
Smiley	"Acasă"❍	2 December 2013	15
Pharrell Williams	"Happy"◁	17 March 2014	1
Indila	"Dernière danse"◁	24 March 2014	4
Pharrell Williams	"Happy"◁	21 April 2014	3
Ed Sheeran	"I See Fire"◁	12 May 2014	11
Nico & Vinz	"Am I Wrong"◁	28 July 2014	1
Lidia Buble featuring Adrian Sînă	"Noi simţim la fel"❍	4 August 2014	2
Nico & Vinz	"Am I Wrong"◁	18 August 2014	1
Lidia Buble featuring Adrian Sînă	"Noi simţim la fel"❍	25 August 2014	1
Enrique Iglesias featuring Sean Paul, Descemer Bueno and Gente de Zona	"Bailando"◁	1 September 2014	8
Delia Matache featuring Kaira	"Pe aripi de vânt"❍	27 October 2014	13
Kwabs	"Walk"◁	26 January 2015	2
Delia Matache featuring Kaira	"Pe aripi de vânt"❍	9 February 2015	1
Inna featuring Marian Hill	"Diggy Down"❍	16 February 2015	1
Ed Sheeran	"Thinking Out Loud"◁	23 February 2015	1
Inna featuring Marian Hill	"Diggy Down"❍	2 March 2015	1
Inna featuring Marian Hill	"Diggy Down"❍	9 March 2015	1
Lariss	"Dale Papi"❍	9 March 2015	1
Ed Sheeran	"Thinking Out Loud"◁	16 March 2015	3
Ellie Goulding	"Love Me like You Do"◁	6 April 2015	1
Ellie Goulding	"Love Me like You Do"◁	13 April 2015	1
Disclosure	"Help Me Lose My Mind (Mazde Remix)"◁	13 April 2015	1
Disclosure	"Help Me Lose My Mind (Mazde Remix)"◁	20 April 2015	4
Smiley	"Oarecare"‡❍	11 May 2015	7
Nicky Jam and Enrique Iglesias	"El Perdón"◁	29 June 2015	10
Jo featuring Morandi	"Până vara viitore"❍	7 September 2015	2
Felix Jaehn featuring Jasmine Thompson	"Ain't Nobody (Loves Me Better)"◁	21 September 2015	4
Andra featuring Cabron	"Niciodată să nu spui niciodată"❍	19 October 2015	7
Lidia Buble featuring Amira	"Le-am spus și fetelor"❍	7 December 2015	4
Adele	"Hello"◁	4 January 2016	1
Adele	"Hello"◁	11 January 2016	2
Lidia Buble featuring Amira	"Le-am spus și fetelor"❍	11 January 2016	1
Feli	"Creioane colorate"❍	18 January 2016	1
Carla's Dreams	"Te rog"❍	25 January 2016	5
Mihail	"Mă ucide ea"❍	29 February 2016	7
Delia Matache featuring Deepcentral	"Gura ta"‡❍	18 April 2016	2
Delia Matache featuring Deepcentral	"Gura ta"‡❍	2 May 2016	1
Andra	"Iubirea schimbă tot"❍	2 May 2016	1
Carla's Dreams	"Sub pielea mea"❍	9 May 2016	1
Justin Bieber featuring Ed Sheeran	"Love Yourself"◁	16 May 2016	4
Vescan featuring Florin Ristei	"Las-o…"❍	13 June 2016	1
Justin Bieber featuring Ed Sheeran	"Love Yourself"◁	20 June 2016	3
Vescan featuring Florin Ristei	"Las-o…"❍	11 July 2016	1
Sak Noel and Salvi featuring Sean Paul's	"Trumpets"◁	11 July 2016	1
Carla's Dreams	"Acele"❍	18 July 2016	1
Andra featuring David Bisbal	"Without You"❍	25 July 2016	2
Carla's Dreams	"Acele"❍	8 August 2016	4
Enrique Iglesias featuring Wisin	"Duele el Corazón"◁	5 September 2016	8
Carla's Dreams	"Imperfect"❍	31 October 2016	6
Delia Matache	"Cine m-a făcut om mare"❍	12 December 2016	2
Carla's Dreams	"Imperfect"❍	26 December 2016	2
Sia featuring Kendrick Lamar	"The Greatest"◁	9 January 2017	5
Charlie Puth featuring Selena Gomez	"We Don't Talk Anymore"◁	13 February 2017	2
Rag'n'Bone Man	"Human"◁	27 February 2017	3
Ed Sheeran	"Shape of You"◁	20 March 2017	9
Smiley	"De Unde Vii la Ora Asta?"❍	22 May 2017	5
Carla's Dreams	"Până la sânge"❍	26 June 2017	9
DJ Khaled featuring Rihanna and Bryson Tiller	"Wild Thoughts"◁	28 August 2017	2
Axwell and Ingrosso	"More Than You Know"◁	11 September 2017	1
Arilena Ara	"Nëntori"◁	18 September 2017	2
Axwell and Ingrosso	"More Than You Know"◁	2 October 2017	1
Mihail	"Who You Are"❍	9 October 2017	2
Dua Lipa	"New Rules"◁	23 October 2017	3
Julia Michaels	"Issues"◁	13 November 2017	1
Pink	"What About Us"◁	20 November 2017	2
Zayn featuring Sia	"Dusk Till Dawn"◁	4 December 2017	1
Pink	"What About Us"◁	11 December 2017	2
Zayn featuring Sia	"Dusk Till Dawn"◁	25 December 2017	4
Pink	"What About Us"◁	22 January 2018	1
Post Malone featuring 21 Savage	"Rockstar"◁	12 February 2018	2
Smiley	"Vals"‡❍	26 February 2018	10
Matthew Koma	"Kisses Back"◁	7 May 2018	3
Marshmello and Anne-Marie	"Friends"◁	28 May 2018	1
The Motans	"Jackpot"❍	4 June 2018	1
Ina Wroldsen	"Strongest"◁	11 June 2018	3
Mahmut Orhan and Colonel Bagshot	"6 Days"◁	2 July 2018	3
Maluma	"El Préstamo"◁	23 July 2018	1
David Guetta and Sia	"Flames"◁	6 August 2018	2
Maroon 5 featuring Cardi B	"Girls Like You"◁	13 August 2018	2
Ina Wroldsen	"Strongest"◁	27 August 2018	1
Carla's Dreams	"Lacrimi și pumni în pereți"❍	3 September 2018	5
Calvin Harris and Sam Smith	"Promises"◁	8 October 2018	4
Dynoro and Gigi D'Agostino	"In My Mind"◁	5 November 2018	6
Alan Walker featuring Sophia Somajo	"Diamond Heart"◁	17 December 2018	1
David Guetta, Bebe Rexha and J Balvin	"Say My Name"◁	24 December 2018	2
Alan Walker featuring Sophia Somajo	"Diamond Heart"◁	7 January 2019	1
DJ Snake featuring Selena Gomez, Ozuna and Cardi B	"Taki Taki"◁	14 January 2019	2
MØ featuring Empress Of	"Red Wine"◁	28 January 2019	2
Carla's Dreams	"Luna"‡❍	11 February 2019	9
Pedro Capó and Farruko	"Calma"◁	15 April 2019	5
The Motans featuring Irina Rimes	"Poem"❍	20 May 2019	9
Shawn Mendes and Camila Cabello	"Señorita"◁	22 July 2019	7
Florian Rus and Mira	"Străzile din București"❍	9 September 2019	6
Killa Fonic featuring Carla's Dreams	"Bambolina"❍	21 October 2019	1
Florian Rus and Mira	"Străzile din București"❍	28 October 2019	2
Tones and I	"Dance Monkey"◁	11 November 2019	2
Alec Benjamin	"Let Me Down Slowly"◁	25 November 2019	1
Tones and I	"Dance Monkey"◁	2 December 2019	2
Faydee featuring Antonia	"Trika Trika"❍	16 December 2019	2
Tones and I	"Dance Monkey"◁	30 December 2019	1

=== Television ===
Summaries (television)
By song
Artist(s)	Title	Wks.
Carla's Dreams	"Luna"	15
Guess Who featuring DeMoga	"Tot mai sus"	14
DJ Snake featuring Selena Gomez, Ozuna and Cardi B	"Taki Taki"	13
Grasu XXL featuring Ami	"Déjà Vu"	12
Ed Sheeran	"Shape of You"	12
Shawn Mendes and Camila Cabello	"Señorita	11
Carla's Dreams	"Acele"	10
Randi featuring Uddi and Nadir	"Prietena ta"	10
Mahmut Orhan and Colonel Bagshot	"6 Days"	9
Tones and I	"Dance Monkey"	9
G-Eazy and Halsey	"Him & I"	9
Lykke Li	"I Follow Rivers (The Magician Remix)"	9
By artist
Artist		No.
Carla's Dreams		8
Smiley		8
Andra		5
Delia Matache		5
Inna		4
Rihanna		4
Calvin Harris		3
Deepcentral		3
Puya		3
What's Up		3

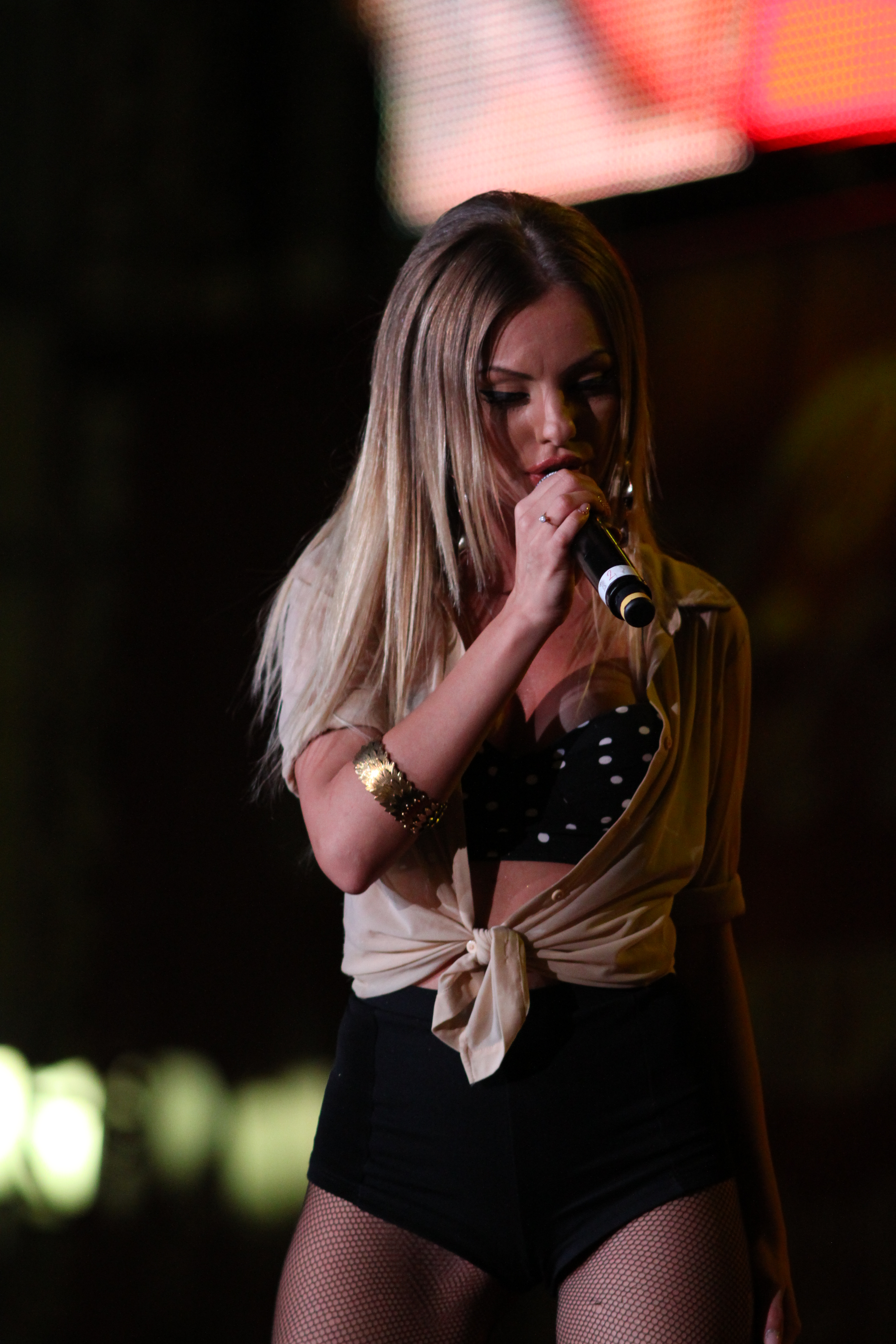
Alexandra Stan's "Mr. Saxobeat" was the most-broadcast song on television channels for six consecutive weeks in 2010.

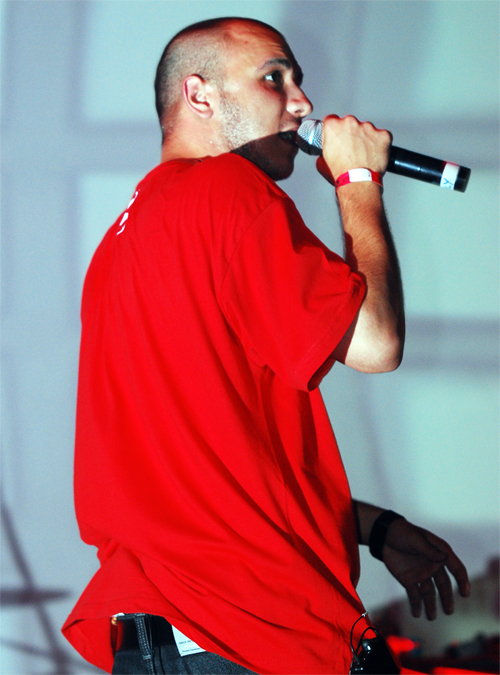
Guess Who (pictured) and DeMoga's "Tot mai sus" was the top television airplay song for 14 weeks in 2011, the longest run in the 2010s.

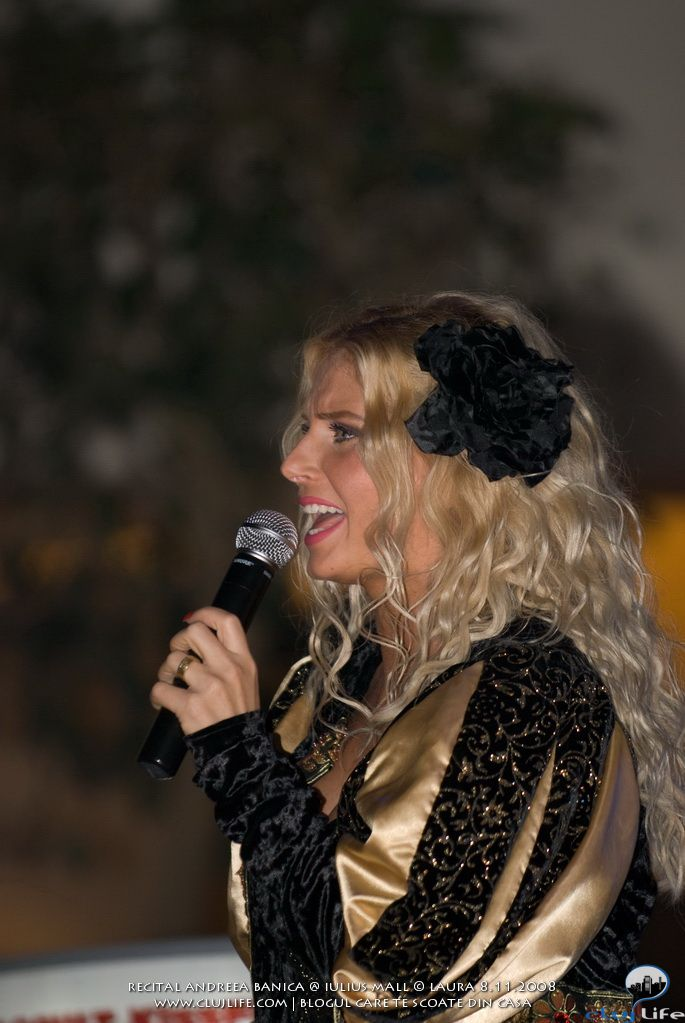
"Shining Heart" by Laurențiu Duță and Andreea Bănică (pictured) was the most-broadcast track on television for a total of eight weeks in 2012.

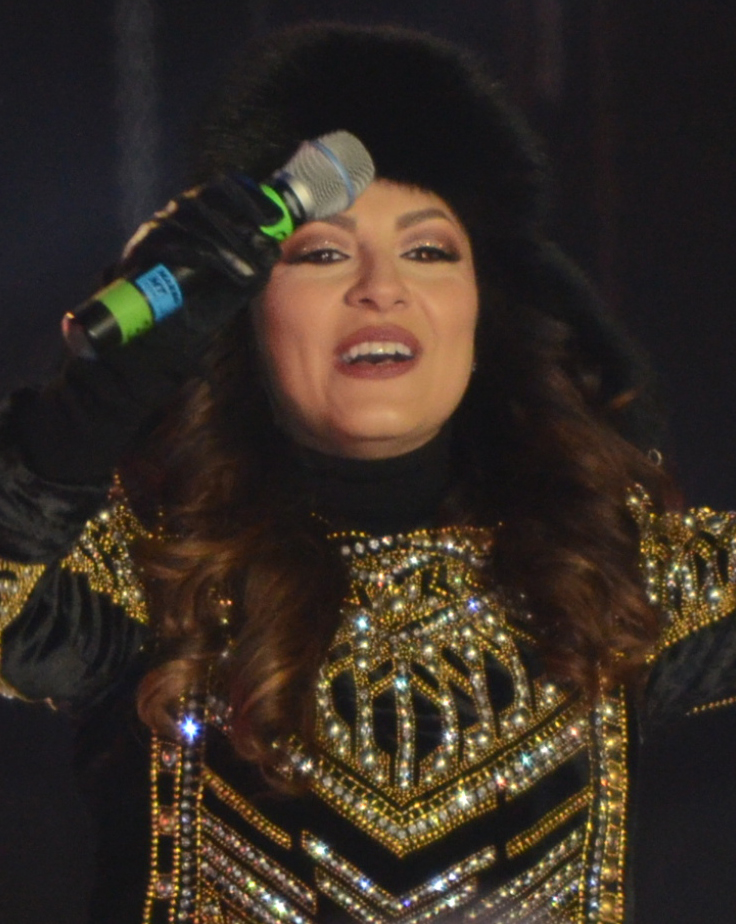
In 2013, Andra had two singles which were the most-broadcast on television: "Inevitabil va fi bine" and "K la meteo".

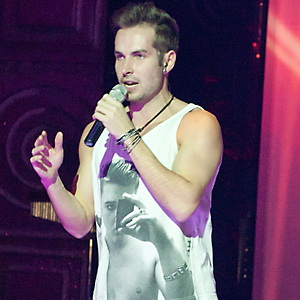
"Prietena ta" by Randi (pictured), Uddi and Nadir was the top television song for nine consecutive weeks in 2014.

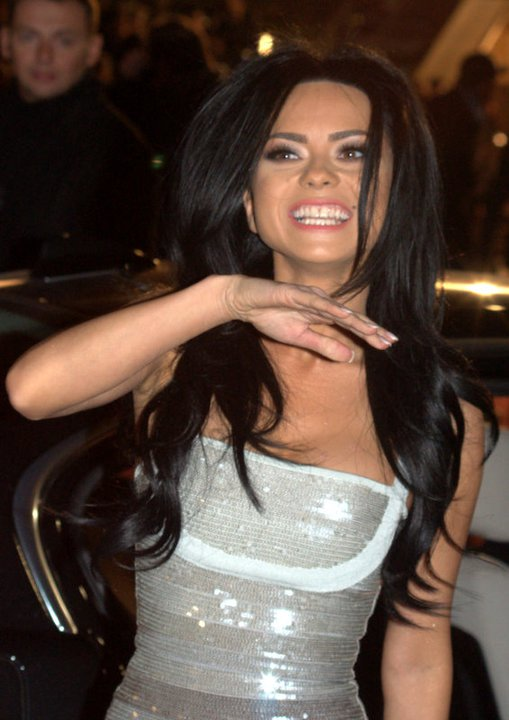
"Diggy Down" by Inna (pictured) and Marian Hill spent the most weeks as the most-broadcast song on television in 2015 with eight.

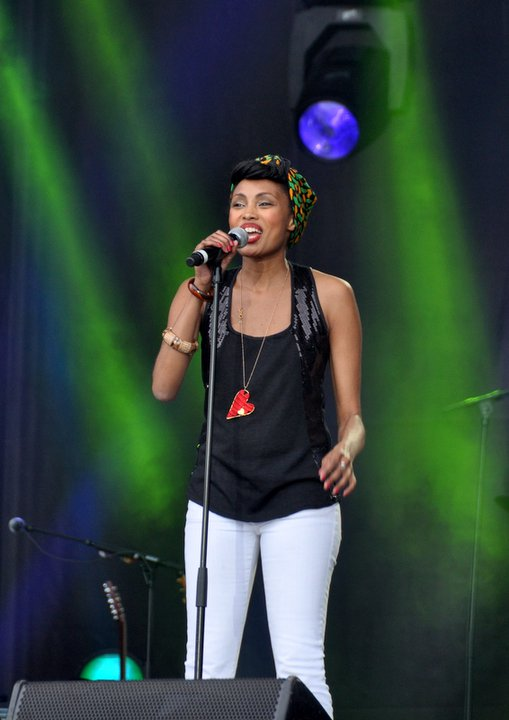
Imany's "Don't Be So Shy" was the most-broadcast single on television for five weeks in 2016.

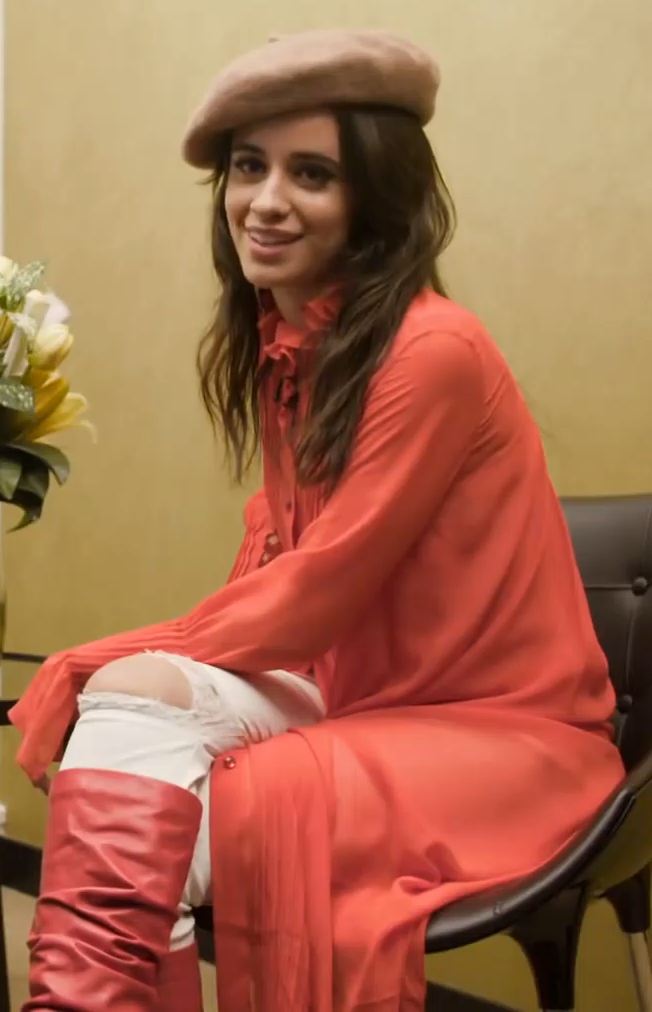
In 2018, Camila Cabello's "Havana" was the top song on television for seven weeks.

List of most-broadcast songs on Romanian television channels in the 2010s
Artist(s)	Title	Issue date	Wks.
Dan Balan	"Chica Bomb"❍	4 January 2010	2
Lady Gaga	"Bad Romance"◁	18 January 2010	1
Dan Balan	"Chica Bomb"❍	25 January 2010	2
Lady Gaga	"Bad Romance"◁	8 February 2010	1
Guess Who	"Locul potrivit"❍	15 February 2010	1
Timbaland featuring Nelly Furtado and SoShy	"Morning After Dark"◁	22 February 2010	3
Guess Who	"Locul potrivit"❍	15 March 2010	3
Deepcentral	"In Love"❍	5 April 2010	1
Smiley featuring Cheloo	"Plec Pe Marte"❍	12 April 2010	5
Deepcentral	"In Love"❍	17 May 2010	1
Rihanna	"Rude Boy"◁	24 May 2010	4
Yolanda Be Cool featuring DCUP	"We No Speak Americano"◁	21 June 2010	2
Lady Gaga	"Alejandro"◁	5 July 2010	3
Stromae	"Alors on danse"◁	26 July 2010	3
DJ Sava featuring Raluka	"I Like (The Trumpet)"❍	16 August 2010	2
Stromae	"Alors on danse"◁	30 August 2010	2
Elena Gheorghe	"Disco Romancing"❍	13 September 2010	4
Xonia featuring Deepcentral	"My Beautiful One"❍	11 October 2010	2
Eminem featuring Rihanna	"Love the Way You Lie"◁	25 October 2010	1
Smiley featuring Pacha Man	"Love Is for Free"❍	1 November 2010	4
Alexandra Stan	"Mr. Saxobeat"❍	29 November 2010	6
Andra	"Something New"❍	10 January 2011	1
Alexandra Stan	"Mr. Saxobeat"❍	17 January 2011	2
Andra	"Something New"❍	31 January 2011	1
Rihanna	"Only Girl (In the World)"◁	7 February 2011	1
Shakira	"Loca"◁	14 February 2011	3
Roa	"Ne place"❍	7 March 2011	3
Puya featuring Connect-R	"Americandrim"❍	28 March 2011	2
Jennifer Lopez featuring Pitbull	"On the Floor"◁	11 April 2011	5
Fly Project	"Goodbye"❍	16 May 2011	7
DJ Project	"Mi-e dor de noi"❍	4 July 2011	2
Guess Who featuring DeMoga	"Tot mai sus"❍	18 July 2011	11
DJ Antoine vs Timati featuring Kalenna	"Welcome to St. Tropez"◁	3 October 2011	1
Guess Who featuring DeMoga	"Tot mai sus"❍	10 October 2011	2
Pitbull featuring Marc Anthony	"Rain Over Me"◁	24 October 2011	2
Sean Paul featuring Alexis Jordan	"Got 2 Luv U"◁	7 November 2011	1
Guess Who featuring DeMoga	"Tot mai sus"❍	7 November 2011	1
Sean Paul featuring Alexis Jordan	"Got 2 Luv U"◁	14 November 2011	1
Lykke Li	"I Follow Rivers (The Magician Remix)"◁	21 November 2011	9
Rihanna featuring Calvin Harris	"We Found Love"◁	23 January 2012	2
Michel Teló	"Ai Se Eu Te Pego"◁	6 February 2012	5
Vunk featuring Antonia	"Pleacă"❍	12 March 2012	6
Laurențiu Duță featuring Andreea Bănică	"Shining Heart"❍	23 April 2012	8
Smiley	"Dead Man Walking"❍	18 June 2012	2
Connect-R	"Vara nu dorm"❍	2 July 2012	1
Smiley	"Dead Man Walking"❍	9 July 2012	1
Connect-R	"Vara nu dorm"❍	16 July 2012	3
Smiley	"Dead Man Walking"❍	13 August 2012	1
Connect-R	"Vara nu dorm"❍	20 August 2012	1
Smiley	"Dead Man Walking"❍	27 August 2012	2
Alex Velea	"Minim doi"❍	10 September 2012	7
Ami	"Trumpet Lights"❍	22 October 2012	3
What's Up featuring Andra	"K la meteo"❍	12 November 2012	5
Smiley and Alex Velea featuring Don Baxter	"Cai Verzi pe Pereți"❍	17 December 2012	3
What's Up featuring Andra	"K la meteo"❍	7 January 2013	1
Loredana Groza featuring Cabron	"Apa"❍	14 January 2013	6
Asaf Avidan	"One Day / Reckoning Song"◁	25 February 2013	1
Rihanna	"Diamonds"◁	4 March 2013	2
Rihanna	"Diamonds"◁	18 March 2013	1
Connect-R	"Love Is the Way"❍	18 March 2013	1
Cabron featuring What's Up and Iony	"Iarna pe val"❍	25 March 2013	1
Rihanna	"Diamonds"◁	1 April 2013	1
Cabron featuring What's Up and Iony	"Iarna pe val"❍	8 April 2013	1
Antonia	"Marabou"❍	15 April 2013	4
Elena Gheorghe featuring Glance	"Ecou"❍	13 May 2013	5
Andra	"Inevitabil va fi bine"❍	17 June 2013	5
Vama	"Perfect fără tine"❍	22 July 2013	7
Naughty Boy featuring Sam Smith	"La La La"◁	9 September 2013	1
Nicole Cherry	"Memories"❍	16 September 2013	1
Avicii	"Wake Me Up"◁	23 September 2013	2
Shift featuring Marius Moga	"Sus pe toc"❍	7 October 2013	1
Avicii	"Wake Me Up"◁	14 October 2013	1
DJ Sava featuring Raluka	"Aroma"❍	21 October 2013	2
Passenger	"Let Her Go"◁	4 November 2013	3
Smiley	"Acasă"❍	25 November 2013	1
Grasu XXL featuring Ami	"Déjà Vu"❍	9 December 2013	12
Milk & Sugar featuring Maria Marquez	"Canto Del Pilon"◁	3 March 2014	1
Smiley	"Acasă"❍	10 March 2014	1
Pharrell Williams	"Happy"◁	17 March 2014	5
What's Up	"Taxi"❍	14 April 2014	1
Indila	"Dernière danse"◁	21 April 2014	1
Pharrell Williams	"Happy"◁	28 April 2014	1
Indila	"Dernière danse"◁	5 May 2014	1
What's Up	"Taxi"❍	12 May 2014	1
Pharrell Williams	"Happy"◁	19 May 2014	2
3rei Sud Est	"Emoții"❍	2 June 2014	3
Katy Perry	"Dark Horse"◁	23 June 2014	1
Katy Perry	"Dark Horse"◁	30 June 2014	1
Delia Matache featuring Uddi	"Ipotecat"❍	30 June 2014	1
Delia Matache featuring Uddi	"Ipotecat"❍	7 July 2014	1
Alex Velea	"Din vina ta"❍	14 July 2014	1
Marius Moga	"Pe barba mea"❍	21 July 2014	3
Alex Velea	"Din vina ta"❍	11 August 2014	2
Puya featuring Inna	"Strigă"❍	25 August 2014	1
Jason Derulo featuring Snoop Dogg	"Wiggle"◁	1 September 2014	6
Dorian	"Mare albastră"❍	13 October 2014	1
Trey Songz	"Na Na"◁	20 October 2014	1
Delia Matache featuring Kaira	"Pe aripi de vânt"❍	27 October 2014	6
Randi featuring Uddi and Nadir	"Prietena ta"❍	8 December 2014	8
Randi featuring Uddi and Nadir	"Prietena ta"❍	26 January 2015	1
Iggy Azalea featuring Rita Ora	"Black Widow"◁	26 January 2015	1
Randi featuring Uddi and Nadir	"Prietena ta"❍	2 February 2015	1
Iggy Azalea featuring Rita Ora	"Black Widow"◁	9 February 2015	2
Inna featuring Marian Hill	"Diggy Down"❍	23 February 2015	5
Shift featuring Andra	"Avioane de hârtie"❍	30 March 2015	1
Inna featuring Marian Hill	"Diggy Down"❍	6 April 2015	3
Shift featuring Andra	"Avioane de hârtie"❍	27 April 2015	1
Lost Frequencies	"Are You with Me"◁	4 May 2015	3
Flo Rida featuring Sage the Gemini and Lookas	"G.D.F.R."◁	25 May 2015	2
Lost Frequencies	"Are You with Me"◁	8 June 2015	2
Smiley	"Oarecare"❍	26 June 2015	1
Carla's Dreams featuring Delia Matache	"Cum ne noi"❍	29 June 2015	6
Jo featuring Randi	"Până vara viitoare"❍	10 August 2015	1
Carla's Dreams featuring Delia Matache	"Cum ne noi"❍	29 June 2015	2
Jo featuring Randi	"Până vara viitoare"❍	31 August 2015	3
Felix Jaehn featuring Jasmine Thompson	"Ain't Nobody (Loves Me Better)"◁	21 September 2015	5
Andra featuring Cabron	"Niciodată să nu spui niciodată"❍	26 October 2015	1
Jack Perry	"Dime"◁	2 November 2015	2
Andra featuring Cabron	"Niciodată să nu spui niciodată"❍	16 November 2015	1
Jack Perry	"Dime"◁	23 November 2015	1
Lidia Buble featuring Amira	"Le-am spus și fetelor"❍	30 November 2015	1
Calvin Harris and Disciples	"How Deep Is Your Love"◁	30 November 2015	1
Calvin Harris and Disciples	"How Deep Is Your Love"◁	7 December 2015	3
Ruby featuring Dorian Popa	"Bună, ce mai zici?"❍	28 December 2015	3
Carla's Dreams	"Te rog"❍	18 January 2016	7
Imany	"Don't Be So Shy"◁	7 March 2016	2
Delia Matache featuring Deepcentral	"Gura ta"❍	21 March 2016	3
Imany	"Don't Be So Shy"◁	11 April 2016	3
Carla's Dreams	"Sub pielea mea"❍	2 May 2016	6
Vescan featuring Florin Ristei	"Las-o…"❍	13 June 2016	3
Alan Walker	"Faded"◁	4 July 2016	2
Carla's Dreams	"Acele"❍	18 July 2016	10
LP	"Lost on You"◁	26 September 2016	1
Irina Rimes	"Visele"❍	3 October 2016	2
LP	"Lost on You"◁	17 October 2016	1
Jo	"Cu un picior în rai"❍	24 October 2016	2
Carla's Dreams	"Imperfect"❍	7 November 2016	5
Randi	"Ochii ăia verzi"❍	12 December 2016	1
Burak Yeter featuring Danelle Sandoval	"Tuesday"◁	12 December 2016	1
Morandi	"Ochii ăia verzi"❍	26 December 2016	1
Burak Yeter featuring Danelle Sadoval	"Tuesday"◁	2 January 2017	5
Charlie Puth featuring Selena Gomez	"We Don't Talk Anymore"◁	6 February 2017	1
Rag'n'Bone Man	"Human"◁	13 February 2017	2
Ed Sheeran	"Shape of You"◁	27 February 2017	12
Smiley	"De Unde Vii la Ora Asta?"❍	22 May 2017	1
The Motans featuring Delia Matache	"Weekend"❍	29 May 2017	3
Smiley	"De Unde Vii la Ora Asta?"❍	19 June 2017	3
Carla's Dreams	"Până la sânge"❍	10 July 2017	2
What's Up	"La tine"❍	24 July 2017	2
DJ Khaled featuring Rihanna and Bryson Tiller	"Wild Thoughts"◁	7 August 2017	3
Inna featuring Erik	"Ruleta"❍	28 August 2017	1
DJ Khaled featuring Rihanna and Bryson Tiller	"Wild Thoughts"◁	4 September 2017	1
Arilena Ara	"Nëntori"◁	11 September 2017	1
Edward Sanda featuring Ioana Ignat	"Doar pe a ta"❍	18 September 2017	1
Maluma	"Felices los 4"◁	25 September 2017	4
Dua Lipa	"New Rules"◁	23 October 2017	1
Maluma	"Felices los 4"◁	30 October 2017	3
Dua Lipa	"New Rules"◁	20 November 2017	7
Camila Cabello featuring Young Thug	"Havana"◁	8 January 2018	7
Smiley	"Vals"❍	26 February 2018	4
G-Eazy and Halsey	"Him & I"◁	26 March 2018	4
Becky G featuring Bad Bunny	"Mayores"◁	23 April 2018	1
G-Eazy and Halsey	"Him & I"◁	30 April 2018	3
Matthew Koma	"Kisses Back"◁	21 May 2018	2
G-Eazy and Halsey	"Him & I"◁	4 June 2018	2
Mahmut Orhan and Colonel Bagshot	"6 Days"◁	18 June 2018	5
Calvin Harris and Dua Lipa	"One Kiss"◁	23 July 2018	2
Sofía Reyes featuring Jason Derulo and De La Ghetto	"1, 2, 3"◁	6 August 2018	1
Mahmut Orhan and Colonel Bagshot	"6 Days"◁	13 August 2018	4
Carla's Dreams	"Lacrimi și pumni în pereți"❍	10 September 2018	3
Maroon 5 featuring Cardi B	"Girls Like You"◁	1 October 2018	3
Karmen featuring Krishane	"Lock My Hips"❍	22 October 2018	2
Mark Stam	"Impar"❍	5 November 2018	2
Mark Stam	"Impar"❍	19 November 2018	1
Aya Nakamura	"Djadja"◁	19 November 2018	1
Aya Nakamura	"Djadja"◁	26 November 2018	5
DJ Snake featuring Selena Gomez, Ozuna and Cardi B	"Taki Taki"◁	24 December 2018	13
Carla's Dreams	"Luna"❍	25 March 2019	12
Pedro Capó and Farruko	"Calma"◁	17 June 2019	1
Carla's Dreams	"Luna"❍	24 June 2019	1
Pedro Capó and Farruko	"Calma"◁	1 July 2019	1
Carla's Dreams	"Luna"❍	8 July 2019	2
Minelli	"Mariola"❍	22 July 2019	1
The Motans featuring Irina Rimes	"Poem"❍	29 July 2019	4
Shawn Mendes and Camila Cabello	"Señorita"◁	26 August 2019	11
Florian Rus and Mira	"Străzile din București"❍	11 November 2019	4
Tones and I	"Dance Monkey"◁	9 December 2019	4
