= Pe coastă =

"Pe Coastă"

Single by B.U.G. Mafia featuring Sergiu Ferat
- Released: May 16, 2016
- Recorded: 2016; Ines Sound & Video (Bucharest, Romania)
- Genre: Hip hop
- Length: 4:03
- Label: Casa Productions
- Songwriter(s): Alin Demeter; Dragoș Vlad-Neagu; Vlad Irimia
- Producer(s): Tataee

B.U.G. Mafia singles chronology
"Să cânte trompetele" (2014)	"Pe Coastă" (2016)	"Ulei și apă" (2016)

Music video
- "Pe Coastă" on YouTube

"Pe Coastă" (Coastin') is a single by Romanian hip hop group B.U.G. Mafia, featuring vocals by Sergiu Ferat. The song is produced by group founder Tataee, mixed by longtime collaborator Cristi Dobrică, and was released as a digital single on YouTube on May 16, 2016.

== Background ==
The group announced the single's upcoming release on May 16, 2016, during Mihai Morar's morning radio show on Radio Zu, where B.U.G. Mafia had been invited to perform live. The group's previous single, Să Cânte Trompetele, a collaboration with Vocea României contestant Feli Donose, had been very successful, generating a lot of interest from fans and critics alike regarding their following release. The following day, Morar premiered the song on his radio show by playing repeatedly back to back for 20 uninterrupted minutes. It was written by group members Tataee, Caddillac, and Uzzi and it features vocals from Sergiu Ferat, a Romanian jazz vocalist, also a contestant on Vocea României in its fifth season. The song interpolates 'Un 2 şi Trei de 0', the lead single from the group's sixth studio album, Întotdeauna pentru totdeauna.

== Composition ==
"Pe Coastă" was composed and produced by group member Tataee, his 26th release with the group, following a two-year break after their previous single, with musician Valentin Câmpeanu providing additional keyboards. Romanian sound engineer Cristi Dobrică mixed and mastered the song for its commercial release, while members Uzzi and Caddillac wrote their verses, respectively. Lyrically, the song is a summer-themed anthem celebrating life in the moment while also mentioning the group's successful 23-year history and its relationship with their fans.

== Music video ==
The group announced their decision to create a music video for the single on May 4, 2016. In a Facebook video post, Tataee asked the fans to send footage from the group's concerts in Costinești as well as videos of themselves on the beach and driving to the seaside, so that it could be included in the music video. Just before the single's release, on May 16, the group posted a video reviewing the first batch of footage received from the fans, and announced that the music video will premier sometime in the near future. One of the singled out videos captured one of their concerts in Costinești which carried long enough into the late night that they witnessed the sun rise while still on stage performing. The moment is also mentioned by Tataee in the third verse of the song. The video was released on July 6, 2016.

== Critical reception ==
While the YouTube feedback for the music video and song have been overwhelmingly positive, other reviews have been more dismissive. In a review for Vice News, writer Ionuț Axinescu gave the song a negative review, criticizing its radio-friendly production and self-indulgent songwriting, while at the same time praising group member Uzzi's delivery; "The song is weak, even though Uzzi would be decent even if he'd rap about the Mechanism for Cooperation and Verification. Besides, there's another issue here: the song isn't targeting the group's usual fan base, but rather for the new generation of emigrants who are coming back to Romania driving expensive cars and spend their hard-earned money in Mamaia while they remember the difficult road they had to walk to get there". Similarly, in another 2016 piece for Vice News, Mădălin Istrate interviewed a number of Pantelimon residents who universally panned the song for its pop-oriented sound and music video.

== Track listing ==
Digital single

No.	Title	Writer(s)	Producer(s)	Length
1.	"Pe Coastă"	A.Demeter, D.Vlad-Neagu, V.Irimia	Tataee	4:03
