= Bani, Bani, Bani =

Single by B.U.G. Mafia featuring Michel Kotcha
- Released: April 24, 2017
- Recorded: 2016; Ines Sound & Video (Bucharest, Romania)
- Genre: Hip hop
- Length: 4:22
- Label: Casa Productions
- Songwriters: Vlad Irimia; Dragoș Vlad-Neagu; Alin Demeter
- Producer: Tataee

B.U.G. Mafia singles chronology
"Ulei și apă" (2016)	"Bani, Bani, Bani" (2017)

Music video
- "Bani, Bani, Bani" on YouTube

"Bani, Bani, Bani" (Money, Money, Money) is a single by Romanian hip hop group B.U.G. Mafia, featuring vocals from Michel Kotcha. The song, produced by group member Tataee and mixed by longtime collaborator Cristi Dobrică, was released as a stand-alone digital download single on April 24, 2017 by Casa Productions in Romania. The song examines the problematic relationships which spawn from financial difficulties, while also reflecting on the group's past and future prospects. The song's accompanying music video, directed by Alin Surdu, depicts a number of fictitious characters experiencing a stylized struggle for fiscal comfort, while also featuring the members of the group and singer Michel Kotcha performing their verses and chorus, respectively.

== Background ==
The group first mentioned the song following the release of their 2016 single, Pe Coastă (Coastin'), the first of a three-single series planned for release during the second half of 2016. The song's instrumental was played during a behind the scenes video shot by the group during their New Year rehearsal sessions and was later announced as a stand-alone single to be released with a music video in 2017. Preceding the single's release, a randomly chosen fan who had won a contest was invited to attend a private listening session with the band's members at the Ines Sound & Video studios in Bucharest, where the track was recorded and produced.

== Composition ==
"Bani, Bani, Bani"
A 30-second sample of "Bani, Bani, Bani" by B.U.G. Mafia featuring Michel Kotcha.

The song is produced by group founder and producer Tataee and features contributions from guitarist Nicu Patoi. Longtime B.U.G. Mafia collaborator Cristi Dobrică mixed and mastered the song, while former Vocea României contestant Michel Kotcha is featured on the chorus. As in many other B.U.G. Mafia releases, bandmates Caddillac and Uzzi receive co-writing credit, having worked on their verses, respectively. Musically, the song is an uptempo, R&B-influenced tune, featuring a powerful bassline, 808 drums and a rhythm guitar running throughout it. Lyrically, the song explores the group's somewhat tumultuous and ambivalent relationship with wealth and the influence and impact their long-running public social status has had on them, while reflecting on their modest beginnings in the Romanian music industry in the early 1990s and celebrating their lack of compromise in their financial and artistic ventures.

== Music video ==
The group announced the music video on Facebook on April 6, 2017, following the wrapping of the shooting in Bucharest. Directed by Alin Surdu, it was released simultaneously with the music download on April 24, 2017. The video was shot in black and white entirely and features the group and singer Michel Kotcha performing their parts of the song, while also depicting various fictitious characters, portrayed by actors Andrei Runcanu, Mădălina Craiu, and various other extras, struggling to achieve and maintain their financial status. The story for the video was conceived by group member Uzzi, who then collaborated with Tataee, who also served as an executive producer for the video, and Caddillac, to write a more detailed outline.

== Track listing ==
Digital download
No.	Title	Length
1.	"Bani, Bani, Bani (feat. Michel Kotcha)"	4:22
