= Născut și crescut în Pantelimon =

Născut şi crescut în Pantelimon

Studio album by B.U.G. Mafia
- Released: 29 November 1996
- Recorded: 1996; Magic Sound System Studio (Bucharest, Romania); Q-Bic Sound System Studio (Bucharest, Romania)
- Genre: Gangsta rap
- Length: 48:39
- Label: Cat Music/Media Services/Sony Music; 101 0858 4
- Producer: Tataee

B.U.G. Mafia chronology
Înc-o zi, înc-o poveste (1996)	Născut şi crescut în Pantelimon (1996)	IV: Deasupra Tuturor (1997)

Singles from Născut şi crescut în Pantelimon
- 1. "Până Când Moartea Ne Va Despărţi (feat. Puya & July)" Released: September 10, 1996

Născut şi crescut în Pantelimon (Born and Raised in Pantelimon) is the second studio album by B.U.G. Mafia, released by Cat Music/Media Services in Romania on 29 November 1996. It was highly anticipated as Înc-o zi, înc-o poveste (Another Day, Another Story), their previous studio material, had produced hit records such as Pantelimonu' Petrece (Pantelimon's Having a Party), Înc-o zi, înc-o poveste (Another day, Another Story) and Viaţă De Borfaş (Hustler's Life). The album sold 60 000 copies

== Content ==
B.U.G. Mafia released the track Pana cand moartea ne va desparti ('Till Death Do Us Part), a collaboration with young and upcoming rapper Puya as an unofficial single. A soulful ode, the song still remains one of the best known in Romanian hip hop, being remade for the Viaţa noastră (Vol.1) (Our Life Vol.1) anniversary album with the vocals being recorded by Tataee. It depicted the story of two brothers, Alex and Tony, who grew up in the projects having to face everyday life in the ghetto and starting to live on the streets when their parents died. The twist at the end of the song is when the two brothers face each other in a shoot out, one being a top policeman and the other a head of organized crime. They both died in the shoot out, the story being one of the most emotional in the group's work.

The album featured a larger number of featured guests such as Puya, July, Freakadadisk, Tragaci, Don Baxter and Eddy Schneider (credited as C.R.Bel, not to be confused with another Romanian artist, member of breakdance group Simplu who used this stage name). It was one of the first Romanian hip hop albums to use real-live instrumentation and scratching. It sold over 30,000 copies and it was the group's last album with Emil "Coco" Coroianu, who died the following year, as a sound engineer. It also contained a re-imagining of 2Pac's "Something 2 Die 4" skit off his Strictly 4 My N.I.G.G.A.Z... album, dedicated to the recently deceased Shakur and Eric "Eazy E" Wright titled "Ceva Pentru Care Merita Sa Mori" (Something That's Worth Dying For).

== Track listing ==
1. "Ne-am Întors"
2. "Am Să-ți Zbor Căpățâna"
3. "Pe Viață"
4. "R.P.D."
5. "Până Când Moartea Ne Va Despărți" (featuring Puya & July)
6. "Gata De Orice"
7. "Născut Și Crescut În Pantelimon"
8. "Ceva Pentru Care Merită Să Mori"
9. "Fără Sentimente"
10. "Sunt Eu Un Maniac"
11. "Lacrimi"
12. "Ucigași În Serie"
13. "Jaf Armat"
