= Ulei și apă =

"Ulei și Apă"

Single by B.U.G. Mafia featuring Lalla & So
- Released: July 20, 2016
- Recorded: 2016; Ines Sound & Video (Bucharest, Romania)
- Genre: Hip hop
- Length: 4:10
- Label: Casa Productions
- Songwriters: Alin Demeter; Dragoș Vlad-Neagu; Vlad Irimia
- Producer: Tataee

B.U.G. Mafia singles chronology
"Pe Coastă" (2016)	"Ulei și Apă" (2016)	"Bani, Bani, Bani" (2017)

"Ulei și Apă" (Oil and Water) is a single by Romanian hip hop group B.U.G. Mafia, featuring vocals by Lalla and So. The song has been produced by group member Tataee, mixed by Cristi Dobrică, and was released online as a digital single on July 20, 2016.

== Background ==
Following the release of Pe Coastă, the group announced the single in a video published on their official Facebook account on May 18, 2016. It then premiered on the group's official YouTube account two months later, on July 20. The song features deep house DJ and vocalist Lalla and pop singer So on the chorus.
