= Claudiu Teohari =

Romanian comedian and writer

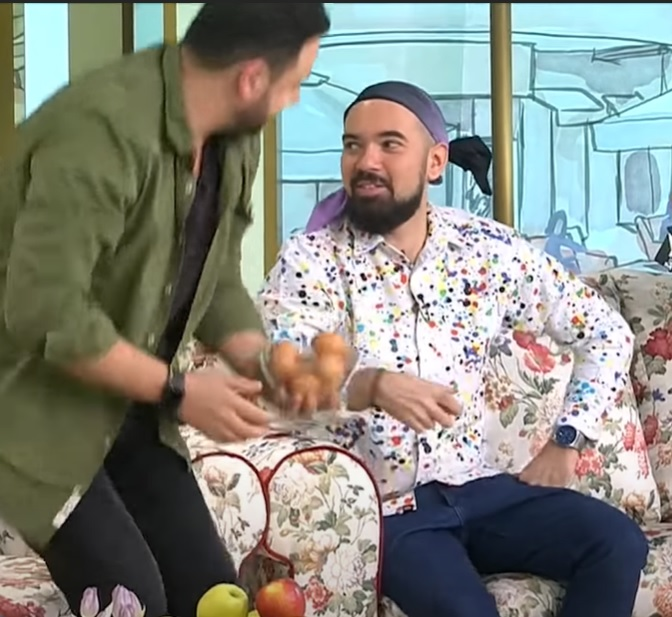
- Teo moments before breaking an egg with his head
- Born: November 11, 1981 (age 44); Bucharest, Romania
- Spouse: Melinda Kutasi Teohari (m. 2015)

Comedy career
- Years active: 2004–present
- Medium: Stand-up; television; film
- Genres: Observational comedy; satire; black comedy; blue comedy; self-deprecation
- Subjects: Everyday life; gender differences; human behavior; social awkwardness; human sexuality; racism; patriotism
- Website: www.facebook.com/teostandup

Claudiu Mihail Teohari (born November 11, 1981), known professionally as Teo, is a Romanian stand-up comedian, writer and occasional actor. After rising to fame in his native Romania as a household name in Bucharest's Deko Café, he was catapulted to internet fame by a series of YouTube recordings of his routines that went viral. As an actor, he made a cameo appearance in Dan Chișu's 2010 directorial debut, WebSiteStory.

He currently lives in Bucharest with his wife, former Playboy playmate Melinda Kutasi.

== Early life and education ==
Claudiu was born in Bucharest in 1981. The grandson of an airline pilot who occasionally flew Romanian dictator Nicolae Ceaușescu's official plane, he grew up in the Bucharest neighborhood of Titan. While attending highschool, he played in a rock band, wrote articles for the school newspaper, and traveled Europe with the George Coșbuc Highschool debate team. He has said that competitive debating had a great influence on the way he came to approach writing and stand-up later in his life. After graduating he attended the Bucharest Academy of Economic Studies where he studied business management. He has stated in interviews that he found it to be a waste of his time and regrets the time spent there.

== Career ==
Teo started considering doing stand-up in 2003, while working in retail. His first public performance took place in early 2004 in Deko Café, a local comedy club in Bucharest, during an open mic night. Prior to this experience, his only encounters with stand-up comedy had been Seinfeld and Robin Williams' Live on Broadway special, which he had seen at a friend's house and described his experience as transformative, in light of Williams' performance. He described his first gig on stage as unpleasant, his lack of experience being noticeable, but his enthusiasm won fellow stand-up comedian Mihai Bobonete's trust, and he was asked to come back for a few weeks before being invited to join the club's official roster as a featured performer. Together with fellow comics Costel Bojog and Viorel Dragu, he became an overnight sensation when, in 2006, he published some of their routines on YouTube. A bit in which he deals with Romanian profanity and the way it reflects gender roles received national coverage and drew considerable attention to a phenomenon considered to be virtually unknown until then in Romania. He started touring extensively with Costel Bojog and Viorel Dragu and also got a job with Leo Burnett Worldwide as a copywriter which he quit when he was able to earn a steady income from stand-up.

Teohari disassociated himself with Deko Café and their brand in 2009 after a series of financial disagreements with the club's management. With Viorel Dragu and Costel Bojog, he founded Club 99, his own comedy club. He opened Pablo Francisco's "Live and Kickin'" tour in Bucharest in front of a sold out Sala Palatului, establishing himself as one of the most noteworthy comedy performers in Romania.

== Television ==
=== După Bloguri ===
In 2009, Teohari debuted his own weekly comedy show on Realitatea TV called După Bloguri, a pun on the După blocuri album title by Romanian hip hop group B.U.G. Mafia. The program examined various aspects of Romanian contemporary culture by focusing on weekly Internet stories about Romanian bloggers and writers. Together with producer Ana Maria Caia, he executive produced the weekly program until its cancellation in late 2009 after 20 episodes. Realitatea TV was consequently sued by Indie Studio, the show's production company, for refusing to pay a part of the production costs.

=== Antena 2 controversy ===
In 2011 Teohari appeared as a guest on the Antena 2 tabloid talk show "It's Showtime!" and sparked controversy after bashing the show's format and stating that tabloid journalists are being intentionally harmful to their audiences. He talked about the experience on his personal blog, saying that he had been banned from appearing on the program again by the show's producers after the incident.

== Nimic Nou ==
In late 2013, Teo started hosting Nimic Nou (Nothing New), a YouTube series created by comedy writers Raul Gheba and Radu Alexandru. Produced by Sector 7 as a biannual video blog that parodies Romanian viral videos, the show has become very successful in Romania.

== Filmography ==
=== Film ===
Year	Film	Role	Notes
2010	WebSiteStory	Stand-up comedian	Cameo appearance

=== Television ===
Year	Title	Role
2009	După Bloguri	Himself (host)

=== Internet ===
Year	Title	Role	Notes
2013–2019	Nimic Nou	Himself (host)	
2016–present	Între Showuri	Himself (co-host)	Podcast
2018–2022 2026- present	CineȘtieCe	Himself (co-host)	Podcast

==== Stand-up specials ====
In 2013, Teohari teamed up with Media Pro to release his first stand-up special on the video-on-demand service Voyo. In 2015 and 2016 respectively, he appeared in two other half-hour specials on Comedy Central Extra. In 2017, Teohari released his first solo full-length special as a free streaming video on YouTube.

Year	Album	Role	Notes
2013	Stand Up Comedy @ Club99	Performer	Stand up
2015	Stand Up Night	Performer	Stand up
2016	Comedy Club	Performer	Stand up
2017	Aprostcalipsa	Performer	Stand up
2018	Afară sunt urși	Performer	Stand up
2019	AIA E!	Performer	Stand up
2020	100% Păreri	Performer	Stand up
