= De Cartier =

Studio album by B.U.G. Mafia
- Released: September 20, 1998
- Recorded: 1997–1998; Schneider Productions (Sebeş, Romania); Midi Sound (Bucharest, Romania); Klaxon Studio (Bucharest, Romania)
- Genres: Gangsta rap; hardcore hip hop
- Length: 69:40
- Labels: Cat Music; Media Services; 101 1122 4
- Producer: Tataee

B.U.G. Mafia chronology
IV: Deasupra tuturor (1997)	De Cartier (1998)	După blocuri (2000)

Singles from De cartier
- 1. "Pentru '98 (feat. July & Andreea)" Released: June 11, 1998

De cartier (From The Hood) is the fourth studio album by Romanian hip hop group B.U.G. Mafia, released September 20, 1998, by Cat Music in Romania. The album went on to sell over 130,000 copies and, due to some of its violently charged content and the group's acerbic statements on Romania's post communist social situation, De Cartier was the source of much controversy upon its release. The frenzy that resulted from this situation was also the source of a massive discreditation campaign by the Romanian media, who capitalized from the subject by intentionally portraying them in a negative light using false information. The public scrutiny lead to an unprecedented amount of pressure which in turn influenced what the group claims to be their "darkest and most complex work to this day", their following album, "După blocuri". Despite having sold 130,000 copies, group member and producer Tataee had estimated the massive piracy affecting the Romanian music market at the time to have put the real album sales closer to 800,000 albums sold.

== Background ==
The recording sessions for the album began in late 1997 and carried on throughout the first half of 1998. Similar to IV: Deasupra tuturor, Tataee was very active in the album's production, though the overall sound differed. Unlike their 1997 effort, which featured a more g-funk oriented sound, De cartier had more hard edged beats that made use of synthesized strings and electric guitars to orchestrate the dramatic sound that carried throughout the album. Longtime collaborators Camil Beldeanu and Eddy Schneider made fewer appearances playing keyboards for Tataee, who instead chose to be more hands on with the production of the album, contributing with keyboards on every track. He has stated in various interviews that the group had just bought their own keyboard and that that was one of the reasons he was able to contribute a significant amount to the album's compositions. A number of songs also use samples taken from iconic gangsta rap acts such as N.W.A and Scarface.

== Content ==
=== Production ===
"Poveste Fără Sfarşit"
One of the group's most well known songs. The guitar solo at the end adds to the track's dramatic tone.

"De Cartier (feat. Cătalina Toma)"
The title track. Features aggressive lyricism

"N'ai Fost Acolo"
Response to critics who said the group's lyrics had no factual basis.

While making De cartier, the group decided to craft an album which would reflect their views on the Romanian society in the late 1990s as inhabitants of a working-class neighborhood in Bucharest. Although rough, the album's tracks provided a more introspective and passionate outlook of working-class life in Romania than the majority of Romanian gangsta rap acts had managed to portray at the time. With soulful songs such as "Poveste fără sfârşit" (Never-ending Story), "Ai grijă de şmenaru' tău" (Make Sure Your Hustler Is Alright) and "Viaţa-i doar un drum spre moarte" (Life Ain't Nothing but a Road to Death) the album worked its way through the controversy, paving B.U.G. Mafia's way to superstardom in Romania.

The success of the album also drew attention of Romanian pop artist Loredana Groza who recruited the group for her 1998 hit single "Lumea E A Mea" (The World Is Mine). The song's also featured the first hip hop music video to be released in Romania, although the group had already shot one for the album's lead single, "Pentru '98" (For 98), but, dissatisfied with its production values, decided to shelve it.

=== Track listing ===
All song titles, notes, samples, writing and production credits are according to the album booklet.

Lyrics by Tataee, Caddy, Uzzi, Cheloo, Puya and Don Baxter.

#	Title	Time	Songwriters	Producers	Additional performers	Additional credits
1	"Intro"	2:10	V.Irimia, A.Demeter, D.Vlad-Neagu, E.Schneider	Tataee, co-produced by Caddy, Uzzi & Eddy Schneider		Keyboards by Tataee & Eddy Schneider
2	"Ghici cine s'a întors"	3:49	V.Irimia, A.Demeter, D.Vlad-Neagu	Tataee, co-produced by Caddy		Keyboards by Tataee
3	"Pentru '98"	4:32	A.Demeter, V.Irmia, D.Vlad-Neagu, C.Beldeanu, C. Andrei	Tataee	Iuliana "July" Petrache, Andreea	Keyboards by Tataee & Camil Beldeanu; Guitar by Cristi Andrei
4	"Când te loveşti de realitate"	4:47	A.Demeter, D.Vlad-Neagu, V.Irimia, V.Sârbu, C.Andrei	Tataee, co-produced by Uzzi & Caddy		Keyboards by Tataee; Guitar by Cristi Andrei
5	"Viaţa'i doar un drum spre moarte"	5:18	V.Irimia, D.Vlad-Neagu, C.Beldeanu, C.Andrei	Caddy	Cătălina Toma	Keyboards by Tataee & Camil Beldeanu; Guitar by Cristi Andrei
6	"Raid mafiot 2"	3:07	A.Demeter, D.Vlad-Neagu, V.Irimia	Tataee, co-produced by Uzzi		Keyboards by Tataee; Bass Guitar by Gabi Mitran
7	"N'ai fost acolo"	4:22	V.Irimia, D.Vlad-Neagu, A.Demeter	Tataee		Keyboards by Tataee; Bass Guitar by Gabi Mitran
8	"Hai să fim HIGH"	4:17	A.Demeter, V.Irimia, D.Vlad-Neagu, D.Gărdescu, E.Schneider	Tataee, co-produced by Uzzi & Caddy	Puya, Cătălina Toma	Keyboards by Tataee & Eddy Schneider
9	"Poveste fără sfârşit"	5:24	V.Irimia, D.Vlad-Neagu, A.Demeter, C.Beldeanu, C.Andrei	Tataee	Cătălina Toma	Bass Guitar by Gabi Mitran; Guitar by Cristi Andrei; Keyboards by Camil Beldeanu & Tataee
10	"Sânge latin"	3:52	D.Vlad-Neagu, V.Irimia, A.Demeter, C.Beldeanu	Tataee		Keyboards by Tataee & Camil Beldeanu
11	"1, 2, 3"	3:27	A.Demeter, V.Irimia, D.Vlad-Neagu, S.Istrati	Tataee & Caddy	Don Baxter, Gunja	Keyboards by Tataee & Camil Beldeanu
12	"De cartier"	4:24	D.Vlad-Neagu, A.Demeter, V.Irimia	Tataee		Keyboards by Tataee
13	"La vorbitor"	4:06	V.Irimia, S.Istrati, A. Demeter, C.Beldeanu, C.Andrei	Tataee, co-produced by Don Baxter		Keyboards by Tataee & Don Baxter; Guitar by Cristi Andrei
14	"Ai grijă de şmenaru' tău"	4:39	V.Irimia, D.Vlad-Neagu, A.Demeter, C.Beldeanu	Tataee	Cătălina Toma	Keyboards by Tataee & Camil Beldeanu
15	"Limbaj de cartier"	5:42	V.Irimia, A.Demeter, D.Vlad-Neagu, C.Ion, C.Andrei	Tataee, co-produced by Uzzi & Caddy	Cheloo, Puya	Guitar by Cristi Andrei

=== Samples ===
- "N'ai fost acolo" contains an interpolation of "Homies & Thugs" by Scarface
- "Raid mafiot 2" contains a sample of "Ruthless Villain" by Eazy-E
