= După blocuri =

Studio album by B.U.G. Mafia
- Released: January 18, 2000
- Recorded: 1999; Magic Sound (Bucharest, Romania)
- Genre: Gangsta rap; hardcore hip hop; boom bap
- Length: 57:53
- Label: Cat Music; Media Services; 101 2000 4
- Producer: Tataee

B.U.G. Mafia chronology
De cartier (1998)	După blocuri (2000)	Întotdeauna pentru totdeauna (2000)

Singles from După blocuri
- 1. "După blocuri" Released: January 2, 2000

După Blocuri (Behind the Buildings) is the fifth studio album by Romanian hip hop group B.U.G. Mafia, released on January 18, 2000, by Cat Music in Romania. Recording sessions for the album took place throughout 1999 at the "Magic Sound" studios in Bucharest. The album features a darker tone than its predecessor, with heavy beats being accompanied by an overall sobriety in its lyricism. It has been categorized by fans and critics alike as the group's darkest work. Production for the album was handled by group member Tataee and some of his frequent collaborators at the time, keyboardist Camil Beldeanu and guitarist Cristi Andrei.

The album is notable for being the first in the group's history to have its tracks fade into one another and for including the hit single "După blocuri", for which B.U.G. Mafia shot their first official video directed by Bogdan Albu in January 2000.

== Background ==
The group started work on the album in late 1998 and recording sessions carried throughout 1999. As their previous album De cartier had sold over 130,000 copies which was unprecedented for a Romanian hip hop group, B.U.G. Mafia were catapulted to superstardom and with that, new problems occurred for them. The Romanian media started capitalizing off their success by publishing false stories and intentionally portraying the group in a demeaning light. The anger and frustration of being unable to publicly defend themselves was put into a large number of the songs recorded for the album thus producing what the critics have called "their darkest work since their debut album".

== Content ==
=== Production ===
"The album's title track served as the album's first single"
from După blocuri. Features aggressive lyricism

In composing the music for the album, Tataee returned to work with studio musicians after in 1998, for De cartier, he had been more hands on with the production, playing much of the album's music on the group's newly-bought keyboard. Camil Beldeanu makes a number of appearances, playing keys on 5 of the album's 19 tracks and Cristi Andrei returns to create a number of funk-influenced guitar riffs, most notably on the album's title track. Romanian composer Viorel Sîrbu was also heavily involved in the production of După blocuri, playing the album's basslines. The overall sound differs significantly from De cartier, as all B.U.G. Mafia and Tataee's productions do from album to album. The heavy, "boom bap"-influenced drums and the haunting synthesizer-keyboard elements account for much of the album's dark feel. The album relies more on live instrumentation rather than sampling. However, "A Fost Odata-n Cartiere" (Once Upon A Time In The Neighbourhoods) references a famous moment in the group's history through a sample of the audience at the 1998 "Ballantine's Music Awards", who had felt that the B.U.G. Mafia deserved the "Song of the Year" award that went to Holograf, by chanting the group's name. Romanian pop singers Roxana Andronescu and Nicoleta "Nico" Matei make guest appearances on four of the album's songs. Matei would later return to collaborate with B.U.G. Mafia for their 2002 single "Cine E Cu Noi" (Who's With Us?).

=== Lyricism ===
The album's lyrics represent a complex and introspective look cast upon the working class life in the poverty-ridden late 1990s post communist Romania. The group also addresses its long-standing feud with the Romanian media, who had retaliated a year earlier by capitalizing on slanderous articles suggesting that the B.U.G. Mafia had no respect for its fans or that they asked for ridiculous amounts of money to perform live. Songs such as "Carteru' Pantelimon" (The Pantelimon Neighbourhood), "Tine-o Tot Asa" (Keep It Up), "Anturaju'" (The Entourage) and "Mahoarcă" (Weed) depict the life of low-income inner-city youths in Romania and some of their views and opinions about the contemporary society. "A Fost Odată-n Cartiere" ("Once Upon a Time in The Neighbourhood", named significantly after Ice Cube's song) serves as a short biography of the group, while "Cât A Trăit" (While He Lived) explores opioid use disorders through a narrative account of the heroin-related descent into addiction and consequent death of a close friend of group member Uzzi.

The album's title track roughly translates to "In The Projects" and its lyrics depict the life in the working class inner city neighborhoods in Bucharest specifically and in Romania in general. The group shot its first official music video for the song, which was released as a single in January, 2000. Even though they had already appeared in the "Lumea e a mea" (The World Is Mine) video two years earlier, the group regards "După blocuri" as their first video as "Lumea e a mea" (The World Is Mine) was a single released by Romanian dance artist Loredana Groza.

== Track listing ==
All song titles, notes, samples, writing and production credits are according to the album booklet.

Lyrics by Tataee, Caddy, Uzzi, Mari, Co-G and Puya

#	Title	Time	Songwriters	Producers	Additional performers	Additional credits
1	"Intro"	1:58	V.Irimia, A.Demeter, D.Vlad-Neagu	Tataee, co-produced by Uzzi	Laura Mesescu	Keyboards by Tataee; Bass Guitar by Viorel Sîrbu
2	"Cartieru' Pantelimon"	4:37	V.Irimia, A.Demeter, D.Vlad-Neagu, C.Beldeanu	Tataee, co-produced by Caddy & Uzzi	Nico	Keyboards by Camil Beldeanu; Bass Guitar by Viorel Sîrbu
3	"Interludiu"	0:34			Țeavă	
4	"Ține-o Tot Așa"	4:02	D.Vlad-Neagu, V.Irimia, C.Andrei	Tataee, co-produced by Uzzi & Caddy		Keyboards by Tataee; Bass Guitar by Viorel Sîrbu; Guitar by Cristi Andrei
5	"...Rămâne așa"	0:32	V.Irimia, D.Vlad-Neagu, A.Demeter, C.Andrei	Tataee, co-produced by Uzzi & Caddy		Keyboards by Tataee; Bass Guitar by Viorel Sîrbu; Guitar by Cristi Andrei
6	"La Greu"	4:26	A.Demeter, D.Vlad-Neagu, V.Irimia, C.Andrei	Tataee		Keyboards by Tataee; Bass Guitar by Viorel Sîrbu; Guitar by Cristi Andrei
7	"Capu' Sus"	4:52	V.Irimia, D.Vlad-Neagu, A.Demeter, C.Beldeanu	Tataee	Roxana Andronescu	Keyboards by Tataee & Camil Beldeanu
8	"Cât A Trăit"	3:22	A.Demeter, V.Irimia, C.Beldeanu, C.Andrei	Tataee, co-produced by Uzzi	Puya	Keyboards by Tataee & Camil Beldeanu; Bass Guitar by Viorel Sîrbu; Guitar by Cristi Andrei; Additional Vocals by Roxana Andronescu
9	"Combinații"	0:38			Greu'	
10	"Anturaju'"	4:32	D.Vlad-Neagu, V.Irimia, A.Demeter	Tataee		Keyboards by Tataee
11	"Interludiu"	0:22			Pleșa	
12	"Unii Sug Pula"	4:18	D.Vlad-Neagu, A.Demeter, V.Irimia, C.Beldeanu, C.Andrei	Tataee		Keyboards by Tataee & Camil Beldeanu; Bass Guitar by Viorel Sîrbu; Guitar by Cristi Andrei
13	"A Fost Odată-n Cartiere"	4:37	V.Irimia, A.Demeter, C.Beldeanu, C.Andrei	Tataee, co-produced by Uzzi	Luchian, Nico	Keyboards by Tataee & Camil Beldeanu; Guitar by Cristi Andrei
14	"Progres"	0:56			Cătălin	
15	"Două Dube"	2:38	V.Irimia, A.Demeter	Tataee, co-produced by Uzzi		Arrangements by Uzzi & Tataee
16	"Mafia și M&G"	4:42	V.Irimia, A.Demeter, D.Vlad-Neagu, M.Codreanu, G.Codreanu, C.Andrei	Tataee	M&G	Keyboards by Tataee; Bass Guitar by Viorel Sîrbu; Guitar by Cristi Andrei
17	"Mahoarcă"	4:35	V.Irimia, A.Demeter, D.Vlad-Neagu, C.Andrei, R.Bloch	Tataee	Roxana Andronescu	Keyboards by Tataee; Bass Guitar by Viorel Sîrbu; Guitar by Cristi Andrei; Flute by Rudolf Bloch
18	"După Blocuri"	4:24	V.Irimia, A.Demeter, D.Vlad-Neagu, C.Beldeanu, C.Andrei	Tataee, co-produced by Uzzi & Caddy		Keyboards by Tataee & Camil Beldeanu; Bass Guitar by Viorel Sîrbu; Guitar by Cristi Andrei
19	"Outro"	1:34	V.Irimia, A.Demeter, D.Vlad-Neagu, C.Andrei	Tataee, co-produced by Uzzi & Caddy	Greu'	Keyboards by Tataee

== Personnel ==
- B.U.G. Mafia - executive producer
- Vlad "Tataee" Irimia - performer/producer/mixer
- Dragoş "Daddy Caddy" Vlad-Neagu - performer
- Alin "Uzzi" Demeter - performer
- Marian "Mari" Codreanu - performer
- Gabriel "Co-G" Codreanu - performer
- Dragoş "Puya" Gardescu - performer
- Luchian - performer
- Greu' - additional vocals
- Țeavă - performer and additional vocals
- Cătălin - performer and additional vocals
- Pleșa - performer and additional vocals
- Laura Mesescu - performer and additional vocals
- Roxana Andronescu - performer and additional vocals
- Nicoleta "Nico" Matei - performer
- Rudolf Bloch - flute
- Cristi Andrei - guitars
- Viorel Sîrbu - bass guitar
- Camil Beldeanu - keyboards
- Cristi Dobrică - mix engineer/masterer
- Cornel Lazia - photographer
- Alin Surdu - designer
