= IV: Deasupra tuturor =

Studio album by B.U.G. Mafia
- Released: November 10, 1997
- Recorded: 1996–1997; Schneider Productions (Sebeş, Romania); Magic Sound (Bucharest, Romania); Midi Sound (Bucharest, Romania)
- Genres: Gangsta rap; G-funk
- Length: 65:05
- Labels: Cat Music; Media Services
- Producer: Tataee

B.U.G. Mafia chronology
Născut şi crescut în Pantelimon (1996)	IV: Deasupra tuturor (1997)	De Cartier (1998)

Singles from IV: Deasupra tuturor
- 1. "Hoteluri (feat. July)" Released: June 9, 1997

IV: Deasupra tuturor is the second studio album by Romanian hip hop group B.U.G. Mafia. It was released on November 10, 1997, by Cat Music in Romania, receiving universal acclaim from the group's fans as the way the tracks sounded was noticeably different from the previous three albums. It went on to sell over 55,000 copies with basically no promotion at all, due to the violent nature of its content, and it remains one of the best-selling hip hop albums in Romania. B.U.G. Mafia's fans have repeatedly ranked it as a classic among the group's albums.

== Track listing ==
=== Track listing ===
All song titles, notes, samples, writing and production credits are according to the album booklet.

Lyrics by Tataee, Caddilac, Uzzi, Puya and Don Baxter.

#	Title	Time	Songwriters	Producers	Additional performers	Additional credits
1	"Socului și Capăt 14"	1:18	V.Irimia, A.Demeter, D.Vlad-Neagu	Tataee, co-produced by Caddy and Uzzi		
2	"Înc-o Dată"	3:49	V.Irimia, A.Demeter, D.Vlad-Neagu	Tataee, co-produced by Caddy and Uzzi		
3	"Respectă-ți Dușmanu'"	4:01	A.Demeter, V.Irimia	Tataee, co-produced by Uzzi		
4	"Hoteluri"	4:42	A.Demeter, D.Vlad-Neagu, V.Irimia	Tataee, co-produced by Uzzi & Caddy		
5	"Fă-o ca-n Pantelimon"	0:52	A.Demeter, V.Irimia, E.Schneider	Tataee, co-produced by Uzzi		Keyboards by Eddy Schineider
6	"Jucător Adevărat"	3:51	D.Vlad-Neagu, V.Irimia, Camil Beldeanu	Tataee	Raluca	Keyboards by Camil Beldeanu; Bass Guitar by Sabin Țăran
7	"Mă Doare-n P*#@"	0:53	D.Gărdescu, A.Demeter		Puya	
8	"Delicvent la 15 Ani"	4:10	A.Demeter, V.Irimia, D.Vlad-Neagu, E.Schneider	Tataee, co-produced by Uzzi, Caddy & Eddy Schneider		Keyboards by Eddy Schneider
9	"Marijuana II"	4:17	V.Irimia, D.Vlad-Neagu, A.Demeter, D. Gărdescu, C.Beldeanu	Tataee	Puya, Raluca, Don Baxter	Bass Guitar by Camil Beldeanu; Keyboards by Camil Beldeanu
10	"Show TV"	3:52	S.Istrati, D.Vlad-Neagu, V.Irimia, A.Demeter		Don Baxter	
11	"Nimic mai Presus"	4:53	A.Demeter, V.Irimia, D.Vlad-Neagu, C.Beldeanu	Tataee	Raluca	Keyboards by Camil Beldeanu; Guitar by Camil Beldeanu; Bass Guitar by Sabin Țăran
12	"Băiat de Colțu' Străzii"	4:19	A.Demeter, V.Irimia	Tataee, co-produced by Uzzi		
13	"Pantelimon 100%"	3:54	V.Irimia, A. Demeter, E.Schneider, C.Beldeanu	Tataee, co-produced by Eddy Schneider		Keyboards by Camil Beldeanu
14	"Viața Merge Înainte"	4:38	V.Irimia, D.Vlad-Neagu, A.Demeter, C.Beldeanu	Camil Beldeanu		Keyboards by Camil Beldeanu; Guitar by Camil Beldeanu; Bass Guitar by Cristi Solomon
15	"9 mm"	4:52	V.Irimia, A.Demeter, D.Vlad-Neagu, D.Gărdescu	Tataee, co-produced by Uzzi & Caddy	Gunja	
16	"Băieții Sunt Băieți și Femeile Sunt Curve"	2:48	A.Demeter, V.Irimia, S.Istrati	Tataee, co-produced by Uzzi	Don Baxter, Robertică "Boxeru'"	
17	"Respect pentru Cartier"	4:22	D.Vlad-Neagu, A.Demeter, V.Irimia, C.Beldeanu	Tataee, co-produced by Uzzi		Keyboards by Camil Beldeanu; Guitar by Cristi Andrei; Bass Guitar by Cristi Solomon
18	"Vii sau Morți"	4:55	A.Demeter, D.Vlad-Neagu, V.Irimia	Tataee, co-produced by Uzzi		
19	"Gigi Ultra Plus"	0:32	S.Istrati, V.Irimia		Don Baxter	Keyboards by Tataee & Don Baxter
