= Puya (rapper) =

Romanian singer (born 1979)

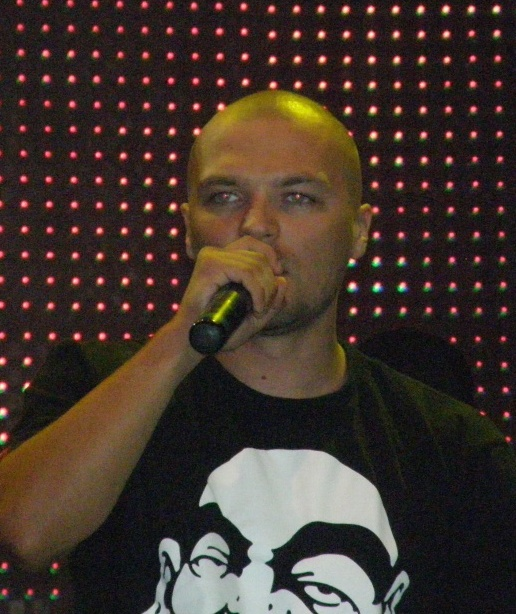
- Puya in July 2009

Background information
- Born: Dragoș Gărdescu; 22 July 1979 (age 47); Bucharest, Romania
- Genres: Hip hop; Gangsta rap; Dance
- Occupations: Singer; songwriter; rapper; television personality
- Years active: 1996–present
- Labels: MediaPro Music; Roton Music; Cat Music; Global Records; Music Expert Company; Scandalos Music
- Spouse: Melinda Gărdescu (m. 2011)
- Children: 3

Dragoș Gărdescu (Romanian pronunciation: [ˈdra.ɡoʃ ɡərˈdes.ku]; born 22 July 1979), known under the stage name Puya, is a Romanian rapper, singer, songwriter and television personality. Widely regarded as one of the most prolific figures of the Romanian rap and hip-hop scene, he founded La Familia in 1997 alongside Tudor Sișu.

== Biography ==
Puya, whose real name is Dragoș Gărdescu, was born on July 22, 1979, in Bucharest. He grew up with his three brothers in the Balta Albă neighborhood, Sălăjan, Bucharest, learning the "unwritten rules of the street" from an early age. He met Tudor Sișu in the Balta Albă, Sălăjan neighborhood of Bucharest, where they founded the rap group La Familia.

== Musical career ==
=== La Familia. First tenure (1997–2011) ===
He has been active on the hip-hop scene since 1994. He released his first album with La Familia in 1997, titled Băieți de Cartier (Hood Boys), and he signed his first contract with a production company at the age of 17. In 2007, he founded the NGO Spartacus Agency, which deals with defending the rights of prisoners and combating drug use. The rapper has also held anti-drug campaigns in high schools across the country.

In 2009, Puya won a lawsuit against the band B.U.G. Mafia for using the name "La Familia". In 2012, Puya released the single of the year "Maidanez" (Stray) with Doddy, Mahia, Posset and Alex Velea. In 2014, Puya released the song Strigă! (Shout) with Inna, the song enjoying success in Europe.

He was active in the band for around 10 years, with the last album being released in 2006, with the next one being released in 2010. Puya announced the new album "La Familia", but it was never fully produced. Another attempt took place in 2017, 20 years after the band's existence, which this time was successful, and the new album was released on June 9, 2017.

=== Second tenure (2017–present) ===
Sișu and Puya reunited in 2017, releasing the first album under the name of La Familia since the name recovery called "Codul Bunelor Maniere" (The Code Of Good Manners) which contained the "Dulce Răzbunare" (Sweet Vengeance) song featuring M3thaphour, which contained lyrics against Șatra B.E.N.Z. After six years, they released another album called "Foarte" (Very).

== Personal life ==
Puya's first solo material was an unreleased one, but it pleased the speakers of lucky fans. An atypical collaboration for the rap scene at that time was the song "Nu te grăbi" (Don't Rush) featuring Paula Seling. Seven years later, Puya brings Lora, Keo, Alex Velea, Cabron and more to "Muzică de tolăneală și depravare". At the same time, Puya announced his solo career on music TV channels, through the video "Viață nouă" (New Life).

In September 2010, his girlfriend gave birth to their first child, a baby girl, making the singer a father. The two met in 2006. Puya and his wife, Melinda, currently have three children, Melissa, Iuliana, and Natalia.

He is a fan of rappers Snoop Dogg, Pitbull, 2Pac, The Game, Dr. Dre and 50 Cent. His only tattoo depicts 2Pac on his back. These artists are cited as the reason why rapper Puya started his musical career.

== Other media ==
=== Reality shows ===
In 2023, Puya, along with his wife Melinda Gărdescu, participated in the show America Express, broadcast on Antena 1.

Puya has been a juror in the X Factor musical contest since season 11.

== Discography ==
=== Studio albums ===
List of studio albums
Title	Album details
Până la capăt în felul meu	Released: 2001; Format: CD, digital download; Label: Cat Music
Muzică De Tolaneală & Depravare	Released: 2008; Format: CD, digital download; Label: Roton Music
Românisme (Part I and II)	Released: 2009; Format: CD, digital download; Label: MediaPro Music
Aventurile Domnului Puy(A)	Released: 2019; Format: CD, digital download; Label: Scandalos Music
Oameni Can Noi	Released: 2025; Format: CD, digital download; Label: Scandalos Music
