= B.U.G. Mafia prezintă CASA =

Compilation album by B.U.G. Mafia
- Released: February 20, 2002
- Recorded: 2001–2002; Boom Sound (Bucharest, Romania); Magic Sound (Bucharest, Romania)
- Genre: Hip hop
- Length: 50:04
- Label: Casa Productions/Cat Music/Media Services/Sony Music; 101 2223 4
- Producer: Tataee (also exec.)

B.U.G. Mafia chronology
Întotdeauna pentru totdeauna (2000)	B.U.G. Mafia prezintă CASA (2002)	Băieţii Buni (2003)

Singles from B.U.G. Mafia prezintă CASA
- 1. "Cine E Cu Noi (feat. Nico)" Released: January 30, 2002; 2. "O Vorbă De Pe Stradă (Mahsat feat. XXL & 10 Grei & Villy)" Released: May 20, 2002

B.U.G. Mafia prezintă CASA (B.U.G. Mafia presents CASA) is a compilation album by B.U.G. Mafia. It was released in 2002 and was the first release on their then newly established Casa Productions. Featured on the album is a bevy of acts who were among the earliest to sign to Casa Productions, many of whom quickly became disassociated with the label without seeing their own projects come to fruition. B.U.G. Mafia perform just two tracks: "Cine E Cu Noi" (Who's With Us), a collaboration with Romanian soul singer Nicoleta "Nico" Matei that was released as the first single and became the disc's most noted, and "Toți Borfașii" (All The Thugs).

B.U.G. Mafia are only sparsely heard on the album, performing just two tracks, which became the disc's most noted. Another one of the album's stand-out moments is the Tataee-produced track, "O Vorbă de pe Stradă" (A Word from the Street), performed by Mahsat, XXL & 10 Grei and Villy. The track was an answer to, and snubbed, the existing critical reaction to Romanian hip hop. For Tataee as a producer, the album was the last in which he used a 1990s Public Enemy and N.W.A-influenced production style, sampling drum breaks and making use of heavily synthesized sounds.

== Track listing ==
#	Title	Producer(s)	Performer(s)	Sample(s)
1	"Intro"	Tataee	Uzzi	
2	"E vorba de bani (Remix)"	Tataee, Grasu XXL (co-producer)	XXL & 10 Grei	
3	"O Altă Zi"	Villy, Tataee (co-producer)	Villy	
4	"Toţi Borfaşii"	Tataee, Villy, Uzzi, Caddy (co-producers)	B.U.G. Mafia	
5	"În Casă (Interlude)"	Tataee, Co-G, Mari (co-producers)	Co-G	
6	"Adevărul Costă Scump"	Tataee, Gabone, Uzzi (co-producers)	Anturaj	Sergiu Nicolaescu - Duelul
7	"Zi-mi De Unde Eşti"	Tataee, Uzzi, Villy (co-producers)	M&G	
8	"Cine E Cu Noi"	Tataee, Uzzi (co-producer)	B.U.G. Mafia, Nico	
9	"Îngeri Pierduţi"	Tataee	Caddy, Grasu XXL, Mario V	
10	"Prietena ta"	Tataee, Villy (co-producer)	Villy, Paco 10 Grei	
11	"La Furat (Toată viaţa mea)"	Tataee, Caddy (co-producer)	Luchian	
12	"O Vorbă De Pe Stradă"	Blatjargon, Tataee, Villy (co-producers)	Mahsat, XXL & 10Grei, Villy	
13	"Outro"	Tataee, Uzzi (co-producer)	Tataee, Uzzi	Isaac Hayes - "The Look of Love"
