= Băieții Buni =

Studio album by B.U.G. Mafia
- Released: December 7, 2003
- Recorded: 2002–2003; Ines Sound & Video (Bucharest, Romania)
- Genre: Gangsta rap; hardcore hip hop
- Length: 72:22
- Label: Casa Production; Cat Music; Media Services; 101 2000 4
- Producer: Tataee

B.U.G. Mafia chronology
B.U.G. Mafia prezintă CASA (2002)	Băieții Buni (2003)	Viața noastră (Vol.1) (2006)

Singles from Băieții Buni
- 1. "Românește" Released: December 1, 2003; 2. "O lume nebună, nebună de tot (feat. ViLLy)" Released: March 23, 2004

Băieții Buni (The Goodfellas, a reference to the 1990 Martin Scorsese movie) is the eighth studio album by Romanian hip hop group B.U.G. Mafia. It was released on December 7, 2003, by Casa Productions/Cat Music in Romania and it was the first studio album to be released by the group on their own imprint, Casa Productions.

== Track listing ==
1. "Intro"
2. "Să Sară-N Aer"
3. "Flocea Din Socului" feat. Flocea
4. "În Anii Ce Au Trecut"
5. "Gherila PTM" feat. Villy
6. "Discuție Pe Dig" feat. Primo
7. "Iarbă Și Alcool" feat. XXL, 10 Grei, Mashat, Luchian & Primo
8. "Pula Mea..." feat. Brasco
9. "Muzica De Noapte" feat. M&G
10. "O Lume Nebună, Nebună De Tot" feat. Villy
11. "La Noroc"
12. "Românește"
13. "Garda" feat. Mario
14. "Exces Perves" feat. XXL, 10 Grei & Villy
15. "În Oglindă" feat. Primo
16. "Drumu' Spre Pârnaie"
17. "Swamp"
18. "40 Km/H" feat. Mary
19. "Cine Are Cu Noi"
20. "Față-N Față 2"
21. "Prin Cartieru' Minunat"
22. "Outro"
