= Înc-o zi, înc-o poveste =

EP by B.U.G. Mafia
- Released: June 8, 1996
- Recorded: 1996; Q-Bic Sound System Studio (Bucharest, Romania)
- Genre: Gangsta rap
- Length: 28:29
- Label: Cat Music; Media Services; Sony Music
- Producer: Tataee

B.U.G. Mafia chronology
Mafia (1995)	Înc-o zi, înc-o poveste (1996)	Născut şi crescut în Pantelimon (1996)

Singles from Înc-o zi, înc-o poveste
- 1. "Pantelimonu' Petrece (feat. July)" Released: July 20, 1996

Înc-o zi, înc-o poveste (Another Day, Another Story) is a ten track EP released by B.U.G. Mafia on June 8, 1996. It was their first release after they signed with Cat Music, local branch of Sony Records, on their first real professional record deal. It was released after Mafia and capitalized on their newfound success. This was the group's first material to produce a hit single when the track "Pantelimonu' Petrece" (Pantelimon's having a party), a collaboration with a young female singer named Iuliana “July” Petrache, was released as an unofficial single. The song had heavy radio-airplay being later re-edited on the Viata Noastra Vol.1 anniversary album and even having a music video, an idea which received negative feedback at the time the original track was released. It sold extremely well for its time in Romanian music, approximately 22,000 copies.

== Track listing ==
1. "Intro"
2. "Înc-o zi, înc-o poveste"
3. "Marijuana" (featuring Marijuana)
4. "Pantelimonu' Petrece" (featuring July)
5. "Ruxy"
6. "Psihopatu"
7. "Interviu cu un criminal"
8. "Viață de borfaș"
9. "De la noi pentru voi"
10. "Moarte pentru moarte"
