= Întotdeauna pentru totdeauna =

Studio album by B.U.G. Mafia
- Released: October 17, 2000
- Recorded: 2000; Magic Sound Studios (Bucharest, Romania)
- Genre: Gangsta rap
- Length: 45:57
- Label: Cat Music/Media Services/Sony Music; 101 2077 4
- Producer: Tataee

B.U.G. Mafia chronology
După blocuri (2000)	Întotdeauna pentru totdeauna (2000)	B.U.G. Mafia prezintă CASA (2002)

Singles from Întotdeauna pentru totdeauna
- 1. "Un 2 şi trei de 0 (feat. Villy)" Released: May 17, 2000; 2. "Poezie de stradă" Released: June 8, 2001

Întotdeauna pentru totdeauna (Together forever) is the sixth studio album by Romanian hip hop group B.U.G. Mafia. It was released on October 17, 2000, by Cat Music in Romania. Recording sessions for the album took place in 2000 at the Magic Sound studios in Bucharest, Romania. The album's name is an untranslatable Romanian play on words, basically meaning that the group will always remain unchanged so that they can go into history, thus being remembered forever. B.U.G. Mafia's official website mentions this album as being one of their most underrated, despite its sales being above average.

Upon release, Întotdeauna pentru totdeauna received generally positive reviews from music critics and earned considerable sales success, sparking two successful singles.

== Track listing ==
Source: Discogs

All song titles, notes, samples, writing and production credits are according to the album booklet.

Lyrics by Tataee, Caddy, Uzzi, Puya, M&G, Maximilian.

#	Title	Time	Songwriters	Producers	Additional Performers	Additional Credits
1	"Runda A 7-a (Intro)"	2:09	V.Irimia, A.Demeter, D.Vlad-Neagu, J.M. Jarre	Tataee		Keyboards by Tataee
2	"3 Băieți"	4:50	V.Irimia, A.Demeter, D.Vlad-Neagu	Tataee		Keyboards by Tataee
3	"Fără bani"	3:52	A.Demeter, D.Vlad-Neagu, V.Irimia, C.Beldeanu	Tataee	M&G	Keyboards by Tataee & Camil Beldeanu
4	"Cuvinte grele"	5:45	D.Vlad-Neagu, V.Irimia, A.Demeter, D.Gardescu, C.Husaru	Tataee	Puya, Luchian, Maximilian, Pacha Man, Villy	Keyboards by Tataee
5	"Între noapte și zi"	4:02	V.Irimia, D.Vlad-Neagu, A.Demeter, S.Stone	Tataee	Monica "Moni-K" Mândrescu	Keyboards by Tataee & Camil Beldeanu
6	"Sus în fum"	2:33	A.Demeter, D.Vlad-Neagu, V.Irimia	Tataee	Nicoleta "Nico" Matei	
7	"Zi de zi"	4:57	V.Irimia, D.Vlad-Neagu, A.Demeter, C.Beldeanu	Tataee	Villy	Keyboards by Tataee & Camil Beldeanu
8	"Estu' sălbatic"	4:09	A.Demeter, V.Irimia, D.Vlad-Neagu	Tataee		Keyboards by Tataee & Uzzi
9	"Fete suspecte"	3:58	V.Irimia, D.Vlad-Neagu, A.Demeter, V.Kanalas, J.Brown, F.Wesley, J.Starks	Tataee	Cătălina Toma	Keyboards by Tataee & Uzzi
10	"Un 2 și trei de 0"	5:02	D.Vlad-Neagu, V.Irimia, A.Demeter, C.Beldeanu	Tataee	Villy	Keyboards by Tataee & Camil Beldeanu
11	"Poezie de stradă"	4:37	A.Demeter, V.Irimia, D.Vlad-Neagu	Tataee		Keyboards by Tataee & Uzzi

== Sample credits ==
"Runda A 7-a (Intro)"

- Ethnicolor by Jean Michel Jarre.

"Fete Suspecte"

- The Payback by James Brown.

"Între Noapte și Zi"

- If You Want Me to Stay by Sly and the Family Stone.
