= R.A.C.L.A. =

Romanian hip hop group

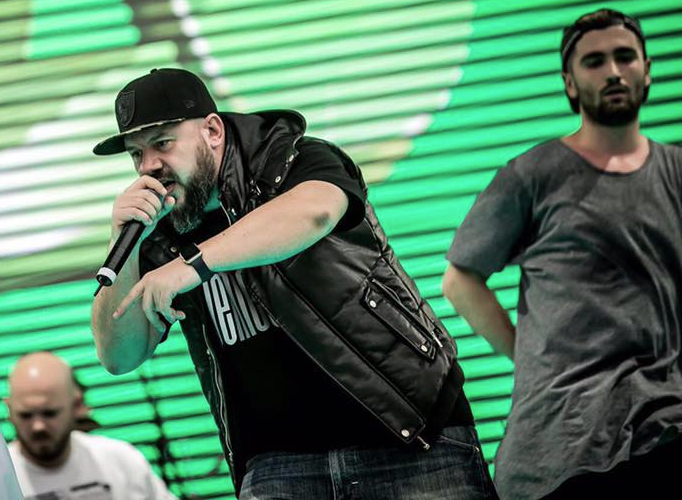
- From left to right: DJ Grewu, Rimaru, TKE

Background information
- Origin: Bucharest, Romania
- Genres: Hip hop; Political hip hop; Hardcore hip hop
- Years active: 1993–present (hiatuses 2007-2015, 2017-present)
- Labels: Kromm Studio; AMMA Record; East & Art; A&A Records; Roton; MediaPro Music; Universal Music
- Members: Rimaru
- Past members: Clonatu'; K-Gula; DJ Dox; DJ Swamp; Connect-R
- Website: facebook.com/RACLA93

R.A.C.L.A. (an abbreviation of Rime Alese Care Lovesc Adânc - Handpicked Rhymes with a Deeper Meaning) is a Romanian hip hop group, founded in 1993 in Bucharest by brothers Călin "Rimaru" Ionescu and Daniel "Clonatu'" Ionescu. The group released the first Romanian hip hop album, Rap-Sodia Efectului Defectului (A Rap-sody for the Shortcoming's Consequence), in 1995 on Kromm Studio, an independent record label and quickly became one of first and most critically acclaimed hip hop acts in Romania. Following Clonatu's departure from the group in 1998, the group went through numerous personnel changes, with Rimaru remaining the sole constant member throughout the years. Originally known among its fans as a hardcore and political rap group, they would later gain a larger fan base in their native Romania following their collaboration with pop singer Anda Adam in 1999.

In the mid and late 1990s, R.A.C.L.A. also gained notoriety for their involvement in a violent conflict with gangsta rap group B.U.G. Mafia and some of their affiliates at the time, such as La Familia and Il-Egal. The dispute initially produced a number of diss tracks from both sides and would later lead to physical altercations between members of the groups. While never officially announcing their hiatus, the group became largely inactive for a number of years following the release of their fifth album in 2005 and group member Connect-R's departure in 2007. Rimaru made a number of infrequent appearances as a solo artist and, as of 2014, has returned to performing under the group name, while also recruiting DJ GreWu, DJ Semplaru and rappers EyeKon and later TKE and Boka, as touring members of R.A.C.L.A.

== Sexual harassment allegations ==
In October 2017, Adevărul reported that a number of women accused group founder Călin "Rimaru" Ionescu of sexually harassing, threatening or assaulting them during his time as a copywriter at Centrade Cheil, an advertising agency in Bucharest.

Although some of the cited stories had taken place as far back as 2014, some of the victims stated their complaints were met with indifference. A number of quoted stories featured screenshots of Facebook conversations during which Ionescu had been explicitly verbally abusive and had threatened victims with physical violence for refusing his sexual advances, while others recounted a number of instances during which they had been sexually or physically assaulted by him, for similar reasons.

Centrade Cheil CEO Radu Florescu alleged during an interview that the human resources department had only received one complaint in 2014 regarding Ionescu's behavior and that he had been reprimanded accordingly. The company claimed to have been unaware of any other incidents.

In a later press release, Ionescu did not dispute the veracity of the claims, but defended his behavior by claiming the victims' failure to take legal action implied they had not felt threatened by him, while suggesting that the Harvey Weinstein sexual misconduct allegations had provided them with a platform for personal advertising. Following additional allegations, Ionescu was subsequently fired from his position at Centrade Cheil.

Ionescu later admitted to the authenticity of all the Facebook conversations released by victims during an interview, and apologized for his actions, while continuing to claim his threats should not have been taken seriously. In 2022, Ionescu lost the civil lawsuit in which he had attempted to claim civil damages from the women he had harassed and was instead himself obligated by the court to pay them 6000 euros in lawyer's fees.

== Discography ==
=== Studio albums ===
- Rap-Sodia Efectului Defectului, 1995 ("A Rap-sody for the Shortcoming's Consequence")
- Cei care te calcă pe cap, 1997 ("The Ones That Step On Your Head")
- Rime de bine, 1998 ("Rhymes For Good")
- Plus infinit, 2000 ("Plus Infinity")
- DEXteritate, 2005 ("DEXterity")
- Raport Major, 2016 ("Major Report")

=== Unreleased albums ===
- Incursiune în real, 1996 ("Incursion In Real")
- ElectroShok, 2004

=== Extended plays ===
- Pătratul roşu, 2001 ("Red Square")
