= Rap-Sodia efectului defectului =

Rap-Sodia Efectului Defectului

Studio album by R.A.C.L.A.
- Released: May 15, 1995
- Recorded: 1995
- Studio: Uni-Plus Multimedia (Bucharest, Romania)
- Genre: Political hip-hop; hardcore hip-hop
- Length: 43:57
- Label: Kromm Studio; Amma Record
- Producer: DJ Sonar; R.A.C.L.A.

R.A.C.L.A. chronology
Rap-Sodia Efectului Defectului (1995)	Cei Care Te Calcă pe Cap (1997)

Reissue Cover
- Amma Record reissue cover

Rap-Sodia Efectului Defectului (English: A Rap-sody for the Shortcoming's Consequence) is the debut studio album from the hip-hop group R.A.C.L.A. and the first Romanian hip-hop album.

== Track listing ==
1. Intro
2. "Probleme majore"
3. "Jungla din stradă"
4. "Nu mai vrem să răbdați"
5. "Moțiune de cenzură"
6. "Război = orori și crimă"
7. "Vis ucigaș"
8. "Efectul defectului"
9. "Hip-Hop ura"
10. "Stil rău"
11. "Canalu' lu' Neluțu"
12. "Mahala"
13. "Pentru paray"
14. Outro
