= Tataee =

Tata Vlad
- Tata Vlad on stage in Milan.

Background information
- Born: Vlad Irimia; October 17, 1976 (age 49); Sebeş, Alba, Romania
- Origin: Pantelimon, Bucharest, Romania
- Genres: Hip hop; pop
- Occupations: Rapper; songwriter; record producer; entrepreneur
- Instruments: Vocals; synthesizer; keyboards; drum machine; sampler
- Years active: 1991–present
- Labels: AMMA Record; Cat Music; Casa Productions; Legend Audio
- Website: twitter.com/tataee

Vlad Irimia (Romanian pronunciation: [ˈvlad iriˈmi.a]; born October 17, 1976), primarily known by his stage name Tata Vlad, formerly Tataee ([taˈta.(j)e]), is a Romanian record producer, rapper, record executive, and music manager. He is one of the founders of the influential Romanian hip hop trio B.U.G. Mafia, also having produced albums and overseeing the careers of many acclaimed Romanian hip hop artists, such as La Familia, XXL & 10 Grei, Mahsat and JerryCo. As a music producer, he is frequently credited as one of the pioneers and key figures in the architecture of the Romanian version of gangsta rap, a style of music that closely resembles its American counterpart but also includes various local influences derived from Balkan music or, more recently, electronica.

Tata Vlad began his career in music as a solo artist and he later found fame as a member of the gangsta rap group B.U.G. Mafia with Alin "Uzzi" Demeter and Dragoș "Caddilac" Vlad-Neagu, with whom he popularized the use of explicit lyrics in rap to detail the violence of street life. Their 1998 album, "De Cartier", released under Cat Music in Romania led them to become one of the country's best-selling performing artists, as well as one of the most respected Romanian hip hop groups. Later in his career, he worked with Romanian artists such as Akcent, Andreea Antonescu, Bitză, Cristina Spătar or Adriana Rusu, receiving credit for changing and improving their sound.

Following the success of B.U.G. Mafia's Băieții Buni in 2003, Tata Vlad focused on producing music for various other artists. He started his own record label, Legend Audio, in 2002, as he assumed his role as a record producer and music executive. In 2005, he signed Romanian hip hop artist JerryCo who released his debut single in late 2009 following a four-year work period with Tata Vlad on his first album, "Orice E Posibil" (Everything Is Possible), released in 2010 by Legend Audio in Romania.

== Early life and education ==
Tataee was born Vlad Irimia on October 17, 1976, in Sebeș, a city in Alba County, central Romania, southern Transylvania. His father was as a mechanical engineer on various construction sites for hydroelectric power stations in Transylvania, while his mother worked as an accountant. Irimia spent his childhood years in numerous blue-collar working colonies adjacent to the various dams his father was hired to work on. His mother, an amateur singer, would occasionally perform publicly at friends' weddings and baptism parties, while also encouraging the young Irimia to sing. In 1981, his family relocated to Caransebeș and then to Drobeta Turnu-Severin for the ultimately failed construction project of Iron Gates III, after which, in 1990, his father moved the family to his native Bucharest, where Irimia, the oldest of three children, attended the Alexandru Ioan Cuza highschool in Titan, where he swiftly became acquainted with gang violence, while also gaining an interest in chemistry and geometry. He dropped out of college after the first semester when he realized it was keeping him back from a full-time musical career and focused on producing B.U.G. Mafia's second album.

== Music career ==
=== Before B.U.G. Mafia (1990–1992) ===
As Romania had been a communist country until late 1989, western music was banned by Nicolae Ceaușescu's regime and official releases of hip hop albums were virtually impossible to find on the Romanian music market. Tataee himself stated in an interview for CNN that he got acquainted with rap music after the political regime switch that occurred in Romania in 1989. As a more liberal political system replaced the totalitarian rule of communism, heavy bootlegging of American music occurred on the Eastern European market. Inspired by Public Enemy and N.W.A, Tataee tried steering his professional options towards becoming a rapper and started working on his own music. By 1993, when he met his first collaborator, Daddy Caddy, he had only recorded one song and had little professional perspective. The official press release for B.U.G. Mafia states that they first met in late 1993 and recorded their first track together in 1994.

=== B.U.G. Mafia (1993–Present) ===
"După blocuri"
from După blocuri

B.U.G. recorded more tracks in English, producing their own beats with help from Romeo Vanica, a well known producer, who had a professional keyboard. In 1994, they had their first live appearance in one of the first Romanian hip hop shows, made possible by Bogdan "DJ Sleek" Untea, a famous Romanian hip-hop DJ and one of the first Romanians to pursue this career. Still looking for new rappers they met with Demonii ("The Demons"), one of the few Romanian hip-hop crews to rap in Romanian at the time. One of the members was Alin Demeter, also known as drama Drama then, later as Uzzi, who joined the group in 1995 and at the same time they changed their name adding Mafia so the Romanian public would get better acquainted with their style. They also stopped writing lyrics in English and switched to Romanian for the same reason. In the summer of 1995 they signed their first professional music contract to record an album with Amma Sound.

=== Move to Casa Productions (2001–2003) ===
"Băieți De Cartier"
from Băieți De Cartier

In 1997, Tataee provided vocals and produced several tracks on La Familia's debut album, Băieți De Cartier (Hoodboys), paving the group's way to hip hop superstardom in Romania and remaining a frequent collaborator until the feud that occurred between them in 2003. Later, in 1998, he produced XXL&10 Grei's whole debut album, Personajul Negativ (The Bad Guy) and although the album sold poorly, it was met with unanimous positive reviews by music critics and fans as well, establishing Grasu XXL and his collaborator, Paco "10 Grei" as two of the most prominent figures in Romanian hip hop. The B.U.G. Mafia Prezintă Casa (B.U.G. Mafia Presents Casa) album, released February 20, 2002, featured songs by his group, B.U.G. Mafia, as well as by newly signed Casa artists and the single Cine E Cu Noi (Who's With Us), intended as a new milestone in Romanian hip hop.

=== Move to Legend Audio (2004–2005) ===
"Stai (Ești În Pericol)"
from Orice E Posibil

JerryCo, a Romanian rapper had released two independent albums while still part of Agresiv, the well-known Romanian producing duo. JerryCo met Tataee in 2004, as the latter heard a demo containing some songs and called him to discuss a record contract. It was only a year after this meeting occurred that JerryCo actually signed with the label, after making significant progress on his own, enough to impress Tataee and determine him to finally start the Legend Audio project.

=== Focus on production (2003–Present) ===
Besides overseeing the production for every B.U.G. Mafia album, Tataee proved to have a strong interest for work as a music producer since the late-90s, helping launch careers for acclaimed acts such as La Familia, XXL & 10 Grei or Mahsat, to name a few. Following the success of Băieții Buni, Tataee focused on producing songs and albums for other artists. In 2004, he produced the third album for raggamuffin Bucharest-based group M&G, also providing vocals for the album's lead single, "Asalt Raggafonic" (Raggaphonic Assault). Tataee's work on the album earned them an MTV Romanian Music Awards nomination in 2005, in the "Best New Act" category. He produced Bitză's "Urmatorul Pas" (The Next Step), the first single from his debut album, "Sevraj" (Withdrawal). The track proved to be a great success, launching Bitză's career while providing significant record sales. He also worked with Romanian pop group Akcent, producing and writing their 2004 single "Poveste De Viață" (Life Story).

He produced and provided vocals for the single "Fără Egal" (Like No One Else) by R&B singer Cristina Spătar. In 2007, he produced the lead single of pop singer Adriana Rusu's debut album, "Sentimente" (Feelings), a track called "Noi Doi" (Us Two) on which he also performed two of the song's verses. He worked with Andreea Antonescu, formerly of the pop group André to produce her 2008 single "Ridica Mâinile" (Raise Your Hands). In 2006, together with bandmate Daddy Caddy, Tataee served as the executive producer of Grasu XXL's debut solo album, "Curaj" (Courage) and while he had virtually no contribution to the musical production, he helped create an album that would spawn one of the most successful singles in the Romanian hip hop industry, "Fără Filtru" (Without Filters), also appearing in the song's music video. Although in 2009 he produced and released the second volume of B.U.G. Mafia's anniversary album, he has been generally hard to spot in the Romanian media outside a handful of interviews promoting the album's release and his Twitter page where he constantly interacts with his fans. In 2009 he also worked with Romanian hip hop female artist Marijuana to produce a track on her untitled 2010 second album.

== Personal life ==
=== Relationships and family ===
Irimia has been in a stable relationship with his girlfriend for several years and is currently planning to get married sometime in the future. His first child, Antonia Olga, was born in early 2011. He also has an older brother and a younger sister who also live in Bucharest. Over the time he has jokingly stated in various interviews that his parents were not thrilled with the job he chose but that ultimately they have grown to be proud. For many years, he was also an avid supporter of Dinamo București.

=== Car accident ===
On the night of August 9, 2008, while driving from a B.U.G. Mafia concert from Periam to Lipova, Irimia tried to go around another vehicle and collided with a scooter, seriously injuring the man driving it. Police investigations concluded that Irimia did not take the necessary measures before overtaking the vehicle in front of him and, as the victim was rushed to the hospital with both legs and a few ribs broken, his driver's license was suspended for three months and a criminal record was issued against him. The conclusions of the investigations were that, had the man driving the scooter not been wearing a helmet, he would have probably been killed in the accident, making Irimia liable for serious jail time. He went on to give details of an early 2008 incident when, driving from another concert, a truck lost control on the road passing their car by very closely. He turned a hard right and the fact that they crashed on the side of the road was actually what saved them from being seriously injured or even killed from colliding with the runaway truck.

== Musical influences and style ==
Tataee has said that he uses multiple instruments while working in the studio, preferring to use virtual instruments and the computer to arrange and produce his instrumentals. His Twitter official page features various conversations with inquiring fans, with Irimia stating that he prefers virtual instrument manufacturers such as Native Instruments and Steinberg. He cites Dr. Dre and Public Enemy's Bomb Squad as his primary musical influences. During the time he answered fan questions on the bugmafia93.ro message board, he used Steinberg Cubase to sequence and mix his beats, but he has since switched to ProTools HD.

In the mid 90s Tataee started collaborating with Camil Beldeanu, a Romanian keyboardist who had worked with various Romanian artists and who went on to be one of the most prominent producers and arrangers to work with Romanian hip hop artists in the late 90s and early 2000s.

=== Writing ===
He wrote the lyrics for the 2004 Akcent single "Poveste De Viață" (Life Story) and he also wrote Cristina Spătar's 2006 "Fără Egal" single (Like No One Else) and Adriana Rusu's "Noi Doi" (Us). fails NFCC

== Discography ==
With B.U.G. Mafia

=== Studio albums ===
- Mafia ("The Mafia") – 1995
- Născut și crescut în Pantelimon ("Born And Raised In Pantelimon") – 1996
- IV: Deasupra tuturor ("IV: Above All") – 1997
- De Cartier ("From The Hood") – 1998
- După blocuri ("In The Projects") – 2000
- Întotdeauna pentru totdeauna ("Always Forever") – 2000
- Băieții Buni ("The Goodfellas") – 2003
- Înapoi În Viitor ("Back To The Future") – 2011

=== Extended plays ===
- Înc-o zi, înc-o poveste ("Another Day, Another Story") – 1996

=== Maxi-singles ===
- Hoteluri ("Hotels") – 1997
- Pentru '98 (For '98) – 1998
- Lumea e a mea (The World Is Mine) – 1998 (Loredana Groza feat. B.U.G. Mafia)
- România (Romania) – 1999
- Un 2 și 3 de 0 (A 2 Followed by 3 Zeros) – 2000
- Poezie de stradă (Street Poetry) – 2001
- Străzile (The Streets) – 2005

=== Compilations ===
- B.U.G. Mafia prezintă CASA ("B.U.G. Mafia Presents 'CASA'") – 2002

=== Best-Of Albums ===
- Viața noastră Vol.1 ("Our Life Vol. 1") – 2006
- Viața noastră Vol.2 ("Our Life Vol. 2") – 2009
- Viața noastră (Deluxe Edition) (Our Life Deluxe Edition) – 2009
