= B.U.G. Mafia =

Romanian hip hop group

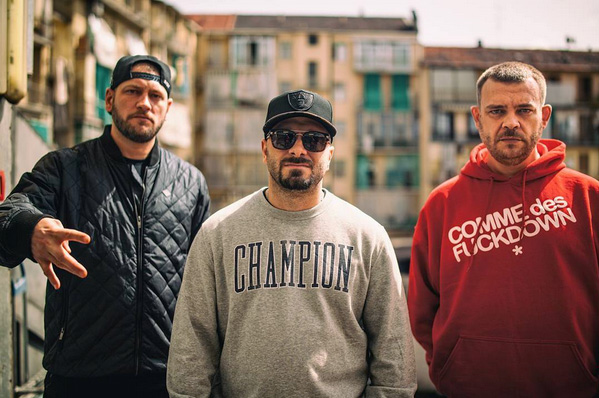
- From left to right: Cadillac, Uzzi, Tataee

Background information
- Origin: Pantelimon, Bucharest, Romania
- Genres: Hip hop; gangsta rap; hardcore hip hop; G-funk; underground rap
- Years active: 1993–present
- Labels: AMMA Record; Cat Music; Media Services; Casa Productions
- Members: Tataee; Cadillac; Uzzi
- Past members: D.D.; Mr.Nobody; DJ Swamp
- Website: bugmafiaoficial.ro

B.U.G. Mafia (an abbreviation for "Bucharest Underground Mafia"), is a Romanian hip hop group from Pantelimon, Bucharest, widely regarded as one of the seminal acts of gangsta rap in Romania. Founded in 1993 as Black Underground, its original lineup consisted of Vlad "Tataee" Irimia, Dragoș "Caddy" (short for Cadillac) Vlad-Neagu and two other members, D.D. and Mr.Nobody, who, by the end of the year, had already departed from the group. Irimia and Vlad-Neagu, who were still teenage high school students at the time, had been working on amateur solo recordings and had little professional prospects on their own prior to their encounter. The group initially performed as a duo throughout Bucharest at local highschool proms and parties while considering their options for professional careers in music and, following a string of relatively unsuccessful attempts at promoting their music in English, they recruited Alin "Uzzi" Demeter in 1995 and eventually transitioned to writing in Romanian.

Throughout the years, the group endured a long-standing controversy due to the explicit and confrontational nature of their lyrics. Focusing on subjects such as the post-communist Romanian political class, poverty and crime in Romania's communist-built housing projects or their recurring hostility towards Romanian Police, they were subsequently banned from many mainstream T.V. and radio stations in Romania and even at times prevented from touring, spending a night in police custody after their first concert in Drobeta-Turnu Severin in 1997. Although controversial in their incipient years, their lyricism has been praised by a number of literary figures, such as Emil Brumaru and Mircea Cărtărescu.

Despite being independently produced on a modest budget over just a few months in 1995, their debut album Mafia signified the birth of Romanian gangsta rap and established them on the fledgling hip hop scene emerging at the time in Romania. They have been estimated to have sold over 1,150,000 records.

They are widely regarded as the pioneers of the gangsta rap scene in Europe, being the first major group to fuse the raw, West Coast-inspired sound of 90s gangsta rap with the social and political struggles of post-communist Romania, shaping the foundation of Romanian rap.

== History ==
=== Formation and early years (1992–1995) ===
The group was founded in late 1993 when Pantelimon-based producer Vlad "Tataee" Irimia met Dragoș "Caddy" Vlad-Neagu in Bucharest. Tataee, who was still in highschool, had been interested in becoming a professional musician since 1992, when, under the stage name Doom, he had produced an independent demo called "Straight Outta da Hell", stirring Caddillac's interest, as he was also an amateur recording artist working under the name MC La Duc and had recorded a track titled "Apocalipse" on his own earlier in 1993. As Romania had just overthrown its communist regime in the Romanian Revolution of 1989, western goods such as bootleg recordings of rap albums had started to flood the market in the market liberalization process that had begun. As Irimia and Vlad-Neagu learned that their musical tastes coincided, they decided on pursuing their careers as a group which they named Black Underground and abbreviated it to B.U.G. in late 1993. Two friends of Irimia and Vlad-Neagu, D.D. and Mr.Nobody also joined later but, due to a lack of interest and involvement, quit in early 1994, before the group recorded any songs. In March 1994, Irimia and Vlad-Neagu, working under the stage names Doom and Klax 187 respectively, reworked Irimia's demo recording into their debut single. Working at the Uniplus Radio studios in Bucharest, the two decided to keep the title "Straight Outta da Hell" and recorded the song with Florin "DJ Sensei" Cojocaru, an electronic musician and DJ who produced the record. "Straight Outta da Hell" premiered a month later on Uniplus Radio during "YO! Rap is Moving." a hip-hop oriented late night program hosted by Adrian Niculescu, a local radio personality and DJ. Shortly following their radio debut, Tataee and Caddillac managed to book their first live appearance during a local hip hop concert in Bucharest, an experience they would both later remember as unpleasant, but also significantly influential in their choice of pursuing careers as professional musicians.

Since hip hop was just emerging as a music genre in Romania in the early 1990s, studio time and stage performance opportunities were relatively limited, so the group had to rely on the restricted prospects that presented themselves to record more songs. They began working with Romeo Vanica, a keyboardist who had been a member of the Romanian rock group Mondial, who agreed to allow them to use his studio equipment for music production in 1994 as they started creating more songs for an English debut album, tentatively titled Breakin' da Law. While involved in the production process, Irimia and Vlad-Neagu also became interested in music management and consequently started exploring the local rap scene for other groups or solo artists to associate with in order to include a more diverse variety of artists on the album. In December 1994, they met Alin Demeter, who at the time performed under the stage name Drama and was a member of Demonii (The Demons), one of the few local rap acts who performed in Romanian. Initially, B.U.G. invited both members of the group to enroll in the newly founded crew and, throughout the first half of 1995, Demonii became involved in a number of local live performances with Black Underground in Bucharest. Following Demeter's bandmate's decision to form another group besides Demonii, the two parted ways and Demeter joined Black Underground in May 1995. After the settlement, Irimia, Vlad-Neagu and Demeter decided to scrap the recordings they had worked on and switch to performing and writing in Romanian in order to gain access to a larger potential fanbase in their native Romania.

=== Mafia (1995–1996) ===
The group released Mafia in late 1995 and, since music distribution was virtually nonexistent in Romania at the time, the album was only available for a relatively short period of time in Bucharest, becoming valuable fan memorabilia over time. The album, recorded by Holograf keyboardist and producer Antonio "Tino" Furtună, contained 15 tracks, including collaborations with Pantelimon-based group M&G, hip hop female artist Marijuana and Romanian actress Rona Hartner. Even though their lyrical abilities have refined over the time, the group reflected the rising anger of the urban youth detailing aspects such as urban violence or the rising poverty of the Romanian working class in post-communist Romania in their debut work. With songs such as "Viață De Borfaș" (Thug Life), "Ucigaș" (Killer) or "Înc-o Cruce-n Cimitir" (Another Cross In The Cemetery) they painted their worldview as inner-city youths.

Despite the album's poor sound quality and virtually inexistent label promotion, it created enough controversy around the group to allow them get signed by Cat Music, one of the largest Romanian record labels, paving their way to national superstardom. Mafia is frequently quoted among Romanian hip hop historians as the third hip hop album to be released in Romania, after R.A.C.L.A.'s Rap-Sodia efectului defectului (Rap-sody For The Flaw's Effect) and Paraziții's Poezii pentru pereți (Poetry For The Walls).

=== Cat Music and national exposure (1996–1997) ===
After releasing their debut album, controversy surrounded the group regarding recurring use of violent and sexual lyrics and profanity. The situation created a buzz around them that sparked the interest of Alin Brașov, a Romanian American lawyer who had just returned to Romania and was one of the four associates who owned Cat Music, one of the first professional record labels, which also was the local branch of Sony Records. Brașov, having heard about the impressive success N.W.A had in the United States, convinced the other three associates, Emanuel Maxwell, Sorin Golea and Dan Popi to give the group a chance. B.U.G. Mafia were subsequently signed by Cat Music and released their second studio material, the Înc-o zi, înc-o poveste (Another Day, Another Story) EP. It sparked the group's first hit single, "Pantelimonu' Petrece" (Pantelimon's Having A Party), a feature with young pop singer Iuliana "July" Petrache. Tataee referenced this moment in a 2009 interview with Radio ZU talk show-host Mihai Morar, mentioning that the song became a hit just after Romania adopted a new copyright law, enabling the group to make significant profits, as B.U.G. Mafia were one of the few Romanian groups that received radio airplay in the mid 90s. He also mentioned on his official Twitter page that Mircea Badea was the first TV host to have the group on the air in 1996, during the morning show he presented at Tele 7 abc with Teo Trandafir. "Pantelimonu' Petrece" was so successful that the group was actually in talks with the TV station to produce a music video for the song, but the idea eventually fell through.

One hit single wasn't enough for B.U.G. Mafia and they released their third studio material and second full-length album the same year. Născut și crescut în Pantelimon (Born And Raised In Pantelimon), an homage to the neighbourhood where Tataee, Uzzi and Caddillac grew up, sparked hit singles "Până când moartea ne va despărți" (Until Death Do Us Part), which is also Puya's studio debut and "Născut și crescut în Pantelimon" (Born And Raised In Pantelimon). The album included notable guests such as Don Baxter and DJ Freakadadisk, members of Romanian group Morometzii at the time, who would go on to become two of the most notable figures in Romanian hip hop.

"Hoteluri"
from IV: Deasupra tuturor

=== Controversy and superstardom years (1997–2000) ===
==== Arrest and IV: Deasupra tuturor ====
As Cat Music had grown into a fully professional record label, the group started to get noticed by the Romanian media. In early 1997, Tataee, Caddilac and Uzzi, together with La Familia members Tudor Sișu and Dragoș "Puya" Gardescu, were taken into police custody after a concert in Turnu Severin. As Romania was still a fairly conservative country in the mid-90s, the Romanian penal code forbad the use of profanity in public places. Refusing to take into account that the violent lyrics were not actually performed in a public place, the Romanian Police forces arrested the five artists, charging them with outrage against good customs. They were eventually released after 10 hours of giving statements at the police station and district attorney's office in Turnu Severin. The Romanian media brought the case to national fame and, much like the FBI drawing publicity to N.W.A in the early 90s, the case was the starting point of a media frenzy that would last for over two years and bring a lot of unexpected fame for both B.U.G. Mafia and La Familia.

Over the summer, the group continued studio work on its fourth album, IV: Deasupra tuturor (IV:Above Everybody). Group producer Tataee had just started collaborating with Eddy "DJ Phantom" Schneider, one of the most known Romanian composers in the 1990s, who helped refine the g-funk sound the group was trying to achieve at the time. The legal incident that had occurred in February reflected in the album's sales, as it moved an impressive 55,000 units with no music video or radio single promoting it. It was the first B.U.G. Mafia album to be released on both cassette tape and CD.

==== De cartier and national fame ====
The group released the first single from its fifth studio album, "Pentru '98" (For '98) in June 1998. Although commercial sounding and easygoing, the track was met with reluctance by both radio stations and fans alike. A music video was shot by the then newly formed Atomic TV music channel, but the result was disappointing for the group's members and management and thus the video was never released. An unexpected success came from the single's b-side, a song entitled "N-ai fost acolo" (You weren't there), a viral response to critics claiming that the group's lyrics were pure fiction and had no factual basis whatsoever, became a massive hit during the summer and provided a strong launch pad for the album's release in September 1998. De Cartier (From The Hood) was B.U.G. Mafia's best selling album, moving over 125,000 copies and catapulting the group to national superstardom. The album's success attracted pop icon Loredana Groza's interest for a collaboration. The resulting song, "Lumea e a mea" (The world is mine) was released as a single in late 1998 and became an instant hit in Romania. The success prompted the making of a music video, which was the first Romanian hip hop video ever made. B.U.G. Mafia continued to work throughout 1999 and, after the impressive success one of their concerts in Bucharest had, they were invited by TV host Mihai Tatulici to talk about their work and history in a special edition of his talk show. The exposure they got reflected in the sales of their sixth studio effort, După blocuri, which was released in early 2000 by Cat Music. Accompanied by the group's first official music video, the album is often categorized as their darkest work to this day. Influenced by the massive discreditation campaign started by the Romanian media after the success of 1998's De cartier, the album was very liberal and experimental with production and songwriting techniques for its time in Romanian music. The group's notoriety also prompted some inmates incarcerated at the Rahova State Penitentiary in Bucharest to request a B.U.G. Mafia concert. The live performance took place in mid-2000 and is frequently mentioned by Tataee, Caddilac and Uzzi as a very special and meaningful moment in the group's history.

Întotdeauna pentru totdeauna (Always Forever) was released in late 2000, making it their second album in the same year. Supported by the "Un 2 şi trei de 0" (A two followed by three zeroes) single, it brought singer-songwriter Vilmos "Villy" Kanalas to national fame, making him one of the most well known B.U.G. Mafia collaborators over time. The album was also known in Romania for its inclusion of the "Poezie de stradă" (Street Poetry) song which was released as a single in 2001 and had a music video that featured real Romanian Police officers crashing an organized crime meeting.

=== Casa Productions ===
"Cine E Cu Noi"
from B.U.G. Mafia prezintă CASA

The group had been interested in founding a record label since the late 1990s so they could obtain more creative control in producing their own music and also sign and develop new artists. The paperwork was finalized in 2001 and the newly formed Casa Productions entered the Romanian music market a year later, when the group released the B.U.G. Mafia prezinta CASA (B.U.G. Mafia presents: Casa) compilation album to introduce the label's new artists to the world. Hip hop heavyweights M&G and XXL & 10 Grei as well as newcomers Mahsat, Anturaj and Luchian were amongst the label's new signees in 2002. Gangsta rap pioneers La Familia were also interested in joining Casa Productions but a disagreement with the label's management led to a conflict that took both groups to court a couple of years later. The album sold over 100,000 copies and has remained one of the best-selling compilation albums released in Romania. Mahsat were the first act to release their album under Casa Productions in late 2002. A commercial failure, it sold just over 1,000 units and it led to the group's disbanding and the release from their contract in 2004. Aside from Casa Productions, each group member founded his own label for personal projects. Rapper Mihai "JerryCo" Dumitrescu released his debut album in 2010 under Tataee's label, Legend Audio.

==== DJ Swamp (2003–2008) ====
B.U.G. Mafia at Club Dumars in Bucharest in 2003 at the Băieții Buni (The Goodfellas) release party.

Nicolae "DJ Swamp" Oncescu had been a full-time member of hip hop group R.A.C.L.A. for over a year when he decided to join B.U.G. Mafia after a few live appearances with them in 2002. Oncescu quit R.A.C.L.A. shortly after and became a full-time member of B.U.G. Mafia and a staff producer for Casa Productions. Tataee had stated in various interviews that he had been interested in adding a professional DJ to the group since the early 90s but the few hip hop DJs in Romania were already committed to other projects. Petre "Freakadadisk" Urda, who had collaborated with the group on their 1996 album, Născut și crescut în Pantelimon (Born and raised in Pantelimon), had been a full-time member of Morometzii before joining Romanian hip hop pioneers Paraziții in 1998 and DJ Dox was also working with R.A.C.L.A. at the time. Oncescu parted ways with the group in 2008 citing creative differences and stated that he remained in good terms with them. However, group producer Tataee repeatedly mentioned that the break up had not been a friendly one and that he had not maintained any connection to DJ Swamp. Oncescu has since changed his professional name to Nicalai and has pursued a career as an electronic music artist, releasing his debut album A.E.R. - Asta E Romania (T.I.R. - This Is Romania) in 2009. In a 2011 interview, Oncescu claimed that the reason he parted ways with Mafia was a financial misunderstanding.

==== The Goodfellas (2003) ====
Băieții Buni (The Goodfellas), the eight studio album, was a milestone for several firsts in the group's history. It was their first album to be released under the then newly formed Casa Productions label, as well as it was their first album to be recorded at Ines Sound & Video, in Bucharest, at the time Romania's most high end recording studio. Group producer Tataee employed several new production techniques and this was reflected in the overall sound of the album, as well as in the way it was received by its fans and critics. With 22 tracks, it was B.U.G. Mafia's most lengthy album, also the first in the group's history not to have any female guest performers. The follow-up to Băieții Buni was only released in 2011 as the group embarked in a 6-year-long journey producing and recording two greatest hits albums in the first decade of the 21st century.

=== Greatest Hits Era (2003–2009) ===
Starting in late 2003, the group started work on a greatest hits album that was to take them just under 6 years to complete. Tataee wanted the group to re-record the vocals for every song that was to be included on the album, while he produced new beats for the updated versions of the tracks. Titled Viața Noastră (Our Life), recording sessions for the album started in 2003 at the Ines Sound and Video studios in Bucharest and carried on throughout 2004 before being halted so the group could work on the Băieți buni (Good Guys) soundtrack.

==== Our Life Vol.1 (2003–2006) ====
The album was released in mid-2006 by Cat Music and Casa Productions after multiple delays. The first single was the title track "Viața Noastră" (Our Life). Using a sample from Casa Productions artist Villy's 2002 "O Altă Zi" (Just Another Day) song, it was released in early 2006 along with a music video shot by Marius Panduru and directed by Marian Crișan. The album included 14 hit records of the group, all of which had been completely re-recorded and featured an updated sound. As "Pantelimonu' Petrece" (Pantelimon's Having A Party) had been one of their first signature hit-songs, the record was released as a single in mid-2006, with a music video also directed by Marian Crișan. Pop singer Adriana Vlad was hired to record all the female-vocal parts. The album sold over 40,000 copies and was certified gold in Romania.

"În Anii Ce-au Trecut"
from Viața noastră (Vol.2)

==== Străzile and film work (2004–2005) ====
In 2004, the group was approached by Pro TV to compose and produce the soundtrack for Andrei Boncea's procedural drama, Băieți buni (Good Guys). The resulting track, "Străzile" (The Streets) was released as a single in 2005 along with a music video directed by Andreea Păduraru and shot by Tudor Lucaciu. The recording sessions interrupted the group's work on their greatest hits album, so its release had to be further delayed until early 2006.

==== Our Life Vol.2 (2005–2009) ====
Recording sessions for the second part of the group's greatest hits album started in 2005, again at the Ines Sound & Video studios in Bucharest. The only song that was released from the 2005 sessions was on the Băieți buni-soundtrack single Străzile (The Streets). The album was initially planned to be released in late 2007 but Ines changed their location, upgrading their recording technology, making group producer Tataee to insist for a re-do of the whole album in the new studio. Various other obstacles pushed the release even further into late 2009. Viața noastră (Vol.2) (Our Life Vol.2) was B.U.G. Mafia's last release on Cat Music, their home label for over 14 years, as the group went independent from 2010.

=== Internet Era (2009–present) ===
A series of notable changes occurred after the release of the second volume of the "Viața Noastră" (Our Life) best-of series. The group left Cat Music, the record company that had catapulted them to superstardom 14 years earlier, which had been their distribution company since they had made the switch to Casa Productions in late 2001. Group producer Tataee mentioned that the group would employ a new approach to music since the Internet had played a crucial role in the demise of the compact disc-era in the musical industry.

== Members ==
- Tataee (1993–present)
- Caddillac (1993–present)
- D.D. (1993)
- Mr.Nobody (1993)
- Uzzi (1995–present)
- DJ Swamp (2002–2008)

Lineup chronology

== Discography ==
=== Studio albums ===
In a career that spans over 20 years of activity, the group has released over 20 singles, 8 studio albums, one extended play, one compilation album and two greatest hits albums.

- Mafia (Mafia) - 1995
- Născut și crescut în Pantelimon (Born and Raised in Pantelimon) - 1996
- IV: Deasupra tuturor (IV: Above Everyone) - 1997
- De Cartier (Of The Hood) - 1998
- După blocuri (Behind The Buildings) - 2000
- Întotdeauna pentru totdeauna (Always and Forever) - 2000
- Băieții Buni (The Goodfellas) - 2003
- Înapoi În Viitor (Back In the Future) - 2011

=== Extended plays ===
- Înc-o zi, înc-o poveste (Another Day, Another Story) - 1996

=== Compilations ===
- B.U.G. Mafia prezintă CASA (B.U.G. Mafia Presents 'CASA') - 2002

=== Greatest hits albums ===
- Viața noastră Vol.1 (Our Life Vol. 1) - 2006
- Viața noastră Vol.2 (Our Life Vol. 2) - 2009
- Viața noastră (Deluxe Edition) (Our Life Deluxe Edition) - 2009
