= Pantelimon, Bucharest =

Neighbourhood in Bucharest, Romania

Coordinates: 44°26′33.48″N 26°9′32.83″E

Pantelimon on the map of Bucharest

Pantelimon is a neighbourhood located in north-eastern Bucharest, Romania, in Sector 2. Outside Bucharest, there is an adjacent town named Pantelimon, administered separately.

The Pantelimon district is named after Saint Pantaleon (Pantelimon in Romanian), and hosts Arena Națională, the largest football stadium in Romania. Pantelimon Avenue is the backbone of the district.

A Cora hypermarket is situated in this neighbourhood. Several car showrooms (Renault & Dacia, Peugeot, Skoda, Fiat) have been built in the east side of the district.

The area was a small houses neighborhood until systematisation started in 1971. The first apartment blocks were completed in 1974, followed by the completion of the "Delfinului" housing complex in 1976–1978, construction having continued until the 1980s, specifically west of the 23 August Stadium and on Chișinău Avenue. Most of the buildings constructed in the 1970s feature structures typically filled out with mortar, whilst some of them use prefabricated concrete panels. Ultimately, in the 1980s, the predominant construction technique was using prefabricated concrete panels, and most buildings of the same type can be seen one after the other, being "copy-pasted" in a typical fashion of the era.

A famous area of the district is "Capătu' lu' 14" (or "Capu' lu' 14", literally "the terminus of (tram) line 14"), which is situated in the east side of the neighbourhood, and features "Confort 2" block buildings with 4 stories. This area is the setting of a popular legend among locals, "The Children's Fall." The story — which dates back to the mid-1950s, when the area suffered from gangster and racketeering problems — details the supposed decline of the neighbourhood's children from being "legit" to being "dangerous". Pantelimon is also famous in Romania because of the hip-hop group B.U.G. Mafia. As children, the members of the band lived on Pantelimon Alley and Socului, near "Capătu' lu" 14". Tataee, a member of B.U.G. Mafia stated in various interviews that both he and Uzzi and Daddy Caddy still live in the neighbourhood.

The east side of the neighbourhood was built on the domains of the Mărcuța Monastery. The old Mărcuţa church built in 1587 still exists today on the banks of Pantelimon lake.

Pantelimon is served by the Pantelimon and Republica subway stations, as well as tram lines 14, 23, 36, 40, 55 and bus lines 101, 104, 243, 330, 335.

Currently, there are 5 primary and 2 secondary schools (Lucian Blaga Theoretical High School and Saint Pantaleon Industrial School Group) in the neighbourhood.

== Gallery ==
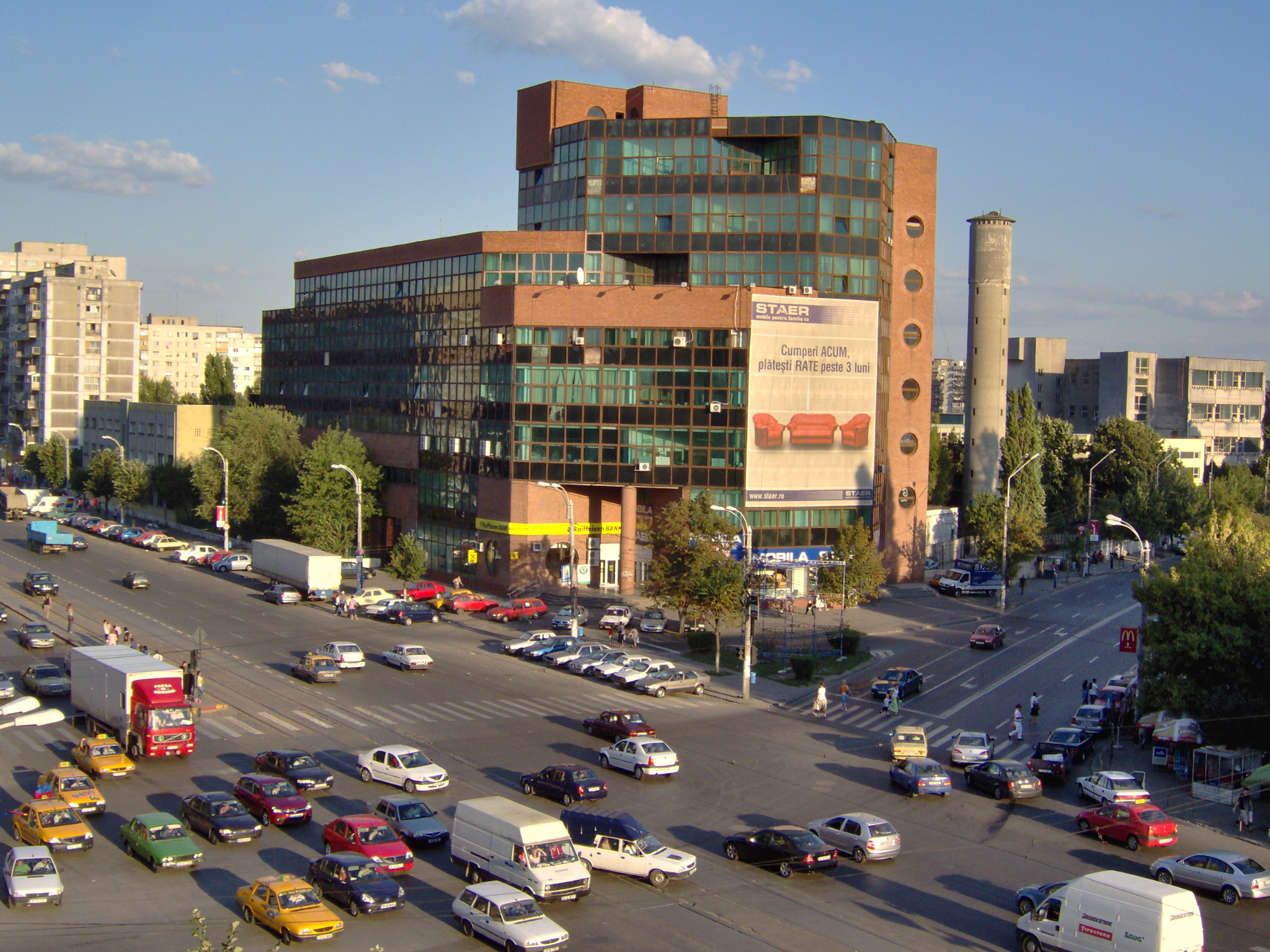
Postăvăria Româna building (1978-1979, by Zoltán Takács), August 2006

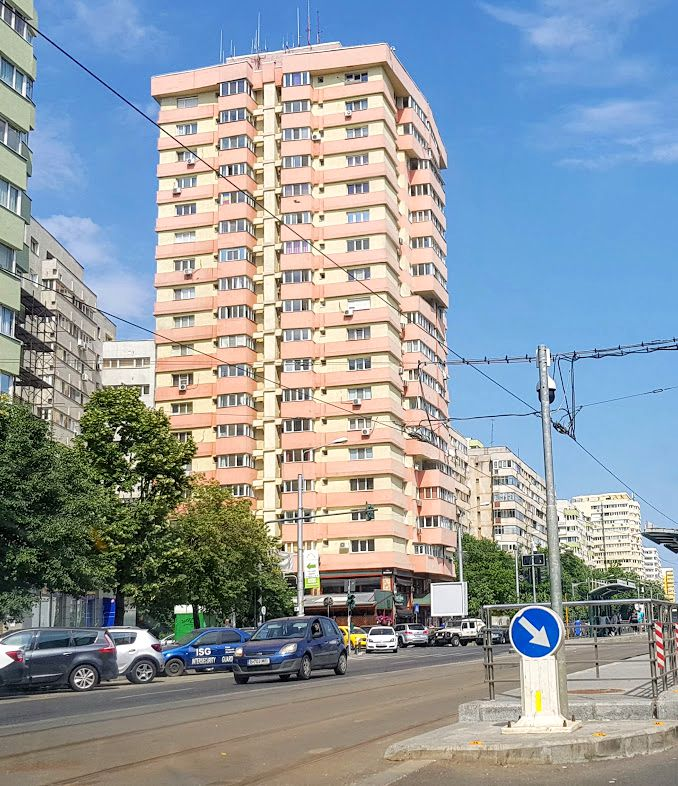
The T69 tower block, June 2018

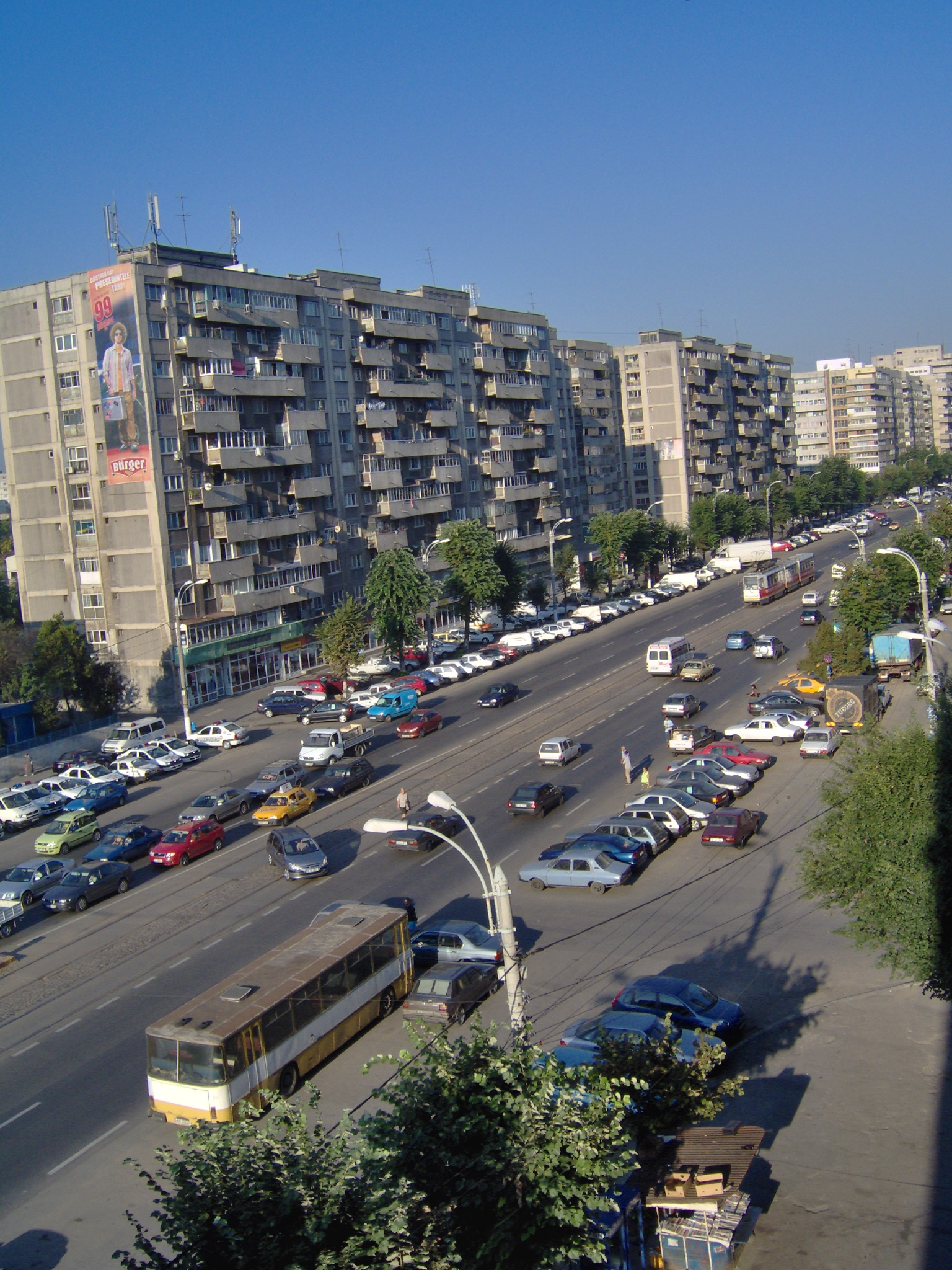
Apartment blocks in Pantelimon, August 2006

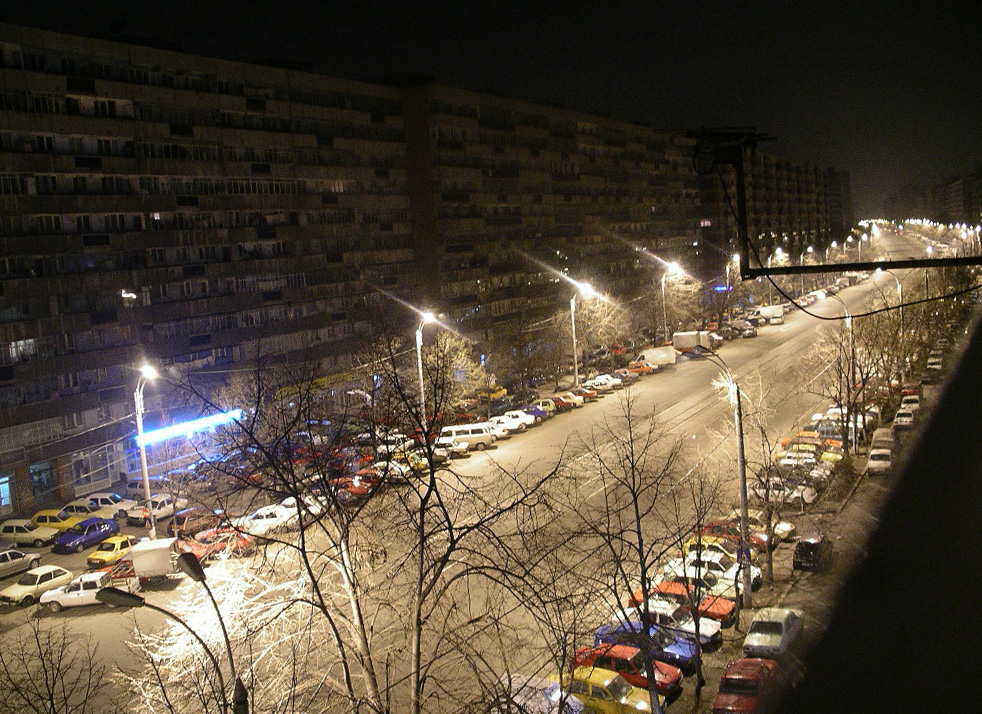
Pantelimon Avenue, during night time, with first apartment blocks from 1974

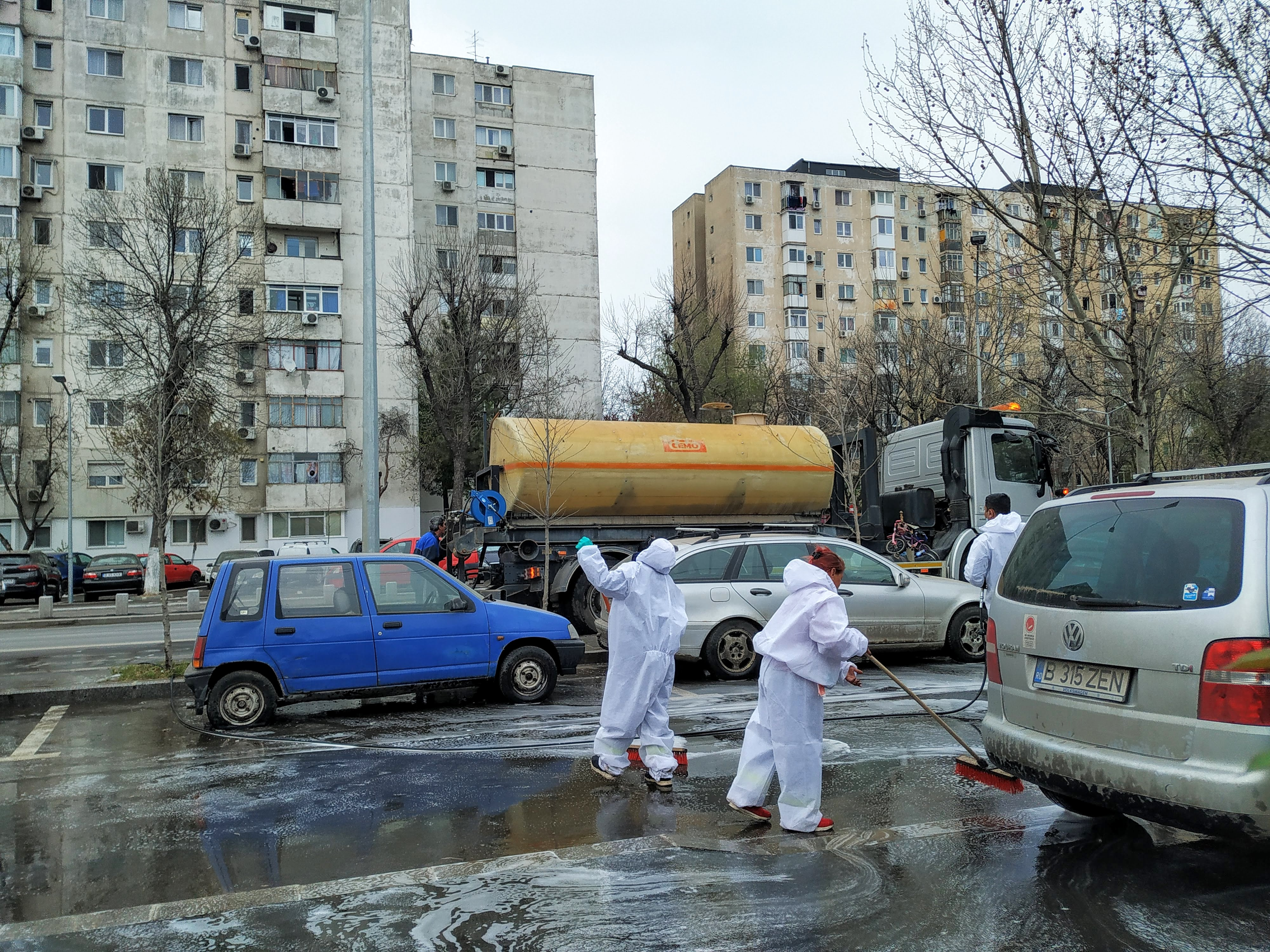
One of the alleys of the housing estate during the coronavirus pandemic in Romania, April 2020

=== Historical gallery ===
All images were taken in March 1976.

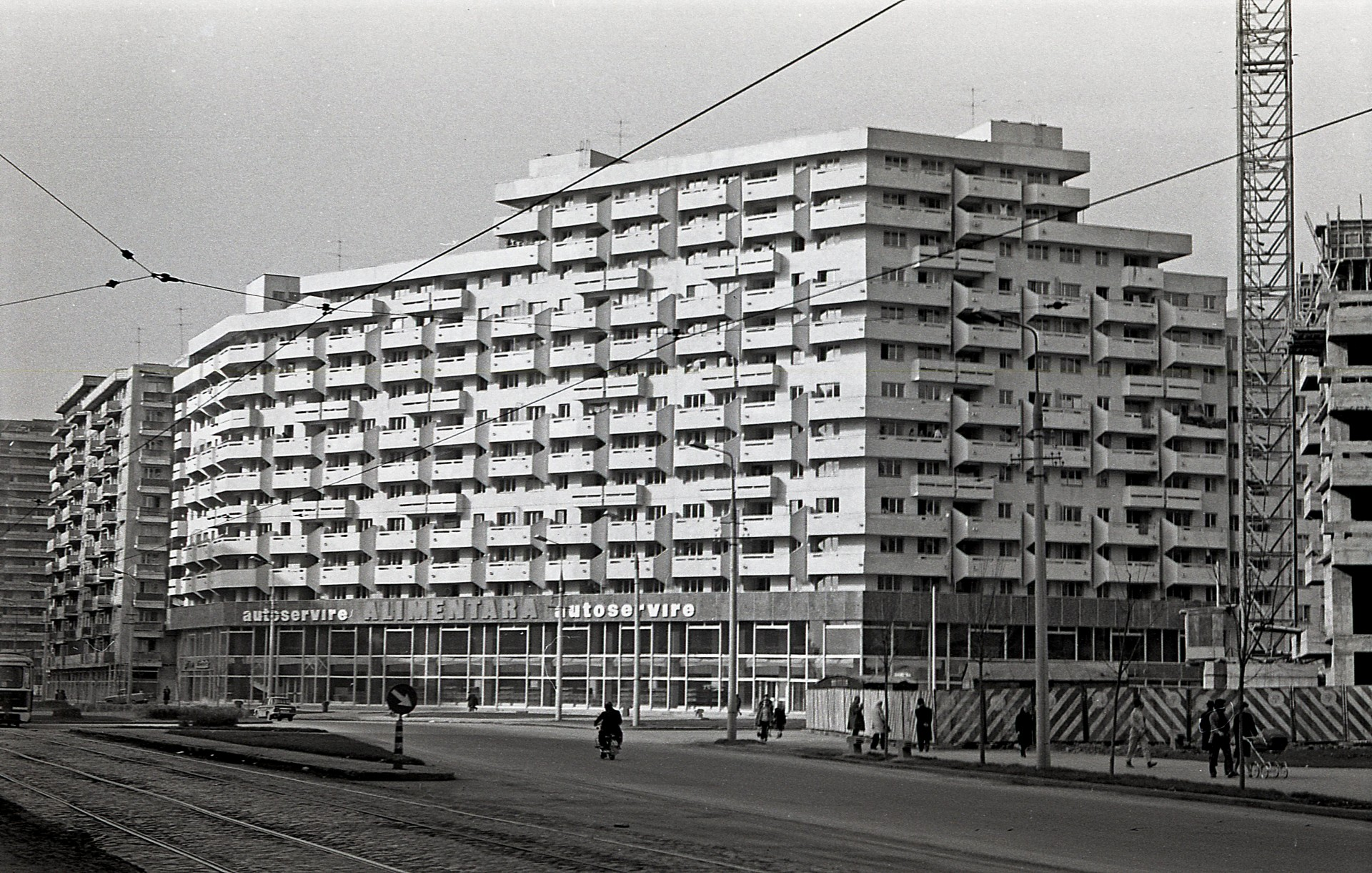
Delfinului housing complex

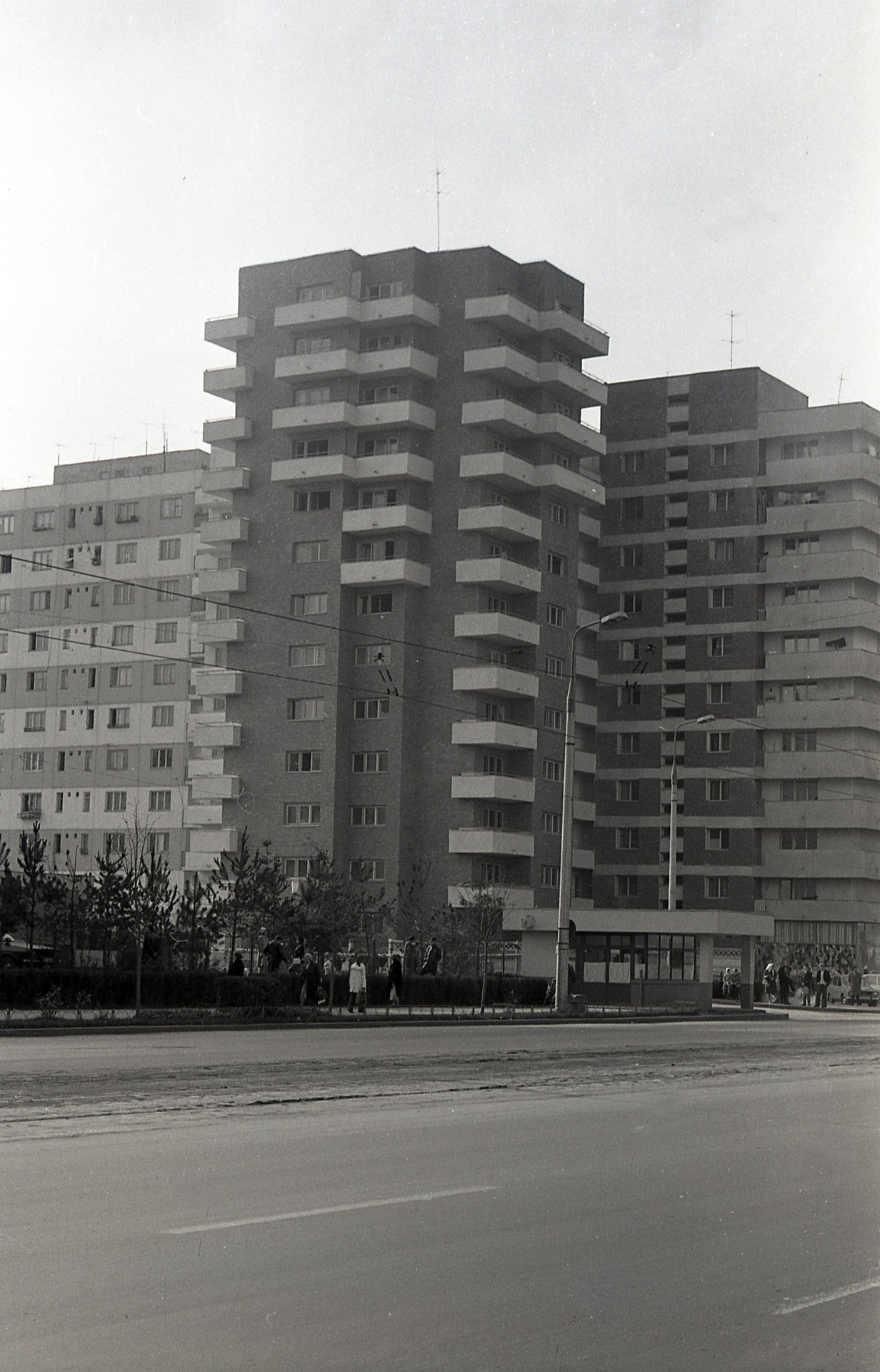
Block 5A

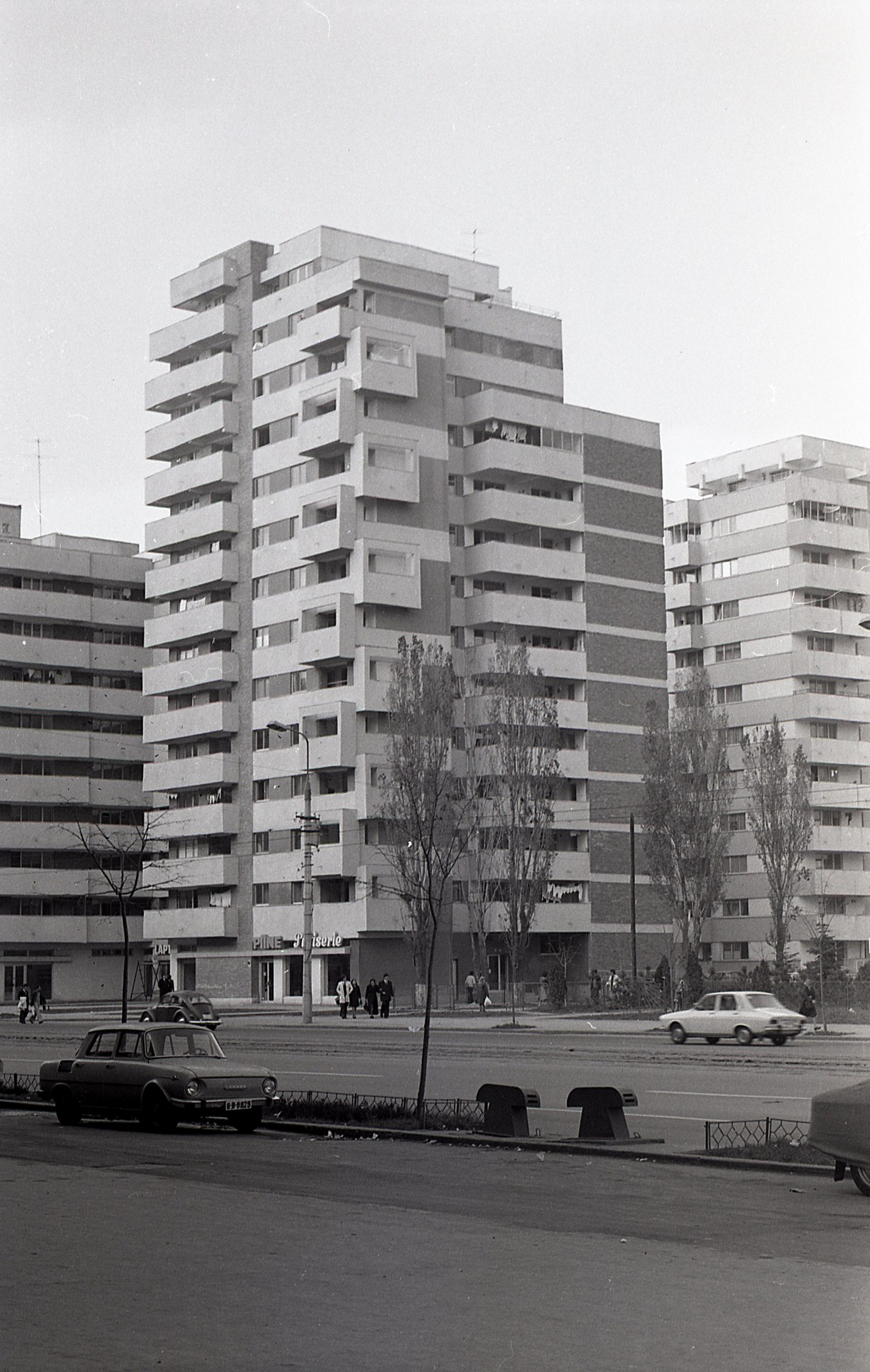
Block 7B

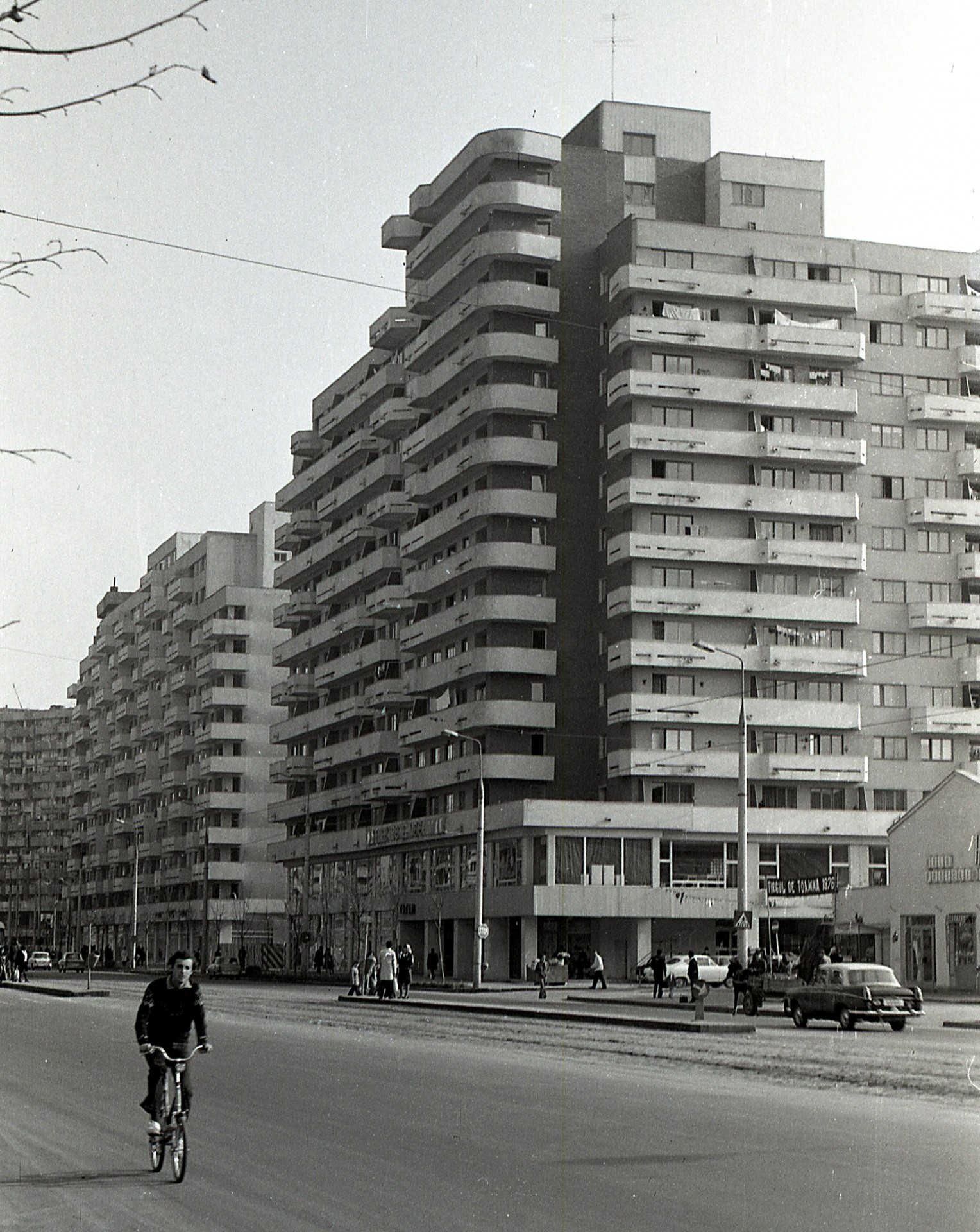
Block 59/60

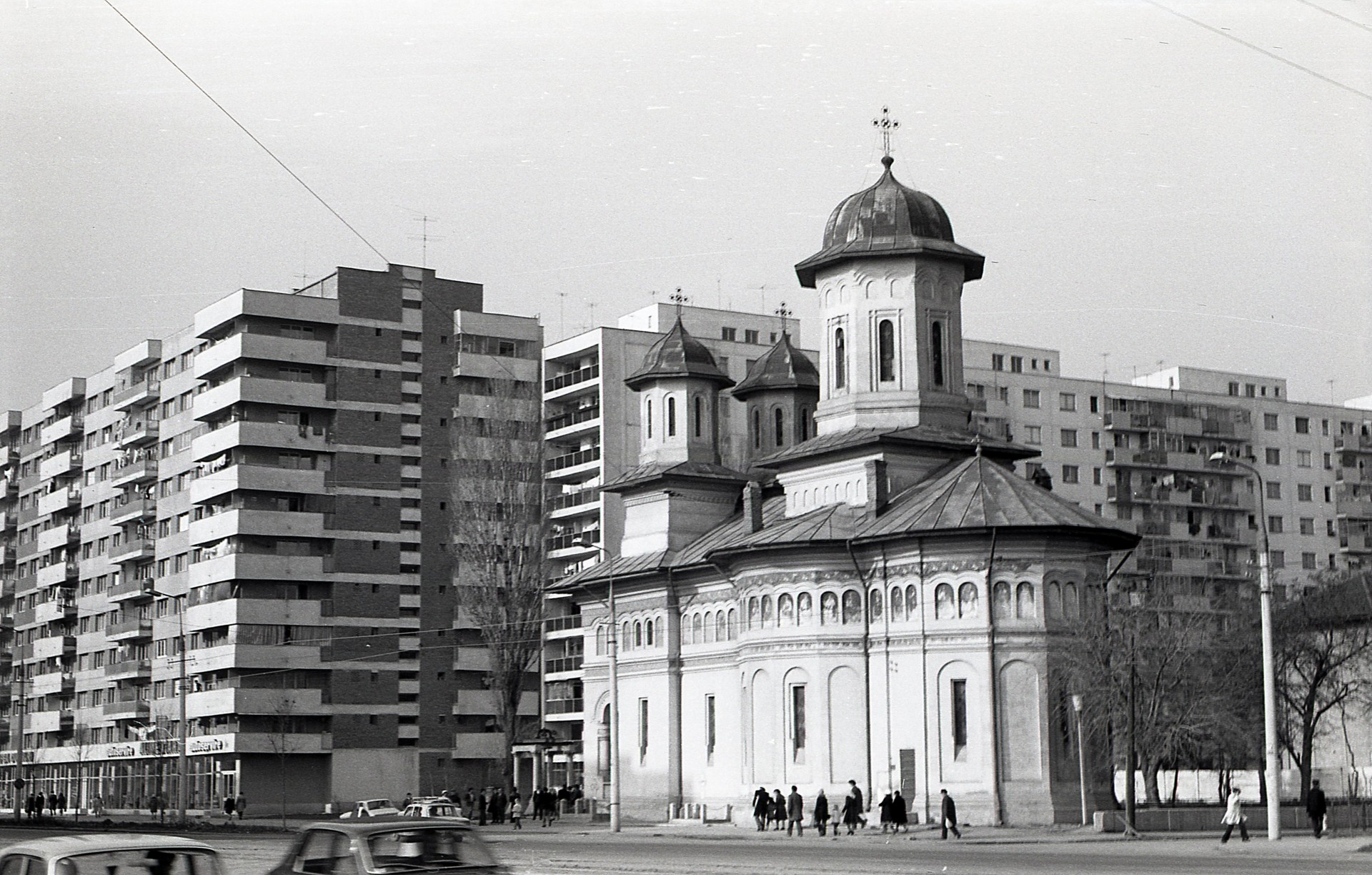
Saint John the Baptiser (Sfântul Ioan Botezătorul) church

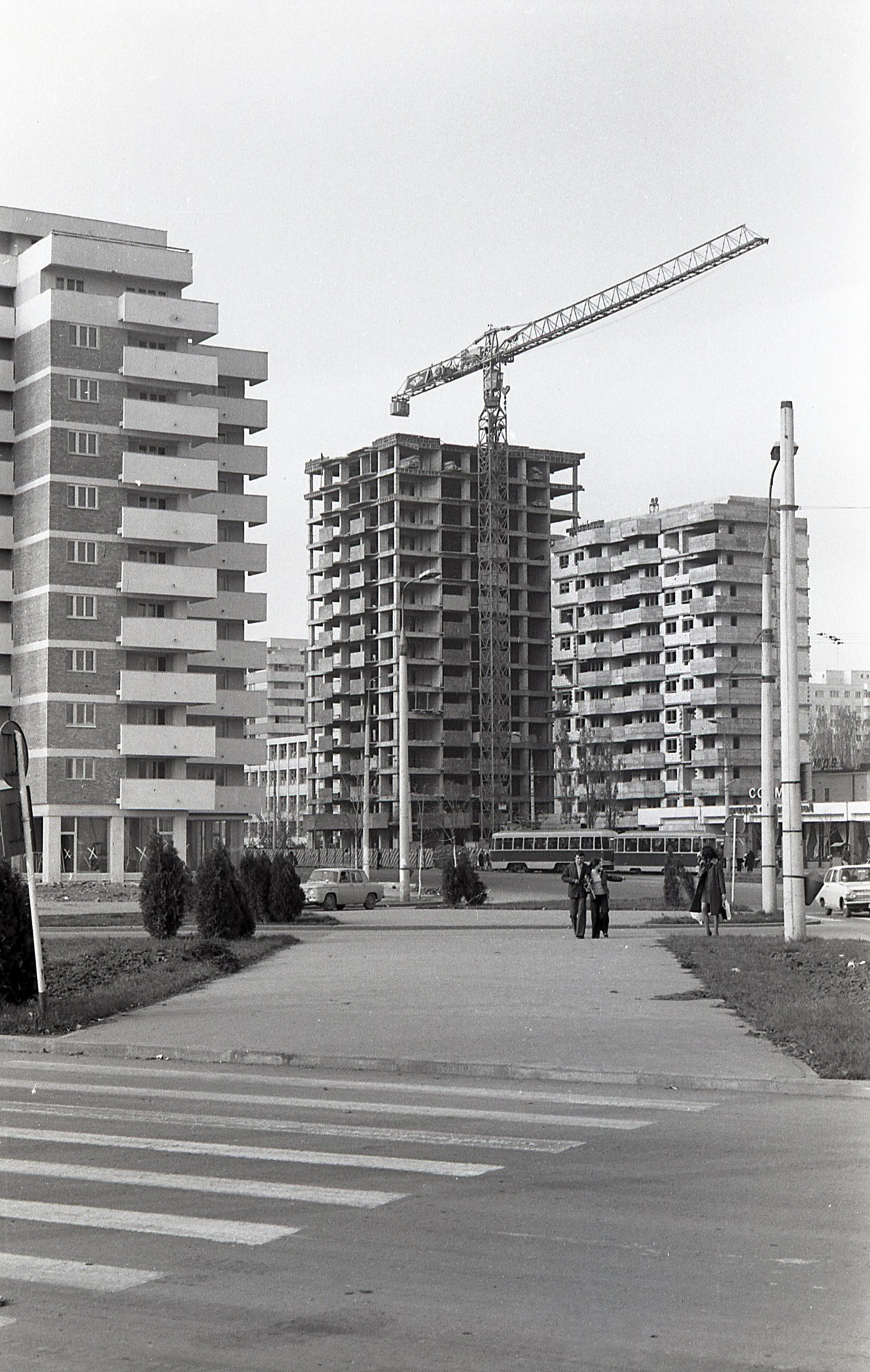
Blocks B1 and B2
