= La Familia (rap group) =

Romanian hip hop group

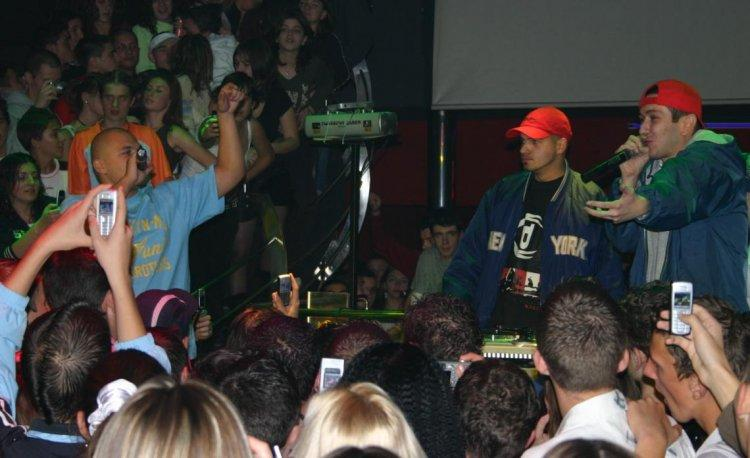
- Puya (far left) and Sișu (far right) at the microphones

Background information
- Also known as: Sișu & Puya
- Origin: Balta Albă Sălăjan, Bucharest, Romania
- Genres: Gangsta rap, G-Funk Christian rap, Conscious rap
- Years active: 1997–2011; 2017–present
- Labels: Cat Music, Scandalos Music
- Members: Puya; Sișu Tudor; DJ Wicked

La Familia are a Romanian hip hop group from Sălăjan, Bucharest. Founded in 1997 by Dragoș "Puya" Gărdescu and Tudor Sișu, they have been widely regarded as pioneers of the gangsta rap subgenre in their native Romania.

Mentored by fellow gangsta rap group B.U.G. Mafia, they quickly emerged as one of Romania's most popular rap acts in the late 1990s and early 2000s. In 2003, group member Tudor Sișu was sentenced to three years in prison after being arrested by Romanian authorities in a widely publicized drug-trafficking case. The group also lost the rights to its name after a public feud with former mentors B.U.G. Mafia, whom they had lyrically attacked in an unreleased song the previous year. Group member Puya worked mostly individually on their 2004 effort, before managing to recover the rights for the band's name following a lengthy court trial. In late 2005, Sișu was paroled and the group resumed its activity before finally disbanding in 2011. This followed a string of failed attempts at releasing a comeback album. Gărdescu and Sișu have remained cordial, reuniting frequently on each other's solo efforts and occasionally for live performances.

In 2017, they reunited as La Familia and released the Codul bunelor maniere (The code of good manners) album.

== History ==
=== Formation and first three albums (1997–1999) ===
Tudor Sișu and Dragoș "Puya" Gardescu, grew up in the Balta Albă Sălăjan neighborhood from Bucharest, Romania, both of them being fans of Tupac Shakur. They both started rapping as teenagers, each having their own band, Sișu's being Il-egal that was formed together with three neighbors from his apartment block which later united with bands Delikt and Apă tare, forming Asasinii noii ere, while Puya was a member of the Ghetto Birds band. Sișu and Puya met for the first time while they were with their bands at B.U.G. Mafia member, Tataee's home. Shortly after they decided to form a band together, naming it La Familia after a song with the same name performed by Kid Frost.

Their first album, Băieți de cartier (Hoodboys) was released also in 1997 and was sold in 10.000 copies, which was beyond their expectations as they did not have any videos for any song and the music piracy going on in the country in those times. In 1998, the group had its first video and national hit, called "Tupeu de borfaș" which was featuring female singer Marijuana and had lyrics dissing R.A.C.L.A. and Getto Daci. The song was part of their second album, Nicăieri nu-i ca acasă (There's no place like home). La Familia's third album, Bine ai venit în Paradis (Welcome to Paradise) was released in 1999 and contained two of their best ever hits which they also made videos for them, "Probleme de familie" (Family problems) and "Vorbe" (Words) featuring B.U.G. Mafia member, Uzzi.

=== Hits and troubles (2000–2011) ===
In 2000, the group released its first EP, called Ca la Noi (As We Do It), the following year releasing the album Familiarizează-te (Familiarize yourself).

In 2003, La Familia released its fifth album Punct și de la capăt (Full stop. New paragraph) which contained two hits, "Zi de zi" (Day by day) and "Viață bună" (Good life), both of them featuring Don Baxter, the first one also featuring Cabron. In the same year, Sișu was arrested for drug-trafficking, while Puya was arrested for the use of fake credit cards in Belgium, also shortly afterwards, they got into a beef with their former mentors, B.U.G. Mafia who registered the La Familia name to the State Office for Inventions and Trademarks, not allowing them to use it anymore. In 2004 under the name Sișu & Puya, they released the album Foame de bani (Hunger for money) which was performed mostly by Puya, as Sișu was still in jail at the time. The album contained a diss track against B.U.G. Mafia that became a hit, the song having the same name as the album. Also in the same year, Puya created his own record label called Scandalos Music and the following year DJ Wicked joined the band. In 2006, they released the O mare familie (One big family) album, then the following year, they released a greatest hits album called De 10 ani tot în familie (For 10 years still in the family) which was released with a concert held by Puya in the Jilava Prison where Sișu was still imprisoned.

After recovering the La Familia name in 2010 after the trial with B.U.G. Mafia, they released a song called Pești mici (Little fishes) which was included on the soundtrack of the short film with the same name in which Puya played the main character. However the group disbanded in the following year.

=== Reunion (2017–present) ===
Sișu and Puya reunited in 2017, releasing the first album under the name of La Familia since the name recovery called Codul bunelor maniere (The code of good manners) which contained the Dulce Răzbunare (Sweet vengeance) song featuring M3thaphour, which contained lyrics against Șatra B.E.N.Z. After six years, they released another album called Foarte (Very).

== Legal issues and controversies ==
In 1997, Sișu and Puya, together with B.U.G. Mafia members Tataee, Caddilac and Uzzi, were taken into police custody after a concert in Turnu Severin, being charged with outrage against good customs. They were eventually released after 10 hours of giving statements at the police station and the district attorney's office. The Romanian media brought the case to national attention, this being the starting point of a media frenzy that would bring a lot of unexpected fame for both La Familia and B.U.G. Mafia. At Paraziții's Nici o problemă (No Problem) album release concert from 1999, a fight started between the band members of La Familia and R.A.C.L.A.

Sișu was arrested for drug-trafficking on several occasions, the first time being in 2003, spending a total of 6 years in prison. In the same year, Puya spent four months in a prison in Belgium for the use of fake credit cards, being released after a bail was paid.

In 2004 they had a big conflict with their former friends, B.U.G. Mafia who registered the La Familia name to the State Office for Inventions and Trademarks, not allowing them to use it anymore. According to B.U.G. Mafia member, Tataee, the roots of the conflict started about two years earlier when Mafia created their own record label, named Casa Productions and they wanted them to join as members but La Familia wanted only as partners. As Mafia did not accept to be partners, La Familia made a diss track aimed against them called Cu cărțile pe față (With the cards face up) which was never officially released but Mafia found out about it and one of its members, Caddy registered the La Familia name to the State Office for Inventions and Trademarks, asking Sișu and Puya 15.000€ to give them the name back. After a long trial between Puya and Caddy, in 2010 the High Court of Cassation and Justice gave the La Familia name to Puya. At the MTV Romania Music Awards 2006 edition, Puya got into a fight with Grasu XXL and Tataee in the backstage, after the latter spat on him.

In 2022, Puya was caught by police officers driving his scooter in Bucharest under the influence of cocaine.

== Members ==
- Sișu (1997–2011, 2017–)
- Puya (1997–2011, 2017–)
- DJ Wicked (2005–2011, 2017–)

== Discography ==
=== Studio albums ===
- 1997 - Băieți de Cartier (Hoodboys)
- 1998 - Nicăieri nu-i ca acasă (There's no place like home)
- 1999 - Bine ai venit în Paradis (Welcome to Paradise)
- 2001 - Familiarizează-te (Familiarize yourself)
- 2003 - Punct și de la capăt (Full stop. New paragraph)
- 2004 - Foame de bani (Hunger for money)
- 2006 - O mare familie (One big family)
- 2017 - Codul bunelor maniere (The code of good manners)
- 2023 - Foarte (Very)

=== Extended plays ===
- 2000 - Ca la noi (As we do it)

=== Greatest hits albums ===
- 2007 - De 10 ani tot în familie (For 10 years still in the family)
