= Romanian hip-hop =

Music genre

Romanian hip hop first emerged in 1982, along with the break-dancing movement which became very popular in the 1980s. However, Romanian hip hop was developed in the early 1990s, when American rappers hit the European charts. Most notable Romanian hip hop artists come from Bucharest, Romania's capital and largest city and most notable trap from Craiova and Bucharest. The genre is currently growing in popularity in Europe.

== Summary ==
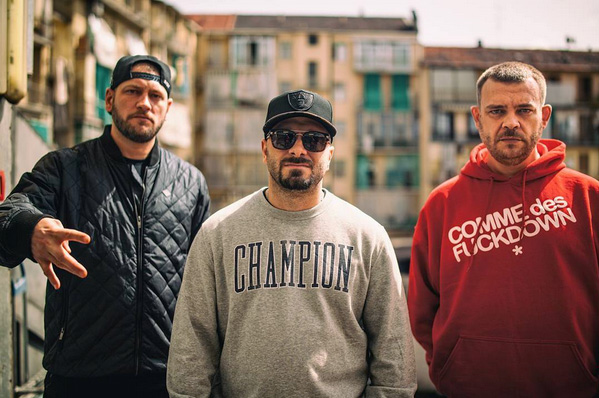
B.U.G. Mafia

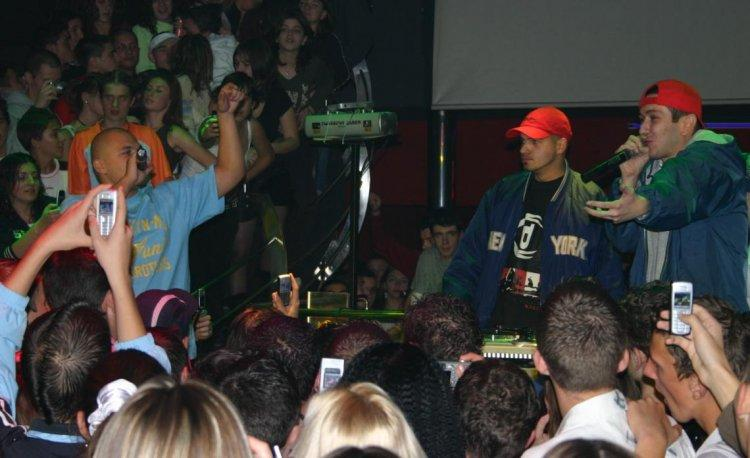
La Familia

The Romanian Revolution of 1989 was the main precursor of Romanian hip hop. Liberalization made the import of foreign hip hop tapes much easier. An underground market of tape exchanges among teens started flourishing in the early 90s. From just listening to hip hop to making hip hop there was only a small step. The first Romanian hip hop group was Vorbire Directă (Direct Speech) founded in late 1992, their first song being released in 1993 on UniPlus Radio. However, the first hip hop album was released only in 1995 by R.A.C.L.A. and was called Rap-Sodia efectului defectului (Defect Effect Rap-sody).

Names such as Paraziții, B.U.G. Mafia, M&G, Renegații, Da Hood Justice, Delikt, Dublu Sens, Morometzii, Getto Daci and countless others started appearing between 1993 and 1995. Some of these early groups are still active today. The first songs were about politics, the struggle of life in post-communist Romania and crimes. The first hip hop concert in Romania took place on May 14, 1993, at Sala Polivalentă in Bucharest, which included guest performers from France such as Alliance Ethnik, Sléo, Démocrates D and Ragga Sonic.

The divergence between east coast hip hop and west coast hip hop was soon imported into Romania with the creation of the Cartel ("Cartelul") representing the west coast with groups like B.U.G. Mafia, La Familia, Il-Egal, Dana Marijuana, Don Baxter, M&G, and of RANS - "The Cry of National Agony - Syndicate" ("Răcnetul Agoniei Naționale - Sindicat") representing the east coast with groups like R.A.C.L.A., Paraziții, Da Hood Justice, Ghetto Dacii, Delikt. However, this conflict was short-lived, and by the end of the 1990s there was peace among hip hop artists in Romania.

The most notable songs released in this period were "Pantelimonu' Petrece" and "Hoteluri" by B.U.G. Mafia in 1996 and 1997, "A vorbi e ușor" by Parazitii in 1997, "Cei care te calcă pe cap" and "Gara de Nord" by R.A.C.L.A. in 1997 and 1998 respectively.

1998 and 1999 brought a much better sound to Romanian hip-hop due to competing recording studios. Albums such as "De cartier" (Hood-like) by B.U.G. Mafia, "Nicăieri nu-i ca acasă" (There's no place like home) by La Familia and especially "Nici o problemă" (Not a problem) by Paraziții had a far better sound quality than anything previously released.

Since the turn of the millennium, even though they have received only sporadic radio and TV airplay, B.U.G. Mafia and Paraziții have earned a cult status among Romanians, and they are still popular to this day. B.U.G. Mafia were the first Romanian rap group to perform outside Romania, touring in Italy, Spain, Germany and the United Kingdom.

In the late 2000s, besides the commercial success of La Familia member Puya, a new wave of rappers such as Guess Who, Grasu XXL, Spike, Cabron, Maximilian, Tranda, Nane and the groups CTC and Specii rose to prominence, some of them dominating the charts. Some current old-school-inspired groups and artists include Haarp Cord, El Nino, Jianu, Zale, F Charm, Nimeni Altu', Vescan and Phunk B.

In 2015, trap music was popularized in Romania by the group Șatra B.E.N.Z. Despite being criticized for lacking political and social messages and for their unorthodox style, even being compared to manele, their second album O.$.O.D. II (2017) and group member Killa Fonic's mixtape Ramses 1989 (2016) were well received. Șatra B.E.N.Z. and Golani paved the way for YouTube-based artists such as Lino Golden, abi and 5GANG, who were popular through 2018 and 2019 among youngsters. From late 2018 throughout mid-2019, rappers such as Ian, Azteca, Amuly, Oscar and a stylistically changed Nane gained massive popularity, making trap the main musical current of the new generation. After the COVID-19 pandemic, many new artists emerged: Bvcovia, Marko Glass, Albert NBN, MGK666, Aerozen, Tussin, YNY Sebi, Petre Ștefan, Berechet, Călinacho, Șapte, Yakki, Bruja, M.G.L. etc. Besides trap, they have experimented with other styles such as pop, manele, R&B, drill, house, techno and rage. Gheboasa represents a significant advancement in the Romanian rap scene, coming from a Roma background.

A documentary about the history of Romanian Hip-Hop under the name From the Shadows / Din Umbre was set to be released in 2015.

== See also ==
- European hip-hop
