= List of parks in Bucharest =

This is a list of parks in Bucharest.

Name	Area (hectares)	Year created	References
Bazilescu Park	13.5	1954	
Bordei Park	13	1938	
Botanical Garden	17.5	1860	
Carol Park	45	1906	
Circus Park	26.393	1958	
Cișmigiu Gardens	16	1847	
Drumul Taberei Park	30	1960	
Floreasca Park	22	1960	
Grădina Icoanei	2.4	1873	
Herăstrău Park	110	1936	
Izvor Park	17	1990	
Kiseleff Park	3.1	1843	
Marin Preda Park	4	2017	
Plumbuita Park	80	1977	
IOR/Titan Park	85	1970	
Tineretului Park	82.7	1974	
Văcărești Nature Park	190	2016	
