= Să cânte trompetele =

"Să Cânte Trompetele"

Single by B.U.G. Mafia featuring Feli
- Released: December 18, 2014
- Recorded: 2014; Ines Sound & Video (Bucharest, Romania)
- Genre: Hip hop
- Length: 4:27
- Label: Casa Productions
- Songwriters: Vlad Irimia; Dragoș Vlad-Neagu; Alin Demeter
- Producers: Tataee; Cristi Dobrică (add.)

B.U.G. Mafia singles chronology
"Fără cuvinte" (2011)	"Să Cânte Trompetele" (2014)	"Pe coastă" (2016)

"Să Cânte Trompetele" (Let the Trumpets Play) is a single by Romanian hip hop group B.U.G. Mafia, featuring vocals by Feli Donose. It was released via digital download on December 18, 2014. The song was produced by Tataee and mixed by longtime collaborator Cristian Dobrică, who also provided additional production.

== Background ==
The single was first announced by the group on its official Facebook page on September 27, 2014. Group member Tataee referenced the song on his Facebook account on November 20 and mentioned it was going to be part of an E.P. containing two other tracks and a music video. These plans were later scrapped when on December 5, the group posted a short video with Tataee recording his vocals for the song, and announced the single would be released without a music video. When asked by the fans, the group's management team mentioned that the group had stopped doing music videos altogether, instead choosing to focus on producing and releasing stand-alone songs.

== Composition ==
"Să Cânte Trompetele" was composed by longtime producer and group founder Tataee, who was assisted by his sound engineer Cristian Dobrică, who is credited with providing additional production to the song. Fellow group members Dragoș "Caddilac" Vlad-Neagu and Alin "Uzzi" Demeter co-wrote the lyrics, while Vocea României contestant Feli Donose recorded the chorus. Musically, the song makes use of a prominent horn section, written and arranged by Dobrică, thus making the connection with its title which translates to "Let the Trumpets Play". Lyrically, the song is similar to older B.U.G. Mafia singles, such as "Cu Tălpile Arse" (With Burned Feet), or the more recent "Bag Pula-n Lume Și V-o Fac Cadou" (Fuck The World, You Can Have It Back), detailing struggles the group had to go through in its tumultuous 20-year history, while also including some political and social commentary.

== Commercial performance ==
The song has not been released for commercial download, but throughout 2015 became successful on a number of mainstream Romanian radio stations. Kiss FM included it in a poll for "Song of the Year" in December 2015, while Pro FM has ranked it 19th in a list of its most played songs during 2015. On the group's official account on YouTube, the song had over 49,000,000 views and over 237,000 likes as of August 2021.

== Live performances ==
The group has performed the song live numerous times, most notably on three occasions, at a Radio ZU concert in Sibiu with some 50,000 people in attendance and twice live on Radio ZU, during Mihai Morar's morning show, respectively.

== Track listing ==
Digital single

No.	Title	Writer(s)	Producer(s)	Length
1.	"Să Cânte Trompetele"	V.Irimia, A.Demeter, D.Vlad-Neagu	Tataee	4:27
