= Șoseaua Kiseleff =

Thoroughfare in Bucharest, Romania

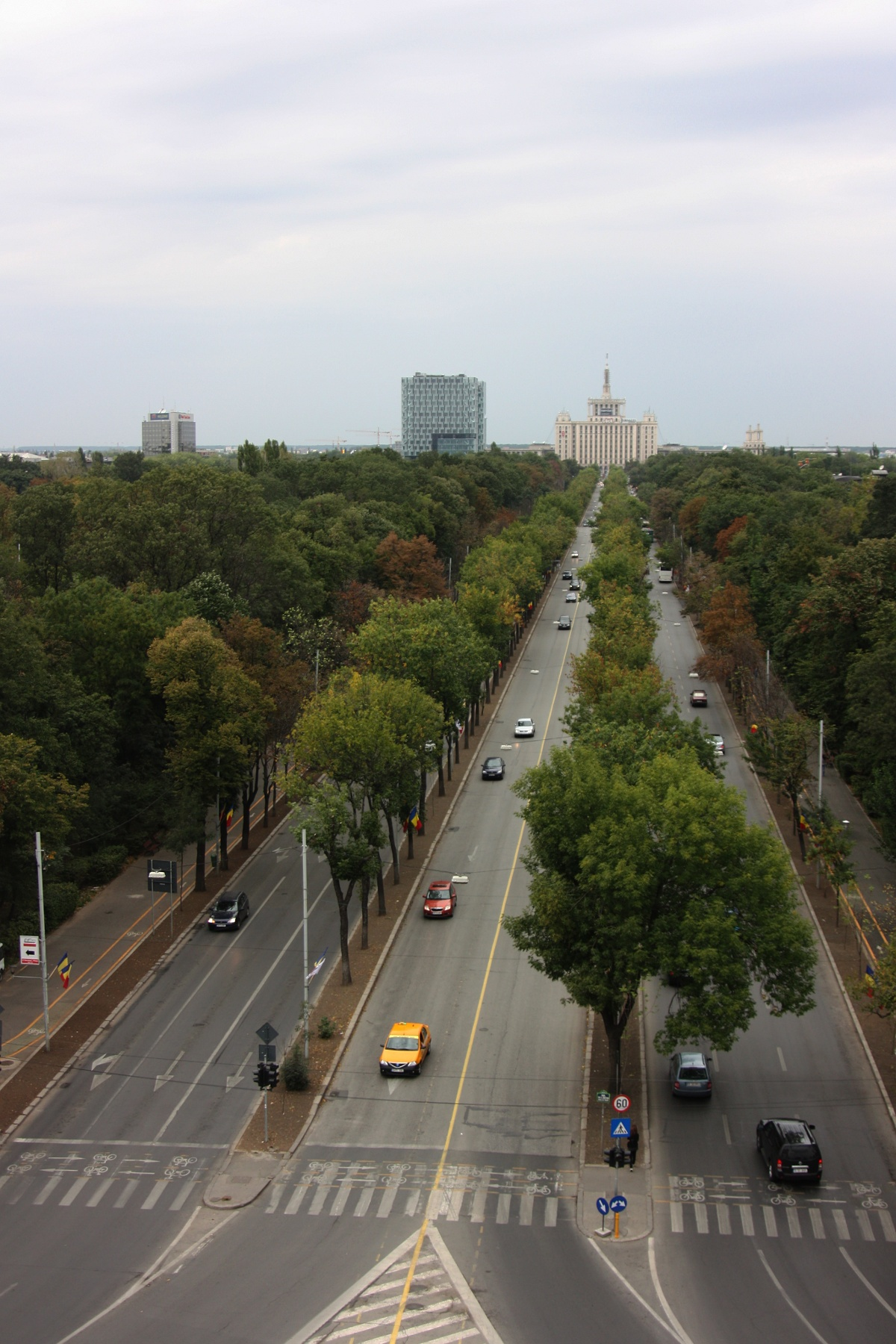
- View from Arcul de Triumf, towards the House of the Free Press
- Interactive map of Șoseaua Kiseleff
- Location: Bucharest, Romania
- Nearest metro station: Piața Victoriei 44°28′20.27″N 26°4′31.63″E
- South end: Victory Square
- Major junctions: Arcul de Triumf
- North end: House of the Free Press

Construction
- Inauguration: 1832

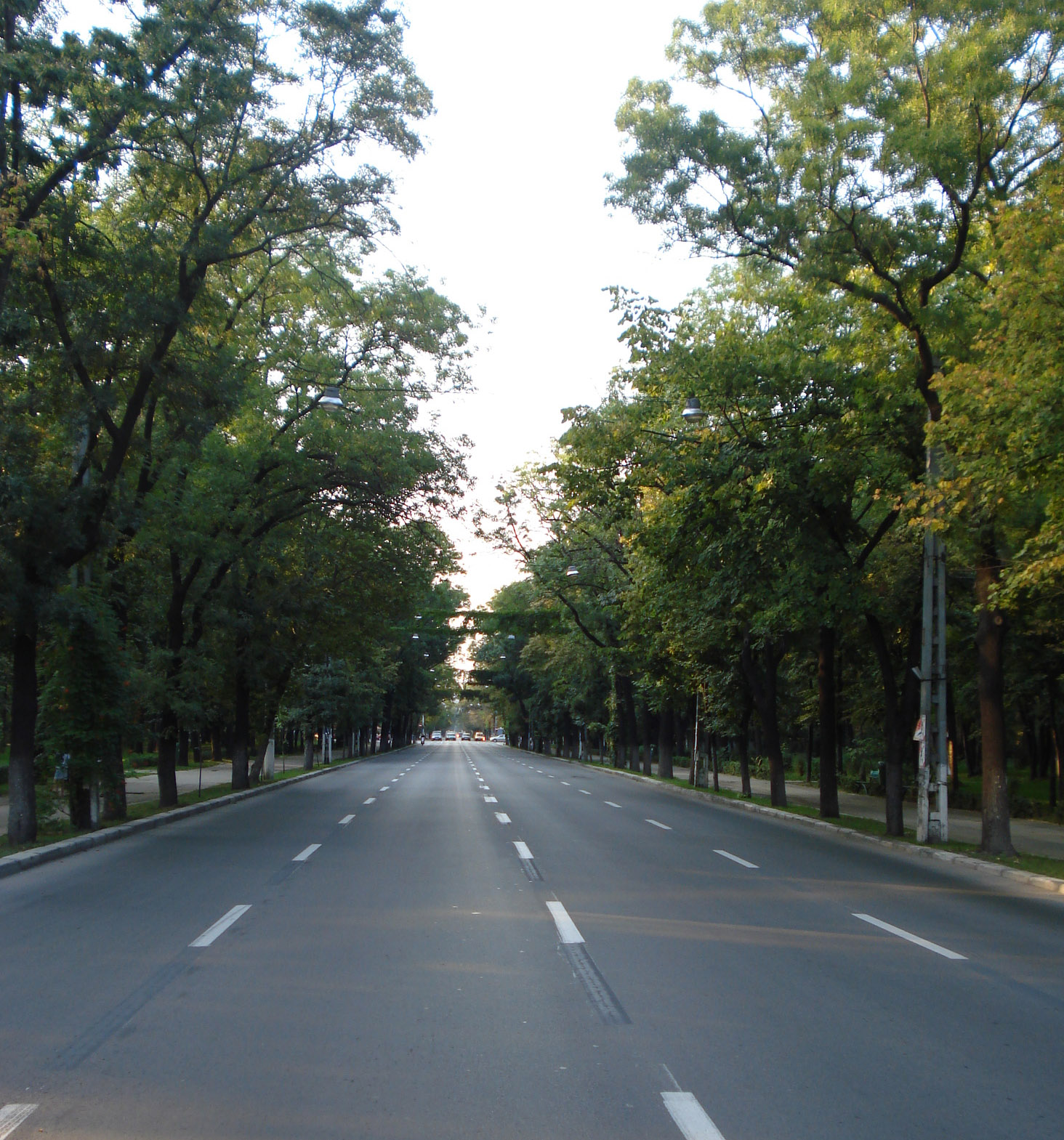
Șoseaua Kiseleff

Șoseaua Kiseleff (Kiseleff Road) is a major road in Bucharest, Romania. Situated in Sector 1, the boulevard runs as a northward continuation of Calea Victoriei.

== History ==
The road was created in 1832 by Pavel Kiselyov, the commander of the Russian occupation troops in Wallachia and Moldavia. The name was converted from Kiselyov to Kiseleff, using the French transliteration of Russian names at the time.

The area was not affected by the Ceaușima systematization plans and demolitions of Nicolae Ceaușescu, and has many pre-World War II residences.

== Features ==
Victory Square (Piața Victoriei) and Free Press Square (Piața Presei Libere) stand at its two extreme points. The street has numerous museums, parks (Kiseleff Park and Herăstrău Park), grand residences, and the Arcul de Triumf along it between those end points.

=== Notable buildings ===
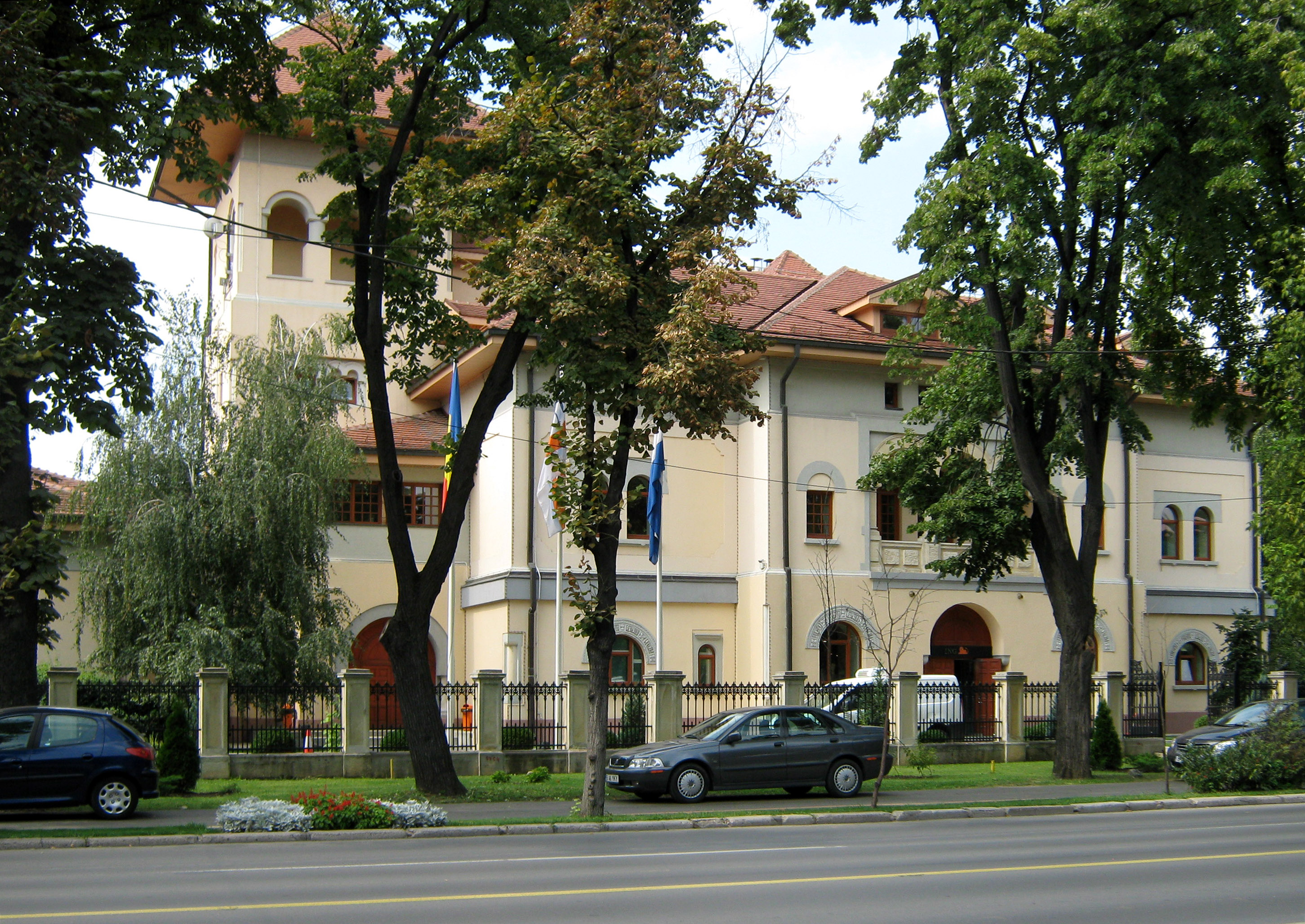
The Kiseleff Royal Palace

Notable buildings on Șoseaua Kiseleff include:

- The Museum of the Romanian Peasant
- The Geology Museum
- The Grigore Antipa National Museum of Natural History
- The Village Museum
- The Elisabeta Palace, residence of Crown Princess Margareta
- The Kiseleff Palace, currently the headquarters of ING Bank Romania
- The Kiseleff Roadside Buffet; designed by architect Ion Mincu in 1892, it now houses the Casa Doina Restaurant.
- The headquarters of the Social Democratic Party.

Also along Șoseaua Kiseleff one finds the embassies of Belarus, Canada, Peru, and Russia, as well as the residence of the Ambassador of the United States to Romania.
