= Fără cuvinte =

"Fără Cuvinte"

Single by B.U.G. Mafia featuring Loredana Groza

from the album Înapoi În Viitor
- Released: June 29, 2011
- Recorded: 2010; Ines Sound & Video (Bucharest, Romania)
- Genre: Hip hop
- Length: 4:20
- Label: Casa Productions
- Songwriter(s): Alin Demeter; Dragoș Vlad-Neagu; Vlad Irimia
- Producer(s): Tataee

B.U.G. Mafia singles chronology
"Cât poți tu de tare" (2010)	"Fără Cuvinte" (2011)	"Să cânte trompetele" (2014)

Music video
- "Fără Cuvinte" on YouTube

"Fără Cuvinte" (Speechless) is the fifth and final single by B.U.G. Mafia from their ninth studio album, Înapoi În Viitor (Back To The Future). The song features a guest appearance from Romanian pop singer Loredana Groza. Produced by group member Tataee and mixed by longtime B.U.G. Mafia collaborator Cristi Dobrică, it was released for digital download through the group's official website on June 29, 2011.

Musically, "Fără Cuvinte" is predominantly a rap song, backed by a dark, minimalist, drum-heavy production with extra piano keys featured in the introduction and the chorus. However, it also incorporates elements of other genres, particularly pop music with the Loredana Groza-sung chorus and Arabic music, using various ethnic instruments in its instrumental production. Lyrically, the song is largely about the social situation in modern-day Romania and about how the group's members feel frustrated when dealing with day-to-day hardship and violence.

Due to the song's instrumental being leaked onto the Internet several months in advance to its release, it was a significant commercial success on its official release, particularly in the Romania, where it quickly rose to local music charts just days after being released.

== Background ==
The official version premiered through B.U.G. Mafia's official website. It was produced by member and founder Vlad "Tataee" Irimia, who is known for producing and overseeing every group release since their 1995 debut, Mafia. In an interview with Romanian TV station 1Music Channel, Tataee revealed that, after their 1998 collaboration with Loredana Groza, there had been talks about a new track ever since the mid-2000s, but this was the project that he felt she would be most appropriate to work with on. Groza herself told 1Music that she was excited to work with the group again and that she was anxious to hear reactions from their fans. The song features three verses, each from a group member talking about frustration that arises from dealing with selfishness and human nature altogether.

== Music video ==
The video was shot with Alex Ceaușu, the director behind "Cât poți tu de tare" (The Best You Can Be) and "În Anii Ce-au Trecut". The video also premiered on June 29, 2011.

The video begins with an introduction of actors Dragoş Bucur and Mirela Oprişor, who portray an average Romanian family, driving along on a country road while their infant child starts crying in the back of the car. As they start talking and try to comfort their child, they lose control of the car, go on the wrong lane and, as they try to avoid a collision with a truck, they roll over and crash the car. The video then cuts to the crash site with the two parents struggling to get out of the vehicle. As they desperately try to escape and call an emergency service, people start approaching the car, apparently to help them, but as they come closer to the car, they start robbing the two of all their possessions. The video alternates with shots of the group's members reciting their verses and the two characters struggling in agony as witnesses take part in a bizarre bystander effect, not only avoiding to help the two, but taking every valuable object they can find in the car in a scene reminiscent of the 2005 Andrew Niccol drama, Lord of War, meant to portray the absurde implications that poverty casts upon society. The finale reveals the ending of a skillfully crafted dream sequence, as Mirela Oprişor's character suddenly wakes up and comes to realize that she was having a nightmare in the car. The couple is listening to B.U.G. Mafia's previous collaboration with Loredana Groza, a 1998 single called "Lumea e a mea" (The World Is Mine) in the car.

According to Tataee, the video was shot in two locations, one a Bucharest IMGB warehouse and the other an abandoned monastery in Chiajna.

== Track listing ==
Digital single

No.	Title	Writer(s)	Producer(s)	Length
1.	"Fără Cuvinte"	V.Irimia, A.Demeter, D.Vlad-Neagu	Tataee	3:55
