= List of sculptures in Herăstrău Park =

This is a list of sculptures in Herăstrău Park, a park in Bucharest, Romania.

Romanian name	Translation	Sculptor	Year	Material	Coordinates	Notes
Nimfă adormită	Sleeping nymph	Filip Marin	1906 (1960)	marble		Historic monument (B-III-m-A-21039)
Hercule doborând Centaurul	Hercule knocking down the centaur	Ion Jalea	1925	marble		Historic monument (B-III-m-B-19984)
Prometeu	Prometheus	Jef Lambeaux	(2001)	marble		Historic monument (B-III-m-B-19985)
Monumentul Fondatorilor Uniunii Europene	European Union Founders' Monument	Ionel Stoicescu	2006	bronze		Jean Monnet, Robert Schuman, Altiero Spinelli, Alcide de Gasperi, Konrad Adenauer, Walter Hallstein, Paul Henri Spaak, Jean Rey, Johan Willem Beyen, Sicco Mansholt, Joseph Bech, Pierre Werner
Aleea Cariatidelor	Caryatid Alley	Constantin Baraschi (Ionel Stoicescu)	1939 (2005)	composite		20 Romanian peasant women bearing pitchers on their heads
Fântâna Modura	Modura Fountain	Constantin Baraschi	1939 (2006)	stone/composite		
Pescărușii	Gulls	Gabriela Manole-Adoc	1965	stainless steel		
Copii jucându-se	Children Playing	Neculai Enea		stone		
Ion Creangă cu copiii	Ion Creangă with the children	Ion Vlasiu		stone		
Arhitectură	Architecture	Iulia Oniță	1965	stone and gypsum		
Coloana	The Column	Eugen Ciucă	1973	stone		
Obelisc	Obelisk		1990	stone		
Tânără fată la baie (Venus)	Young girl bathing (Venus)		2007	cast iron		

== Statues of animals ==
Romanian name	Translation	Sculptor	Year	Material	Coordinates	Notes
Căprioara	Deer			bronze		
Urs	Bear			stone		
Curcanul	The turkey	Oscar Han	1960	bronze		
Gâscanul	The goose	Vasile Vasiliu-Falti	1960	bronze		

== Statues of people ==
Name	Sculptor	Year	Material	Coordinates	Notes
Theodor Aman	Olga Porumbaru	1953	stone		
Béla Bartók	János Gyarmathy	2003	stone		
Ludwig van Beethoven	Constantin Baraschi]	1953	stone	44.4703345°N 26.0834554°E	
Nicolae Bălcescu	Constantin Baraschi	1953	stone		
Hristo Botev	Ion Vlad, C. Grosu	1953	stone		
Constantin Brâncuși	Ion Irimescu	1967	stone		
Ion Luca Caragiale	Zoe Băicoianu	1953	stone		
Anton Pavlovich Chekhov	Alexandru Mircea Hanc	2005	marble	44.468485°N 26.081426°E	a previous statue of Chekhov in Herăstrău was destroyed by Russophobic vandals after the Romanian Revolution
Frédéric Chopin	Lelia Zuaf, A. Ostrop	1956	stone		
George Coșbuc	Constantin Baraschi	1953	stone	44.4685871°N 26.0814446°E	
Charles Darwin	Vasile Vasiliu-Falti	1953	stone		
Mihai Eminescu	Mihai Onofrei	1953	stone		
Ady Endre	Iosif Mathé	1953	stone		
Naim Frashëri	Odhise Paskali	2006	bronze		
Charles de Gaulle	Mircea Spătaru	2006	bronze		
Mikhail Ivanovich Glinka	Mihai Onofrei	1953	stone		
Johann Wolfgang von Goethe	Dario Lazăr, M. Coșan	1953	stone		
Nicolae Grigorescu	Zoe Băicoianu	1953	stone		
Victor Hugo	M. Sulman, Vasile Vasiliu-Falti	1953	stone		
Vasil Levski	Jeko Spiridonov	2001	bronze		
Ștefan Luchian	Constantin Lucaci	1968	stone		
Sándor Petőfi	Andrei Szobotka	1953	stone		
Ciprian Porumbescu	Gheorghe Anghel	1953	stone		
Shota Rustaveli			bronze	44.4682145°N 26.0821998°E	
Mihail Sadoveanu	Romul Ladea	1966 (2008)	bronze	44.476537°N 26.088772°E	
William Shakespeare	Oscar Han	1953	stone	44.4704762°N 26.0833347°E	
Taras Shevchenko	Giennadij Jerszow	1999	granite		
Rabindranath Tagore					
Pyotr Ilyich Tchaikovsky	Ion Jalea	1953			
Mark Twain	Iosif Fékete	1953	stone		
Lev Tolstoi	Alexandru Mircea Hanc	2004	stone		
Leonardo da Vinci	Constantza Buzdugan		stone		
Grigore Vieru	Răzvan Paul Mihăescu	2010	stone		
Alexandru Vlahuță	Oscar Han	1953	stone		

== Romanian myths and stories ==
Romanian name	Translation	Sculptor	Year	Material	Coordinates	Notes
Fata babei și fata moșului	Old woman's daughter and the old man's daughter	Constantin Foamete		stone		
Dochia	Dochia	Gheorghe Iliescu-Călinești		stone		
Meșterul Manole	Meșterul Manole	Silvia Radu		stone		
Toma Alimoș	Toma Alimoș	Mara Bâscă		stone		
Miorița	Miorița	Ioana Kassargian		stone		
Făt-Frumos	Făt-Frumos	Ion Lucian Murnu	1965	stone	44.468477°N 26.082003°E	
