= Arcul de Triumf =

Triumphal arch in Bucharest

- Romania
- For the Heroes of the War of Independence and World War I
- Unveiled: 1 December 1936
- Location: 44°28′1.99″N 26°4′41.06″E near Șoseaua Kiseleff, Bucharest, Romania
- Designed by: Petre Antonescu

Arcul de Triumf (Romanian; "The Triumphal Arch" Romanian pronunciation: [ˈarkul de tɾiˈuɱf]) is a triumphal arch located on the Kiseleff Road, in the northern part of Bucharest, Romania. The monument, designed by Petre Antonescu, was built in 1921–22, renovated in 1935–36, and renovated again starting in 2014. It commemorates Romania's victory in the First World War and the coronation of King Ferdinand I and his wife Marie.

== History ==
The first, wooden, triumphal arch was built hurriedly, after Romania gained its independence (1878), so that the victorious troops could march under it. Another arch with concrete skeleton and plaster exterior of elaborate sculptures and decoration designed by the architect Petre Antonescu was built on the same site after World War I in 1922. The arch exterior, which had seriously decayed, was replaced in 1935 by the current much more sober neoclassical design, more closely modelled on the Arc de Triomphe in Paris. The new arch, also designed by Antonescu and executed in stone, was inaugurated on 1 December 1936.

Nowadays, Arcul de Triumf is one of the well-known symbols of the Romanian capital. Military parades are held beneath the arch each 1 December, with the occasion of Romanian National Day.

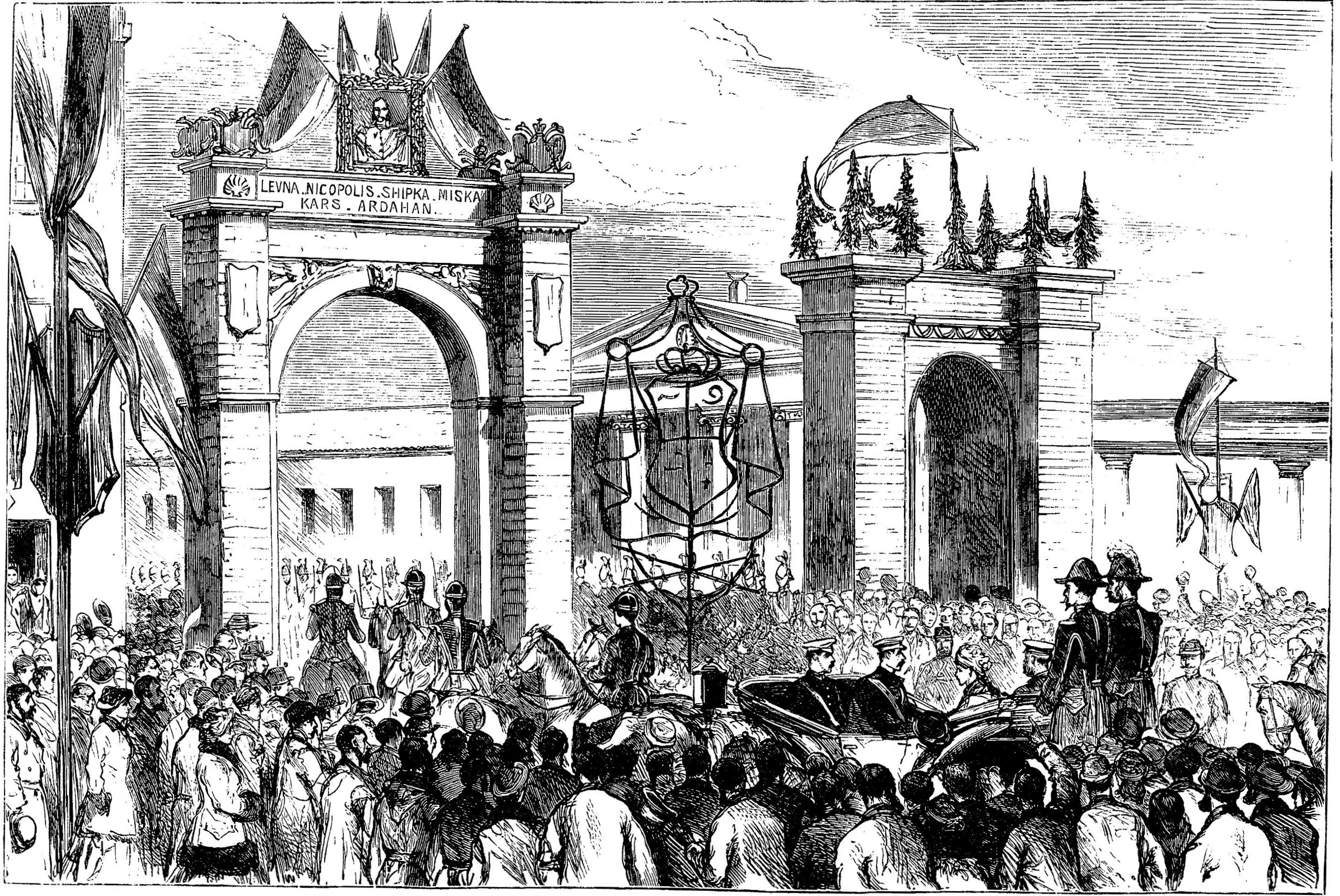
The Russian Tsar's triumphal entry in Bucharest in 1878, wood-engraving from Illustrated London News

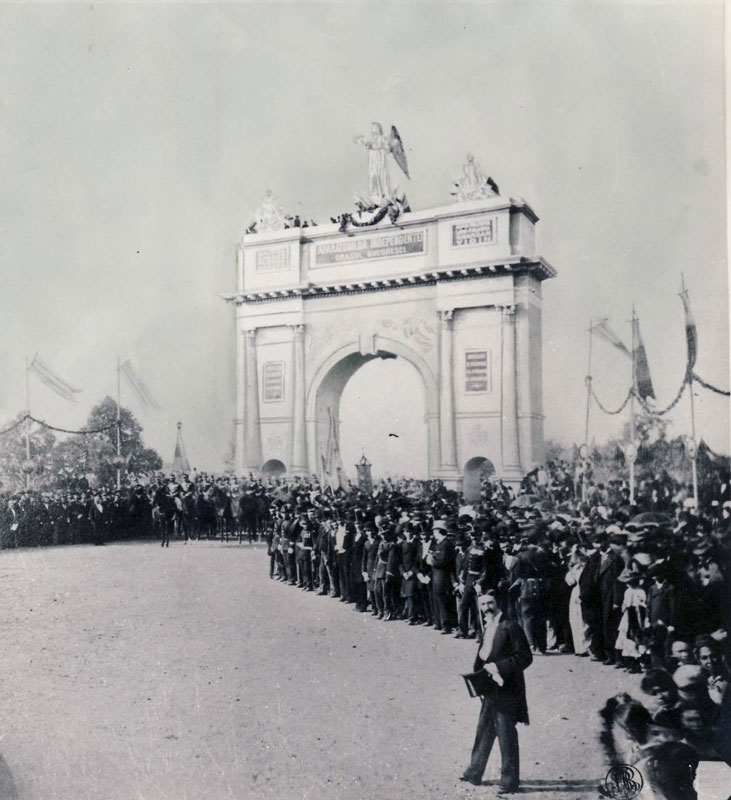
The original Arcul de Triumf in 1878; temporary wooden arch constructed to celebrate Romanian Independence

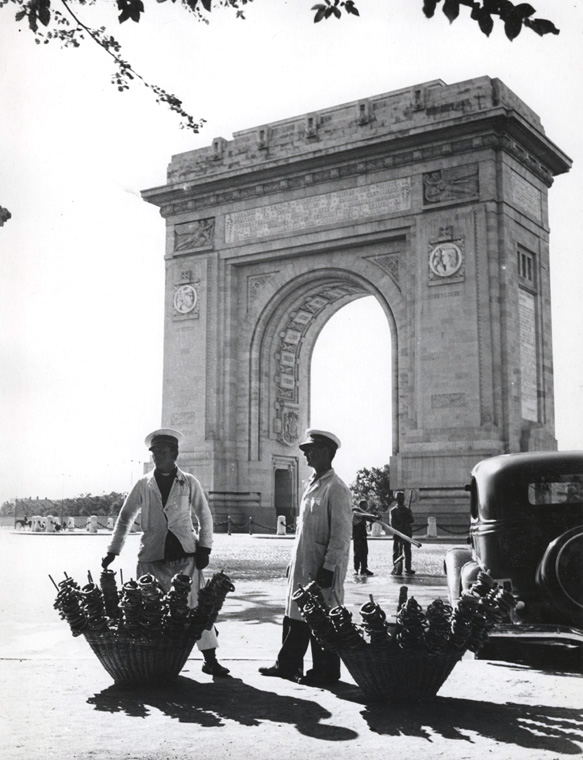
Pretzel vendors in uniform near the current Arcul de Triumf in the late 1930s

== Description and surroundings ==
Arcul de Triumf has a height of 27 metres (89 ft). It has as its foundation a 25 by 11.5 metres (82 by 38 ft) rectangle. The sculptures with which the façades are decorated were created by famous Romanian sculptors such as Ion Jalea and Dimitrie Paciurea.

Elisabeta Palace, the current residence of the Romanian royal family, is located near Arcul de Triumf, in King Michael I Park (Herăstrău Park).

General view of Arcul de Triumf from the Kiseleff Road

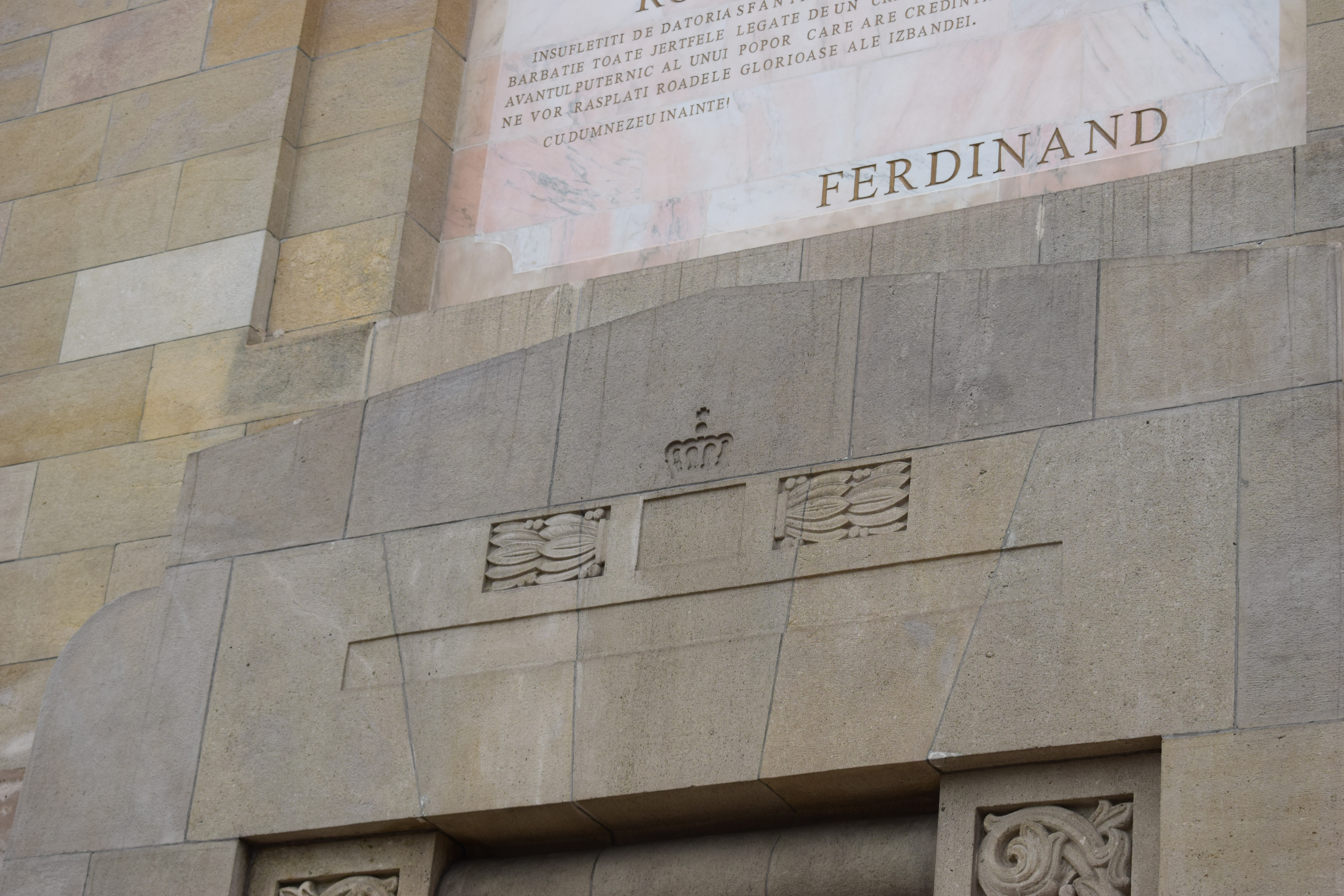
The symbol of the Royal Crown (the Romanian "Steel Crown"), depicted on the Eastern façade

Traffic passing Arcul de Triumf in 2012

Arcul de Triumf undergoing restoration work in 2016

== See also ==
- Arc de Triomphe
