= Zoe Băicoianu =

Romanian sculptor and ceramist

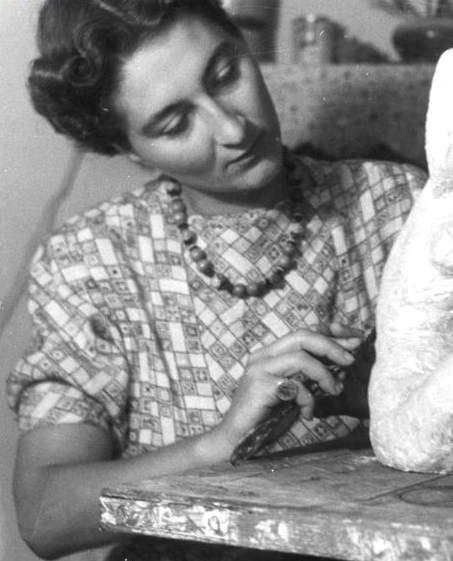
- Born: 15 August 1910; Predeal, Kingdom of Romania
- Died: 8 March 1987 (aged 76); Bucharest, Socialist Republic of Romania
- Education: André Lhote
- Known for: Sculpture; Ceramics

Zoe Băicoianu (15 August 1910 – 8 March 1987) was a Romanian sculptor and ceramist.

== Life ==
Băicoianu was born in Predeal and she studied with André Lhote in Paris in 1937. She also attended the École des Beaux-Arts in Paris and the Romanian Academy in Rome. She was a multidisciplinary artist devoted to fashion and art object (worked metal, glass and wood).

Băicoianu was a professor at the Bucharest National University of Arts. She created the 1953 stone statue of Ion Luca Caragiale which stands in Herăstrău Park. She died in Bucharest in 1987.
