= Înapoi în viitor =

Înapoi În Viitor

Studio album by B.U.G. Mafia
- Released: September 1, 2011
- Recorded: 2009–2011; Ines Sound & Video (Bucharest, Romania)
- Genre: Gangsta rap
- Length: 74:12
- Label: Casa Productions; CPCD001
- Producer: Tataee

B.U.G. Mafia chronology
Viaţa noastră (Deluxe Edition) (2009)	Înapoi În Viitor (2011)

Singles from Înapoi În Viitor
- 1. "Supranatural" Released: March 14, 2010; 2. "Bag Pula-n Lume Şi V-o Fac Cadou (feat. ViLLy)" Released: May 07, 2010; 3. "La Fel De Prost Ca Tine (feat. Bogdan Dima)" Released: December 24, 2010; 4. "Cât poți tu de tare (feat. Bodo)" Released: December 31, 2010; 5. "Fără Cuvinte (feat. Loredana Groza)" Released: June 29, 2011

Înapoi În Viitor (Back To The Future) is the ninth studio album by Romanian hip hop group B.U.G. Mafia, released on September 1, 2011, by Casa Productions in Romania. The album was originally due for a September 2010 release, but was not completed in time. Înapoi În Viitor was the group's first release after their departure from Cat Music, which was their distribution company for over 10 years.

== Background ==
Work for the album started in late 2009, after the group completed the second and final volume of its greatest hits series, Viaţa noastră (Vol.2). The album was released by Cat Music and was the last time B.U.G. Mafia collaborated with the record label, choosing to terminate their contract and go fully independent. This technique was experimented by group producer Tataee on his own Legend Audio imprint when he released JerryCo's debut album. Inspired by professional sports branding, Orice E Posibil was a full digital release, being backed by various companies interested in getting their name across using the artist's album as a promotion tool. Tataee has stated that B.U.G. Mafia was also going to take this route, halting the production of physical CDs on which to release their albums.

== Singles ==
The first single, "Supranatural", was released digitally on YouTube on March 14, 2010, and also as a free download on the group's official website. The production techniques used by Tataee are liberal and experimental for hip hop music, as he had hinted on the second volume of the group's greatest hits album, Viaţa noastră (Vol.2). The song got over 1,000,000 plays on YouTube. The second single, "Bag Pula-n Lume Şi V-o Fac Cadou" (Fuck The World, You Can Have It Back), was released on May 7, 2010, and had success in Romania because of its politically charged content, getting heavy airplay on various radio stations across the country and receiving more than 2,400,000 views on YouTube. The success of the song prompted the group to announce a video, which was later scrapped when several filming locations became unavailable. The album's third single, "La Fel De Prost Ca Tine" (Just As Dumb As You), was released on December 24 on the group's YouTube account. The album's fourth single and the first one to have a music video, "Cât poți tu de tare" (The Best You Can Be) was released on New Year's Eve in 2010.

== Track listing ==
1. "Ziua Independenței" feat. Magic Touch
2. "Înapoi În Viitor" feat. Roxana Andronescu
3. "...Și Cui îi Pasă"
4. "Bag Pula-n Lume Şi V-o Fac Cadou" feat. ViLLy
5. "Când Trandafirii Mor" feat. Lucian Colareza
6. "Cu Premeditare (După Ei)"
7. "Celebrii Anonimi" feat. Luchian
8. "Robolov"
9. "Olimpiada"
10. "Cât poți tu de tare" feat. Bodo
11. "Întâlnire De Gradu' 4" feat. Magic Touch
12. "Ți-o Dau La Muie"
13. "Radio Viitoru'"
14. "O La La" feat. WeedLady
15. "Supranatural"
16. "Care Au Mai Rămas" feat. Marius Săvescu
17. "Fără Cuvinte'" feat. Loredana Groza
18. "5000 De Zile"
19. "La Fel De Prost Ca Tine" feat. Bogdan Dima
20. "Mașina Timpului"
21. "Înainte Să Plec"
22. "Voiaj 01.14.53.44'" feat. Magic Touch
