= National Geological Museum =

Museum in Bucharest, Romania

Coordinates: 44°27′17.47″N 26°5′7.48″E

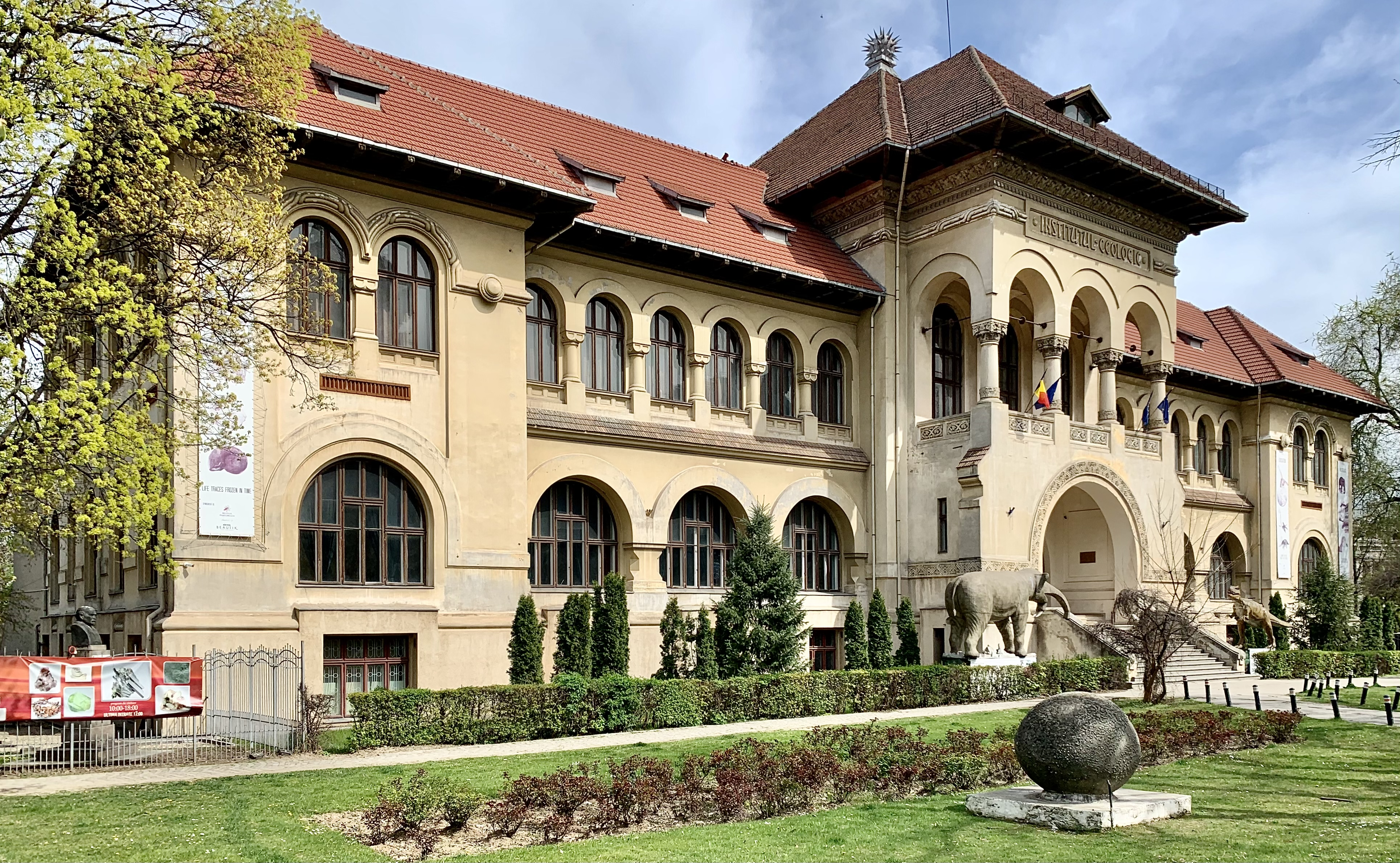
National Geology Museum facade.

The National Geological Museum (Romanian: Muzeul Geologic Național) is located on Şoseaua Kiseleff (street), in Bucharest, Romania. It is located near Victory Square and Kiseleff Park, in central Bucharest. The museum was founded in 1892 and was re-established in 1990.

The museum hosts a collection of 80,000 samples of rocks, fossils, and minerals from Romania.

== Architecture ==
The building was built in 1906-1907 for the Geological Institute of Romania. It was designed by architect Victor Ștefănescu, in the Romanian Revival style.

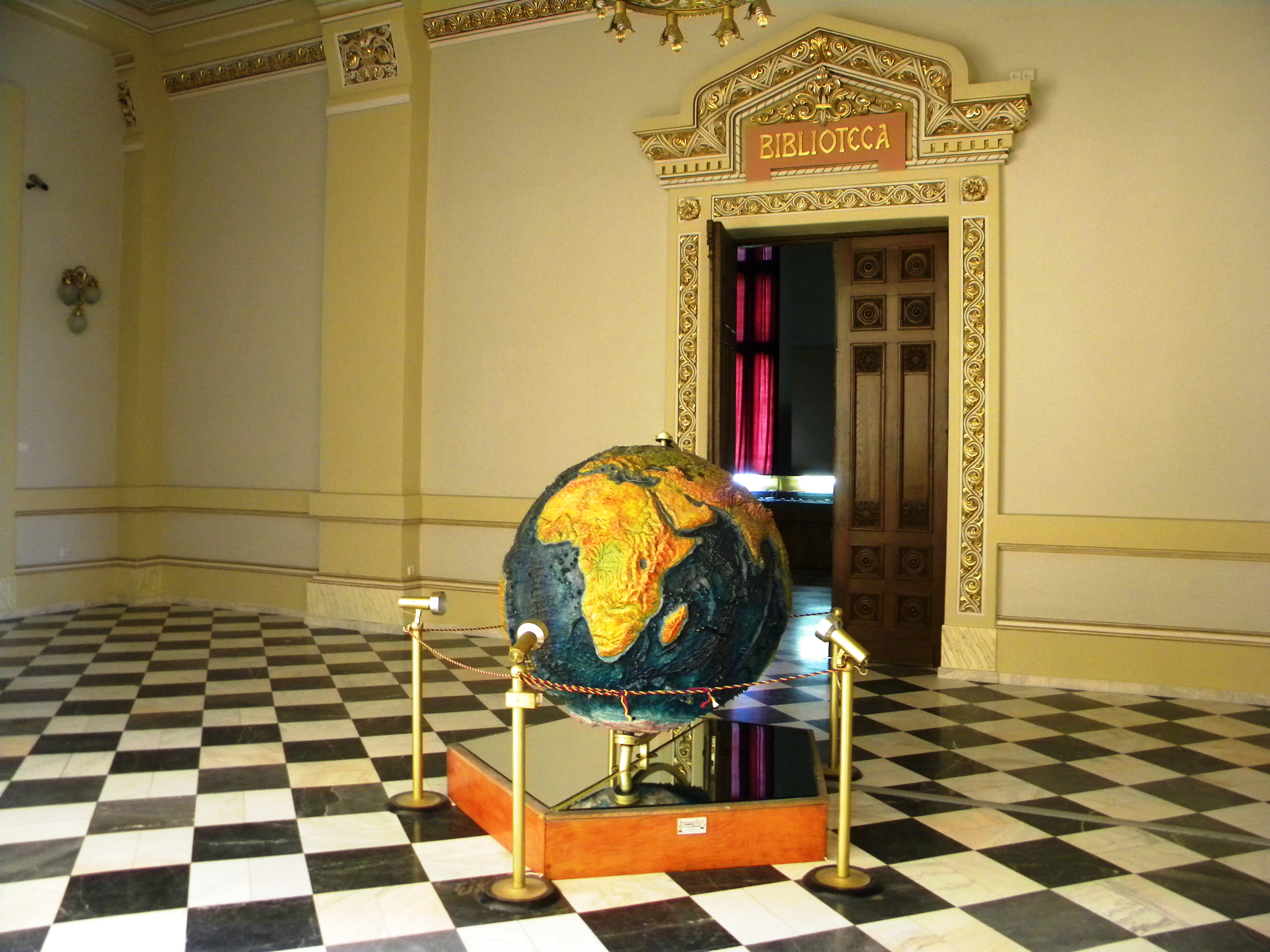
Museum entrance
