= Chiajna Monastery =

Ruined church in Bucharest, Romania

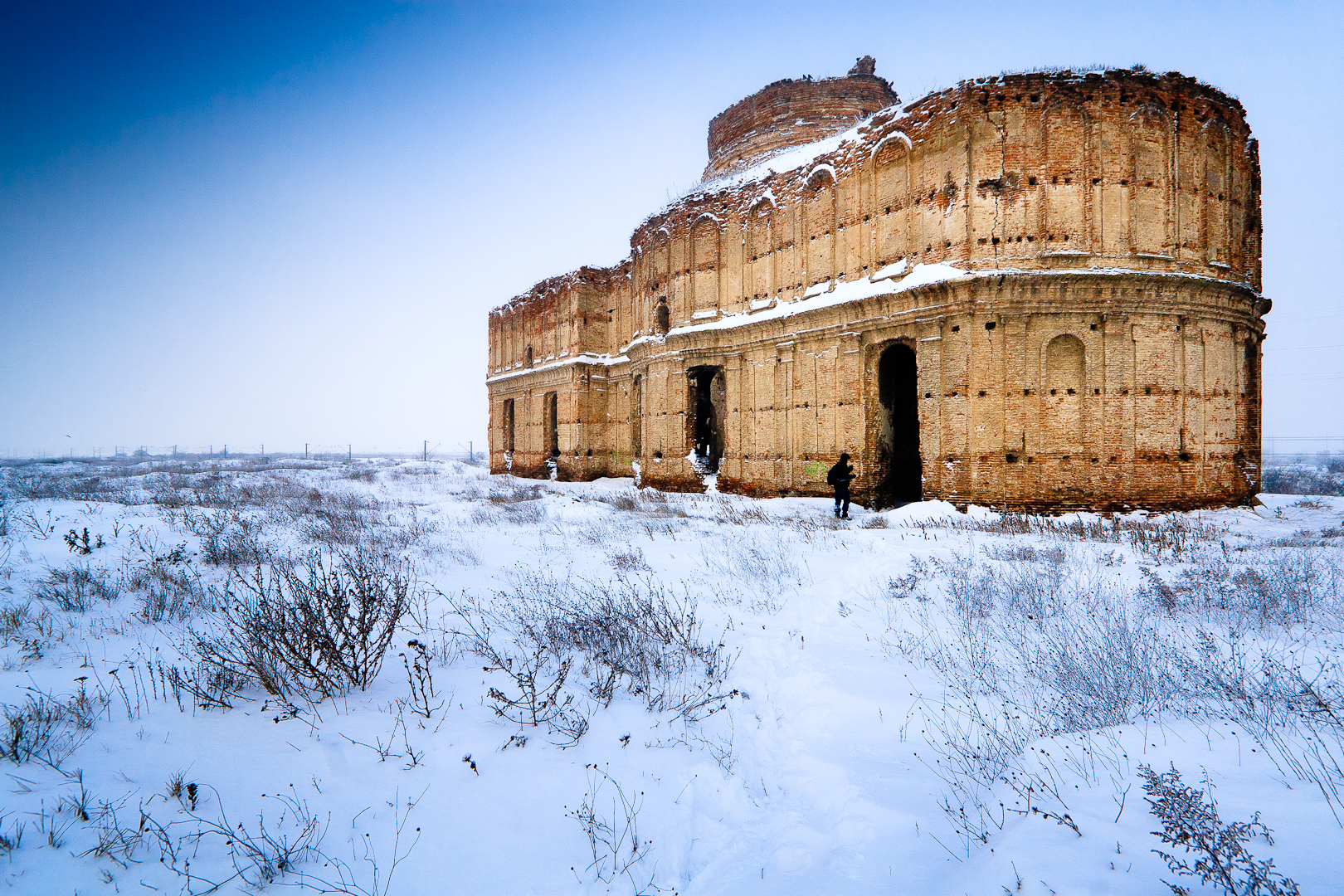
- Winter of 2009

Religion
- Affiliation: Eastern Orthodox
- Ecclesiastical or organisational status: Monastery (since 2008)
- Patron: Saint John Jacob Hosevite
- Status: Active

Location
- Location: Giulești, Bucharest, Romania
- Interactive map of Chiajna Monastery
- Coordinates: 44°28′45.22″N 25°59′53.06″E

Architecture
- Architect: Johannes Rathner
- Type: Church
- Style: Neoclassical
- Founder: Nicholas Mavrogenes
- Groundbreaking: 1780
- Completed: 1790

Specifications
- Length: 43 m (141 ft)
- Height (max): 17 m
- Materials: Brick

Chiajna Monastery is a ruined church situated on the outskirts of Bucharest, Romania which is the subject of many legends, including the story that it is cursed. The information centre, Giulești Park, is devoted to the upkeep and protection of the building, which is a national heritage site.

== History ==
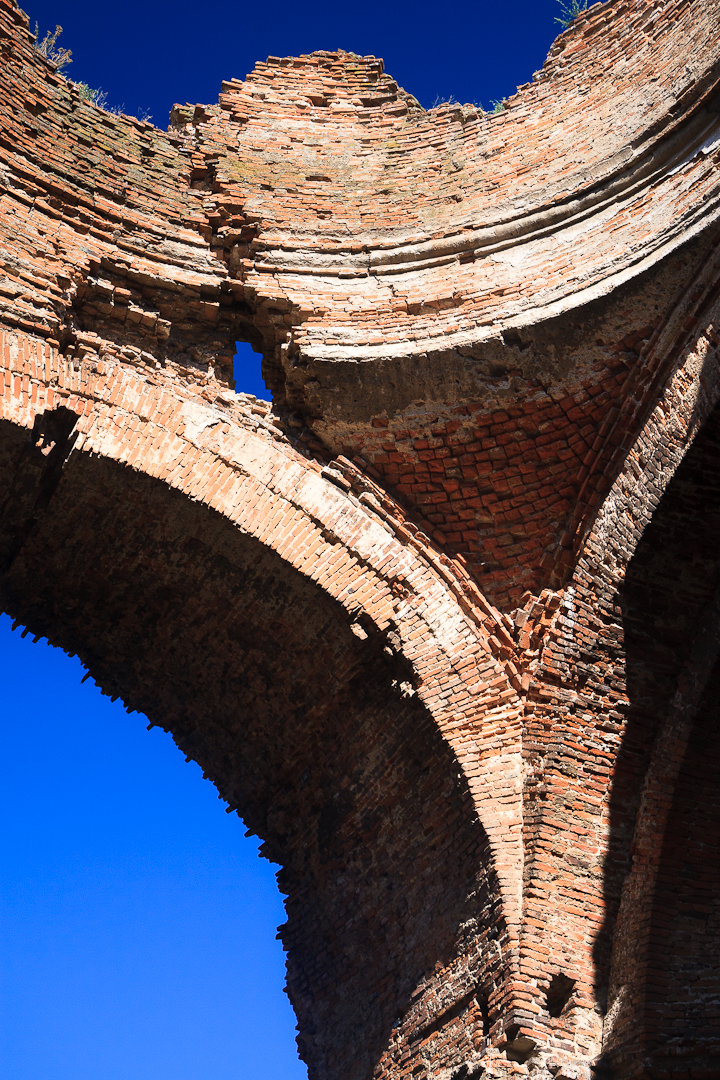
Interior of the Chiajna Monastery

Construction began during the reign of Alexander Ypsilanti (1774–1782) and was completed by Prince Nicholas Mavrogenes (1786–1790) during the Phanariote age also called the Greek origin government of Wallachia. It was built in neoclassical style, and was considered very large for that time: 43 meters long and 18 high, with walls 1 and 2 meters thick. The structure was completed under the rule of Mavrogenes between April 1786 and September 1790.

The church was meant to be one of the most important places of worship for Romania, but that never happened. The monastery was abandoned during the plague in the reign of Alexander Ypsilanti.

Other sources say that work on the monastery began in 1792, but was abandoned during the time of plague, when the prince was Mihai Suțu.

The tower collapsed in the earthquake of 1977.

The monastery is featured in the video for Ava Inferi's "Majesty".

== Legends ==
- Legend says that the church was bombarded by the Turks even before consecration. Reportedly, the Turks believed that the church was a military objective and tried to destroy it. Thus, all the documents within the church were burned, though the building itself remained standing.
- Its great bell was cast into the Dâmbovița River waters and, according to locals, is heard pounding on full moon nights.
- On the wall on the right from the entrance, in about the middle, a few feet high, detaching plaster formed in the appearance of a lady or angel, and some claim it resembles the Sphinx of Giza or Romanian Sphinx.
- Over the years, many disappearances have been reported in the monastery, especially of neighboring Roma people.
- There were two murders, one before and one after 1990.

== Building today ==
The ruin is located in the immediate vicinity of the railway Bucharest - Craiova and near the final approach path to Bucharest airport, the traffic on these routes hastening its degradation. Some architects believe that the monastery can be restored, because a church built from scratch would cost much more.

In April 2011 the monastery was claimed by the church and it now has restoration plans for the site. The place is now bordered by a fence but access is free.
