= La fel de prost ca tine =

"La Fel De Prost Ca Tine"

Single by B.U.G. Mafia featuring Bogdan Dima

from the album Înapoi În Viitor
- Released: December 24, 2010
- Recorded: 2010; Ines Sound & Video (Bucharest, Romania)
- Genre: Hip hop
- Length: 3:55
- Label: Casa Productions
- Songwriter(s): V.Irimia, A.Demeter
- Producer(s): Tataee

B.U.G. Mafia singles chronology
"Bag Pula-n Lume Şi V-o Fac Cadou" (2010)	"La Fel De Prost Ca Tine" (2010)	"Cât poți tu de tare" (2010)

"La Fel De Prost Ca Tine" (Just As Dumb As You) is the third single by B.U.G. Mafia from their ninth studio album, Înapoi În Viitor (Back To The Future). It was released on YouTube and the group's official website on December 24, 2010. The song is produced by Tataee.

== Background ==
The track was recorded by the group in 2010 and was released as a free music download on Christmas Eve as a present to the fans. Produced by Tataee, it was recorded in Bucharest at the Ines Sound & Video studios by long-time collaborator Cristi Dobrică. Pop singer Bogdan Dima is featured on the chorus.

== Content ==
"La Fel De Prost Ca Tine" is a soulful ode to domestic violence victims and depicts the story of a dysfunctional family with an abusive father who uses violence to get his points across. Somewhat similar to the group's 1996 single "Până Când Moartea Ne Va Despărţi" (Until Death Do Us Part), the song received mostly positive feedback from the fans.

== Track listing ==
Digital single

No.	Title	Writer(s)	Producer(s)	Length
1.	"La Fel De Prost Ca Tine"	V.Irimia, A.Demeter	Tataee	3:55
