= Supranatural (B.U.G. Mafia song) =

Single by B.U.G. Mafia

from the album Înapoi În Viitor
- Released: March 14, 2010
- Recorded: 2010; Ines Sound & Video (Bucharest, Romania)
- Genre: Hip hop
- Length: 4:58
- Label: Casa Productions
- Songwriter(s): V.Irimia, D.Vlad-Neagu, A.Demeter
- Producer(s): Tataee

B.U.G. Mafia singles chronology
"În Anii Ce-au Trecut" (2009)	"Supranatural" (2010)	"Bag Pula-n Lume Şi V-o Fac Cadou" (2010)

"Supranatural" is the first single by B.U.G. Mafia from their ninth studio album, Înapoi În Viitor. It was released on YouTube and the group's official website on March 14, 2010. The song is produced by Tataee.

== Background ==
After B.U.G. Mafia released Viaţa noastră (Vol.2) (Our life), the second and final volume of their greatest hits collection, the group started work on a new album, their first after their 2003 Băieţii Buni (Goodfellas). Group producer Tataee stated in various interviews that B.U.G. Mafia were released from their contract with Cat Music and entered a new digital era in which they started to release their music for free on the Internet. As in Romania music piracy boycotts virtually every chance of an artist to make significant profits from their music, the group decided to cut out the middle man, release their own music and earn money from live appearances and advertising.

== Content ==
Tataee stated that, because the group had access to one of the most modern recording studios in Romania, he was able to experiment a lot with production techniques and look for a new sound to fit the group for their new album. The sound has an overall experimental, electronic-influenced feel to it, a direction Tataee had hinted since the release of Viaţa noastră (Vol.2). The song's lyrics reference the group's interest in experimenting with new directions in music: "Supranatural, supranatural, atât de tare-n boxe în scop experimental" (Supernatural, supernatural, so loud in the speakers with an experimental purpose).

== Track listing ==
Digital single

No.	Title	Writer(s)	Producer(s)	Length
1.	"Supranatural"	V.Irimia, D.Vlad-Neagu, A.Demeter	Tataee	4:58
