= Cât poți tu de tare =

Single by B.U.G. Mafia featuring Bodo

from the album Înapoi În Viitor
- Released: December 31, 2010
- Recorded: 2010; Ines Sound & Video (Bucharest, Romania)
- Genre: Hip hop
- Length: 3:55
- Label: Casa Productions
- Songwriter(s): V.Irimia, A.Demeter, D.Vlad-Neagu
- Producer(s): Tataee

B.U.G. Mafia singles chronology
"La Fel De Prost Ca Tine" (2010)	"Cât poți tu de tare" (2010)	"Fără Cuvinte" (2011)

"Cât poți tu de tare" (As hard as you can) is the fourth single by B.U.G. Mafia from their ninth studio album, Înapoi În Viitor (Back To The Future). It was released on YouTube and the group's official website on December 31, 2010. The song is produced by Tataee and mixed by Cristi Dobrica. Kickboxer Daniel Ghiță appeared in the video.

== Background ==
The track was recorded by the group in 2010 and was released as a free music download on New Year's Eve. Produced by Tataee, it was recorded in Bucharest at the Ines Sound & Video studios by longtime collaborator Cristi Dobrică. Rock vocalist Bogdan "Bodo" Marin is featured on the chorus.

== Content ==
"Cât Poți Tu De Tare" is a motivational song urging anyone listening to take advantage of their talent and not be influenced by people's critics.

== Track listing ==
Digital single

No.	Title	Writer(s)	Producer(s)	Length
1.	"Cât poți tu de tare"	V.Irimia, A.Demeter, D.Vlad-Neagu	Tataee	3:55
