= Kiseleff Park =

Park in Bucharest, Romania

- Parcul Kiseleff
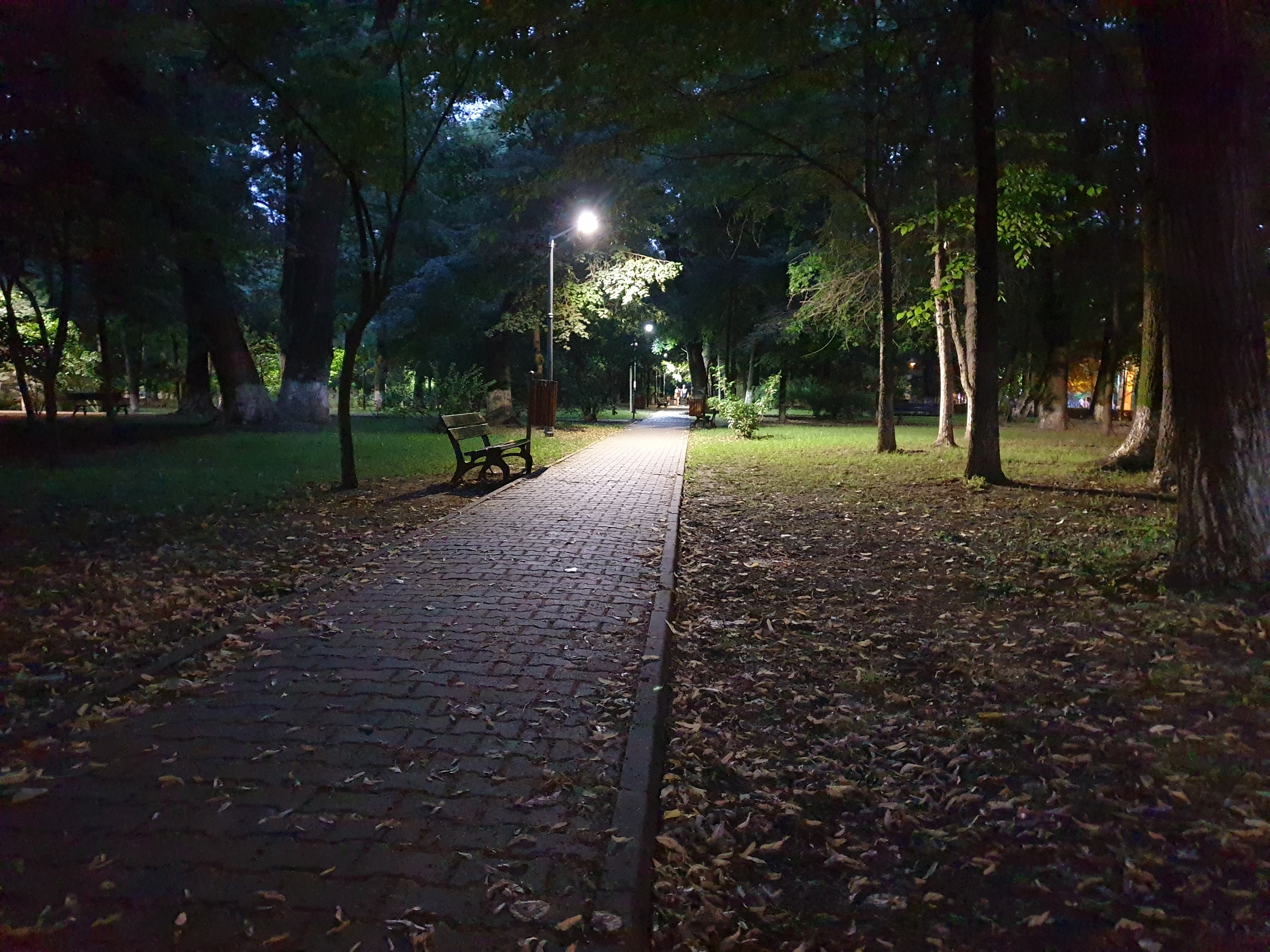
- A night alley in Kiseleff Park

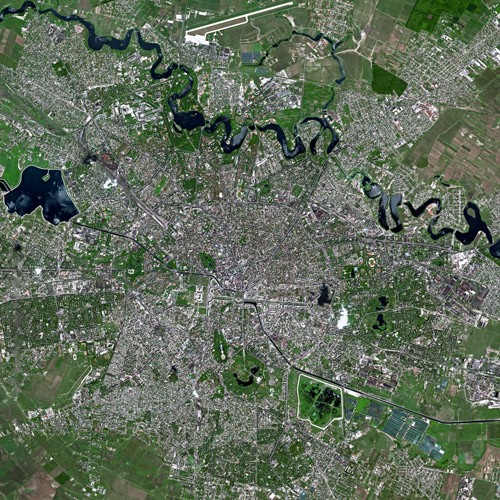
- Location within Bucharest, Romania
- Location: Bucharest, Romania
- Coordinates: 44.457439°N 26.083628°E
- Area: 3.17 hectares (7.8 acres)
- Established: 1832
- Administrator: Administrația Lacuri, Parcuri și Agrement București
- Status: Open all year
- Public transit: Piața Victoriei metro station

Kiseleff Park (Romanian: Parcul Kiseleff) is a public park in northern Bucharest (Sector 1). It is located on both sides of Șoseaua Kiseleff, within the triangle formed by Ion Mihalache Boulevard, Aviators Boulevard, and Ion Mincu Street. In 1915 the park was named after the Russian Count Pavel Kiselyov, who played a key role in the administrative reorganization of the Romanian Principalities and contributed to various urban development projects, including the beautification of Bucharest. The name was converted from Kiselyov to Kiseleff, using the French transliteration of Russian names at the time.

== History ==
The park was developed after 1832, the year in which Șoseaua Kiseleff was built, from the forest located in this part of Bucharest. The completion of the park is associated with the names of Gheorghe Bibescu and his brother, the successor to the throne, Barbu Știrbey. The landscape architect responsible for the park's design was Wilhelm Mayer, the same landscape architect who also contributed to the development of Cișmigiu Gardens. Currently, the park covers an area of 31,690 m^{2} (341,100 sq ft).

== Landmarks ==
Inside the park, several statues are scattered, representing the busts of cultural figures: Nicolae Leonard, Ovid, Barbu Ștefănescu Delavrancea. On the pedestal where the statue of King Ferdinand I once stood, the statue of the Persian poet and astronomer Omar Khayyam was placed in 2001. The statue was installed with the support of the Iranian Embassy following a visit by an official from that country. Inside the park, there is also a statue complex consisting of four pieces, a work by sculptor George Apostu.

On 27 April 2000, the Romanian Infantry Monument was inaugurated. Created in bronze by sculptor Ioan Bolborea, it stands on the site of a previous infantry monument from the interwar period, which was demolished by Ion Antonescu under pressure from Hitler.

== Transportation ==
The park is serviced by Piața Victoriei metro station, with access to Line M1 and Line M2.
