= Bordei Park =

Park in Bucharest, Romania

Coordinates: 44.47227°N 26.09080°E

Bordei Park (Romanian: Parcul Bordei) is a small park in Sector 1 of Bucharest, in the northern part of the city. The area has a difficult history, with the status and ownership of the park having changed several times throughout the years.

The terrain where the Bordei Park stands (which included the Bordei Lake and amounted to 0.13 km^{2}) was bought by the Bucharest Municipality from the Marmorosch Blank Bank in 1932 for a price of 16 million lei ($110,000 at the time). The park was officially opened in 1938 by King Carol II of Romania.

In the 1980s, public access to the park was prohibited, with the park being declared a specially protected zone, because it was close to Nicolae Ceaușescu's residence.

After the fall of the communist regime, the area became public property, but in September 2003, the General Council of Bucharest changed the status of the terrain to private property of the municipality and then gave the terrain to Costică Constanda, an entrepreneur who intended to build houses on it.

In June 2007, senator Marius Marinescu forwarded to the Standing Bureau of the Senate a legislative proposal concerning the declaration of public property of Costică Constanda's plot of land, located in Bordei Park, Bucharest. Along with the founder of the law Marius Marinescu, senators Ion Iliescu, former president of Romania and Nicolae Văcăroiu, former prime-minister of Romania and at the time president of the Senate, signed as co-founders. One year later the legislative proposal was also adopted by the Chamber of Deputies, received the green light from the president of Romania, and got published in the Official Gazette of Romania, thus becoming Law #170/2008, regarding the acknowledgement of public utility of Bordei Park.

In 2008, the general councilors of the Capital City Hall approved the entry of the area under the administration of the Directorate of Lakes, Parks and Recreation.

Costică Constanda and the authorities of Bucharest have been involved in ongoing litigation for years, with Constanda claiming he had not received sufficient financial compensation from the authorities. In 2022, the mayor of Bucharest, Nicușor Dan, announced that he had signed an agreement with the Constanda family, on behalf of the municipality, and will pay in installments approximately 125 million euros to the Constanda family.
