= Bag pula-n lume și v-o fac cadou =

"Bag Pula-n Lume Şi V-o Fac Cadou"

Single by B.U.G. Mafia featuring ViLLy

from the album Înapoi În Viitor
- Released: May 7, 2010
- Recorded: 2010; Ines Sound & Video (Bucharest, Romania)
- Genre: Hip hop
- Length: 7:13
- Label: Casa Productions
- Songwriter(s): V.Irimia, D.Vlad-Neagu, A.Demeter, V.Sterian
- Producer(s): Tataee

B.U.G. Mafia singles chronology
| "Supranatural" (2010) | "Bag Pula-n Lume Şi V-o Fac Cadou" (2010) | "La Fel De Prost Ca Tine" (2010) |

"Bag Pula-n Lume Şi V-o Fac Cadou" (Fuck The World, You Can Have It Back) is the second single by B.U.G. Mafia from their ninth studio album, Înapoi În Viitor. It was released on YouTube and the group's official website on May 7, 2010. The song is produced by Tataee.

== Background ==
The song was recorded in early 2010, with Tataee producing the vocals and sound engineer Cristi Dobrică mixing and mastering the track for commercial release. Former Casa Productions artist Grasu XXL originally came up with the concept of the song but he soon came to realize that the idea was not well suited for his style so he traded it to B.U.G. Mafia's producer, Tataee, in exchange for the title and concept of the "Legendele" (The Legends) song, which appeared on his debut solo album, "Curaj" (Courage), in 2006.

== Content ==
"Bag Pula-n Lume Şi V-o Fac Cadou" contains a sample from Valeriu Sterian's "Amintire cu Haiduci" (Outlaw Memory) song. A portion of Sterian's song was re-recorded by former Casa Productions artist ViLLy and used as the chorus. The lyric "Unde-s pumnalele, unde-s pistoalele, caii şi flintele haiducilor?" (Where are the outlaws' daggers, where are the guns, their horses and their flints?) was the starting point for a politically charged song that expressed the frustration of the Romanian people living through the late-2000s recession. Reminiscent of the group's 2003 single, "Româneşte" (In Romanian), which was an anti-government rant, "Bag Pula-n Lume Şi V-o Fac Cadou" had a significant success in Romania, gathering over eight million views on YouTube.

== Track listing ==
Digital single

| No. | Title | Writer(s) | Producer(s) | Length |
|---|---|---|---|---|
| 1. | "Bag Pula-n Lume Şi V-o Fac Cadou" | V.Irimia, D.Vlad-Neagu, A.Demeter, V.Sterian | Tataee | 7:13 |
