= King Michael I Park =

Public park in Bucharest, Romania

- Parcul "Regele Mihai I"
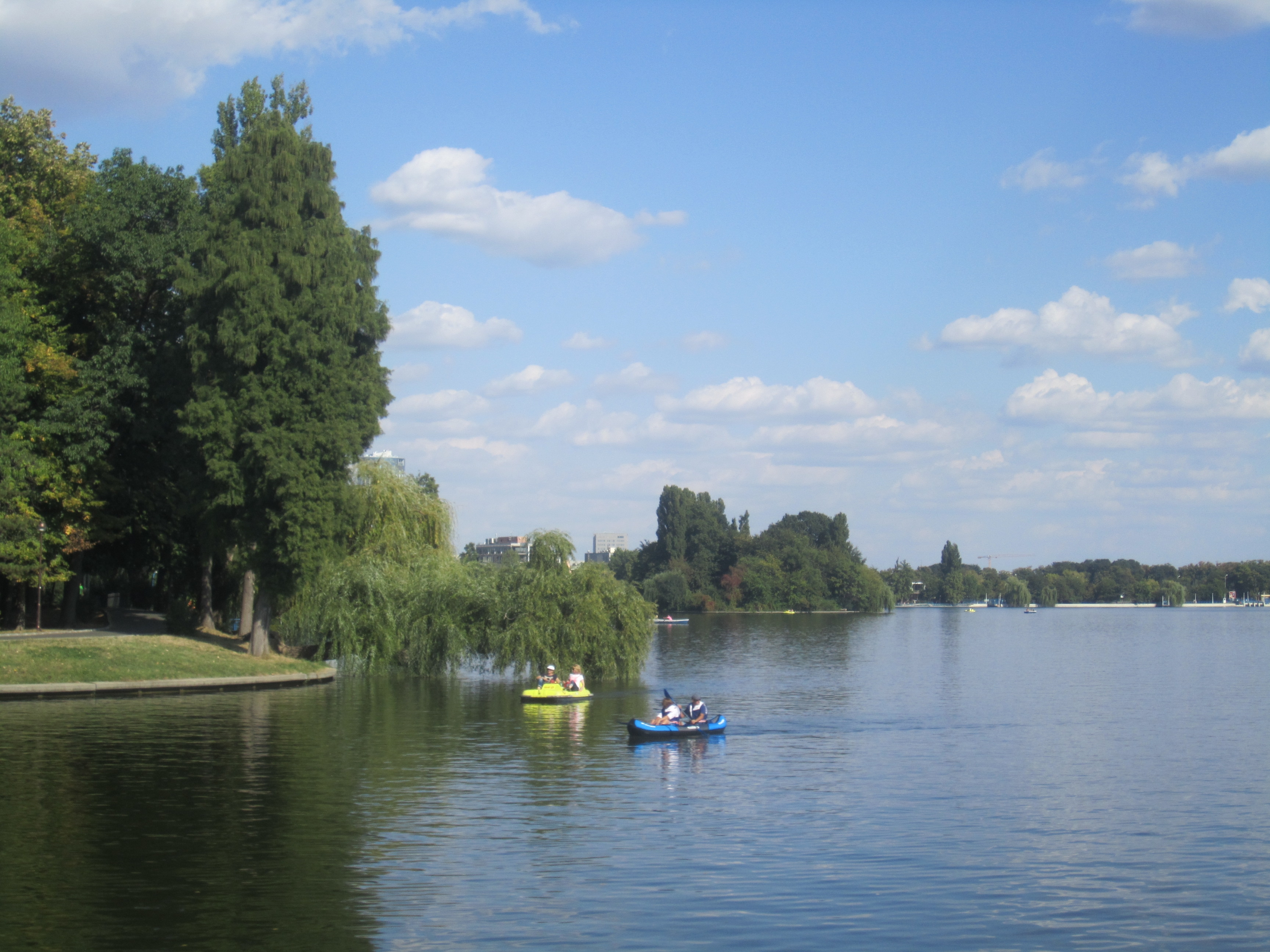
- View from the park towards the House of the Free Press

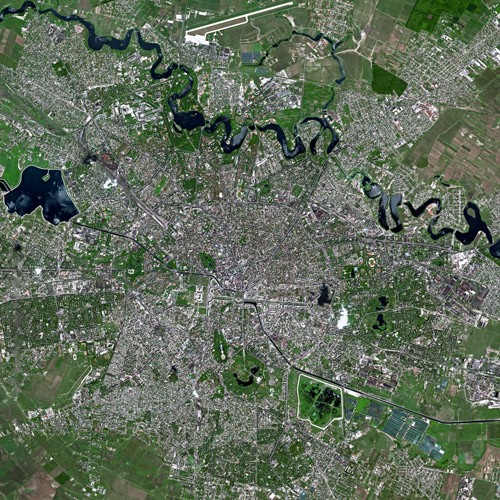
- Location within Bucharest, Romania
- Location: Bucharest, Romania
- Coordinates: 44°28′41″N 26°04′53.1″E
- Area: 187 hectares (460 acres)
- Established: 1936
- Administrator: Administraţia Lacuri, Parcuri şi Agrement București
- Status: Open all year
- Designers: Ernest Pinard, Rebhun. Fr. Rebhun and Octav Doicescu
- Website: herastrauparc.ro

King Michael I Park (Romanian: Parcul "Regele Mihai I"), formerly Herăstrău Park (Romanian: Parcul Herăstrău), is a large park on the northern side of Bucharest, Romania, around Lake Herăstrău, one of the lakes formed by the Colentina River.

== Geography ==
The park has an area of about 187 ha, of which 74 ha is the lake. Initially, the area was full of marshes, but these were drained between 1930 and 1935, and the park was opened in 1936. The park is divided into two zones: a rustic or natural zone (the Village Museum), which is left more or less undisturbed, and a public/'active' domain with open areas for recreation activities. Small boats are allowed on the lake.

== Name ==
The park was initially intended to be called National Park (Parcul Național), but it was renamed Parcul Carol II during the period of the Carol II of Romania's cult of personality. Following World War II, it was renamed Parcul I. V. Stalin, featuring a statue of Stalin at its entrance. In 1956, during the de-Stalinization period, Stalin's statue was torn down and the name of the park was changed to "Herăstrău". The name Herăstrău referred to the Herăstrău lake, and has its origin in a dialectal version of the word ferăstrău in standard Romanian, meaning saw or sawmill, referring to the water-powered sawmills that were once found on the Colentina river which flowed through it.

On 19 December 2017, by a decision of the Bucharest General Council, the park was renamed to "King Michael I Park" to honor the former King of Romania after Michael I had died on 5 December 2017.

== History ==
The area of the park has been inhabited since the Paleolithic, traces of settlements being found at the Herăstrău sand quarry, including flint tools made by the Mousterian culture, a culture generally associated with the Neanderthals. During the quaternary glaciation, the area was inhabited by large mammals such as the woolly rhinoceros and the mammoth, bones of the latter being found in the Herăstrău sand quarry.

During the Iron Age, a settlement of the first part of the Hallstatt era belonging to a pastoral population was located in Bordei-Herăstrău (the area between Herăstrău and Floreasca lakes, today part of the Herăstrău Park), which gives the name of the culture (Bordei-Herăstrău culture). In the Dacian settlements of Herăstrău, which has been dated, with the help of the coins, to the 1st century BC, archeologists found a treasure containing silver fibulae, silver spiral bracelets, a silver bowl, as well as Ancient Greek coins (from Tomis and Dyrrachium) along with Dacian imitations.

Prince of Wallachia Alexander Ypsilantis built an Ottoman-style pavilion on the banks of the Herăstrău Lake. The plain along the lake was used in 1831, during the Russian occupation, for military exercises by a joint force of the Wallachian and Russian militaries. By the mid-19th century, Herăstrău was the main promenade area used by the Romanian élite for walks.

In 1936, the work began for the creation of the National Park (Parcul Național) in Herăstrău. For this, several dozen squalid houses, as well as an industrial plant were expropriated and torn down, being replaced with alleys and trees, being finally open for the public in May 1939, becoming Bucharest's largest park.

== Buildings and facilities ==
Elisabeta Palace, the current residence of the Romanian Royal Family, is located in the park, as an "island" inside the Village Museum, near Arcul de Triumf. The Dimitrie Gusti National Village Museum, an open-air museum showcasing traditional life of the Romanian peasant and having hundreds of houses from across Romania, is also one of the main attractions in the park.

Scattered across the park are an open-air theatre, a yacht club, a sports club, the Herăstrău Hotel and, adjunct to the park, the Diplomatic Club, featuring a golf course. There is also Berăria H, the largest beer hall in southeastern Europe (formerly Pavilion H, a Soviet-style building); its capacity is of 2,000 places inside and 1,000 on an outside terrace.

== Gallery ==
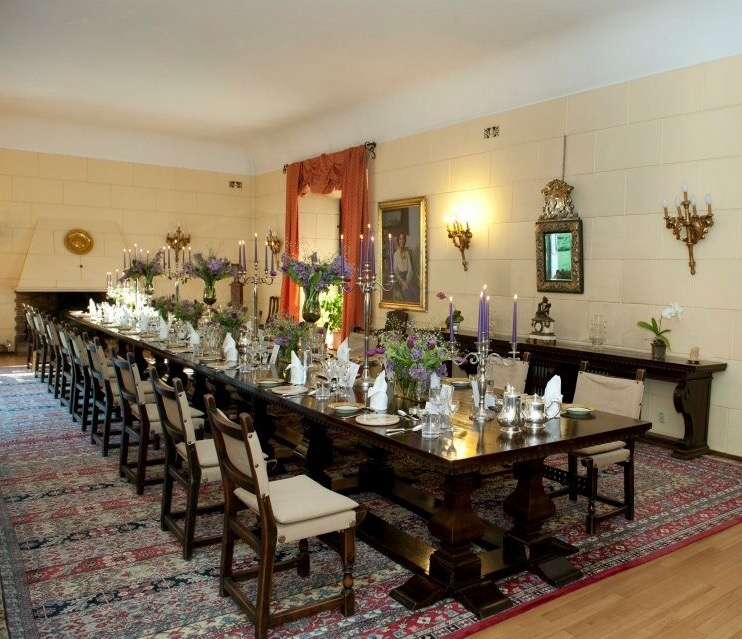
Elisabeta Palace

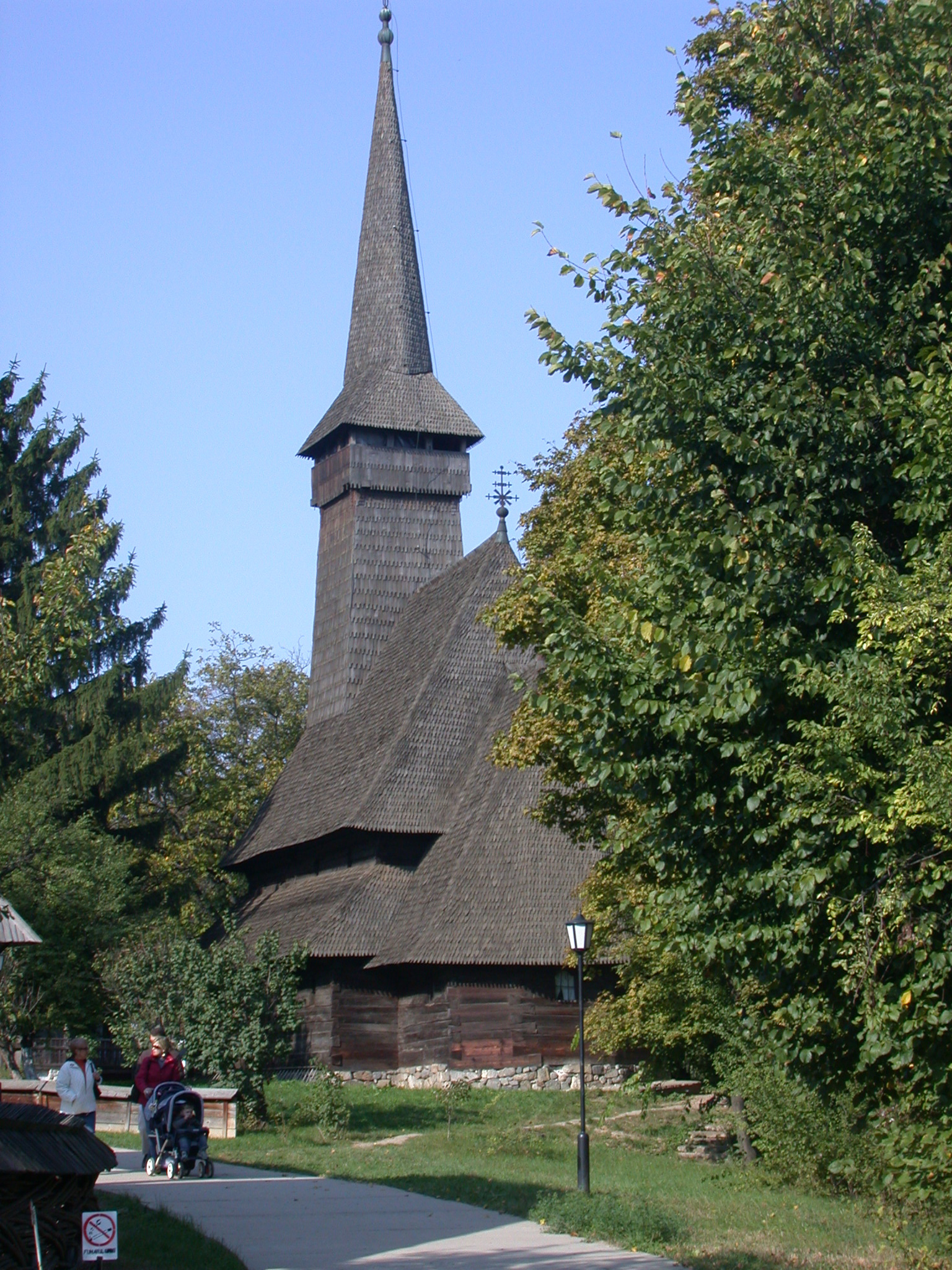
Village Museum

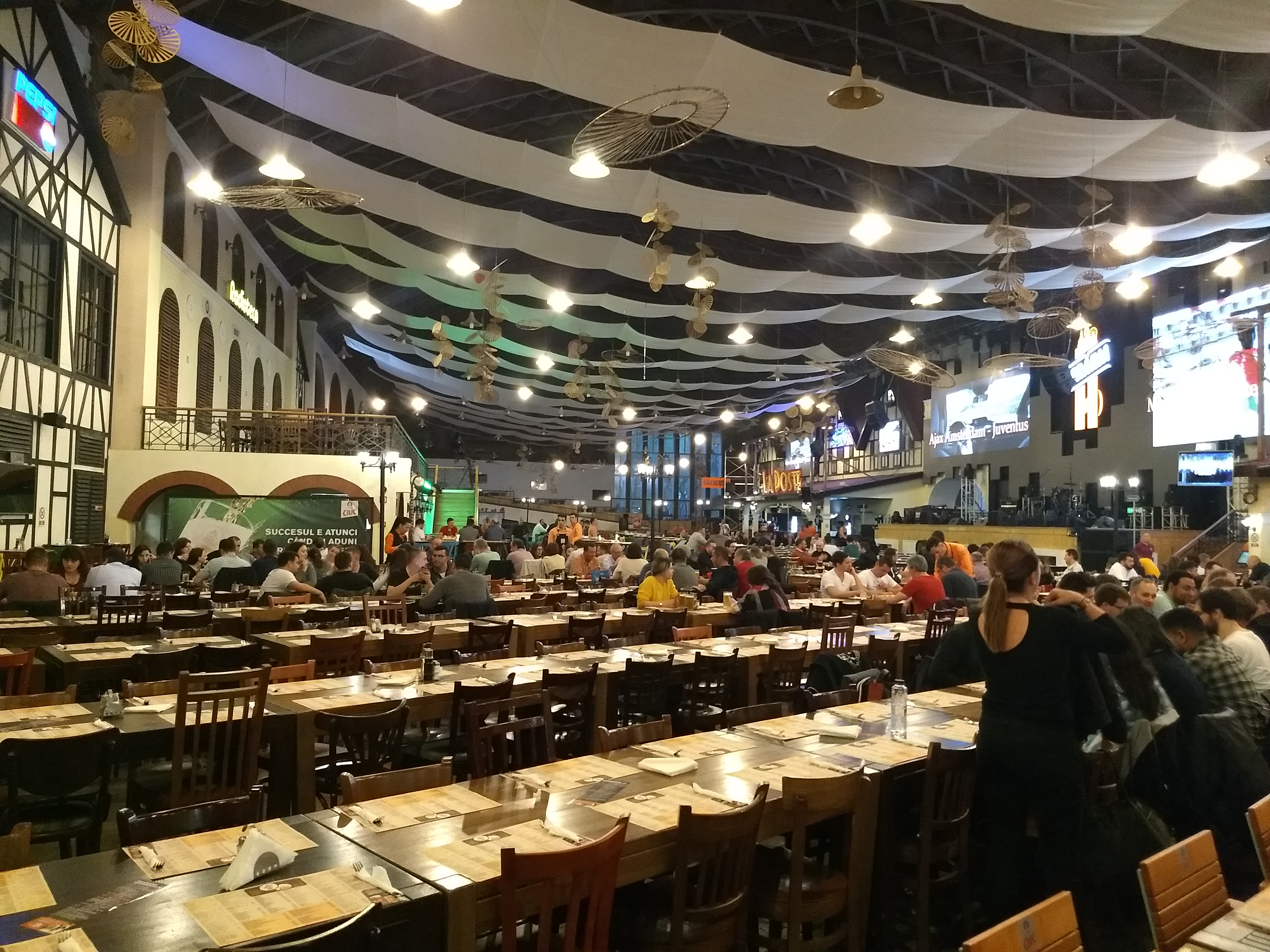
Berăria H Beer Hall

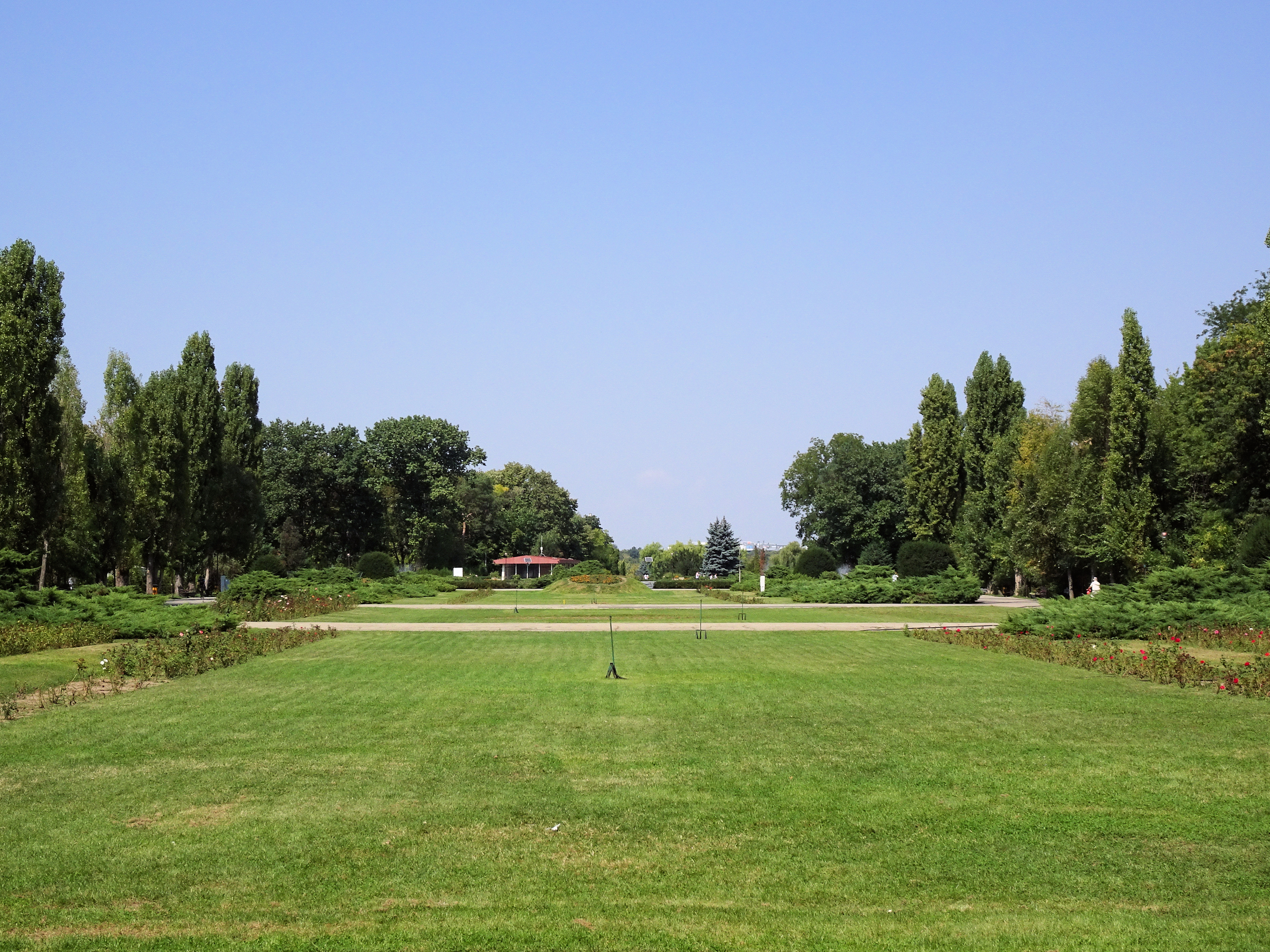
Green lawn

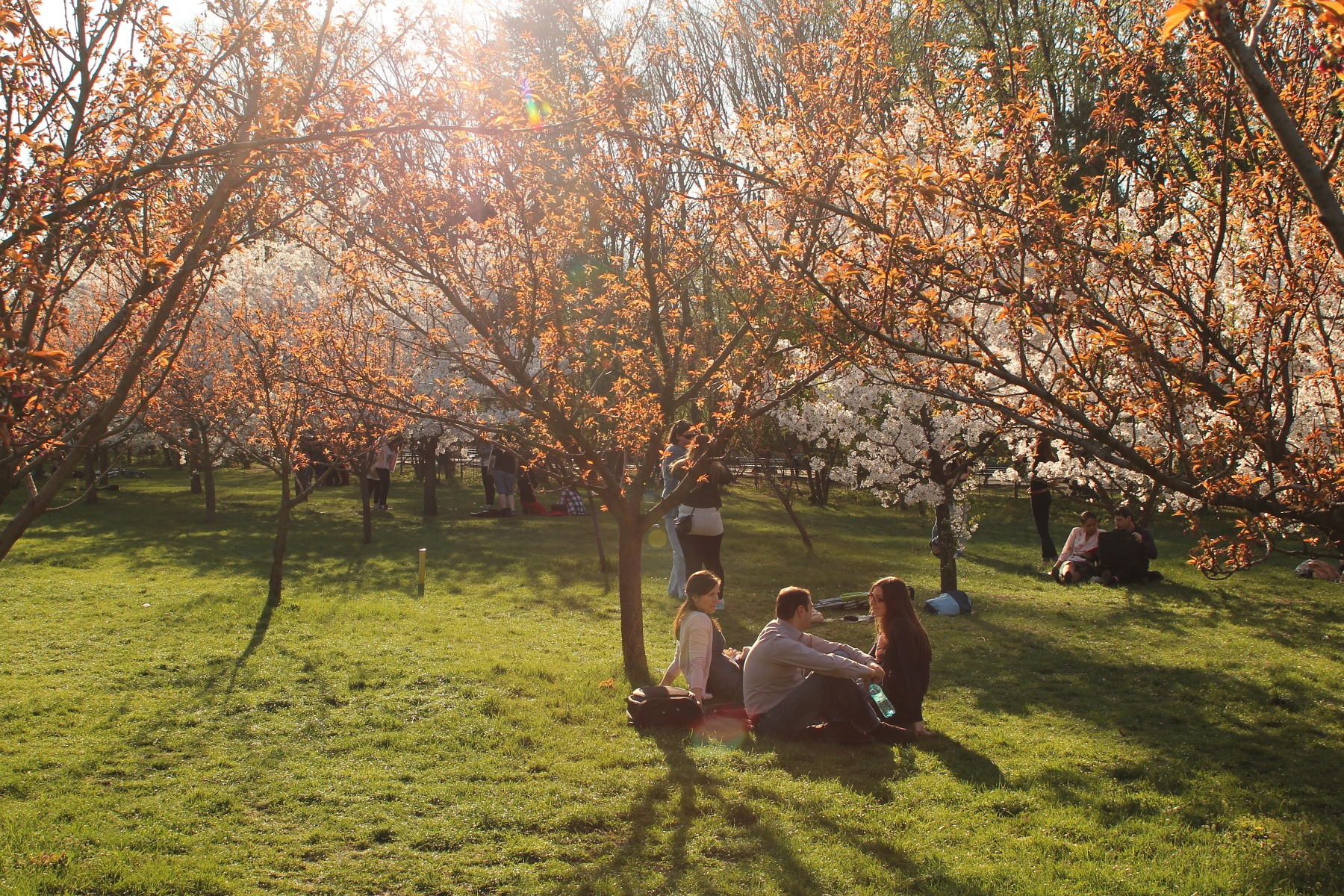
Japanese Garden

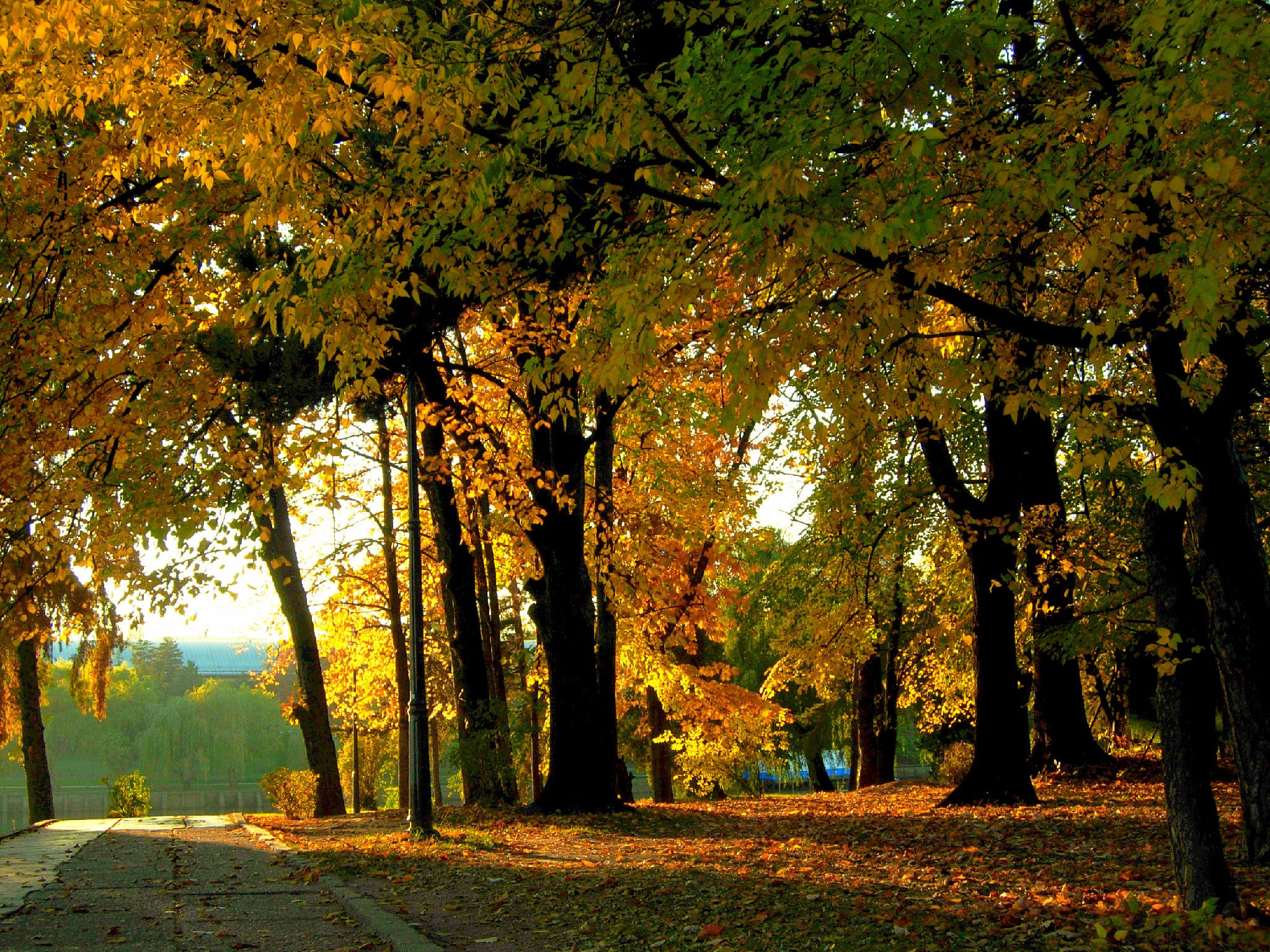
Alley in Herăstrău Park in autumn

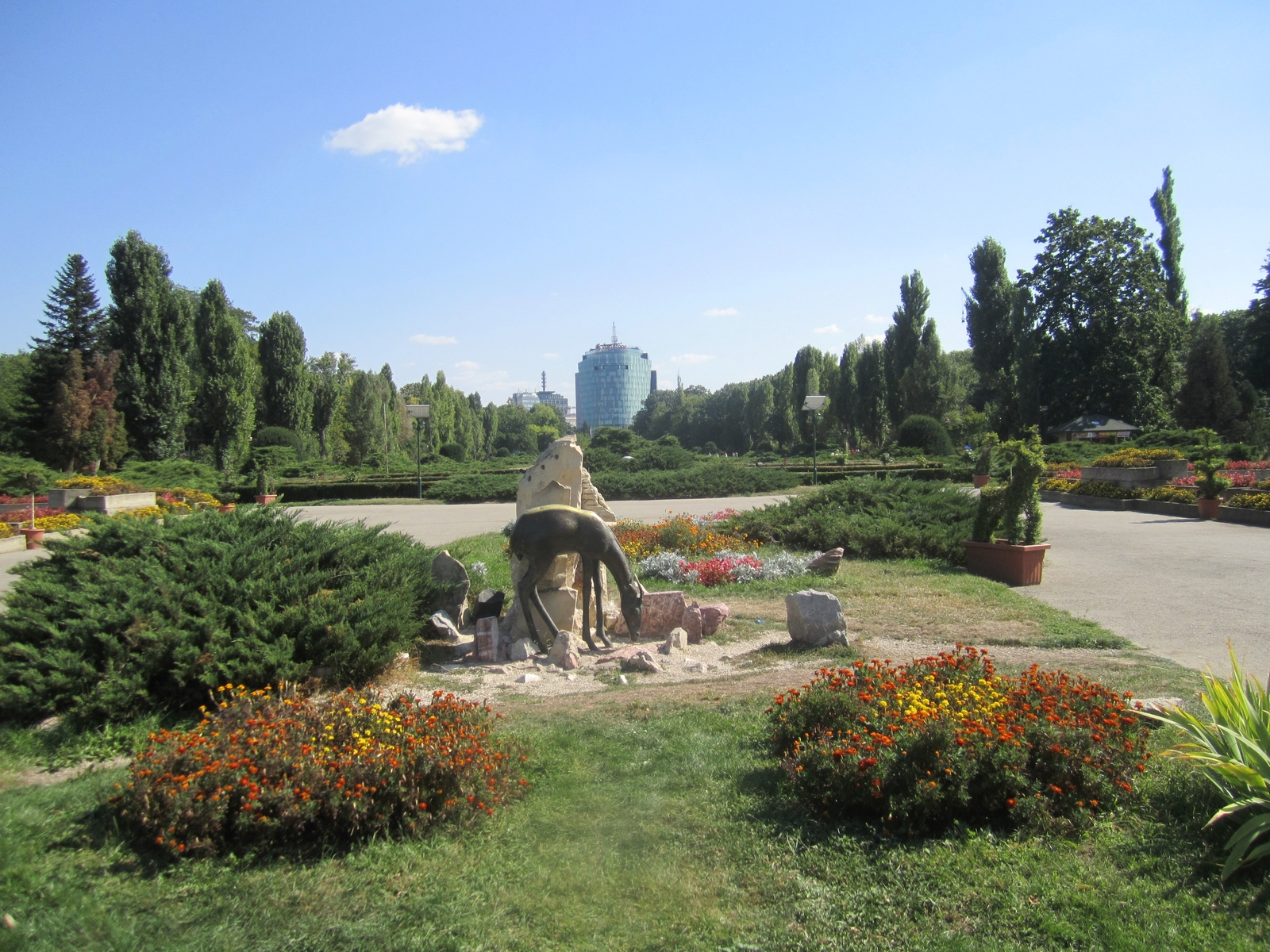
Sculptures

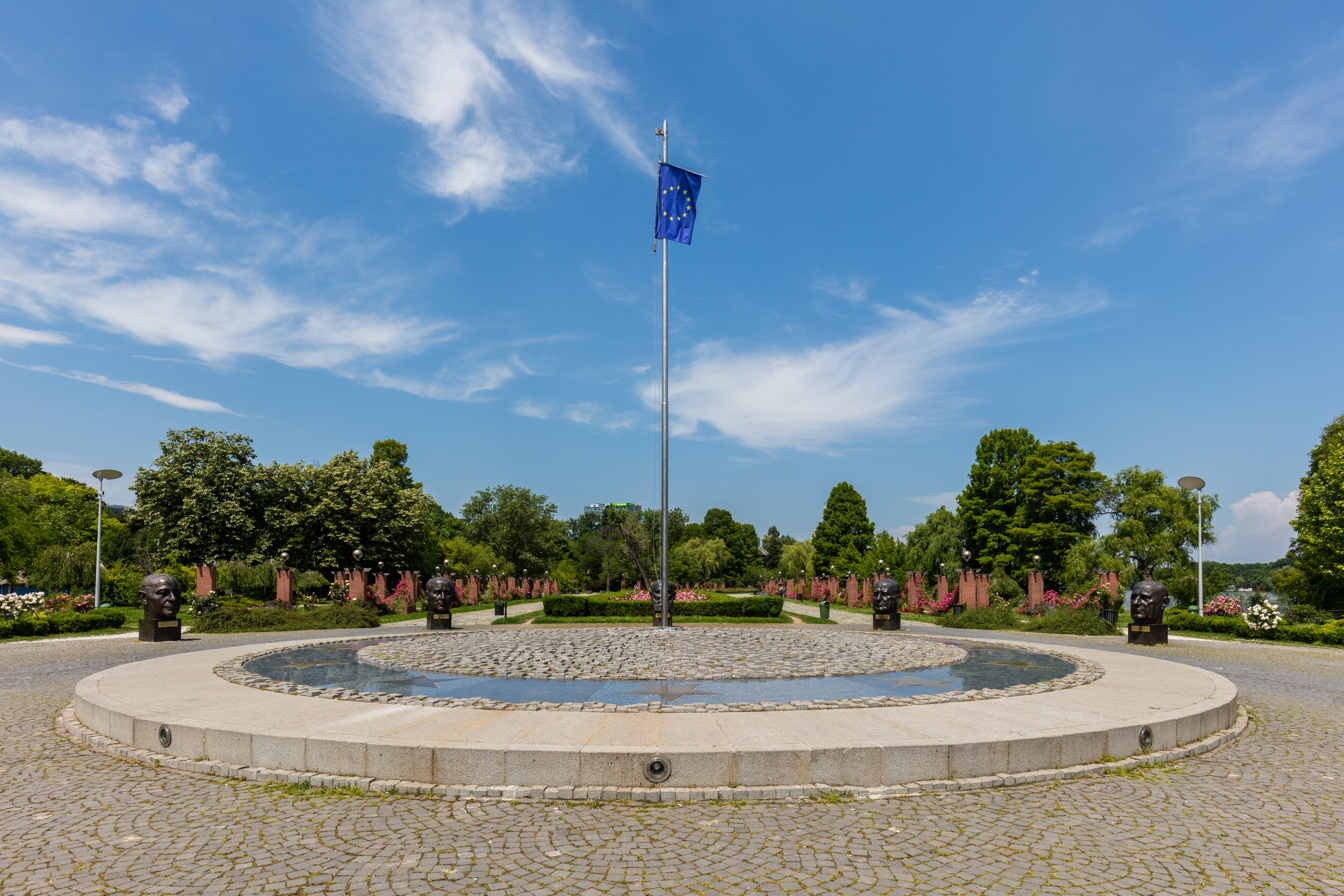
Monument to the Founders of the EU

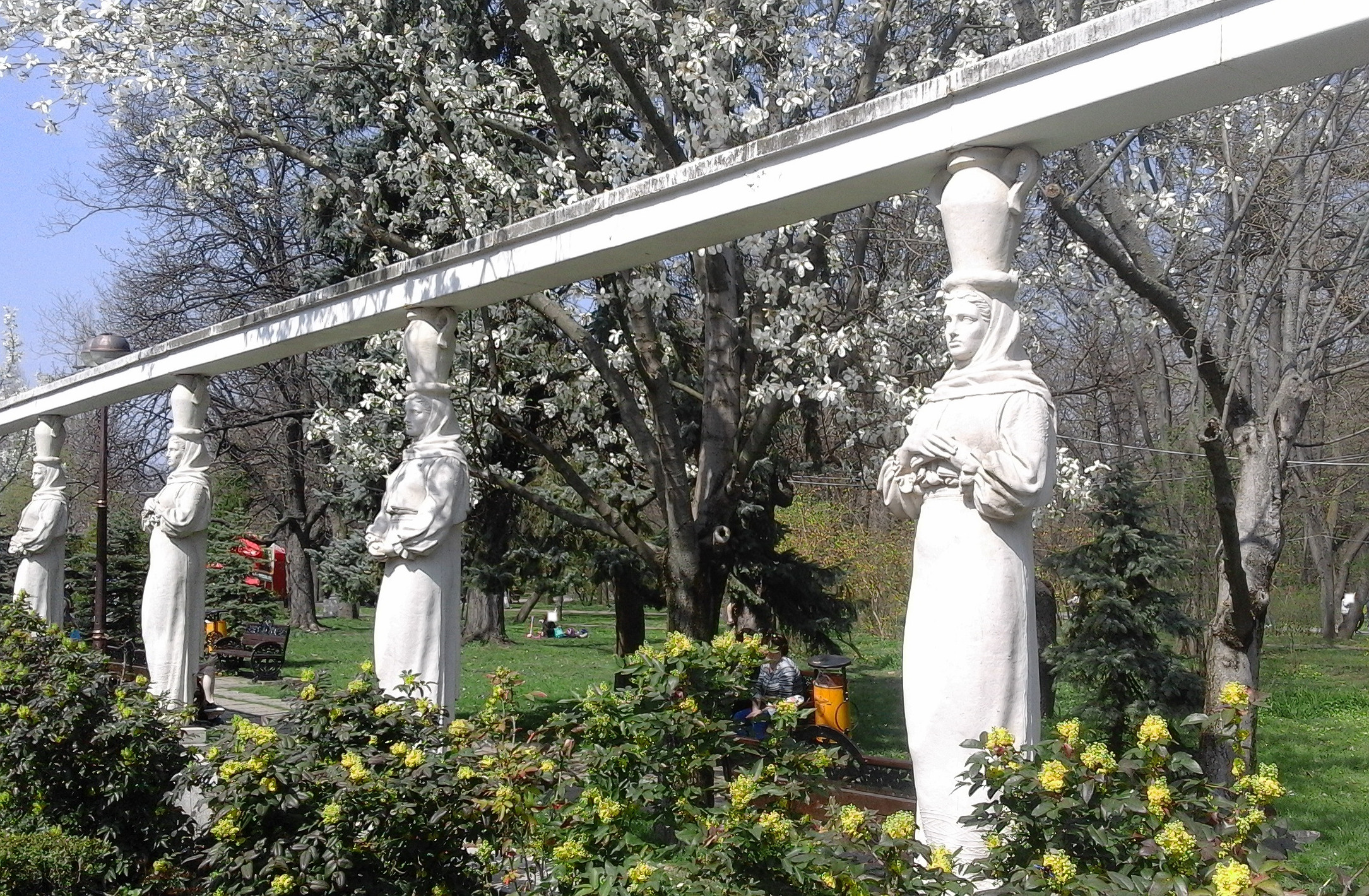
Charles de Gaulle entrance

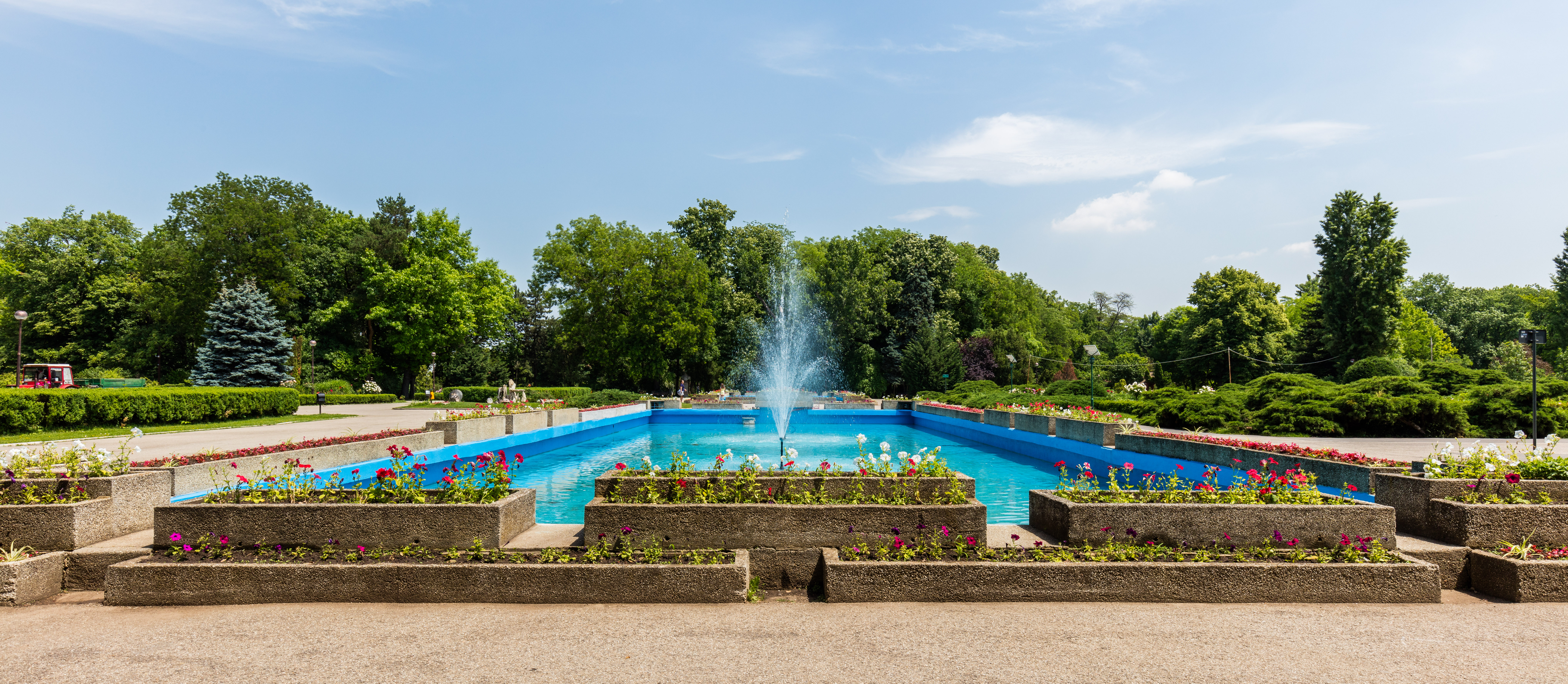
Fountains and gardens

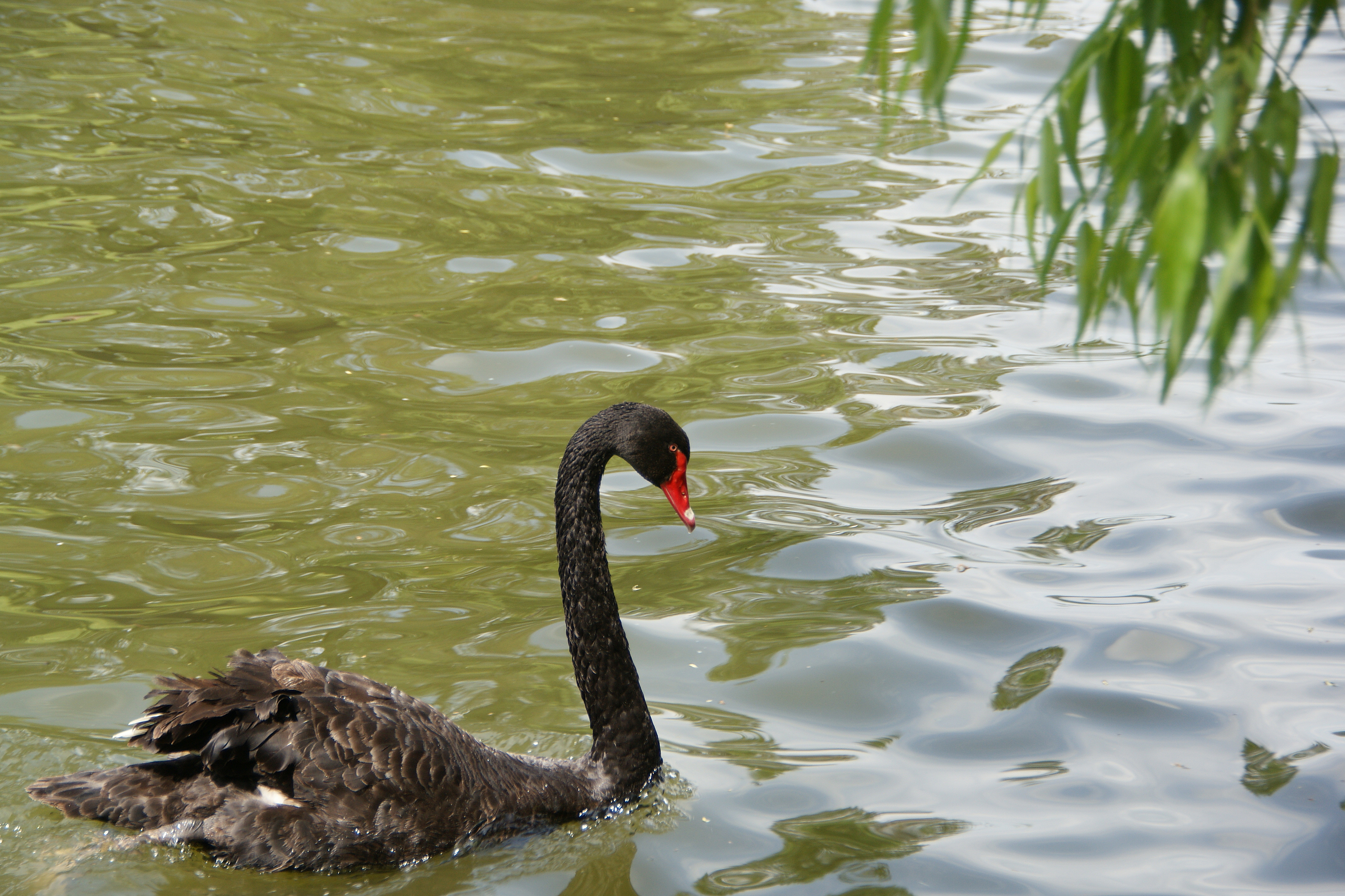
Black swan

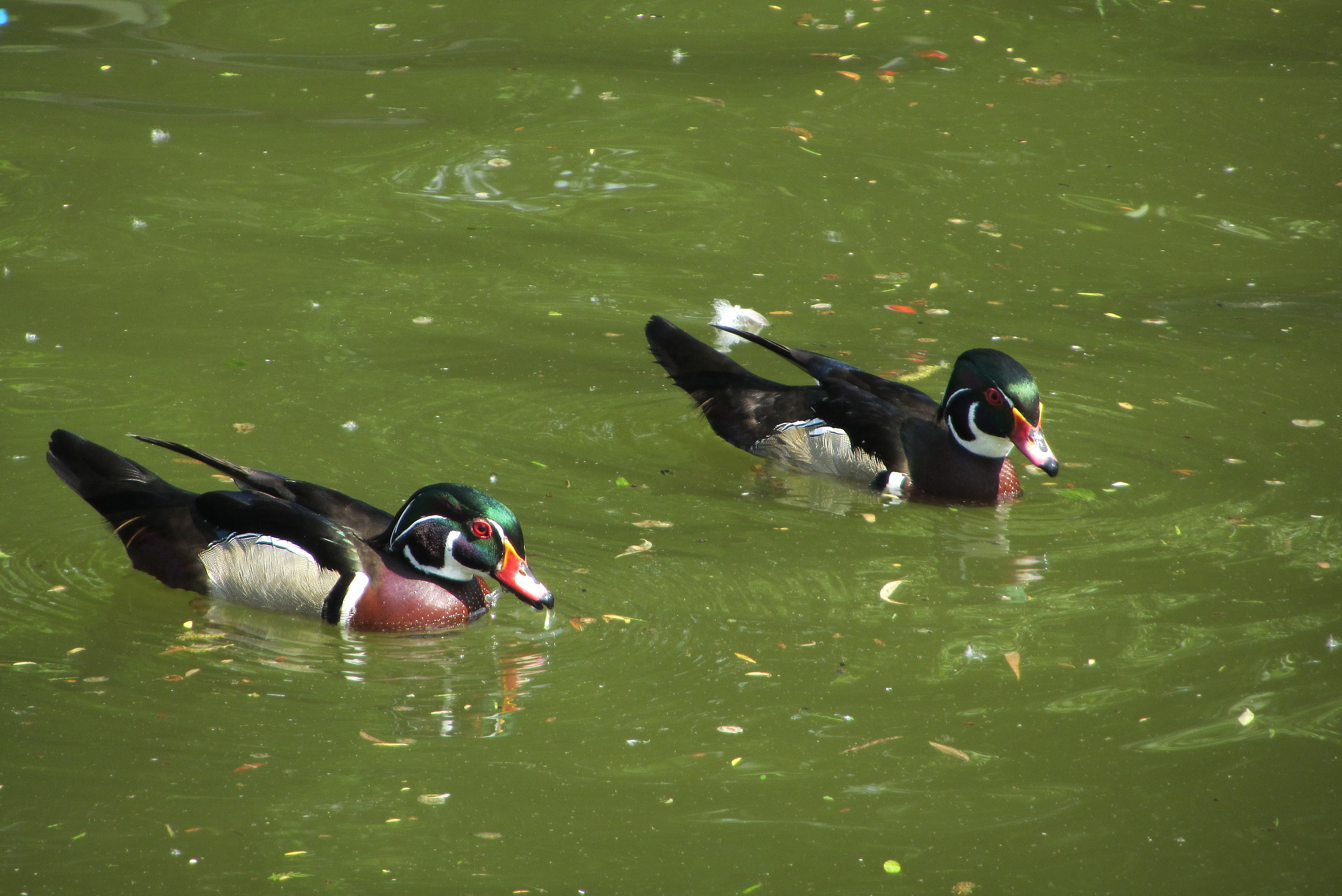
Carolina ducks

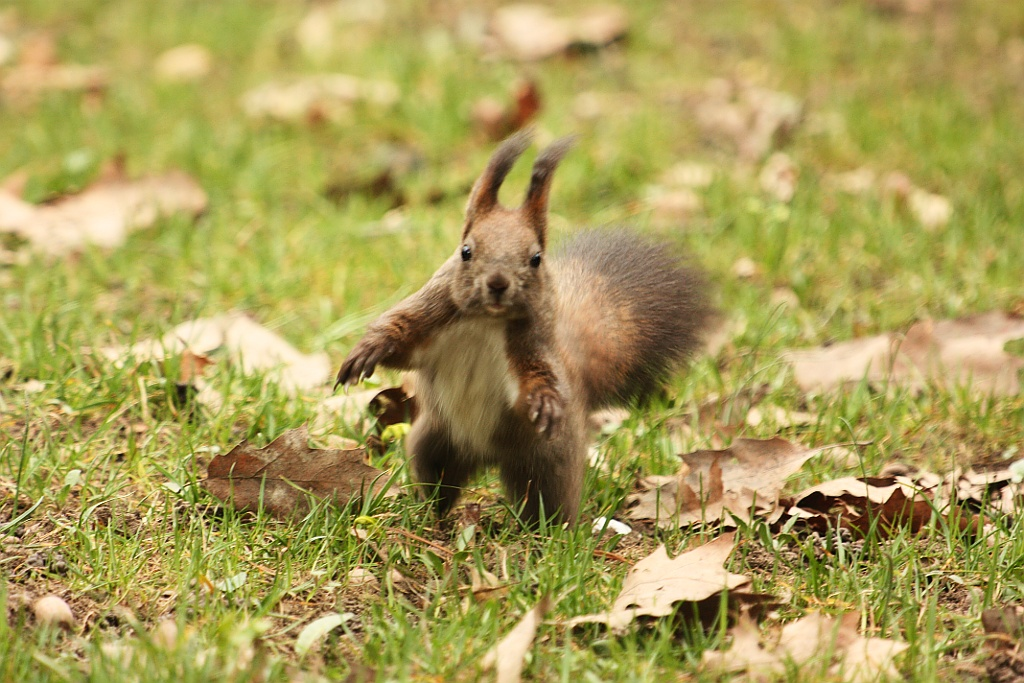
Squirrel

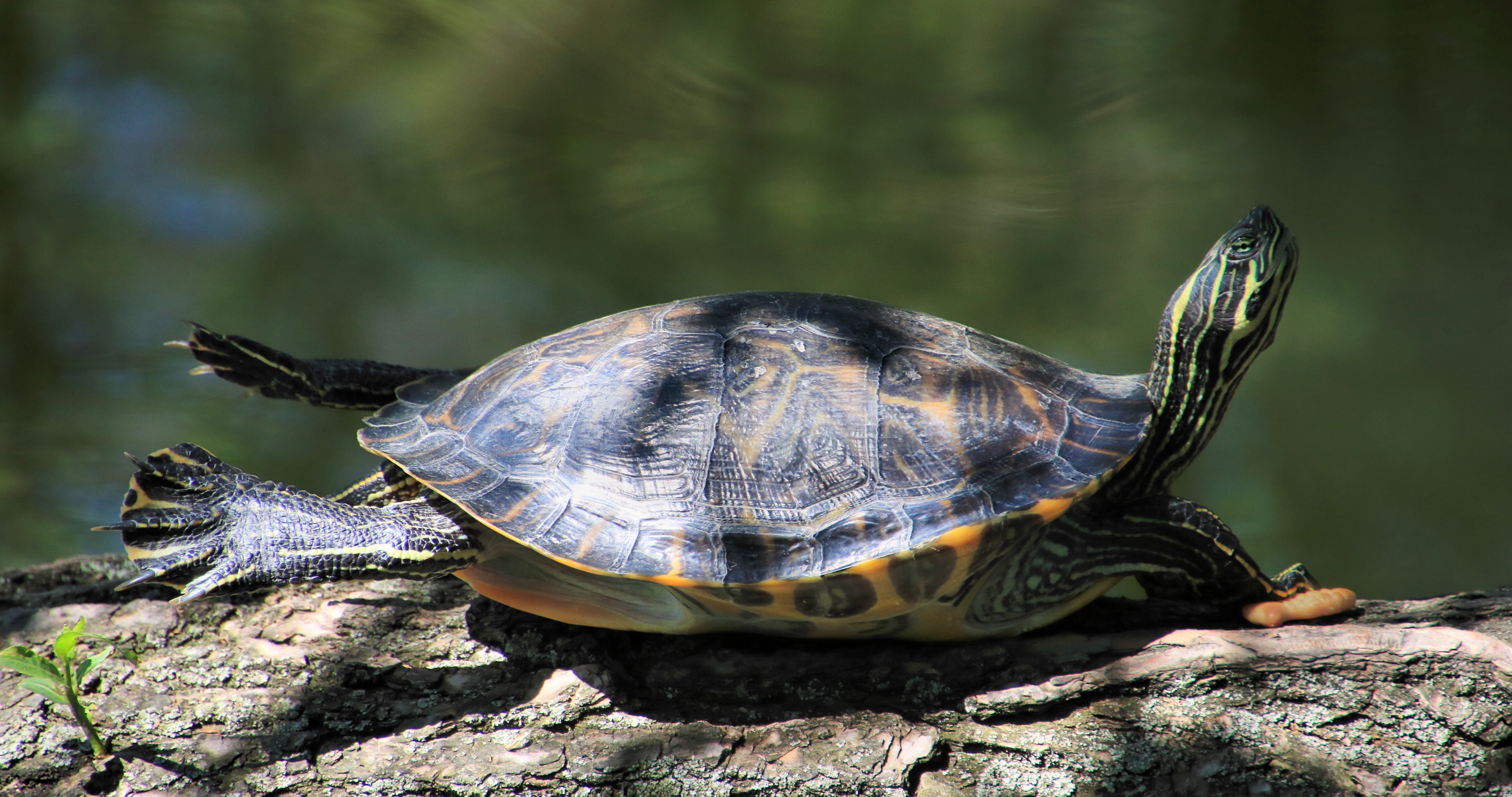
Turtle

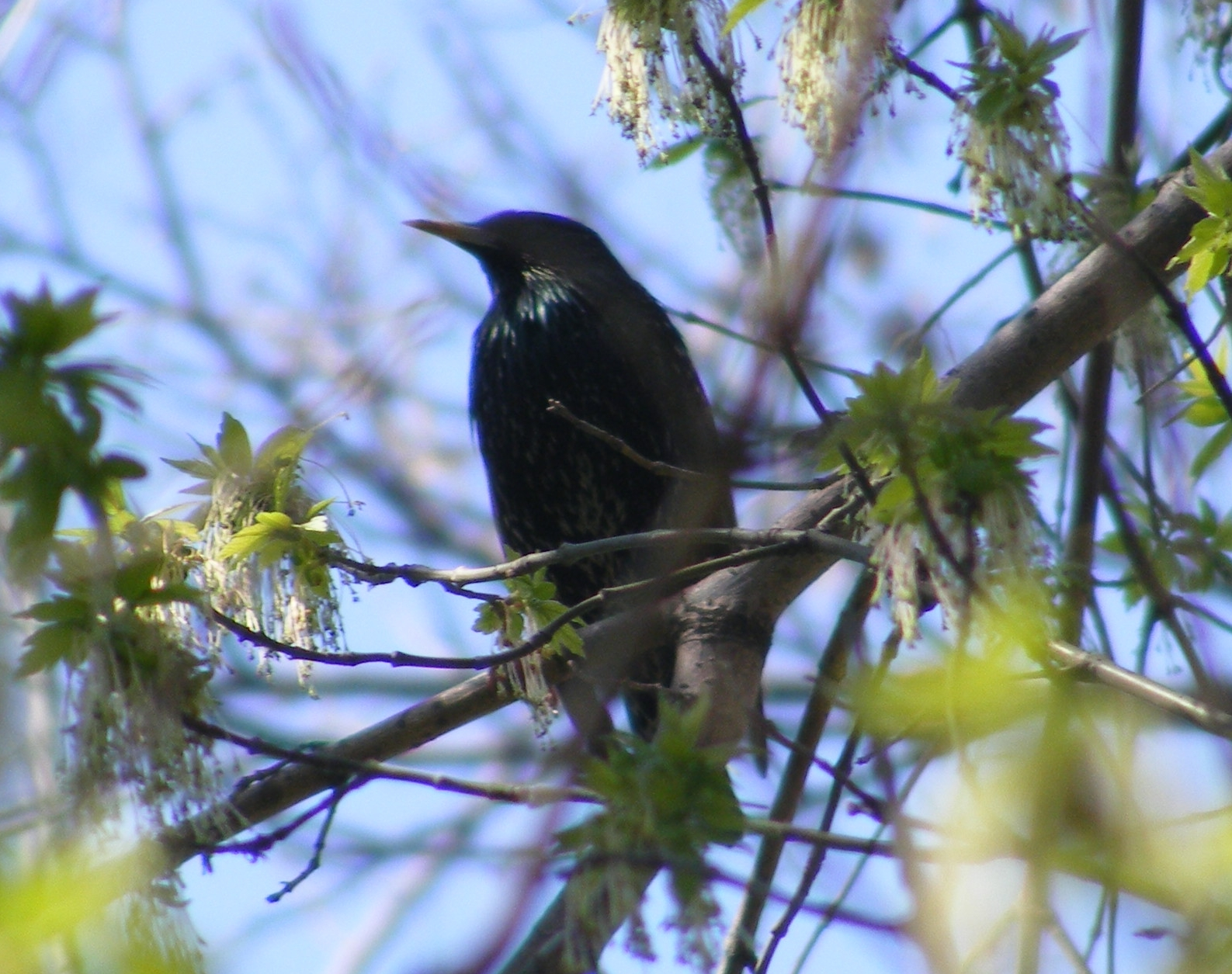
Blackbird

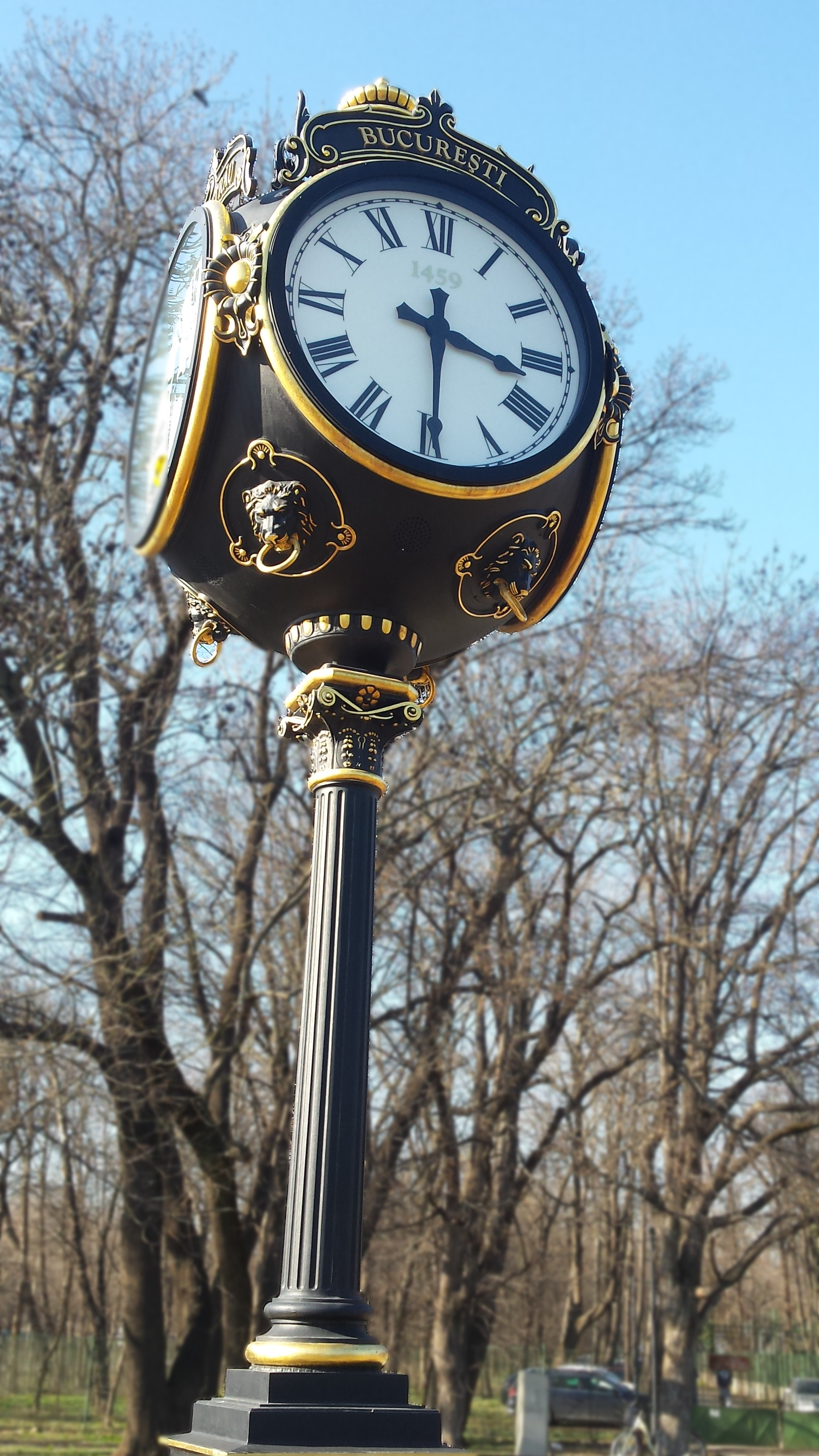
Public clock

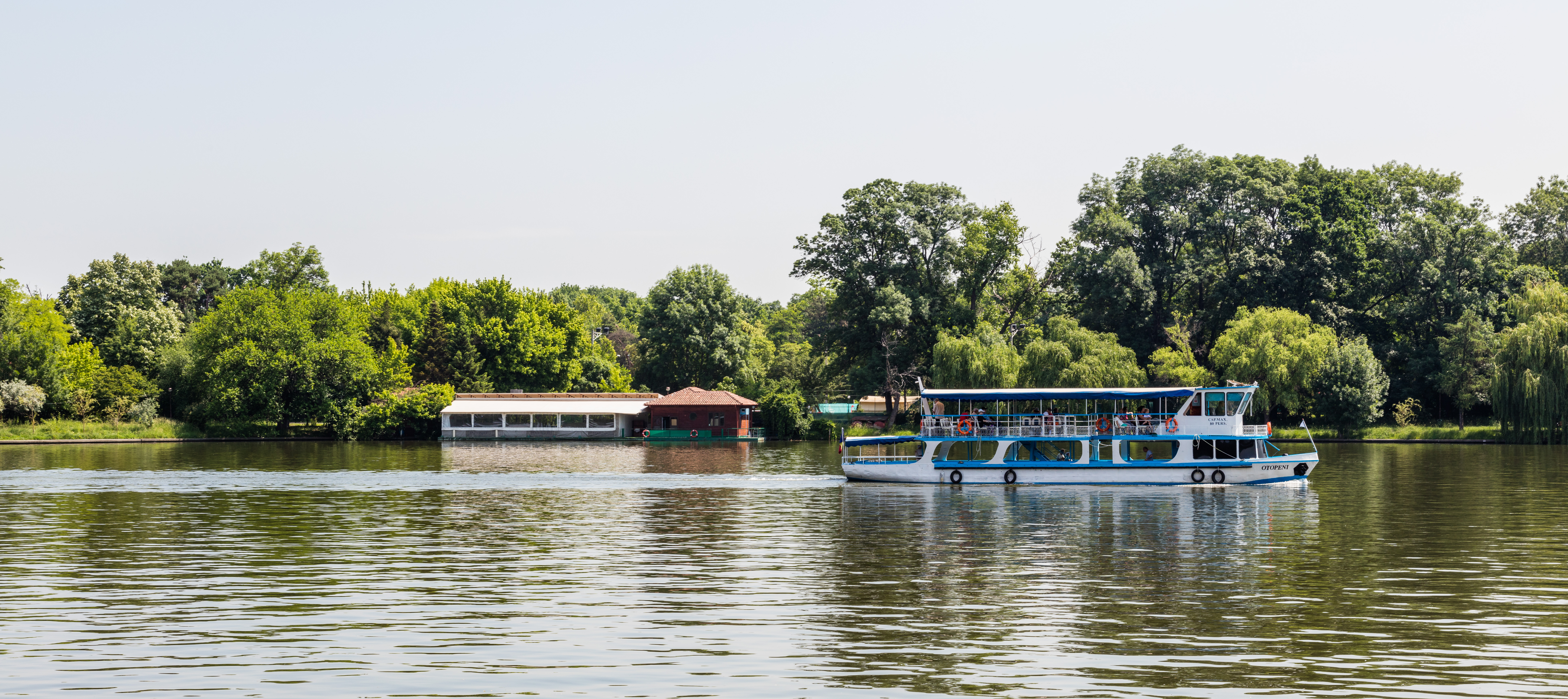
Public transport with boats

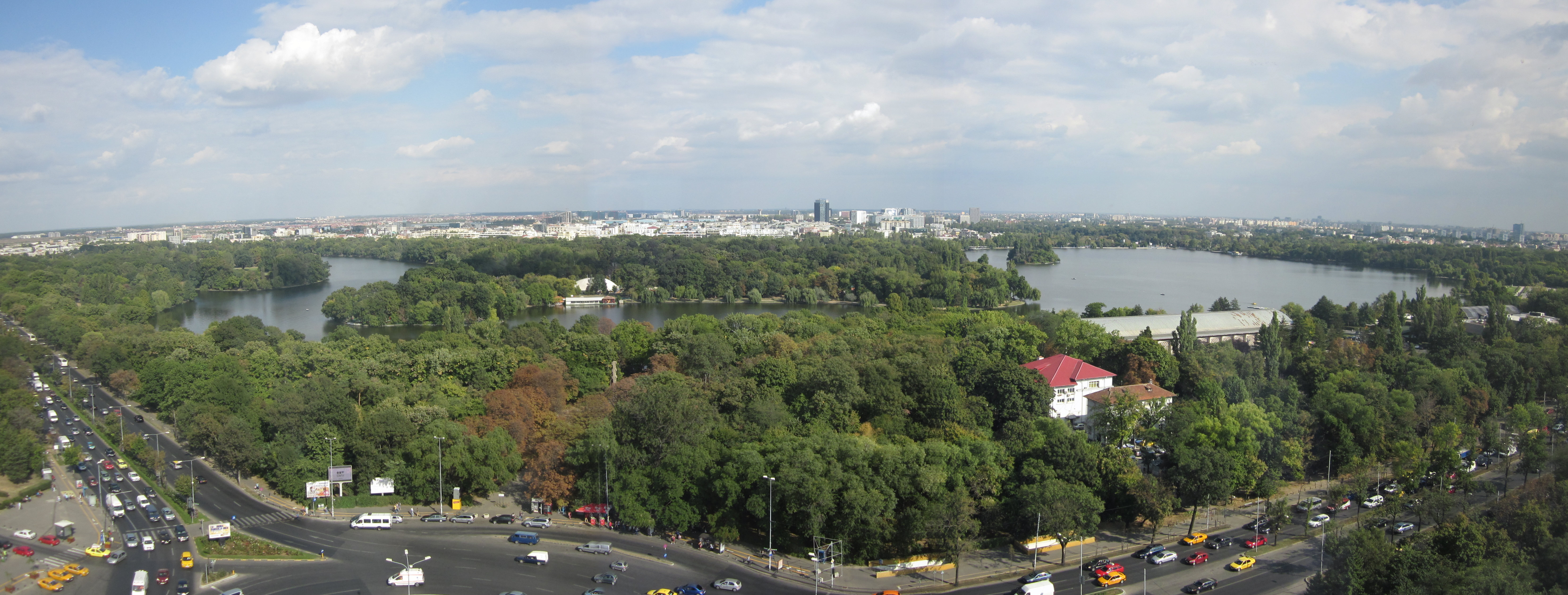
Panoramic view of Herăstrău Park

== See also ==
- List of sculptures in Herăstrău Park
