= Marin Preda Park =

Park in the north-west of Bucharest, Romania

Coordinates: 44.4612°N 26.0421°E

Marin Preda Park (Romanian: Parcul Marin Preda), formerly known as Giulești Park (Romanian: Parcul Giulești), is a park in the north-west of Bucharest, Romania. It is named for the Romanian novelist, post-war writer and publisher Marin Preda. Opened in 2017, the park is located in Sector 6 of the city and covers an area of 4 hectares (9.9 acres).
