= Edmond van Saanen Algi =

Romanian architect

Edmond van Saanen Algi (c. 1 November 1882 – 2 May 1938) was a Romanian architect, painter, and stage designer.

== Personal life ==
Van Saanen Algi was the son of Robert van Saanen, a founding member of the Romanian Orthodox Church, and Louise Bruzzesi. Though the name Van Saanen is of Dutch origin, his family had left Hoorn as early as 1710. His grandfather, Pierre Edmond van Saanen (born 1813, in Smyrna), had arrived in Wallachia during Gheorghe Bibescu's reign (between 1843 and 1848) and had started a dynasty active in business and the arts. His mother's family had been active in the unification of Italy before moving to Bucharest.

Edmond's parents divorced and his mother remarried Alexandru Algi (from whom Edmond obtained a longer surname), and not much later Constantin C. Arion, a former foreign affairs minister and a distinguished intellectual. After finishing his studies at the Munich Polytechnicum Edmond went to study for 10 years at the École nationale supérieure des Beaux-Arts.

Van Saanen Algi married Aurelia Vasiliu-Bolnavu, the daughter of Romanian philanthropist Constantin N. Vasiliu Bolnavu. Later (before 1914), he was married to the New York-born author Marice Rutledge, who from 1915 to 1918 wrote under the name "Marie Louise van Saanen".

== Career ==
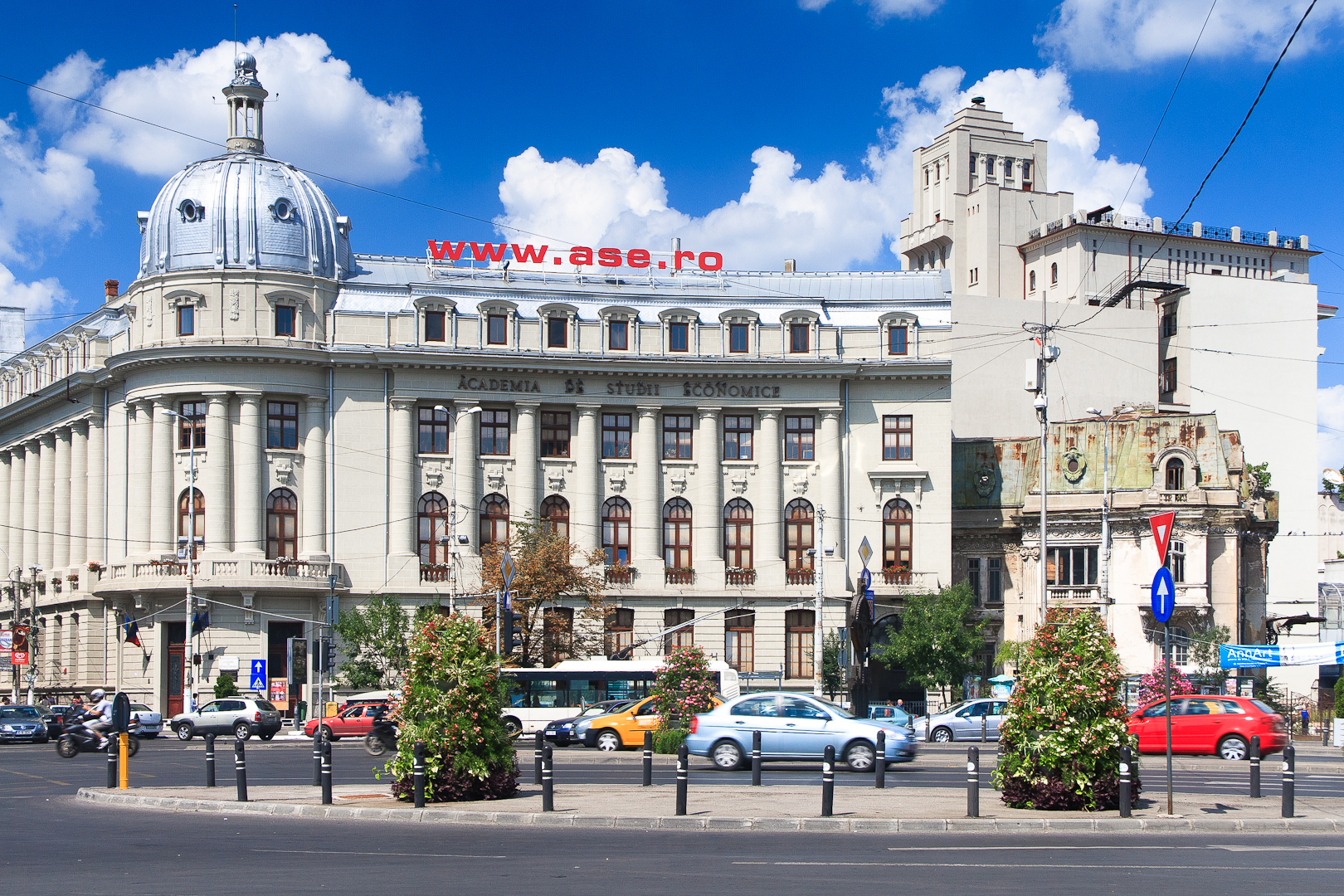
Bucharest Academy of Economic Studies in Piața Romană, Bucharest, Romania, by Grigore Cerkez and Edmond van Sannen Algi, 1916-1926

Telephones Company Building on Calea Victoriei, Bucharest, 1929-1934, by Walter Froy, Louis S. Weeks and Edmond van Saanen Algi

He was the author of major architectural works in Bucharest: the Academy of Economic Studies building, the Istrate Micescu villa overlooking Cişmigiu Gardens, and Palatul Telefoanelor (with American architects Louis S. Weeks and Walter Froy).

As an artist, he is known for his drawings of famous dancers, such as Vaslav Nijinsky, Isadora Duncan and Anna Pavlova.
