= Statue of Trajan and the She-wolf =

Statue in Bucharest

Coordinates: 44°25′53″N 26°5′49″E

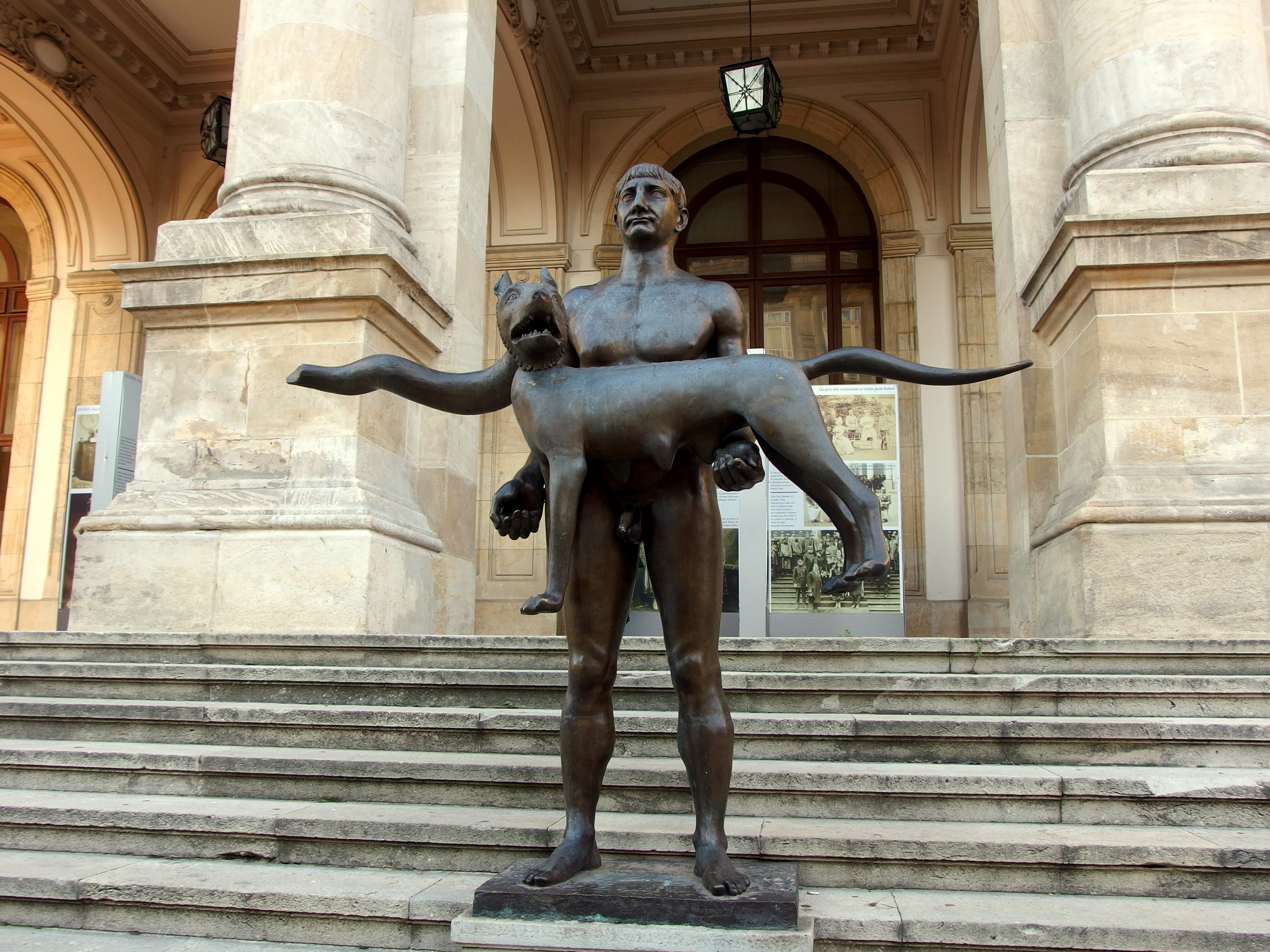
- Artist: Vasile Gorduz
- Year: November 2011 (installed); April 2012 (unveiled)
- Type: bronze sculpture
- Dimensions: 215 cm (85 in)
- Location: Bucharest
- Owner: Bucharest Municipality

The Statue of Trajan and the She-wolf is a statue by Vasile Gorduz that was once located on the steps of the National Museum of Romanian History on Calea Victoriei in central Bucharest. It depicts a nude Trajan holding in his arms the Capitoline Wolf, which is doubled as the Dacian Draco, the war standard of the Dacians.

== Description ==
The 2.15 metres (7 ft 1 in) high statue is made out of bronze and has a weight of 500 kilograms (1,100 lb). The cost of the statue was around 200,000 lei (45,000 €) The artist created three copies of the sculpture: another is located in Sevilla, Spain, on the banks of the Guadalquivir, and another in Rome, in front of Accademia di Romania.

The sculpture depicts Trajan, the Roman emperor who conquered Dacia, the province located in today's Romania and considered one of the "parents" of the Romanian nation. In his arms, in fact appearing to levitate above his arms, is the Capitoline Wolf, the she-wolf in the founding myth of Rome. The head of the wolf is joined to the tail of a Dacian Draco.

== History ==
The statue was created at the initiative of the Bucharest City Hall as part of a larger program of city's administration called "Calea Victoriei – Cultural Trail", being recommended to them by Răzvan Theodorescu.

It is based on a plaster model made by Gorduz, currently owned by Artmark Galleries, while the bronze cast was made by artist Ioan Bolborea. The statue was installed in November 2011, but it was covered with plastic foil and it was only unveiled on April 29, 2012 by Sorin Oprescu, the Mayor of Bucharest.

== Reception ==
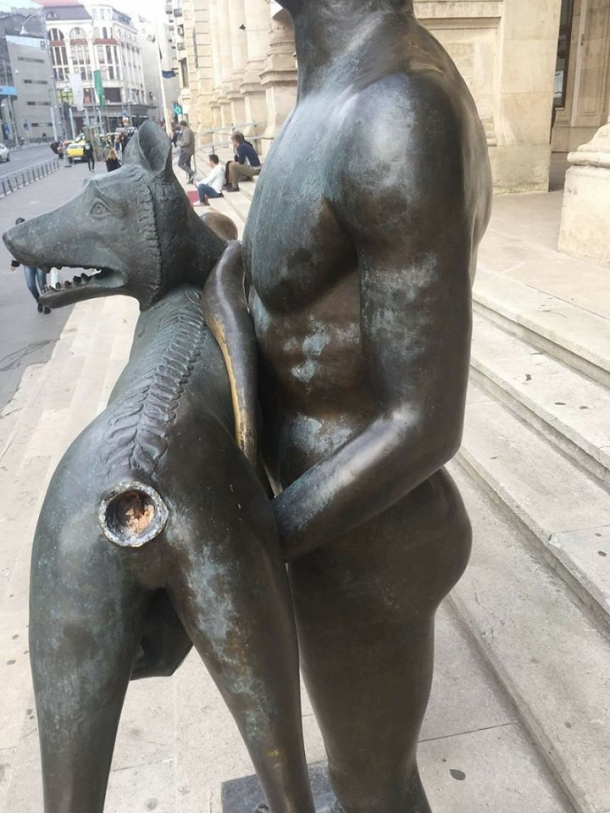
The statue, after being vandalized in September 2017

The director the National Museum of Romanian History, Ernest Oberländer Târnoveanu, said he thinks it shouldn't have been placed there due to its "doubtful artistic quality", and appreciated that it won't stay there for a long time. On the other hand, Mihai Oroveanu, the director of the National Museum of Contemporary Art thought it's a "beautiful" and "very modern" work, while Răzvan Theodorescu called it a "symbol of our nation".

The statue was not well received by Bucharesters, who met it with derision, due to the nudity and the awkwardness of Trajan's statue, being described as "a monument to Romania's stray dogs", with commentators wondering why "the dog is levitating", and why the animal wears a scarf "while the emperor isn't even wearing any underwear".

According to Deutsche Welle, the Bucharest public met it with a "stubborn conservatism which opposes any attempt towards urban renewal", still displaying the stupefaction of the first visitors to modernist exhibitions.
