= Joffre cake =

Chocolate buttermilk layer cake

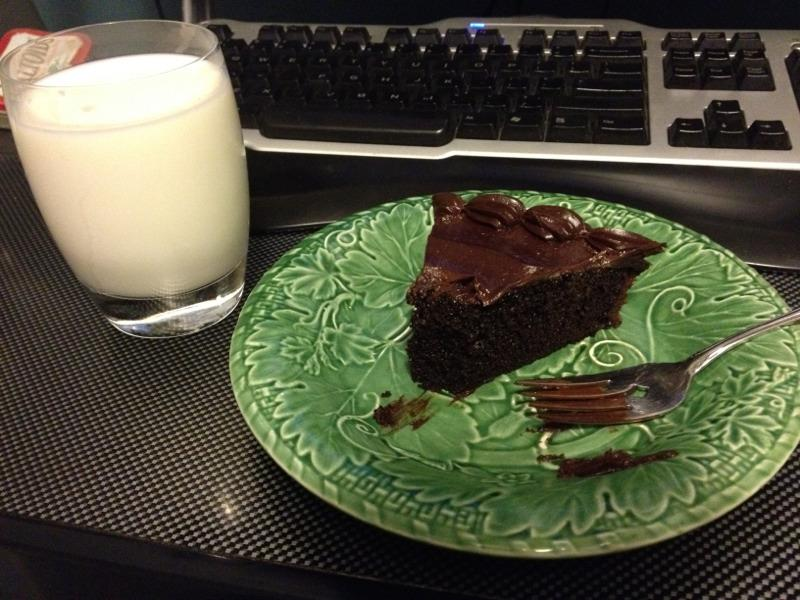
- A slice of a Joffre cake
- Type: Cake
- Course: Dessert
- Place of origin: Romania
- Region or state: Bucharest
- Created by: Casa Capșa
- Main ingredients: Buttermilk, chocolate, buttercream

A Joffre cake (Romanian: prăjitură jofre) is a chocolate buttermilk layer cake filled with chocolate ganache and frosted with chocolate buttercream originally created at Bucharest's Casa Capșa restaurant, in honor of a visit by French Marshal Joseph Joffre, shortly after World War I. The cake is said to have been devised so as to be suitable for diabetics, as Joffre was diabetic. The cylindrical shape suggests the French military cap.
