= Zlătari Church =

Heritage site in Bucharest, Romania

Coordinates: 44°25′57.1″N 26°05′50.5″E

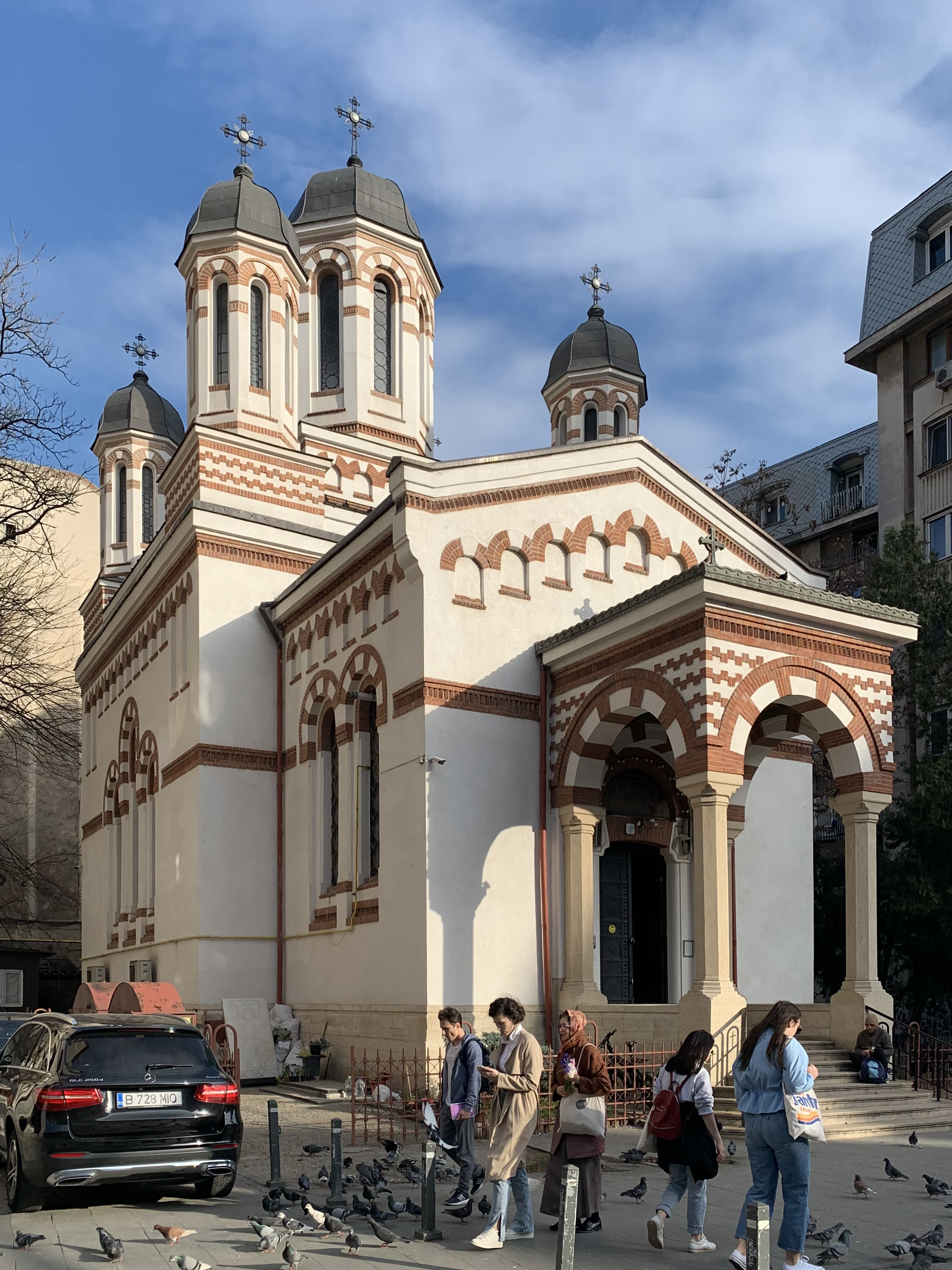
Zlătari Church

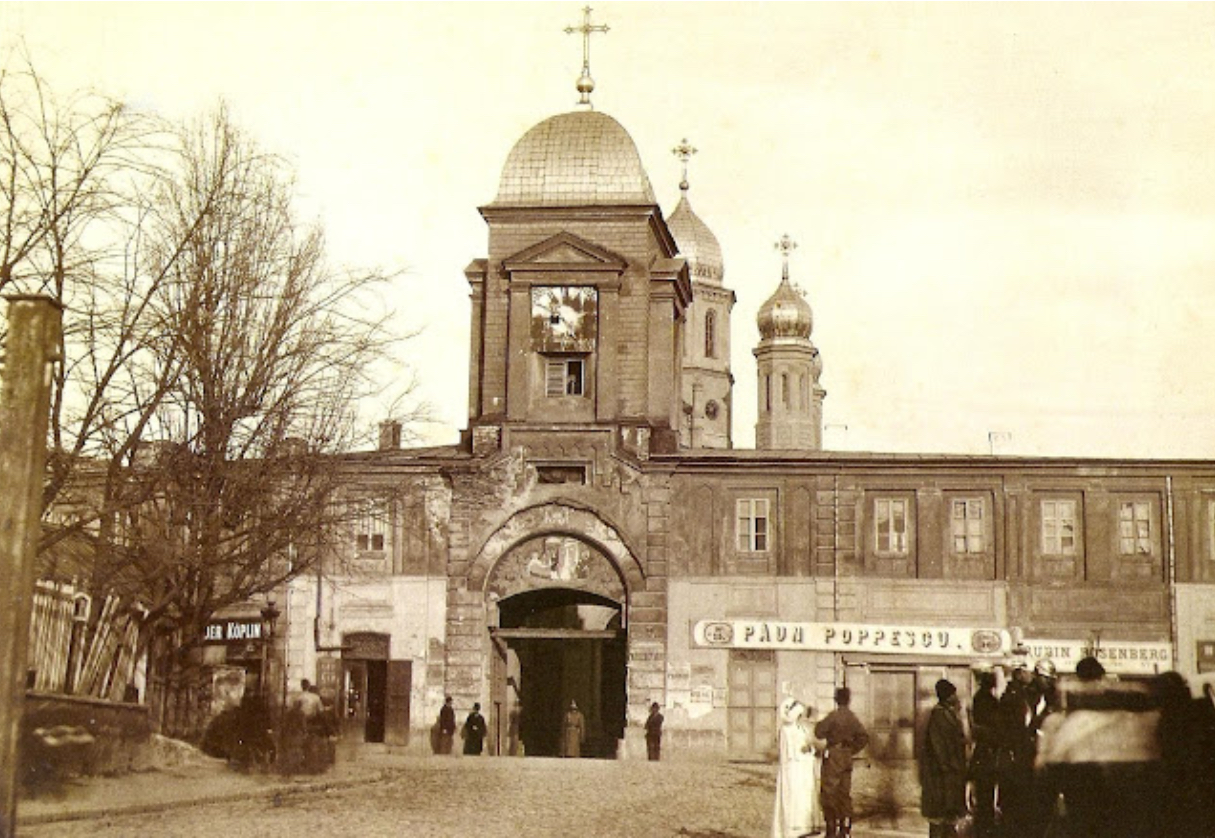
An 1871 photograph of the inn and bell tower, demolished in 1903

The Zlătari Church (Romanian: Biserica Zlătari) is a Romanian Orthodox church located at 12 Calea Victoriei in the Lipscani district of Bucharest, Romania. It is dedicated to the Nativity of Mary.

Reportedly, the first church on the site was built in the mid-17th century, likely of wood, and is mentioned in a 1667 document. Legend has it that the founders were zlătari, gold or silversmiths. The 1709 pisanie was lost in 1850, but a likely apocryphal record of its Greek text was preserved. According to this source, a new church was built in 1705, with Spătar Mihail Cantacuzino as ktetor. He generously endowed the monastery with stores and estates, making it among the wealthiest in the country during the 18th century. In 1709, when Patriarch of Alexandria Gerasimos Palladas visited the court of Prince Constantin Brâncoveanu, the monastery, and its surrounding inn were subordinated to his church.

The church suffered severe damage during the 1802 and 1838 earthquakes, and was entirely rebuilt starting in 1850, as recorded by the 1860 pisanie, also in Greek; reportedly, Xavier Villacrosse was the architect. The interior painting, dating to 1853–1856, was done by Gheorghe Tattarescu, and features biblical scenes on large panels. The iconostasis, carved in wood and gilt, as well as its silvered icons, are works of art. The monastery chapel, mentioned by Dionisie Fotino in 1818 and used for prayer by Russian travelers, was demolished in 1850. The building underwent repairs in 1864, 1876, and 1898, becoming a parish church in 1888. In 1903, the inn and bell tower were demolished in order to widen the street. A fresco depicting the Nativity of the Virgin and an inscription submitting to Alexandria were discovered at the time, but later lost.

The church was again restored in 1907–1908; its domes were damaged in the 1940 tremor. These were repaired provisionally and given their current form in 1971–1973. Until the late 1970s, the church stood alone between Lipscani and Stavropoleos Streets, with green space covering the inn's foundation. At that point, one apartment block was built on either side.

The single-nave church measures 23.5 meters long by 12 meters wide, finishing in an altar apse. Aside from the central dome, there are four smaller ones atop the nave corners; these are octagonal, resting on square bases. Light comes into the interior through stained glass windows depicting saints. Two brass candelabra in Oriental style were donated by the father of a colonel who lived in the inn around 1830. Red bricks decorate the exterior. The canopied portico features arches on stone columns. The right arm of Saint Cyprian the Magician is held in a small reliquary before the altar.

The church is listed as a historic monument by Romania's Ministry of Culture and Religious Affairs.
