= Telephones Company Building =

Coordinates: 44°26′10.66″N 26°5′51.24″E

- Palatul Telefoanelor din București
- Location: Calea Victoriei 37, Bucharest, Romania
- Designer: Louis S. Weeks; Edmond van Saanen Algi; Walter Froy
- Height: 52.5 m
- Beginning date: 1929
- Completion date: 1934
- Style: Art Deco

Telephones Company Building (Romanian: Palatul Telefoanelor) is an Art Deco office building located on Calea Victoriei in Bucharest, Romania. It is now owned by Telekom România.

== Bucharest ==
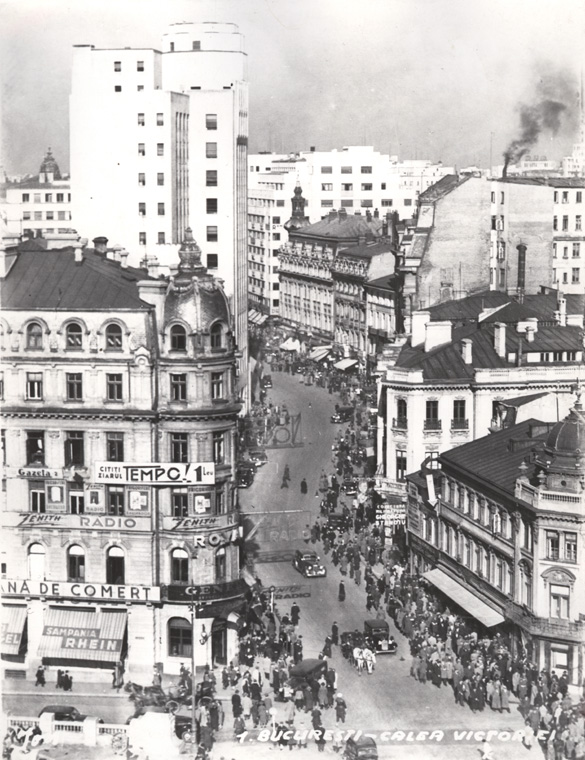
Telephone Palace in 1935

Palatul Telefoanelor in Bucharest is an Art Deco style building and until 1956, was the tallest building in Bucharest at 52.5 metres (172 feet).

The worldwide Great Depression that began with the Wall Street crash of 1929 also affected Romania, strongly impacting the Romanian economy. The Romanian government decided to take a loan from the American trust, J.P. Morgan & Co., which obtained from this transaction the granting of a 20-year monopoly on Romanian telephony to the International Telephone and Telegraph Corporation (ITT), which then formed the Societatea Anonimă Română de Telefoane (SART, "Romanian Telephone Company, Ltd."). The aim was to modernize Romanian telephony and to construct the Telephone Palace.

Designed on behalf of SART by the Romanian architect of Dutch origin Edmond Van Saanen Algi and built over the course of about 20 months in 1931–1933, it was the first major modernist building on Bucharest's Calea Victoriei, the street of which Tudor Octavian wrote, "this is how the whole of Bucharest would look if we had been allowed..., if its builders had been clever enough..." It was constructed on the former site of the Oteteleșanu Mansion, which had been, since the turn of the century, home to a terrace bar (Terasa Oteteleșanu), a coffee house and a beer saloon, competing with Casa Capșa for the custom of Bucharest's elite from its location next to the old Romanian National Theatre.

The steel skeleton was produced by the Reșița steelworks. The building was inaugurated in 1934 in the presence of King Carol II. The building was extended (both vertically and horizontally) in 1940 and 1946, and survived earthquakes in 1940, 1977, 1986, and 1990, as well as bombing in 1944 by Allied Forces during World War II. With the advent of the Communist era, the building passed into the hands of the Romanian government, along with SART itself, which was nationalized as a division of the Ministry of Posts and Telecommunications. The 1989 Revolution resulted in the establishment of the independent ROM-POST-TELECOM, reorganized as Romtelecom in July 1991.

A 1993 study revealed structural problems (the roof was never designed to support microwave antennas, but only a coffee shop); before a major reconstruction project could be started in 1997, engineers had to begin by redrawing building plans, as the originals had been lost. Work included reconstruction to duplicate the original façade, as well as structural reinforcement. The reconstruction design was made by Romanian architecture office Proiect Bucuresti. The whole project, which ultimately employed 700 people, cost roughly €1 million and lasted until 2005.
