= Casa Capșa =

Historic restaurant in Bucharest, Romania

Coordinates: 44°26′7.90″N 26°5′53.07″E

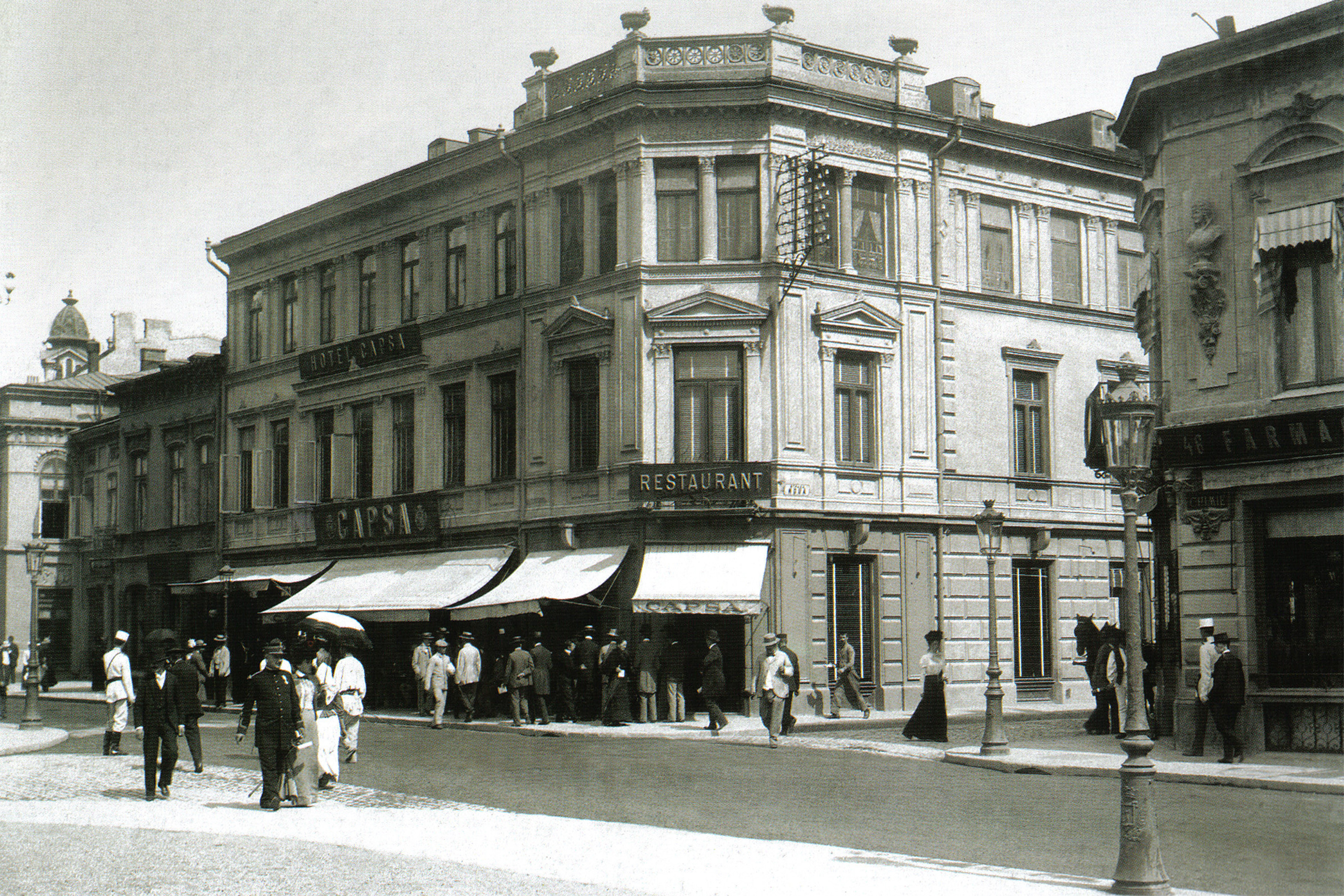
Casa Capșa (1900)

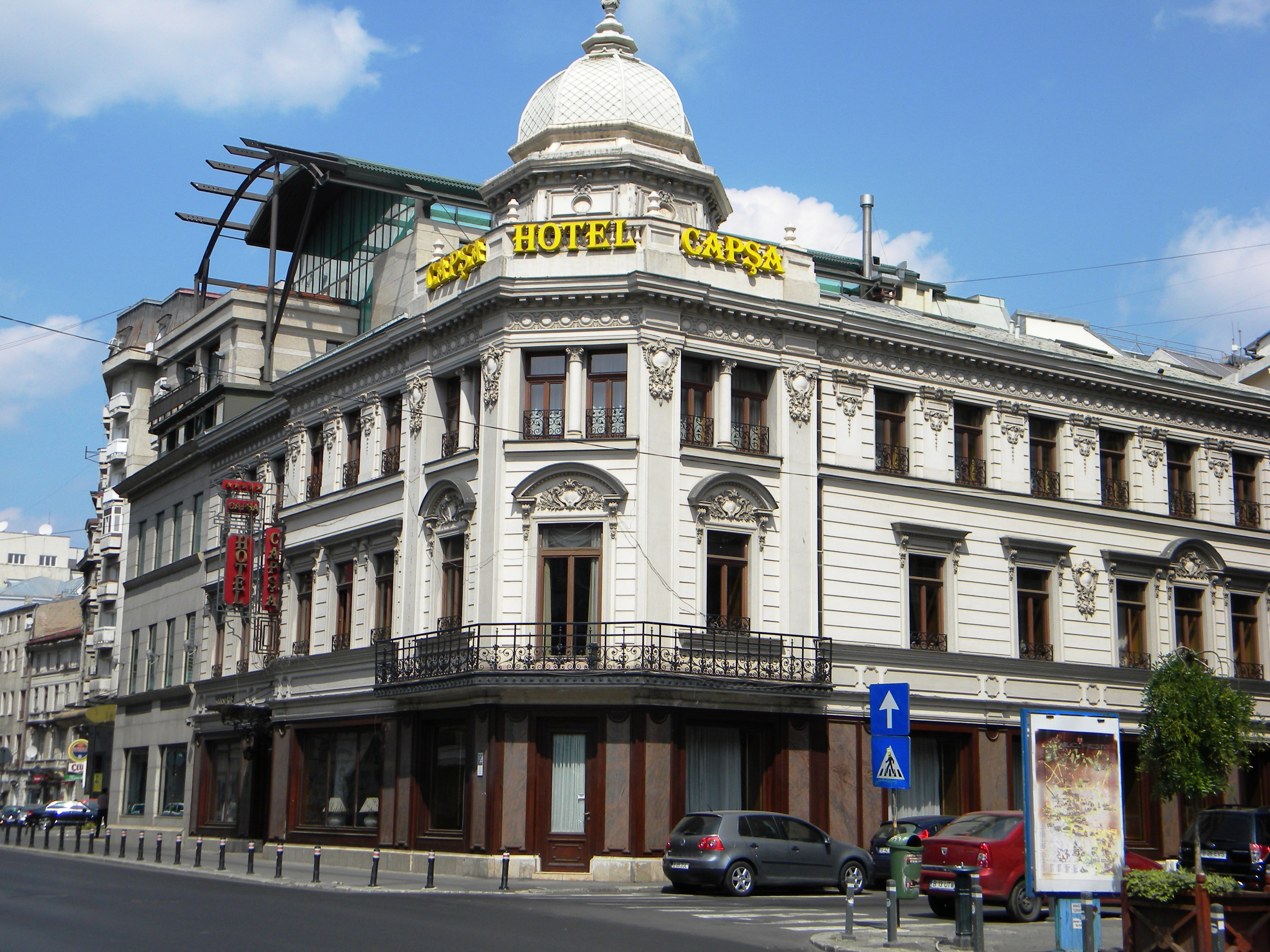
Casa Capșa (2013)

Casa Capșa is a historic restaurant in Bucharest, Romania, first established in 1852. At various times it has also included a hotel; most recently, it reopened as a 61-room hotel 17 June 2003. "...long a symbol of Bucharest for its inhabitants... Capșa is not only associated with its exquisite pastry products, but also for a hectic literary life of yore... a welcoming place for Romanian writers where they could meet, talk and...associate."

The restaurant stands on Calea Victoriei at the corner of Edgar Quinet Street, across from the Hotel Capitol and diagonally across from the Palace of the National Military Circle.

== The restaurant, confectionery, and coffee house ==
In 1852, Anton and Vasile Capșa founded the first confectionery shop on Calea Victoriei, somewhat north of the present Casa Capșa, which was founded by their younger brother Grigore Capșa (1841-1902) in 1868. Anton and Vasile had financed Grigore through four years of courses at the renowned Boissier in Paris, where he turned down an opportunity to become the supplier for the French Imperial Court. The French-inspired confectionery of Casa Capșa soon established a continent-wide reputation. The business expanded in 1881 to a full-service restaurant, at a time when quality restaurants along Western European lines were still quite a rarity in Romania.

In December 1916, during World War I, following the Battle of Bucharest and the occupation of the city by the Central Powers, the restaurant was requisitioned by troops of the Kingdom of Bulgaria's army. Reportedly, these left the place in a deplorable condition for an extended period of time. Casa Capșa invented the all-chocolate Joffre cake in honor of a visit to Romania by Joseph Joffre after the war, and they were the first to introduce ice cream to the country.

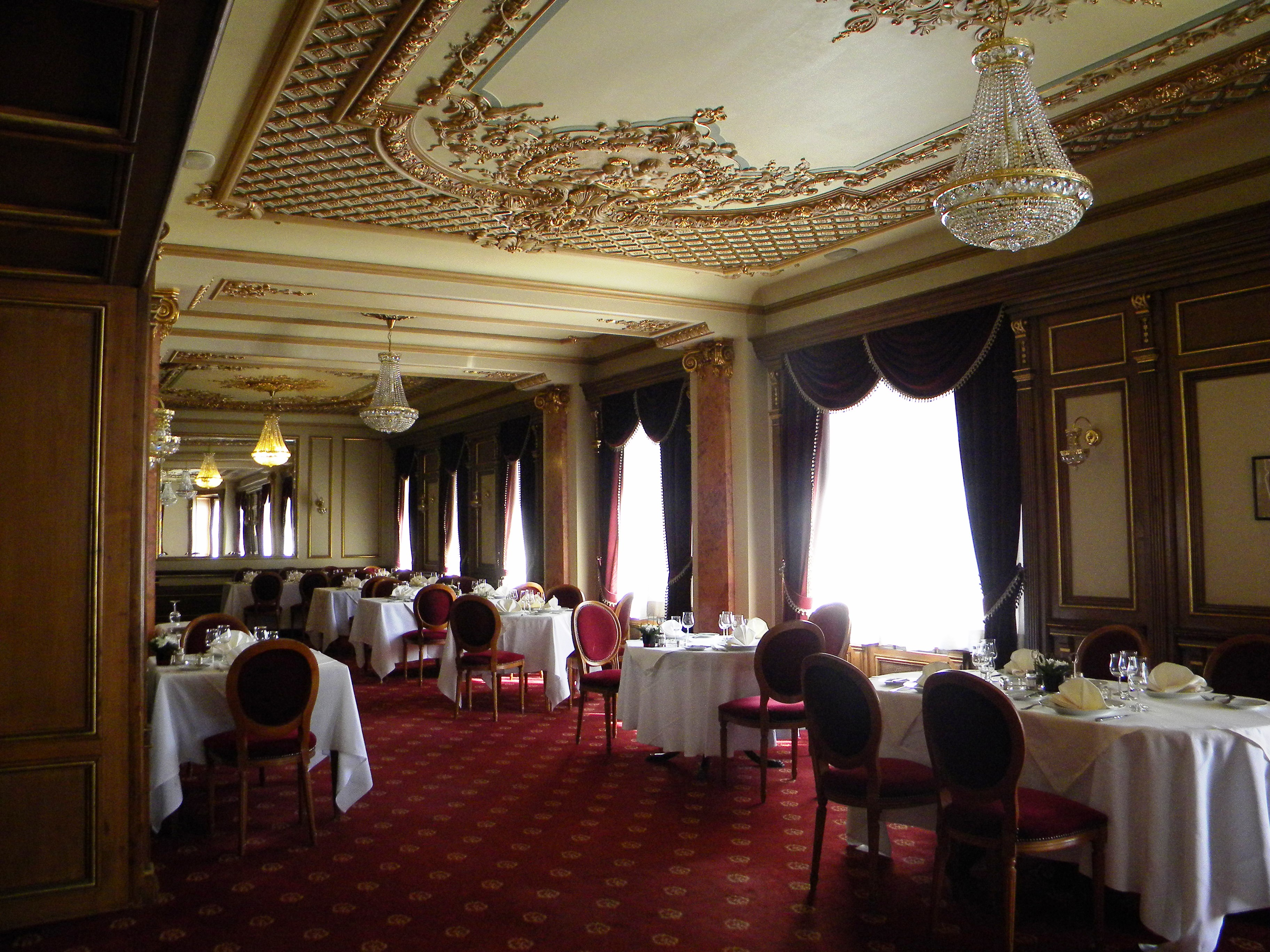
Interior of Casa Capșa

The coffee house, established 1891, was an important literary and artistic gathering place, but never turned a profit, "because the writers and artists who went there usually ordered mineral water and coffee and made them last for hours on end." In contrast to the elegant restaurant and confectioner, the coffee house had simple, uncovered wooden tables. Tudor Arghezi referred to it as an "Academy"; one could make a literary reputation by reading one's texts there. Actors also were among the regulars: at the time the Romanian National Theatre was nearly across the street, adjacent to the Terasa Oteteleșanu, now the site of the Bucharest Telephone Palace.

When the Romanian Communist Party took power in 1948, they closed Casa Capșa. The restaurant operated during most of the communist era as the "Bucharest Restaurant", regaining the Capșa name in 1984. It was at the Capșa that the poet Nicolae Labiș stood up in November 1956 and loudly recited Mihai Eminescu's banned patriotic poem "Doina"; a few weeks later, after spending some time at the Capșa, Labiș was fatally hit by a tram, just a short distance away.

The In Your Pocket guide series describes it as having been "...the chosen venue for the beautiful people at the turn of the [19th] century... it degenerated into a Communist party haunt for the illiterate and intellectually unendowed party bosses." Mioara Ioniță writes, "Its fame remains, but it has lost some of its pre-war glamour. It exists as such, but the spirit that animated it has vanished."

== The hotel ==
The enterprise was expanded in 1886 to include the Capșa Hotel, initially a guest house for members of parliament from out of town. The French manager had formerly managed the Hôtel Café Anglais in Paris. In 1908, the British magazine John Bull ranked it "among the best hotels in the world". According to the revived hotel's web site, "It was considered for a long time the only suitable residence of the artists, rich and aristocratic families or high rank politiciens [sic] and diplomats visiting Romania," a role it would eventually yield to the Athénée Palace.

Among the hotel's guests in its heyday were German Kaisers Wilhelm I and Wilhelm II; Austro-Hungarian emperor Franz Josef I; several members of the Imperial Russian royal family, including Tsar Alexander II; all four Romanian monarchs and their queens consort; kings of Greece, Serbia, and Bulgaria; and such other notables as Josephine Baker, Sarah Bernhardt, Enrico Caruso, George Enescu, Paul Morand, W. Averell Harriman, Józef Piłsudski, and Raymond Poincaré.
