= Pasajul Macca-Vilacrosse =

Heritage site in Bucharest, Romania

Coordinates: 44°25′59.27″N 26°5′54.97″E

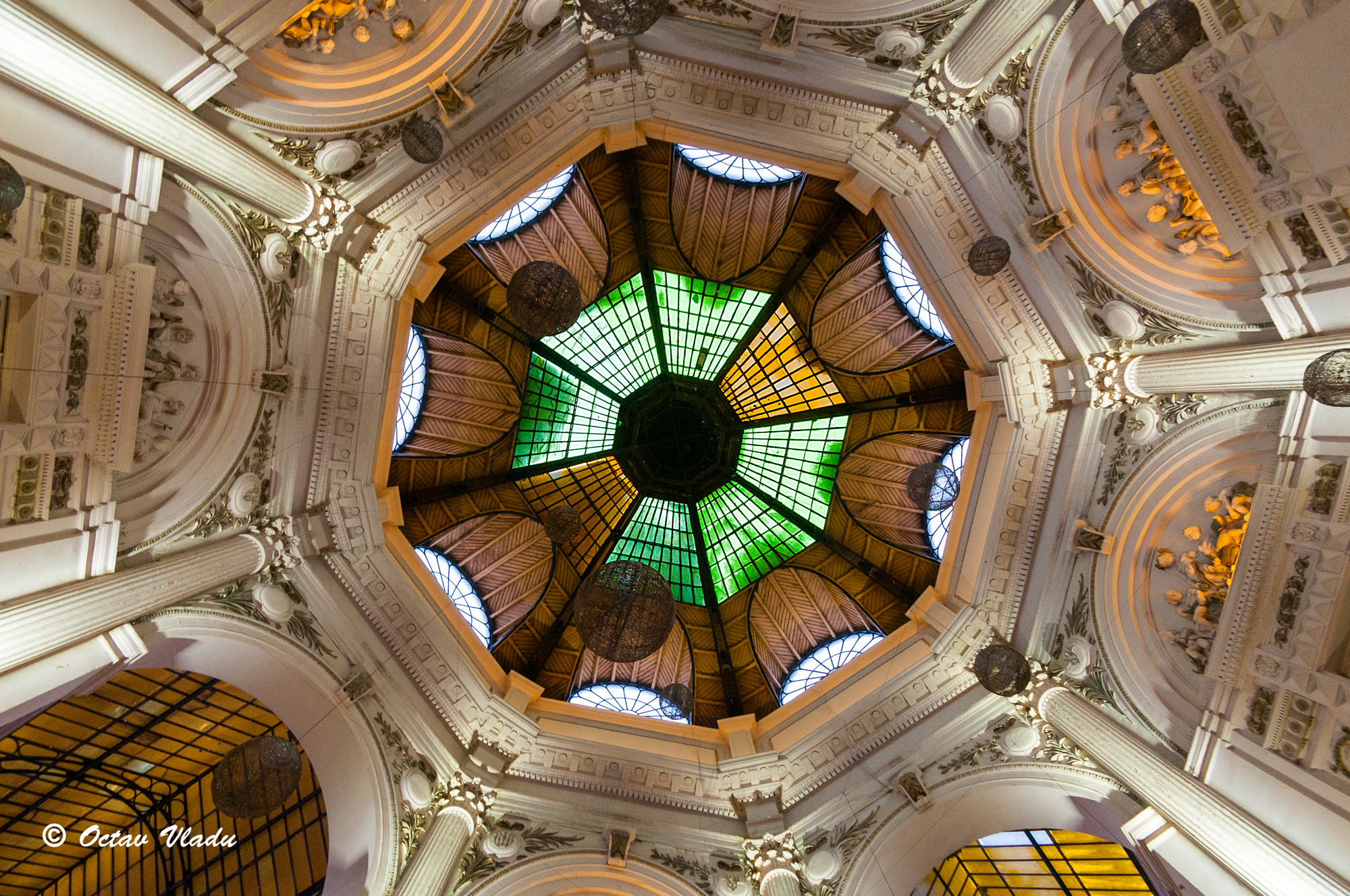
Macca-Villacrosse Passage

Pasajul Macca-Vilacrosse is a fork-shaped, yellow glass covered arcaded street in central Bucharest, Romania. Câmpineanu Inn (Romanian: Hanul Câmpineanu) once stood in the place nowadays occupied by the passage.

The old Inn was bought by Petros Seraphim, who gifted it to two of his daughters as dowries. Daughter Polixena married in 1843 Xavier Vilacrosse, Chief Architect of Bucharest, 1840–1848, the Inn renamed after him. Daughter Anastasia married Mihalache Macca, who built luxury shops on their part. In the late 1880s, the city decided to buy the sites to build a Western style passage to relieve congestion. It was designed by architect Felix Xenopol, and opened in 1891.

Because the central part of the site was occupied by the Pesht Hotel, which the owner refused to sell, the passage was executed as a two-tined, fork-like shape with two wings around the two sides of the hotel. The narrow streets were covered with a glass roof, allowing the entry of natural light while providing shelter from the rain. The ground floor was meant for shops, while the rooms on the first floor were for rent. One branch of the passage was called Vilacrosse, while the other one was called Macca, after the old owners. The two-tined end opens onto Calea Victoriei, one of Bucharest's main avenues; the other end opens toward the National Bank in the historic Lipscani district.

Pasajul Macca-Vilacrosse hosted the first Stock Exchange House of Bucharest, before a larger and more appropriate structure was built. Between 1950 and 1990 the passage was called Pasajul Bijuteria ("Jewelry Store Passage"), but the initial name was restored afterwards.

Today it hosts several indoor/outdoor eating establishments, including an Egyptian-themed bar/restaurant, the Blues Cafe, a bistro, a Chinese restaurant and a wine bar.

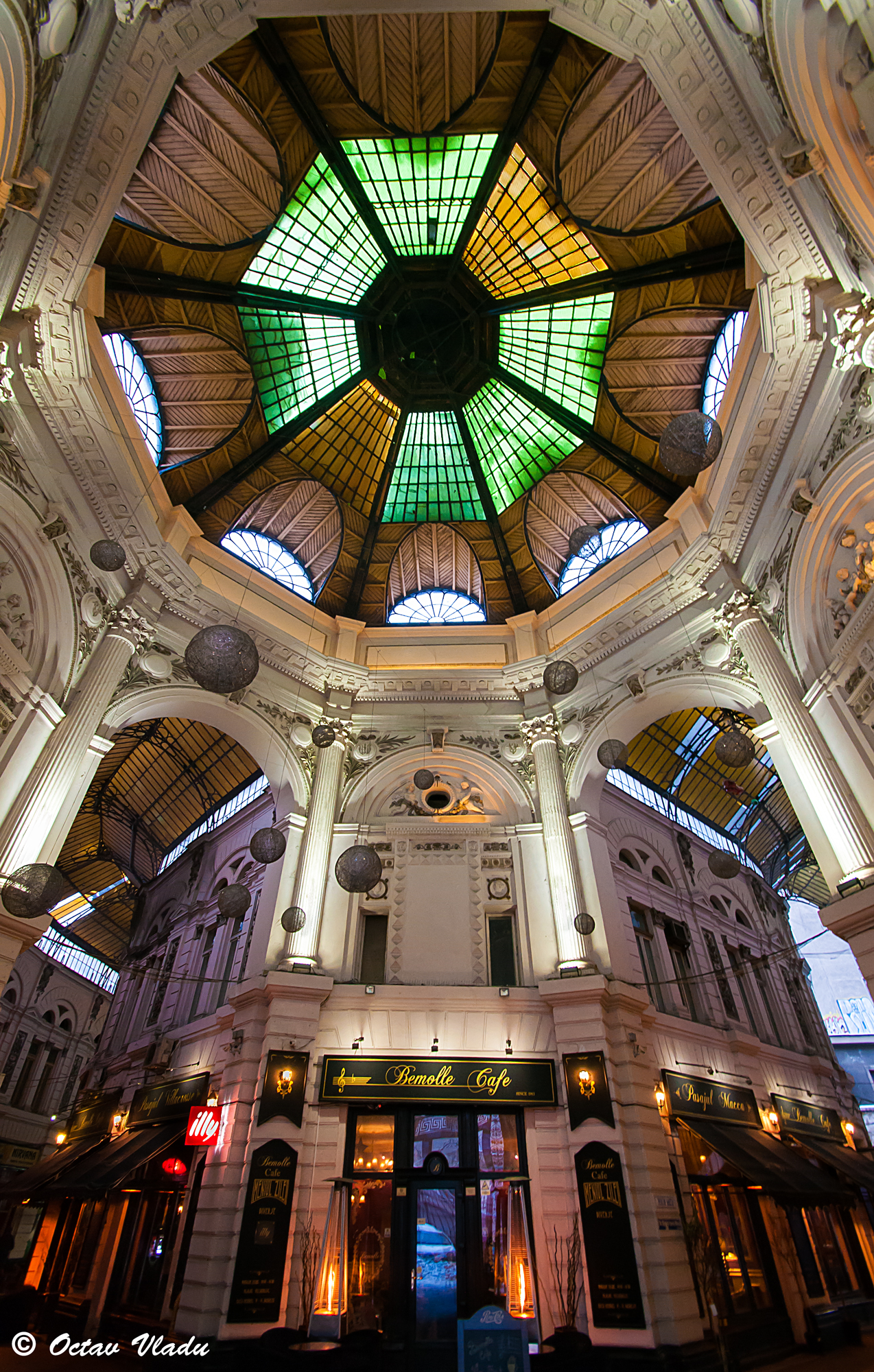

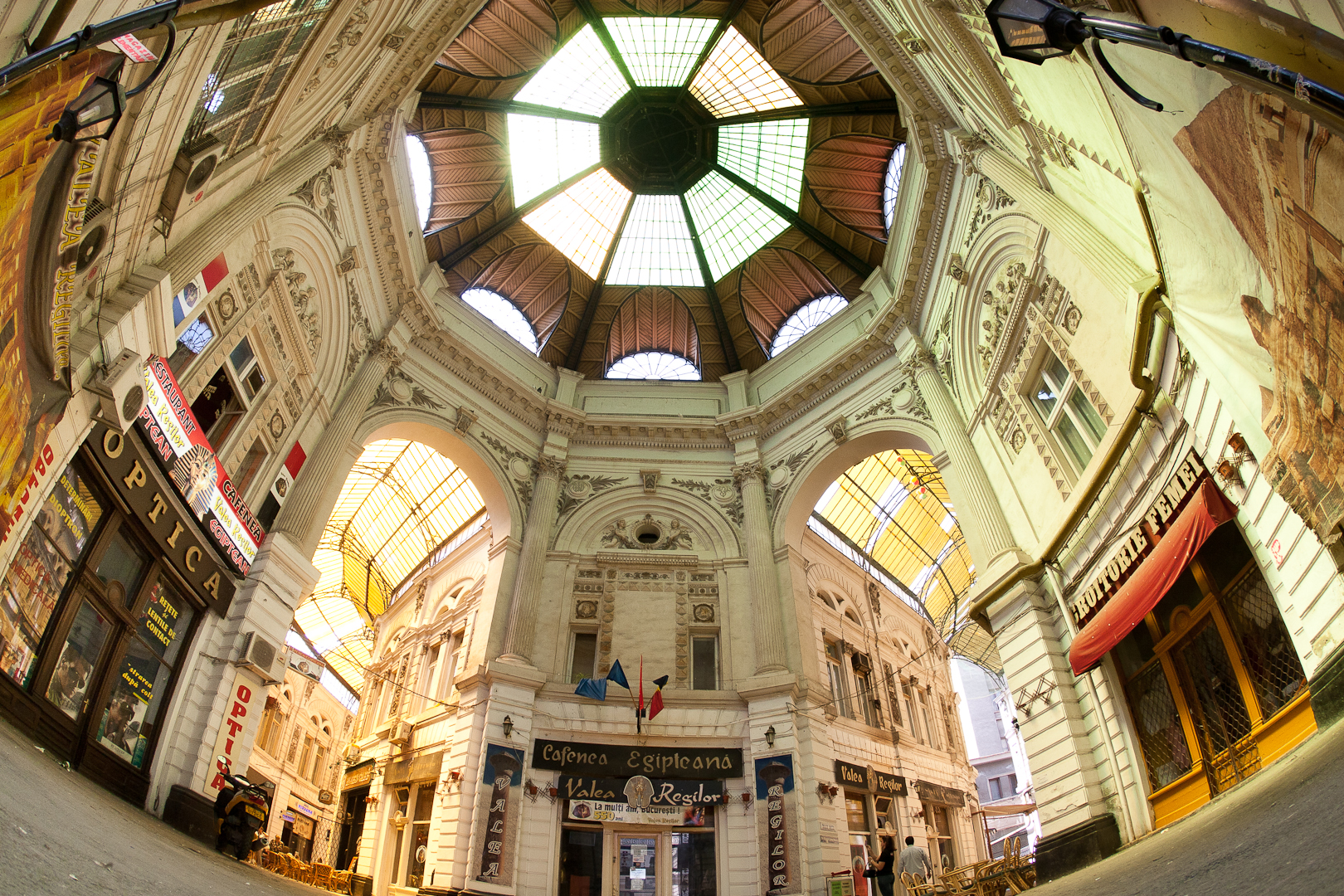

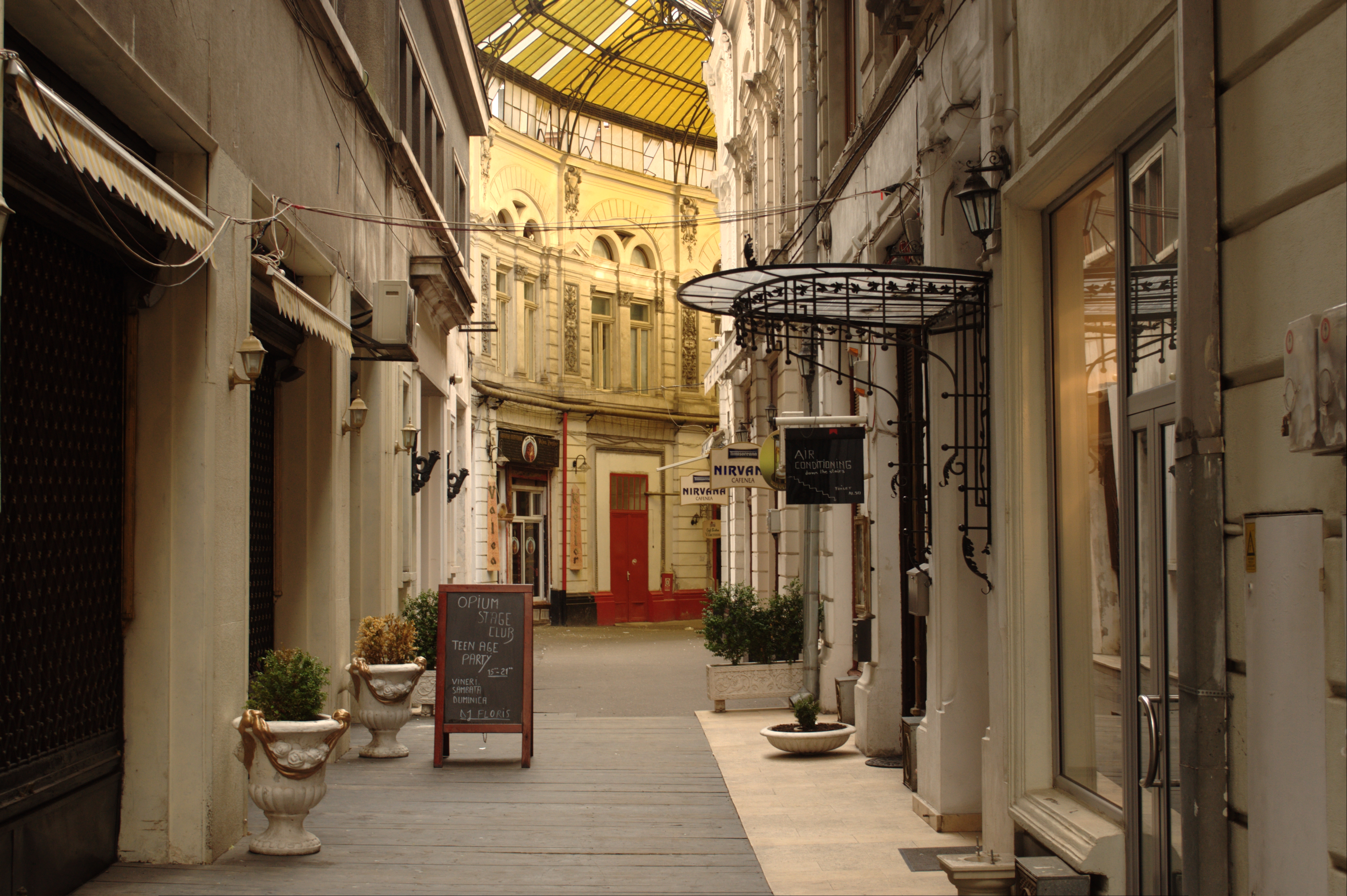

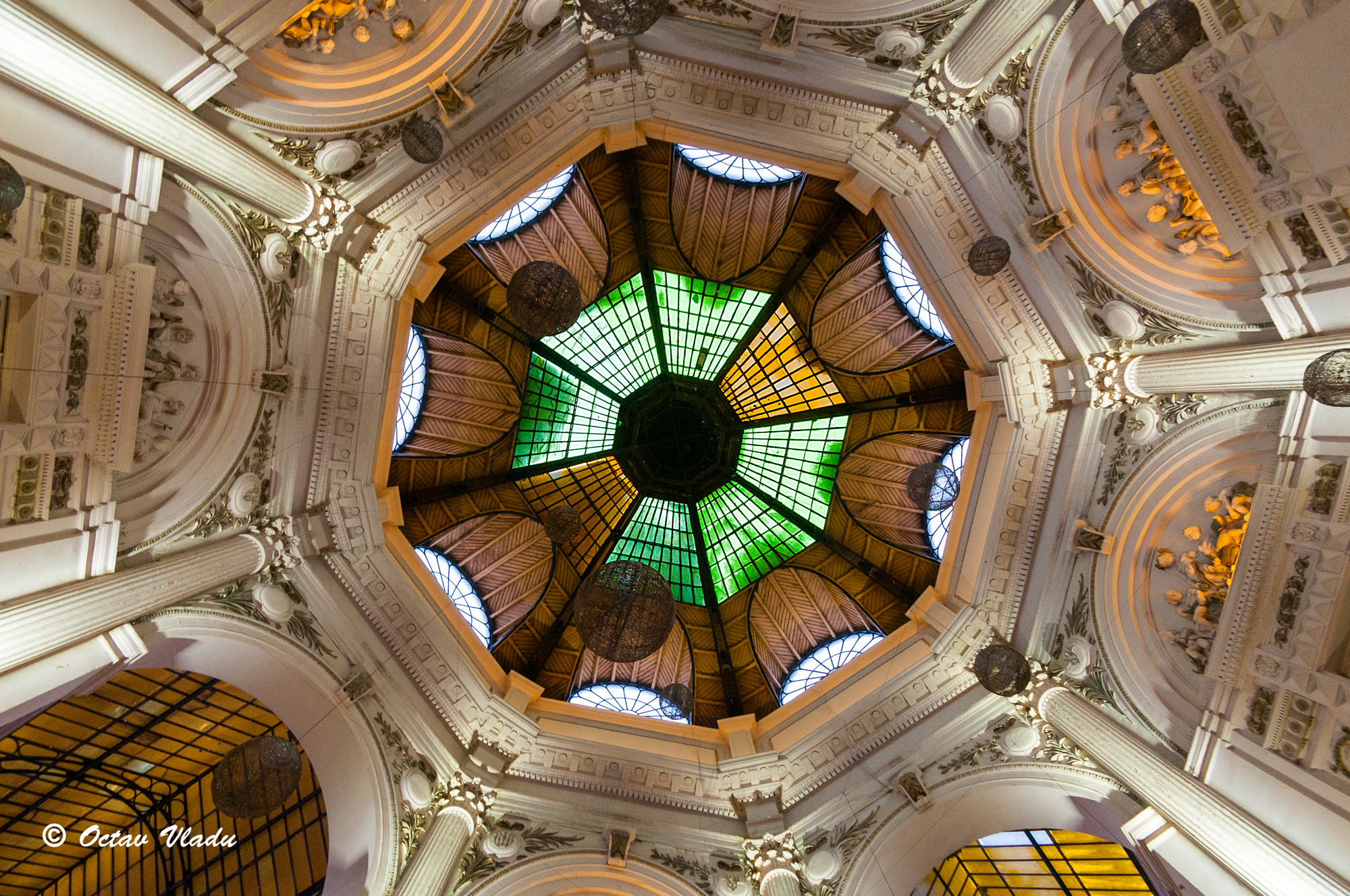

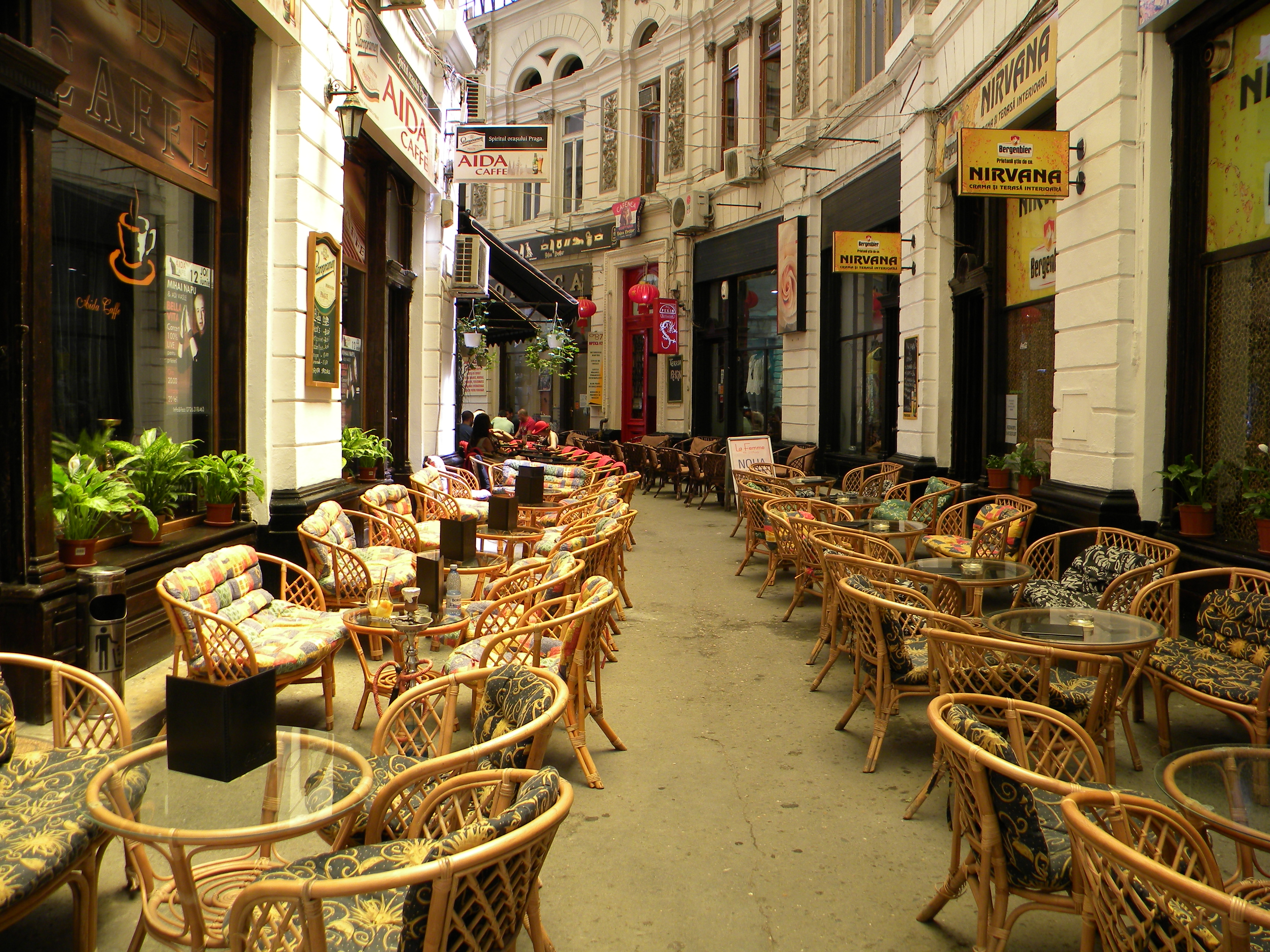

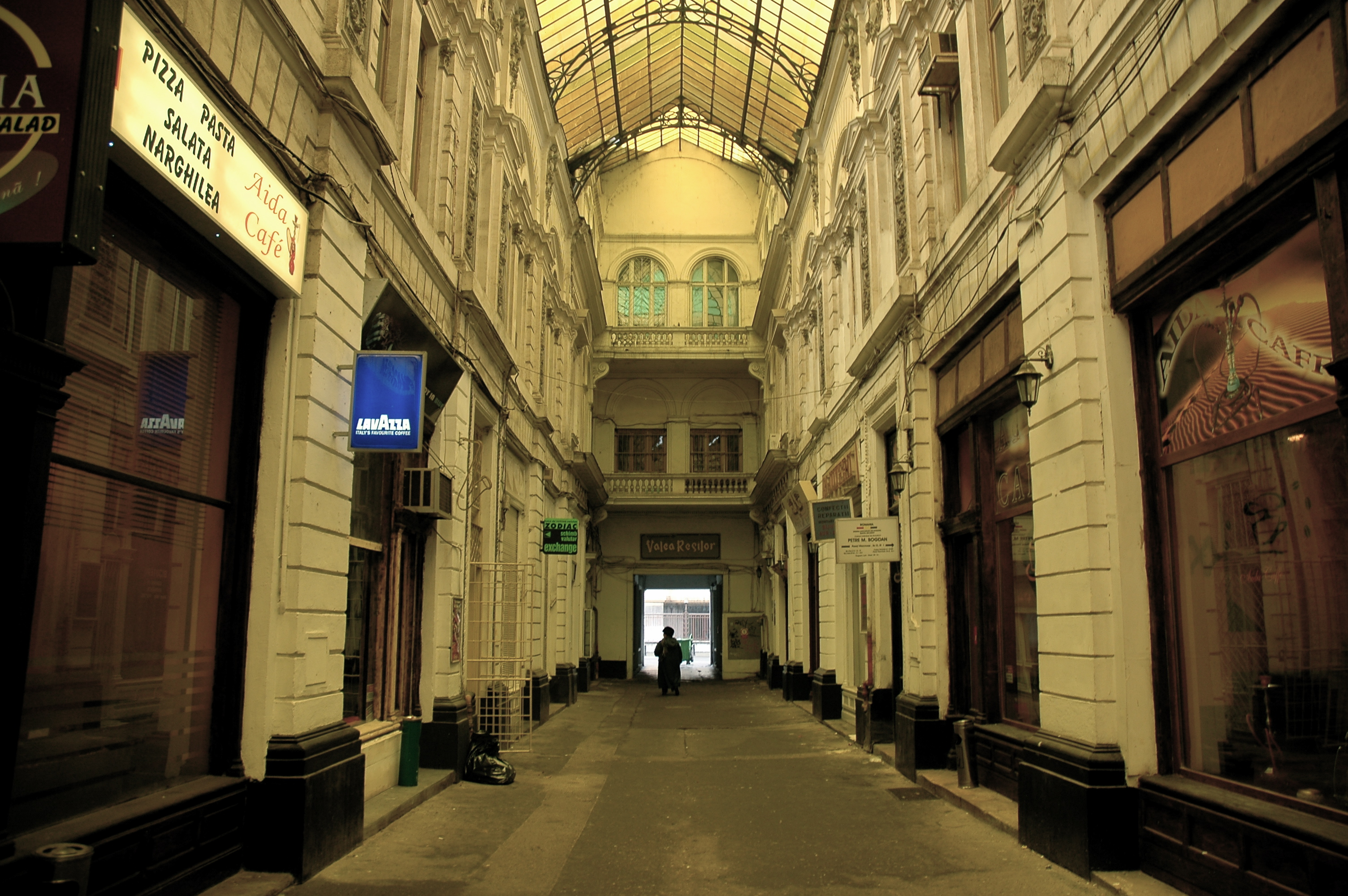

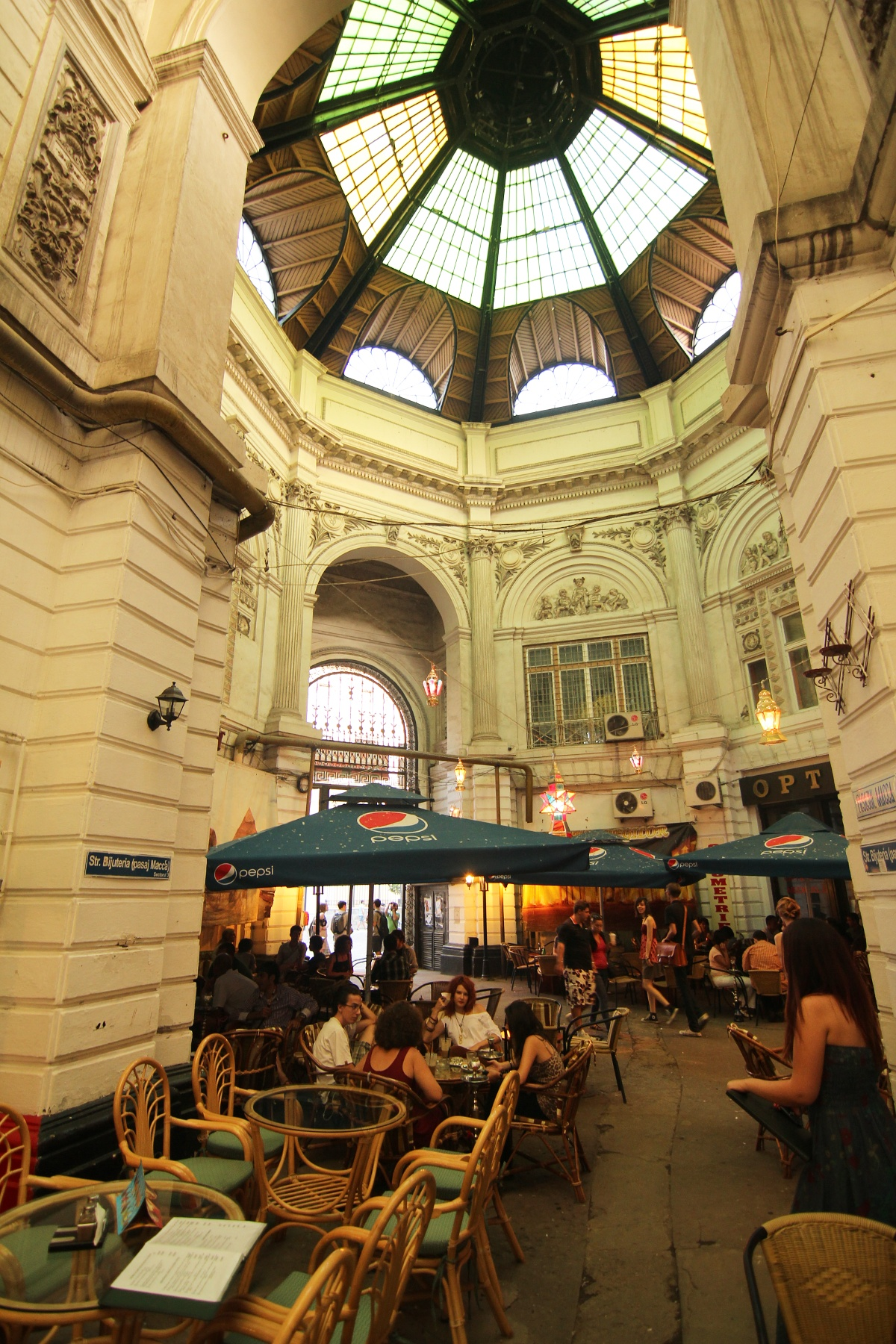

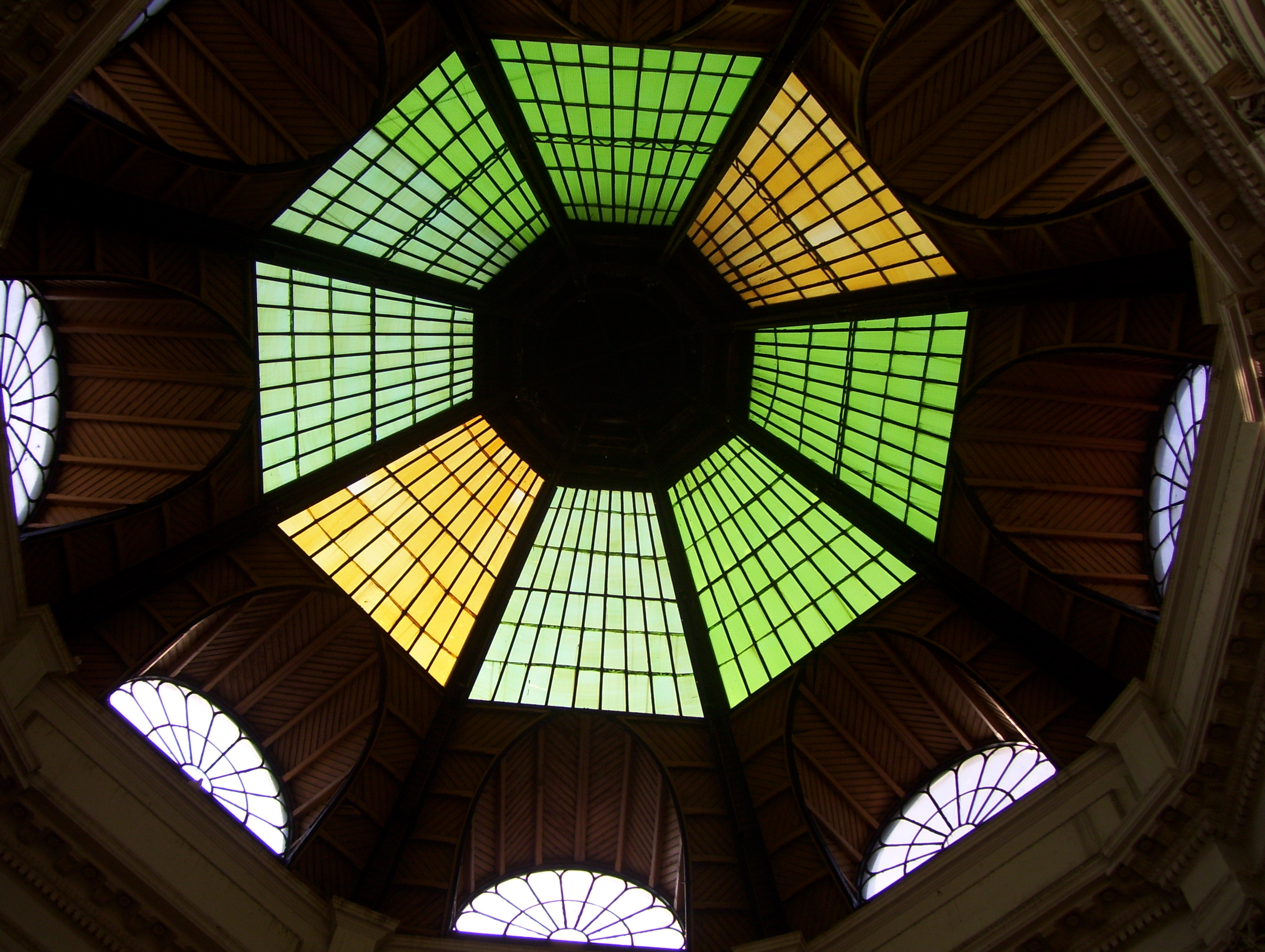

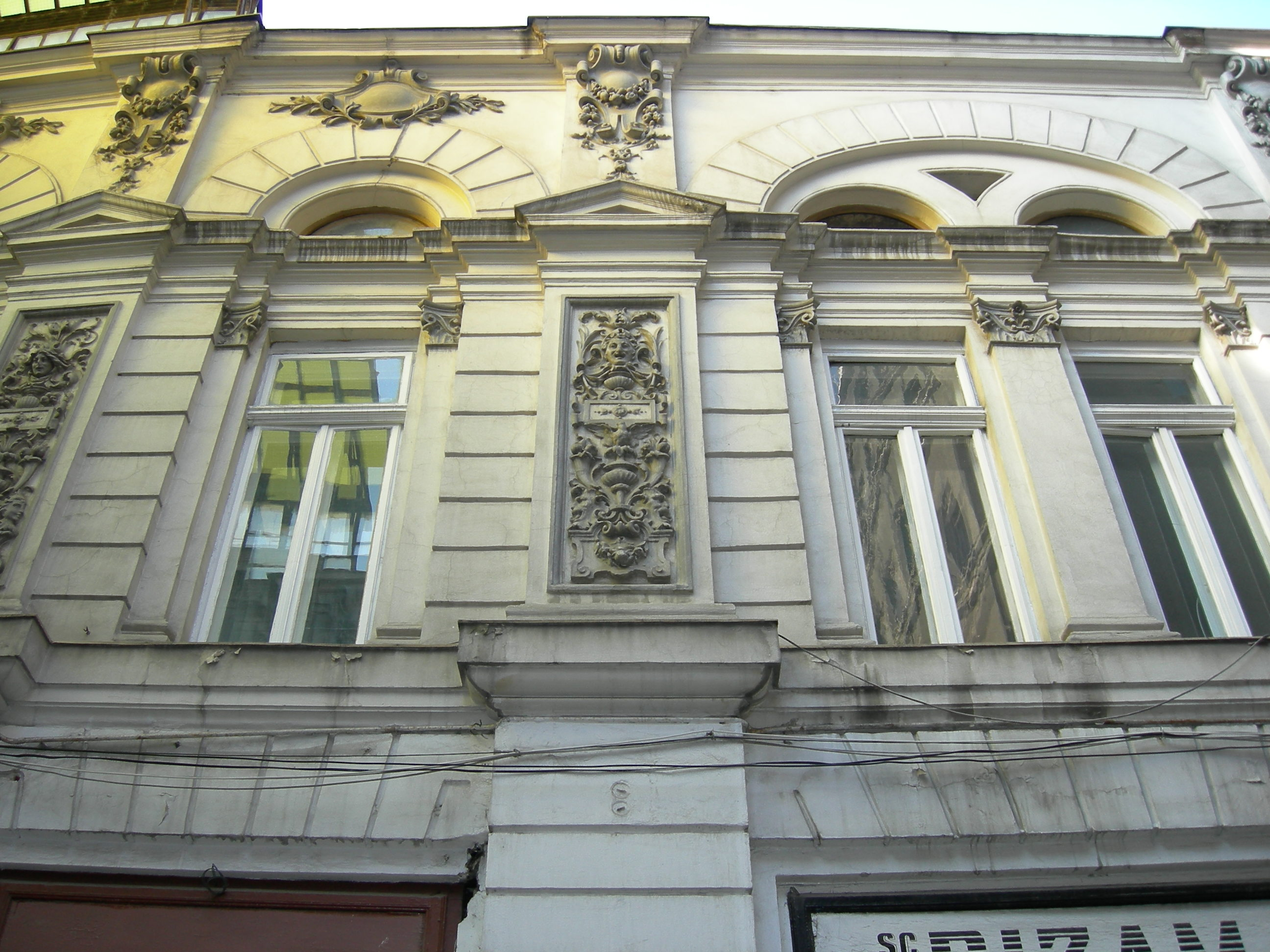

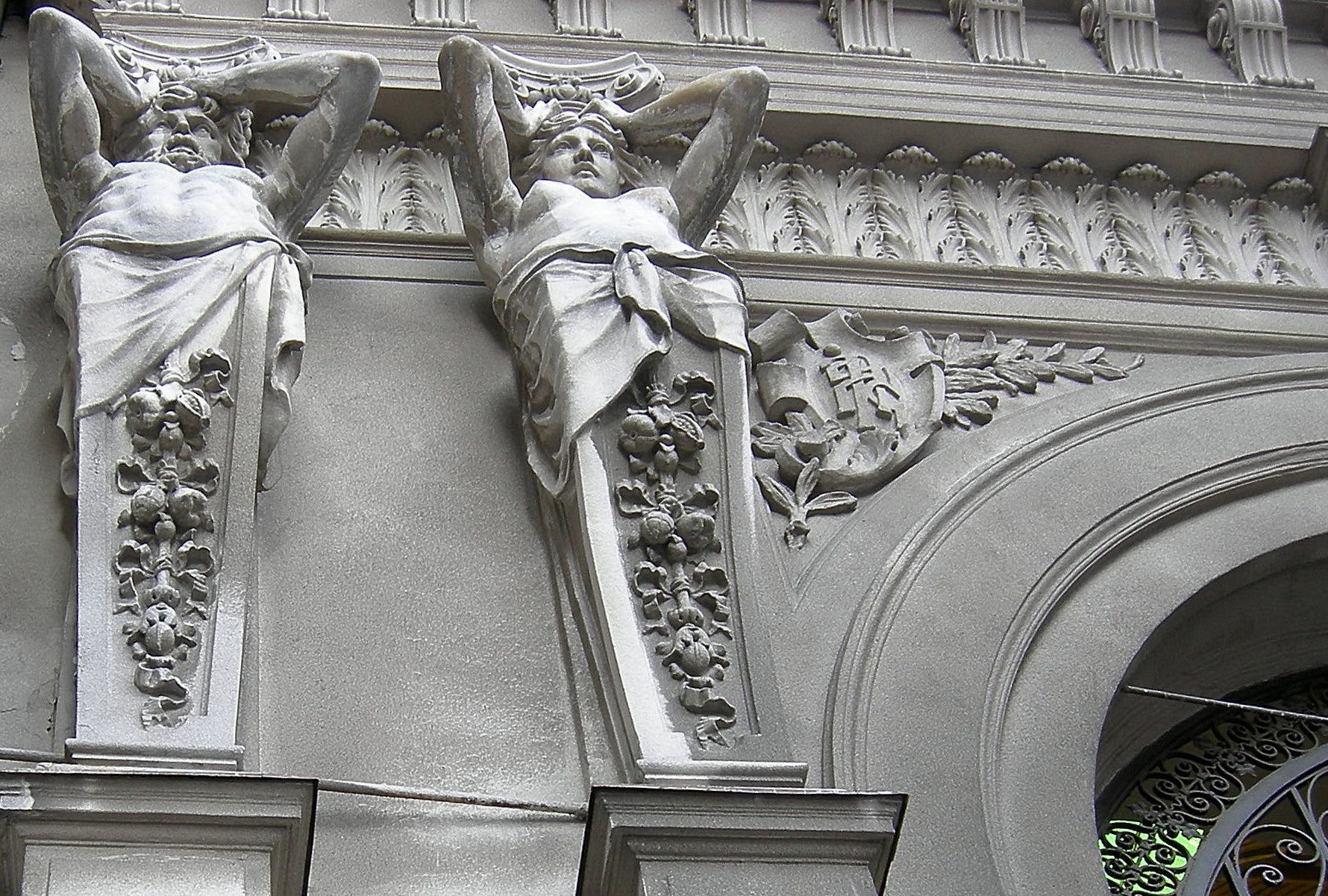
