= Maryse Rutledge =

American author (1886–1957)

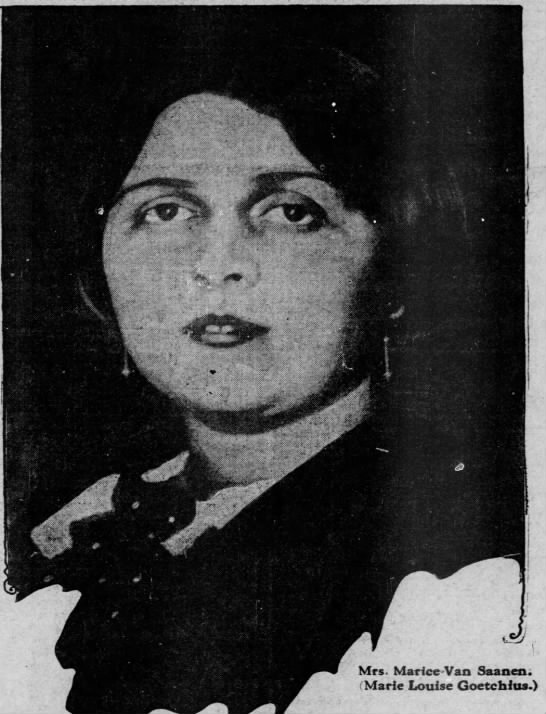
- Born: November 24, 1884
- Died: May 4, 1957 (aged 72)
- Occupation: Writer, suffragist
- Spouse(s): Edmond van Saanen Algi, Gardner Hale

Marie Louise Gibson Hale (November 24, 1886 – May 4, 1957) was an American author who published under the names Maryse Rutledge, Marice Rutledge, Marie Louise Goetchius, and Marie Louise Van Saanen.

Marie Louise Gibson was born on November 24, 1884. She was the daughter of George Rutledge Gibson and Laura Belden Gibson.

Her novels include the anti-war novel Children of Fate (1917) and the science-fiction novel The Silver Peril (1931). Her short story "The Thing They Loved", published in The Century, was included in the O. Henry Award's Prize Stories of 1920.

== Personal life ==
Hale was married three times. In 1904, she married Morgan Goetchius. They had two children who died in infancy. She married next to Romanian artist and architect Edmond van Saanen Algi. Her third husband was painter Gardner Hale. They married in 1916 and divorced in 1927. He went on to marry Dorothy Hale.

== Bibliography ==
- Anne of Tréboul 1910
- The Blind Who See 1911
- Wild Grapes 1913
- Children of Fate 1917
- The Sad Adventurers 1924
- The Silver Peril 1931
