= Calea Victoriei =

Thoroughfare in Bucharest, Romania

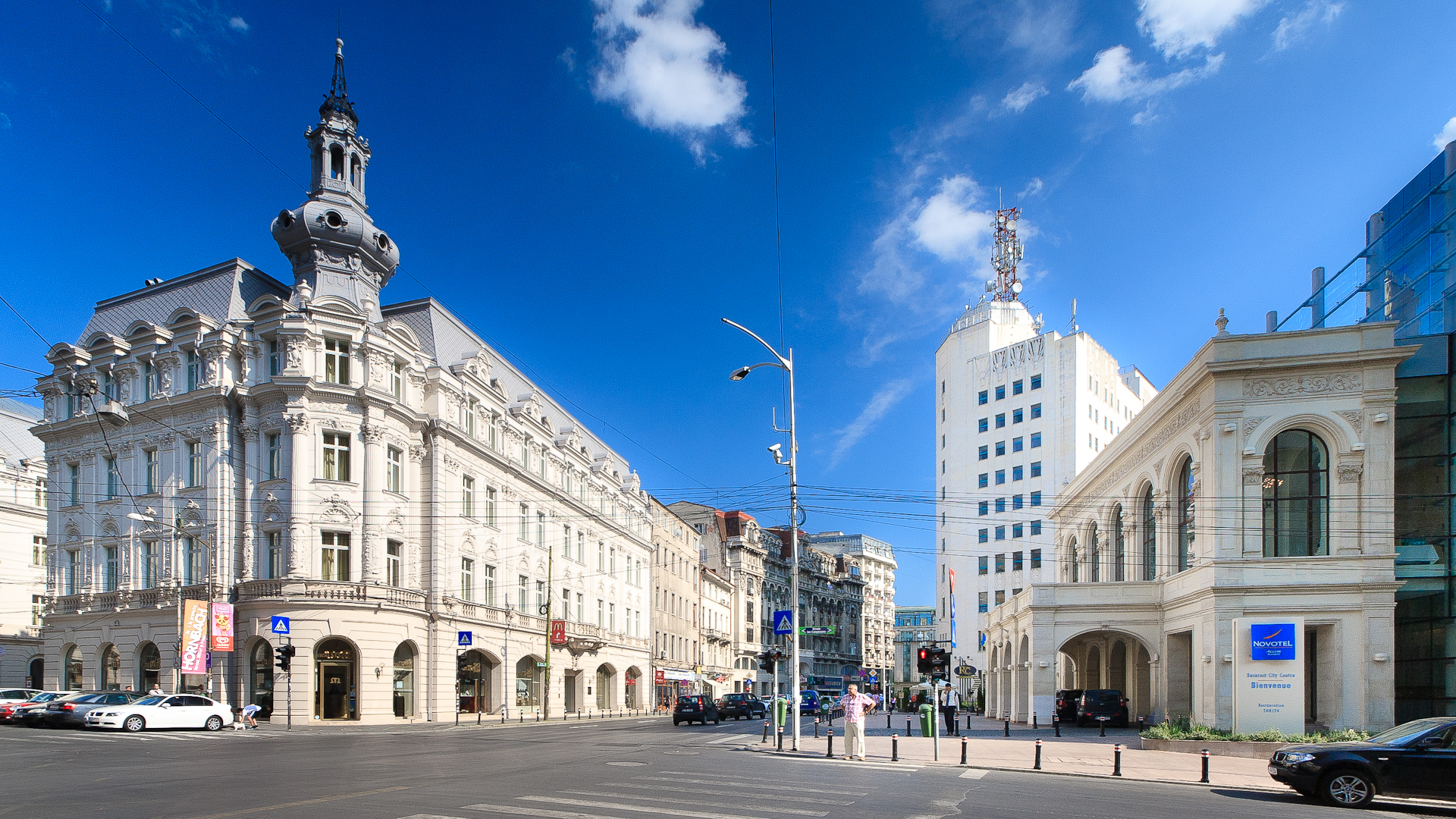
- Looking south towards the Bucharest Telephone Palace
- Interactive map of Calea Victoriei
- Former name: Ulița Mare Drumul Brașovului Podul Mogoșoaiei
- Length: 2.7 km (1.7 mi)
- Location: Bucharest, Romania
- Nearest metro station: Piața Unirii; Universitate; Piața Victoriei 44°26′31.49″N 26°5′38.57″E
- South end: Splaiul Independenței
- Major junctions: Revolution Square
- North end: Victory Square

Construction
- Inauguration: 1692

Calea Victoriei (Victory Avenue) is a major avenue in central Bucharest. Situated in Sector 1, and having a length of 2.7 kilometres (1.7 mi), it leads from Splaiul Independenței (which runs parallel to the Dâmbovița River) to the north and then northwest up to Piața Victoriei, where Șoseaua Kiseleff continues north.

== History ==
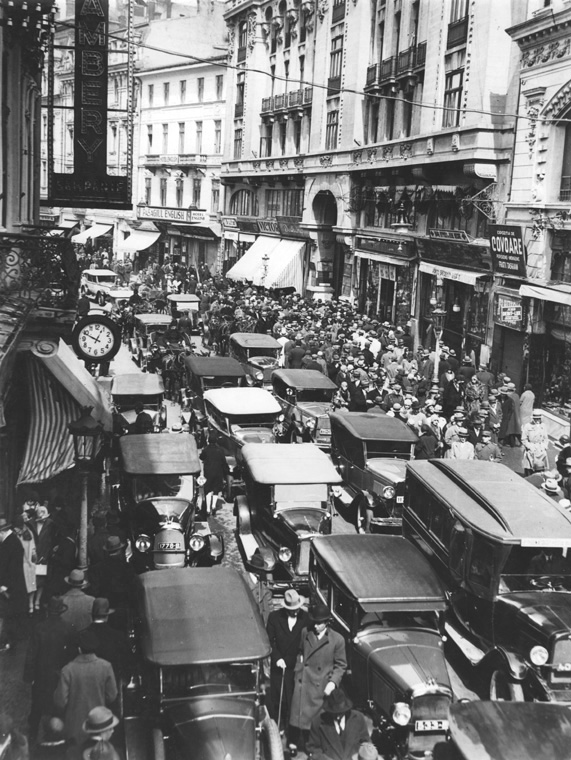
The avenue in 1923

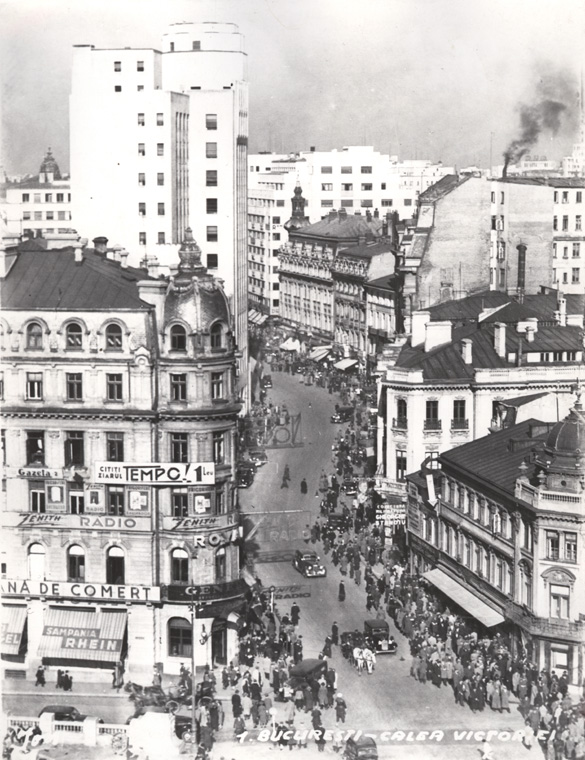
Calea Victoriei in 1935. On left is Hotel Capitol and on right is the Casa Capșa. The tall building is the Telephone Palace.

Initially, the road was known as Ulița Mare (Large Street), also known as Drumul Brașovului (Brașov Road), being part of the trade route between Bucharest and the city of Brașov, in Transylvania. In 1692, ruler Constantin Brâncoveanu paved the road with wood and partly regularized it, making it pass through the domains of the Bălăceni, of the Saint John Monastery, Zlătari Monastery and of the Cantacuzenes up to the Sărindari Monastery. Since 1692 it was known as Podul Mogoșoaiei (Mogoșoaia Wood-Paved Road) because it also was connecting the Bucharest's center with Brâncoveanu's Mogoșoaia Palace some kilometres outside the city.

Most roads in the Balkans at that time became muddy in the spring and autumn, and the wood prevented this. Consequently, the road was one of the most important construction works of the area and a source of pride to Bucharesters. The area surrounding the road became the most fashionable part of Bucharest: 35 boyar houses were located on the road itself in 1775.

Podul Mogoșoaiei was the first street in Bucharest to be illuminated with candles during the night, starting July 1814.

The wood was not a very sturdy material and often it was in a bad state, despite being repaired several times (including in 1793 and 1814). During the Russian occupation of the Danubian Principalities, in the aftermath of the Russo-Turkish War (1828–1829), an extension from Piața Victoriei northward was built by Pavel Kiseleff, the commander of the occupation troops, and is today named after him. In 1842 the road was paved with cobblestone. It was later upgraded to asphalt.

The road was renamed "Calea Victoriei" on October 12, 1878, following the Romanian victory in the Independence War of 1877–1878.

Calea Victoriei was Bucharest's showpiece street in the Interwar period. Tudor Octavian wrote, "this is how the whole of Bucharest would look if we had been allowed[...], if its builders had been clever enough[...]". After roughly half a century of decline, it has recently been returning to this role.

Today, the avenue is lined with new fashion shops, art boutiques, coffee shops and restaurants, making it an upmarket shopping strip in Bucharest.

As of 2023, the association Streets for People (in Romanian: Străzi pentru Oameni) started a petition to make the entire avenue fully pedestrian.

== Buildings and monuments ==
Major buildings and monuments along the street include (from north to south):

- The Cantacuzino Palace, hosting The George Enescu Museum
- Museum of Art Collections
- Știrbey Palace
- The Athénée Palace Hotel, now a Hilton
- Romanian Athenaeum
- National Museum of Art of Romania
- The Central Library of the University of Bucharest
- Kretzulescu Church
- Piața Revoluției (Revolution Square), including the Memorial of Rebirth
- Palatul Telefoanelor
- Odeon Theatre
- Casa Capșa
- Palace of the National Military Circle
- Pasajul Macca-Vilacrosse
- Bucharest Financial Plaza
- National Museum of History of Romania, with the Statue of Trajan and the She-wolf on its steps
- CEC Palace

The avenue was also long home to the Constantin Tănase Revue Theatre (as of 2006, relocated to the Lipscani district), and was the site of the old Romanian National Theater, just north of Palatul Telefoanelor; the departed theatre's façade is replicated by the front of the Bucharest Novotel that opened in summer 2006. The Romanian Athenaeum is set back slightly from the street, with a small park in between.

The National Museum of Art of Romania (the former Royal Palace) and the University Library across the street from it (both damaged in the 1989 Revolution) were restored in the 1990s; Palatul Telefoanelor was restored between 1997 and 2005. There has also been an ongoing refurbishment of the street's many hotels, including the Athénée Palace, the Majestic, the Capitol, and the Capșa Hotel; as of 2010, the Grand Hotel du Boulevard is undergoing restoration, while renovation of the Continental and Novotel has been completed.

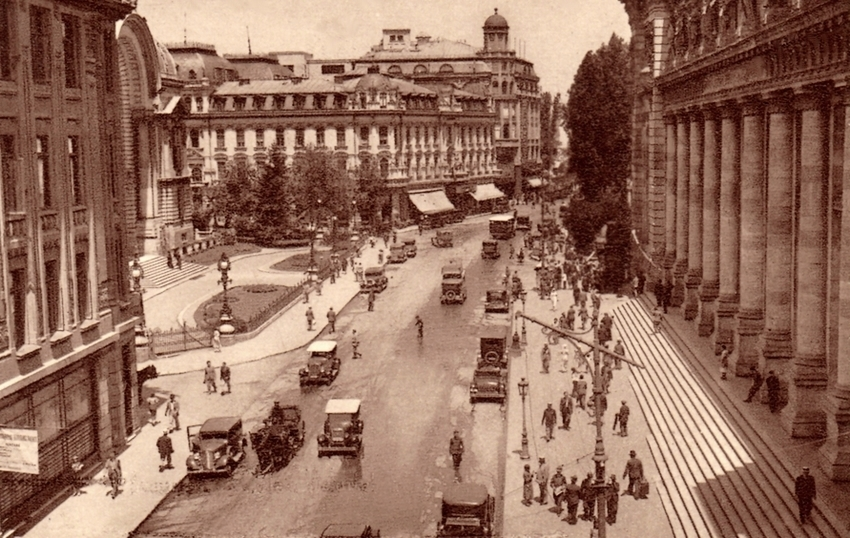
Calea Victoriei in the 1940s. Postal palace (today the History Museum) and CEC Palace (left)

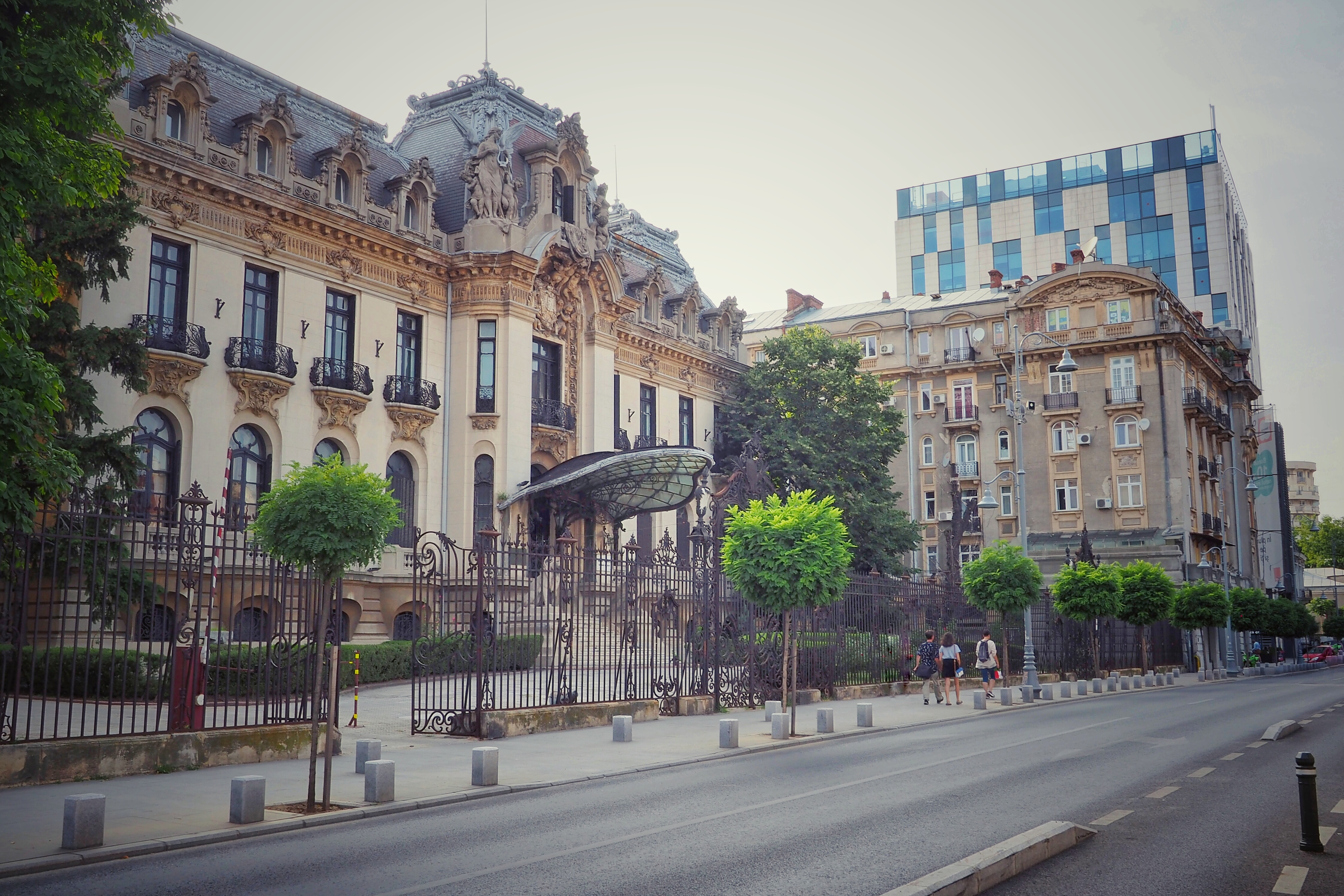
Cantacuzino Palace

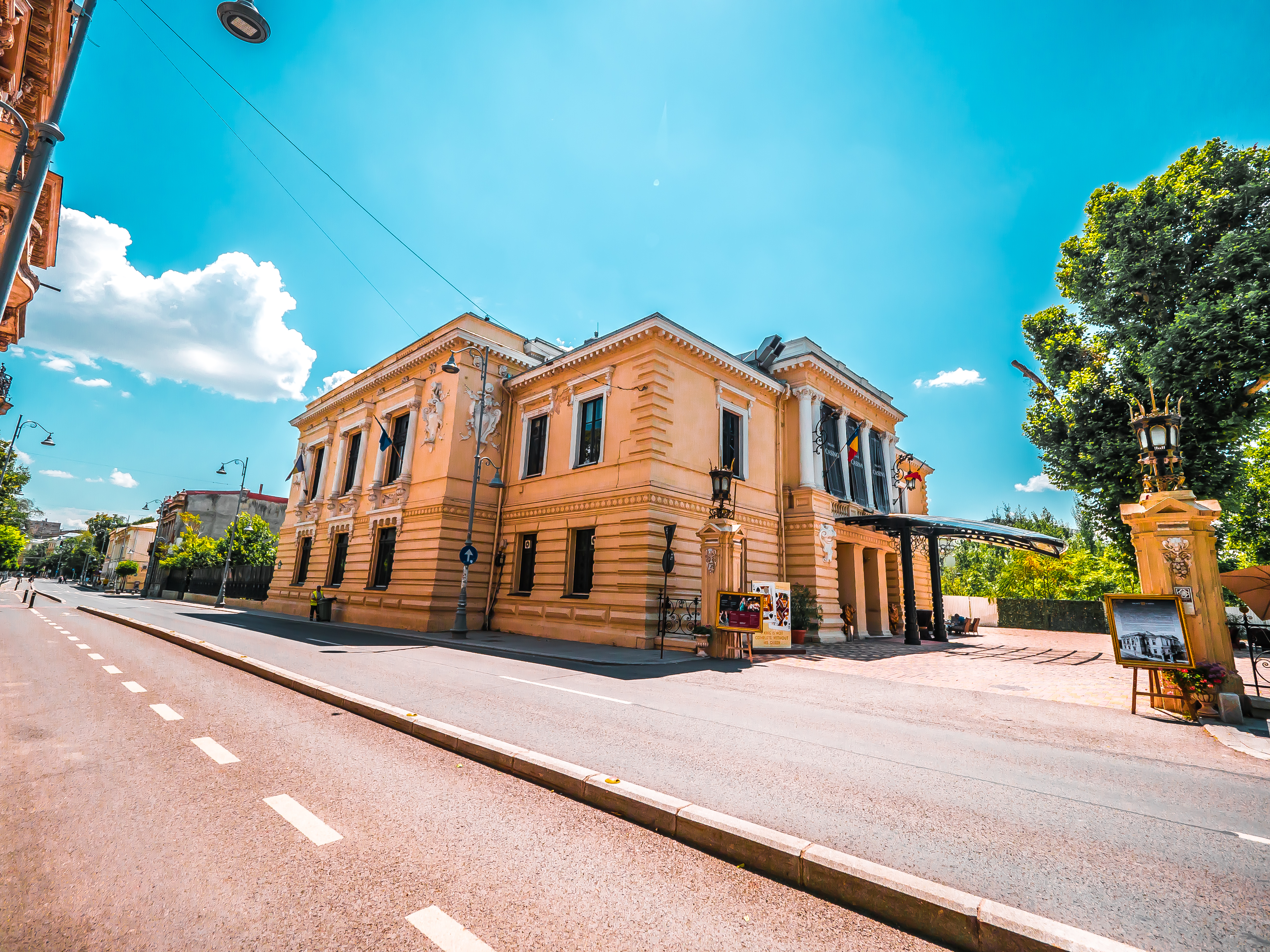
Vernescu House

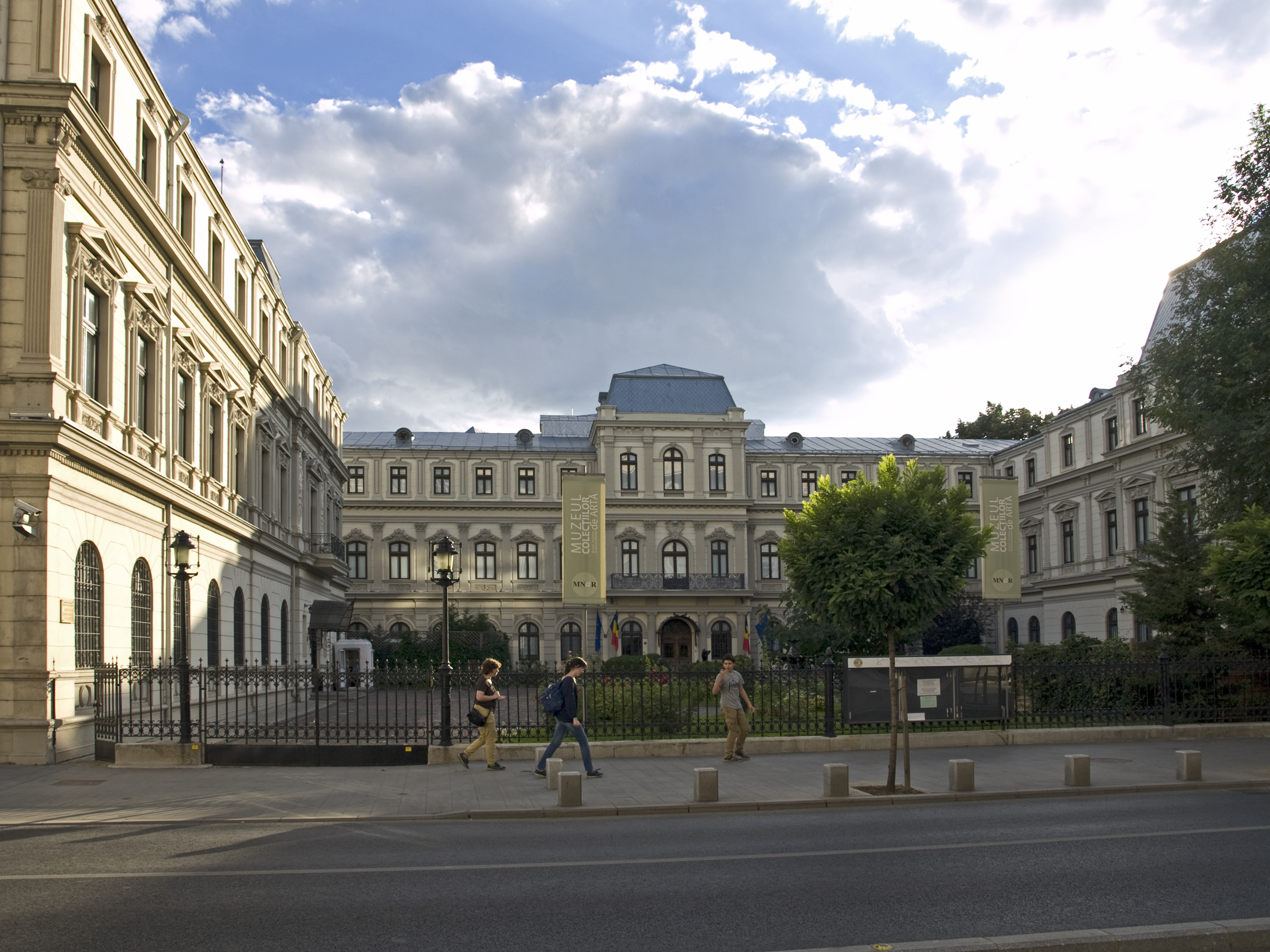
Museum of Art Collections

Athenee Palace

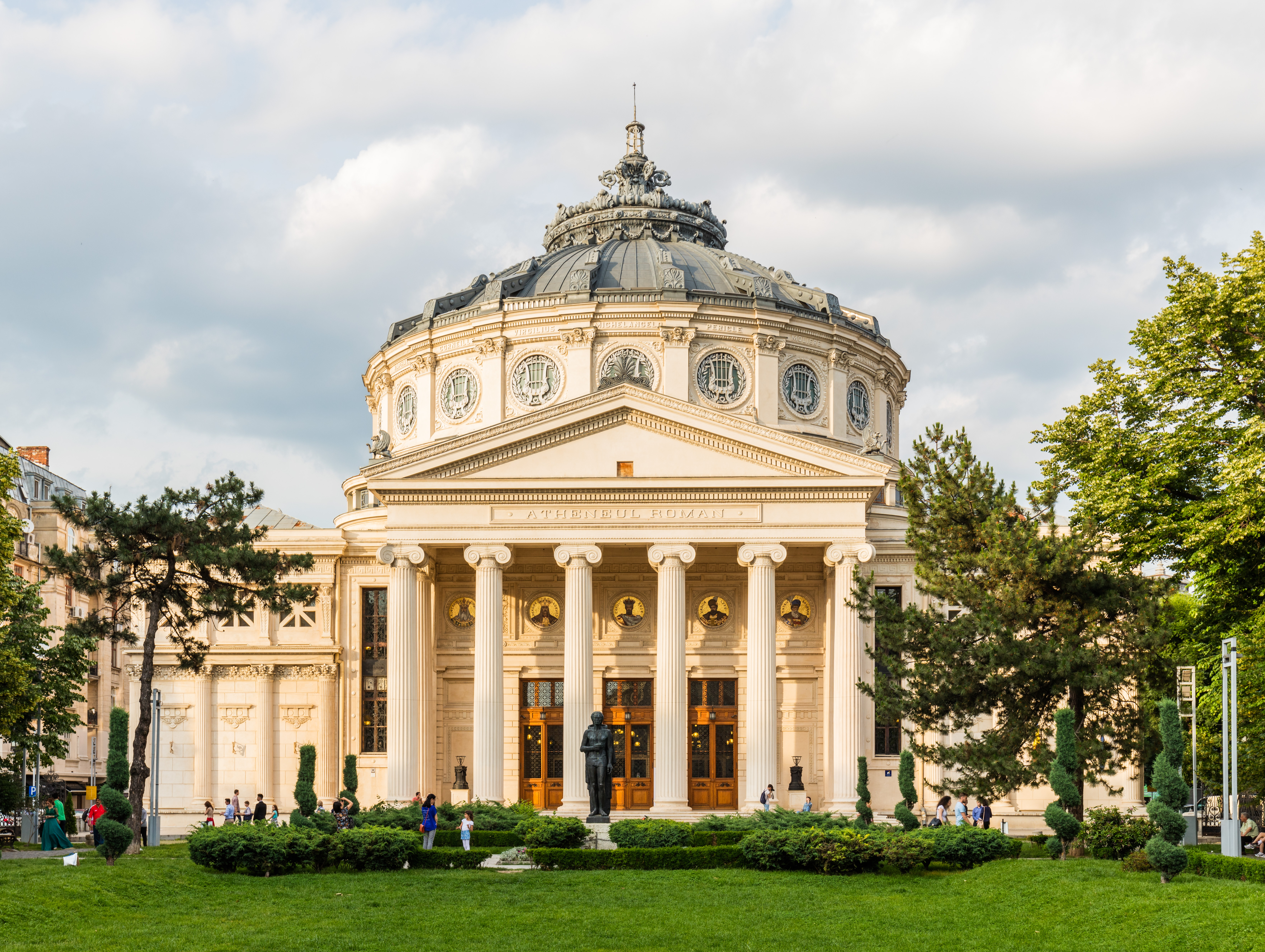
Romanian Atheneum

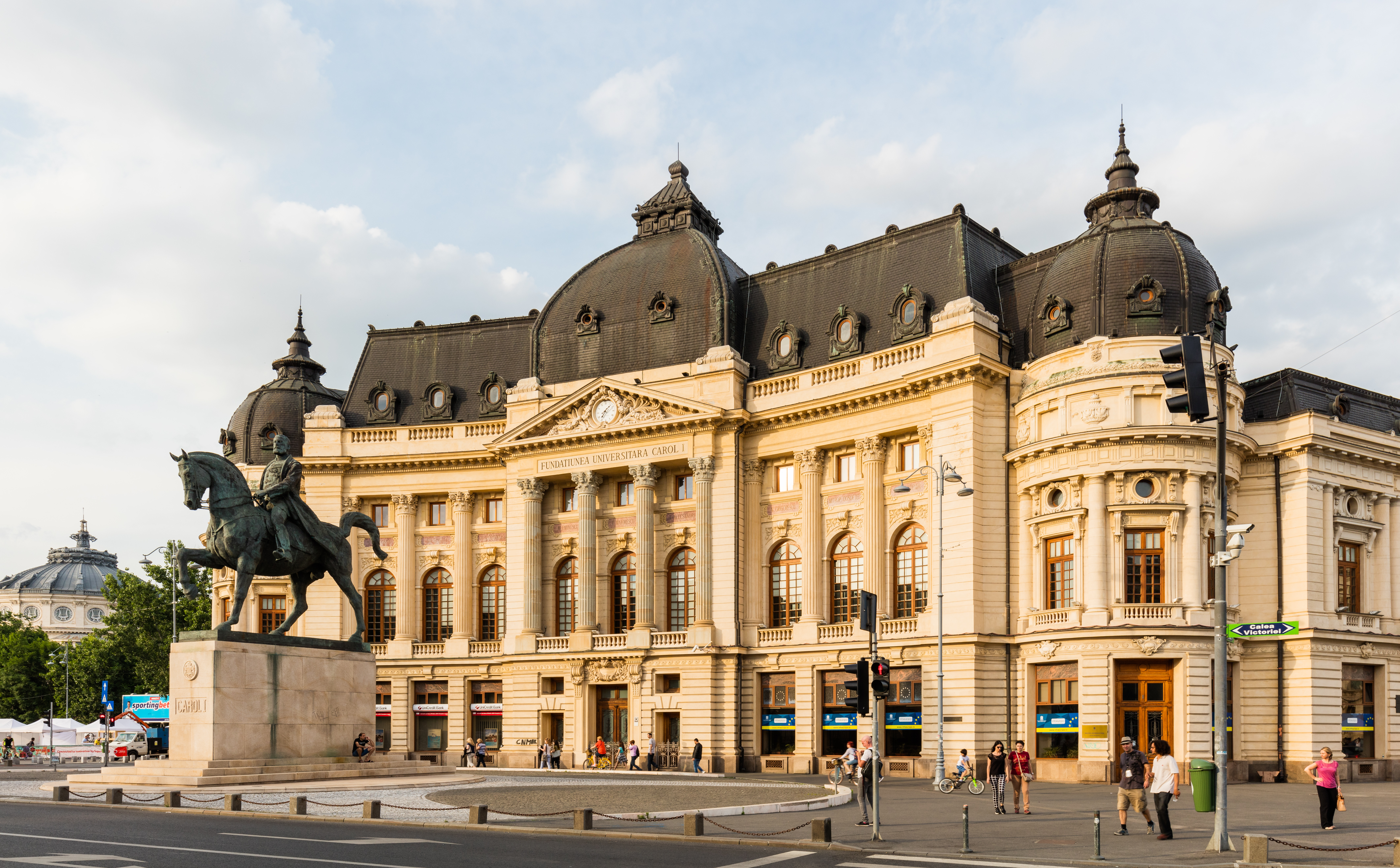
Central University Library

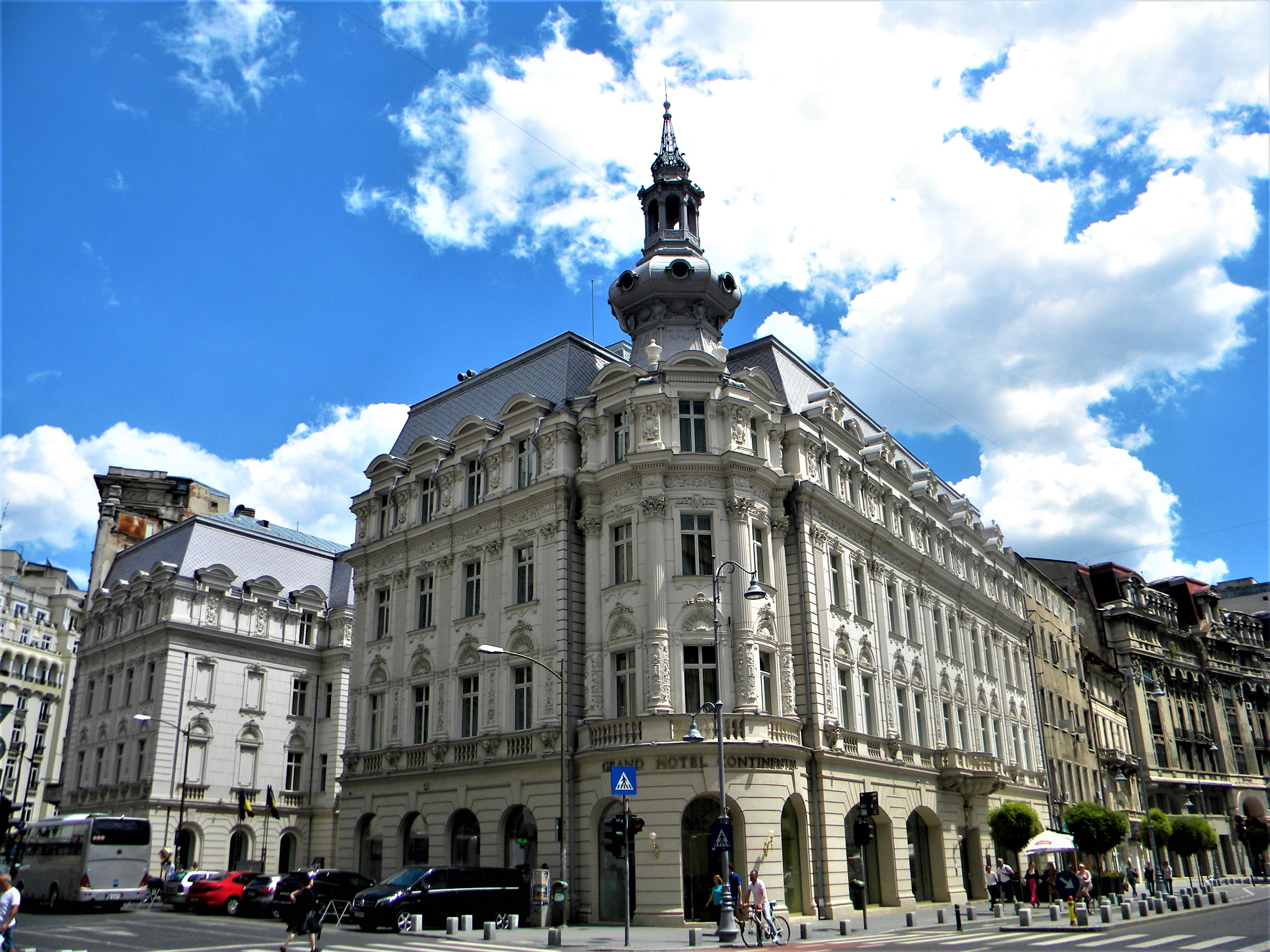
Grand Hotel Continental

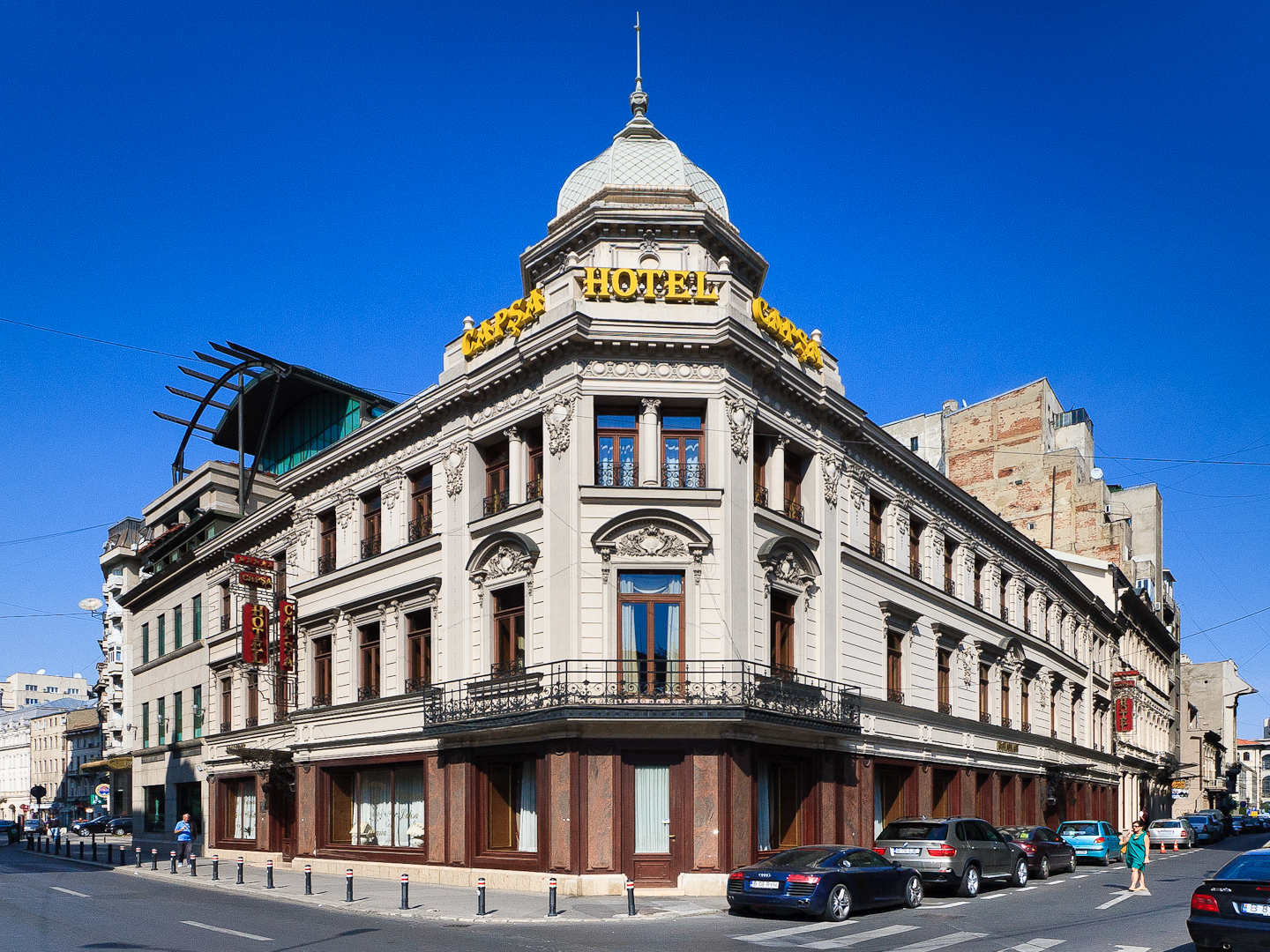
Capșa House

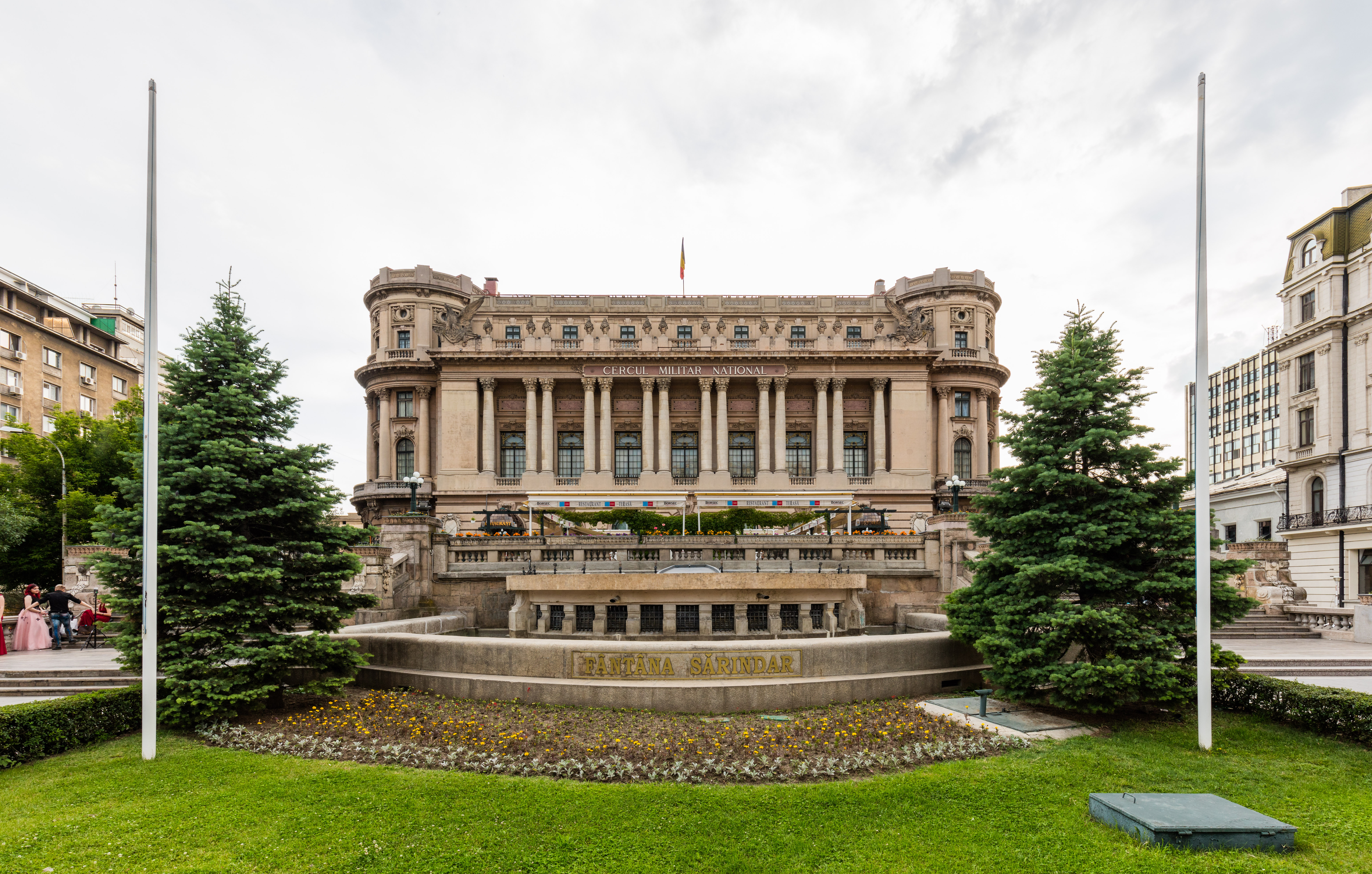
Palace of the National Military Circle

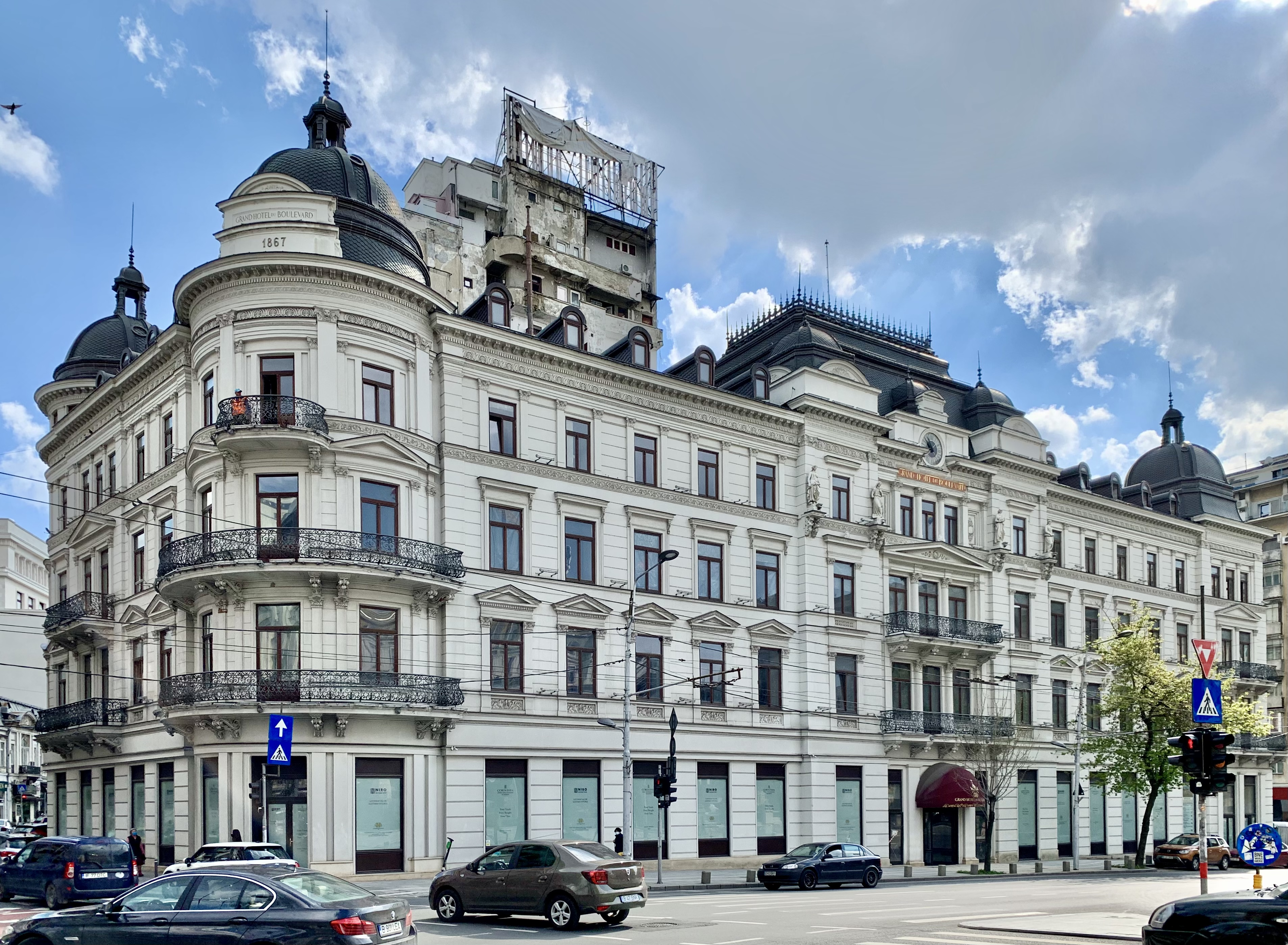
Grand Hôtel du Boulevard

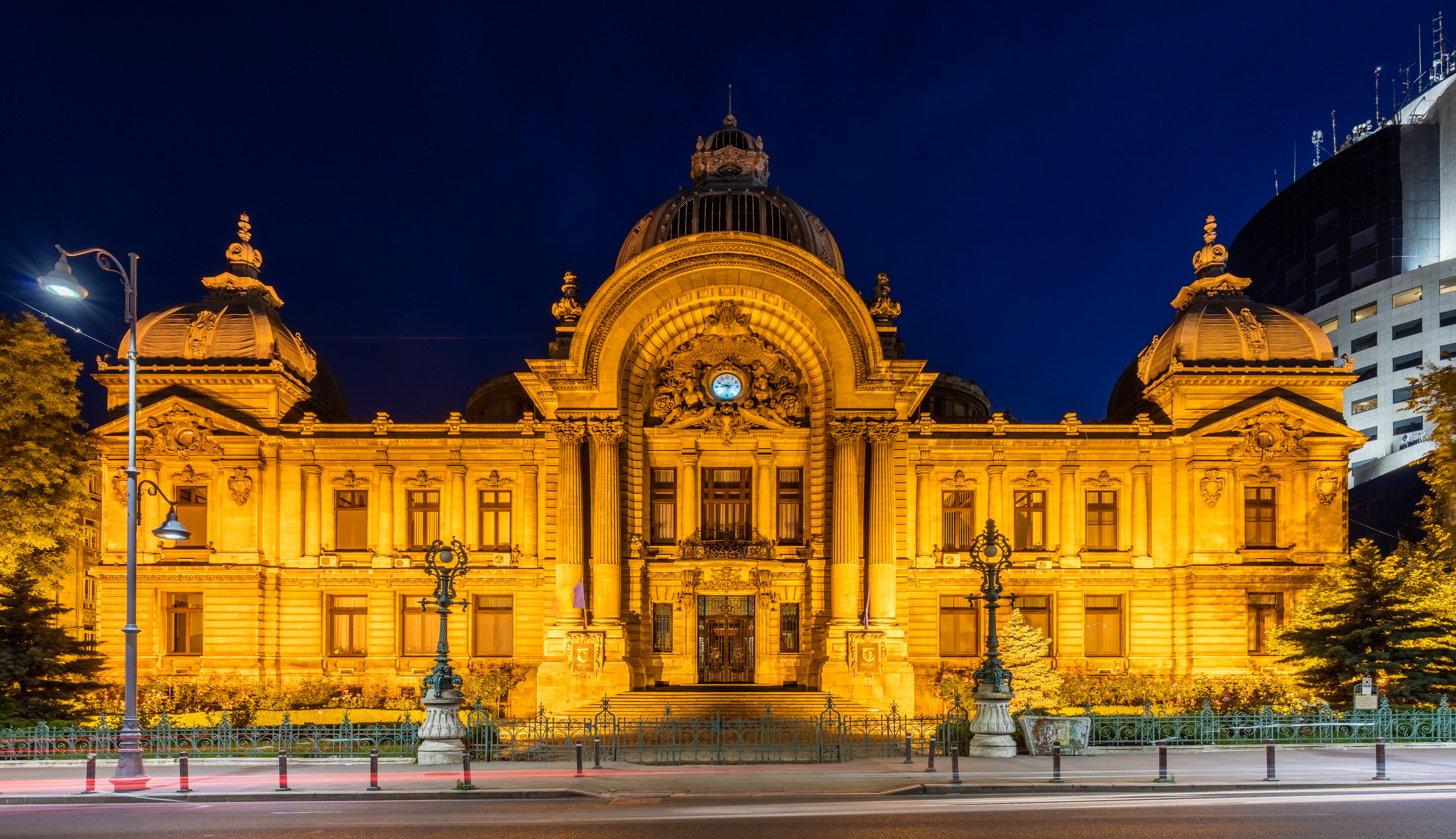
CEC Palace
