= Duiliu =

Duiliu is a Romanian-language masculine given name. Notable people with the name include:

- Duiliu Marcu (1885–1966), Romanian architect
- Duiliu Zamfirescu (1858–1922), Romanian novelist and poet
