= Victoria Palace =

Coordinates: 44°27′10.43″N 26°5′14.29″E

Victory Palace
- Palatul Victoria
- Interactive map of the Victory Palace area

General information
- Type: Governmental
- Architectural style: Stripped Classicism
- Location: 1 Victory Square, Sector 1, Bucharest, Romania
- Current tenants: Government of Romania, Cabinet offices
- Construction started: 1937
- Completed: 1944
- Inaugurated: 1952
- Client: Ministry of Foreign Affairs
- Owner: Government of Romania

Technical details
- Floor count: 3

Design and construction
- Architect: Duiliu Marcu

The Victoria Palace (Romanian: Palatul Victoria) is a government building on the large Victory Square (Piața Victoriei) in Bucharest, housing the Prime Minister of Romania and his cabinet.

The Victory Palace was designed in 1937 to house the Foreign Ministry, and nearly complete in 1944. It was designed by architect Duiliu Marcu (1885–1966), who had designed many major buildings in 1920s and 30s Romania, including many major government projects in the 1930s and 40s. The Victory Palace is a stylised monumental classical design, with an arcaded ground level, a long colonnade of slim piers on the main front, and two recessed top floors. The facades were entirely clad in Carrara marble, with reliefs in the panels at either end, and there were generously decorated interiors.

The building suffered heavy damage in the 1944 German bombing of Bucharest in World War II. It then underwent significant restoration and reconstruction works, being reclad in travertine, without the reliefs and less ornate interiors, finally opening in 1952, housing the headquarters of Foreign Ministry and the Council of Ministers.

Following the Romanian Revolution, in 1990 it became the headquarters of the first government of post-communist Romania, a role it still fulfils, housing the office of the Prime Minister of Romania.

The palace was declared a historical monument in 2004.

== See also ==
- Government of Romania
