= Duiliu Marcu =

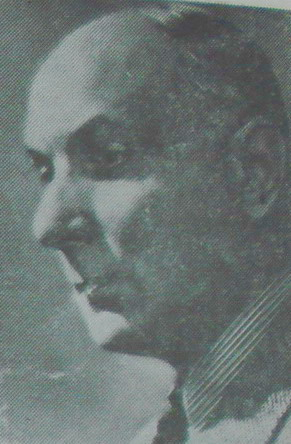
- Architect Duliiu Marcu
- Born: March 25, 1885; Calafat, Kingdom of Romania
- Died: March 9, 1966 (aged 80); Bucharest, Socialist Republic of Romania
- Education: Académie des Beaux-Arts, Paris
- Occupation: Architect
- Years active: 1912–1945
- Notable work: Romanian National Opera, Timișoara; Elisabeta Palace; Athenee Palace Hotel; CFR Palace; Palace of State Monopolies; Military Academy; Victoria Palace

Duiliu Marcu (25 March 1885 – 9 March 1966) was a Romanian architect, one of the most well known and prolific of the interwar period. With a career spanning from 1912 to 1966, he is said to have designed 150 public and private projects across Romania, his work reflecting the evolution of local architecture in the first half of the 20th century from French Renaissance, though Neo-Romanian to modernism. Though also designing private villas and apartments, he designed some of the major interwar public buildings in the country, including the Timișoara Theatre, the Elisabeth Palace in Bucharest for the royal family, and the Victory Palace, which now houses the office of the Prime Minister.

== Biography ==
Born in 1885 in Calafat, a small town on the Danube (now on the border with Bulgaria), Marcu came from a modest family. In 1900 he enrolled in the new Carol I High School in Craiova, where he was awarded special prizes in drawing. In 1905, he decided to attend the School of Architecture in Bucharest, but after only a year he left for Paris, where he studied at the famous École des Beaux-Arts in Paris, graduating in 1912.

Almost immediately he gained prestigious commissions, and by the mid 1930s he was practically the government’s preferred architect.

In his biography which he published in 1960, he divides his career into three phases, which overlap : "works of classical conception", that is academic and eclectic architecture, which stretches from 1912 to 1925; “traditional architectural works”, that is Neo-Romanian architecture between 1920 and 1930; and “works of modern Romanian architecture”, between 1925 and 1960, the year of publication of the work (though he ceased designing in 1945).

After World War II, he continued his teaching and pedagogical activities, having already been Professor of "city aesthetics" at the Higher School of State Sciences in Bucharest (1923-1927) and substitute teacher at the Higher School of Architecture in Bucharest (now the Ion Mincu Architecture University) from 1927, which in 1929 became a professorship, which he held until 1957. He also became president of the Romanian Architects’ Union (1953-1966), and from 1955 a member of the Romanian Academy. He died 9 March 1966 in Bucharest.

== Architecture ==
Constantin Bușilă Residence in Bucharest, 1933

In 1912-1913, his first job on returning from Paris was to work with architect Nicolae Ghica-Budești on the Faculty of Physics and Mathematics addition to the University of Bucharest, in the heart of the city; the design carried on the French Academic classicism of the existing University buildings, with flattened pilasters and prominent dormer windows. His next notable project was the grand Vasilescu Villa, also French Beaux-Arts style, typical for the period before World War I.

By the early 1920s he was practicing in the newly fashionable Neo-Romanian style, beginning with the large commission for the Faculty of Mechanics at the Timișoara Polytechnic, and then applied to another large project, the Timișoara Opera, in 1923-27. Instead of only applying the details of other architects, he made his own study trips, his research focuses especially on the Brancoveanu style, peasant houses in his native region, Oltenia, as well as on the monasteries in Moldova, which explains the presence of Byzantine as well as regional influences in his Neo-Romanian works.

By the early 1930s, along with most Romanian architects, his work was heavily influenced by the modern movement, but often combined with traditional or classical influences. He produced a number of simple cubic villas with a single arched doorway or rustic details, but also some simple streamlined apartment houses. A well known commercial project from this time was the modernisation of the Athenee Palace Hotel in the mid 30s, taking it from pre-war eclectic to a more refined image. The Royal Railway Stations at both Sinaia and Băneasa are elegant, stylised classical pavilions, while the House of State Monopolies in Bucharest is his most daring modern design.

He is best known for designing some of the largest government building projects in Bucharest in the 1930s, employing stylised classical forms influenced by Italian rationalist architecture of the period. They include the CFR (State Railways) Palace, the Military Academy, and finally the huge Victory Palace.

== Selected Projects ==
A full list of his projects can be found at the META page for Diuliu Marcu.

- Faculty of Mathematics, University of Bucharest, 14 Academy Street, 1912–1913.
- Villa CM Vasilescu, 54 Lascăr Catargiu Street, Bucharest, 1915–1916
- Polytechnic of Timișoara, first three buildings: Faculty of Mechanics 1920–1923; dormitory 1927; canteen 1930
- Theater of Timișoara, 1923–1928 (façade 1934-36).
- Dr. Anton Dobrovici House, 40 Lascăr Catargiu Street, 1922–1925
- Union Square, Oradea, (layout, lamps, fences), 1926
- Romanian Pavilion, Barcelona Expo, 1929 (demolished)
- Elisabeta Palace, designed 1930, built 1936–1937
- Bușilă House, 1 Rabat Street, 1932-1933
- Nestor Block, Calei Victoriei, Bucharest, 1932–1934 and 1937–1939 (destroyed by the 1977 Vrancea earthquake)
- Villa Olga Ștefănescu, Sinaia, 1934
- Luca Bădescu House, 1 Muzeul Zambaccian Street, 1934
- Three Apartment buildings, 17, 18, 20, Știrbei Vodă Street, 1935-1937
- Royal Railway Stations, Băneasa, Bucharest, and Sinaia, 1938
- CFR Palace, Gara de Nord, Bucharest, 1934–1937
- Palace of State Monopolies, Calea Victoriei, Bucharest, 1934–1941
- Athenee Palace Hotel, Calea Victoriei Bucharest, 1935–1937 (renovation alteration of the facades)
- Military Academy, 68-72 Șoseaua Panduri, Bucharest, 1937–1939 (now the Carol I National Defence University)
- Victory Palace, Piața Victoriei Bucharest, 1937–1944–1952 (now housing the office of the Prime Minister.)

== Gallery ==
Vasilescu Villa, 1916

Faculty of Mechanics at Timișoara Polytechnic, 1920–1923

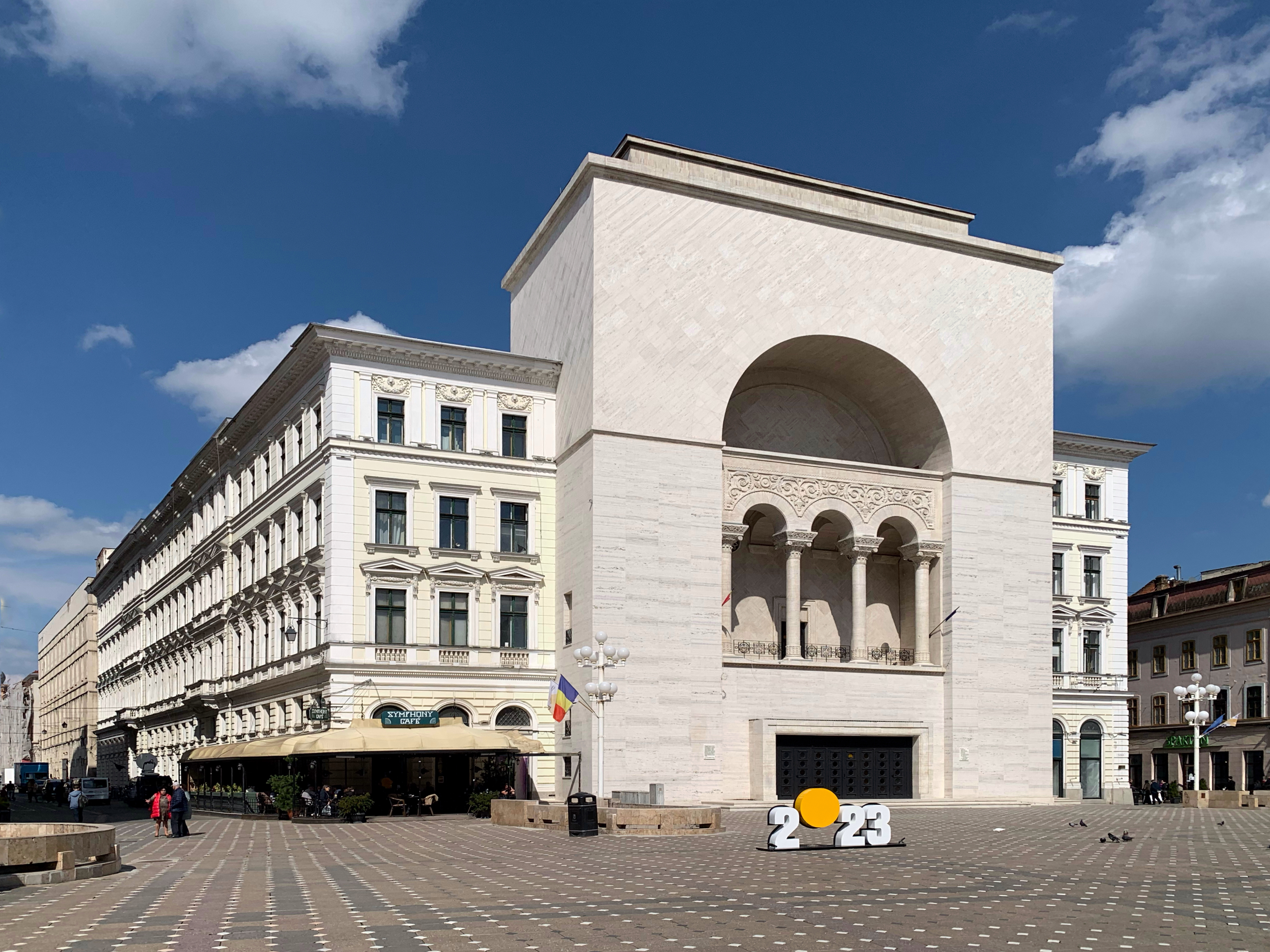
Romanian National Opera, Timișoara, 1923–1928

Casa Dobravici, 1926

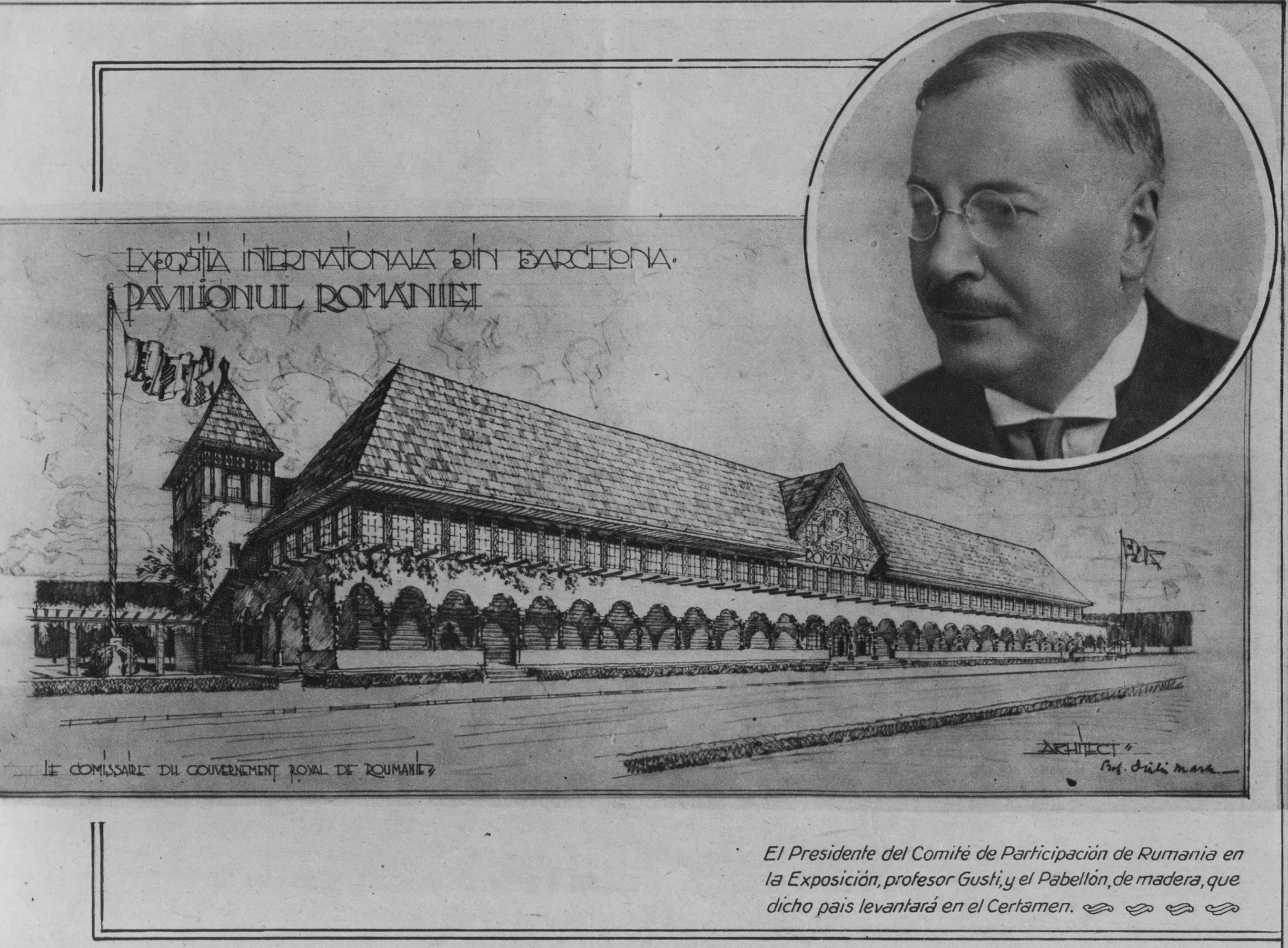
Romania Pavilion, Barcelona Expo, 1929

Athenée Palace, renovation 1937

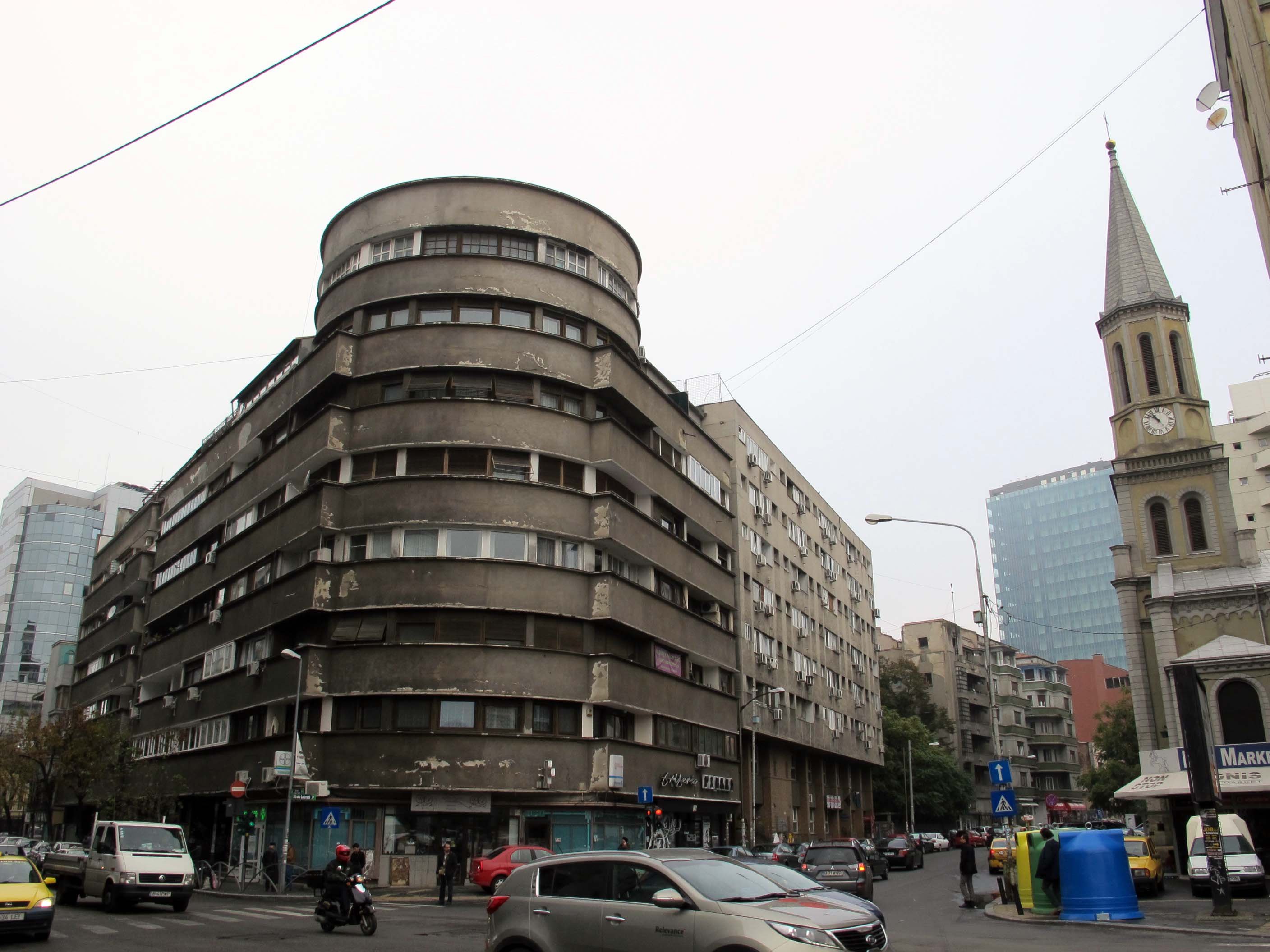
Stoianescu Building, 16 Știrbei Vodă Street, c.1936

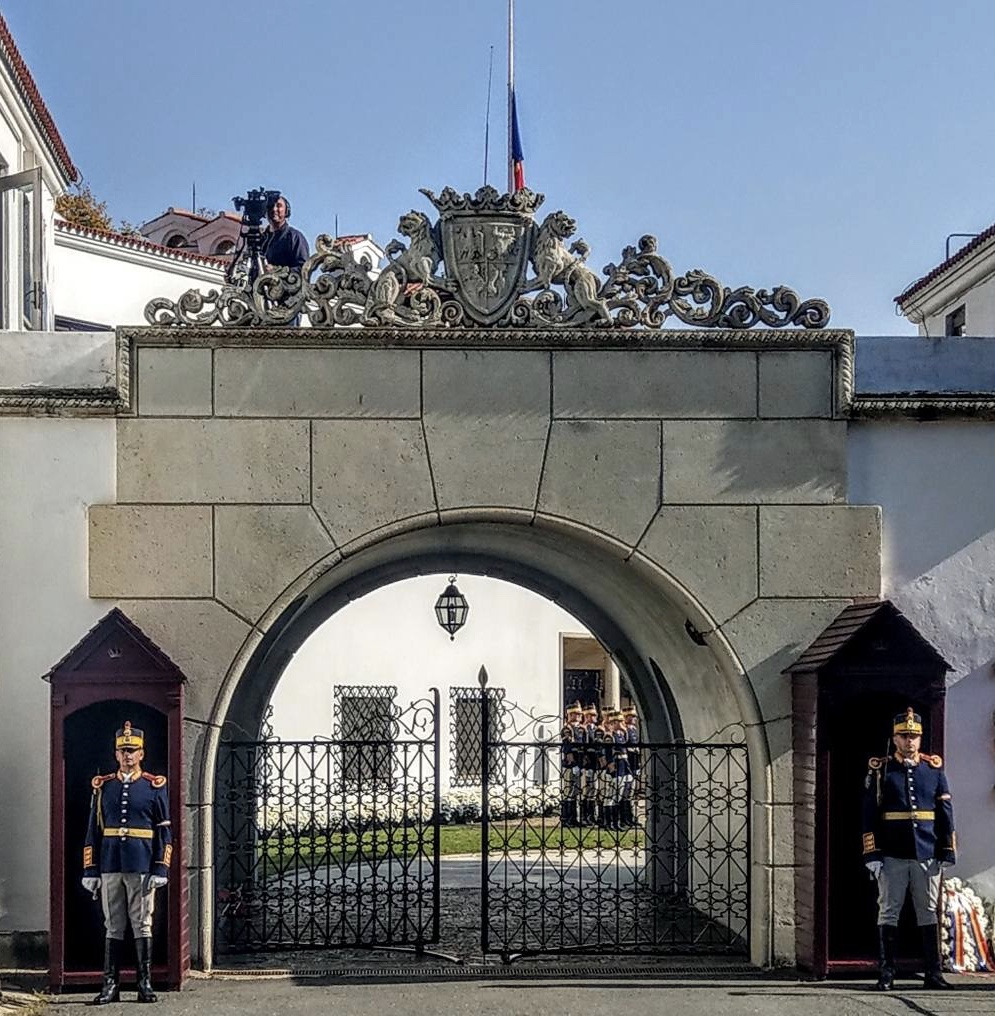
Elisabeta Palace, 1936

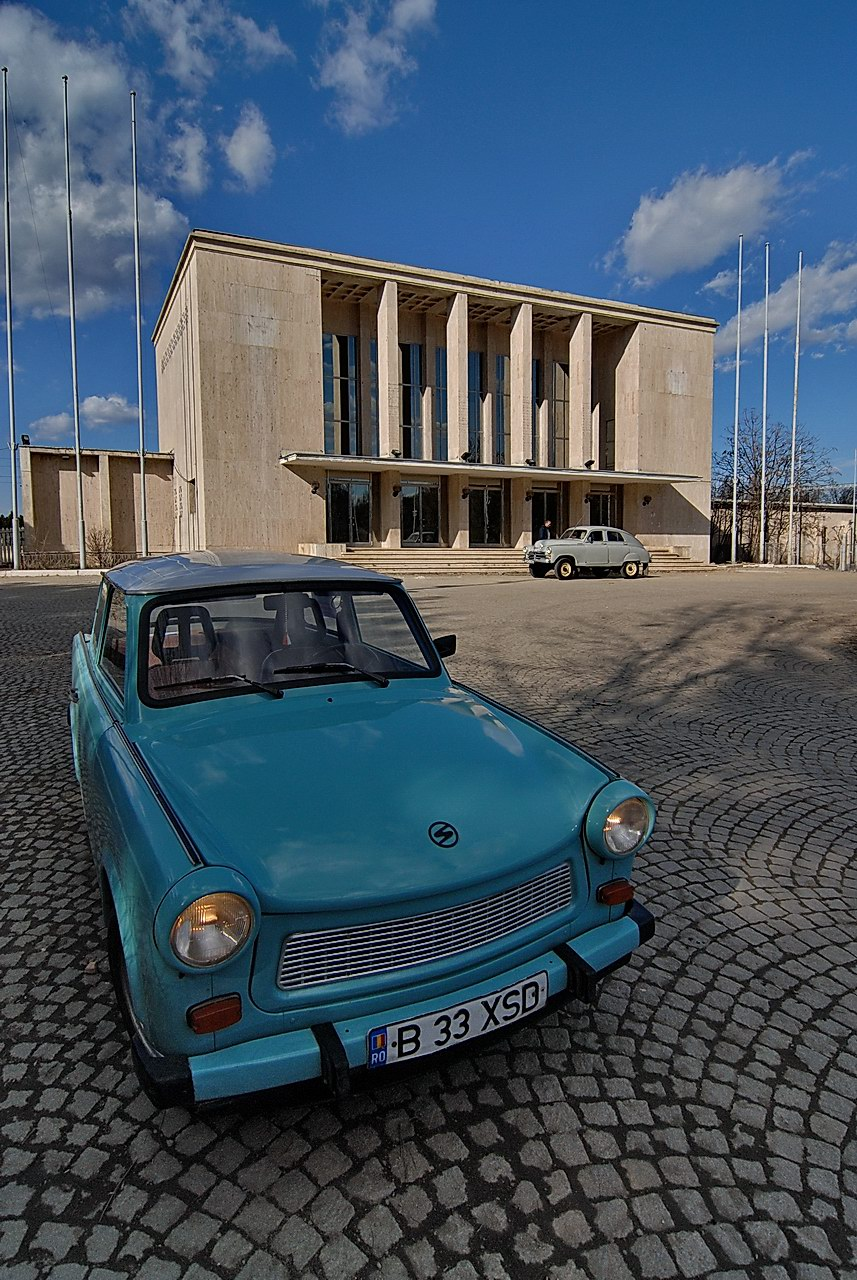
Royal Railway Station, Băneasa, 1938

Military Academy, 1939

Palace of State Monopolies, 1934-1941

Victory Palace

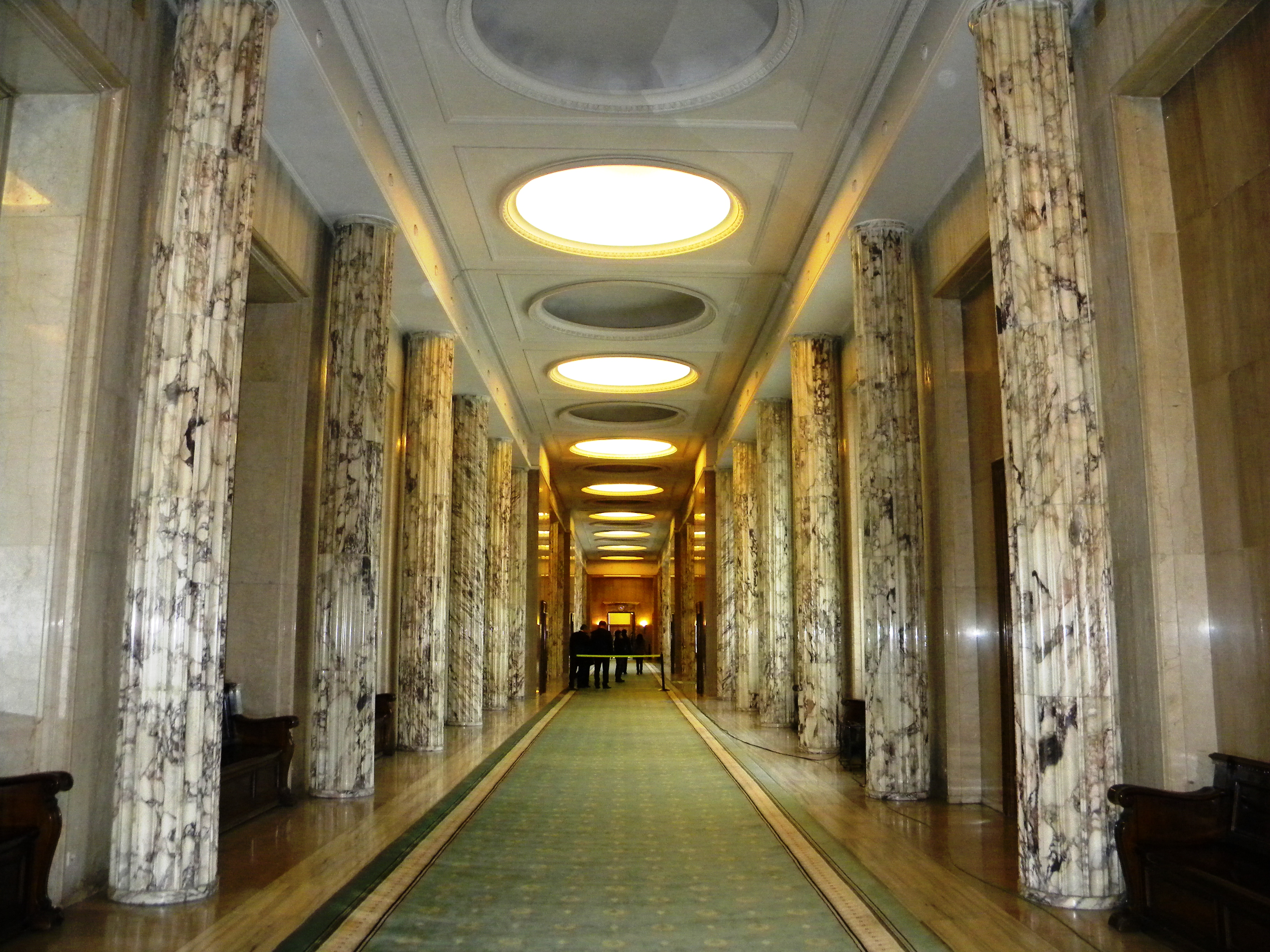
Corridor, Victory Palace
