= InterContinental Athenee Palace Bucharest =

Historic luxury hotel in Bucharest, Romania

InterContinental Athénée Palace Bucharest
- InterContinental Athénée Palace Bucharest

- Location within Romania

General information
- Architectural style: Art Nouveau and Beaux Arts (1914-1935); Art Deco
- Coordinates: 44°26′27.6″N 26°05′44.9″E
- Opening: 1912; 1997 (International Brand)
- Owner: Ana Hotels SA
- Operator: InterContinental Hotels

Height
- Height: 22.93 m (75.2 ft)

Technical details
- Floor count: 7

Design and construction
- Architects: Duiliu Marcu; Théophile Bradeau

Other information
- Number of rooms: 283

Website
- www.atheneepalace-hotel.ro/en/

The InterContinental Athénée Palace Bucharest is a historic luxury hotel in Bucharest, Romania, originally opened in 1914. It was arguably Europe's most notorious den of spies in the years leading up to World War II, and only slightly less so during the Cold War.

== Location ==
Located in the heart of Bucharest on Str. Episcopiei at the corner of Calea Victoriei on the former site of the Han Gherasi (Han is Romanian for "inn"), the hotel faces onto the small park in front of the Romanian Athenaeum on Revolution Square. It did not originally face onto a square: at the time the hotel was built, the space that is now a small park was occupied by the Splendid Hotel, destroyed by bombing on 24 August 1944, and there was a considerable number of other buildings on what is now the square.

== History ==
=== Early years ===
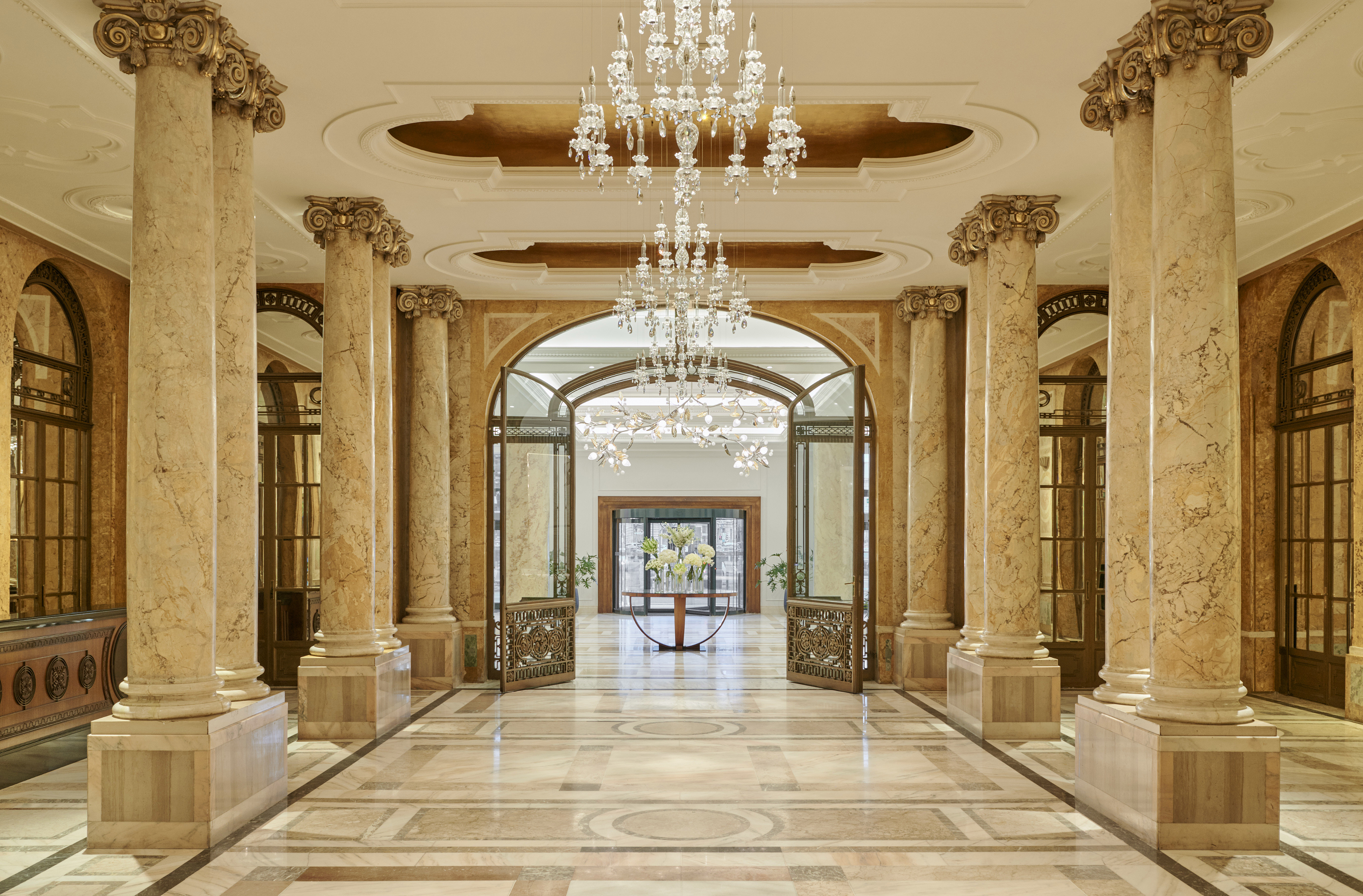
Hotel lobby

The Athénée Palace was designed by the French architect Théophile Bradeau. It was built from 1912 to 1914, in the Art Nouveau style and was one of the last buildings built in this style. It was the first building in Bucharest to use reinforced concrete construction. It was constructed on the site of the 19th century Gherasi Inn. The hotel was completely modernized between 1935 and 1937, to designs by architect Duiliu Marcu, with the exterior redesigned in the Art Deco style.

Describing the hotel as it looked in 1938, A. L. Easterman of London's Daily Express and later of the Daily Herald referred to its "heavily ornate furnishings, marble and gold pillars, great glittering chandeliers, and the deep settees placed well back in the recesses of the lounge as if inviting conspiracy."

The New York Times foreign correspondent C. L. Sulzberger wrote in his memoir A Long Row of Candles that as World War II was approaching, he settled into the Athénée Palace "to enjoy my wait for war… This was a comfortable establishment with excellent service…a corrupt staff always seeking to change a customer's money at black-market rates, and continual competition by ladies of easy or nonexistent virtue to share the warmth of a client's bed." "Countess" R. G. Waldeck wrote of the hotel in the same era, "Here was the heart of Bucharest, topographically, artistically, intellectually, politically—and, if you like, morally." It was also home at the time to both British spies and the Gestapo. A. L. Easterman called it the "most notorious caravanserai in all Europe. …the meeting place of the Continental spies, political conspirators, adventurers, concession hunters, and financial manipulators. " Damaged by American air raids during World War II, in April 1944, the hotel was completely remodeled in 1945.

=== Communist era ===
In 1948, the Athénée Palace was nationalized by the new Communist government, who famously bugged every room, tapped every phone (and every pay phone within 800 metres (0.50 mi)), and staffed the entire hotel with informers. Dan Halpern writes, "The hotel's general director was an undercover colonel in the Securitate's Counterespionage Directorate; the hotel's deputy director was a colonel in the DIE, the Romanian external intelligence organization. The doormen did surveillance; the housekeeping staff photographed all documents in the guests' rooms. The prostitutes in the lobby and in the bar and in the nightclub reported directly to their employers; the free-speaking bons vivants and Romanian intellectuals hanging around the café, not to mention a number of the guests, had been planted."

A new wing was built behind the original hotel in 1965. The project team, comprising architect Nicolae Pruncu and engineers Radu Mircea and Mihai Ionescu, encountered severe technical difficulties in binding the old building with the new one. The hotel's interiors were remodeled in 1983.

The government-run Athénée Palace was damaged in the Romanian Revolution of 1989. Some of the worst violence occurred in the square immediately in front of the hotel. The hotel closed in 1994.

=== Restoration and modern era ===
The Athénée Palace underwent a $42 million renovation from 1995 to 1997, financed by the European Bank for Reconstruction and Development, and reopened in October 1997, managed by Hilton International, as the Athénée Palace Hilton Bucharest. In 2005, Romanian businessman George Copos, through his Ana Hotels entity, purchased a controlling interest in the hotel's ownership company, Athénée Palace SA from the EBRD. In 2021, the hotel rooms in the 1965 "new wing" were fully renovated. The hotel ceased to be operated by Hilton as of midnight 31 December 2022, and joined InterContinental Hotels as the InterContinental Athénée Palace Bucharest on 1 January 2023.

== In media ==
The hotel is a primary setting in Olivia Manning's Balkan Trilogy, which was later filmed as the 1987 BBC miniseries Fortunes of War, starring Kenneth Branagh and Emma Thompson. The miniseries was not shot at the hotel, but in Yugoslavia.
