= Victory Square, Bucharest =

Square in Bucharest, Romania

Victory Square
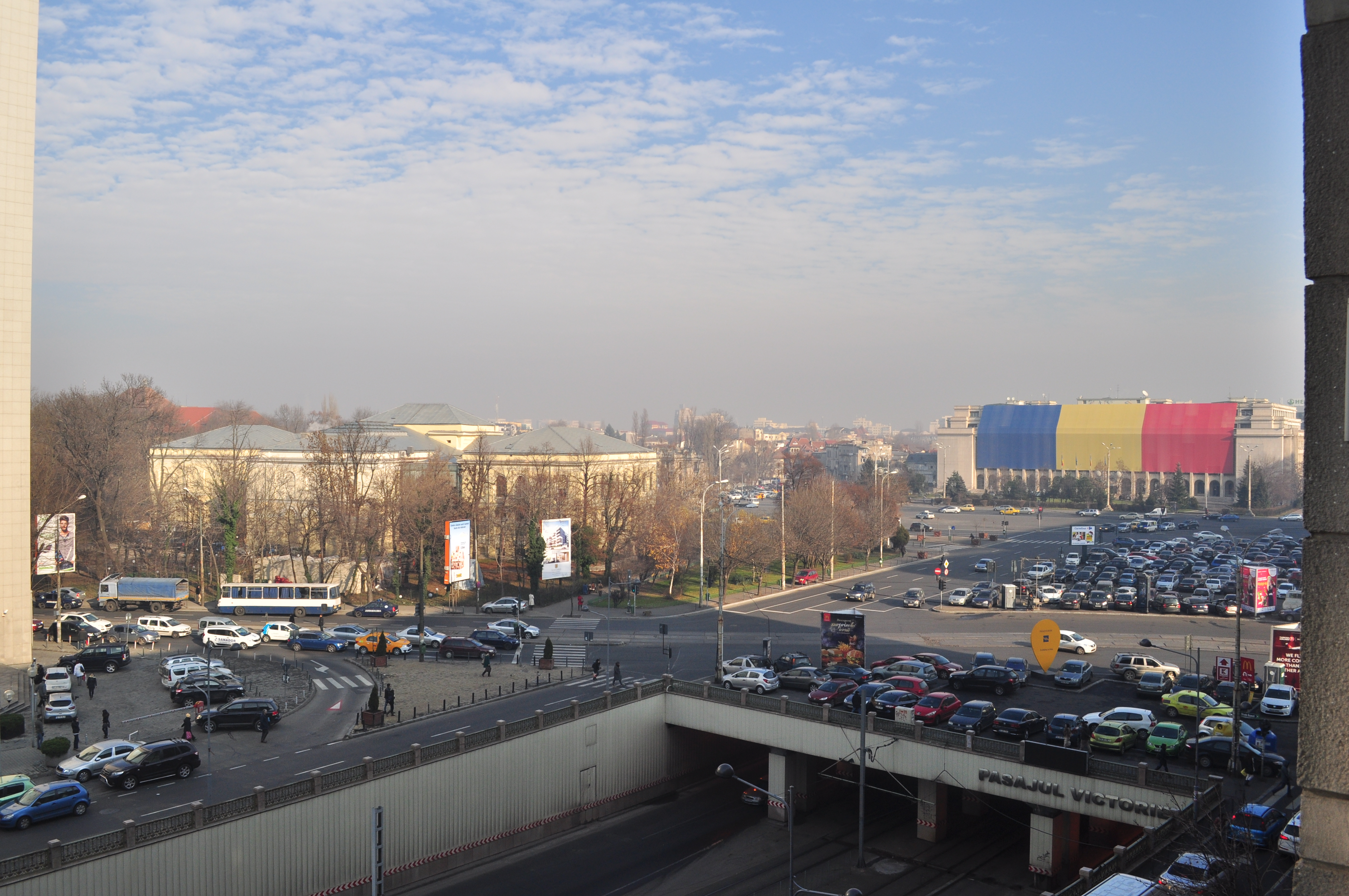

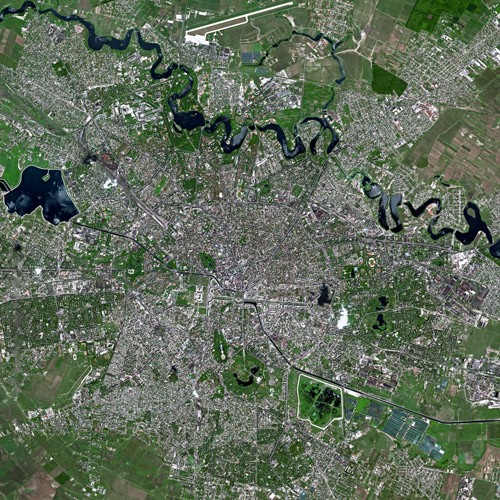
- Location within Bucharest, Romania
- Quarter: Victoriei
- Coordinates: 44°27′10″N 26°05′09″E

Victory Square (Romanian: Piața Victoriei, pronounced [ˈpjat͡sa vikˈtori.ej]) is one of the major public squares in Bucharest, Romania, an intersection where Calea Victoriei, Lascăr Catargiu Boulevard, Iancu de Hunedoara Boulevard, Kiseleff Boulevard, Ion Mihalache Boulevard, and Nicolae Titulescu Boulevard cross.

== History ==
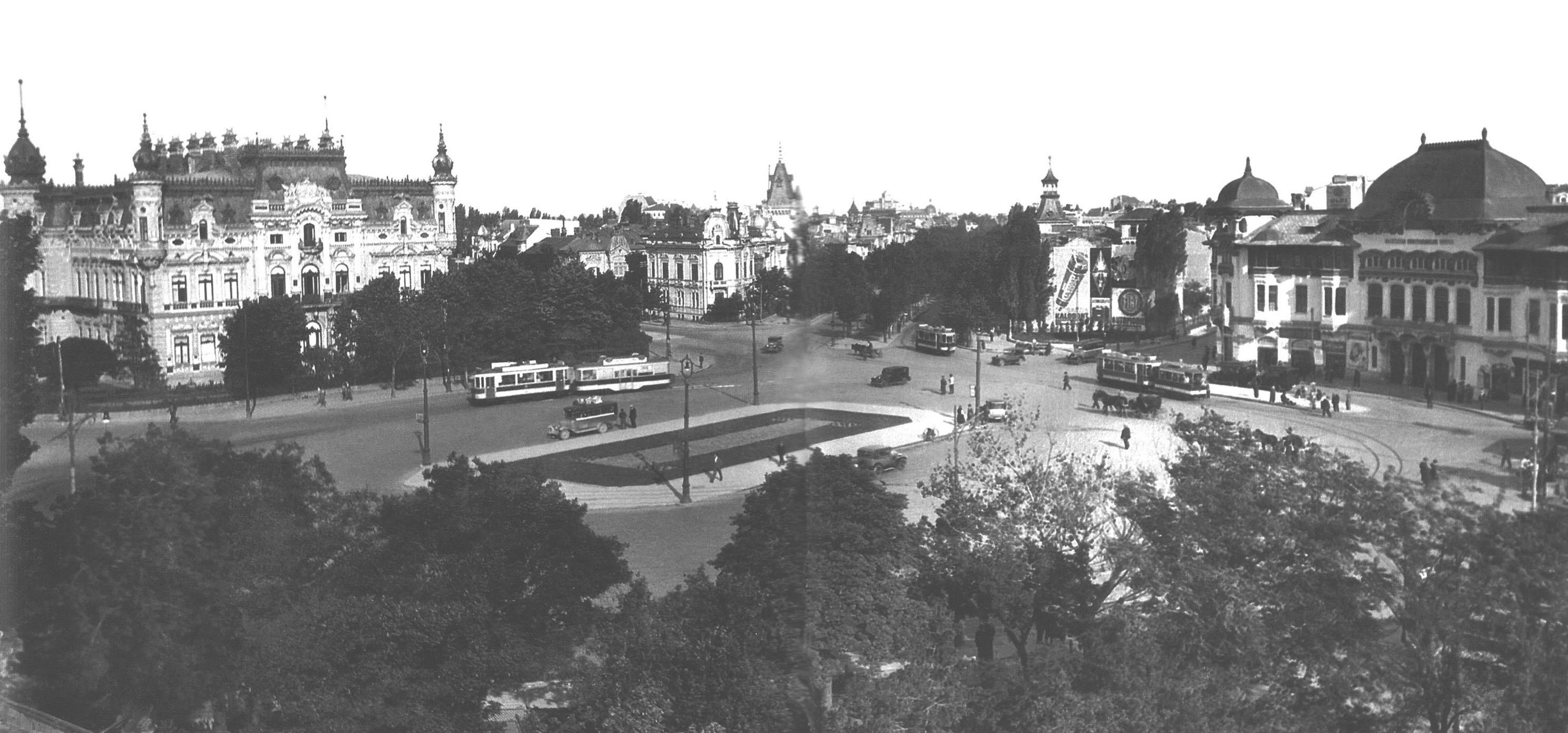
The square during the interwar period. In the left: the Sturdza Palace (1898-1901) by Iulius Reinicke, on the right: the Building of the Public Officials Association (1900) by Nicolae Mihăescu

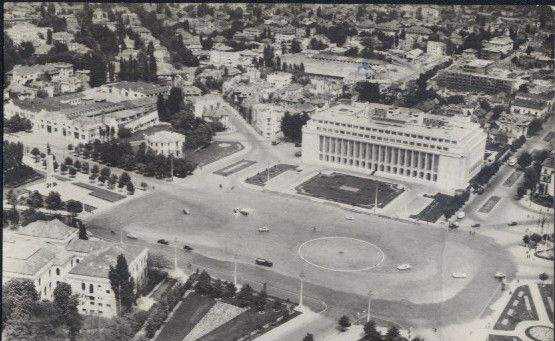
Victory Square after WW2 bombardments, during the Communist period

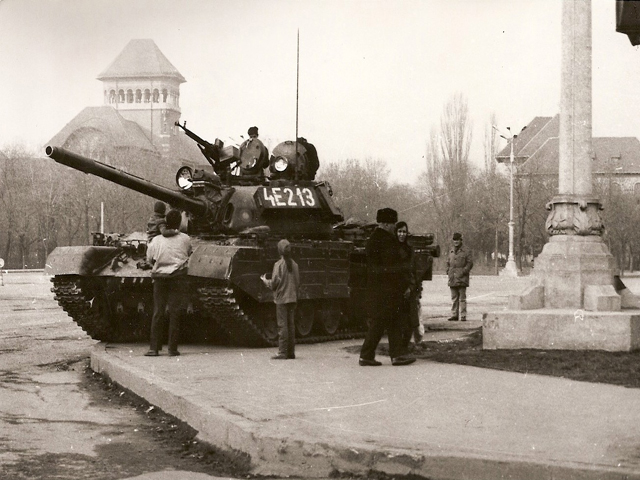
A TR-85 tank in Victory Square during the Romanian Revolution of December 1989

The Victory Square received its name in 1878, although it appeared in maps fifty years earlier, when the Kiseleff Road was cut. Initially, the square had an almost circular shape, edged by public buildings, the Antipa Museum (the western side), the Sturdza Palace (the eastern side), and the Building of the Public Officials Association (the southern side), the last two no longer existing. During the interwar period, the Victoria Palace is added in the Square, right behind the Sturdza Palace.

On 24 and 25 August 1944, during World War II, after Romania started to fight together with the Allies in the wake of the coup d'état of 23 August, some buildings with important functions were bombarded by Nazi Germany, and destroyed partially or totally. Two main bombardment points were the Victory Square and the Revolution Square (known at that time as the Royal Palace Square), because the Victoria Palace was the Foreign Ministry at that time, a very important institution. Unfortunately, the Sturdza Palace and the Building of the Public Officials Association were heavily damaged by the bombardments. After the war, the square changed significantly. It more than doubled its area: the esplanade of the Victoria Palace was created where the Sturza Palace stood, and a little park was created where the Society of Civil Servants Building was. The south side of the square was reoccupied in the late 1980s, during the Nicolae Ceaușescu regime with massive housing blocks, similar to the ones from the new Civic Centre.

Today, the square is known for its proximity to major office towers and government buildings. The main government building dates back as far as 1937, when construction work for it started, but it was only completed in 1950. In 1987, the neighboring apartment buildings and Victoria Underpass were built; the underpass was completed sometime in 1987–1989 and the apartment buildings in 1992–1994.

== Important public buildings ==
=== Victoria Palace ===
The facade of the Victoria Palace

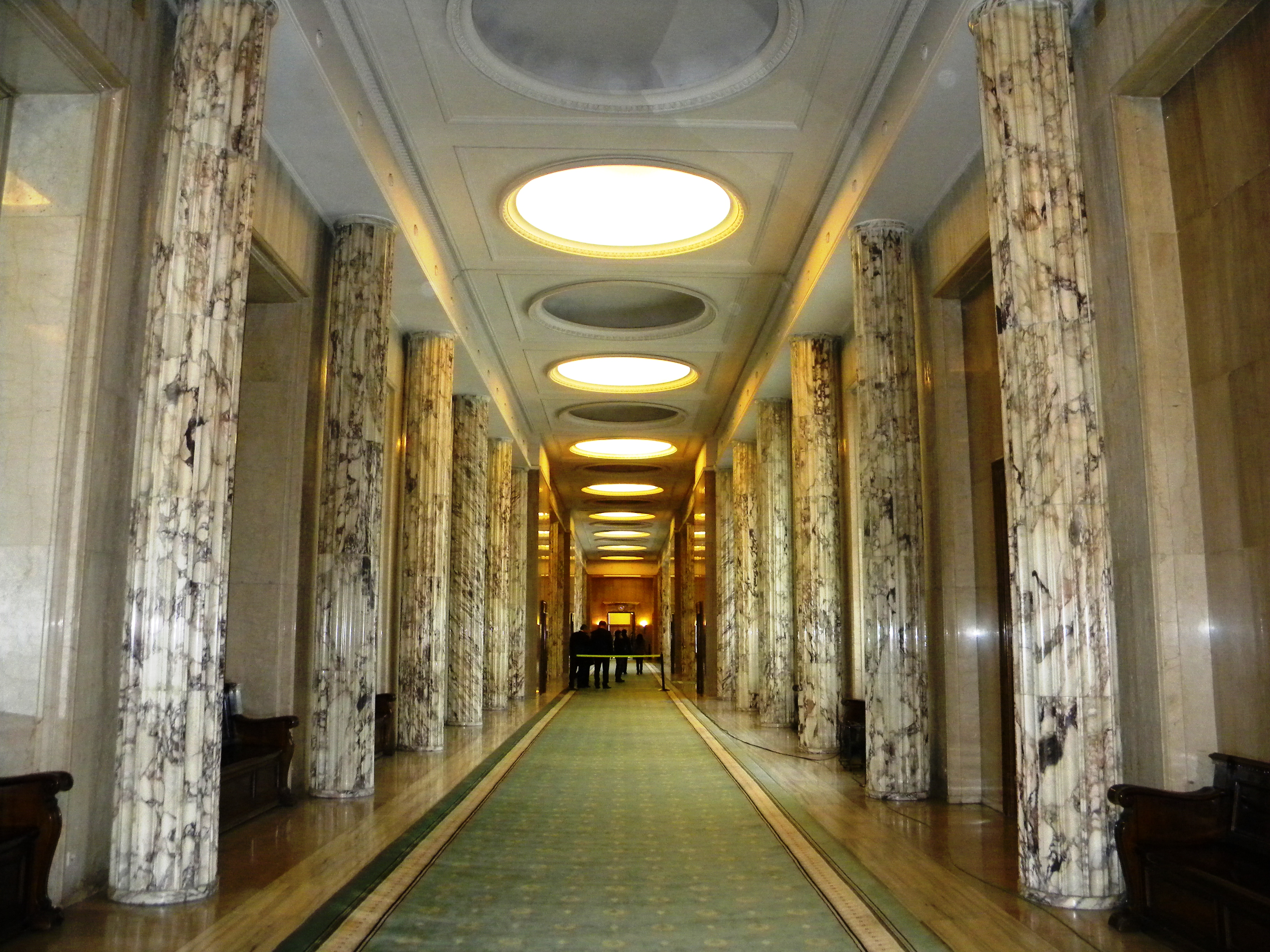
Interior of the palace

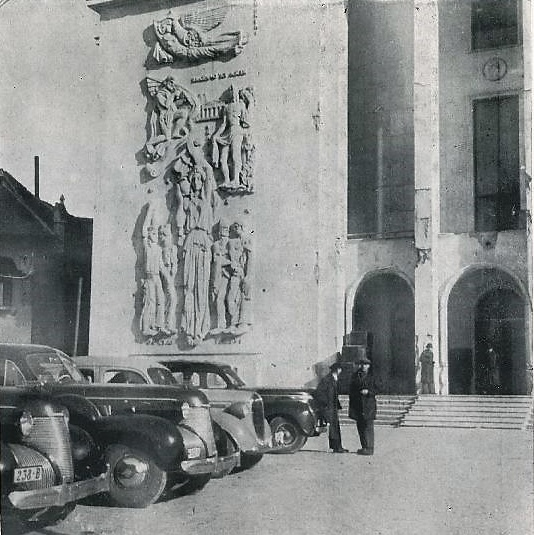
Relief on the main facade of the palace (northern part) by Mac Constantinescu

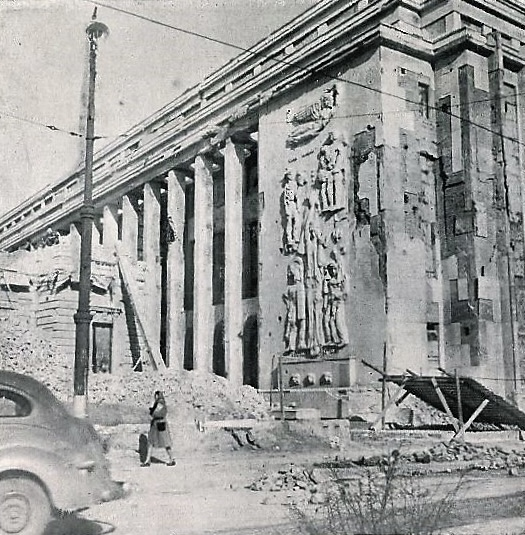
Relief on the main facade of the palace (southern part) by Mac Constantinescu. Under the relief, there was a decorative fountain with three mascarons

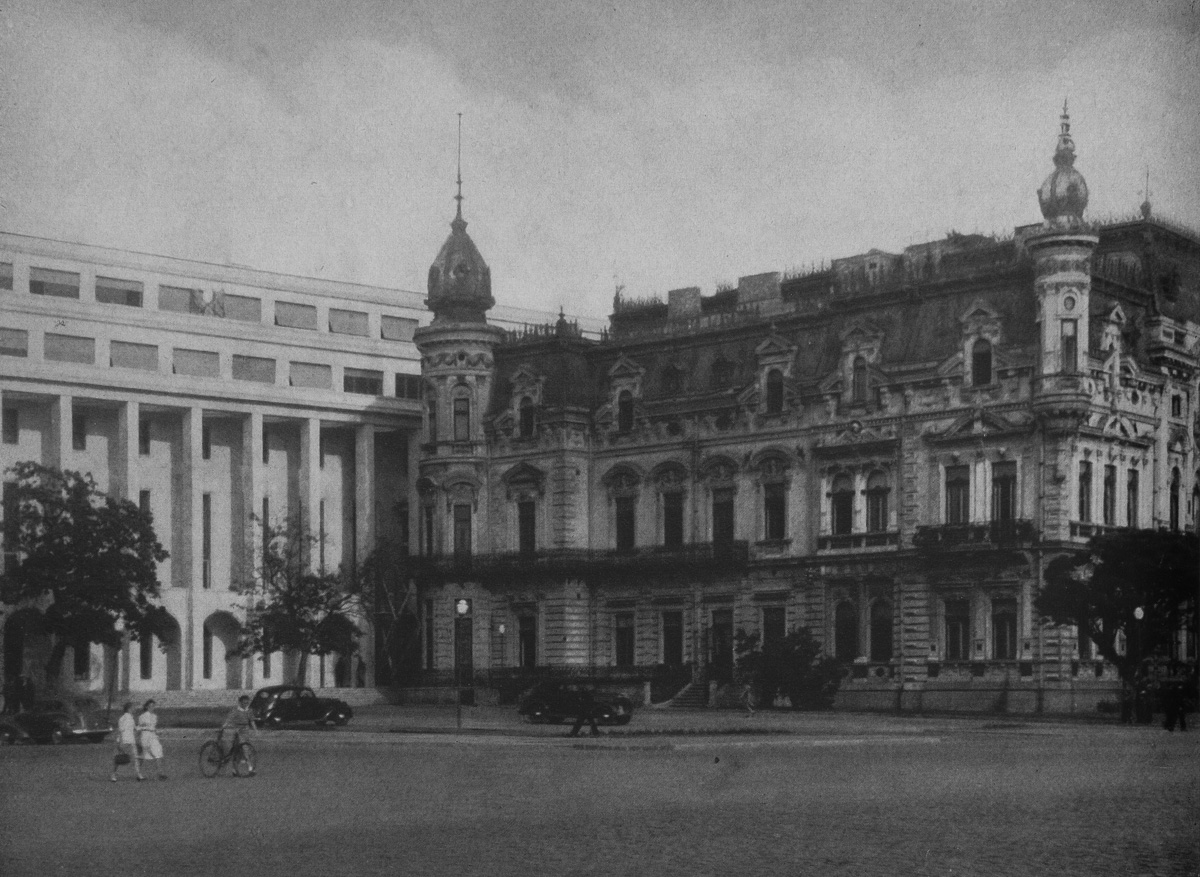
Photo made before the 1944 bombardments, with the Victoria Palace (left) and the Sturdza Palace (right). This picture shows that the two buildings coexisted, and that today, the Victoria Palace isn't in the place of the Sturdza Palace as some sources might say

Despite now being the seat of the Romanian Government, the Victoria Palace was originally designed to house the Foreign Ministry. It was built between 1937 and 1947, in the Stripped Classicist style, after the plans by Duiliu Marcu. Stylistically, it is inspired by the architecture promoted by far right regimes from Italy and Germany, very similar to the Mussolini-era Italian Rationalism. It was planned to represent the power of King Carol II and his dictatorial regime (1938-1940), destined to be the Royal Ministry of Foreign Affairs (Romanian: Ministerul Regal al Afacerilor Străine).

Initially, the façade were plated with Carrara marble. The main one, towards square, included a colonnade of 19 arches and two lateral panels with reliefs. These were carved by Mac Constantinescu in Carrara marble. Each panel was 15 m high and was made of three layers of reliefs with allegorical characters and Latin texts: agriculture and commerce, culture, geography and history, inventiveness and ingenuity, abundance. Under each panel, there was a decorative fountain, ornamented with three mascarons and some coats of arms of the historic provinces of Romania. Besides the Victoria Palace, Mac Constantinescu also made a metal frieze showing the history of Romanians for the Romanian pavilion of the 1939 New York World's Fair. He also produced costumes and stage designs for opera and ballet.

The palace (which was in construction in 1944, almost finished) was heavily damaged by the United States Air Force bombardments from 4 April 1944. The resistance structure and the reliefs on the façade were very affected. Until 1952, the façades and the interiors were consolidated, under the supervision of the architect of the building, Duiliu Marcu. However, the façade is plated with travertine, and the reliefs and fountains no longer appear.

=== Grigore Antipa Museum of Natural History ===
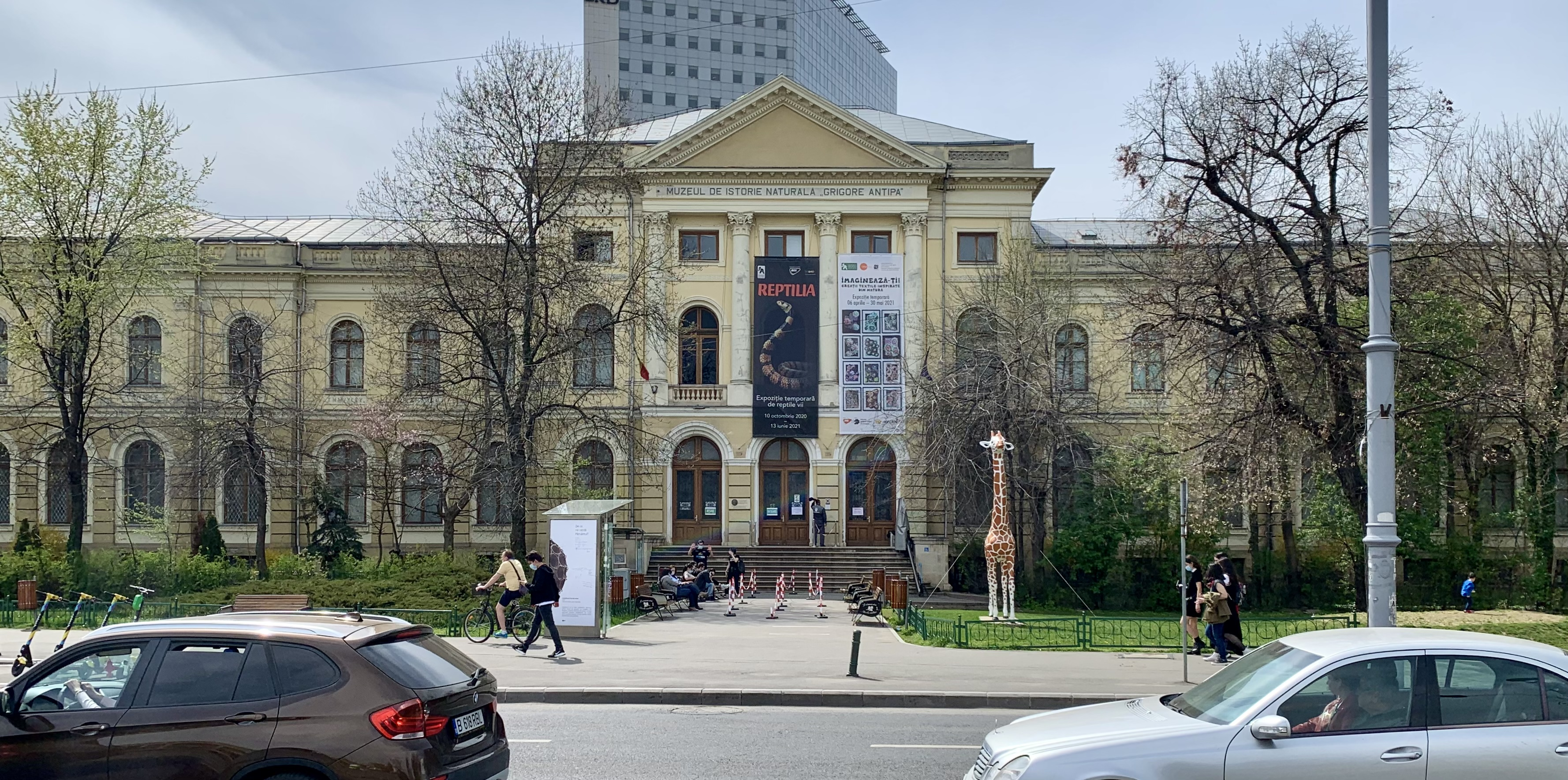
Present-day photo of the facade

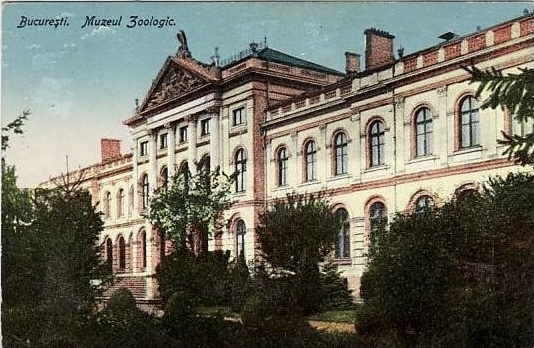
Belle Époque photo of the museum. Notice how there was a relief in the pediment and how its corners were decorated

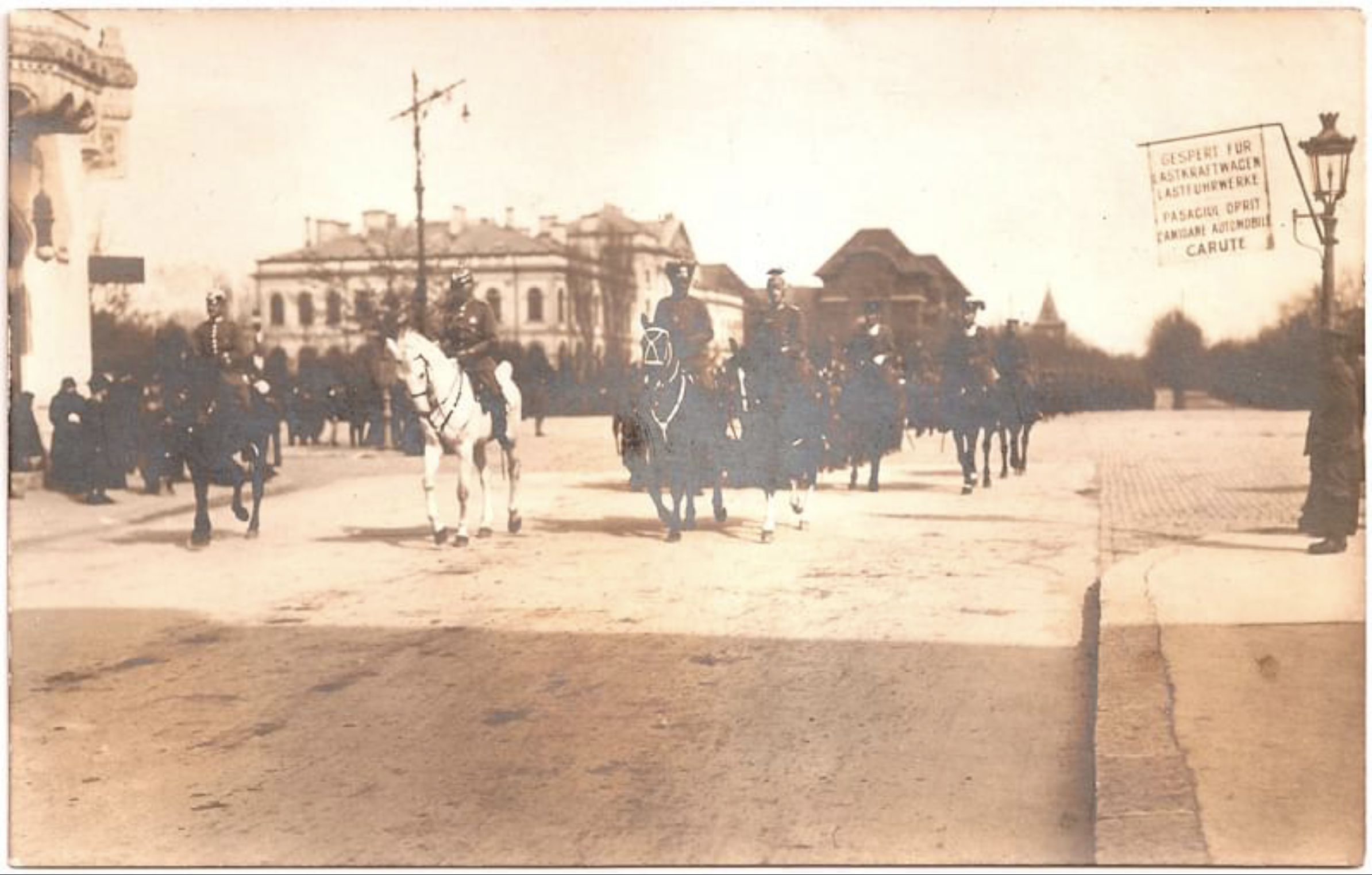
Victory Square in 1917, under the occupation of the Central Powers, with the Antipa Museum in the background

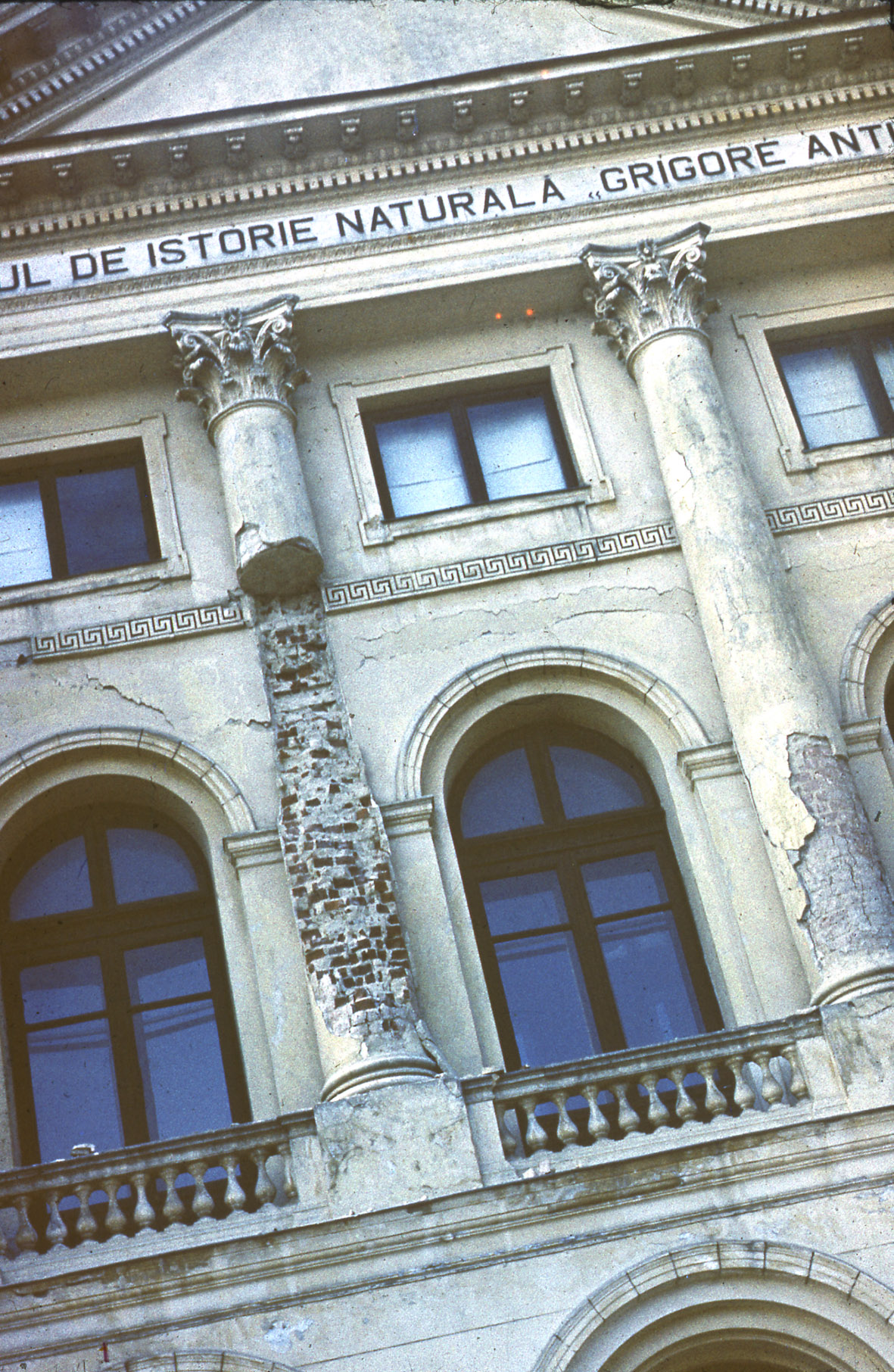
Columns on the facade, damaged by the 1977 Vrancea earthquake

The museum was founded in 1834 as the antiques, art, and natural curiosities cabinet of the Saint Sava Academy. It became a natural history museum at the beginning of the 20th century. The Neoclassical building was erected between 1903 and 1906, after the plans of architect Grigore Cerkez and engineer Mihai Rosco. During the late 1990s and the 2000s, the museum was renovated, consolidated and redesigned.

== Office buildings ==
Here is a list of some of the tallest office buildings:

- Bucharest Tower Center, the second tallest building in Bucharest and Romania.
- BRD Tower, one of the tallest buildings in Bucharest.

== Future plans ==
There are plans to replace the parking lot opposite of Victoria Palace with a statue of Maxim Pandelescu, a general in the Romanian Army during World War II, as well as an anti-communist guerrilla leader.
