= Băneasa railway station =

Railway station in Bucharest, Romania

Coordinates: 44°29′7.00″N 26°4′31.00″E

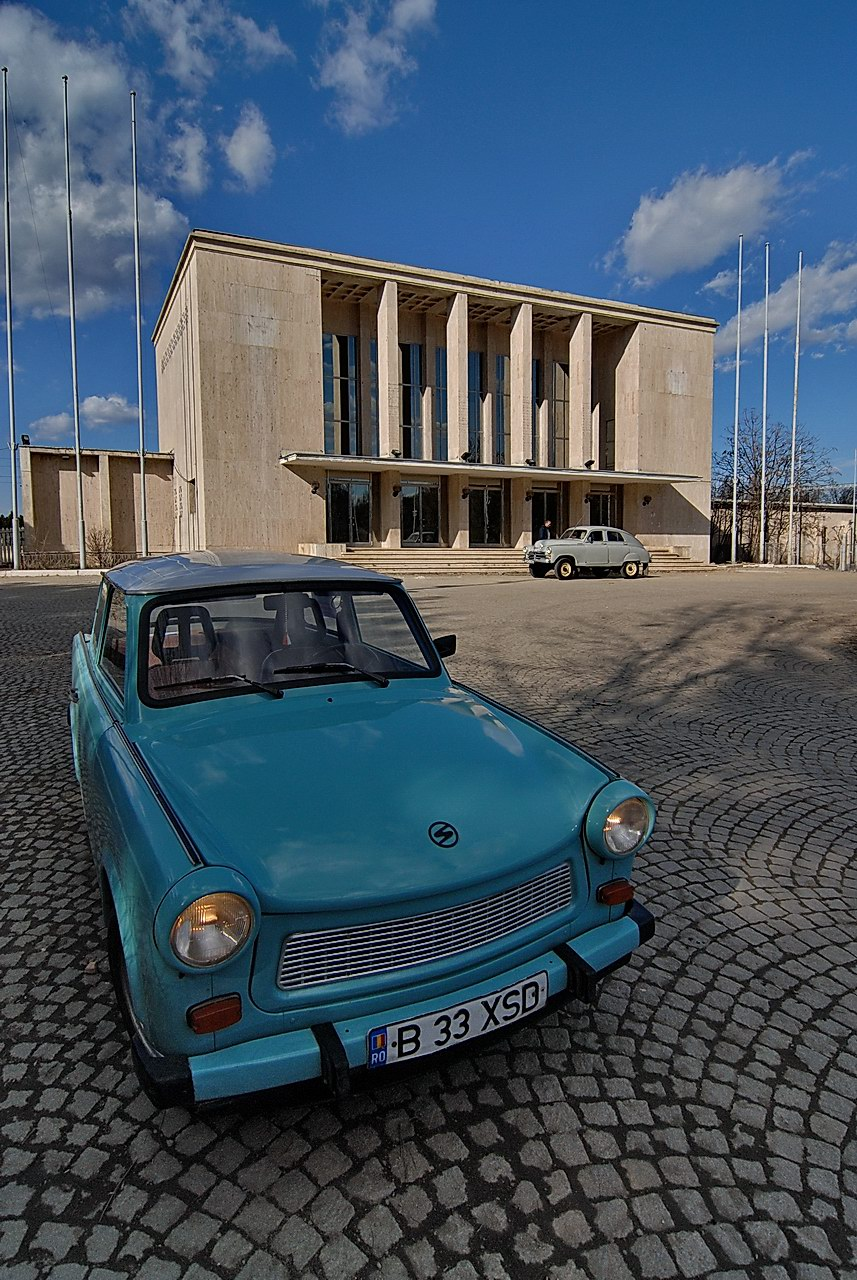

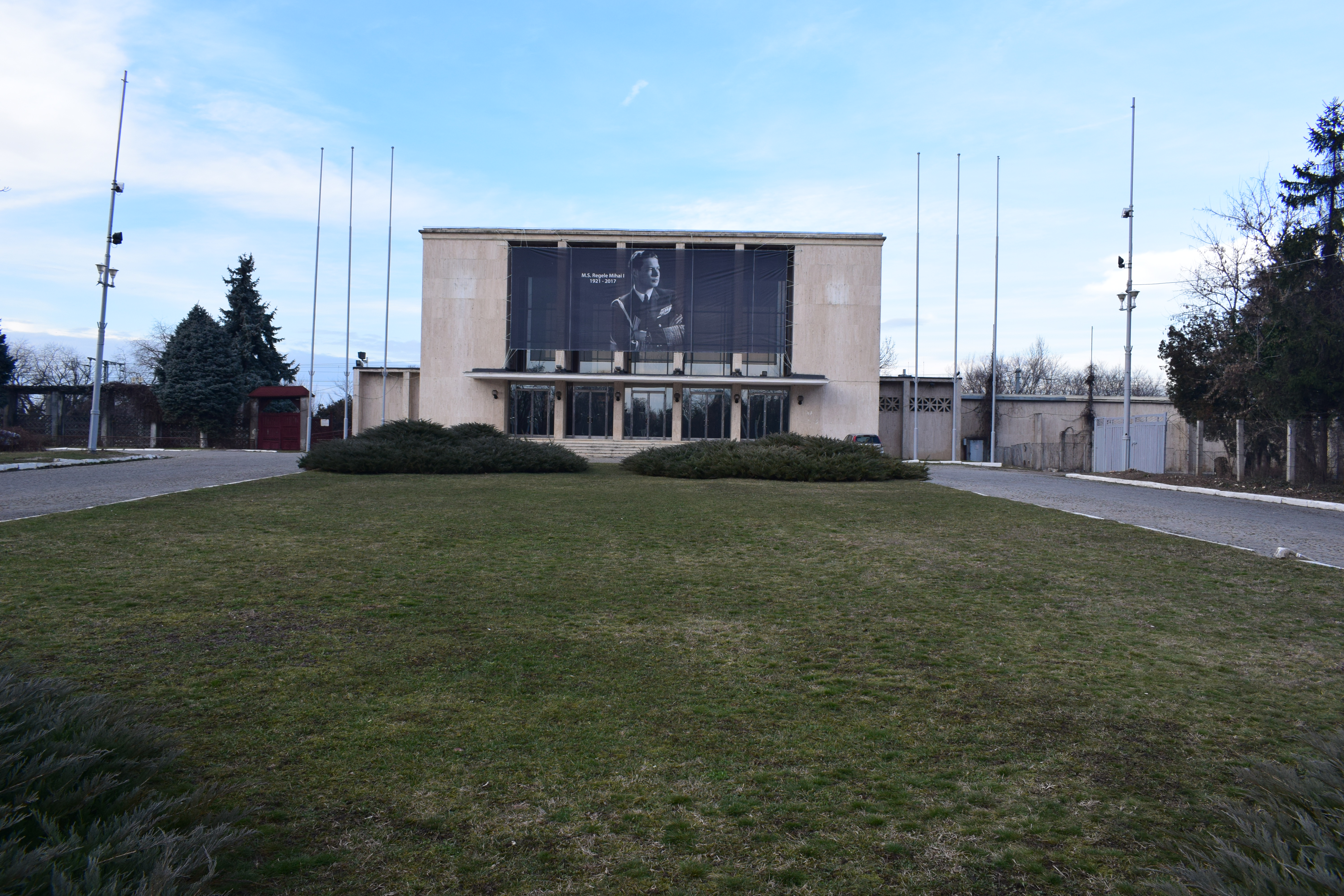
The façade of Băneasa Royal Railway Station, covered by the photo of King Michael I, two weeks after the funeral

Băneasa railway station is a railway station in Băneasa borough of Bucharest, Romania, in the northern part of the city. It is situated on the main line to the Black Sea coast.

The railway station was inaugurated on 17 November 1886, under the name Gara Mogoșoaia. Traditionally, the railway station is used for the Royal departures and arrivals in the Royal Train; recently, on 16 December 2017, this was the departure point for King Michael I's funeral train to the Royal necropolis in Curtea de Argeș.

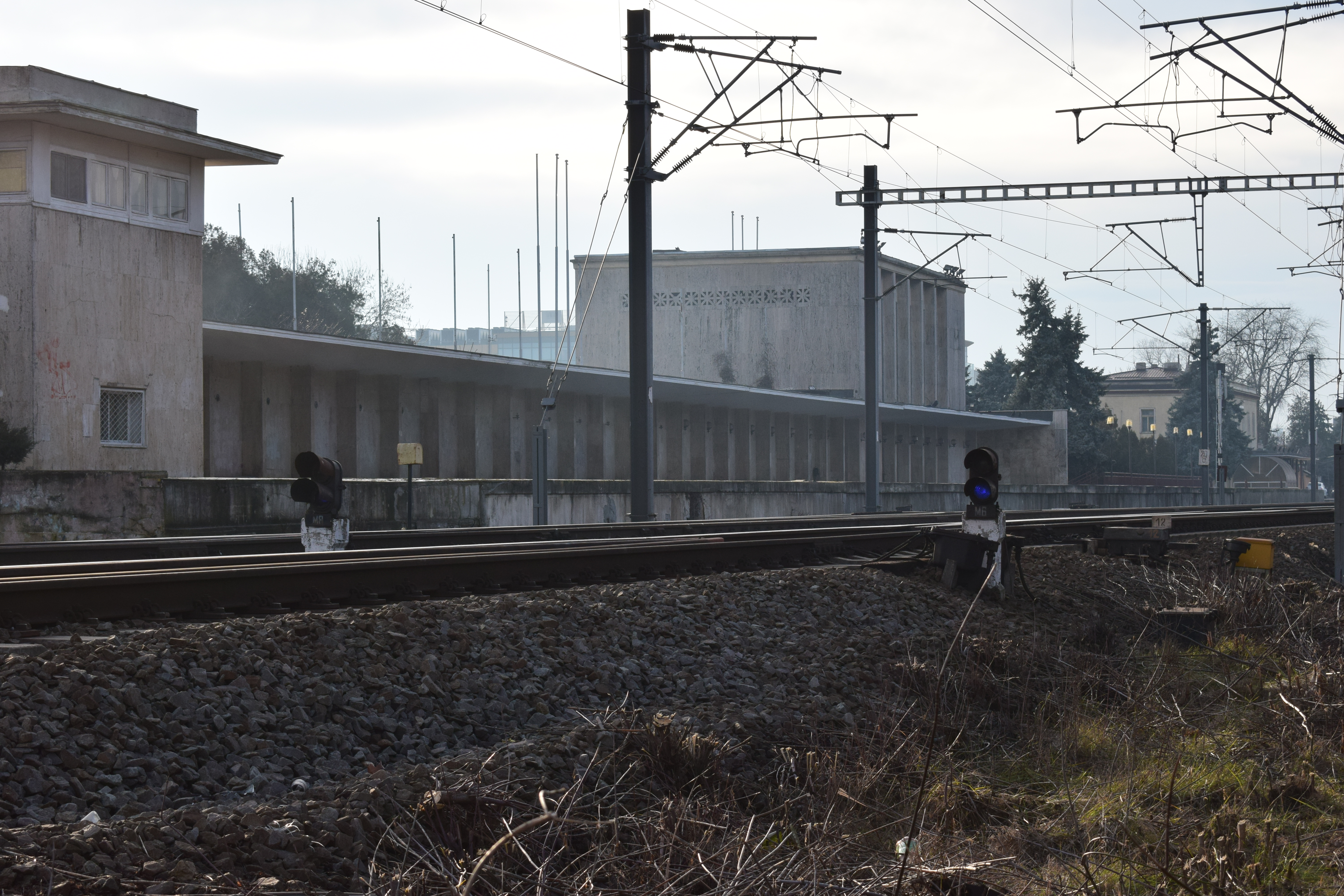
Băneasa Railway Station as seen from the platforms' side

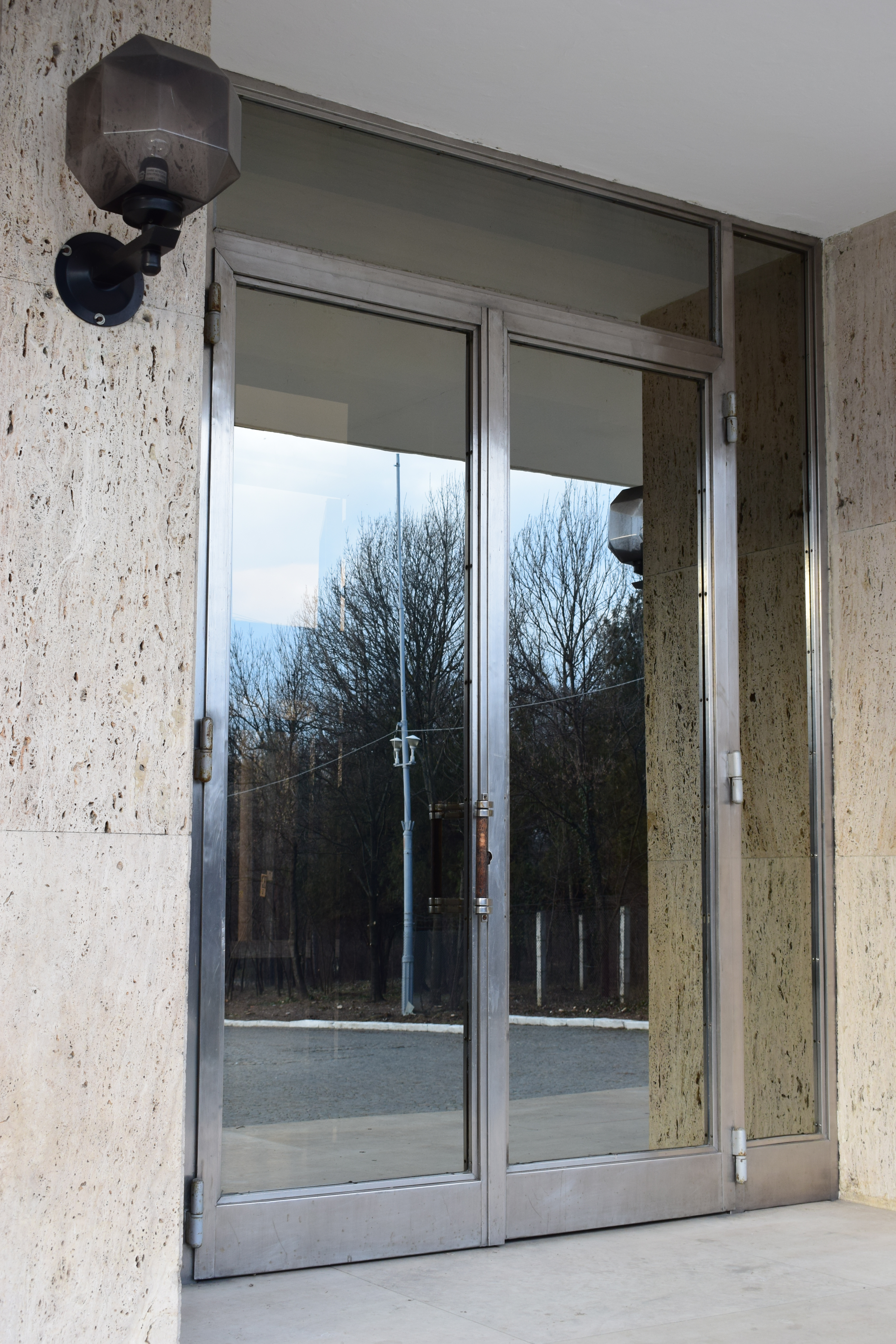
Architecture detail: an entrance door

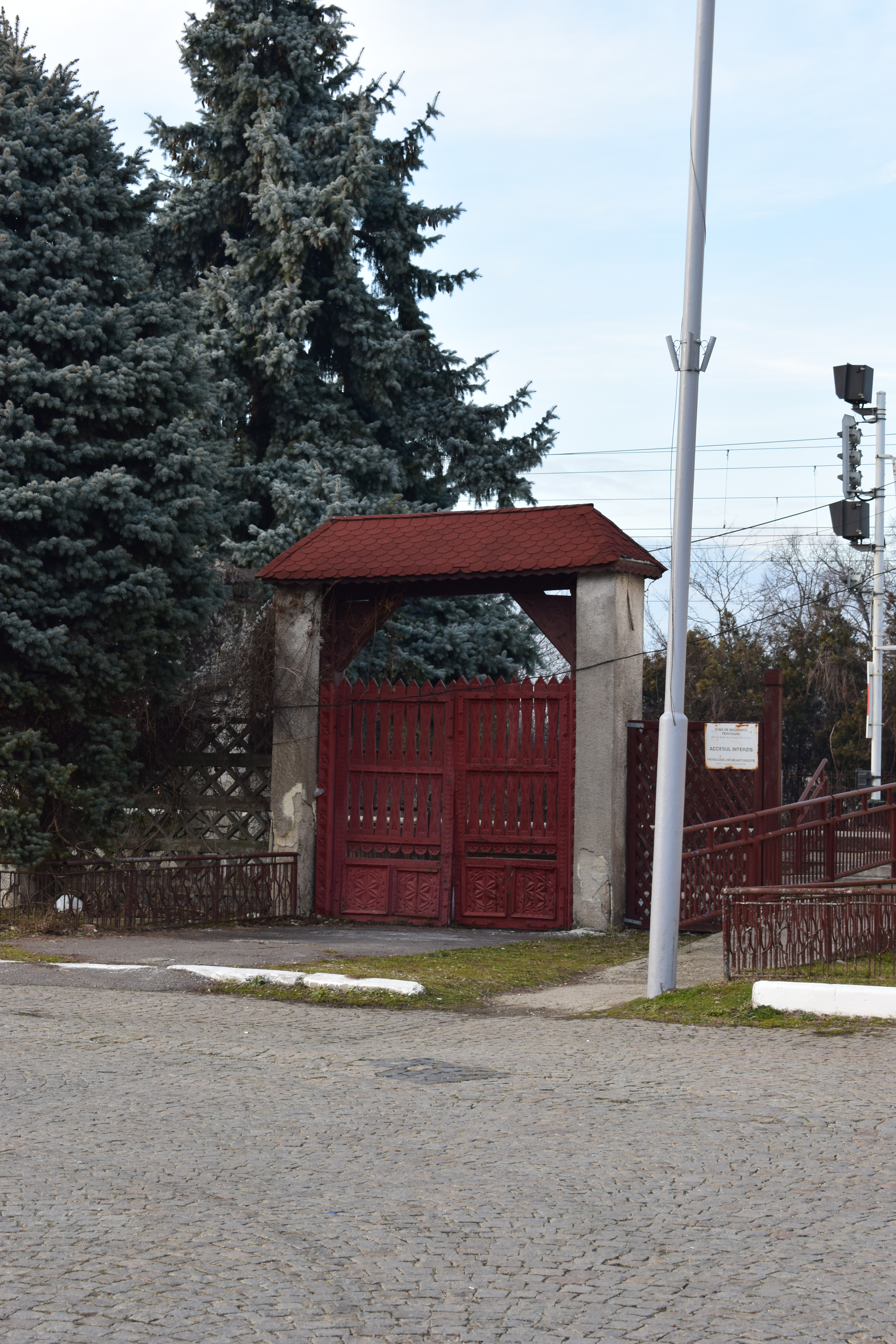
The entrance gate to the platform of Băneasa Royal Railway Station, built in traditional Romanian style

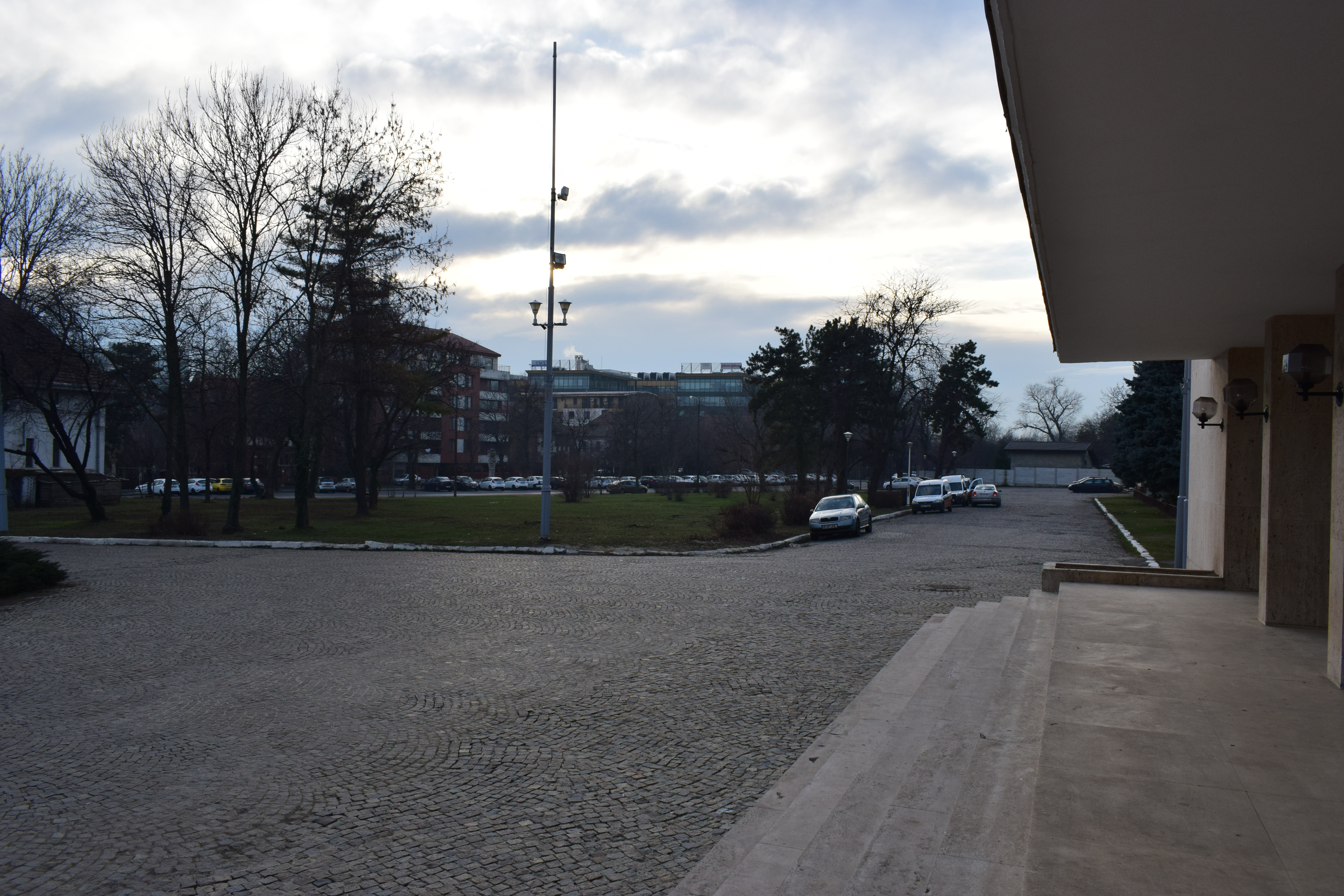
A general view of the place in front of Băneasa Royal Railway Station

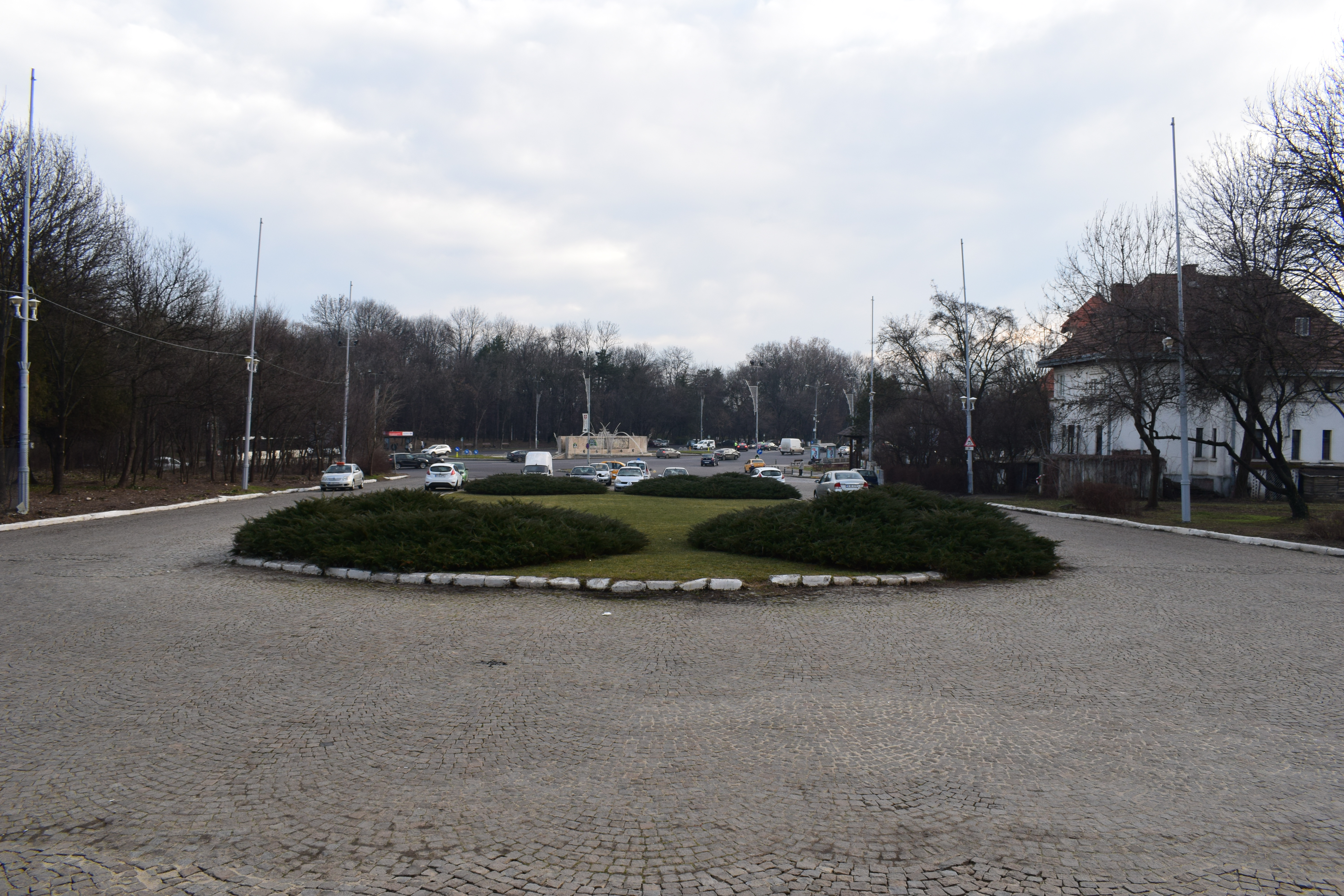
A general view of the place in front of Băneasa Railway Station. You mau see Miorița Fountain (remote) and the Minovici Villa (at right, back building)

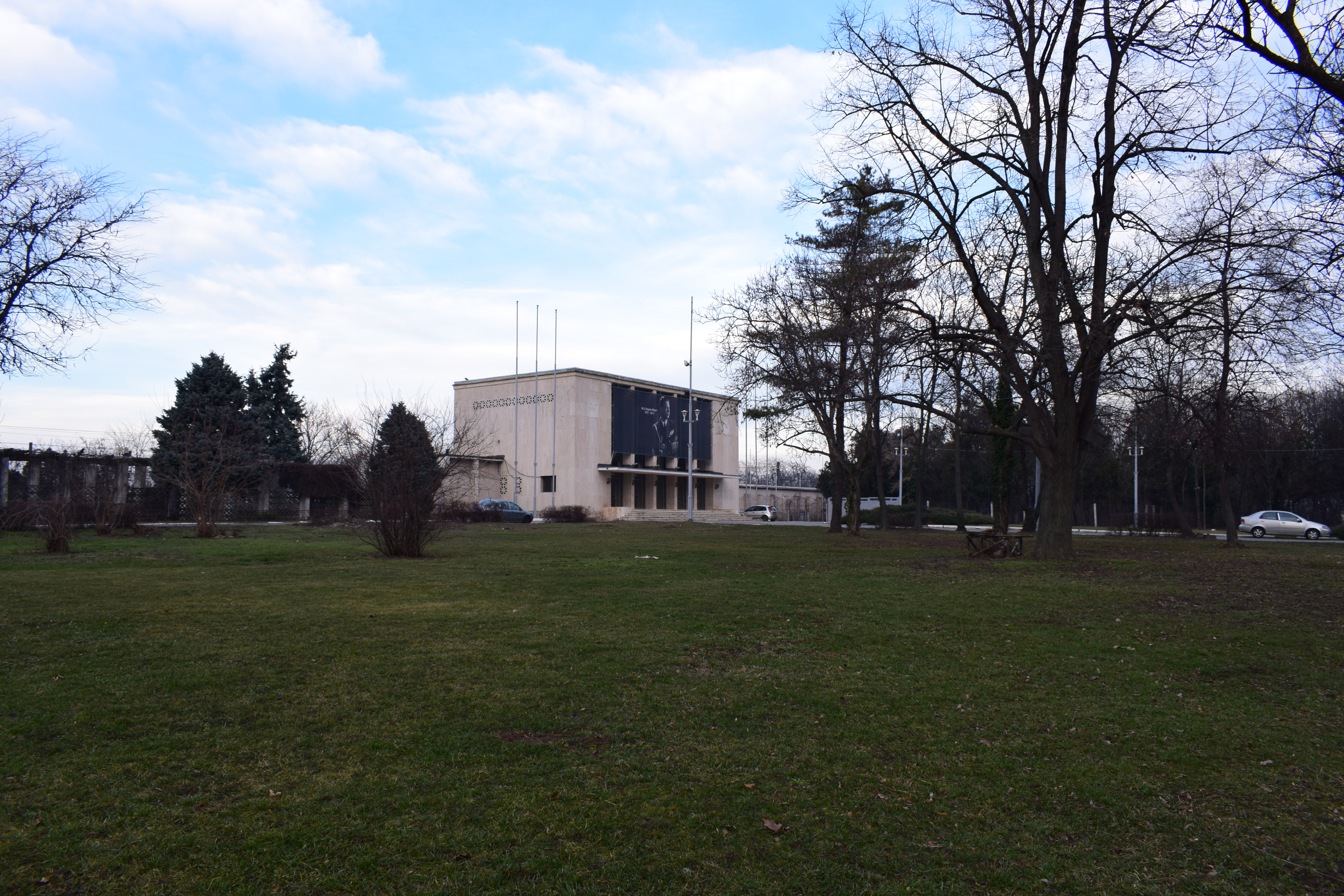
A lateral view of Băneasa Royal Railway Station, with the rose-decorated pergola

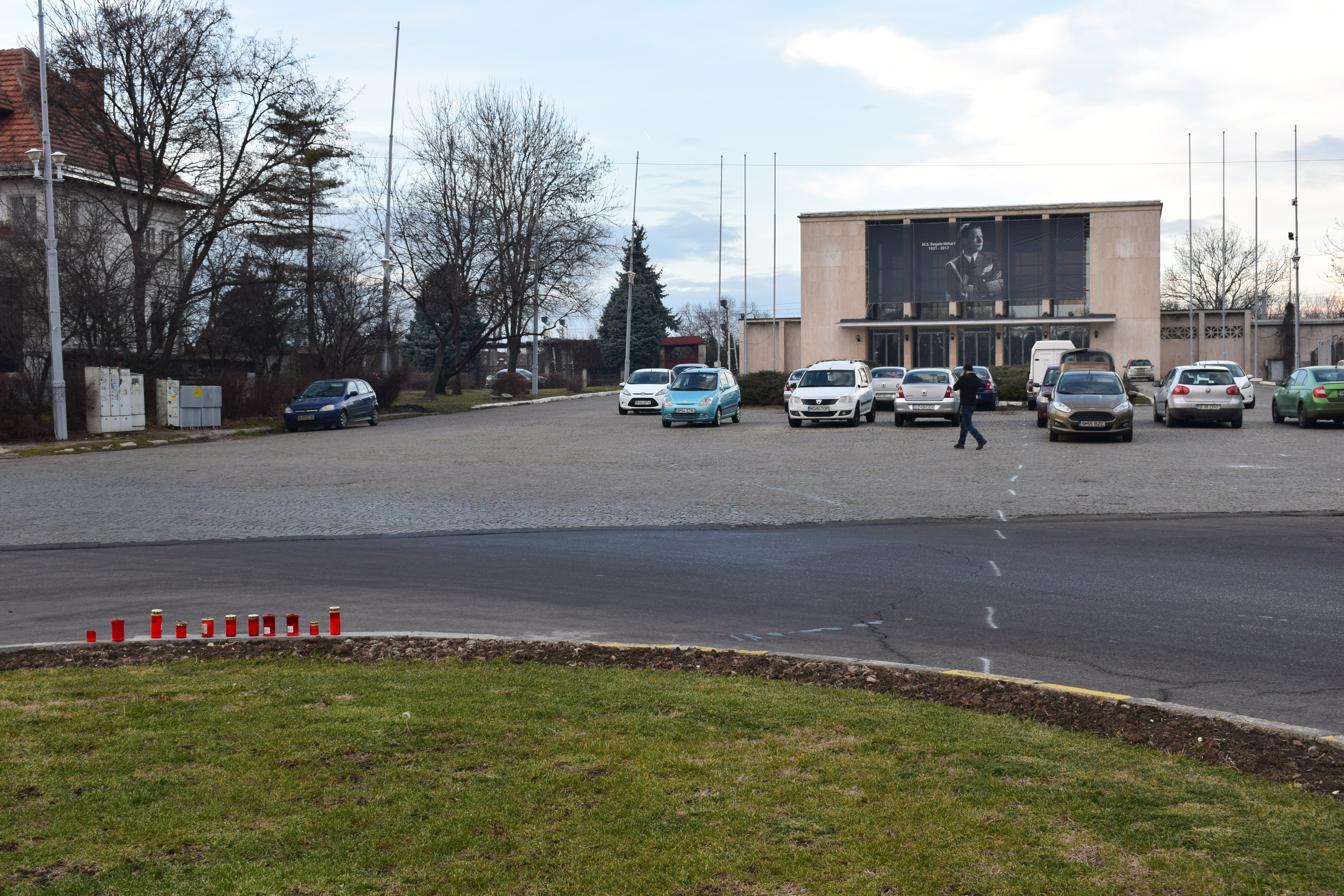
Two weeks after King Michael's coffin left from here, Romanians are still depositing candles on the sidewalk in front of the station
