= X Factor (Romanian TV series) season 9 =

X Factor
- Season 9
- Judges: Ștefan Bănică, Jr. Loredana Groza; Delia Matache; Florin Ristei
- Winner: Andrada Precup
- Winning mentor: Ștefan Bănică, Jr.
- Finals venue: Antena 1 Studios, Romexpo, Bucharest, Romania

Release
- Original network: Antena 1
- Original release: September 11 – December 18, 2020

Season chronology
- ← Previous; Season 8

The ninth season of the X Factor Romania talent show premiered September 11, 2020. Delia Matache and Ștefan Bănică Jr. kept their roles as judges while Loredana Groza and X Factor (Romanian season 3) winner, Florin Ristei, were the two new judges of the talent show. Răzvan Simion and Dani Oțil, the presenters of the morning show Neatza cu Răzvan și Dani returned as the show's hosts after an absence of one season. Crina Mardare was the only vocal coach of the season.

The aspiring artists were able to register online on the site of the show. From these, the producer selected the artists who are to enter the audition stage. This season had the motto #deneoprit (transl. #unstoppable) due to the fact that the whole show is filmed during the COVID-19 pandemic.

== Categories ==
Colour key:

- Winner
- Runner-up
- Eliminated in the Semifinal
- Eliminated in the Duels
- Eliminated in the Bootcamp
- Wildcard

Category (mentor)	Top 40 artists					Wildcard
Girls (Ștefan)						
Girls (Ștefan)	Andrada Precup	Alexandra Sîrghi	Ioana Ardelean	Andra Barangă	Melania Cuc	
Girls (Ștefan)	Andreea Dobre	Ana Paula Rada Pantea	Oana Velea	Marta Verrecchia	Marina Vlad	
Boys (Loredana)						
Boys (Loredana)	Adrian Petrache	Iulian Selea	Eden Loren	Theodor Andrei	Robert Botezan	
Boys (Loredana)	Denis Costea	Arthur Horeanu	Kashy (Gabi Gruici)	Liviu Panait	David Adrian Ștefan	
Over 24s (Delia)						
Over 24s (Delia)	Sonia Mosca	Alina Dincă	Kalon Rae	Iulian Canaf	Mehmet Dural	
Over 24s (Delia)	Otilia Gogu	Naomi Hedman	Austin Hirth	Lakeetra Knowles	Mihai Meiroș	
Groups (Ristei)						
Groups (Ristei)	Super 4	Tiny Tigers	Diana & Ioana Conta	4SURE	Hello (Teodora & Marian)	
Groups (Ristei)	Indrus (Oana & George Indru)	It's US!	RB Queens	Trio Eva	West Vlads	Alfa Band

== Auditions ==
Auditions took place in Bucharest only, because of the COVID-19 pandemic. Filming started on July 7, 2020.

According to the X Factor Romania - the ninth season regulations, each judges was assigned a category to mentor.

- Boys between the ages of 14 and 24 - Loredana Groza
- Girls between the ages of 14 and 24 - Ștefan Bănică Jr.
- Artists over the age of 24 (mixed) - Delia Matache
- Groups - Florin Ristei

Each judge had the right to one vote for each contestant with: "YES" or "NO". Those who received 4 YES-es were advanced directly to the next stage. Those with 3 YES-es were put on the short list of the judge that mentored their category. The judge that mentored the groups category had the opportunity to form groups after the auditions; he could ask for each artist that received 3 YES-es. The judge that mentored the category of the respective artists decided if he will keep them in his category or if he will leave them for the group category.

Each judge completed his team with 10 artists/musical acts.

=== Episode 1 (September 11) ===
✔ Judge voted YES; ✘ Judge voted NO; Artist received 4 YES-es, therefore they went straight into the next stage; Artist received just 1 or 2 YES-es, therefore they were eliminated; The mentor of the artist's category

Order	Artist	Age	Hometown	Category	Song(s)	Verdict			
Order	Artist	Age	Hometown	Category	Song(s)	Ristei	Delia	Loredana	Ștefan
1	Ioana Ardelean	20	Bucharest	Girls	"Still In Love"	✔	✔	✔	✔
2	Vlad Moigrădeanu	30	Timișoara	Over 24s	"Blue Suede Shoes"	✘	—	✘	✔
3	Vlad Erdei	30	Timișoara	Over 24s	"Something About the Way You Look Tonight"	✘	—	—	—
4	Vlad Erdei & Vlad Moigrădeanu	30	Timișoara	Groups	"Don't Let the Sun Go Down on Me"	✘	✔	✔	✔
5	Radu Brescan	24	Bucharest	Over 24s	"Feeling Good" "Foaie verde, foi de floare"	✘	✘	—	✔ (after hearing the 2nd song)
6	Lavinia Jitaru	16	Craiova	Girls	"Mercy on Me"	✔	✔	✔	✘
7	François Larocque	34	Paris, France	Over 24s	Contestant decided to leave the competition				
8	Romanița Duminică	33	Bucharest	Over 24s	"Niciodată nu e prea târziu" (own song)	✘	✘	✔	—
9	Buffon01 (Florin Doleanu)	23	Bucharest	Boys	"Călător prin Europa" (own song)	✔	✘	✔	✔
10	Bianca Ionescu	17	Bucharest	Girls	"Hello" "You Don't Do It for Me Anymore"	✔	✔	✔	✘
11	Marius Amariei	34	Sibiu	Over 24s	"Arată-i c-o iu..."	✘	✘	✔	✔
12	Alexandra Țiuleanu	23	Craiova	Girls	"I Have Nothing"	✘	—	—	✘
13	Adrian Petrache	19	Bucharest	Boys	"Hard Times (No One Knows Better Than I)"	✔	✔	✔	✔
14	Giulian Ioan	34	Bucharest	Over 24s	"Sway"	✘	✔	✔	✔
15	Jeni Ion	33	Bucharest	Over 24s	"Cuvinte"	Impossible to advance due to contestant's deafness			

=== Episode 2 (September 18) ===
Order	Artist	Age	Hometown	Category	Song(s)	Verdict			
Order	Artist	Age	Hometown	Category	Song(s)	Ristei	Delia	Loredana	Ștefan
1	Iulia Perpelea	17	Bucharest	Girls	"He Taught Me How to Yodel"	✔	✔	✔	✘
2	Alex Mica	29	Timiș	Over 24s	"Pe-o margine de lume"	✔	✘	✔	✔
3	Izabela Maria Marin	20	Râmnicu Vâlcea	Girls	"It's a Man's Man's Man's World" "Something's Got a Hold on Me" "Hit the Road Jack" alongside Florin Ristei	✘	—	—	✘
4	Andrada Precup	16	Bucharest	Girls	"Proud Mary"	✔	✔	✔	✔
5	Alexandra Moraru	18	Timișoara	Girls	"Raggamuffin" "Ce-ți cântă dragostea"	✘	✘	✘	✘
6	Lucian Pință	57	Breaza	Over 24s	"Smile"	✔	✘	✔	✔
7	Andra Ariadna Chitu	25	Bucharest	Over 24s	"Revolution" "Yesterday"	✔	✔	✔	✘
8	Cornel Munteanu	17	Bucharest	Boys	"Umbrella"	✘	✘	✘	✘
9	Denis Iane	29	Bucharest	Over 24s	"I Like It"	✔	✘	✔	✔
10	Super 4 (Aurelio Fierro Jr., Gregorio Rega, Salvatore "Sabba" Lampitelli and Francesco Boccia)	4 members	Naples, Italy	Groups	"Un'emozione da poco" "Caruso"	✔	✔	✔	✔
11	Angelo Iancu	19	Lugoj	Boys	"I Put a Spell on You"	✘	✔	✔	✔
12	Carmen Belenesi	46	Cluj-Napoca	Over 24s	"Pasiune maximă" (own song)	✔	✘	✘	✔

=== Episode 3 (September 25) ===
Order	Artist	Age	Hometown	Category	Song(s)	Verdict			
Order	Artist	Age	Hometown	Category	Song(s)	Ristei	Delia	Loredana	Ștefan
1	Mistah White (Radu Deac)	32	Bucharest	Over 24s	"Magie" (own song)	✔	✘	✔	✔
2	Alfa Band (Andrei, Florin, Mira & Bianca)	4 members	Cluj-Napoca	Groups	"The Sounds of Silence"	No vote Sent directly to Bootcamp as WILDCARD			
3	Theodor Andrei	15	Bucharest	Boys	"If I Can Dream"	✔	✔	✔	✔
4	Oana Velea	16	Bucharest	Girls	"Praying"	✔	✔	✔	✔
5	Tomer "Tomy" Jack Weissbuch	22	Bucharest	Boys	own song	✘	✘	—	✘
6	Otilia Gogu & ~~Adelina Gogu~~	46 & ~~20~~	Mărășești	~~Groups~~, Over 24s	"Două inimi"	✔	✔	✔	✔
7	Rawi Srouji	23	Nazareth, Israel	Boys	"Tamally Maak"	✔	✘	✔	✔
8	Bianca Sandu	22	Timișoara	Girls	"Rather Be"	✘	—	✘	—
9	Lucian Păscan	40	Miercurea-Ciuc	Over 24s	"N'oubliez jamais"	✘	✔	✔	✔
10	Ana Cernicova	29	Chișinău, Moldova	Over 24s	"I Don't Wanna Be a Soldier Mama" "Ave Maria"	✔ (after hearing the 2nd song)	✘	✔ (after hearing the 2nd song)	✔ (after hearing the 2nd song)
11	Eduard Crenganiș	25	Iași	Over 24s	"De-aș avea" (own song)	✘	✘	—	✘
12	Naomi Hedman	27	London, United Kingdom	Over 24s	"Fallin'" "If I Ain't Got You" alongside Florin Ristei	✔ (after hearing the duet)	✔ (after hearing the duet)	✔ (after hearing the duet)	✔ (after hearing the duet)

=== Episode 4 (October 2) ===
Order	Artist	Age	Hometown	Category	Song(s)	Verdict			
Order	Artist	Age	Hometown	Category	Song(s)	Ristei	Delia	Loredana	Ștefan
1	Alina Dincă	30	Bucharest	Over 24s	"Love On The Brain"	✔	✔	✔	✔
2	Andi Horjea	24	Bucharest	Over 24s	"Breathe Easy"	✔	✘	✔	✔
3	Alexia Andreea Lupea	17	Galați	Girls	"Kill This Love"	—	✘	—	✘
4	Ana Maria German	29	Târgu Mureș	Over 24s	"Casa mea"	—	—	—	—
5	Bianca Mihai	19	Buzău	Girls	"Something In The Way"	✔	✔	✔	✘
6	Mihai Spînu	25	Slatina	Over 24s	"Copacul"	✔	✔	—	✘
7	Robert Botezan	24	Sibiu	Boys	"Lucifer" (own song)	✔	✔	✔	✔
8	Apollo & Artemis Evanghelos	19 & 19	Ploiești	Groups	"Rămâi" / "Thelo Konta Sou Na Meino"	✘	✔	✔	✔
9	Andrei Dafin	33	Suceava	Over 24s	"Interzis de dulce" (own song)	✘	—	✘	—
10	Vasi Bistrae	31	Constanța	Over 24s	"At Last"	✘	✔	✔	✔
11	Vasi Tiberiu Botezătoru	26	Constanța	Over 24s	"Andrei Radu"	—	✘	✘	✘
12	Dominique Simionescu	18	Sibiu	Girls	"Inimă nu fi de piatră" / "I Will Survive"	✔	✔	✔	✘
13	Ana Paula Rada Pantea	19	Portugal	Girls	"Granada"	✔	✔	✔	✔

=== Episode 5 (October 9) ===
Order	Artist	Age	Hometown	Category	Song(s)	Verdict			
Order	Artist	Age	Hometown	Category	Song(s)	Ristei	Delia	Loredana	Ștefan
1	Bogdan Mureșan	23	Arad	Boys	"Mortal" (own song)	✔	✔	✘	✔
2	Alisia Ienei	18	Oradea	Girls	"It's a Man's Man's Man's World"	✘	✘	✔	✘
3	Mario Rosini	56	Gioia del Colle, Italy	Over 24s	"L'infinità"	✘	✔	✔	✔
4	Dragoș Marian Calotă	31	Timișoara	Over 24s	"Writing's on the Wall"	✘	✘	✘	✘
5	Chriss Casper	32	Bucharest	Over 24s	"Little Paris"	✔	✘	✔	✔
6	Sava Răgățeanu	60	Bucharest	Over 24s	"Sărut, femeie, mâna ta"	✘	✔	✔	✘
7	Melania Cuc	19	Ghioroc	Girls	"Never Enough"	✔	✔	✔	✔
8	Maria Andraș	18	Sfântu Gheorghe	Girls	"Talking to the Moon"	✔	✔	✔	✘
9	Florentina Stan	42	Bucharest	Over 24s	"November Rain" "Zombie"	—	—	—	—
10	Arthur Horeanu	15	Arad	Boys	"I Don't Want to Be"	✔	✔	✔	✔
11	Sorin Ene	39	Gratia	Over 24s	"Fir-ai tu să fii de murg"	—	—	—	—
12	Sonia Mosca	28	Salerno, Italy	Over 24s	"And I Am Telling You I'm Not Going" "Burn Baby Burn"	✔	✔	✔	✔

=== Episode 6 (October 16) ===
Order	Artist	Age	Hometown	Category	Song(s)	Verdict			
Order	Artist	Age	Hometown	Category	Song(s)	Ristei	Delia	Loredana	Ștefan
1	Denis Costea	14	Brașov	Boys	"Cruisin' for a Bruisin'"	✔	✔	✔	✔
2	Rareș Nicolae Iorga	20	Argeș	Boys	"The Real Slim Shady"	✘	✘	✘	✘
3	Marina Vlad	22	Craiova	Girls	"Fallin'"	✔	✘	✔	✔
4	Liviu Panait	23	Agigea	Boys	"Stay"	✔	✔	✔	✘
5	Anna Turrei	24	Milan, Italy	Over 24s	"Black Widow"	✔	✘	✔	✔
6	Marius Lemeni	26	Oradea	Over 24s	"Iubește-o sincer"	✘	✔	—	✘
7	Tania Morales	41	Bucharest	Over 24s	"Hasta la Muerte" (own song) "De-ar fi să vii"	✘	✔	✔	✔
8	Andreea Fabri	16	Nădlac	Girls	"She Taught Me to Yodel"	✔	✔	✔	✘
9	Jurgen Bonaccini	41	Bucharest	Over 24s	"Perdere l'amore"	✘	✘	—	✘
10	Ana Maria Ioana	20	Sibiu	Girls	"I'll Take Care of You"	✘	✔	✔	✔
11	Alexandra Sîrghi	18	Galați	Girls	"I Don't Think About You"	✔	✔	✔	✔
12	Marcelo Souza	35	Bucharest	Over 24s	"??"	—	✘	✔	✘
13	Cristina Teodorescu	37	Bucharest	Over 24s	"My Heart Will Go On"	✔	—	✔	✔

=== Episode 7 (October 23) ===
Order	Artist	Age	Hometown	Category	Song(s)	Verdict			
Order	Artist	Age	Hometown	Category	Song(s)	Ristei	Delia	Loredana	Ștefan
1	Ioana Ilincescu	17	Bucharest	Girls	"Into The Unknown"	✔	✔	✔	✘
2	Harmony Duo	46 & 56	Constanța	Groups	"Stumblin' In" "Don't Go Breaking My Heart" (with Florin Ristei)	✔ (after hearing the 2nd song)	✔ (after hearing the 2nd song)	✔ (after hearing the 2nd song)	✘
3	Stelian Savu	30	Bucharest	Over 24s	"Compilation"	✘	✔	✘	✘
4	Maia Mălăncuș	14	Iași	Girls	"Just Like Fire"	✔	✔	✔	✘
5	Monica Puiu	36	Bucharest	Over 24s	"You Are the Reason"	✘	—	✘	✘
6	Iulian Canaf	47	Iași	Over 24s	"Please Accept My Love"	✔	✔	✔	✔
7	Ferenc Zsolt Gál	30	Târgu Mureș	Over 24s	"Best Days" (own song)	✘	—	✘	✘
8	Kashy (Ștefan Gabriel Luca)	19	Moldova Nouă	Boys	"Child in Time" (own song) "Child in Time"	✘	✔	✔	✔
9	Cristina Dăscălescu	48	Bacău	Over 24s	"Lágrima"	✘	✔	✔	✔
10	Maria Viorela Lupu	19	Bucharest	Girls	"Pe când te iubeam"	✘	✘	✘	—
11	Kalon Rae	33	London, United Kingdom	Over 24s	"Lately"	✔	✔	✔	✔

=== Episode 8 (October 30) ===
Order	Artist	Age	Hometown	Category	Song(s)	Verdict			
Order	Artist	Age	Hometown	Category	Song(s)	Ristei	Delia	Loredana	Ștefan
1	Carla Ioniță	14	Cluj-Napoca	Girls	"idontwannabeyouanymore"	✔	✔	✔	✘
2	David Adrian Ștefan	14	Bucharest	Boys	"Who's Lovin' You"	✔	✔	✔	✔
3	Maria Alexandra Voiculescu	30	Sibiu	Over 24s	"You and I"	✘	—	✘	✘
4	Simona Smultea	32	Timișoara	Over 24s	"Bang Bang (My Baby Shot Me Down)"	—	—	—	—
5	Diana & Denisa Simion	23 & 23	Focșani	Groups	"Dance Monkey"	✘	✘	✔	—
6	Vanessa Ion	17	Bucharest	Girls	"Fallin'"	✔	✔	✔	✘
7	Costi Pucă	19	Arad	Boys	"Puștoaico" (own song)	—	—	✘	✘
8	Andrada Ghiduruș	15	Slobozia	Girls	"I Dreamed A Dream"	✘	✔	✔	✔
9	Alexandru Stamate	28	Târgu Jiu	Over 24s	"Superstition"	✘	—	✘	✘
10	Ioan Păduraru	32	Bacău	Over 24s	"I Believe I Can Fly"	✔	✔	✘	✔
11	Cristina Gheorghe	28	Bucharest	Over 24s	"We Don't Have to Take Our Clothes Off"	✔	✘	✔	✔
12	Mihăiță Liviu Stan	31	Brăila	Over 24s	"Sus paharul"	✘	✘	✘	✘
13	Lakeetra Knowles	42	Pavia, Italy / Little Rock, Arkansas, United States	Over 24s	"It's a Man's Man's Man's World"	✔	✔	✔	✔

=== Episode 9 (November 6) ===
Order	Artist	Age	Hometown	Category	Song(s)	Verdict			
Order	Artist	Age	Hometown	Category	Song(s)	Ristei	Delia	Loredana	Ștefan
1	Sara Memba	30	Spain	Over 24s	"Mundo Bicolor"	✘	✘	✔	✔
2	Ana Maria Roșu	24	Bucharest	Over 24s	"Ain't No Way"	✔	✘	✔	✔
3	Zila Mike (Mihai Negru)	26	Bucharest	Over 24s	"King Zila" (own song)	✘	✔	✔	✔
4	Austin Hirth	28	Cluj-Napoca / Florida, United States	Over 24s	"Budapest"	✔	✔	✔	✔
5	Jasmina Glodeanu	31	Bucharest	Over 24s	"Chuva"	✔	✔	✔	✘
6	INDEPENDENȚII (Ștefan Bolnavu & Cătălin Heisanu)	23 & 23	Curtea de Argeș	Groups	own song	✘	✔	✔	✔
7	Beatrice Giurgiu	38	Timișoara	Over 24s	"Mercy on Me"	✘	✔	✔	✔
8	Parascheva Burdjua	23	Iași	Girls	"If I Die Young"	—	✘	✘	✘
9	Katarina Dyer	21	Bucharest	Girls	"Love on the Brain"	✔	✔	✔	✘
10	Cezara Daiana Niculcia	22	Timișoara	Girls	"Te iubeam"	—	✘	—	✘
11	Cătălin Valea	47	Petroșani	Over 24s	"Say Something"	—	—	✘	✘
12	Mihai Meiroș	34	Bucharest	Over 24s	"Lady"	✘	✔	✔	✔
13	Marta Verrecchia	18	Gaeta, Italy	Girls	"Listen"	✔	✔	✔	✔

=== Episode 10 (November 12) ===
Order	Artist	Age	Hometown	Category	Song(s)	Verdict			
Order	Artist	Age	Hometown	Category	Song(s)	Ristei	Delia	Loredana	Ștefan
1	Andreea Dobre	18	Straja	Girls	"Murderer"	✔	✔	✔	✔
2	Tiberiu Gache	33	Bucharest	Over 24s	"DROP" (own song)	✘	✘	✘	✘
3	Alexandra Căpitănescu	17	Galați	Girls	"Am I The One"	✔	✔	✘	✔
4	Marian Vasilescu	28	Bucharest	Over 24s	"Imagine"	✘	✔	✔	✔
5	Oana & George Indru	28 & 21	Timișoara	Groups	"Give In to Me"	✔	✔	✔	✔
6	Nadia Shehabi	26	Timișoara	Over 24s	"Elastic Heart"	✘	✘	✘	✘
7	Mihaela Condurache	51	Bucharest	Over 24s	"She's Gone Out of My Life"	✔	✘	✔	✔
8	Ioana Cristodorescu	21	Bucharest	Girls	"Drinking In The Day"	✘	✔	✔	✔
9	Roxana Ghiuzan	16	Roman	Girls	"I Put a Spell on You"	✘	✘	✘	✘
10	Mattia Perdeti	31	Italy	Over 24s	"Don't Stop 'Til You Get Enough"	✔	✔	✔	✘

=== Episode 11 (November 13) ===
Order	Artist	Age	Hometown	Category	Song(s)	Verdict			
Order	Artist	Age	Hometown	Category	Song(s)	Ristei	Delia	Loredana	Ștefan
1	Ilinca Dinu	15	Bucharest	Girls	"Am I The One"	✘	✔	✔	✔
2	Zoran Demian	21	Timișoara	Boys	"Human"	✘	✔	✔	✔
3	Corina Badea	51	Tulcea	Over 24s	"Ce are ea"	✘	✔	✔	✘
4	Iulian Selea	21	Pitești	Boys	"You Are the Reason"	✔	✔	✔	✔
5	Alexandra Marin Raicu	30	Brăila	Over 24s	"Rămâi și nu pleca"	✘	—	✘	✔
6	Ioan Gasparovici	18	Brașov	Boys	"Yesterday"	✔	✔	✘	✔
7	Rania Kutkut	17	Suceava	Girls	"Empire State of Mind"	✘	✘	✘	✔
8	Cristina Vasiu	28	Bucharest	Over 24s	"Oameni"	✔	✘	✔	✔
9	Răzvan Drăgan	22	Bucharest	Boys	"Say You Won't Let Go"	—	—	✔	✘
10	Diana & Ioana Conta	22 & 22	Timișoara	Groups	"lovely"	✔	✔	✔	✔
11	Zorana Samson	17	Bucharest	Girls	"Toxic"	✔	✔	✔	✘
12	Mehmet Dural	33	Bucharest	Over 24s	"Cennet" "Drumurile noastre"	✔	✔	✔	✔

=== Episode 12 (November 19) ===
Order	Artist	Age	Hometown	Category	Song(s)	Verdict			
Order	Artist	Age	Hometown	Category	Song(s)	Ristei	Delia	Loredana	Ștefan
1	Daria Pintilie	15	Piatra Neamț	Girls	"Survivor"	✔	✔	✔	✘
2	Mădălina Așchipoaie	24	Iași	Over 24s	"Million Years Ago"	✘	✘	✘	✘
3	Anne Laura Noupadja	28	Bucharest	Over 24s	"Rumour Mill"	✔	✘	✔	✔
4	Teodora & Marian	27 & 28	Bucharest	Groups	"Billie Jean"	✔	✔	✔	✔
5	Karina Ștefan	15	Giroc	Girls	"If I Ain't Got You"	✘	✔	✔	✔
6	Lavinia & Alexandru	32 & 34	Timișoara	Groups	"Yes Rasta" (own song)	✘	✘	✘	—
7	Carmen Macovei	46	Petroșani	Over 24s	"If I Could Turn Back Time"	—	✘	✘	✘
8	Miruna Puiu	24	Sighetu Marmației	Over 24s	"Diamonds"	✘	✔	✘	✔
9	Virgil Bob	51	Sălaj	Over 24s	"Nu mai beau" (own song)	✘	✔	✔	✔
10	Andra Barangă	17	Năvodari	Girls	"Run To You"	✔	✔	✔	✔
11	Silvia Mitrache	61	Craiova / Parma, Italy	Over 24s	"The Best"	✘	✔	✔	✔

=== Episode 13 (November 20) ===
Order	Artist	Age	Hometown	Category	Song(s)	Verdict			
Order	Artist	Age	Hometown	Category	Song(s)	Ristei	Delia	Loredana	Ștefan
1	Roxana Ene	27	Măcin / Rome, Italy	Over 24s	"Cine iubește și lasă"	✔	✘	✔	✔
2	Alina Bumbeș	26	Bucharest	Over 24s	"Fallin'"	✘	—	✘	✘
3	Denisa Avram	16	Buzău	Girls	"Seven Nation Army"	✔	✔	✘	✔
4	Trio Eva (Alexandra, Evelina, Valeria)	14 & 15 & 16	Chișinău, Moldova	Groups	"Chandelier"	✔	✔	✔	✔
5	Gabriel Cîndea	27	Hunedoara	Over 24s	"Broken Vow"	✔	✘	✔	✔
6	Alexandrina Robea	27	Bucharest	Over 24s	"Mulțumesc, iubită mamă!"	✔	✘	✔	✔
7	Enrico Bernardo	46	Naples, Italy	Over 24s	"When a Man Loves a Woman" "Caruso"	✔	✘	✔	✔
8	Andrada Făină	16	Gorj	Girls	"Break My Broken Heart"	✔	✘	✔	✔
9	Anton Daroți	18	Bucharest	Boys	"Las-o să zboare"	—	✘	✘	✘
10	Alexandrina Grosu	29	Chișinău, Moldova / Bilbao, Spain	Over 24s	"Fuego"	✘	✘	✔	✔
11	Claudia Iuga & Raul Jipa	41 & 35	Arad & Bucharest	Groups	"Shallow"	✔	✔	✔	✘
12	Liviu Giulian Miluț	14	Calafat	Boys	"??" (own song)	✘	✔	✔	✔
13	Andreea Niță	20	Timișoara	Girls	"De-ai fi tu salcie la mal"	✘	—	✘	✘
14	Eden Loren	19	Rome, Italy	Boys	"Il Mare Calmo Della Sera"	✔	✔	✔	✔

=== Systematized auditions summary ===
==== Boys ====
Advanced automatically with 4 YES-es

- Theodor Andrei
- Robert Botezan
- Denis Costea
- Arthur Horeanu
- Eden Loren
- Adrian Petrache
- Iulian Selea
- David Adrian Ștefan

Advanced through the short list with 3 YES-es

- Kashy (Gabi Gruici)
- Liviu Panait

==== Girls ====
Advanced automatically with 4 YES-es

- Ioana Ardelean
- Andra Barangă
- Melania Cuc
- Andreea Dobre
- Ana Paula Rada Pantea
- Andrada Precup
- Alexandra Sîrghi
- Oana Velea
- Marta Verrecchia

Advanced through the short list with 3 YES-es

- Marina Vlad

==== Groups ====
Advanced automatically with 4 YES-es

- Diana & Ioana Conta
- Oana & George Indru
- Super 4
- Hello (Teodora & Marian)
- Trio Eva

Advanced through the short list with 3 YES-es

- West Vlads (Vlad Erdei & Vlad Moigrădeanu)

Formed by Ristei consisting of 3 YES-es contestants rejected by the mentor of their original category

- 4SURE (Vasi Bistrae, Zoran Demian, Marian Vasilesc & Mistah White)
- It's US! (Chriss Casper & Daria Pintilie)
- RB Queens (Cristina Gheorghe, Anne Laura Noupadja, Cristina Vasiu)
- Tiny Tigers (Alexandra Căpitănescu, Bianca Ionescu, Carla Ioniță, Karina Ștefan)

==== Over 24s ====
Advanced automatically with 4 YES-es

- Iulian Canaf
- Alina Dincă
- Mehmet Dural
- Otilia Gogu
- Naomi Hedman
- Austin Hirth
- Lakeetra Knowles
- Sonia Mosca
- Kalon Rae

Advanced through the short list with 3 YES-es

- Mihai Meiroș

== Bootcamp ==
Each judge completed its team with 10 artists. In case the judges did not have enough contestants in their teams who passed automatically with 4 YES-es, they had to choose from those with 3 YES-es from their short list.

In the bootcamp, each contestant performed a song and only 3 artists per category were advanced.

=== Episode 14 − Boys (November 26) ===
Color key
– Contestant was immediately eliminated after performance without switch
– Contestant was switched out later in the competition and eventually eliminated
– Contestant was not switched out and made the final three of their own category

Order	Act	Song	Mentor's decision	Switched with
1	Theodor Andrei	"That's How You Write a Song"	Put in Chair 1	Iulian Selea
2	David Adrian Ștefan	"Like I'm Gonna Lose You"	Put in Chair 2	Adrian Petrache
3	Kashy (Gabi Gruici)	"Stairway to Heaven"	Put in Chair 3	Eden Loren
4	Liviu Panait	"I'll Never Love Again"	Eliminated	
5	Denis Costea	"I'm Still Standing"	Eliminated	
6	Iulian Selea	"Writing's on the Wall"	Put in Chair 1	
7	Arthur Horeanu	"Mama, I'm Coming Home"	Eliminated	
8	Eden Loren	"Who Wants to Live Forever"	Put in Chair 3	
9	Adrian Petrache	"Superstition"	Put in Chair 2	
10	Robert Botezan	"Epilog"	Eliminated	

=== Episode 15 − Girls (November 27) ===
Order	Act	Song	Mentor's decision	Switched with
1	Andreea Dobre	"Cryin'"	Eliminated	
2	Marina Vlad	"Believe"	Put in Chair 1	Ioana Ardelean
3	Oana Velea	"Lost on You"	Put in Chair 2	Andrada Precup
4	Alexandra Sîrghi	"Love On Top"	Put in Chair 3	
5	Ioana Ardelean	"I'm Not the Only One"	Put in Chair 1	
6	Ana Paula Rada Pantea	"Copacul"	Eliminated	
7	Marta Verrecchia	"Bang Bang"	Eliminated	
8	Melania Cuc	"Shallow"	Eliminated	
9	Andra Barangă	"Creep"	Eliminated	
10	Andrada Precup	"Lie, ciocârlie"	Put in Chair 2	

=== Episode 16 − Groups (December 3) ===
Order	Act	Song	Mentor's decision	Switched with
1	It's Us!	"Nobody's Wife"	Put in Chair 1	Super 4
2	4SURE	"Hall of Fame" / "Use Somebody"	Put in Chair 2	Diana & Ioana Conta
3	West Vlads	"Rise & Fall"	Eliminated	
4	Trio Eva	"Single Ladies (Put a Ring on It)"	Put in Chair 3	RB Queens
5	RB Queens	"God is a woman"	Put in Chair 3	Tiny Tigers
EXTRA	Alpha Band	"Hallelujah"	WILDCARD	
6	Indrus	"She Wolf (Falling to Pieces)"	Eliminated	
7	Tiny Tigers	"Wannabe"	Put in Chair 3	
8	Diana & Ioana Conta	"The Blower's Daughter"	Put in Chair 2	
9	Hello	"Sign of the Times"	Eliminated	
10	Super 4	"Hey Jude"	Put in Chair 1	

=== Episode 17 − Over 24s (December 4) ===
Order	Act	Song	Mentor's decision	Switched with
1	Alina Dincă	"Fate"	Put in Chair 1	
2	Kalon Rae	"Ain't Nobody"	Put in Chair 2	
3	Mihai Meiroș	"Ce bine că ești"	Eliminated	
4	Lakeetra Knowles	"(You Make Me Feel Like) A Natural Woman"	Put in Chair 3	Iulian Canaf
5	Naomi Hedman	"Lose Control"	Eliminated	
6	Mehmet Dural	"Losing My Religion"	Eliminated	
7	Iulian Canaf	"Ain't Nobody's Business"	Put in Chair 3	Sonia Mosca
8	Otilia Gogu	"În singurătate"	Eliminated	
9	Austin Hirth	"Iris"	Eliminated	
10	Sonia Mosca	"Run to You"	Put in Chair 3	

== Duels: Episode 18 (December 10) ==
Two acts per category were advanced, while one act per category was eliminated by the mentor of the respective category.

Color key
– The act was eliminated.
– The act was advanced.

Category (mentor)	Order	Act	Song	Mentor's decision
Boys (Loredana)	1	Iulian Selea	"Falling"	Advanced
Boys (Loredana)	2	Adrian Petrache	"Puteri asupra mea"	Advanced
Boys (Loredana)	3	Eden Loren	"My Way"	Eliminated
Girls (Ștefan)	4	Ioana Ardelean	"Runnin' (Lose It All)"	Eliminated
Girls (Ștefan)	5	Alexandra Sîrghi	"Good Woman"	Advanced
Girls (Ștefan)	6	Andrada Precup	"All of Me"	Advanced
Groups (Ristei)	7	Tiny Tigers	"Salute"	Advanced
Groups (Ristei)	8	Diana & Ioana Conta	"Lay Me Down"	Eliminated
Groups (Ristei)	9	Super 4	"Grande Amore"	Advanced
Over 24s (Delia)	10	Alina Dincă	"Omule, deschide ochii"	Advanced
Over 24s (Delia)	11	Kalon Rae	"When You Believe"	Eliminated
Over 24s (Delia)	12	Sonia Mosca	"Think"	Advanced

== Semifinal: Episode 19 (December 11) ==
Only one act per category was advanced, while the other was eliminated by the mentor of the respective category.

Color key
– The act was eliminated.
– The act was advanced.

Category (mentor)	Order	Act	Song	Mentor's decision
Boys (Loredana)	1	Iulian Selea	"Sing"	Eliminated
Boys (Loredana)	2	Adrian Petrache	"Les yeux de la mama"	Advanced
Girls (Ștefan)	3	Alexandra Sîrghi	"Hurt"	Eliminated
Girls (Ștefan)	4	Andrada Precup	"Killing Me Softly with His Song"	Advanced
Groups (Ristei)	5	Super 4	"The Show Must Go On"	Advanced
Groups (Ristei)	6	Tiny Tigers	"Dangerous Woman"	Eliminated
Over 24s (Delia)	7	Sonia Mosca	"Listen"	Advanced
Over 24s (Delia)	8	Alina Dincă	"The Winner Takes It All"	Eliminated

== Goofs, critics and controversies ==
Auditions

- When asked if he had participated in such a show before, Lucian Pință said no. He actually participated in the show Cântă acum cu mine, the Romanian version of All Together Now and Falsez pentru tine, the Romanian version of I Can See Your Voice. (Episode 2)
- Maia Mălăncuș was actually 13 years old when she auditioned, therefore, she had not even reached the minimum age of 14 for the participation in the show. (Episode 7)

Bootcamp

- Both Arthur Horeanu and Kashy (Gabi Gruici) criticized the way their Bootcamp performances were edited. Arthur by adding a comment on the post on Facebook of his performance on the official X Factor Romania page saying: "From the stage I heard differently and I know how I sang. Re-listening to the recording, however, I detected some corrections and compressions that did not benefit me (one is obvious at 1:03), and the shortening of the song somewhat ruined its flow." and Kashy posting an Instagram story from rehearsals saying: "It kind of sounds better here". (Episode 14)

== eXtra Factor ==
The ninth season of the talent show had a companion series titled eXtra Factor. The show's presenter was the actress Ilona Brezoianu, known for the role of secretary Flori from the comedy series Mangalița and the episodes were weekly published on YouTube. The first episode premiered September 11, 2020 on Kaufland Romania's YouTube channel.

#	Featured artists	Runtime	Release date
1	Adrian Petrache; Vlad Erdei & Vlad Moigrădeanu; Giulian Ioan	11:11	September 11 on Kaufland Romania's YouTube channel September 13 on X Factor Romania's YouTube channel
2	Alex Mica; Super 4	11:43	September 20 on X Factor Romania's YouTube channel
3	Mistah White; Naomi Hedman	14:17	September 27
4	Apollo & Artemis; Bianca Mihai; Alexia Lupea	15:27	October 4
5	Sorin Ene; Chriss Casper; Arthur Horeanu	12:37	October 11
6	Denis Costea; Marina Vlad; Marcel Souza	15:13	October 18
7	Iulian Canaf; Kalon Rae	11:53	October 24
8	Alexandru Stamate; Ioan Păduraru; Lakeetra Knowles	16:22	November 1
9	Sara Memba; INDEPENDENȚII	11:18	November 7
10	—	8:06	November 14
11	Katarina Dyer; Robert Botezan	13:25	November 18
12	—	8:02	November 21

== Ratings ==
Phase	#	Original airdate	National			Urban			Commercial 18-49			Source
Phase	#	Original airdate	Average (thousands)	Rating (%)	Share (%)	Average (thousands)	Rating (%)	Share (%)	Average (thousands)	Rating (%)	Share (%)	Source
Auditions	1	September 11	911	5.2	13.2	379	4.0	10.7	152	3.6	12.8	
Auditions	2	September 18	1.159	6.6	16.2	580	6.1	15.8	202	4.8	16.7	
Auditions	3	September 25	1.164	6.6	16.4	623	6.5	16.9	223	5.5	19.2	
Auditions	4	October 2	1.224	7.0	16.5	638	6.7	16.8	268	6.4	21.0	
Auditions	5	October 9	1.164	6.6	14.5	583	6.1	14.3	222	5.3	15.5	
Auditions	6	October 16	1 268	7.2	16.4	714	7.5	17.9	259	6.2	19.3	
Auditions	7	October 23	1 079	6.1	13.9	577	6.0	14.7	237	5.7	18.2	
Auditions	8	October 30	1 186	6.7	15.1	667	7.0	16.1	237	5.7	17.6	
Auditions	9	November 6	1 223	7.0	16.2	657	6.9	16.3	265	6.3	19.0	
Auditions	10	November 12										
Auditions	11	November 13										
