= Maia Mălăncuș =

Romanian singer and actress (born 2007)

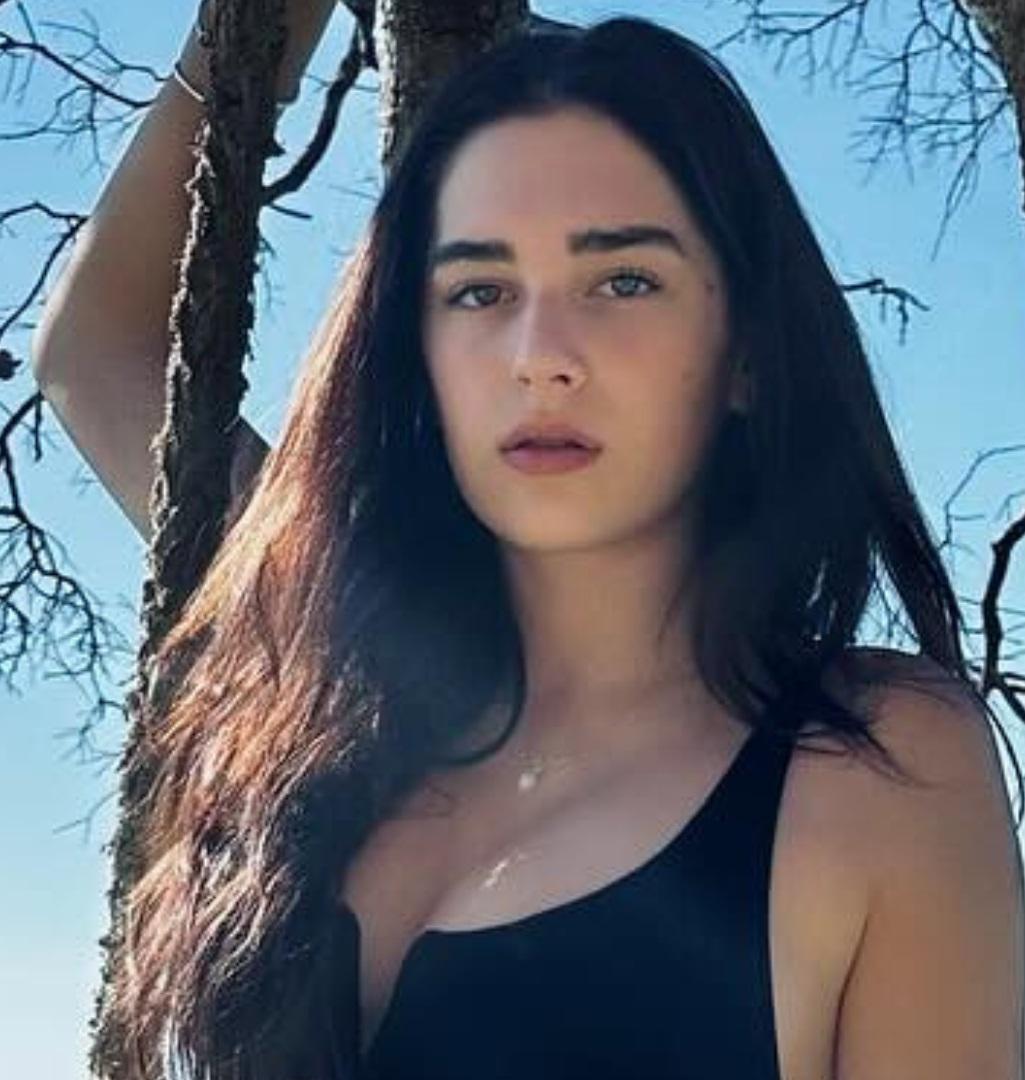
- Maia in 2023.
- Born: Maia Ștefania Mălăncuș; 5 February 2007 (age 19); Iași, Romania
- Occupations: Singer; voice-dubbing actress
- Musical career
- Genres: Pop
- Instrument: Vocals
- Years active: 2017–present
- Labels: Cat Music; MediaPro; TETA

Maia Ștefania Mălăncuș (Romanian pronunciation: [ˈmaja ʃtefaˈni.a məˈlənkuʃ]; born 5 February 2007), known professionally as Maia Mălăncuș, is a Romanian singer and voice-dubbing actress. She was the winner of season one of the Pro TV series The Voice Kids Romania.

In 2022, her country's press cited her as one of the "best voices" of Romania's emerging music scene. A year later, a foreign media outlet described her as the "young pop sensation".

== Early life ==
At an early age, she learned to play violin at the Children's Palace and perfected her skills at the Costache Negruzzi National College, both in Iași. She also participated in local violin, ballet and opera competitions, achieving victory in several of them.

By 2014, she participated in the tenth edition of the Next Star program, of which she was a winner at the age of 7.

== 2017–present: victory in Vocea României Junior and consolidation as a soloist ==
In 2017, Maia gained greater renown after participating in the first season of Vocea României Junior. In this, she was coached by singer Marius Moga and was consecrated as the winner of the program. In recognition, she received a trophy and €50,000 that she could use when she reaches the age of majority (18 years old in Romania).

In 2019, she lends her voice for the Romanian dubbing of her character as 'Nala cub' in the live-action film The Lion King and three years later she is hired to play the voice of 'Meilin "Mei" Lee' in Turning Red, both Disney productions.

In 2020, she auditioned for X Factor.

In September 2022, she was encouraged by her manager to move to Bucharest to finish her studies at the Gheorghe Lazăr National College, a school that specializes in teaching mathematics.

== Personal interests ==
Some of her main hobbies are painting and playing piano. In sports are tennis and taekwondo. She has also been seen practicing scuba diving and horseback riding.

== Discography ==
=== Singles ===
==== As lead artist ====
List of singles, with selected chart positions
Title	Year	Peak chart positions	
Title	Year	ROM	
Title	Year	Noutati Muzicale	Popnable
"Vreau să zbor" (featuring ADDA)	2017	—	
"Noi Nu Plecăm De Aici"	2018	—	
"Îți place și ție" (featuring Ioana Ignat)	2021	—	226
"Te aduc înapoi"	2022	—	
"Chewing Gum"	2022	—	494
"N-am fost niciodată singuri"	2023	42	307
"Badass Girl" (featuring OnSake)	2023	—	
"All Good Things (Come To An End)" (featuring Iordan and OnSake)	2023	—	
"3 primaveri"	202?	—	
"—" denotes a recording that did not chart.
