= Bretan =

Bretan is a surname. Notable people with the surname include:

- Laura Bretan (born 2002), Romanian-American soprano singer
- Nicolae Bretan (1887–1968), Romanian opera composer, baritone, conductor, and music critic
