= Vocea României season 9 =

Vocea României
- Season 9
- Hosted by: Pavel Bartoș
- Coaches: Tudor Chirilă; Horia Brenciu; Irina Rimes; Smiley
- Winner: Dragoș Moldovan
- Winning coach: Tudor Chirilă
- Runner-up: Andi Țolea
- No. of episodes: 16

Release
- Original network: ProTV
- Original release: September 6 – December 20, 2019

Season chronology
- ← Previous; Season 8 Next → Season 10

The ninth season of the Romanian reality talent show Vocea României premiered on ProTV on September 6, 2019.Irina Rimes, Tudor Chirilă and Smiley returned as coaches, while Horia Brenciu, who last coached in the third season, returned, replacing Andra. Meanwhile, Pavel Bartoș returned for his ninth season as host.

== Auditions ==
Cities where the pre-selections were held.

The open call auditions were held in the following locations:

Date	Audition venue	Location
March 24, 2019	NH Timișoara	Timișoara
March 31, 2019	Golden Tulip Ana Dome	Cluj-Napoca
April 7, 2019	Hotel Unirea	Iași
April 13–14, 2019	Hotel InterContinental	Bucharest

== Teams ==
Color key

- Winner
- Runner-up
- Third place
- Fourth place
- Eliminated in the Live Shows
- Stolen in the Knockout rounds
- Eliminated in the Knockout rounds
- Eliminated in the Battle rounds

Coaches	Top 61 artists				
Tudor Chirilă					
Tudor Chirilă	Dragoș Moldovan	Mădălina Lefter	Gabriel Bîscoveanu	Ana Maria Ioana	George Aghinea
Tudor Chirilă	Bogdan Ghirău	~~Mădălin Antonesei~~	~~Jasmina Răsădean~~	~~Maria Farcaș~~	Andreea Ciocoi
Tudor Chirilă	Aneta Gașpar	Carmelina Burdenciuc	Cătălina Pop	Mădălina Horeanu	Natalia Selegean
Tudor Chirilă	Britta Seidner				
Smiley					
Smiley	Andi Țolea	Elena Ilie	Renee Santana	Maria Farcaș	Yaser Ramadan
Smiley	Zoe Grigoraș	~~Diandra Bancu~~	~~Gabriel Bîscoveanu~~	Vasile Bulgaru	Iuliana Preda
Smiley	Daniela Răduică	Alexandru Ciubotaru	Kévin Magalhães	Doru Ciutacu	Ana Nica Vacari
Smiley	Dragoș Alecsă	Daniel Tudor			
Irina Rimes					
Irina Rimes	Jasmina Răsădean	Bogdan Dumitraș	Amanda Aprotosoaei	Mădălin Antonesei	Cristina Dima
Irina Rimes	Emanuela Gherasim	Jovana & Jelena Milovanović	Eugeniu Cotruță	Victoria Gudima	Cătălina Antal
Irina Rimes	Maria Crăciun	Diana Codrea	Alessandro Dănescu	Marina Arsene	Lia Burg
Irina Rimes	Lavinia Băjinaru	Mihaela Romilă			
Horia Brenciu					
Horia Brenciu	Elena Bozian	Adriana Simionescu	Oana & Răzvan Ailoae	Nunzio Mastrangelo	Diandra Bancu
Horia Brenciu	Luiza Constantin	Viana & Cristina Deliu	Iulia Glăvan	Alexandru Bugan	Teodor Danici
Horia Brenciu	Lisa Calotă	Otilia Gogu	Roberto Asoltanei	Claudia Badea	Mălina Ciarnău
Horia Brenciu	Chris Tapor				
Note: Italicized names are stolen contestants (names struck through within former teams).

== Blind auditions ==
Color key

✔	Coach pressed "I WANT YOU" button
	Artist defaulted to a coach's team
	Artist elected a coach's team
	Artist was eliminated
✘	Coach pressed the "I want you" button, but was blocked by Tudor from getting the artist
✘	Coach pressed the "I want you" button, but was blocked by Smiley from getting the artist
✘	Coach pressed the "I want you" button, but was blocked by Irina from getting the artist
✘	Coach pressed the "I want you" button, but was blocked by Brenciu from getting the artist

=== Episode 1 (September 6) ===
The first episode aired on September 6, 2019. The coaches performed "In the Air Tonight" at the start of the show.

Order	Artist	Age	Hometown	Song	Coach's and artist's choices			
Order	Artist	Age	Hometown	Song	Tudor	Smiley	Irina	Brenciu
1	Mădălina Lefter	24	Iași, Iași	"It's a Man's Man's Man's World"	✔	✔	✔	✔
2	Florian Țugui	25	Craiova, Dolj	"Sex Bomb"	—	—	—	—
3	Zoe Grigoraș	26	Pitești, Argeș	"We Found Love"	—	✔	✔	—
4	Bogdan Dumitraș	28	Botoșani, Botoșani	"Grace Kelly"	✔	✔	✔	✔
5	Dana Markitan	39	Chișinău, Moldova	"Arlekino"	—	—	—	—
6	Iuliana Preda	29	Câmpina, Prahova	"Lost on You"	—	✔	✔	—
7	Mălina Ciarnău	22	Marghita, Bihor	"Tennessee Whiskey"	✔	—	—	✔
8	Daniel Tudor	26	Timișoara, Timiș	"The Real Slim Shady"	—	✔	✔	✔
9	Camelia Miloș	22	Turnu Măgurele, Teleorman	"Give It to Me Right"	—	—	—	—
10	Luiza Constantin	29	Craiova, Dolj	"Rehab"	✔	✔	✔	✔
11	Liana Grigorescu	31	Bucharest	"Señorita" & "Lose Yourself"	—	—	—	—
12	Bogdan Ghirău	24	Vulcan, Hunedoara	"Come Together"	✔	—	✔	✔

=== Episode 2 (September 13) ===
The second episode aired on September 13, 2019.

Order	Artist	Age	Hometown	Song	Coach's and artist's choices			
Order	Artist	Age	Hometown	Song	Tudor	Smiley	Irina	Brenciu
1	Jasmina Răsădean	20	Arad, Arad	"I Put a Spell on You"	✔	✔	✔	✔
2	Cezar Gună	25	Alexandria, Teleorman	"Cry Me a River"	—	—	—	—
3	Patricia Buliga	24	Rădăuți, Suceava	"Don't You Remember"	—	—	—	—
4	Alexandru Bugan	24	Bucharest	"Road to Zion"	—	—	✔	✔
5	Maria Marton	21	Petroșani, Hunedoara	"Scared to Be Lonely"	—	—	—	—
6	Dragoș Alecsă	23	Onești, Bacău	"Take Me to Church"	—	✔	✔	✔
7	Emanuela Gherasim	25	Aiud, Alba	"I See Fire"	—	✔	✔	✔
8	Radu Rupiță	36	Bucharest	"Yo Cousin Vinny"	—	—	—	—
9	Alexandra Boghici	34	Piatra Neamț, Neamț	"Flames"	—	—	—	—
10	Marina Arsene	28	Pitești, Argeș	"Dream a Little Dream of Me"	✔	✔	✔	✔
11	Ancuța Stegaru	34	Rovinari, Gorj	"Attention"	—	—	—	—
12	Doru Ciutacu	23	Bucharest	"Treat You Better"	—	✔	—	—
13	Alessandro Dănescu	26	Bucharest	"You Know I'm No Good"	✔	✔	✔	✔

=== Episode 3 (September 20) ===
The third episode aired on September 20, 2019.

Order	Artist	Age	Hometown	Song	Coach's and artist's choices			
Order	Artist	Age	Hometown	Song	Tudor	Smiley	Irina	Brenciu
1	Gabriel Bîscoveanu	20	Slatina, Olt	"In My Blood"	—	✔	✔	✔
2	Daniela Răduică	54	Bucharest	"Mai rămâi și nu pleca, iubirea mea"	—	✔	✔	—
3	Viana & Cristina Deliu	43 & 46	Vitry-sur-Seine, France	"Mon mec à moi"	—	✔	—	✔
4	Cristina Dima	28	Iași, Iași	"Your Heart Is As Black As Night"	✔	—	✔	—
5	Chris Tapor	60	Paris, France	"Ne me quitte pas"	—	—	—	✔
6	Adriana Simionescu	19	Bucharest	"My Kind of Love"	—	—	—	✔
7	Octavian Popa	40	Cluj-Napoca, Cluj	"Cheek to Cheek"	—	—	—	—
8	Maria Farcaș	21	Vulcan, Hunedoara	"Seven Nation Army"	✔	✔	✔	✔
9	Maria Crăciun	21	Galați, Galați	"Proud Mary"	—	—	✔	—
10	Renee Santana	33	Mexico City, Mexico	"Thank U"	✔	✔	✔	✔
11	Tudor Pletea	33	Iași, Iași	"Crazy Little Thing Called Love"	—	—	—	—
12	Andreea Ciocoi	25	Bucharest	"Am I The One"	✔	✔	✔	✔

=== Episode 4 (September 27) ===
The fourth episode aired on September 27, 2019.

Order	Artist	Age	Hometown	Song	Coach's and artist's choices			
Order	Artist	Age	Hometown	Song	Tudor	Smiley	Irina	Brenciu
1	Diandra Bancu	19	Roman, Neamț	"Inimă nu fi de piatră"	✔	✔	✔	✔
2	Kévin Magalhães	34	Bourges, France	"She's Out of My Life"	✔	✔	✔	✔
3	Mădălina Horeanu	40	Botoșani, Botoșani	"Shallow"	✔	✔	✘	✔
4	Răzvan Dumitru	29	—	"I'm Yours"	—	—	—	—
5	Jovana & Jelena Milovanović	26 & 29	Doncaster, United Kingdom	"Crazy"	—	—	✔	✔
6	Radu Palaniță	43	Bucharest	"Home"	—	—	—	—
7	Roberto Asoltanei	25	Kapfenberg, Austria	"Love Someone"	—	✔	—	✔
8	Elena Bozian	26	Pitești, Argeș	"Feel It Still"	—	—	—	✔
9	Ana Nica Vacari	28	Bălți, Moldova	"Always Remember Us This Way"	—	✔	✔	✔
10	Gabriel Tora	49	Mangalia, Constanța	"It's Now or Never"	—	—	—	—
11	Ana Maria Telefca	35	Mangalia, Constanța	"Nothing Breaks Like a Heart"	—	—	—	—
12	Andreea Metehău	21	Galați, Galați	"Addicted to You"	—	—	—	—
13	Dragoș Moldovan	24	Timișoara, Timiș	"Feeling Good"	✔	✔	✔	✔

=== Episode 5 (October 4) ===
The fifth episode aired on October 4, 2019.

Order	Artist	Age	Hometown	Song	Coach's and artist's choices			
Order	Artist	Age	Hometown	Song	Tudor	Smiley	Irina	Brenciu
1	Cătălina Pop	28	Timișoara, Timiș	"I'm So Excited"	✔	—	✔	✔
2	Natalia Selegean	35	Oradea, Bihor	"Zig Zagga"	✔	—	✔	—
3	Delia Baltariu	26	Bucharest	"You Don't Own Me"	—	—	—	—
4	Alexandru Ciubotaru	34	Timișoara, Timiș	"Valea Regilor"	—	✔	—	—
5	Claudia Badea	32	Bucharest	"Nu Știi Tu Să Fii Bărbat"	—	—	—	✔
6	George Aghinea	20	Bucharest	"Redbone"	✔	✘	✔	✔
7	Eugeniu Cotruță	27	Chișinău, Moldova	"Iron Sky"	—	—	✔	✔
8	Victoria Gudima	29	Chișinău, Moldova	"I'd Rather Go Blind"	—	—	✔	—
9	Silvana Tușinean	29	Timișoara, Timiș	"Peggy Lee"	—	—	—	—
10	Mihaela Frimu	27	Chișinău, Moldova	"Son of a Preacher Man"	—	—	—	—
11	Carmelina Burdeniuc	19	Bălți, Moldova	"Hurt"	✔	—	—	—
12	Radu Preda	19	Arad, Arad	"All I Want"	—	—	—	—
13	Tina Roman	27	Galați, Galați	"Memory"	—	—	—	—
14	Elena Ilie	21	Pașcani, Iași	"Black Hole Sun"	—	✔	—	✔

=== Episode 6 (October 11) ===
The sixth episode aired on October 11, 2019.

Order	Artist	Age	Hometown	Song	Coach's and artist's choices			
Order	Artist	Age	Hometown	Song	Tudor	Smiley	Irina	Brenciu
1	Otilia Gogu	47	Mărășești, Vrancea	"Don't Cry For Louie"	✔	✔	✔	✔
2	Flavia Chelariu	20	Arad, Arad	"Of, inimioară"	—	—	—	—
3	Cătălina Antal	31	Bucharest	"Believer"	—	—	✔	✔
4	Mihaela Romilă	32	Iași, Iași	"River"	—	—	✔	—
5	Adrian Istrate	21	Pitești, Argeș	"Septembrie, luni"	—	—	—	—
6	Iulia Glăvan	45	Iași, Iași	"Clown"	✔	—	✔	✔
7	Alexandru Maxim	28	Iași, Iași	"Way Down We Go"	—	—	—	—
8	Teodor Mirea	22	Bucharest	"Another Love"	—	—	—	—
9	Teodor Danici	19	Constanța, Constanța	"All This Love"	—	—	—	✔
10	George Știrbăț	47	Târgu Trotuș, Bacău	"Delilah"	—	—	—	—
11	Magdalena Drăgoi	19	Suceava, Suceava	"Million Years Ago"	—	—	—	—
12	Vasile Bulgaru	26	Alba Iulia, Alba	"Say You Won't Let Go"	—	✔	—	—
13	Viola Julea	45	Chișinău, Moldova	"Ex's & Oh's"	—	—	—	—
14	Eugenia Nicolae	28	Slatina, Olt	"7 Rings"	—	—	—	—
15	Naomi Prie	22	Câmpina, Prahova	"Say Something"	—	—	—	—
16	Diana Codrea	22	Sighetul Marmației, Maramureș	"Ziua Vrăjitoarelor"	✘	✔	✔	✔

=== Episode 7 (October 18) ===
The seventh episode aired on October 18, 2019.

Order	Artist	Age	Hometown	Song	Coach's and artist's choices			
Order	Artist	Age	Hometown	Song	Tudor	Smiley	Irina	Brenciu
1	Mihai Jipa	64	Ploiești, Argeș	"Everything"	—	—	—	—
2	Ana Maria Ioana	22	Sibiu, Sibiu	"Mamma Knows Best"	✔	✔	✔	✔
3	Nunzio Mastrangelo	36	Palagiano, Italy	"Locked Out of Heaven"	—	—	—	✔
4	Bogdan Sabău	26	Târgu Mureș, Mureș	"I'm Not the Only One"	—	—	—	—
5	Cătălina Borozan	26	Soroca, Moldova	"Love on the Brain"	—	—	—	—
6	Mădălin Antonesei	30	Botoșani, Botoșani	"Angels"	✔	✔	—	✔
7	Lisa Calotă	19	Bucharest	"Call Out My Name"	—	—	—	✔
8	Ioan Nicoară	60	Feleacu, Cluj	"Merit eu"	—	—	—	—
9	David Todoran	38	Cluj-Napoca, Cluj	"Are You Gonna Go My Way"	—	—	—	—
10	Adela Todoran	31	Cluj-Napoca, Cluj	"Jolene"	—	—	—	—
11	Lia Burg	25	Timișoara, Timiș	"Cosmic Love"	—	✔	✔	—
12	Adina Drăgoescu	38	Oradea, Bihor	"What About Us"	—	—	—	—
13	Katalina Rusu	33	Chișinău, Moldova	"Invitat"	—	—	—	—
14	Yaser Ramadan	32	Florence, Italy	"Somebody to Love"	✘	✔	—	✔

=== Episode 8 (October 25) ===
The eighth and last blind audition episode aired on October 25, 2019.

Order	Artist	Age	Hometown	Song	Coach's and artist's choices			
Order	Artist	Age	Hometown	Song	Tudor	Smiley	Irina	Brenciu
1	Diana Iftimie	22	Năsăud, Bistrița-Năsăud	"Raggamuffin"	—	—	—	—
2	Aneta Gașpar	25	Vârșeț, Serbia	"Personal Jesus"	✔	—	—	✔
3	Paula Nedelcu	31	Bucharest	"Are You Gonna Be My Girl"	—	—	—	—
4	Amanda Aprotosoaei	21	Cluj-Napoca, Cluj	"Idontwannabeyouanymore"	—	—	✔	—
5	Lior Bebera	41	Bucharest	"Right Here Waiting"	—	—	—	—
6	Lavinia Băjinaru	33	Ploiești, Prahova	"Canção do Mar"	—	—	✔	—
7	Oana & Răzvan Ailoae	32 & 34	Iași, Iași	"Like I'm Gonna Lose You"	✔	—	—	✔
8	Paula Sabău	21	Târgu Mureș, Mureș	"Hero"	—	—	—	—
9	Patricia Mărginean	27	Cluj-Napoca, Cluj	"Symphony"	—	—	—	—
10	Britta Seidner	37	Sibiu, Sibiu	"Give Me One Reason"	✔	—	—	—
11	Andreea Maletici	34	Bucharest	"Foolish Games"	—	—	—	—
12	Andi Țolea	21	Arad, Arad	"Make It Rain"	✔	✔	✔	✔

== Knockout rounds ==
The Knockout round started on November 1 after the final blind auditions. The artists from each team were split up into groups of three. At the end of each knockout round the coach then decided out of the three artists who won. The coaches can each steal one losing artist from another team. The top 24 contestants then move on to the Battles round.

Colour key:

Artist won the Knockouts and advanced to the Live shows
Artist lost the Knockouts but was stolen by another coach and advanced to the Live shows
Artist lost the Knockouts and was eliminated

=== Episode 9 (1 November) ===
The ninth episode aired on November 1, 2019.

Coach	Order	Artist	Song	'Steal' result			
Coach	Order	Artist	Song	Tudor	Smiley	Irina	Brenciu
Smiley	1	Renee Santana	"Karma Police"	Ineligible			
Smiley	2	Dragoș Alecsă	"Hold Back the River"	—	∅	—	—
Smiley	3	Daniel Tudor	"Sing for the Moment" / "Dream On"	—	∅	—	—
Tudor Chirilă	4	Natalia Selegean	"Love Reign Over Me"	∅	—	—	—
Tudor Chirilă	5	Dragoș Moldovan	"Painkiller"	Ineligible			
Tudor Chirilă	6	Britta Seidner	"The Other Woman"	∅	—	—	—
Irina Rimes	7	Mihaela Romilă	"Man Down"	—	—	∅	—
Irina Rimes	8	Lavinia Băjinaru	"Cine iubește și lasă"	—	—	∅	—
Irina Rimes	9	Bogdan Dumitraș	"Finesse" / "Remember the Time"	Ineligible			
Horia Brenciu	10	Mălina Ciarnău	"Never Tear Us Apart"	—	—	—	∅
Horia Brenciu	11	Chris Tapor	"I've Got You Under My Skin"	—	—	—	∅
Horia Brenciu	12	Elena Bozian	"Crazy"	Ineligible			
Tudor Chirilă	13	Mădălina Horeanu	"Love Is Blindness"	∅	—	—	—
Tudor Chirilă	14	George Aghinea	"If I Get High"	Ineligible			
Tudor Chirilă	15	Maria Farcaș	"Lover to Lover"	∅	✔	✔	—

=== Episode 10 (8 November) ===
The tenth episode aired on November 8, 2019.

Coach	Order	Artist	Song	'Steal' result			
Coach	Order	Artist	Song	Tudor	Smiley	Irina	Brenciu
Horia Brenciu	1	Roberto Asoltanei	"A Change Is Gonna Come"	—	—	—	∅
Horia Brenciu	2	Claudia Badea	"I'm Outta Love"	—	—	—	∅
Horia Brenciu	3	Nunzio Mastrangelo	"Don't Stop Believin'"	Ineligible			
Smiley	4	Ana Nica Vacari	"Love On Top"	—	∅	—	—
Smiley	5	Doru Ciutacu	"Hotel California"	—	∅	—	—
Smiley	6	Elena Ilie	"Seven Nation Army"	Ineligible			
Irina Rimes	7	Lia Burg	"What's Up?"	—	—	∅	—
Irina Rimes	8	Marina Arsene	"Teardrop"	—	—	∅	—
Irina Rimes	9	Cristina Dima	"Shape of You"	Ineligible			
Tudor Chirilă	10	Carmelina Burdeniuc	"Instant Crush"	∅	—	—	—
Tudor Chirilă	11	Mădălina Lefter	"Golden Slumbers" / "Carry That Weight"	Ineligible			
Tudor Chirilă	12	Cătălina Pop	"Alone"	∅	—	—	—
Smiley	13	Kévin Magalhães	"Tous les mêmes"	—	∅	—	—
Smiley	14	Andi Țolea	"I Will Always Love You"	Ineligible			
Smiley	15	Alexandru Ciubotaru	"Razie"	—	∅	—	—
Smiley	16	Gabriel Bîscoveanu	"Can't Help Falling in Love"	✔	∅	—	—
Irina Rimes	17	Alessandro Dănescu	"Love Runs Out"	—	—	∅	—
Irina Rimes	18	Jovana & Jelena Milovanović	"Shameless"	Ineligible			
Irina Rimes	19	Diana Codrea	"Desire"	—	—	∅	—

=== Episode 11 (15 November) ===
The eleventh episode aired on November 15, 2019.

Coach	Order	Artist	Song	'Steal' result			
Coach	Order	Artist	Song	Tudor	Smiley	Irina	Brenciu
Smiley	1	Daniela Răduică	"I (Who Have Nothing)"	—	∅	—	—
Smiley	2	Yaser Ramadan	"Kiss"	Ineligible			
Smiley	3	Iuliana Preda	"Bird Set Free"	—	∅	—	—
Tudor Chirilă	4	Aneta Gașpar	"Wings"	∅	—	—	—
Tudor Chirilă	5	Jasmina Răsădean	"Sail"	∅	—	✔	✔
Tudor Chirilă	6	Bogdan Ghirău	"Life on Mars"	Ineligible			
Horia Brenciu	7	Lisa Calotă	"I'll Never Love Again "	—	—	—	∅
Horia Brenciu	8	Otilia Gogu	"Woman in Love"	—	—	—	∅
Horia Brenciu	9	Oana & Răzvan Ailoae	"Sugar"	Ineligible			

=== Episode 12 (22 November) ===
The twelfth episode aired on November 22, 2019.

Coach	Order	Artist	Song	'Steal' result			
Coach	Order	Artist	Song	Tudor	Smiley	Irina	Brenciu
Horia Brenciu	1	Alexandru Bulgaru	"Where Is the Love?"	—	—	—	∅
Horia Brenciu	2	Teodor Danici	"I Believe I Can Fly"	—	—	—	∅
Horia Brenciu	3	Adriana Simionescu	"Who's Lovin' You"	Ineligible			
Irina Rimes	4	Maria Crăciun	"It's Oh So Quiet"	—	—	∅	—
Irina Rimes	5	Cătălina Antal	"No Roots"	—	—	∅	—
Irina Rimes	6	Emanuela Gherasim	"Shelter"	Ineligible			
Smiley	7	Zoe Grigoraș	"Hotline Bling"	Ineligible			
Smiley	8	Vasile Bulgaru	"Don't Stop the Music"	—	∅	—	—
Smiley	9	Diandra Bancu	"Que Sera, Sera"	—	∅	—	✔
Horia Brenciu	10	Luiza Constantin	"(You Make Me Feel Like) A Natural Woman"	Ineligible			
Horia Brenciu	11	Viana & Cristina Deliu	"Trouble"	—	—	—	∅
Horia Brenciu	12	Iulia Glăvan	"Alive"	—	—	—	∅
Tudor Chirilă	13	Mădălin Antonesei	"Here I Go Again"	—	∅	✔	✔
Tudor Chirilă	14	Ana Maria Ioana	"Whore"	Ineligible			
Tudor Chirilă	15	Andreea Ciocoi	"Don't Wanna Fight"	∅	—	—	—
Irina Rimes	16	Victoria Gudima	"Toxic"	—	—	∅	—
Irina Rimes	17	Eugeniu Cotruță	"Do I Wanna Know?"	—	—	∅	—
Irina Rimes	18	Amanda Aprotosoaei	"Ice Ice Baby"	Ineligible			

== The Battles ==
After the Knockauts, Team Brenciu and Team Smiley and Team Tudor had six contestants, while Team Irina had seven contestants for the Battle rounds. The Battles rounds started with episode 13 on November 29, 2019. Coaches began narrowing down the playing field by training the contestants. Each battle concluding with the respective coach advancing one of the two or three contestants.

Color key:

Artist won the Battle and advanced to the Knockouts
Artist lost the Battle but was stolen by another coach and advanced to the Live shows
Artist lost the Battle and was eliminated

=== Episode 13 (29 November) ===
The thirteenth episode aired on November 29, 2019.

Coach	Order	Winner	Song	Loser
Tudor Chirilă	1	Gabriel Bîscoveanu	"Under Pressure"	Bogdan Ghirău
Smiley	2	Andi Țolea	"Lovely"	Zoe Grigoraș
Irina Rimes	3	Bogdan Dumitraș	"Higher Ground"	Jovana & Jelena Milovanović
Horia Brenciu	4	Elena Bozian	"California Dreamin'"	Luiza Constantin
Tudor Chirilă	5	Mădălina Lefter	"How Deep Is Your Love"	George Aghinea
Irina Rimes	6	Amanda Aprotosoaei	"This World"	Cristina Dima
Irina Rimes	6	Amanda Aprotosoaei	"This World"	Emanuela Gherasim
Smiley	7	Renee Santana	"Sign of the Times"	Yaser Ramadan
Horia Brenciu	8	Oana & Răzvan Ailoae	"Mercy"	Diandra Bancu
Tudor Chirilă	9	Dragoș Moldovan	"Just a Fool"	Ana Maria Ioana
Smiley	10	Elena Ilie	"Sympathy for the Devil"	Maria Farcaș
Horia Brenciu	11	Adriana Simionescu	"Survivor"	Nunzio Mastrangelo
Irina Rimes	12	Jasmina Răsădean	"Another Way to Die"	Mădălin Antonesei

== Live shows ==
Color key:

Artist was saved by the Public's votes
Artist was eliminated

=== Week 1 (6 December) ===
All 12 remaining contestants competed in the first live show on Friday, December 6, 2019. The public vote could save two contestants from each team, the other one was eliminated.

Episode 14 (December 6)
Coach	Order	Artist	Song	Result
Smiley	1	Elena Ilie	"Imagine"	Public vote
Smiley	2	Renee Santana	"When the Party's Over"	Eliminated
Smiley	3	Andi Țolea	"Without You"	Public vote
Irina Rimes	4	Amanda Aprotosoaei	"Creep"	Eliminated
Irina Rimes	5	Bogdan Dumitraș	"Writing's on the Wall"	Public vote
Irina Rimes	6	Jasmina Răsădean	"I Will Survive"	Public vote
Tudor Chirilă	7	Gabriel Bîscoveanu	"Sweet Child O' Mine"	Eliminated
Tudor Chirilă	8	Mădălina Lefter	"Nina Cried Power"	Public vote
Tudor Chirilă	9	Dragoș Moldovan	"The Winner Takes It All"	Public vote
Horia Brenciu	10	Oana & Răzvan Ailoae	"A Million Dreams"	Eliminated
Horia Brenciu	11	Elena Bozian	"Hoy Tengo Ganas de Ti"	Public vote
Horia Brenciu	12	Adriana Simionescu	"I Just Want to Make Love to You"	Public vote

Non-competition performances
Order	Performer	Song
1	Top 12	"Dream On"

=== Week 2 - Semi-final (13 December) ===
All eight remaining contestants performed two songs each in the semi-final on Friday, December 13, 2019: one solo song and a trio with the coach and the other teammate. The public vote could save one contestant from each team, the second one was eliminated.

Episode 15 (December 13)
Coach	Order	Artist	Solo Song	Order	Trio Song	Result
Horia Brenciu	2	Adriana Simionescu	"Who You Are"	6	"That's Life"	Eliminated
Horia Brenciu	11	Elena Bozian	"Forever Young"	6	"That's Life"	Public vote
Irina Rimes	3	Bogdan Dumitraș	"Who Wants to Live Forever"	10	"Blow"	Eliminated
Irina Rimes	8	Jasmina Răsădean	"Lume, lume, soro lume"	10	"Blow"	Public vote
Tudor Chirilă	4	Mădălina Lefter	"When Doves Cry"	12	"Calul din Malboro"	Eliminated
Tudor Chirilă	7	Dragoș Moldovan	"Always"	12	"Calul din Malboro"	Public vote
Smiley	5	Elena Ilie	"Dance Monkey"	1	"Oficial îmi merge bine"	Eliminated
Smiley	9	Andi Țolea	"Angels"	1	"Oficial îmi merge bine"	Public vote

=== Week 3 - Final (20 December) ===
The top 4 contestants performed in the grand final on Friday, December 20, 2019. This week, the four finalists performed a solo song, a duet with a special guest and a duet with their coach. The public vote determined the winner, and that resulted in a victory for Dragoș Moldovan, Tudor Chirilă's fourth victory as a coach.

== Elimination chart ==
Color key
Artist info

- Artist from Team Tudor
- Artist from Team Irina
- Artist from Team Smiley
- Artist from Team Brenciu

Result details

- Winner
- Runner-up
- Third place
- Fourth place
- Artist was saved by the public vote
- Artist was eliminated

=== Overall ===
Artists	Week 1	Week 2	Final
Dragoș Moldovan	Safe	Safe	Winner
Andi Țolea	Safe	Safe	Runner-up
Jasmina Răsădean	Safe	Safe	3rd Place
Elena Bozian	Safe	Safe	4th Place
Mădălina Lefter	Safe	Eliminated	Eliminated (Week 2)
Adriana Simionescu	Safe	Eliminated	Eliminated (Week 2)
Elena Ilie	Safe	Eliminated	Eliminated (Week 2)
Bogdan Dumitraș	Safe	Eliminated	Eliminated (Week 2)
Oana & Răzvan Ailoae	Eliminated	Eliminated (Week 1)	
Gabriel Bîscoveanu	Eliminated	Eliminated (Week 1)	
Amanda Aprotosoaei	Eliminated	Eliminated (Week 1)	
Renee Santana	Eliminated	Eliminated (Week 1)	

== Ratings ==
Episode		Original airdate	Timeslot (EET)	National				18–49			Source
Episode		Original airdate	Timeslot (EET)	Rank	Viewers (in thousands)	Rating (%)	Share (%)	Rank	Rating (%)	Share (%)	Source
1	"The Blind Auditions Premiere"	September 6, 2019	Friday, 20:30	1	1.673	9.4	24.4	1	9.7	36.9	
2	"The Blind Auditions, Part 2"	September 13, 2019	Friday, 20:30	1	1.437	8.1	19.2	1	7.3	24.8	
3	"The Blind Auditions, Part 3"	September 20, 2019	Friday, 20:30	1	1.870	10.5	23.8	1	9.7	29.4	
4	"The Blind Auditions, Part 4"	September 27, 2019	Friday, 20:30	1	1.587	8.9	21.1	1	7.7	23.3	
5	"The Blind Auditions, Part 5"	October 4, 2019	Friday, 20:30	1	1.806	10.2	22.1	1	9.0	24.8	
6	"The Blind Auditions, Part 6"	October 11, 2019	Friday, 20:30	1	1.642	9.2	20.2	1	7.7	24.1	
7	"The Blind Auditions, Part 7"	October 18, 2019	Friday, 20:30	1	1.588	8.9	20.4	1	7.4	24.0	
8	"The Blind Auditions, Part 8"	October 25, 2019	Friday, 20:30	1	1.720	9.7	21.4	1	9.9	28.5	
9	"The Knockouts Premiere"	November 1, 2019	Friday, 20:30	1	1.358	7.6	19.8	1	7.6	24.6	
10	"The Knockouts, Part 2"	November 8, 2019	Friday, 20:30	1	1.258	7.1	18.3	1	6.4	20.2	
11	"The Knockouts, Part 3"	November 15, 2019	Friday, 20:00	1	1.748	9.8	19.7	1	8.8	26.1	
12	"The Knockouts, Part 4"	November 22, 2019	Friday, 20:30	1	1.185	6.7	16.1	1	6.5	19.6	
13	"The Battles"	November 29, 2019	Friday, 20:30	2	1.399	7.9	16.2	2	8.1	22.4	
14	"Live show 1"	December 6, 2019	Friday, 20:30	2	1.079	6.1	15.5	1	5.8	19.0	
15	"Semifinal"	December 13, 2019	Friday, 20:30								
16	"Final"	December 20, 2019	Friday, 20:30								
