= Vocea României Junior season 1 =

Vocea României Junior
- Season 1
- Hosted by: Mihai Bobonete; Robert Tudor
- Judges: Andra; Inna; Marius Moga
- Winner: Maia Mălăncuș
- Winning coach: Marius Moga

Release
- Original network: Pro TV
- Original release: February 26 – April 9, 2017

Season chronology
- Next → Season 2

The first season of the Romanian reality talent show Vocea României Junior premiered on February 26, 2017 on Pro TV with Andra, Inna and Marius Moga as coaches.

The season finale aired on April 9, 2017. Maia Mălăncuș mentored by Marius Moga, was declared winner of the season.

== Coaches and presenters ==
Coaches

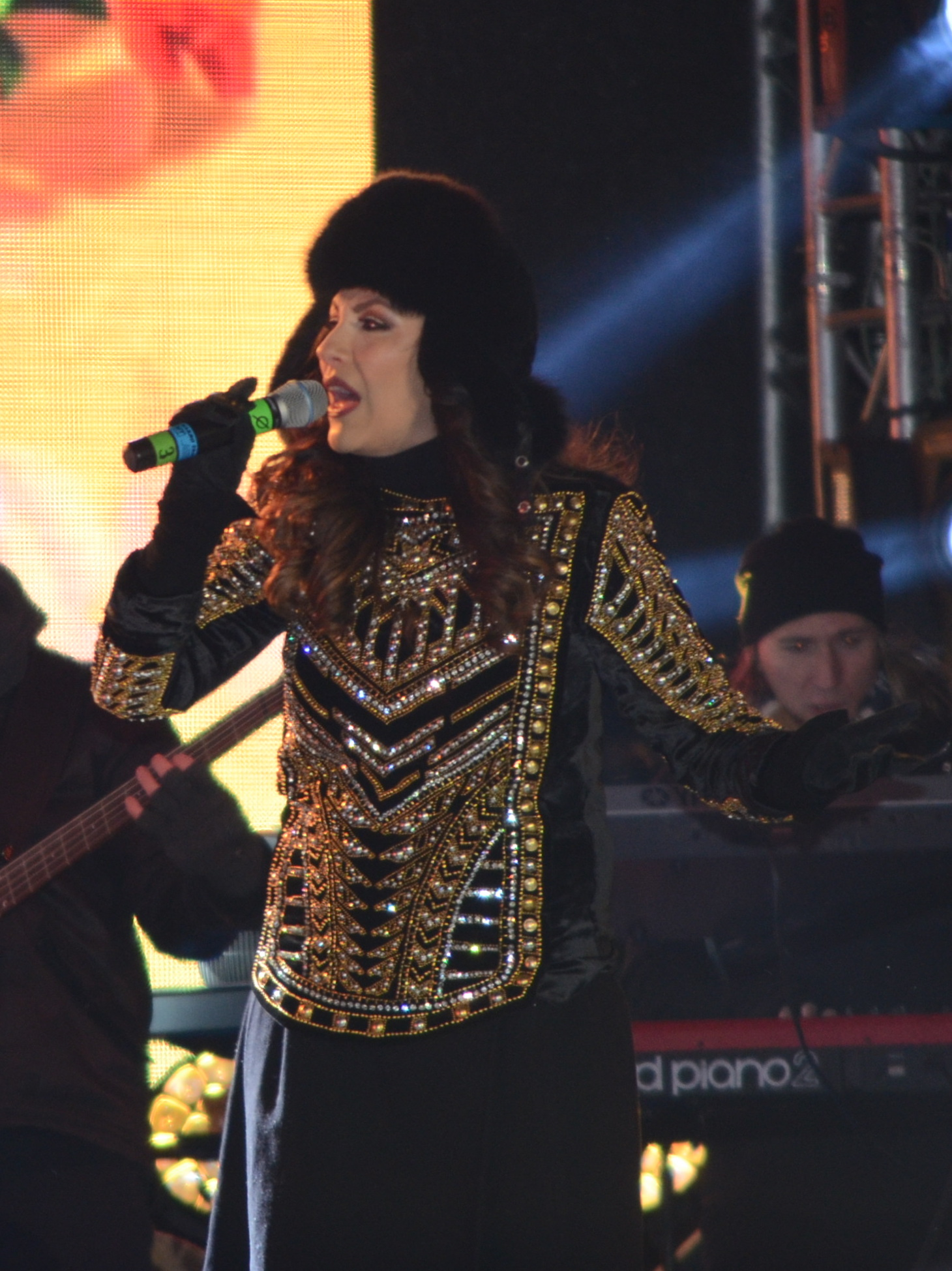
Andra

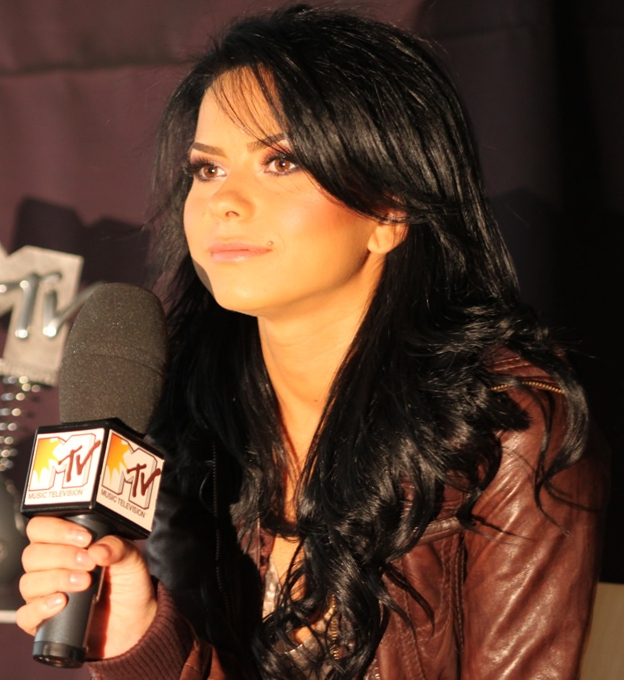
Inna

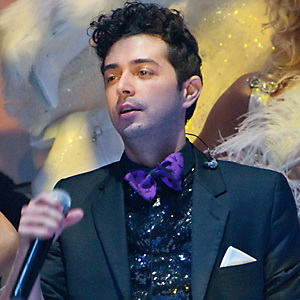
Marius Moga

=== Hosts ===
In July 2016 Mihai Bobonete and Robert Tudor were confirmed hosts for the Voice of Romania Junior.

=== Coaches ===
In June 2016 pop singer and judge at Românii au talent, Andra, singer, dancer and philanthropist, Inna and R'n'B musician, composer and adult show coach, Marius Moga were confirmed coaches for the Voice of Romania Junior.

== Selection process ==
Cities where the pre-selections were held.

Pre-selections took place in the following cities:

Date	Audition venue	Location
March 5, 2016	Hotel Kronwell	Brașov
March 12, 2016	Hotel Continental	Timișoara
March 19, 2016	Hotel Unirea	Iași
March 26, 2016	Golden Tulip Ana Dome	Cluj-Napoca
April 2–3, 2016	Hotel Ibis Gara de Nord	Bucharest

== Teams ==
Colour key:

- Winner
- Runner-up
- Third Place
- Eliminated in the Semi-final
- Eliminated in the Battles

Coaches	Top 27 artists		
Andra			
Andra	Karina Ștefan	Jessica Lăzărescu	Teodor Danci
Andra	Ioana Bulgaru	David Gheorghe	Daria Oprea
Andra	Melanie Șerban	Maria Răducanu	Giulia Tabără
Marius Moga			
Marius Moga	Maia Mălăncuș	Jennifer Dumitrașcu	Theodor Andrei
Marius Moga	Denisa Davidescu	Daria Rotaru	Adrian Ivan
Marius Moga	Diana Movilă	Ioan Ciurea	Estera Lepădatu
Inna			
Inna	Andrei Ciurez	Alexia Niculae	Voicu Dumitraș
Inna	Astrid Muthu	Andreea Sălăvăstru	Ștefan Badea
Inna	George Rotaru	Sonia Apostol	Eva Margină-Mileah

== Blind Auditions ==
Colour key

✔	Coach hit his/her "I WANT YOU" button
	Artist defaulted to this coach's team
	Artist elected to join this coach's team
	Artist eliminated with no coach pressing his or her "I WANT YOU" button

=== Episode 1 (February 26) ===
The first episode of The Blind Auditions aired on February 26, 2017.

Order	Artist	Age	Hometown	Song	Coach's and contestant's choices		
Order	Artist	Age	Hometown	Song	Andra	Moga	Inna
1	Jessica Lăzărescu	12	Târgu Jiu, Gorj	"Suus"	✔	✔	✔
2	Francesca Hojda	13	Sighetul Marmației, Maramureș	"She Wolf (Falling to Pieces)"	—	—	—
3	Ioan Ciurea	7	Brașov, Brașov	"Durli-Durli-Da"	✔	✔	—
4	Eva Margină-Mileah	12	Bucharest	"Jolene"	—	—	✔
5	Ana Maria Țîrcă	13	Râmnicu Vâlcea, Vâlcea	"Something's Got a Hold on Me"	—	—	—
6	Andrei Ciurez	12	Craiova, Dolj	"Highway to Hell"	—	—	✔
7	Daria Rotaru	11	Brașov, Brașov	"Sweet People"	—	✔	—
8	Daria Radu	9	Ploiești, Prahova	"Acapella"	—	—	—
9	Ștefan Badea	11	Schitu Golești, Argeș	"Belle"	—	—	✔
10	Karina Ștefan	11	Timișoara, Timiș	"Proud Mary"	✔	✔	✔

=== Episode 2 (March 5) ===
The second episode of the Blind Auditions aired on March 5, 2017.

Order	Artist	Age	Hometown	Song	Coach's and contestant's choices		
Order	Artist	Age	Hometown	Song	Andra	Moga	Inna
1	Maia Mălăncuș	9	Iași, Iași	"Bang Bang"	✔	✔	✔
2	Diana Mălăncuș	13	Iași, Iași	"Are You Gonna Be My Girl"	—	—	—
3	George Rotaru	13	Brăila, Brăila	"When I Was Your Man"	—	—	✔
4	Adina Bostan	8	Galați, Galați	"Lupii"	—	—	—
5	Alexia Niculae	10	Mioveni, Argeș	"Evil Like Me"	—	✔	✔
6	Adrian Ivan	12	Brașov, Brașov	"Billionaire"	—	✔	—
7	Daria Oprea	14	Bucharest	"Runnin' (Lose It All)"	✔	—	—
8	Theodor Andrei	11	Bucharest	"I Hate Myself for Loving You"	—	✔	—
9	Maria Răducanu	9	Bucharest	"Necessary Evil"	✔	✔	✔
10	David Burlacu	11	Constanța, Constanța	"Everybody Hurts"	—	—	—

=== Episode 3 (March 12) ===
The third episode of the Blind Auditions aired on March 12, 2017.

Order	Artist	Age	Hometown	Song	Coach's and contestant's choices		
Order	Artist	Age	Hometown	Song	Andra	Moga	Inna
1	Melanie Șerban	9	—	"Who's Lovin' You"	✔	✔	✔
2	Carla Sabău	8	Zalău, Sălaj	"De-ai fi tu salcie la mal"	—	—	—
3	Astrid Muthu	10	Oradea, Bihor	"Canção do mar"	—	—	✔
4	Oliver Lepădatu	8	Bucharest	"Fly Me to the Moon"	—	—	—
5	Esra Lepădatu	10	Bucharest	"Tomorrow"	—	✔	—
6	Denisa Davidescu	12	Bucharest	"Show Me How You Burlesque"	✔	✔	—
7	Darius Drăgoi	11	Bucharest	"Stitches"	—	—	—
8	Ioana Bulgaru	12	Galați, Galați	"I'm Not the Only One"	✔	—	—
9	David Gheorghe	13	Bucharest	"Summertime"	✔	✔	✔
10	Beatrice Florea	11	Iași, Iași	"Raggamuffin"	—	—	—
11	Sonia Apostol	14	Bucharest	"Cheap Thrills"	—	—	✔

=== Episode 4 (March 12) ===
The final episode of the Blind Auditions aired on March 19, 2017.

Order	Artist	Age	Hometown	Song	Coach's and contestant's choices		
Order	Artist	Age	Hometown	Song	Andra	Moga	Inna
1	Giulia Tabără	9	Giurgiu, Giutgiu	"If I Ain't Got You"	✔	✔	—
2	Andreea Irena Fabri	12	Nădlac, Arad	"Ardelean show	—	—	—
3	Voicu Dumitraș	12	Timișoara, Timiș	"Hurt"	—	—	✔
4	Jennifer Dumitrașcu	14	Bucharest	"Nobody's Perfect"	—	✔	✔
5	Alexandru Burloi	12	—	"Mon mec à moi"	—	—	—
6	Dalia Dobre	13	—	"Whole Lotta Love"	—	—	—
7	Teodor Danci	13	Constanța, Constanța	"Chains"	✔	—	✔
8	Diana Movilă	10	Galați, Galați	"What a Diff'rence a Day Makes"	—	✔	✔
9	Antonio Fernando Pican	13	Moreni, Dâmbovița	"Mă ucide ea"	—	—	—
10	Thea Marconi	11	Timișoara, Timiș	"I Will Never Let You Down"	—	—	—
11	Andreea Sălăvăstru	13	Iași, Iași	"That Man"	—	—	✔

== Battle rounds ==
After the Blind auditions, each coach had nine contestants for the Battle rounds. The Battles rounds aired on March 26. Coaches began narrowing down the playing field by training the contestants. Each battle concluding with the respective coach eliminating the two contestants.

Colour key

Artist won the Battle and advanced to the Semi-final
Artist lost the Battle and was eliminated

Coach	Order	Winner	Song	Losers	
Marius Moga	1	Maia Mălăncuș	"Tot mai sus"	Ioan Ciurea	Esra Lepădatu
Andra	2	Teodor Danci	"Flashlight"	Maria Răducanu	Giulia Tabără
Inna	3	Andrei Ciurez	"Ochii tăi"	Sonia Apostol	Eva Margină-Mileah
Marius Moga	4	Theodor Andrei	"Black or White"	Diana Movilă	Adrian Ivan
Andra	5	Karina Ștefan	"Chandelier"	Melanie Șerban	Daria Oprea
Inna	6	Voicu Dumitraș	"Love Yourself"	Ștefan Badea	George Rotaru
Marius Moga	7	Jennifer Dumitrașcu	"Empire State of Mind"	Denisa Davidescu	Daria Rotaru
Andra	8	Jessica Lăzărescu	"All of Me"	David Gheorghe	Ioana Bulgaru
Inna	9	Alexia Niculae	"No"	Astrid Muthu	Andreea Sălăvăstru

== Show details ==
=== Results summary ===
Team's colour key
Team Andra
Team Moga
Team Inna
Result's colour key
Artist received the most public votes
Artist was eliminated
Runner-up
Artist received the least public votes

Results per artist
Contestant	Semi-final	Final
Maia Mălăncuș	Safe	Winner (Week 2)
Karina Ștefan	Safe	Runner-up (Week 2)
Andrei Ciurez	Safe	Third Place (Week 2)
Theodor Andrei	Eliminated	Eliminated (Week 1)
Jennifer Dumitrașcu	Eliminated	Eliminated (Week 1)
Voicu Dumitraș	Eliminated	Eliminated (Week 1)
Alexia Niculae	Eliminated	Eliminated (Week 1)
Teodor Danci	Eliminated	Eliminated (Week 1)
Jessica Lăzărescu	Eliminated	Eliminated (Week 1)

== Live Shows ==
=== Semi-final (April 2) ===
The semi-final aired on April 2.

Coach	Order	Artist	Song	Result
Andra	1	Teodor Danci	"Thinking Out Loud"	Eliminated
Andra	2	Karina Ștefan	"Roar"	Advanced
Andra	3	Jessica Lăzărescu	"Adagio"	Eliminated
Inna	4	Voicu Dumitraș	"Writing's on the Wall"	Eliminated
Inna	5	Alexia Niculae	"Wrecking Ball"	Eliminated
Inna	6	Andrei Ciurez	"Whataya Want from Me"	Advanced
Marius Moga	7	Maia Mălăncuș	"Stone Cold"	Advanced
Marius Moga	8	Theodor Andrei	"Dream On"	Eliminated
Marius Moga	9	Jennifer Dumitrașcu	"Hero"	Eliminated

Non-competition performances
Order	Artist	Song
1	Team Moga, Team Andra and Team Inna	"It's a Hard-Knock Life"

=== Final (April 9) ===
The final show aired on April 9. This week, the three finalists performed a solo song, a duet with a special guest and a duet with their coach. The public vote determined the winner.

Coach	Artist	Order	Solo Song	Order	Duet Song (with coach)	Order	Duet Song (with special guest)	Result
Inna	Andrei Ciurez	1	"Beat It"	4	"Bop Bop"	7	"Pleacă" (with Vunk)	Third Place
Andra	Karina Ștefan	5	"Ain't Nobody"	2	"Iubirea schimbă tot"	9	"Cuvintele tale" (with Nicole Cherry)	Runner-up
Marius Moga	Maia Mălăncuș	8	"Girl on Fire"	6	"Pe barba mea"	3	"K la meteo" (with What's Up?)	Winner

Non-competition performances
Order	Artist	Song
1	Laura Bretan	"I Dreamed a Dream"
2	Feli	"Timpul"

== Ratings ==
Episode		Original airdate	Time slot (ET)	Rank	Viewers (in millions)	Rank	Adults (18–49)		Source
Episode		Original airdate	Time slot (ET)	Rank	Viewers (in millions)	Rank	Rating	Share	Source
1	"The Blind Auditions Premiere"	February 26, 2017	Sunday 8:30 p.m.	1	1.969	1	12.6	27.6	
2	"The Blind Auditions, Part 2"	March 5, 2017	Sunday 8:30 p.m.	3	1.302	2	8.0	17.6	
3	"The Blind Auditions, Part 3"	March 12, 2017	Sunday 8:30 p.m.	1	1.836	1	11.3	22.0	
4	"The Blind Auditions, Part 4"	March 26, 2017	Sunday 8:30 p.m.						
5	"The Battles"	March 19, 2017	Sunday 8:30 p.m.						
6	"Semi-final"	April 2, 2017	Sunday 8:30 p.m.						
7	"Final"	April 9, 2017	Sunday 8:30 p.m.	1	1.416	2	8.0	18.5	
