= Laura Bretan =

Romanian-American soprano singer

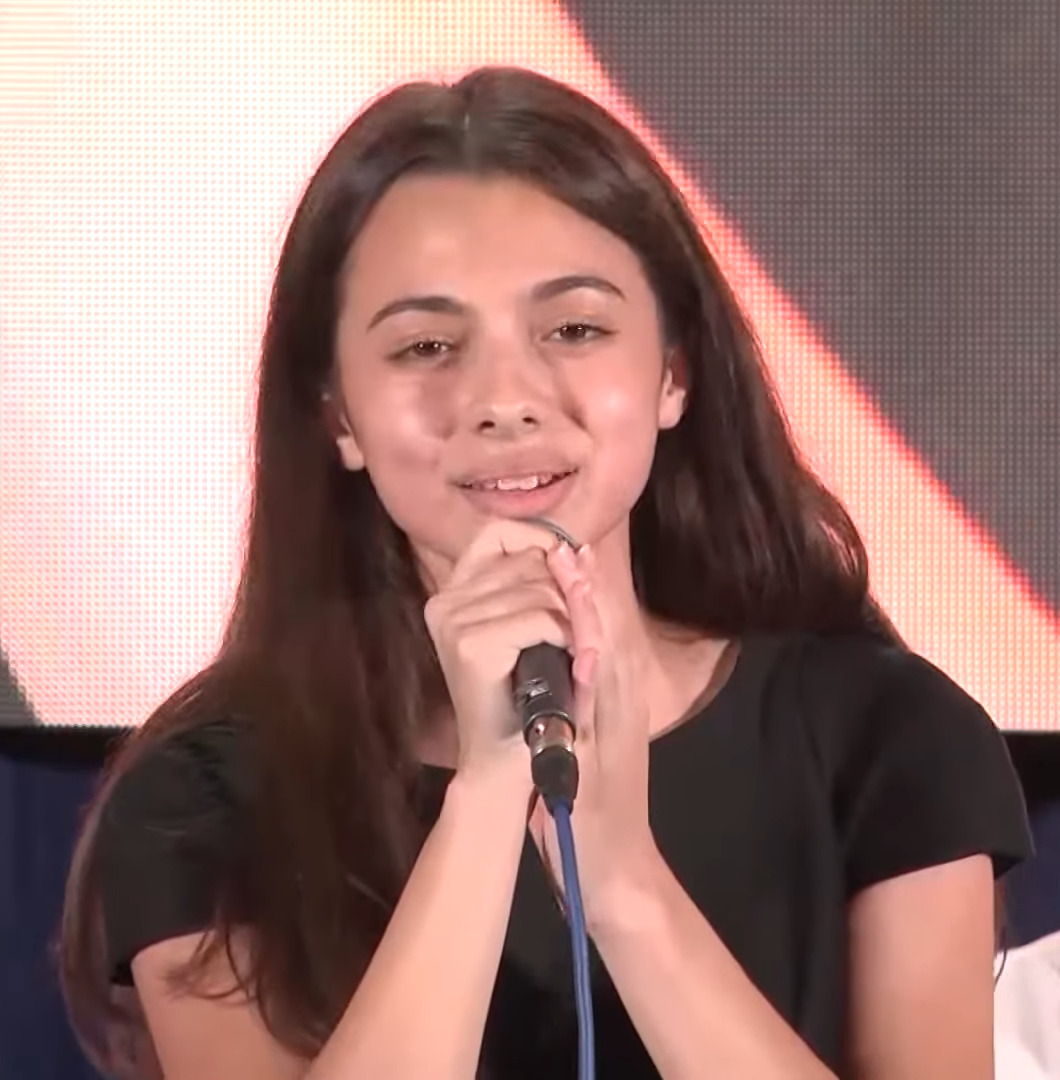
- Bretan performing in Bucharest in October 2019

Background information
- Born: April 7, 2002 (age 24); Chicago, Illinois, U.S.
- Origin: Romania
- Genres: Operatic pop; Christian; gospel
- Occupation: Singer
- Years active: 2016–present
- Website: laurabretan.com

Laura Bretan (born April 7, 2002) is a Romanian-American soprano. She was the winner of season 6 of the Pro TV series Romania's Got Talent and later placed sixth in season 11 of America's Got Talent, both in 2016.

== Early life ==
Bretan was born in Chicago to parents from Romania. She first began singing when she was six years old. Bretan was taught how to sing by her mother. At age eight, she began singing at Elim Romanian Pentecostal Church. Both she and her parents are active members of the Romanian Pentecostal Church of Chicago.

== Career ==
In 2016, Bretan was the winner of Romania's Got Talent. Following that win, Bretan auditioned for season 11 of America's Got Talent when she sang "Nessun dorma" from Giacomo Puccini's opera Turandot. The act received a standing ovation from Simon Cowell, Heidi Klum, Mel B, and Howie Mandel; afterwards Mel B pressed her golden buzzer, sending Bretan directly to the quarterfinals.

Bretan performed in the first live show on July 26, 2016, and advanced to the semifinals with the audience vote. She gave another well-received performance in the semifinals, but missed out on the audience vote later, and lost the "Dunkin Save" vote. However, Bretan won the judges' vote and passed on to the finals. Bretan performed "O mio babbino caro" in the finals, earning very favorable reviews from the show's judges. "Today you look like a princess, but tonight you rule the stage like a queen," said Klum. She finished in sixth place overall.

In 2017, Bretan performed "I Dreamed a Dream" in the finale of season 1 of The Voice Kids Romania. In December 2018, Bretan was announced as one of the semi-finalists for the 2019 edition of Selecția Națională, Romania's national selection for the Eurovision Song Contest 2019 in Tel Aviv, Israel. She performed her song "Dear Father", winning in the televote but finishing 3rd in the jury, being the runner up in the overall results.

== Personal life ==
Bretan holds dual citizenship from Romania and the United States. In October 2018, Bretan appeared in an advertisement calling on Romanians to support the 2018 Romanian constitutional referendum which would constitutionally ban same-sex marriage.
