= MediaPro Music =

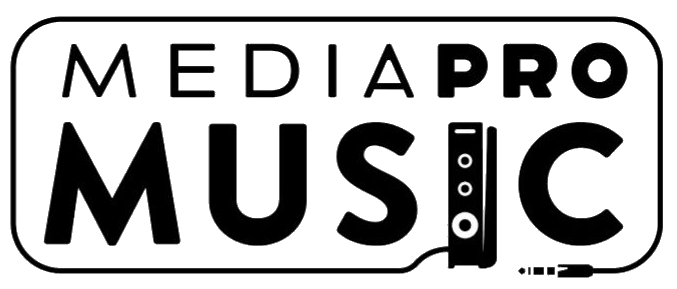
- Parent company: Universal Music Group (2015–present), Media PRO Group (former)
- Founded: 1997
- Genre: Various
- Country of origin: Romania
- Location: Bucharest
- Official website: mediapromusic.ro

MediaPro Music is a Romanian record label, part of the Universal Music Group. Launched in 1997, it became an integrated business of the Radio Company PRO in 2006. Between the main label and its sub-labels most music genres are covered, ranging from rock and pop, to dance, Latin, traditional folk, and children music. Moreover, the company is also involved in event planning (concerts, promotion tours, autograph sessions, press conferences) and publishing activities. In 2015, it was confirmed that American corporation Universal Music Group acquired MediaPro Music.

== Major artists ==
- Alessiah
- Anda Adam
- Andra
- Anya
- A.S.I.A
- Dan Bittman
- Cargo
- Nicole Cherry
- Loredana Groza
- Holograf
- Lora
- Maia Mălăncuș
- Matteo
- Sore Mihalache
- Marius Moga
- Dorian Popa
- Vunk
- Grasu XXL

== Other artists ==
- Low Deep T

== Former artists ==
- Alina Eremia
- Antonia Iacobescu
- Adrian Sînă
- Alexandra Stan
- AMI
- Corina
- Dan Bălan
- Lala Band
- Puya
