= Vocea României Junior season 2 =

Vocea României Junior
- Season 2
- Hosted by: Mihai Bobonete; Robert Tudor
- Judges: Andra; Inna; Marius Moga
- Winner: Maya Ciosa
- Winning coach: Andra

Release
- Original network: Pro TV
- Original release: June 8 – July 20, 2018

Season chronology
- ← Previous; Season 1

The second season of the Romanian reality talent show Vocea României Junior premiered on June 8, 2018 on Pro TV with Andra, Inna and Marius Moga as coaches.

== Coaches and presenters ==
Coaches

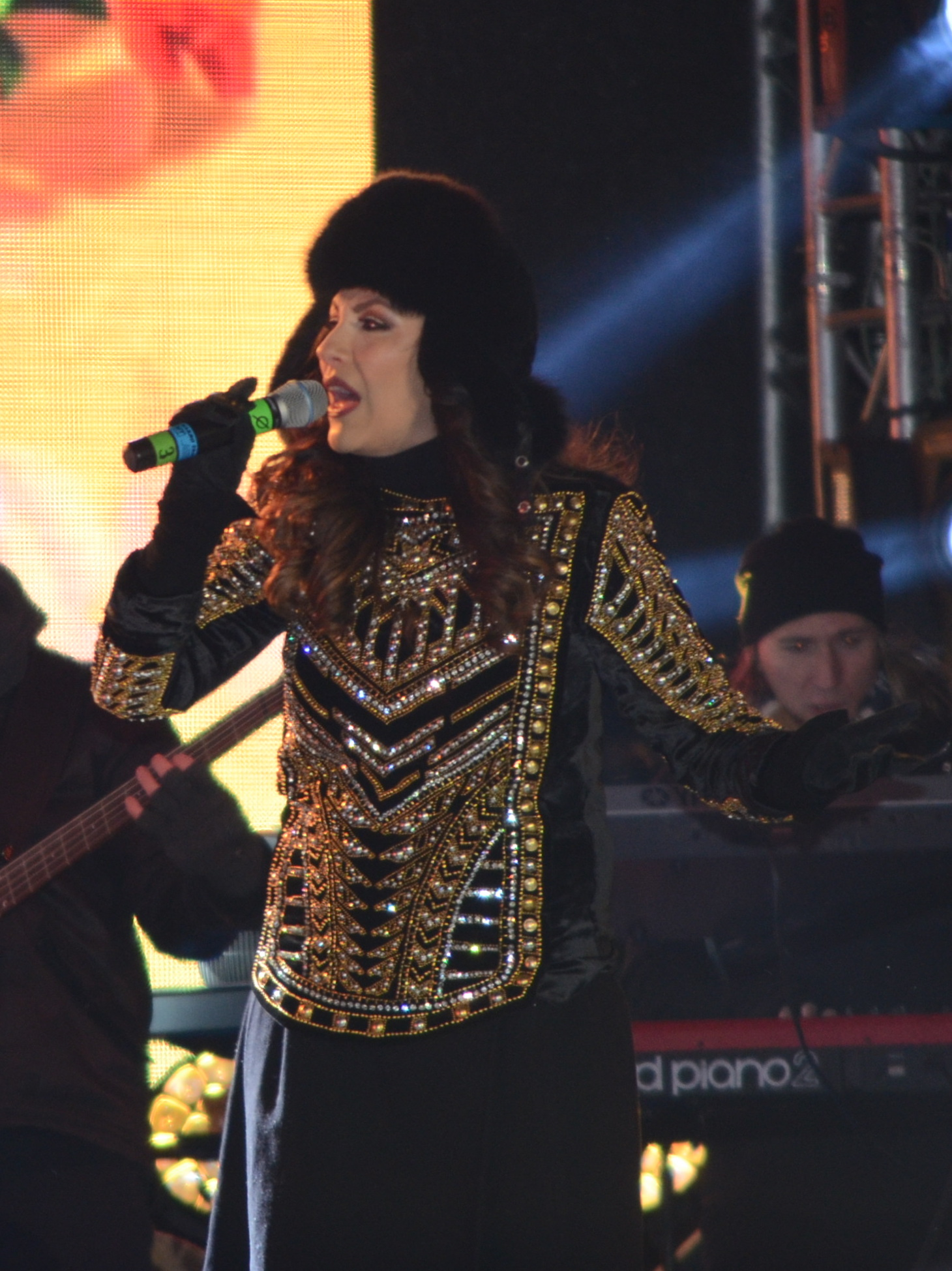
Andra

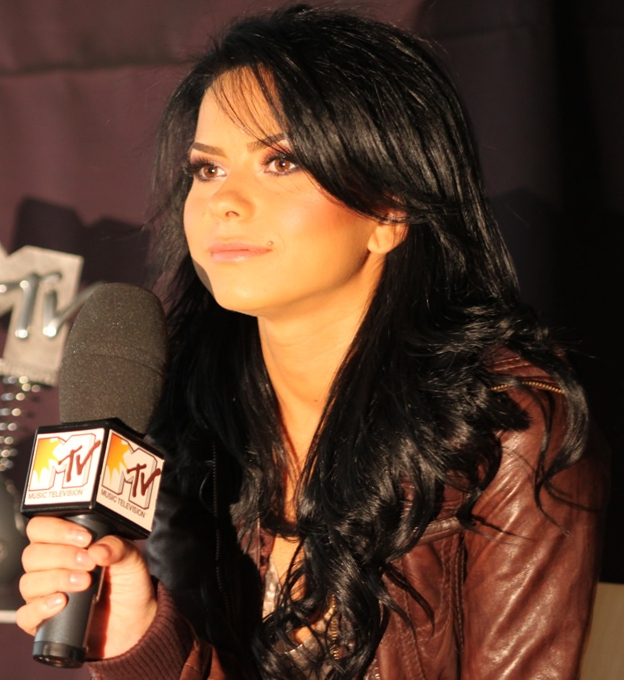
Inna

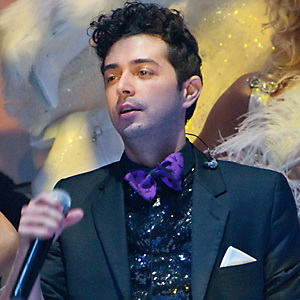
Marius Moga

=== Hosts ===
The hosts remained the same as in the previous season: Mihai Bobonete and Robert Tudor.

=== Coaches ===
The coaches remained the same as in the previous season: Andra, Marius Moga, Inna.

== Selection process ==
Cities where the pre-selections were held.

Pre-selections took place in the following cities:

Date	Audition venue	Location
May 20, 2017	Hotel Internațional	Iași
March 27, 2017	Hotel Golden Tulip Ana Dome	Cluj-Napoca
June 3, 2017	Hotel NH	Timișoara

== Teams ==
Colour key:

- Winner
- Runner-up
- Third Place
- Eliminated in the Semi-final
- Eliminated in the Battles

Coaches	Top 27 artists		
Andra			
Andra	Maya Ciosa	Ștefania Alexa	Ioana Neagu
Andra	Luana Prodea	Tudor Oancea	Ingrid Boengiu
Andra	Andreea Stoica	Emilena Istrate	David Ștefan
Marius Moga			
Marius Moga	Maria Popa	Arthur Horeanu	Mario Eduard Tudor
Marius Moga	Ștefania Hotca	Dan Ioan Bultoc	Mara Oancea
Marius Moga	Larisa Shahzada	Renata Jäger	Mădălina Turtureanu
Inna			
Inna	Olivia Alexandru	Rebeca Onete	Vlad Bilous
Inna	Daria Selaje	Andrei Șerban	Denair Bali
Inna	Andy Nicholas Neagu	Mudy Marei	Laura Arion

== Blind Auditions ==
Colour key

✔	Coach hit his/her "I WANT YOU" button
	Artist defaulted to this coach's team
	Artist elected to join this coach's team
	Artist eliminated with no coach pressing his or her "I WANT YOU" button

=== Episode 1 (June 8) ===
The first episode of The Blind Auditions aired on June 8, 2018.

Order	Artist	Age	Hometown	Song	Coach's and contestant's choices		
Order	Artist	Age	Hometown	Song	Andra	Moga	Inna
1	Arthur Horeanu	12	Arad	"Tainted Love"	✔	✔	✔
2	Ana Giulia Dancă	8	Roman	"Zig-Zagga"	—	—	—
3	Ingrid Boengiu	12	Bucharest	"Mad About You"	✔	✔	—
4	Larisa Shahzada	12	Bucharest	"Unconditionally"	✔	✔	✔
5	Daria Selaje	7	Petroșani	"Over the Rainbow"	—	—	✔
6	Andy Nicholas Neagu	9	Bârlad	"Come with Me Now"	—	—	✔
7	Ștefania Alexa	10	Bacău	"Oops!... I Did It Again"	✔	✔	—
8	Mario Niculescu	11	Târgu Jiu	"The Phantom of the Opera"	—	—	—
9	Carmen García del Valle	10	Málaga, Spain	"Uncover"	—	—	—
10	Andrei Șerban	12	Alba Iulia	"Great Balls of Fire"	—	—	✔

=== Episode 2 (June 15) ===
The second episode of The Blind Auditions aired on June 15, 2018.

Order	Artist	Age	Hometown	Song	Coach's and contestant's choices		
Order	Artist	Age	Hometown	Song	Andra	Moga	Inna
1	Ioana Neagu	12	Bucharest	"Gangsta"	✔	✔	✔
2	Amalia Guțu	8	Bălți, Moldova	"Oh! Darling"	—	—	—
3	Vlad Bilous	10	Topoloveni	"Amintire cu haiduci"	—	—	✔
4	Beatrice Iordăchescu	11	Bucharest	"Rise Up"	—	—	—
5	Lavinia Roxana Stroe	13	Ciochina	"Boulevard of Broken Dreams"	—	—	—
6	Mădălina Turtureanu	13	Chișcăreni, Moldova	"Girl on Fire"	—	✔	—
7	Stelian Șoldan	12	Bucharest	"Imagine"	—	—	—
8	Olivia Alexandru	12	Piatra Neamț	"Smells Like Teen Spirit"	—	—	✔
9	Luana Prodea	12	Sibiu	"Bird Set Free"	✔	—	—
10	Ilona Andreea Necula	10	Buzău	"Price Tag"	—	—	—
11	Ștefania Hotca	12	Satu Mare	"Million Reasons"	—	✔	✔
12	Tudor Oancea	13	Bucharest	"Say You Won't Let Go"	✔	—	✔

=== Episode 3 (June 22) ===
The third episode of The Blind Auditions aired on June 22, 2018.

Order	Artist	Age	Hometown	Song	Coach's and contestant's choices		
Order	Artist	Age	Hometown	Song	Andra	Moga	Inna
1	Rebeka Daniel	13	Cluj-Napoca	"Flashlight"	—	—	—
2	Denair Bali	11	Cluj-Napoca	"Whataya Want from Me"	—	—	✔
3	Emma Niculae	10	Bucharest	"Whole Lotta Love"	—	—	—
4	Mara Oancea	12	Suceava	"Toxic"	✔	✔	—
5	Maya Ciosa	13	Brașov	"Back to Black	✔	—	—
6	Maria Adăscăliți	9	Piatra Neamț	"Once Upon a December"	—	—	—
7	Dan Ioan Bultoc	13	Bucharest	"Stay with Me"	✔	✔	✔
8	Izabela Ciudin	12	Piatra Neamț	"Firework"	—	—	—
9	Andreea Stoica	11	Bucharest	"Memories"	✔	—	—
10	Stephen Ionuț Moisă	13	Piatra Neamț	"Shape of You"	—	—	—
11	Rebeca Onete	12	Bucharest	"Nobody's Perfect"	—	—	✔
12	Maria Nazaret	13	Bicaz	"At Last"	—	—	—
13	Mario Eduard Tudor	8	Bucharest	"De-ai fi tu salcie la mal"	—	✔	—

=== Episode 4 (June 29) ===
The fourth episode of The Blind Auditions aired on June 29, 2018.

Order	Artist	Age	Hometown	Song	Coach's and contestant's choices		
Order	Artist	Age	Hometown	Song	Andra	Moga	Inna
1	Renata Jäger	11	Târgoviște	"It's a Man's Man's Man's World"	✔	✔	✔
2	Denis Costea	11	Brașov	"Nobody but Me"	—	—	—
3	Andra Ghiță	10	Pitești	"Tu n-ai avut curaj"	—	—	—
4	Emilena Istrate	12	Craiova	"When We Were Young"	✔	✔	—
5	Ahmet Mudy Marei	12	Bucharest	"Sugar"	—	—	✔
6	Denisa Fulop	11	Acățari	"Rise Like a Phoenix"	—	—	—
7	David Ștefan	11	Bucharest	"In the Name of Love"	✔	—	—
8	Liza Gîlcă	10	Bucharest	"The Greatest"	—	—	—
9	Laura Arion	13	Chișinău, Moldova	"Neon Lights"	—	—	✔
10	Ilinca Dinu	11	Bucharest	"Zombie"	—	—	—
11	Paula Both	10	Ploiești	"Lost on You"	—	—	—
12	Maria Popa	13	Giurgiu	"Je suis malade"	—	✔	—

== Battles (July 6) ==
After the Blind auditions, each coach had 9 contestants for the Battles, which was broadcast on July 6, 2018. The coaches reduced their teams to one-third. Contestants who won their battles would advance to the Semifinals.

Colour key

Artist won the Battle and advanced to the Semi-final
Artist lost the Battle and was eliminated

Coach	Order	Winner	Song	Losers	
Marius Moga	1	Arthur Horeanu	"Bohemian Rhapsody"	Dan Ioan Bultoc	Ștefania Hotca
Andra	2	Ștefania Alexa	"We Don't Talk Anymore"	Tudor Oancea	Andreea Stoica
Inna	3	Rebeca Onete	"Where Is The Love?"	Andy Nicholas Neagu	Andrei Șerban
Marius Moga	4	Maria Popa	"Issues"	Mădălina Turtureanu	Mara Oancea
Andra	5	Ioana Neagu	"Chained To The Rhythm"	David Ștefan	Emilena Istrate
Inna	6	Vlad Bilous	"The Lazy Song"	Daria Selaje	Denair Bali
Marius Moga	7	Mario Eduard Tudor	"Crazy"	Renata Jäger	Larisa Shahzada
Andra	8	Maya Ciosa	"Side to Side"	Ingrid Boengiu	Luana Prodea
Inna	9	Olivia Alexandru	"Counting Stars"	Laura Arion	Mudy Marei

== Semi-final (July 13) ==
The semifinal was broadcast on July 13, 2018. The 9 remaining contestants in the three teams performed. From each team, the coach's choice artist would be qualified for the grand finals.

Coach	Order	Artist	Song	Result
Inna	1	Rebeca Onete	"Here"	Eliminated
Inna	2	Olivia Alexandru	"Show VMAs"	Advanced
Inna	3	Vlad Bilous	"Wonderwall"	Eliminated
Marius Moga	4	Maria Popa	"Greatest Love of All"	Advanced
Marius Moga	5	Arthur Horeanu	"Human"	Eliminated
Marius Moga	6	Mario Tudor	"Creep"	Eliminated
Andra	7	Ioana Neagu	"Jealous"	Eliminated
Andra	8	Ștefania Alexa	"Call Me Maybe"	Eliminated
Andra	9	Maya Ciosa	"Like I'm Gonna Lose You"	Advanced

== Final (July 20) ==
The final was broadcast on July 20, 2018. Each contestant performed three songs: one solo, one duet with their coaches, and one duet with a guest artist.

Coach	Artist	Order	Solo song	Order	Duet song (with coach)	Order	Duet song (with guest artist)	Result
Inna	Olivia Alexandru	1	"Royals"	8	"Tu și eu"	5	"Praf de stele" (with Adrian Despot)	Third Place
Marius Moga	Maria Popa	4	"Derniere Danse"	2	"Atat timp cat iubesti"	7	"Nobody's Perfect" (with Alina Eremia)	Runner-up
Andra	Maya Ciosa	6	"I'm Sorry"	9	Andra songs mashup	3	"Semne" (with Connect-R)	Winner

== Results per artist ==
Team's colour key
Team Andra
Team Moga
Team Inna
Result's colour key
Artist received the most public votes
Artist was eliminated
Runner-up
Artist received the least public votes

Results per artist
Contestant	Battles	Semifinal	Final
Maya Ciosa	Safe	Safe	Winner
Maria Popa	Safe	Safe	Runner-up
Olivia Alexandru	Safe	Safe	Third Place
Ștefania Alexa	Safe	Eliminated	Eliminated (Places 4–9)
Ioana Neagu	Safe	Eliminated	Eliminated (Places 4–9)
Arthur Horeanu	Safe	Eliminated	Eliminated (Places 4–9)
Mario Eduard Tudor	Safe	Eliminated	Eliminated (Places 4–9)
Rebeca Onete	Safe	Eliminated	Eliminated (Places 4–9)
Vlad Bilous	Safe	Eliminated	Eliminated (Places 4–9)
Laura Arion	Eliminated	Eliminated (Places 10–27)	
Denair Bali	Eliminated	Eliminated (Places 10–27)	
Ingrid Boengiu	Eliminated	Eliminated (Places 10–27)	
Dan Ioan Bultoc	Eliminated	Eliminated (Places 10–27)	
Ștefania Hotca	Eliminated	Eliminated (Places 10–27)	
Emilena Istrate	Eliminated	Eliminated (Places 10–27)	
Renata Jäger	Eliminated	Eliminated (Places 10–27)	
Mudy Marei	Eliminated	Eliminated (Places 10–27)	
Andy Neagu	Eliminated	Eliminated (Places 10–27)	
Mara Oancea	Eliminated	Eliminated (Places 10–27)	
Tudor Oancea	Eliminated	Eliminated (Places 10–27)	
Luana Prodea	Eliminated	Eliminated (Places 10–27)	
Daria Selaje	Eliminated	Eliminated (Places 10–27)	
Andrei Șerban	Eliminated	Eliminated (Places 10–27)	
Larisa Shahzada	Eliminated	Eliminated (Places 10–27)	
David Ștefan	Eliminated	Eliminated (Places 10–27)	
Andreea Stoica	Eliminated	Eliminated (Places 10–27)	
Mădălina Turtureanu	Eliminated	Eliminated (Places 10–27)	
