= Vocea României Junior =

- Also known as: Vocea Junior; Vocea Kids; Vocea Mică (all of them unofficially)
- Genre: Talent show Children's
- Created by: John de Mol
- Presented by: Mihai Bobonete; Robert Tudor
- Judges: Andra; Marius Moga; INNA
- Narrated by: Mihai Bobonete
- Country of origin: Romania
- Original language: Romanian
- No. of seasons: 2
- No. of episodes: 14

Production
- Executive producer: Dan Alexandrescu
- Producers: Ana Maria Modâlcă; Melanie Triebel
- Production locations: Kentauros Studios, Ștefăneștii de Jos

Original release
- Network: Pro TV
- Release: 26 February 2017 – 20 July 2018

Vocea României Junior is the Romanian version of The Voice Kids, created by John de Mol, who was the executive producer of Fear Factor and the creator of Star Academy, Vocea României Junior began airing on 26 February 2017 on Pro TV and Pro TV Chișinău. Based on the original version, The Voice of Holland, the concept of the series was to find new singing talent contested by aspiring singers with the age limit being 7–14 years old, drawn from public auditions. The winner, who was entitled to a €50,000 prize, was determined by public voting. The first season was won by Maia Mălăncuș, and the second season by Maya Ciosa.

The hosts of the series were Robert Tudor and Mihai Bobonete. The coaches of the series were INNA, Andra and Marius Moga. As of 2023, plans for a third season were not announced.

== History ==
In March 2014, ProTV announced their intention to turn season 4 into a children's competition, according to The Voice Kids' format, but they changed their minds a month later and decided to have a competition for people ages 16 and up, as in previous years.

In early 2016 it was announced that Pro TV had ordered The Voice Kids, a junior version of Vocea României.

== Format ==
One of the important premises of the show was the quality of the singing talent. Three coaches, themselves popular performing artists, trained the talents in their teams and occasionally performed with them. Talents were selected in blind auditions, where the coaches couldn't see, but only hear the auditioner. There were four phases to the competition:

- Stage 1: Blind Auditions
- Stage 2: Battle Rounds
- Stage 3: Semi-Final
- Stage 4: Live Final
Cities where the pre-selections were held.

=== Blind Auditions ===
Three judges/coaches, all famous musicians, chose teams of 9 contestants each through a four-episode-long blind audition process. Each judge had the length of the auditionee's performance to decide if they want that singer on their team; if two or more judges wanted the same singer then the singer got to choose which coach they wanted to work with.

=== Battle Rounds ===
In the "Battle Rounds," each coach grouped three of their team members to perform together, then chose one to advance in the competition.

=== Semi-final ===
In the Semi-final, three artists within a team sang individual performances in succession. At the conclusion of the performances, their coach then decided out of the three artists who won.

=== Live Final ===
The Final (the winner round) was decided upon by public vote.

== Hosts and coaches ==
=== Hosts ===
In July 2016 Mihai Bobonete and Robert Tudor were confirmed hosts for the Voice of Romania Junior.

=== Coaches ===
In June 2016 pop singer and judge at Românii au talent, Andra, singer, dancer and philanthropist, INNA, and R&B musician, composer and adult show coach, Marius Moga were confirmed coaches for the Voice of Romania Junior.

Coaches gallery

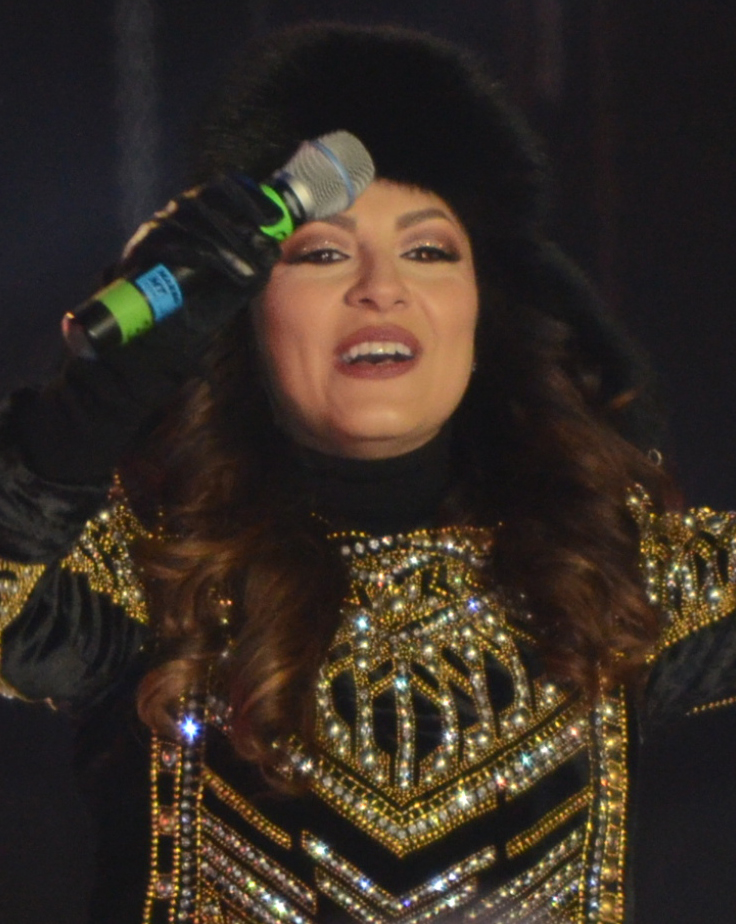
Andra

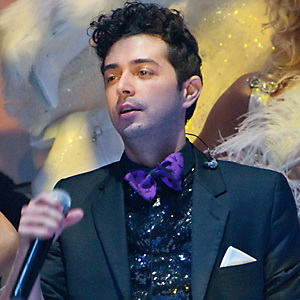
Marius Moga

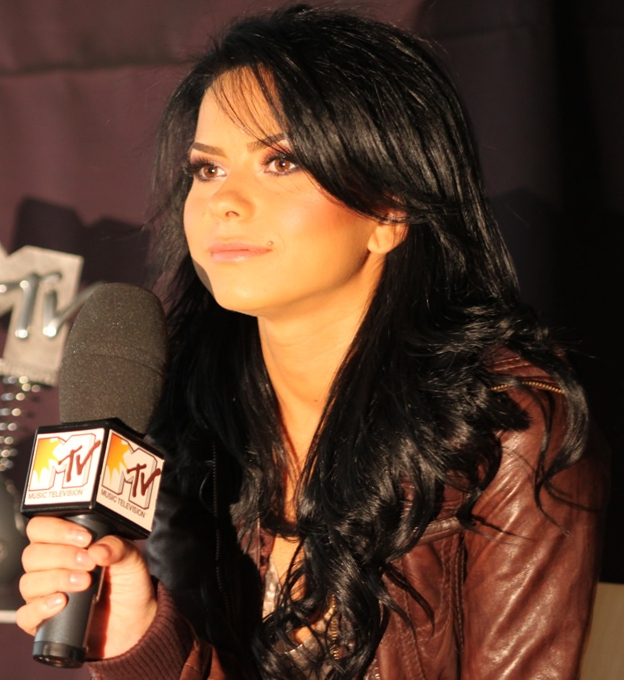
Inna

== Series overview ==
To date, one season has been broadcast as summarised below.

Team Andra
Team Moga
Team Inna

Season	First aired	Last aired	Winner	Other finalists		Winning coach	Presenters	Coaches (chairs' order)		
Season	First aired	Last aired	Winner	Other finalists		Winning coach	Presenters	1	2	3
1	26 Feb 2017	9 Apr 2017	Maia Mălăncuș	Andrei Ciurez	Karina Ștefan	Marius Moga	Mihai Bobonete, Robert Tudor	Andra	Moga	Inna
2	8 June 2018	20 July 2018	Maya Ciosa	Maria Popa	Olivia Alexandru	Andra	Mihai Bobonete, Robert Tudor	Andra	Moga	Inna

== Season synopses ==
Names in bold type indicate the winner of the season.

=== Season 1 ===
The first season of The Voice of Romania Junior premiered on February 26, 2017 and concluded on 9 April. The Judges were pop singer and judge at Românii au talent, Andra, singer, dancer and philanthropist, INNA and R'n'B musician, composer and former adult show coach, Marius Moga. Mihai Bobonete with Robert Tudor were the hosts. Contestant auditions were held in Cluj-Napoca, Timișoara, Iași, Brașov and Bucharest during March and April 2016.

Each coach was allowed to advance three contestants to the live shows:

**Team Andra**	**Team Moga**	**Team Inna**
Karina Ștefan	**Maia Mălăncuș**	Andrei Ciurez
Teodor Danci	Theodor Andrei	Voicu Dumitraș
Jessica Lăzărescu	Jennifer Dumitrașcu	Alexia Niculae

=== Season 2 ===
Season two premiered on June 8, 2018 and concluded on July 20, 2018. All coaches and hosts from last season returned.

Each coach was allowed to advance three contestants to the live shows:

**Team Andra**	**Team Moga**	**Team Inna**
**Maya Ciosa**	Maria Popa	Olivia Alexandru
Ștefania Alexa	Arthur Horeanu	Rebeca Onete
Ioana Neagu	Mario Eduard Tudor	Vlad Bilous

== Ratings ==
Season	Episodes	Season premiere	Season premiere viewing figures	Season finale	Season finale viewing figures
1	7	February 26, 2017	1.96	April 9, 2017	1.41
