= Vunk =

Romanian pop rock band

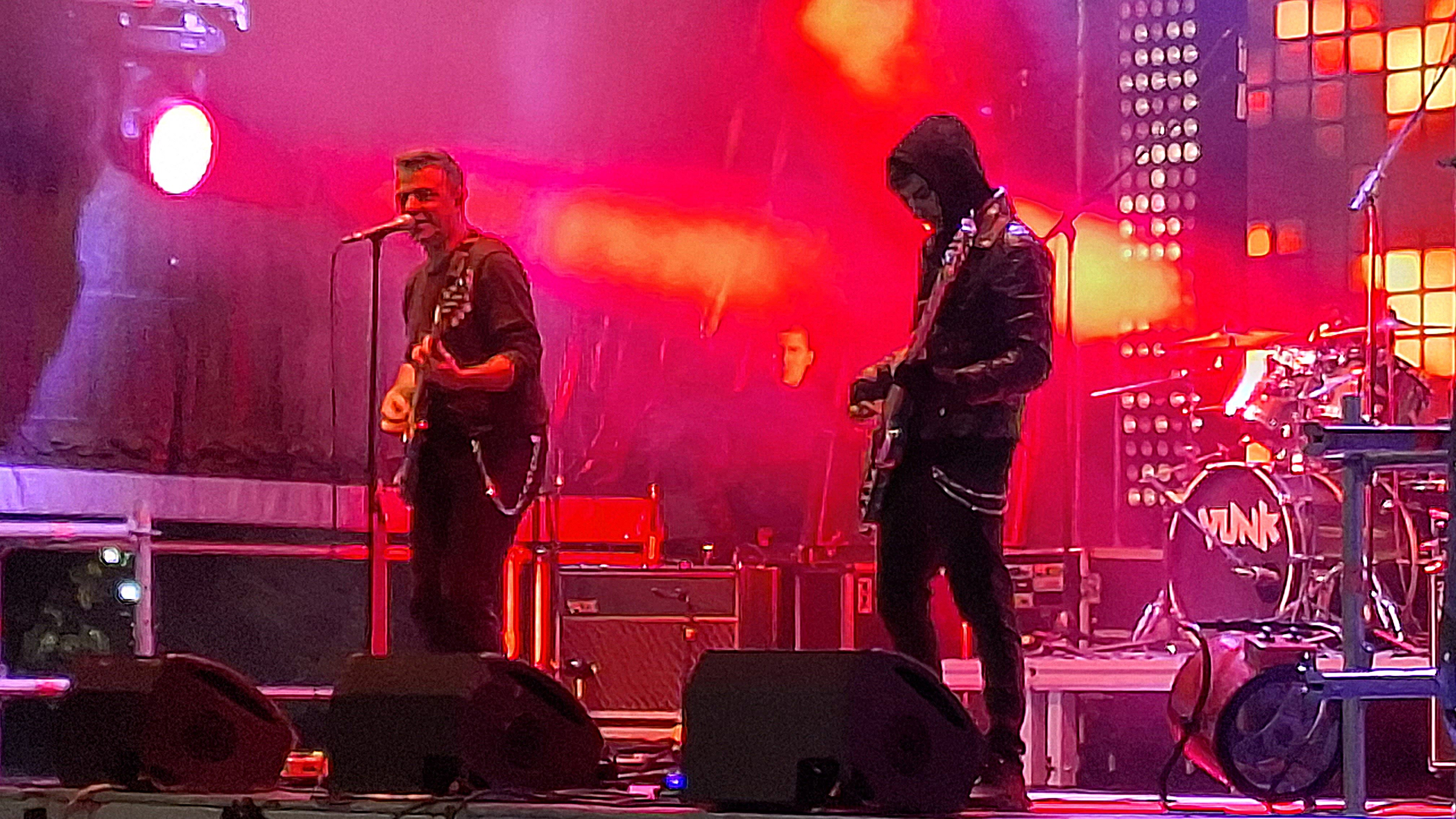
- Vunk in 2023, on stage at West Side Christmas Market (Bucharest)

Background information
- Origin: Bucharest, Romania
- Genres: Alternative rock; pop rock; pop; synth-pop; new wave; pop punk; punk rock (early)
- Years active: 1994–2008 (as Vank); 2009–present
- Label: MediaPro Music
- Members: Cornel Ilie (vocals, guitar, piano); Călin Grăjdan (guitar); Daniel Ionuț Onel (bass guitar); Vlad Gheorghe (drums)
- Past members: Bogdan Crucianu (bass): Nicu Sârghea (drums); Gabi Maga (guitar)
- Website: www.vunk.ro

Vunk (formerly Vank) is a Romanian pop rock band formed after guitarist Alex Belciu and bassist Victor Cenușă left Vank. The remaining Vank members, lead vocalist Cornel Ilie and drummer Nicu Sârghea, recruited guitarist Gabi Maga and bassist Bogdan Crucianu, the latter of whom would eventually be replaced with bassist Daniel Ionuț Onel and Călin Grăjdan.

== History ==
=== Vank (1994–2009) ===
In 1994, Vank had their first concert in Bucharest at the Ion Creangă theatre. In 1996, they built their first studio in the basement of the apartment building their parents lived in. In 1999, the four released the single "Independent", which shortly thereafter became Atomic TV's anthem. In November, they released their first album, "Voyeur", which contained 10 tracks. Not long after that, Vank entered mainstream Romanian radio and TV stations with the song "Noi O Scoatem La Capăt". The track became a smash hit. The band's second album, "6 Piese De 5 Stele", came out in 2001. The first song promoted from the album was "Regele soselelor".

A year later, Vunk launched another album, "In Haine Noi". It included both the song "All Too Young", which earned Vank second place in the 2002 national Eurovision competition, and "N-am Noroc" a remake of an Anda Calugareanu song. In 2004, Vank made a comeback with "Best of Vank", which featured all the band's past hits such as "1000", "Balada Pentru O Minune", "Langa Inima Mea Vine Inima Ta", "Iubire Cu Imprumut", and others. However, the most famous Vank song remains "Prajitura Cu Jeleu"; its lyrics became an anthem for high school boys.

=== Vunk (2009–2015) ===
For 14 years, the band's members - Alex Belciu, Victor Cenușă, Cornel Ilie, and Nicu Sârghea - performed under the name Vank. After ten years of activity and a four-year break, the band was reinvented under the name Vunk. In 2009, after Belciu and Cenușă quit, Bogdan Crucianu joined the band, followed by Gabi Maga in 2010. Today, Vunk includes Cornel Ilie, Nicu Sârghea, Gabi Maga, and Daniel Ionuț Onel. Their first single together was "La Orice Ora". The music video for this song created a new meme for the band: a broken clock, inscribed with the band's old name, that starts to work only after it receives a "letter transplant". Singles from the album include "Dau Alarma", "Prima Noapte", "Artificii Pe Tavan" and "Lacrimi De Coniac".

In February 2010, Vunk launched the album "Ca Pe Vremuri", and at the end of the year they joined the campaign "Vreau O Tara Ca Afara". The latter was a social campaign that aimed to inspire a change in peoples' behavior with the purpose of making Romania a country with a more Western culture and values. Less than two weeks after its launch, the campaign was awarded the "Premiul De Excelenta" prize. Since 2010, Vunk has been the official ambassador of the Romanian Autism Organization. After receiving the title of best pop-rock Romanian band in 2011, the group released the single "Pleaca", a collaboration with singer Antonia. The song was #1 on the charts for several weeks.

In November 2012, at Sala Polivalenta, the band had their biggest concert to date. Before a crowd of over 5,000 fans, they launch the album "Nimeni Nu Scapa (Fara Emotii)", which was then promoted in a tour of 12 Romanian cities. Their first show at Polivalenta brought to stage important guest singers such as: Andra, Smiley, Antonia, Eric Martin, Puya and Monica Anghel. For the first time on the Romanian scene, Vunk used bracelets with colored LEDs that lit simultaneously to create spectacular light effects. The idea of giving bracelets to the people present at the concert was also used by Coldplay.

In 2013, Vunk launched several music videos: "Asa Si", "Doi Somnambuli", and "Pierderea Lor", the last being part of the campaign "Campania Respectului", initiated by Avon, which fights against domestic violence. In October, Vunk had its second big concert at Sala Polivalenta, entitled "#asasishow". This concert was awarded the prize of Best Romanian Concert. In February 2014, Vunk, in collaboration with Andra, launched the music video for "Numai La Doi". That year, the band registered two firsts: an acoustic concert, on 10 May, held in the suspended gardens of Promenada Mall Bucharest and a symphonic concert, on 22 June, during the Bucharest Music Film Festival in George Enescu Plaza in Bucharest. In the latter concert, they were joined by the Royal Camerata and Bucharest Music Orchestra, conducted by bandmaster George Natsis.

== Band members ==
=== Current members ===
- Cornel Ilie – vocals, guitar, piano (2009–present)
- Daniel Ionuț Onel – bass guitar (2017–present)
- Călin Grăjdan – guitar (2024–present)
- Vlad Gheorghe - drums (2025-present)

=== Former members ===
- Bogdan Crucianu – bass, backing vocals (2009–2017)
- Gabi Maga – guitar, backing vocals (2010–2022)
- Nicu Sârghea - drums (2009-2024, died in 2024)

=== Former touring musicians ===
- Dan Incrosnatu – percussion (2014–2015)
- Răzvan Ilie – guitar (2014–2015)
- Dan Nicolau – trumpets (2014–2017)

== Discography ==
=== Studio albums ===
- Voyeur (1999)
- Independent (1999)
- 6 piese de 5 stele (2001)
- În haine noi (2002)
- Best of Vank (2004)
- Ca pe vremuri (2010)
- Nu scapă nimeni (fără emoții) (2012)
- Autoportrete (live acoustic on Promenada) (2015)
- Hituri și mituri (2015)
- Extrovertit (2017)
- Domnul Portocaliu Și Mașina Timpului (2019)
- De luni până duminică (2024)
- Suflet digital (2026)
