= Andra (singer) =

Romanian singer (born 1986)

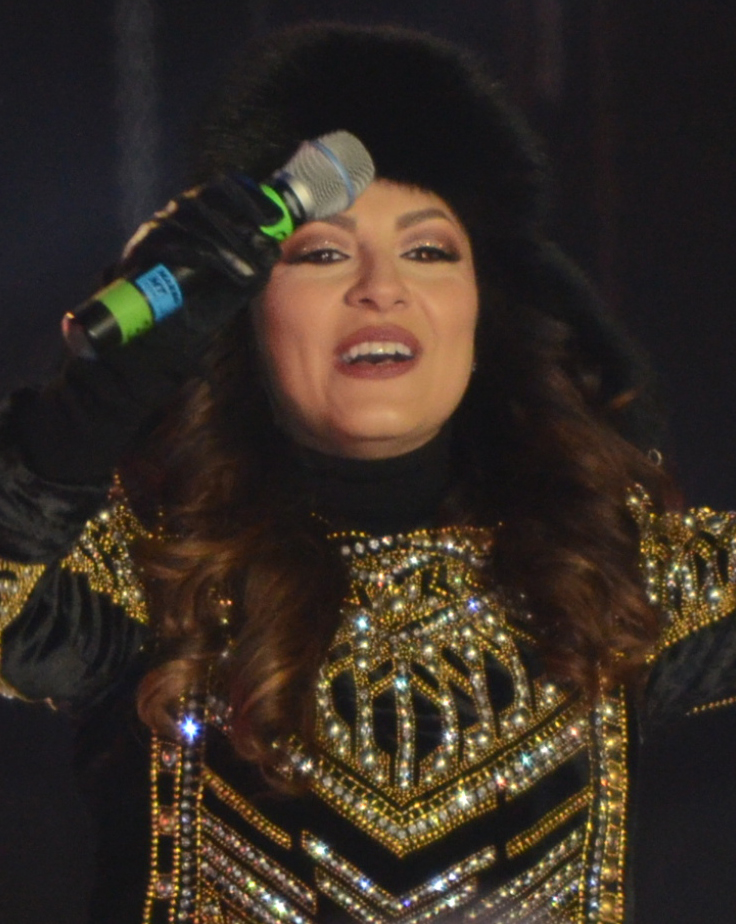
- Andra in December 2015
- Born: Alexandra Irina Mihai; 23 August 1986 (age 40); Câmpia Turzii, Romania
- Occupations: Singer; songwriter; television personality
- Years active: 2001–present
- Spouse: Cătălin Măruță (m. 2008)
- Children: 2
- Musical career
- Genres: Pop; dance-pop; R&B
- Instrument: Vocals
- Labels: Nova; Space; MediaPro
- Website: www.andramusic.ro

Alexandra Irina Măruță (née Mihai; born 23 August 1986), better known by her stage name Andra, is a Romanian singer, songwriter and television personality.

== Career ==
Andra began her career at the age of seven, where she had her first performance in TVR's musical competition Tip Top Minitop, singing "I Will Always Love You" by Whitney Houston. In 2001, at 14 years old, Andra released her first single, "În noapte mă trezesc" ("I Wake Up in the Night"). In both 2004 and 2007, she attempted to represent Romania at the Eurovision Song Contest with the songs "Just a Little Love" and "Dracula, My Love", respectively.

Since then, she has issued several hits, including the number ones "K la meteo" ("Like the Weather Forecast"; 2012), "Inevitabil va fi bine" ("It Will Inevitably Be Fine"; 2013), "Avioane de hârtie" ("Paper Airplanes"; 2015), "Niciodată să nu spui niciodată" ("Never Say Never"; 2015) and "Jumătatea mea mai bună" ("My Better Half"; 2021). Andra's 2007 album De la frate la soră (From Brother to Sister) with Mihai Săndel has notably been certified diamond in Romania for sales of 60,000 copies. In 2013, the singer was nominated for Best Romanian Act at the MTV Europe Music Awards, and went on to win the award in 2014 and in 2016. Andra's work on national television include presenting the shows Singuri cu vedeta (Alone with the Celebrity) on Antena 1 and O-la-la on Pro TV, as well as being a judge on Românii au talent and Vocea României.

The artist provided the Romanian voice of a goose in the animated movie Kung Fu Panda 3 and Smurfette in Smurfs: Lost Village.

== Discography ==
=== Albums ===
==== Studio albums ====
List of studio albums, with sales and certifications
Title	Album details	Certifications
Andra	Released: 17 June 2001; Label: Nova; Formats: CD	
Dragostea mea	Released: 21 June 2002; Label: Nova; Formats: CD, cassette	UPFR: Gold
Vreau sărutarea ta	Released: 30 February 2003; Label: Space; Formats: CD	UPFR: Gold
Rămâi cu mine	Released: 25 April 2005; Label: Space; Formats: CD	
Dragostea rămâne	Released: 10 February 2008; Label: MediaPro; Formats: CD, digital download	UPFR: Gold
Iubește-mă azi, iubește-mă mâine	Released: 18 June 2009; Label: MediaPro; Formats: CD, digital download	
Inevitabil va fi bine	Released: 20 June 2013; Label: MediaPro; Formats: CD, digital download	UPFR: Gold
Iubirea schimbă tot	Released: 3 March 2017; Label: MediaPro; Formats: CD, digital download	

==== Christmas albums ====
List of other albums, with sales and certifications
Title	Album details
Vis de iarnă	Released: 22 November 2007; Label: MediaPro; Formats: CD
La mulți ani și gândul bun! (with Cargo)	Released: 28 November 2008; Label: MediaPro; Formats: CD, digital download
Pregătește-te pentru sărbători!	Released: 30 November 2013; Label: Mango; Formats: CD
Christmas Magic	Released: 17 December 2021; Label: MediaPro; Formats: CD, digital download

==== Collaborative albums ====
List of other albums, with sales and certifications
Title	Album details	Certifications
De la frate la soră (with Mihai Săndel)	Released: 21 January 2007; Label: MediaPro; Formats: CD	UPFR: Diamond
Album de familie (with Mihai Săndel and Aurora Mihai)	Released: 18 July 2008; Label: MediaPro; Formats: CD, digital download	
O familie populară (with Mihai Săndel and Aurora Mihai)	Released: 10 January 2010; Label: MediaPro; Formats: CD, digital download	
Cutiuța muzicală 9 (with Monica Anghel and Oana Sârbu)	Released: 27 April 2011; Label: MediaPro; Formats: CD, digital download	

==== Live albums ====
List of other albums, with sales and certifications
Title	Album details
Vis de iarnă: Live in Concert	Released: 22 December 2022; Label: Self-release; Formats: Digital download

==== Compilation albums ====
List of compilation albums
Title	Album details
Best Of	Released: 2007; Label: Taifasuri; Formats: CD
Best Of – Vreau sărutarea ta	Released: 2009; Label: Taifasuri; Formats: CD

=== Singles ===
==== As lead artist ====
List of singles as lead artist, with selected chart positions
Title	Year	Peak chart positions			Album
Title	Year	ROM Air.	CIS Air.	MDA Air.	Album
"În noapte mă trezesc"	2001	—	—	—	Andra
"Eu aș da"	2002	—	—	—	Andra
"Aș vrea"	2002	—	—	—	Dragostea mea
"Un ocean de-ai fi"	2002	—	—	—	Dragostea mea
"Vreau sărutarea ta" (featuring Tiger 1)	2003	6	—	—	Vreau sărutarea ta
"E vina ta"	2004	82	—	—	Vreau sărutarea ta
"Doar o clipă"	2005	16	—	—	Rămâi cu mine
"Băieții şi fetele ce vor"	2005	8	—	—	Rămâi cu mine
"Rămâi cu mine"	2006	9	—	—	Rămâi cu mine
"We Go Crazy"	2007	69	—	—	Non-album single
"Dragostea rămâne"	2007	11	—	—	Dragostea rămâne
"Fierbinte" (featuring Alb Negru)	2008	(Note: The Romanian Top 100 was offline from June 2008 to June 2010, with no archives available. All updates this time are lost/unknown)	—	—	Dragostea rămâne
"Un lucru să-mi dai" (featuring Marius Moga)	2008	(Note: The Romanian Top 100 was offline from June 2008 to June 2010, with no archives available. All updates this time are lost/unknown)	—	—	Dragostea rămâne
"Femeia"	2009	(Note: The Romanian Top 100 was offline from June 2008 to June 2010, with no archives available. All updates this time are lost/unknown)	—	—	Iubeşte-mă azi, iubeşte-mă mâine
"Colț de suflet" (featuring Adi Cristescu)	2009	(Note: The Romanian Top 100 was offline from June 2008 to June 2010, with no archives available. All updates this time are lost/unknown)	—	—	Iubeşte-mă azi, iubeşte-mă mâine
"Abelia"	2010	18	—	—	Inevitabil va fi bine
"Something New"	2011	3	—	—	Inevitabil va fi bine
"Telephone"	2011	8	—	—	Inevitabil va fi bine
"What About Us"	2012	3	—	7	Inevitabil va fi bine
"Inevitabil va fi bine"	2013	1	—	3	Inevitabil va fi bine
"Atâta timp cât mă iubești" (featuring Marius Moga)	2013	2	—	—	Non-album singles
"Așa e dragostea" (featuring Liviu Teodorescu)	2014	9	—	—	Non-album singles
"Avioane de hârtie" (featuring Shift)	2015	1	—	—	Non-album singles
"Niciodată să nu spui niciodată" (featuring Cabron)	2015	1	—	—	Iubirea schimbă tot
"Iubirea schimbă tot"/ "Love Can Save It All"	2016	8	—	—	Iubirea schimbă tot
"Why"	2016	91	—	—	Non-album single
"Without You" (featuring David Bisbal)	2016	5	—	—	Iubirea schimbă tot
"La refren"	2017	83	—	—	Iubirea schimbă tot
"Floare de Nu-mă-uita" / "Forget Me Not" (featuring Dorian)	2017	21	—	—	Iubirea schimbă tot
"Mi-ai luat mințiile" (featuring Pacha Man)	2017	8	—	—	Non-album singles
"Sudamericana" (featuring Pachanga or Ahmed Chawki)	2018	13	—	—	Non-album singles
"Supereroi"	2019	20	—	—	Non-album singles
"Camarero" (with Descemer Bueo)	2019	20	—	—	Non-album singles
"Ține-te bine" (with What's Up)	2019	17	—	—	Non-album singles
"Vina mea"	2020	5	—	—	Non-album singles
"Brațe străine" (with Mario Fresh)	2020	2	—	—	Non-album singles
"Barcelona" (with Dony and Matteo)	2020	5	—	—	Non-album singles
"Jumătatea mea mai bună" (with 3 Sud Est)	2021	1	134	—	Non-album singles
"Timpul"	2021	36	—	—	Non-album singles
"Pas cu pas"	2022	9	230	—	Non-album singles
"Bine, bine"	2022	—	—	—	Non-album singles
"Doar Vina Ta" (featuring Smiley)	2022	1	—	—	Non-album singles
"Nu m-am gandit la despartire" (featuring Andrei Banuta)	2023	1	115	—	Non-album singles
"Nemuritori"	2023	—	—	—	Non-album singles
"Mă întorc acasă"	2024	1	–	—	Non-album singles
"De-ai fi în locul meu" (with Andrei Ursu)	2025	7	—	—	Non-album singles
"—" denotes releases that did not chart or were not released in that territory.

==== As featured artist ====
List of singles as featured artist, with selected chart positions
Title	Year	Peak chart positions		Album
Title	Year	ROM Air.	MDA Air.	Album
"Rollin'" (as part of Trupa Trupelor)	2011	—	—	Non-album single
"K la meteo" (What's Up featuring Andra)	2012	1	3	Inevitabil va fi bine
"Numai la doi" (Vunk featuring Andra)	2014	19	—	Nu scapă nimeni
"Aici cu mine" (Proconsul featuring Ștefan Bănică and Andra)	2015	—	—	Bun și simplu (Best Of, Vol. 2)
"Falava" (Naguale featuring Andra)	2015	8	—	Non-album single
"Butterfly" (Fly Project featuring Andra)	2016	35	—	Iubirea schimbă tot
"Între noi nu mai e nimic" (FreeStay featuring Andra)	2017	—	—	Iubirea schimbă tot
"Nu doar de ziua mea" (Voltaj featuring Andra)	2017	74	—	Ca la 20 de ani
"Semne" (Connect-R featuring Andra)	2018	12	—	Non-album singles
"Nos Fuimos Lejos" (Remix) (Descemer Bueno and Enrique Iglesias featuring El Micha and Andra)	2018	8	—	Non-album singles
"Doamna și vagabondul" (Cabron featuring Andra)	2019	—	—	Non-album singles
"Inima mea" (Pepe featuring Andra and Connect-R)	2020	—	—	Non-album singles
"Dorul" (Puya featuring Andra and Guz)	2020	40	—	Aventurile domnului Puy(a)
"—" denotes releases that did not chart or were not released in that territory.

==== Promotional singles ====
List of promotional singles
Title	Year	Album
"Sărutul nopților de Rai" (with Provincialii)	2005	Rămâi cu mine
"Vis de iarnă"	2007	Vis de iarnă
"Nebuni în noapte"	2015	Iubirea schimbă tot
"Din ceruri ninge alb"	2015	Non-album singles
"Sweet Dreams" (featuring Mara)	2016	Non-album singles
"Merry Christmas Everyone"	2016	Non-album singles
"Heaven and Nature Sing"	2016	Non-album singles
"Shukar"	2017	Iubirea schimbă tot
"Lie to Me"	2017	Iubirea schimbă tot
"Indiferența"	2018	Non-album singles
"Iubirea e un refren"	2019	Non-album singles
"Deschide ușa, creștine" (with Eva)	2019	Non-album singles
"Invisible" (featuring Lil Eddie)	2021	Non-album singles

=== Guest appearances ===
List of guest appearances
Title	Year	Album
"Prosopul" (Ștefan Bănică featuring Andra)	2005	Duete
"Moș Crăciun vine-n oraș"	2012	Cutiuța muzicală: cântecele de iarnă (by various artists)
"Crăciunul a venit"	2012	Cutiuța muzicală: cântecele de iarnă (by various artists)
"Lume, lume" (Damian & Brothers featuring Andra and Cabron)	2016	Gypsy Rock: Change or Die
"Cântecel de leagăn" (with Monica Anghel)	2021	Cântece de leagăn pentru adormit copii de grădiniță și bebeluși (by various artists)
