= Vocea României season 2 =

Vocea României
- Season 2
- Hosted by: Pavel Bartoș
- Coaches: Horia Brenciu; Loredana Groza; Smiley; Marius Moga
- Winner: Julie Mayaya
- Winning coach: Horia Brenciu
- Runner-up: Imre Vízi
- No. of episodes: 15

Release
- Original network: ProTV
- Original release: September 25 – December 26, 2012

Season chronology
- ← Previous; Season 1 Next → Season 3

The second season of the Romanian reality talent show Vocea României premiered on ProTV on September 25, 2012. It was hosted by Pavel Bartoș and Nicoleta Luciu, while Vlad Roșca was the social media correspondent. All four coaches returned for their second season.

The season expanded from the first season: each coach had fourteen artists on their team, rather than twelve as in the first season, resulting in 24 contestants qualifying for the live shows, as opposed to 20 the previous year. The blind auditions have also been extended from five to six episodes. The pre-selection phase was extended to more locations across Romania; they were held June 4 to June 29, 2012, in Bucharest, Iași, Constanța, Timișoara and Cluj-Napoca.

The season finale aired on December 26, 2012. Julie Mayaya, mentored by coach Horia Brenciu, was declared winner of the season. It was Brenciu's first victory as a coach.

== Pre-selections ==
Cities where the pre-selections were held.

Pre-selections took place in the following cities:

Location	Date	Venue
Bucharest	June 4, 2012	Ramada Bucharest Parc Hotel
Iași	June 18, 2012	Hotel Unirea
Constanța	June 21, 2012	Hotel Palace
Timișoara	June 26, 2012	Hotel Continental
Cluj-Napoca	June 29, 2012	Hotel Belvedere

== Teams ==
Color key

- Winner
- Runner-up
- Third place
- Fourth place
- Eliminated in the live shows
- Eliminated in the sing-off round
- Eliminated in the battle rounds

Coaches	Top 56 artists				
Horia Brenciu					
Horia Brenciu	Julie Mayaya	Laurian Manta	Vlad Simon	Dalma Kovács	Ioana Cristea
Horia Brenciu	Maria Cojocaru	Camelia Sterea	Mihai Grigoraș	Ovidiu Lazăr	Robert Nicolae
Horia Brenciu	Marius Bălan	Maria Alexievici	Izabela Simion	Diana Moșneagu	
Marius Moga					
Marius Moga	Imre Vízi	Fely Donose	Robert Reamzy	Cezar Dometi	David Bryan
Marius Moga	Maria-Mirabela Cismaru	Monica Odagiu	Monica Merișan	Oana Munteanu	Cristina Bondoc
Marius Moga	Claudiu Zamfira	Marcel Roșca	Mihai Toma	Dorin Ochenatu	
Loredana Groza					
Loredana Groza	Cristi Nistor	Ciprian Teodorescu	Ana-Maria Alexie	Teodor Manciulea	Nicoleta Gavriliță
Loredana Groza	Daria Corbu	Ricardo Caria	Răzvan Ștef	Teodora Secui	Daddy
Loredana Groza	Ștefan Gheorghiu	Alexandru Simion	Magdalena Cichirdan	Bernard Lazăr	
Smiley					
Smiley	Tibi Scobiola	Silviu Pașca	Loredana Ciobotaru	Andreea Olariu	Mihail Gheorghe
Smiley	Laura Gherescu	George Liliac	Cristina Caramarcu	Matei Sorescu	Dragoș Cristiu
Smiley	Elena Vasile	Eduard Buday	Camelia Marinescu	Jan Șelaru	

== Blind auditions ==
The first phase of the competition, the blind auditions, taped August 6–9, 2012 at the MediaPro Studios, Buftea, began airing when the season premiered on September 25, 2012.

Color key

✔	Coach hit his/her "I WANT YOU" button
	Artist defaulted to this coach's team
	Artist elected to join this coach's team
	Artist eliminated with no coach pressing his or her "I WANT YOU" button

=== Episode 1 (September 25) ===
The first of six pre-recorded audition episodes aired on Tuesday, September 25, 2012. The show started with the four coaches and the season 1 finalists singing "Moves like Jagger".

Order	Artist	Age	Hometown	Song	Coach's and contestant's choices			
Order	Artist	Age	Hometown	Song	Brenciu	Loredana	Smiley	Moga
1	Izabela Simion	19	Târgoviște, Dâmbovița	"Unfaithful"	✔	—	—	—
2	Matei Sorescu	25	Timișoara, Timiș	"I Try"	—	—	✔	—
3	Maria Cojocaru	21	Sibiu, Sibiu	"Mercedes Benz"	✔	✔	✔	✔
4	Raluca Drăgoi	26	Ploiești, Prahova	"Without You"	—	—	—	—
5	Maria-Mirabela Cismaru	17	Rovinari, Gorj	"Mercy"	✔	—	—	✔
6	Ștefan Gheorghiu	39	Bucharest	"What a Wonderful World"	—	✔	—	—
7	Dorin Ochenatu	27	Pitești, Argeș	"Lady Luck"	✔	—	—	✔
8	Alexandra Haidău	15	Iași, Iași	"Sway"	—	—	—	—
9	George Liliac	32	Onești, Bacău	"Adeline"	✔	—	✔	—
10	Ciprian Teodorescu	32	Iași, Iași	"Love Is All Around"	✔	✔	✔	✔
11	Robert Marius Anghel	34	Hunedoara, Hunedoara	"I Won't Give Up"	—	—	—	—
12	Daria Corbu	25	Pitești, Argeș	"Son of a Preacher Man"	—	✔	—	—
13	Maria Alexievici	20	Alba Iulia, Alba	"Breakeven"	✔	—	✔	✔

=== Episode 2 (October 2) ===
The second episode aired on October 2, 2012.

Order	Artist	Age	Hometown	Song	Coach's and contestant's choices			
Order	Artist	Age	Hometown	Song	Brenciu	Loredana	Smiley	Moga
1	Cristina Caramarcu	27	Bucharest	"Nobody's Perfect"	—	—	✔	—
2	Constantin Garbis	56	Medgidia, Constanța	"Ziua vrăjitoarelor"	—	—	—	—
3	Loredana Ciobotaru	22	Tulcea, Tulcea	"One"	✔	✔	✔	✔
4	Oana Muntean	23	Arad, Arad	"A Woman's Worth"	—	—	—	✔
5	Jan Șelaru	44	Moreni, Dâmbovița	"Aïcha"	—	—	✔	—
6	Cornelia Goda	33	Focșani, Vrancea	"O iubire imposibilă"	—	—	—	—
7	Mihai Grigoraș	28	Bacău, Bacău	"Gravity"	✔	—	—	—
8	Fely Donose	26	Sebeș, Alba	"Yoü and I"	✔	—	✔	✔
9	Bernard Lazăr	17	Iași, Iași	"Cât de frumoasă ești"	—	✔	—	—
10	Cătălin Rață	21	Galați, Galați	"Haven't Met You Yet"	—	—	—	—
11	Laurian Manta	16	Slănic, Prahova	"Je suis malade"	✔	✔	✔	✔
12	Crina Bălan	25	Mangalia, Constanța	"Listen to Your Heart"	—	—	—	—
13	Cristi Nistor	26	Luduș, Mureș	"She Will Be Loved"	✔	✔	—	—
14	Camelia Sterea	26	Constanța, Constanța	"I Have Nothing"	✔	—	—	—

=== Episode 3 (October 9) ===
The third episode aired on October 9, 2012.

Order	Artist	Age	Hometown	Song	Coach's and contestant's choices			
Order	Artist	Age	Hometown	Song	Brenciu	Loredana	Smiley	Moga
1	Ana-Maria Alexie	17	Dorohoi, Botoșani	"Rehab"	—	✔	—	—
2	David Bryan	27	Bucharest	"It Will Rain"	✔	✔	✔	✔
3	Dorin Marius Mateescu	26	Arad, Arad	"One Moment in Time"	—	—	—	—
4	Nicoleta Gavriliță	19	Chișinău, Moldova	"Yesterday"	—	✔	—	—
5	Alexandru Săndoiu	16	Bucharest	"Chasing Cars"	—	—	—	—
6	Daddy	24	Buzău, Buzău	"Ochii tăi"	—	✔	—	—
7	Georgiana Ene	33	Bucharest	"Je veux"	—	—	—	—
8	Cezar Dometi	22	Iași, Iași	"Make You Feel My Love"	✔	—	—	✔
9	Mihai Jipa	52	Ploiești, Parhova	"Can't Help Falling in Love"	—	—	—	—
10	Alina Știrbu	23	Bucharest	"La Vie en rose"	—	—	—	—
11	Robert Nicolae	24	Constanța, Constanța	"You Are So Beautiful"	✔	—	—	—
12	Andreea Olariu	16	Constanța, Constanța	"I Surrender"	✔	✔	✔	✔
13	Ioana Cristea	18	Târgoviște Dâmbovița	"You Lost Me"	✔	—	—	—
14	Laura Gherescu	25	Bucharest	"Upside Down"	—	—	✔	✔

=== Episode 4 (October 19) ===
The fourth episode aired on October 19, 2012.

Order	Artist	Age	Hometown	Song	Coach's and contestant's choices			
Order	Artist	Age	Hometown	Song	Brenciu	Loredana	Smiley	Moga
1	Ricardo Caria	33	Arad, Arad	"Bailamos"	—	✔	✔	—
2	Magdalena Cichirdan	27	Bucharest	"Over the Rainbow"	—	✔	—	—
3	Alina Giurgiu	35	Timișoara, Timiș	"Am nevoie de tine"	—	—	—	—
4	Julie Mayaya	26	Iași, Iași	"Hurt"	✔	✔	✔	✔
5	Oana Hristov	34	Brașov, Brașov	"Don't Know Why"	—	—	—	—
6	Teodora Secui	21	Constanța, Constanța	"A Woman's Worth"	—	✔	—	—
7	Monica Odagiu	16	Bucharest	"Piece of My Heart"	—	—	✔	✔
8	Călin Lupu	32	Timișoara, Timiș	"Supergirl"	—	—	—	—
9	Robert Reamzy	18	Bucharest	"I Just Can't Stop Loving You"	✔	✔	✔	✔
10	Cornel Macovei	50	Râmnicu Sărat, Buzău	"Copacul"	—	—	—	—
11	Eduard Buday	33	Petroșani, Hunedoara	"Have You Ever Seen the Rain?"	—	—	✔	—
12	Ovidiu Lazăr	18	Oradea, Bihor	"Cât de frumoasă ești"	✔	—	—	—
13	Silviu Pașca	27	Timișoara, Timiș	"The Seed (2.0)"	—	✔	✔	—

=== Episode 5 (October 23) ===
The fifth episode was aired on October 23, 2012.

Order	Artist	Age	Hometown	Song	Coach's and contestant's choices			
Order	Artist	Age	Hometown	Song	Brenciu	Loredana	Smiley	Moga
1	Răzvan Ștef	26	Arad, Arad	"Angels"	—	✔	—	—
2	Cristina Bondoc	25	Tulcea, Tulcea	"Because of You"	✔	✔	—	✔
3	Radu Ghencea	35	Bucharest	"Merit eu"	—	—	—	—
4	Diana Moșneagu	15	Vaslui, Vaslui	"Dragostea rămâne"	✔	—	—	—
5	Camelia Marinescu	32	Bucharest	"When I Fall in Love"	✔	—	✔	—
6	Claudiu Zamfira	20	Târgoviște, Dâmbovița	"Ochii tăi"	—	—	—	✔
7	Cristina Popoacă	33	Bucharest	"Speechless"	—	—	—	—
8	Teodor Manciulea	16	Buzău, Buzău	"How Am I Supposed to Live Without You"	✔	✔	—	✔
9	Nicolae Buda	45	Periam, Timiș	"Light My Fire"	—	—	—	—
10	Mihai Toma	27	Bucharest	"Great Balls of Fire"	—	✔	—	✔
11	Ella Dani	32	Craiova, Dolj	"Piece of My Heart"	—	—	—	—
12	Tibi Scobiola	39	Bucharest	"Ordinary People"	✔	✔	✔	✔
13	Vlad Alecu	23	Bucharest	"Balada (Tchê Tcherere Tchê Tchê)"	—	—	—	—
14	Marius Bălan	25	Pitești, Argeș	"Jesus to a Child"	✔	—	—	—

=== Episode 6 (October 30) ===
The sixth and last blind audition episode aired on October 30, 2012.

Order	Artist	Age	Hometown	Song	Coach's and contestant's choices			
Order	Artist	Age	Hometown	Song	Brenciu	Loredana	Smiley	Moga
1	Dalma Kovács	27	Brașov, Braşov	"A Night like This"	✔	✔	✔	✔
2	Mihail Gheorghe	26	Constanța, Constanța	"You Give Me Something"	✔	—	✔	—
3	Lucian Curelariu	28	Suceava, Suceava	"Iris"	—	—	—	—
4	Monica Merișan	23	Cernavodă, Constanța	"Iartă"	—	—	—	✔
5	Selatin Kiazim	16	Constanța, Constanța	"Not the Same Dreams Anymore"	—	—	—	—
6	Elena Vasile	37	Bucharest	"If I Were a Boy"	—	—	✔	—
7	Imre Vízi	26	Târgu Mureș, Mureș	"Roxanne"	✔	✔	✔	✔
8	Pavel Bartoș*	37	Bucharest	"Frumoasa mea"	✔	✔	✔	✔
9	Roxana Elena Apreutesei	31	Piatra Neamț, Neamț	"What a Wonderful World"	—	—	—	—
10	Dragoș Cristiu	24	Constanța, Constanța	"Yesterday"	—	—	✔	✔
11	Alexandru Albert Preda	23	Pucioasa, Dâmbovița	"Tears in Heaven"	—	—	—	—
12	Alexandru Simion	21	Constanța, Constanța	"Say You, Say Me"	—	✔	—	—
13	Vlad Simon	26	Sibiu, Sibiu	"Faith"	✔	—	—	✔
14	Marcel Roșca	22	Chișinău, Moldova	"Without You"	—	—	—	✔

* Host Pavel Bartoș auditioned as a joke. The coaches immediately recognized him and turned around, though, obviously, Bartoș did not join either of their teams.

== The battles ==
After the blind auditions, each coach had fourteen contestants for the battle rounds, taped October 15–17, 2012 at the MediaPro Studios, Buftea, and aired November 6–20, 2012. Coaches began narrowing down the playing field by training the contestants with the help of "trusted advisors". Each episode featured nine or ten battles consisting of pairings from within each team, and each battle concluding with the respective coach eliminating one of the two contestants.

The trusted advisors for these episodes are: Monica Anghel working with Horia Brenciu; Cristi Minculescu working with Loredana Groza; Șerban Cazan working with Smiley and Randi working with Marius Moga

Color key

Artist won the battle and advanced to the next round
Artist lost the battle and was eliminated

=== Episode 7 (6 November) ===
The seventh episode aired on November 6, 2012.

Coach	Order	Winner	Song	Loser
Loredana Groza	1	Teodor Manciulea	"Baby"	Bernard Lazăr
Smiley	2	Laura Gherescu	"7 Seconds"	Jan Șelaru
Marius Moga	3	Cezar Dometi	"Starlight"	Dorin Ochenatu
Horia Brenciu	4	Vlad Simon	"Wake Me Up Before You Go-Go"	Diana Moșneagu
Loredana Groza	5	Ciprian Teodorescu	"Have I Told You Lately"	Magdalena Cichirdan
Smiley	6	Andreea Olariu	"When You Believe"	Camelia Marinescu
Marius Moga	7	Imre Vízi	"I Wan'na Be like You (The Monkey Song)"	Mihai Toma
Horia Brenciu	8	Camelia Sterea	"My Number One"	Izabela Simion
Loredana Groza	9	Cristi Nistor	"Drops of Jupiter (Tell Me)"	Alexandru Simion

=== Episode 8 (13 November) ===
The eighth episode aired on November 13, 2012.

Coach	Order	Winner	Song	Loser
Horia Brenciu	1	Laurian Manta	"Pleacă"	Maria Alexievici
Smiley	2	George Liliac	"Dancing in the Street"	Eduard Buday
Marius Moga	3	David Bryan	"To the Moon and Back"	Marcel Roșca
Loredana Groza	4	Ana-Maria Alexie	"I Got You Babe"	Ștefan Gheorghiu
Horia Brenciu	5	Dalma Kovács	"Somebody That I Used to Know"	Marius Bălan
Loredana Groza	6	Ricardo Caria	"María"	Daddy
Smiley	7	Loredana Ciobotaru	"Cryin'"	Elena Vasile
Marius Moga	8	Maria-Mirabela Cismaru	"You're the One That I Want"	Claudiu Zamfira
Horia Brenciu	9	Ioana Cristea	"Beauty and the Beast"	Robert Nicolae
Smiley	10	Silviu Pașca	"Beggin'"	Dragoș Cristiu

=== Episode 9 (20 November) ===
The ninth episode aired on November 20, 2012.

Coach	Order	Winner	Song	Loser
Marius Moga	1	Fely Donose	"If I Ain't Got You"	Cristina Bondoc
Horia Brenciu	2	Julie Mayaya	"Black or White"	Ovidiu Lazăr
Smiley	3	Mihail Gheorghe	"Would I Lie to You?"	Matei Sorescu
Loredana Groza	4	Daria Corbu	"Call Me Maybe"	Teodora Secui
Marius Moga	5	Robert Reamzy	"Diamonds and Pearls"	Oana Muntean
Horia Brenciu	6	Maria Cojocaru	"You Shook Me All Night Long"	Mihai Grigoraș
Smiley	7	Tibi Scobiola	"Lucky"	Cristina Caramarcu
Loredana Groza	8	Nicoleta Gavriliță	"Don't Go Breaking My Heart"	Răzvan Ștef
Marius Moga	9	Monica Odagiu	"Can't Take My Eyes Off You"	Monica Merișan

== The sing-off ==
At the end of the battle rounds, each coach advanced five contestants from their team to the live shows, leaving the other two to duel for the sixth and last spot, in an extra round called "the sing-off" (cântecul decisiv). The contestants sang their blind audition songs again and the coaches chose one contestant each.

Color key:

Artist won the Sing off and advanced to the Live shows
Artist lost the Sing off and was eliminated

Coach	Order	Artist	Song	Result
Horia Brenciu	1	Camelia Sterea	"I Have Nothing"	Eliminated
Horia Brenciu	2	Laurian Manta	"Je suis malade"	Advanced
Smiley	3	George Liliac	"Adeline"	Eliminated
Smiley	4	Laura Gherescu	"Upside Down"	Advanced
Marius Moga	5	Monica Odagiu	"Piece of My Heart"	Eliminated
Marius Moga	6	Maria-Mirabela Cismaru	"Mercy"	Advanced
Loredana Groza	7	Ricardo Caria	"Bailamos"	Eliminated
Loredana Groza	8	Nicoleta Gavriliță	"Yesterday"	Advanced

== Live shows ==
Color key

Artist was saved by the public vote
Artist was chosen by their coach
Artist was eliminated

=== Live Playoffs (Week 1) ===
Three contestants from each team competed in each of the first two live shows, which aired on Tuesday, November 27 and Saturday, December 1, 2012, respectively. In either of the two shows, the public vote could save one contestant from each team, the second one being chosen by the coach. The third-placed contestant was eliminated. The sing-off concept remained a battles-only feature after the first season and disappeared from the live shows.

Episode 10 (November 27)
Coach	Order	Artist	Song	Result
Smiley	1	Loredana Ciobotaru	"The Way You Make Me Feel"	Smiley's choice
Smiley	2	Laura Gherescu	"Empire State of Mind"	Eliminated
Smiley	3	Silviu Pașca	"Lose Yourself" / "Dream On"	Public vote
Loredana Groza	4	Ciprian Teodorescu	"She's a Lady"	Public vote
Loredana Groza	5	Ana-Maria Alexie	"Man Down"	Loredana's choice
Loredana Groza	6	Daria Corbu	"Titanium"	Eliminated
Horia Brenciu	7	Maria Cojocaru	"Euphoria"	Eliminated
Horia Brenciu	8	Vlad Simon	"Come Together"	Public vote
Horia Brenciu	9	Dalma Kovács	"Hot n Cold"	Brenciu's choice
Marius Moga	10	Maria-Mirabela Cismaru	"What's Up?"	Eliminated
Marius Moga	11	Imre Vízi	"How Come, How Long"	Public vote
Marius Moga	12	Fely Donose	"Set Fire to the Rain"	Moga's choice

Non-competition performances
Order	Performer	Song
1	Horia Brenciu	"Fac ce-mi spune inima"
2	Marius Moga	"Tot mai sus"
3	Smiley	"Dead Man Walking"
4	Loredana Groza	"Apa"
5	Horia Brenciu, Loredana Groza, Smiley and Marius Moga	"Thank You for the Music"
6	Eagle-Eye Cherry	"Save Tonight"
7	Eagle-Eye Cherry	"Can't Get Enough"

Episode 11 (December 1)
Coach	Order	Artist	Song	Result
Horia Brenciu	1	Laurian Manta	"România"	Public vote
Horia Brenciu	2	Ioana Cristea	"Te iubeam"	Eliminated
Horia Brenciu	3	Julie Mayaya	"Ochii tăi"	Brenciu's choice
Loredana Groza	4	Teodor Manciulea	"O inimă de 16 ani"	Loredana's choice
Loredana Groza	5	Nicoleta Gavriliță	"Un actor grăbit"	Eliminated
Loredana Groza	6	Cristi Nistor	"Kalašnjikov" / "Gas Gas"	Public vote
Marius Moga	7	David Bryan	"Cerul"	Eliminated
Marius Moga	8	Robert Reamzy	"Sign Your Name"	Public vote
Marius Moga	9	Cezar Dometi	"De-ai fi tu salcie la mal"	Moga's choice
Smiley	10	Mihail Gheorghe	"Good Golly, Miss Molly"	Eliminated
Smiley	11	Tibi Scobiola	"Ană, zorile se varsă"	Public vote
Smiley	12	Andreea Olariu	"Show Me How You Burlesque"	Smiley's choice

Non-competition performances
Order	Performer	Song
1	Top 24 contestants	"Deșteaptă-te, române!"
12	Andra	Medley: "În noapte mă trezesc" "Dragostea rămâne" "K la meteo"
3	Horia Brenciu and Monica Anghel	"Sway"
4	Loredana Groza și Cristi Minculescu	"Strada ta"
5	Doina Spătaru	"De-ar fi să vii"
6	Top 24 contestants	"Gândește liber"

=== Quarterfinals (Week 2 & Week 3 - Part 1) ===
Team Brenciu and Team Smiley competed in the third live show, which aired on Tuesday, December 4. Team Loredana and Team Moga competed in the fourth live show, which aired on Tuesday, December 11. In each team, the winner of the public televote advanced to the next stage, while the 4th-placed contestant was eliminated. The coach got to save one of the remaining two contestants.

Episode 12 (December 4)
Coach	Order	Artist	Song	Result
Horia Brenciu	1	Dalma Kovács	"It's All Coming Back to Me Now"	Public elimination
Smiley	2	Silviu Pașca	"Jump"	Smiley's choice
Horia Brenciu	3	Laurian Manta	"Nothing's Gonna Change My Love for You"	Brenciu's choice
Smiley	4	Andreea Olariu	"Survivor"	Public elimination
Horia Brenciu	5	Julie Mayaya	"Something's Got a Hold on Me"	Public vote
Smiley	6	Tibi Scobiola	"Secrets"	Public vote
Horia Brenciu	7	Vlad Simon	"Smooth"	Brenciu's elimination
Smiley	8	Loredana Ciobotaru	"Russian Roulette"	Smiley's elimination

Non-competition performances
Order	Performer	Song
1	Marius Moga, Monica Odagiu, Marcel Roșca, Claudiu Zamfira	"Play That Funky Music"
2	Blue	"Sorry Seems to Be the Hardest Word"
3	Loredana Groza, Magdalena Cichirdan, Ștefan Gheorghiu, Alexandru Simion, Răzvan Ștef	"Friends Will Be Friends"
4	Blue	"Hurt Lovers"
5	Horia Brenciu, Dalma Kovács, Laurian Manta, Julie Mayaya, Vlad Simon	"All Night Long (All Night)"
6	Smiley, Loredana Ciobotaru, Andreea Olariu, Silviu Pașca, Tibi Scobiola	"Big Girls Don't Cry"

Episode 13 (December 11)
Coach	Order	Artist	Song	Result
Loredana Groza	1	Ciprian Teodorescu	"Have You Ever Really Loved a Woman?"	Public vote
Marius Moga	2	Robert Reamzy	"Earth Song"	Moga's elimination
Loredana Groza	3	Ana-Maria Alexie	"Just One of Those Things" / "Look at Me Now"	Loredana's elimination
Marius Moga	4	Cezar Dometi	"Still Loving You"	Public elimination
Loredana Groza	5	Teodor Manciulea	"I'll Be There"	Public elimination
Marius Moga	6	Imre Vízi	"Knockin' on Heaven's Door"	Moga's choice
Loredana Groza	7	Cristi Nistor	"It's My Life"	Loredana's choice
Marius Moga	8	Fely Donose	"Don't Let Go (Love)"	Public vote

Non-competition performances
Order	Performer	Song
1	Smiley, Eduard Buday, George Liliac, Matei Sorescu	"Wooly Bully"
2	t.A.T.u.	"All the Things She Said"
3	t.A.T.u.	"All About Us"
4	Marius Moga, Cezar Dometi, Fely Donose, Robert Reamzy, Imre Vízi	"Continuă"
5	Loredana Groza, Ana-Maria Alexie, Teodor Manciulea, Cristi Nistor, Ciprian Teodorescu	"The Best"
6	Horia Brenciu, Maria Alexievici, Mihai Grigoraș, Ovidiu Lazăr, Izabela Simion	"Get Outta My Dreams, Get into My Car"

=== Semi-final (Week 3 - Part 2) ===
All eight remaining contestants performed two songs each in the semi-final on Friday, December 14, 2012: a duet with one of their coach's season 1 contestants and a solo song. Within each team, the coach and the viewers each had a 50/50 say; the contestant with the highest combined score went on to the final.

Episode 14 (December 14)
Coach	Artist	Order	Duet Song	Order	Solo Song	Result
Smiley	Tibi Scobiola	1	"Don't Let the Sun Go Down on Me" (with Ștefan Stan)	13	"Living on My Own"	Advanced
Horia Brenciu	Laurian Manta	10	"The Prayer" (with Iuliana Pușchilă)	2	"Mamma Knows Best"	Eliminated
Loredana Groza	Ciprian Teodorescu	9	"Suspicious Minds" (with Iulian Canaf)	3	"We Are Young"	Eliminated
Marius Moga	Imre Vízi	4	"Hotel California" (with Oana Radu)	14	"Grace Kelly"	Advanced
Smiley	Silviu Pașca	5	"Written in the Stars" (with Cătălin Dobre)	12	"Mad World"	Eliminated
Horia Brenciu	Julie Mayaya	11	"Freedom! '90" (with Irina Tănase)	6	"(You Make Me Feel Like) A Natural Woman"	Advanced
Marius Moga	Fely Donose	15	"Total Eclipse of the Heart" (with Cristian Sanda)	7	"Diamonds"	Eliminated
Loredana Groza	Cristi Nistor	8	"Corazón espinado" (with Dragoș Chircu)	16	"The Lady in Red"	Advanced

Non-competition performances
Order	Performer	Song
1	Edi Stancu Dance Crew	"Don't Stop Me Now"
2	Jedward	"Waterline"
3	Jedward	"Lipstick"

Results
Coach	Finalist		Coach/televote percentages	Eliminated	
Smiley	Tibi Scobiola	110%	50% 50%	90%	Silviu Pașca
Smiley	Tibi Scobiola	110%	60% 40%	90%	Silviu Pașca
Horia Brenciu	Julie Mayaya	117%	50% 50%	83%	Laurian Manta
Horia Brenciu	Julie Mayaya	117%	67% 33%	83%	Laurian Manta
Loredana Groza	Cristi Nistor	132%	50% 50%	68%	Ciprian Teodorescu
Loredana Groza	Cristi Nistor	132%	82% 18%	68%	Ciprian Teodorescu
Marius Moga	Imre Vízi	114%	50% 50%	86%	Fely Donose
Marius Moga	Imre Vízi	114%	64% 36%	86%	Fely Donose

=== Final (Week 4) ===
The top 4 contestants performed in the grand final on Wednesday, December 26, 2012. This week, the four finalists performed a solo song, a duet with their coach and a duet with a celebrity. The public vote determined the winner, and that resulted in a victory for Julie Mayaya, Horia Brenciu's first victory as a coach.

Episode 15 (December 26)
Coach	Artist	Order	Solo song	Order	Duet song (with coach)	Order	Duet song (with celebrity)	Result
Marius Moga	Imre Vízi	12	"Somewhere over the Rainbow"	1	"Oficial îmi merge bine"	8	"No Woman, No Cry" (with David Bryan, Cezar Dometi, Fely Donose și Silviu Pașca)*	Runner-up
Smiley	Tibi Scobiola	5	"Back for Good"	10	"Baby, I Love Your Way"	2	"Endless Love" (with Antonia)	Fourth place
Horia Brenciu	Julie Mayaya	3	"Je t'aime"	9	"Cose della vita – Can't Stop Thinking of You"	6	Medley (with Andi Moisescu): "Vânzătoarea de plăceri" "Fetițele din București" "Suflet candriu de papugiu" "Sanie cu zurgălăi" "Strada speranței" "Morărița" "O lume minunată"	Winner
Loredana Groza	Cristi Nistor	7	"I Want to Know What Love Is"	11	"Ileană, Ileană"	4	"Eternal Flame" (with Inna)	Third place

* Imre Vízi and Pacha Man were supposed to sing "Același sânge", but the latter was unable to make it to the MediaPro Studios on time due to being stranded on an international airport on a very snowy day. As a result, Vízi and a few other contestants had an improvised performance instead.

Non-competition performances
Order	Performer	Song
1	Ana-Maria, Laurian, Imre Vízi, Loredana Ciobotaru, David, Nicoleta, Ioana, Julie, Daria, Fely, Teodor, Cristi, Laura, Silviu, Cezar, Mihail, Ciprian and Tibi	"Joyful, Joyful"
2	Dana International	"Diva"
3	Alice Francis	"St. James Ballroom"
4	Alice Francis and Ștefan Stan	"White Christmas"
5	Silviu, Imre Vízi, Ciprian, Ioana, Teodor, Julie, Daria, Loredana Ciobotaru, Fely, Laura, Ana-Maria, David, Cezar, Nicoleta, Laurian, Mihail, Cristi, Tibi	"Astăzi s-a născut Hristos"
6	Dana International	"Makat khom (Ey La Dir La Da Da)"
7	Julie Mayaya and Horia Brenciu	"Cose della vita – Can't Stop Thinking of You" (winning reprise)

== Elimination chart ==
Color key
Artist info

- Artist from Team Brenciu
- Artist from Team Loredana
- Artist from Team Smiley
- Artist from Team Moga

Result details

- Winner
- Runner-up
- Third place
- Fourth place
- Artist was saved by the public vote
- Artist was saved by their coach
- Artist was eliminated

=== Overall ===
#	Week 1		Week 2	Week 3		Final
#	Tuesday	Saturday	Week 2	Tuesday	Friday	Final
Julie Mayaya	—N/a	Safe	Safe	—N/a	Advanced (117 p.)	Winner
Imre Vízi	Safe	—N/a	—N/a	Safe	Advanced (114 p.)	Runner-up
Cristi Nistor	—N/a	Safe	—N/a	Safe	Advanced (132 p.)	3rd place
Tibi Scobiola	—N/a	Safe	Safe	—N/a	Advanced (110 p.)	4th place
Silviu Pașca	Safe	—N/a	Safe	—N/a	Eliminated (90 p.)	Eliminated (Week 3.2)
Fely Donose	Safe	—N/a	—N/a	Safe	Eliminated (86 p.)	Eliminated (Week 3.2)
Laurian Manta	—N/a	Safe	Safe	—N/a	Eliminated (83 p.)	Eliminated (Week 3.2)
Ciprian Teodorescu	Safe	—N/a	—N/a	Safe	Eliminated (68 p.)	Eliminated (Week 3.2)
Robert Reamzy	—N/a	Safe	—N/a	Eliminated	Eliminated (Week 3.1)	
Cezar Dometi	—N/a	Safe	—N/a	Eliminated	Eliminated (Week 3.1)	
Ana-Maria Alexie	Safe	—N/a	—N/a	Eliminated	Eliminated (Week 3.1)	
Teodor Manciulea	—N/a	Safe	—N/a	Eliminated	Eliminated (Week 3.1)	
Loredana Ciobotaru	Safe	—N/a	Eliminated	Eliminated (Week 2)		
Andreea Olariu	—N/a	Safe	Eliminated	Eliminated (Week 2)		
Vlad Simon	Safe	—N/a	Eliminated	Eliminated (Week 2)		
Dalma Kovács	Safe	—N/a	Eliminated	Eliminated (Week 2)		
Mihail Gheorghe	—N/a	Eliminated	Eliminated (Week 1.2)			
David Bryan	—N/a	Eliminated	Eliminated (Week 1.2)			
Nicoleta Gavriliță	—N/a	Eliminated	Eliminated (Week 1.2)			
Ioana Cristea	—N/a	Eliminated	Eliminated (Week 1.2)			
Maria-Mirabela Cismaru	Eliminated	Eliminated (Week 1.1)				
Maria Cojocaru	Eliminated	Eliminated (Week 1.1)				
Daria Corbu	Eliminated	Eliminated (Week 1.1)				
Laura Gherescu	Eliminated	Eliminated (Week 1.1)				
Reference(s)						

== Controversies ==
Andreea Olariu, a contestant eliminated in episode 12, and her mother, Lucia, accused ProTV of unfairly trying to eliminate her and ruin her public image. The two claimed that Smiley, Andreea's coach in the contest, deliberately picked songs that would put her in a bad light. Lucia Olariu also claimed that Andreea had not been given enough time to rehearse and that Julie Mayaya's victory had been staged.

== Ratings ==
Phase	#	Original airdate	National				Urban				Source
Phase	#	Original airdate	Rank	Average (000)	Rating (%)	Peak (000)	Rank	Average (000)	Rating (%)	Peak (000)	Source
Blind auditions	1	September 25, 2012	1	1,705	9.0	2,500+	1	1,096	10.4		
Blind auditions	2	October 2, 2012	1	1,938	10.2	2,846	1	1,136	10.8	1,592	
Blind auditions	3	October 9, 2012	1	2,061	10.8	2,871	1	1,313	12.5	1,811	
Blind auditions	4	October 19, 2012	1	2,038	10.7	2,500+	1	1,284	12.2		
Blind auditions	5	October 23, 2012	1	2,012	10.6	3,050	1	1,167	11.1	1,660	
Blind auditions	6	October 30, 2012	1	2,076	10.9	2,730	1	1,245	11.9	1,670	
Battles	7	November 6, 2012	1	1,899	10.0	2,400+	1	1,184	11.3		
Battles	8	November 13, 2012	1	1,878	9.9	2,400+	1	1,180	11.2		
Battles	9	November 20, 2012	1	1,526	8.0		1	985	9.4		
Live shows	10	November 27, 2012	1	1,471	7.7		1	909	8.7		
Live shows	11	December 1, 2012	1	1,607	8.4	2,500+	1	976	9.3		
Live shows	12	December 4, 2012	1			2,400+	1	945	9.0		
Live shows	13	December 11, 2012	2	1,215	6.4		2	751	7.2		
Semi-final	14	December 14, 2012	1	1,241	6.5		1	845	8.1		
Final	15	December 26, 2012	1	1,825	9.6		1	1,239	11.8		
