= Vocea României season 14 =

Season of television series Vocea României

Vocea României
- Season 14
- Hosted by: Pavel Bartoș
- Coaches: Tudor Chirilă; Smiley; Irina Rimes; Horia Brenciu & Theo Rose
- No. of episodes: 10

Release
- Original network: ProTV
- Original release: September 4, 2026

Season chronology
- ← Previous; Vocea României (season 13)

The fourteenth season of the Romanian reality talent show Vocea României premiered on ProTV on September 4, 2026, and is also streamed on Voyo. Tudor Chirilă, Smiley, Irina Rimes and the double-coached team of Horia Brenciu and Theo Rose all returned as coaches, while Pavel Bartoș returned for his fourteenth season as host.

In addition to the existing Mute and Block buttons, coaches received a new "Second Chance" button (Note: A similar feature, the "Coach Replay", was introduced in the American version in season 26.) for the blind auditions, which allows a coach to reverse a decision not to turn their chair and save the artist on the spot. The host, Pavel Bartoș, was also given a new feature called "Vocea lui Pavel" ("Pavel's Voice"), (Note: A similar feature, the "Carson Callback", was introduced in the American version in season 28.) which he could use once during the blind auditions to give an artist who failed to turn any chair another opportunity to audition later in the same season.

Irina Rimes announced at the start of the season that it would be her last as a coach on the show. The previous season was won by Alessia Pop, mentored by Tudor Chirilă.

== Pre-selections ==
Cities where the pre-selections were held.

Pre-selections were held in the following locations:

| Date | Pre-selection venue | Location |
|---|---|---|
| March 15, 2026 | Hotel Golden Tulip Ana Dome | Cluj-Napoca |
| March 22, 2026 | Hotel Ibis Timișoara City Center | Timișoara |
| March 29, 2026 | Hotel Unirea | Iași |
| April 18–19, 2026 | Hotel Sheraton | Bucharest |

== Teams ==
Color key

- Winner
- Runner-up
- Third place
- Fourth place
- Eliminated in the Live Shows
- Eliminated in the Knockout rounds
- Stolen in the Battle rounds
- Eliminated in the Battle rounds
- Eliminated after the Auditions

Coaches' teams
| Coach | Top 80 Artists | | | | |
|---|---|---|---|---|---|
| Tudor Chirilă | | | | | |
| Tudor Chirilă | Francoise Manuel | Bogdan Mișcoci | Elisa Petre | Rebecca Zaharia | Robert Iosifescu |
| Tudor Chirilă | Pantaleo Tritto | Dominique Simionescu | Giulia Haidău | Alexandru Stoica | ~~Timea Csaszar~~ |
| Tudor Chirilă | ~~Alessia Anghel~~ | Daria Bostan | Rebecca Oatu | Eduard Cotoară | Bianca Dan |
| Tudor Chirilă | Nicoleta Plămădeală | Otilia Teletin | Radu Săndulescu | Diana Rahmatova | Adela Smuliac |
| Tudor Chirilă | Larisa Oneț | | | | |
| Smiley | | | | | |
| Smiley | Youssef Zaki | Marius Georgescu | Cătălina Mihai | Rareș Ioan | Ștefan Munteanu |
| Smiley | Elisa Popovici | Alexandru Slăvescu | Briana Văduvă | Timea Csaszar | ~~Daria Peltea~~ |
| Smiley | ~~Andra Ghiță~~ | ~~Alexandru Stoica~~ | Simina Colopelnic | Dafina Bușu | Lavinia Pisăliță |
| Smiley | Ioana State | Valer Andronesi | Gabriela Negrilă | Rose Marie Lanciu | Edward Munteanu |
| Smiley | Dragoș Anghel | Lucas Urdea | Victoria Bădănău | | |
| Irina Rimes | | | | | |
| Irina Rimes | Lizuca Bîgu | Georgiana Munteanu | Maya Giotea | Raluca Oaida | Bogdan Selagea |
| Irina Rimes | Bogdan Savin | Mina Blue | Alexandra Bordei & Cristina Boghici | Andra Ghiță | Horia Neșcu |
| Irina Rimes | Andreea Dincă | Corina Sucarov | Alina Nădrag | YXNG | Hayley Crosbie |
| Irina Rimes | Maria Jugănaru | George Synzheriak | Ana Maria Marin | Darius Moisa | Ștefania Gurscaia |
| Irina Rimes | Samira Paraschivescu | Marilu Colica | Anastasia Boroată | Artem Liska | Laurian Manta |
| Theo Rose & Horia Brenciu | | | | | |
| Theo Rose & Horia Brenciu | Mihai Teacă | Teodora Sava | Gabriela Amza | Claudia Bouleanu | Tudor Gavrilă |
| Theo Rose & Horia Brenciu | Luca Mastacan | Ion Donciu | Daria Peltea | Alessia Anghel | ~~Alexandra Bordei & Cristina Boghici~~ |
| Theo Rose & Horia Brenciu | ~~Briana Văduvă~~ | ~~Giulia Haidău~~ | Dragoș Udilă | Daria Cucu | Iulia Petrea |
| Theo Rose & Horia Brenciu | Titus Pop | Cristiana Damian | Miruna Nacu | Armis Neagu | |
Note: Italicized names are artists stolen from another team during the battles (names struck through within former teams). Bold names are recipients of the "Second Chance" button.

== Blind auditions ==
Blind auditions color key
| ✔ | Coach pressed their "I WANT YOU" button |
| | Artist defaulted to this coach's team |
| | Artist selected to join this coach's team |
| | Artist received the "Pavel's Voice" card and was able to audition again later on |
| | Artist was eliminated with no coach pressing their button |
| | Artist was originally eliminated with no coach pressing their button, but was saved by the "Second Chance" |
| | Artist joined the team but was eliminated before the Battles |
| ✘ | Coach pressed their "I WANT YOU" button, but was blocked by another coach from getting the artist |
| | Blocked by Tudor; Blocked by Smiley; Blocked by Irina; Blocked by Theo & Horia |

=== Episode 1 (September 4) ===
First blind auditions results
| Order | Artist | Age(s) | Hometown | Song | Coach's and artist's choices | | | |
| Order | Artist | Age(s) | Hometown | Song | Tudor | Smiley | Irina | Theo & Horia |
|---|---|---|---|---|---|---|---|---|
| 1 | Mihai Teacă | 26 | Făgăraș, Brașov | "Mă dusei să trec la Olt" | ✔ | ✔ | ✔ | ✔ |
| 2 | Dafina Bușu | 27 | Oradea, Bihor | "Bad" | – | ✔ | ✔ | – |
| 3 | Iulia Petrea | 20 | Bacău, Bacău | "Kibori" | ✔ | ✔ | ✔ | ✔ |
| 4 | George Synzheriak | 18 | Cluj-Napoca, Cluj | "Minnie the Moocher" | – | ✔ | ✔ | – |
| 5 | Francoise Manuel | 41 | Chișinău, Moldova | "It's a Man's Man's World" | ✔ | ✔ | ✘ | ✔ |
| 6 | Larisa Oneț | 20 | Oradea, Bihor | "Bella Ciao" | – | – (Note: Smiley also used his "Second Chance" button for Larisa, but as she chose Tudor's team, he was allowed to use it again later in the season.) | – | – |
| 7 | Rareș Ioan | 21 | Bucharest | "Make It Rain" | ✔ | ✔ | ✔ | ✔ |
| 8 | Alessia Anghel | 16 | Ștefăneștii de Jos, Ilfov | "Raggamuffin" | ✔ | ✔ | – | ✔ |
| 9 | Teodor Voican | 21 | Bucharest | "V.S.T." | – | – | – | – |
| 10 | Georgiana Munteanu | – | Bucharest | "Savage Daughter" | – | ✔ | ✔ | – |
| 11 | Alexandra Bordei & Cristina Boghici | 37–45 | Galați, Galați | "Best Part" | ✔ | ✔ | ✔ | ✔ |

=== Episode 2 (September 11) ===
Second blind auditions results
| Order | Artist | Age(s) | Hometown | Song | Coach's and artist's choices | | | |
| Order | Artist | Age(s) | Hometown | Song | Tudor | Smiley | Irina | Theo & Horia |
|---|---|---|---|---|---|---|---|---|
| 1 | Ion Donciu | 21 | Moldova | "Spider-Man" | ✔ | ✔ | ✔ | ✔ |
| 2 | Corina Sucarov | 35 | Bucharest | "Prieten drag" | – | ✔ | ✔ | – |
| 3 | Camelia Trifoi | 28 | Sighetu Marmației, Maramureș | "Virtual Insanity" | – | – | – | – |
| 4 | Marius Georgescu | 50 | Lupeni, Hunedoara | "Whole Lotta Love" | – | ✔ | ✔ | – |
| 5 | Adela Smuliac | 37 | Sighetu Marmației, Maramureș | "Pe peronu' de la gară" | ✔ | – | – | – |
| 6 | Andreea Dincă | 23 | Bucharest | "Piece of My Heart" | ✔ | ✔ | ✔ | ✔ |
| 7 | Gabriel Munteanu | 23 | – | "Bruises" | – | – | – | – |
| 8 | Ioana State | 35 | Dascălu, Ilfov | "Șaraiman" | – | ✔ | – | ✔ |
| 9 | Timea Csaszar | 19 | Moșnița Nouă, Timiș | "The Code" | ✔ | – | ✔ | ✔ |
| 10 | Lorand Burjan | 41 | Timișoara, Timiș | "Mustang Sally" | – | – | – | – |
| 11 | Luca Mastacan | 17 | Bârlad, Vaslui | "Cine iubește și lasă" | ✔ | ✔ | ✔ | ✔ |

=== Episode 3 (September 18) ===
Third blind auditions results
| Order | Artist | Age(s) | Hometown | Song | Coach's and artist's choices | | | |
| Order | Artist | Age(s) | Hometown | Song | Tudor | Smiley | Irina | Theo & Horia |
|---|---|---|---|---|---|---|---|---|
| 1 | Bogdan Mișcoci | 44 | Craiova, Dolj | "Cry to Me" | ✔ | – | ✔ | ✔ |
| 2 | Patricia Thomits | 24 | Sibiu, Sibiu | "Fell in Love with an Alien" | – | – | – | – |
| 3 | Alina Nădrag | 23 | Slobozia, Ialomița | "Where Is My Husband!" | – | ✔ | ✔ | – |
| 4 | Lavinia Pisăliță | 31 | Câmpina, Prahova | "Nobody's Fault but Mine" | – | – | – | – |
| 5 | Tudor Gavrilă | 20 | Bucharest | "Gethsemane (I Only Want to Say)" | ✘ | ✔ | ✔ | ✔ |
| 6 | Ana Maria Marin | 26 | Cluj-Napoca, Cluj | "Am iubit și-am să iubesc" | – | – | ✔ | – |
| 7 | Valer Andronesi | 28 | Cluj-Napoca, Cluj | "Cea mai frumoasă zi" | – | ✔ | – | ✔ |
| 8 | Teodora Sava | 24 | Piatra Neamț, Neamț | "The Greatest" | ✔ | ✔ | ✔ | ✔ |
| 9 | YXNG | – | – | "Adidașii" | – | ✔ | ✔ | ✔ |
| 10 | Bianca Tacea | 22 | Brașov, Brașov | "Mi-am pus busuioc în păr" | – | – | – | – |
| 11 | Laurian Manta | 29 | Slănic, Prahova | "Habibi Ya Nour El Ain" | – | – | ✔ | ✔ |
| 12 | Daria Bostan | 24 | Bucharest | "Cry Baby" | ✔ | ✔ | ✔ | ✔ |

=== Episode 4 (September 25) ===
Fourth blind auditions results
| Order | Artist | Age(s) | Hometown | Song | Coach's and artist's choices | | | |
| Order | Artist | Age(s) | Hometown | Song | Tudor | Smiley | Irina | Theo & Horia |
|---|---|---|---|---|---|---|---|---|
| 1 | Pantaleo Fabrizio Tritto | 19 | Iași, Iași | "I Put a Spell on You" | ✔ | ✔ | ✔ | ✔ |
| 2 | Samira Paraschivescu | 17 | Bucharest | "Lelițo, fă!" | – | – | ✔ | ✔ |
| 3 | Ștefania Felea | 28 | Moinești, Bacău | "Crazy" | – | – | – | – |
| 4 | Simina Colopelnic | 16 | Remeți, Maramureș | "Part of Your World" | ✔ | ✔ | ✔ | ✔ |
| 5 | Armis Neagu | 28 | Bucharest | "Îmi place când" | – | – | – | – |
| 6 | Diana Rahmatova | – | Chișinău, Moldova | "Feeling Good" | ✔ | – | ✔ | – |
| 7 | Darius Moisa | 20 | Brașov, Brașov | "Moment of Silence" | – | – | ✔ | – |
| 8 | Kate Chinapak Pășcuță | 34 | Baia Mare, Maramureș | "Symphony" | – | – | – | – |
| 9 | Daria Cucu | 19 | Ploiești, Prahova | "În amurg" | – | ✔ | ✔ | ✔ |
| 10 | Bogdan Savin | 32 | Bacău, Bacău | "Isn't She Lovely" | – | ✔ | ✔ | – |

=== Episode 5 (October 2) ===
Fifth blind auditions results
| Order | Artist | Age(s) | Hometown | Song | Coach's and artist's choices | | | |
| Order | Artist | Age(s) | Hometown | Song | Tudor | Smiley | Irina | Theo & Horia |
|---|---|---|---|---|---|---|---|---|
| 1 | Eduard Cotoară | 34 | – | "Bensonhurst Blues" | ✔ | ✔ | ✔ | ✔ |
| 2 | Ana-Maria Tomoioagă | – | – | "Inima nu vrea" | – | – | – | – |
| 3 | Lucas Urdea | 17 | Madrid, Spain | "Solamente Tú" | – | ✔ | ✔ | – |
| 4 | Maria Jugănaru | – | – | "Wicked Game" | ✔ | – | ✔ | ✔ |
| 5 | Claudia Bouleanu | 22 | Craiova, Dolj | "Sexy Silk" | ✔ | ✔ | ✔ | ✔ |
| 6 | Raluca Șorodoc | – | – | "Your Heart Is as Black as Night" | – | – | – | – |
| 7 | Gabriela Negrilă | 18 | Giurgiu, Giurgiu | "Oscar Winning Tears" | – | ✔ | – | – |
| 8 | Bernadett Solymon | – | – | "Hey Mama" | – | – | – | – |
| 9 | Nicoleta Plămădeală | 23 | Chișinău, Moldova | "Like a Prayer" | ✔ | – | – | – |
| 10 | Edward Munteanu | 20 | – | "Cea mai tare piesă" | – | ✔ | ✔ | – |
| 11 | Hayley Crosbie | 26 | Wexford, Ireland | "Ain't Nobody" | – | – | ✔ | ✔ |

=== Episode 6 (October 9) ===
Sixth blind auditions results
| Order | Artist | Age(s) | Hometown | Song | Coach's and artist's choices | | | |
| Order | Artist | Age(s) | Hometown | Song | Tudor | Smiley | Irina | Theo & Horia |
|---|---|---|---|---|---|---|---|---|
| 1 | Ștefan Munteanu | 27 | London, United Kingdom | "Sign of the Times" | ✔ | ✔ | ✔ | ✔ |
| 2 | Raluca Răducanu | 35 | Bucharest | "Am atins cerul cu mâna" | – | – | – | – |
| 3 | Raluca Oaida | 28 | Bucharest | "Me & Mr. Jones" | ✔ | – | ✔ | – |
| 4 | Robert Iosifescu | 28 | Bucharest | "Banii vorbesc" | ✔ | ✔ | ✔ | ✔ |
| 5 | Miruna Nacu | 19 | Țăndărei, Ialomița | "Midnight Sun" | – | – | – | ✔ |
| 6 | Cheherezade Okotaka | 36 | Bucharest | "La Vie en rose" | – | – | – | – |
| 7 | Dominique Simionescu | 24 | Sibiu, Sibiu | "Maybe This Time" | ✔ | ✔ | ✔ | – |
| 8 | Elisa Popovici | 17 | Bucharest | "Săraca inima mea" | – | ✔ | – | – |
| 9 | Raluca Balan | 24 | Botoșani, Botoșani | "După noapte vine zi" | – | – | – | – |
| 10 | Victoria Bădănău | 18 | Chișinău, Moldova | "One Night Only" | – | ✔ | – | ✔ |
| 11 | Titus Pop | 27 | Baia Mare, Maramureș | "Miorița" | ✔ | – | – | ✔ |
| 12 | Bianca Livia Palade | 32 | Craiova, Dolj | "Dacă ochii tăi" | – | – | – | – |
| 13 | Rose Marie Lanciu | 25 | Bârlad, Vaslui | "I Just Might" | – | ✔ | – | – |
| 14 | Maya Giotea | 16 | Timișoara, Timiș | "Who's Lovin' You" | – | ✔ | ✔ | ✘ |

=== Episode 7 (October 16) ===
Seventh blind auditions results
| Order | Artist | Age(s) | Hometown | Song | Coach's and artist's choices | | | |
| Order | Artist | Age(s) | Hometown | Song | Tudor | Smiley | Irina | Theo & Horia |
|---|---|---|---|---|---|---|---|---|
| 1 | Vladislava Popova | – | – | "Bangaranga" | – | – | – | – |
| 2 | Gabriela Amza | 24 | – | "Choke Me" | ✔ | ✔ | ✔ | ✔ |
| 3 | Dragoș Anghel | 36 | – | "Mesecina" | – | ✔ | ✔ | – |
| 4 | Alexia Gorgan | – | – | "Earth Song" | – | – | – | – |
| 5 | Cătălina Mihai | 29 | Hârșova, Constanța | "I'd Rather Go Blind" | – | ✔ | ✘ | ✔ |
| 6 | Ștefania Gurscaia | 17 | Moldova | "Stand Up" | – | – | ✔ | – |
| 7 | Radu Săndulescu | 27 | Iași, Iași | "Running Up That Hill" | ✔ | – | ✔ | – |
| 8 | Virginia Rusu | – | – | "Cristina" | – | – | – | – |
| 9 | Mina Blue | – | – | "Smells Like Teen Spirit" | ✔ | ✔ | ✔ | ✔ |
| 10 | Bogdan Selagea | – | Arad, Arad | "Lay Me Down" | ✔ | ✔ | – (Note: Although the "Second Chance" is used to rescue artists with no chair turns, Irina used it to steal Bogdan with two chairs turned.) | – |
| 11 | Olivia Alexandru | – | – | "Happier Than Ever" | – | – | – | – |
| 12 | Rebecca Zaharia | 25 | Brașov, Brașov | "How Come You Don't Call Me" | ✔ | ✔ | ✔ | ✔ |
| 13 | Marilu Colica | 16 | Bucharest | "Play That Funky Music" | – | – | ✔ | – |
| 14 | Raluca Balan | – | – | "Youkali" | – | – | – | – |
| 15 | Briana Văduva | – | – | "I Am Changing" | ✔ | ✔ | ✔ | ✔ |

=== Episode 8 (October 23) ===
Eighth blind auditions results
| Order | Artist | Age(s) | Hometown | Song | Coach's and artist's choices | | | |
| Order | Artist | Age(s) | Hometown | Song | Tudor | Smiley | Irina | Theo & Horia |
|---|---|---|---|---|---|---|---|---|
| 1 | Dragoș Udilă | 38 | Iași, Iași | "Exodus" | – | ✔ | ✔ | ✔ |
| 2 | Andra Ghiță | 19 | Pitești, Argeș | "Fereastră pentru un orb" | – | ✔ | ✔ | – |
| 3 | Emmanouil Maroulis | 53 | Greece | "Den Ginetai" | – | – | – | – |
| 4 | Anastasia Boroată | 17 | Gorj | "Doina" | – | – | ✔ | – |
| 5 | Youssef Zaki | 32 | Brussels, Belgium | "Nightcall" | – | ✔ | ✔ | ✔ |
| 6 | Laura Magyari | 30 | Brașov, Brașov | "Bring Me to Life" | – | – | – | – |
| 7 | Bianca Dan | 23 | Galați, Galați | "River" | ✔ | ✔ | ✔ | ✔ |
| 8 | Erik Palfi | 15 | Craiova, Olt | "Give Me One Reason" | – | – | – | – |
| 9 | Otilia Teletin | 24 | Crasna, Vaslui | "Lume, lume" | ✔ | ✔ | ✔ | ✔ |
| 10 | Kateryna Biehu | 33 | Odesa, Ukraine | "Never Too Much" | – | – | – | – |
| 11 | Alexandru Stoica | 38 | Ploiești, Prahova | "Rebel Yell" | – | ✔ | – | – |
| 12 | Cristiana Damian | 16 | Sibiu, Sibiu | "Run to You" | ✔ | ✔ | – | ✔ |
| 13 | Ana Popescu | 22 | Drobeta Turnu-Severin, Mehedinți | "Somebody to Love" | – | – | – | – |
| 14 | Horia Neșcu | 23 | Craiova, Dolj | "Voilà" | ✔ | ✔ | ✔ | ✔ |

=== Episode 9 (October 30) ===
Ninth blind auditions results
| Order | Artist | Age(s) | Hometown | Song | Coach's and artist's choices | | | |
| Order | Artist | Age(s) | Hometown | Song | Tudor | Smiley | Irina | Theo & Horia |
|---|---|---|---|---|---|---|---|---|
| 1 | Giulia Haidău | – | – | "Emotions" | ✔ | ✔ | ✔ | ✔ |
| 2 | Vlad Alecu | – | – | "Careless Whisper" | – | – | – | – |
| 3 | Elisa Petre | – | – | "Caught Out in the Rain" | ✔ | – | ✔ | ✔ |
| 4 | Andrei Gaidoș | – | – | "Arcade" | – | – | – | – |
| 5 | Lizuca Bîgu | 27 | – | "A Part of This" | ✔ | ✔ | ✔ | ✔ |
| 6 | Ramona Niculae | – | – | "Cântec de dragoste" | – | – | – | – |
| 7 | Rebecca Oatu | 17 | Vaslui, Vaslui | "Rise Up" | ✔ | – | – | ✔ |
| 8 | Anastasia Antal | – | – | "Don't You Worry 'bout a Thing" | – | – | – | – |
| 9 | Daria Peltea | 23 | – | "Pelin beau, pelin mănânc" | ✔ | ✔ | ✔ | ✔ |
| 10 | Artem Liska | 28 | Ukraine | "Blue Suede Shoes" | – | – | ✔ | – |
| 11 | Natalia Bendre | – | – | "Angels Like You" | – | – | – | – |
| 12 | Alexandru Slăvescu | 19 | Oradea, Bihor | "Le Temps des cathédrales" | – | ✔ | ✔ | ✔ |
| 13 | Andrei Serjant | – | – | "Oriunde ai fi" | – | – | – | – |

== Battles ==
The second stage of the show, the battles, aired from November 6, 2026, immediately after the conclusion of blind auditions, to November 20, 2026, consisting of episodes 10 through 12.

Losing artists may be "stolen" by another coach, becoming new members of that coach's team. Multiple coaches can attempt to steal an artist, resulting in a competition for the artist, who will then decide which team to join. Each coach has two steals to use this round. At the end of this round, nine artists will remain on each team; seven will be the battle winners, while the other two will be stolen from another team.

Battles color key
| Artist won the Battle and advanced to the Knockouts |
| Artist lost the Battle, but was stolen by another coach, and advanced to the Knockouts |
| Artist lost the Battle and was eliminated |

Battles results
| Episode | Coach | Order | Winner | Song | Loser | 'Steal' result | | | |
| Episode | Coach | Order | Winner | Song | Loser | Tudor | Smiley | Irina | Theo & Horia |
|---|---|---|---|---|---|---|---|---|---|
| Episode 10 (Friday, Nov. 6, 2026) | Theo & Horia | 1 | Ion Donciu | "Cheek to Cheek" | Daria Cucu | – | – | – | N/A |
| Episode 10 (Friday, Nov. 6, 2026) | Smiley | 2 | Marius Georgescu | "Nunta" | Ioana State | – | N/A | – | – |
| Episode 10 (Friday, Nov. 6, 2026) | Tudor | 3 | Francoise Manuel | "Oameni" | Eduard Cotoară | N/A | – | – | – |
| Episode 10 (Friday, Nov. 6, 2026) | Irina | 4 | Mina Blue | "Enjoy the Silence" | YXNG | – | – | N/A | – |
| Episode 10 (Friday, Nov. 6, 2026) | Theo & Horia | 5 | Tudor Gavrilă | "If I Ain't Got You" | Dragoș Udilă | – | – | – | N/A |
| Episode 10 (Friday, Nov. 6, 2026) | Smiley | 6 | Elisa Popovici | "Un țigan avea o casă" | Daria Peltea | – | N/A | – | ✔ |
| Episode 10 (Friday, Nov. 6, 2026) | Tudor | 7 | Bogdan Mișcoci | "Stone Cold" | Bianca Dan | N/A | – | – | – |
| Episode 10 (Friday, Nov. 6, 2026) | Irina | 8 | Maya Giotea | "Tell Him" | Alina Nădrag | – | – | N/A | – |
| Episode 10 (Friday, Nov. 6, 2026) | Theo & Horia | 9 | Claudia Bouleanu | "Show Me How You Burlesque" | Alexandra Bordei & Cristina Boghici | – | – | ✔ | N/A |
| Episode 11 (Friday, Nov. 13, 2026) | Theo & Horia | 1 | Luca Mastacan | "I Just Can't Stop Loving You" | Giulia Haidău | ✔ | ✔ | – | N/A |
| Episode 11 (Friday, Nov. 13, 2026) | Irina | 2 | Raluca Oaida | "No Love Dubplate" | Andreea Dincă | – | – | N/A | – |
| Episode 11 (Friday, Nov. 13, 2026) | Smiley | 3 | Cătălina Mihai | "So Easy (To Fall in Love)" | Lavinia Pisăliță | – | N/A | – | – |
| Episode 11 (Friday, Nov. 13, 2026) | Tudor | 4 | Pantaleo Tritto | "At Last" | Rebecca Oatu | N/A | – | – | – |
| Episode 11 (Friday, Nov. 13, 2026) | Theo & Horia | 5 | Teodora Sava | "Ain't No Sunshine" | Briana Văduvă | – | ✔ | ✔ | N/A |
| Episode 11 (Friday, Nov. 13, 2026) | Irina | 6 | Georgiana Munteanu | "Jimmy Samurai" | Corina Sucarov | – | – | N/A | – |
| Episode 11 (Friday, Nov. 13, 2026) | Smiley | 7 | Youssef Zaki | "Ordinary World" | Andra Ghiță | – | N/A | ✔ | – |
| Episode 11 (Friday, Nov. 13, 2026) | Tudor | 8 | Rebecca Zaharia | "Fever" | Daria Bostan | N/A | – | Team full | – |
| Episode 11 (Friday, Nov. 13, 2026) | Irina | 9 | Lizuca Bîgu | "When the Party's Over" | Horia Neșcu | – | – | Team full | – |
| Episode 11 (Friday, Nov. 13, 2026) | Smiley | 10 | Ștefan Munteanu | "Ordinary" | Dafina Bușu | – | N/A | Team full | – |
| Episode 12 (Friday, Nov. 20, 2026) | Tudor | 1 | Elisa Petre | "Will You Still Love Me Tomorrow" | Alessia Anghel | N/A | – | Team full | ✔ |
| Episode 12 (Friday, Nov. 20, 2026) | Theo & Horia | 2 | Mihai Teacă | "Hoy Tengo Ganas de Ti" | Iulia Petrea | – | – | Team full | Team full |
| Episode 12 (Friday, Nov. 20, 2026) | Irina | 3 | Bogdan Savin | "Master Blaster (Jammin')" | Hayley Crosbie | – | – | Team full | Team full |
| Episode 12 (Friday, Nov. 20, 2026) | Smiley | 4 | Rareș Ioan | "True Colors" | Simina Colopelnic | – | N/A | Team full | Team full |
| Episode 12 (Friday, Nov. 20, 2026) | Tudor | 5 | Dominique Simionescu | "The Girl in 14G" | Timea Csaszar | N/A | ✔ | Team full | Team full |
| Episode 12 (Friday, Nov. 20, 2026) | Irina | 6 | Bogdan Selagea | "Strong" | Maria Jugănaru | – | Team full | Team full | Team full |
| Episode 12 (Friday, Nov. 20, 2026) | Theo & Horia | 7 | Gabriela Amza | "Zitti e buoni" | Titus Pop | – | Team full | Team full | Team full |
| Episode 12 (Friday, Nov. 20, 2026) | Tudor | 8 | Robert Iosifescu | "Cu tine" | Nicoleta Plămădeală | N/A | Team full | Team full | Team full |
| Episode 12 (Friday, Nov. 20, 2026) | Smiley | 9 | Alexandru Slăvescu | "Waves" | Alexandru Stoica | ✔ | Team full | Team full | Team full |

== Knockouts ==
The third stage of the show, the knockouts, aired on November 27, 2026, as episode 13.

In this round, each coach divides their nine remaining artists into three groups of three, and each artist performs a song. After the group has performed, the coach selects one of the three to advance to the live shows, and the other two are eliminated. At the end of the round, each coach has three artists who advanced directly to the live shows.

Of the six artists eliminated from each team, one is brought back through an online public vote. This means that four artists from each team will advance to the live shows.

Knockouts color key
| Artist won the Knockout and advanced to the Live Shows |
| Artist lost the Knockout, but was voted by the public to advance to the Live Shows |
| Artist lost the Knockout and was eliminated |

Knockouts results
| Coach | Order | Winner | | Losers | |
| Coach | Order | Song | Artist | Artist | Song |
|---|---|---|---|---|---|
| Theo & Horia | 1 | "Analog" | Mihai Teacă | Daria Peltea | "California Love" |
| Theo & Horia | 1 | "Analog" | Mihai Teacă | Gabriela Amza | "Suflet gol" |
| Irina | 2 | "Angel" | Bogdan Selagea | Lizuca Bîgu | "Îți pare rău" |
| Irina | 2 | "Angel" | Bogdan Selagea | Bogdan Savin | "A Song for You" |
| Tudor | 3 | "She's Gone" | Robert Iosifescu | Alexandru Stoica | "Zombie" |
| Tudor | 3 | "She's Gone" | Robert Iosifescu | Pantaleo Tritto | "O să fie bine" |
| Smiley | 4 | "Rise Like a Phoenix" | Rareș Ioan | Briana Văduvă | "Déjà Vu" |
| Smiley | 4 | "Rise Like a Phoenix" | Rareș Ioan | Alexandru Slăvescu | "Somewhere Only We Know" |
| Theo & Horia | 5 | "Don't Stop 'Til You Get Enough" | Tudor Gavrilă | Alessia Anghel | "Love on the Brain" |
| Theo & Horia | 5 | "Don't Stop 'Til You Get Enough" | Tudor Gavrilă | Claudia Bouleanu | "Iartă-mă tu" |
| Irina | 6 | "Stand by Me" | Mina Blue | Alexandra Bordei & Cristina Boghici | "Lino, Leano" |
| Irina | 6 | "Stand by Me" | Mina Blue | Raluca Oaida | "Rolling in the Deep" |
| Tudor | 7 | "Raise Your Horns" | Rebecca Zaharia | Francoise Manuel | "Fear of the Dark" |
| Tudor | 7 | "Raise Your Horns" | Rebecca Zaharia | Bogdan Mișcoci | "Everybody Hurts" |
| Smiley | 8 | "I Still Haven't Found What I'm Looking For" | Ștefan Munteanu | Timea Csaszar | "Vama Veche" |
| Smiley | 8 | "I Still Haven't Found What I'm Looking For" | Ștefan Munteanu | Elisa Popovici | "Doina" |
| Theo & Horia | 9 | "Nobody's Perfect" | Teodora Sava | Luca Mastacan | "Hello" |
| Theo & Horia | 9 | "Nobody's Perfect" | Teodora Sava | Ion Donciu | "You Don't Own Me" |
| Irina | 10 | "Mocirița cu trifoi" | Maya Giotea | Georgiana Munteanu | "History Repeating" |
| Irina | 10 | "Mocirița cu trifoi" | Maya Giotea | Andra Ghiță | "Stronger (What Doesn't Kill You)" |
| Tudor | 11 | "Cry Me a River" | Giulia Haidău | Elisa Petre | "Creep" |
| Tudor | 11 | "Cry Me a River" | Giulia Haidău | Dominique Simionescu | "Someone Gets Hurt" |
| Smiley | 12 | "Cryin'" | Cătălina Mihai | Marius Georgescu | "Somn bizar" |
| Smiley | 12 | "Cryin'" | Cătălina Mihai | Youssef Zaki | "Yellow" |
