= Vocea României =

Romanian reality singing competition

- Genre: Talent show
- Created by: John de Mol; Roel van Velzen
- Directed by: Peter Majesky; Melanie Triebel; Bogdan Măciucă; Loredana Petcu; Greta Dan; Eugen Dinu; Daniel Eftimie; Lavinia Boureci; Daniel Iancu; Bogdan Dumitrescu
- Presented by: Pavel Bartoș; Roxana Ionescu; Nicoleta Luciu; Backstage: Vlad Roșca; Oana Tache; Lili Sandu; Irina Fodor; Laura Giurcanu; Iulia Pârlea; Alina Ceușan; Gina Pistol; Adela Popescu
- Judges: Smiley; Loredana; Marius Moga; Horia Brenciu; Tudor Chirilă; Adrian Despot; Andra; Irina Rimes; Theo Rose; The Motans
- Narrated by: Pavel Bartoș; Florin Goldic (4–)
- Country of origin: Romania
- Original language: Romanian
- No. of seasons: 14
- No. of episodes: 172

Production
- Executive producers: Dan Alexandrescu (4–); Robert Lionte (1–3)
- Producers: Ana Maria Modâlcă (4–); Melanie Triebel (4–); Mona Segall (1–3)
- Production locations: Studiourile Media Pro, Buftea (1-4); Studiourile Kentauros, Ștefăneștii de Jos (5-)
- Production companies: Talpa (2011–2019); ITV Studios (2022–present)

Original release
- Network: Pro TV
- Release: September 27, 2011 – present

Vocea României (Romanian pronunciation: [ˈvotʃe̯a romɨˈni.ej]; 'The Voice of Romania') is a Romanian reality singing competition broadcast on PRO TV. Based on the original The Voice of Holland, the concept of the series is to find new singing talent contested by aspiring singers, age 16 or over, drawn from public auditions. The winner is determined by television viewers voting by telephone and he is entitled to a €100,000 prize and a record deal with Universal Records for winning the competition. There have been thirteen winners of the show to date: Ștefan Stan, Julie Mayaya, Mihai Chițu, Tiberiu Albu, Cristina Bălan, Teodora Buciu, Ana Munteanu, Bogdan Ioan, Dragoș Moldovan, Iulian Nunucă, Alexandra Căpitănescu, Aura Șova, and Alessia Pop.

The Voice of Romania began airing on September 27, 2011, as an autumn TV season program. The series employs a panel of four coaches who critique the artists' performances. Each coach guides their teams of selected artists through the remainder of the season. They also compete to ensure that their act wins the competition, thus making them the winning coach. The original coaching panel consisted of Smiley, Horia Brenciu, Loredana Groza and Marius Moga. The panel for the current fourteenth season features Smiley, Tudor Chirilă, Irina Rimes, and Brenciu & Theo Rose as a duo. Other coaches from the previous seasons include Adrian Despot, Andra, and The Motans.

== Format ==
One of the important premises of the show is the quality of the singing talent. Four coaches, themselves popular performing artists, train the talents in their group and occasionally perform with them. Talents are selected in blind auditions, where the coaches cannot see, but only hear the auditioner.

The series consists of four phases:

- Blind audition;
- Battle round;
- Knockout stage;
- Live performance shows.

=== Blind audition ===
Four judges/coaches, all famous musicians, will choose teams of 12, 14 or 16 contestants each through a four-episode-long blind audition process. Each judge has the length of the auditionee's performance to decide if he or she wants that singer on his or her team; if two or more judges want the same singer then the singer gets to choose which coach they want to work with. In the 8th season, a new twist called "Block" is featured, which allows one coach to block another coach from getting a contestant.

=== Battle round ===
Each team of singers is mentored and developed by its respective coach. In the second stage, called the battle phase, coaches have two of their team members battle against each other directly by singing the same song together, with the coach choosing which team member to advance from each of six individual "battles". In the first three seasons, at the end of the battle phase, there is a sing-off between two contestants of each coach, singing their audition songs. The coach chooses which one of them will join the other artists into the first live round. Within that first live round, the surviving acts from each team again compete head-to-head, with a combination of public and jury vote deciding who advances onto the next round. A new element was added in season three; coaches were given two "steals", allowing each coach to select two individuals who were eliminated during a battle round by another coach.

=== Knockout stage ===
The third stage of the competition is the 'Knockout stage'. It was first introduced in the sixth series (2016). The four coaches will enter this stage with nine team members each; eight winners of the battle phase, and two stolen members. Artists perform a 'killer song' of their choosing and the coaches each pick three members of their team to go through to the live shows, creating a final 12 for the public vote.

=== Live performance shows ===
The final stage, 'Live shows', is where the artists perform in front of the coaches and an audience, broadcast live. Each coach will have four artists in their team to begin with and the artists will go head-to-head in the competition to win the public votes. These will determine which artist advances to the final eight. The remaining three artists' future in the show will be determined by the coaches, choosing who will progress.

The final eight artists will compete in a live broadcast. However, the coaches will have a 50/50 say with the audience and the public in deciding which artists move on to the 'final four' phase. In the latter, each coach will have one member who will continue. In season four, the proportion was changed to 40/60. Season five changed the system completely and introduced "crossed duels": each of the eight contestants battles one from another team. The winner qualifies for the final. This opens the possibility of coaches ending up with 0, 1 or 2 contestants in the final

The final (the winner round) will be decided upon by the public vote.

== Host and coaches ==
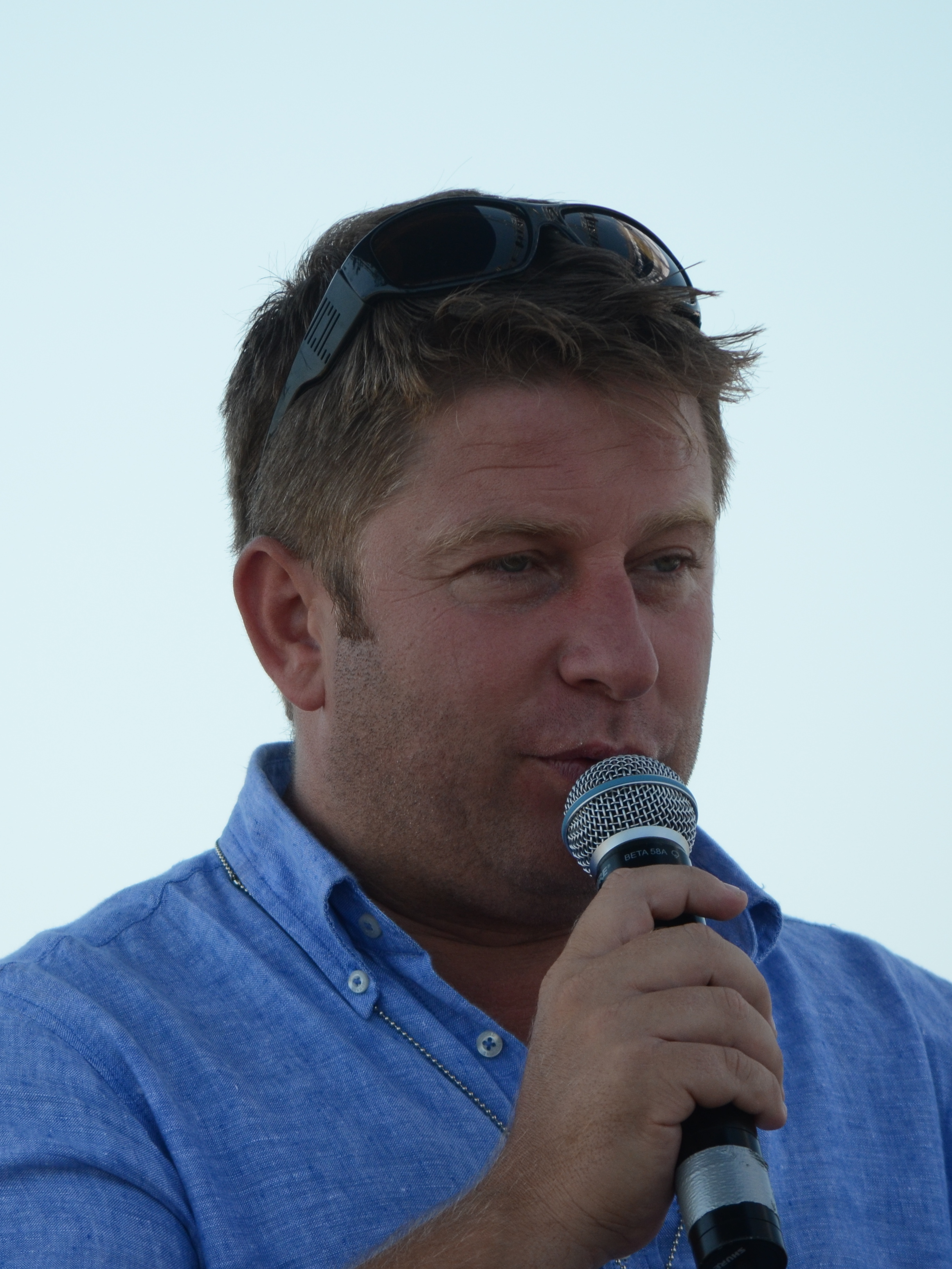
Pavel Bartoș

=== Host ===
Pavel Bartoș has hosted the series since the inaugural season. Roxana Ionescu was co-host in season one but she was replaced by singer and actress Nicoleta Luciu. Vlad Roșca serve as the original "backstage, online and social media correspondent". In seasons four and five, Roșca was replaced by Oana Tache. Tache was replaced by Lili Sandu, starting with season six. In season eight, Irina Fodor replaced Lili Sandu as the social media correspondent, while Laura Giurcanu became the vlogger of the show.

=== Coaches ===
In August 2011 pop singer and actress Loredana, R'n'B musician and composer Marius Moga, singer and TV host Horia Brenciu and former Simplu member Smiley were confirmed coaches for the Voice of Romania. In season four, Brenciu was replaced with Vama lead member, Tudor Chirilă. In season seven, Moga was replaced with Vița de Vie lead member Adrian Despot. In season eight, Loredana and Despot were replaced by Irina Rimes and Andra. In season nine, Brenciu returned as a coach replacing Andra. In season ten, Brenciu was replaced by The Motans soloist Denis Roabeṣ, while Smiley will form a duo with Theo Rose.

Coaches gallery

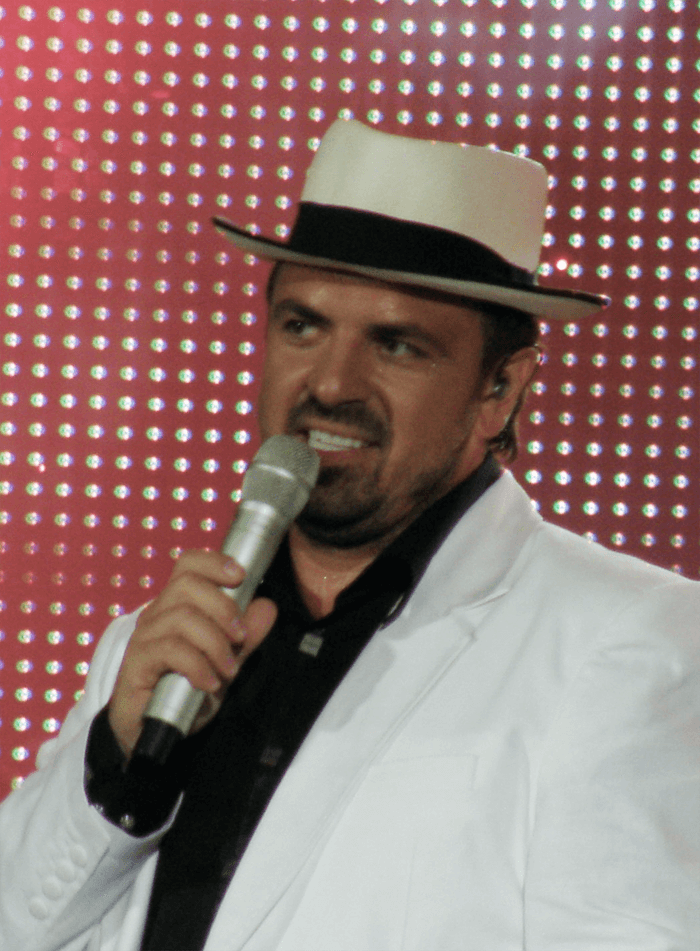
Horia Brenciu (solo 2011–2013, 2019) (duo, 2023–)

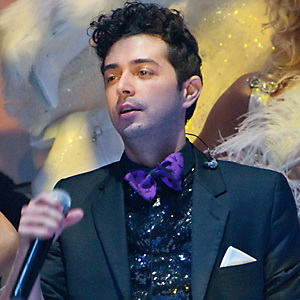
Marius Moga (2011–2016)

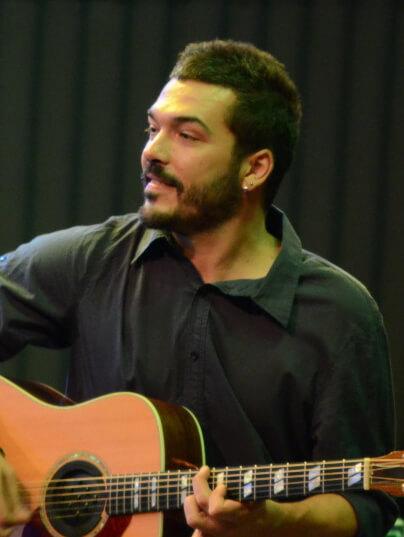
Adrian Despot (2017)

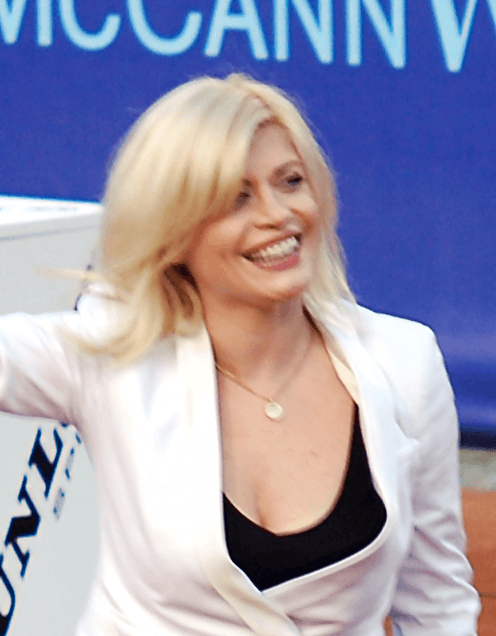
Loredana Groza (2011–2017)

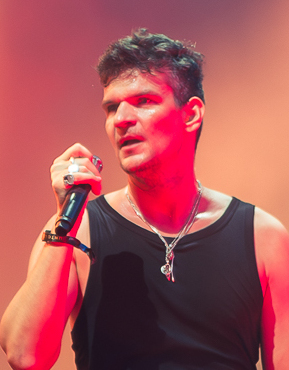
Tudor Chirilă (2014–)

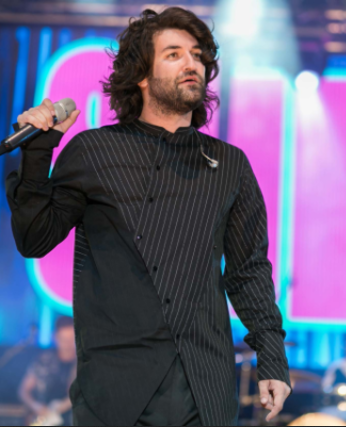
Smiley (solo, 2011–2019, 2023–) (duo, 2022)

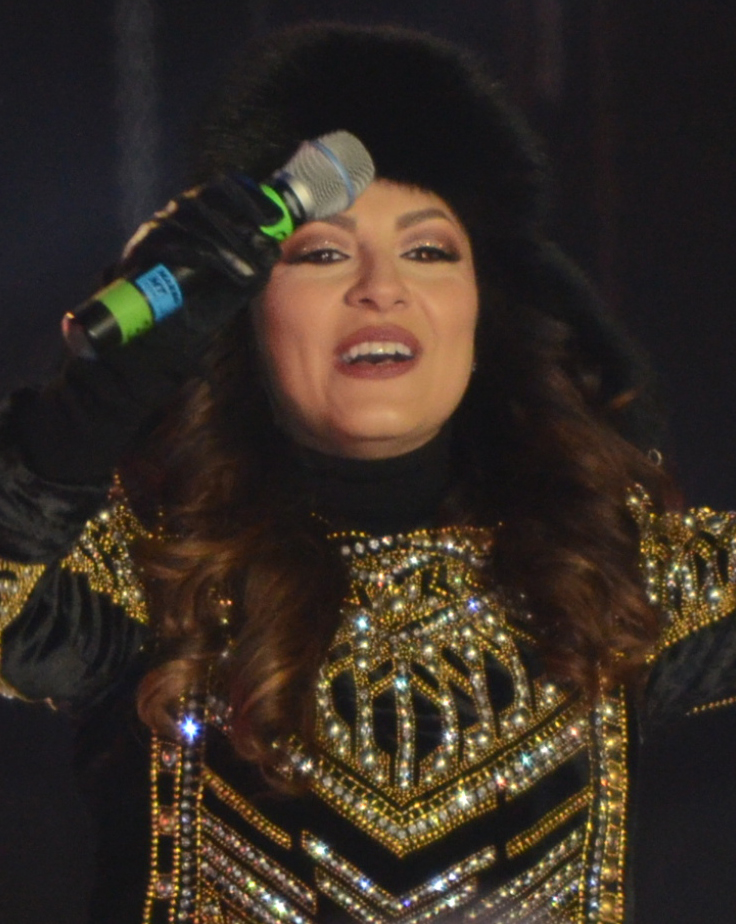
Andra (2018)

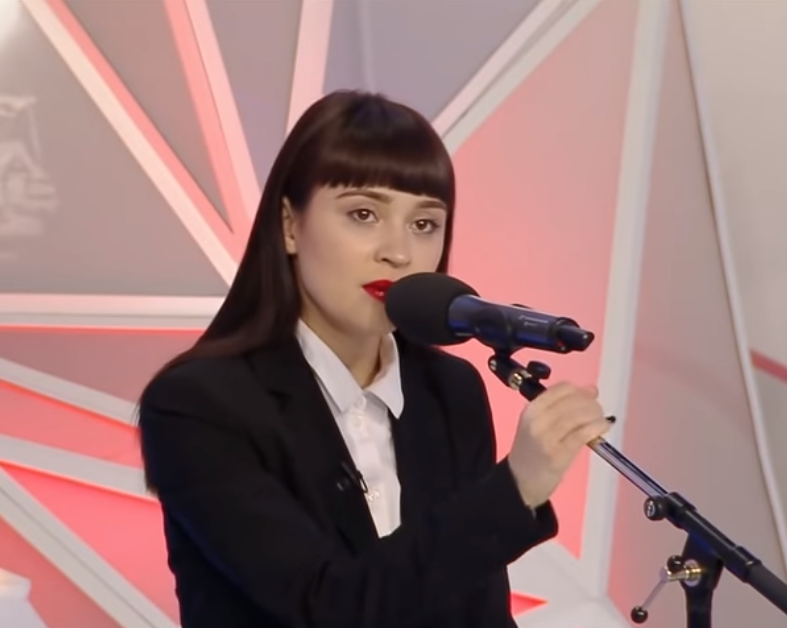
Irina Rimes (2018–2026)

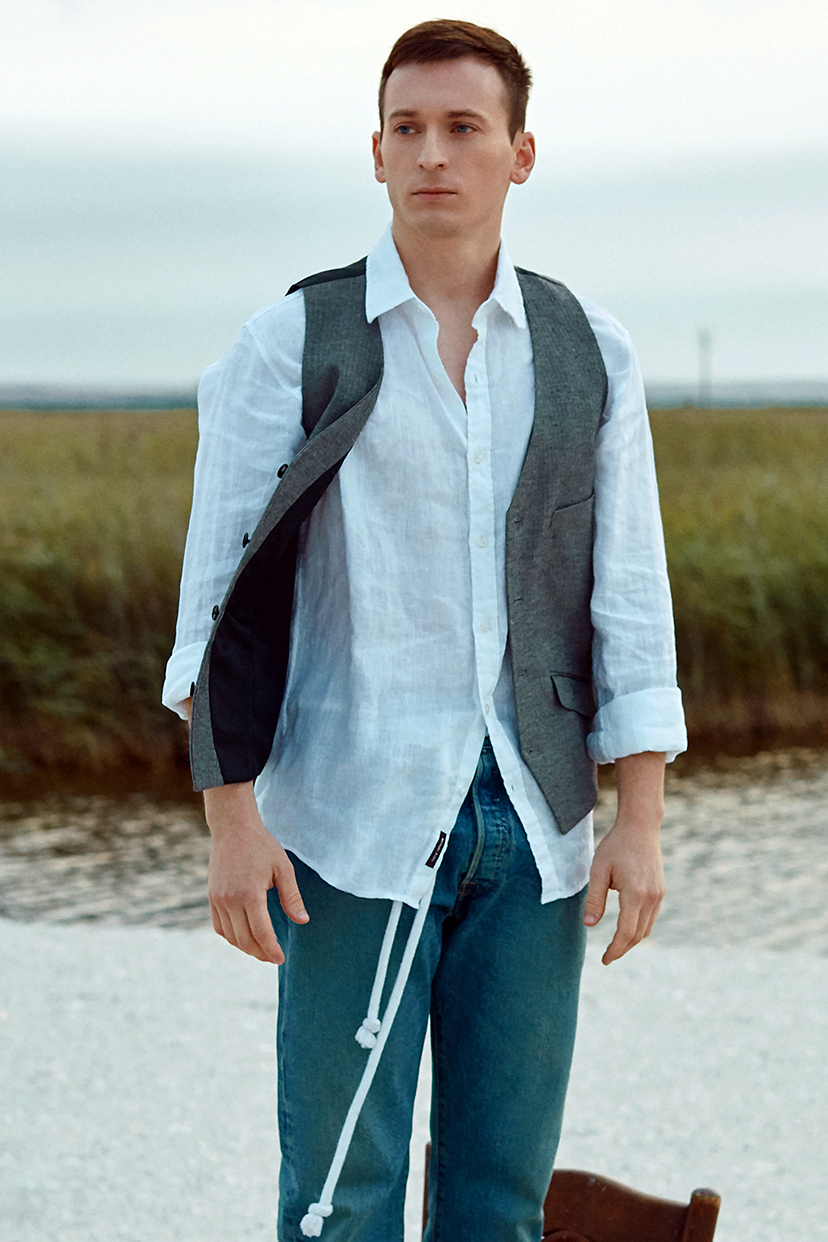
The Motans (2022)

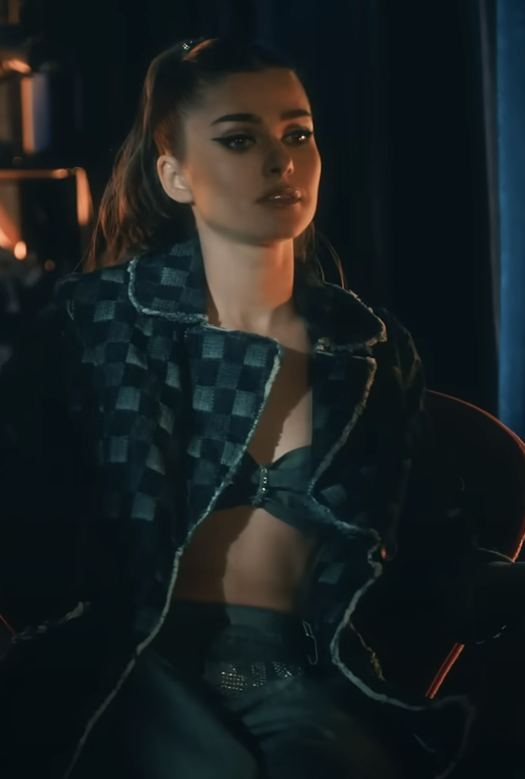
Theo Rose (duo, 2022–)

=== Timeline of coaches ===
Coach	Seasons													
Coach	1	2	3	4	5	6	7	8	9	10	11	12	13	14
Smiley														
Loredana														
Moga														
Brenciu														
Tudor														
Despot														
Irina														
Andra														
Denis														
Theo														

=== Line-up of Coaches ===
Coaches' line-up by chairs order
Season	Year	Coaches			
Season	Year	1	2	3	4
1	2011	Brenciu	Loredana	Smiley	Moga
2	2012	Brenciu	Loredana	Smiley	Moga
3	2013	Brenciu	Loredana	Smiley	Moga
4	2014	Tudor	Loredana	Smiley	Moga
5	2015	Tudor	Loredana	Smiley	Moga
6	2016	Tudor	Loredana	Smiley	Moga
7	2017	Tudor	Smiley	Loredana	Despot
8	2018	Tudor	Irina	Andra	Smiley
9	2019	Tudor	Smiley	Irina	Brenciu
10	2022	Tudor	Irina	Smiley & Theo	Denis
11	2023	Tudor	Irina	Theo & Horia	Smiley
12	2024	Tudor	Irina	Theo & Horia	Smiley
13	2025	Tudor	Smiley	Irina	Theo & Horia
14	2026	Tudor	Smiley	Irina	Theo & Horia

== Series overview ==
Warning: the following table presents a significant amount of different colors.

Teams color key
Artist from Team Smiley	Artist from Team Tudor	Artist from Team Denis
Artist from Team Loredana	Artist from Team Despot	Artist from Team Smiley & Theo
Artist from Team Brenciu	Artist from Team Irina	Artist from Team Theo & Brenciu
Artist from Team Moga	Artist from Team Andra

Vocea României series overview
Season	Aired	Winner	Runner-up	Third place	Fourth place	Winning coach	Hosts
1	2011	Ștefan Stan	Dragoș Chircu	Iuliana Pușchilă	Cristian Sanda	Smiley	Pavel Bartoș
2	2012	Julie Mayaya	Imre Vízi	Cristi Nistor	Tibi Scobiola	Horia Brenciu	Pavel Bartoș
3	2013	Mihai Chițu	Sânziana Niculae	Adrian Nour	Marius Marin	Horia Brenciu	Pavel Bartoș
4	2014	Tiberiu Albu	Anda Dimitriu	Maria Hojda	Aliona Munteanu	Tudor Chirilă	Pavel Bartoș
5	2015	Cristina Bălan	Tomi Weissbuch	Tobi Ibitoye	Michel Kotcha	Tudor Chirilă	Pavel Bartoș
6	2016	Teodora Buciu	Alexandru Mușat	Robert Botezan	Ioana Ignat	Tudor Chirilă	Pavel Bartoș
7	2017	Ana Munteanu	Meriam Ndubuisi	Zsuzsana Cerveni	Andrada Crețu	Smiley	Pavel Bartoș
8	2018	Bogdan Ioan	Dora Gaitanovici	Alma Boiangiu	Céline Coca	Smiley	Pavel Bartoș
9	2019	Dragoș Moldovan	Andi Țolea	Jasmina Răsădean	Elena Bozian	Tudor Chirilă	Pavel Bartoș
10	2022	Iulian Nunucă	Andra Botez	Teodor Debu	Winaël Baldus	Tudor Chirilă	Pavel Bartoș
11	2023	Alexandra Căpitănescu	Vlad Musta	Melisa Antonesi	Alex Maxim	Tudor Chirilă	Pavel Bartoș
12	2024	Aura Șova	Robert Lukian	Raluca Moldoveanu	Narcisa Badea	Tudor Chirilă	Pavel Bartoș
13	2025	Alessia Pop	Anita Petruescu	Raisa Radu	Eva Nicolescu	Tudor Chirilă	Pavel Bartoș
14	2026	Current season					Pavel Bartoș

== Coaches' results ==
Considering the final placement of the contestants who are members of their team (not the final placement of the coaches):

Coaches' results
Coach	Winner	Runner-up	Third place	Fourth place
Tudor Chirilǎ	8 times (4–6, 9–13)	Once (7)	Once (8)	—
Smiley	Thrice (1, 7–8)	4 times (6, 9, 12–13)	Twice (3, 5)	4 times (2, 4–5, 11)
Horia Brenciu	Twice (2–3)	—	Once (1)	Once (9)
Marius Moga	—	4 times (2–5)	-	Twice (1, 6)
Irina Rimes	—	3 times (8, 10–11)	Twice (9, 13)	Once (12)
Loredana Groza	—	Once (2)	Thrice (2, 4, 7)	Once (3)
Theo Rose & Horia Brenciu	—	—	Twice (11–12)	Once (13)
Denis 'The Motans' Roabeş	—	—	Once (10)	—
Adrian Despot	—	—	—	Once (7)
Andra	—	—	—	Once (8)
Smiley & Theo Rose	—	—	—	Once (10)

== Season synopses ==
Names in bold type indicate the winner of the season.

=== Season 1 ===
The first season of The Voice of Romania premiered on September 27, 2011. and concluded on 26 December. The Judges were pop singer and actress Loredana Groza, R'n'B musician and composer Marius Moga, singer and TV host Horia Brenciu and former Simplu member Smiley. Pavel Bartoș with Roxana Ionescu and Vlad Roșca respectively appeared as the hosts and social media correspondent. Contestant auditions were held in Cluj-Napoca, Timișoara, Iași, Brașov and Bucharest during April and May.

Each coach was allowed to advance five contestants to the live shows:

**Team Brenciu**	**Team Loredana**	**Team Smiley**	**Team Moga**
Iuliana Pușchilă	Dragoș Chircu	**Ștefan Stan**	Cristian Sanda
Irina Tănase	Iulian Canaf	Cătălin Dobre	Liviu Teodorescu
Daniel Dragomir	Alexandra Crăescu	Anthony Icuagu	Oana Radu
Robert Patai	Oana Brutaru	Marcel Lovin	Aldo Blaga
Cristina Vasiu	Aminda	Mihai Popistașu	Sebastian Muntean

Four contestants were advanced to the final round. Stan was announced as the winner of the season, while Chircu was declared the runner-up. Third and fourth places were a draw between Pușchilă and Sanda. Stan won by 37.67% of the votes.

=== Season 2 ===
The Voice of Romania returned to Pro TV for a second season which began on September 25, 2012. All four coaches are returning for season two, while Co-presenter Roxana Ionescu was replaced with singer and actress Nicoleta Luciu. The second season ended on December 26, 2011. Contestant auditions were held in Cluj-Napoca, Timișoara, Iași, Brașov and Bucharest during 4–29 June.

Each coach was allowed to advance six contestants to the live shows:

**Team Brenciu**	**Team Loredana**	**Team Smiley**	**Team Moga**
**Julie Mayaya**	Cristi Nistor	Tibi Scobiola	Imre Vízi
Laura Gherescu	Daria Corbu	Maria-Mirabela Cismaru	Maria Cojocaru
Loredana Ciubotaru	Ana Maria Alexia	Robert Reamzy	Vlad Simion
Silviu Pașca	Ciprian Teodorescu	Fely Donose	Laurian Manta
Andreea Olariu	Teodor Manciulea	Cezar Dometi	Dalma Kovács
Mihail Gheorghe	Nicoleta Gavriliță	David Bryan	Ioana Cristea

Four contestants were advanced to the final round. Mayaya was announced as the winner of the season, while Vízi, Nistor, and Scobiola placed second, third, and fourth, respectively.

=== Season 3 ===
The third season of Vocea României premiered on September 28, 2013, and concluded on December 26. All personnel returned from the previous season. A new element was added in season three; coaches were given two "steals", allowing each coach to select two individuals who were eliminated during a battle round by another coach. Contestant auditions were held in Cluj-Napoca, Timișoara, Iași, Brașov and Bucharest during April and May.

Each coach was allowed to advance eight contestants to the live shows:

**Team Brenciu**	**Team Loredana**	**Team Smiley**	**Team Moga**
**Mihai Chițu**	Marius Marin	Adrian Nour	Sânziana Niculae
Ana Maria Mirică	Muneer al-Obeidli	Claudia Iuga	Jovana Milovanović
Georgia Dascălu	Alina Dorobanțu	Stella Anița	Felix Burdușă
Denisa Moșincat	Florin Mândru	Iolanda Moldoveanu	Andi Grasu
Árpi Török	Andrei Chermeleu	Nicoleta Țicală	Angelo Simonică
Florin Ilinca	Kinga Fárkás	George Secioreanu	Elena Șalaru
Andrei Hanghiuc	Iulia Dumitrache	Lucian Frâncu	Andrei Loică
Florin Timbuc	Aurel Niamțu	Răzvan Alexa	Dana Torop

Four contestants were advanced to the final round. Chițu was announced as the winner of the season, while Niculae, Nour, and Marin placed second, third, and fourth, respectively.

=== Season 4 ===
The fourth season of Vocea României premiered on September 16, 2014, and concluded on December 19. In this season, Brenciu was replaced with Vama lead member, Tudor Chirilă and Roșca was replaced by Oana Tache. Contestant auditions were held in Cluj-Napoca, Timișoara, Iași, Brașov and Bucharest during June and July.

Each coach was allowed to advance eight contestants to the live shows:

**Team Tudor**	**Team Loredana**	**Team Smiley**	**Team Moga**
**Tiberiu Albu**	Maria Hojda	Aliona Munteanu	Anda Dimitriu
Ligia Hojda	Ilinca Băcilă	Gelu Graur	Brigitta Balogh
Ivana Farc	Larisa Mihăeș	Maria Șimandi	Claudiu Rusu
Andreea Avarvari	Andrei Cheteleș	Vladimir Pocorschi	Alexandru Bunghez
Petra Acker	Florin Răduță	Anca Petcu	Alina Dogaru
Tudor Man	Ioana Satmari	Fabian Sasu	Florian Rus
Iulia Ferchiu	Lucian Colareza	Alina Anușca	Ioan Bîgea
Florin Timbuc	Valentin Uzun	Alin Gheorghișan	Maria Constantin

Four contestants were advanced to the final round. Albu was announced as the winner of the season, while Dimitriu, Hojda, and Moon placed second, third, and fourth, respectively.

=== Season 5 ===
The fifth season of Vocea României premiered on September 18, 2015. All personnel returned from the previous season. Contestant auditions were held in Cluj-Napoca, Timișoara, Iași, Brașov and Bucharest during May and June.

Each coach was allowed to advance eight contestants to the live shows:

**Team Tudor**	**Team Loredana**	**Team Smiley**	**Team Moga**
**Cristina Bălan**	Antonio Fabrizi	Tobi Ibitoye	Tomi Weissbuch
Tincuța Fernea	Mihai Dragomir Rait	Michel Kotcha	Alex Florea
Cristina Lupu	Florentina Ciună	Larisa Ciortan	Delia Pitu
Sabrina Stroe	Cristina Vasopol	Nora Deneș	Irina Pelin
Claudia Andas	Iulian Selea	Diana Cazan	Cristina Stroe
Daniel Bălan	Bogdan Vlădău	Diana Hetea	Andrei Vitan
Roxana Morar	Gabriela Amzaru	Ruxandra Anania	Elvis Silitră
Armand Murzea	Alexandra Mitroi	Sergiu Ferat	Adrian Tănase

The season finale aired on December 18, 2015. Team Tudor and Team Moga had one finalist each, while Team Smiley had two. Both semi-finalists in Team Loredana had been eliminated. Cristina Bălan, best known as the lead vocalist of the bands Impact and ABCD and mentored by Tudor Chirilă, was declared winner of the season. It was Chirilă's second consecutive victory as a coach.

=== Season 6 ===
The sixth season of Vocea României premiered on September 9, 2016. All personnel returned from the previous season. Contestant auditions were held in Cluj-Napoca, Timișoara, Iași, Brașov and Bucharest during March and April.

Each coach was allowed to advance three contestants to the live shows:

**Team Tudor**	**Team Loredana**	**Team Smiley**	**Team Moga**
**Teodora Buciu**	Ștefan Roșcovan	Alexandru Mușat	Ioana Ignat
Robert Botezan	Andreea Ioncea	Ramona Nerra	Ionuț Trif
Iuliana Dobre	Howard Dell	Sebastian Seredinschi	Alexandru Baroc

The season finale aired on December 16, 2016. Team Smiley and Team Moga had one finalist each, while Team Tudor had two. For the second consecutive times, Loredana did not have any artist in final show. Teodora Buciu, mentored by Tudor Chirilă, was declared winner of the season. It was Chirilă's third consecutive victory as a coach.

=== Season 7 ===
The seventh season of Vocea României premiered on September 8, 2017. In this season, Moga was replaced with Vița de Vie lead member, Adrian Despot. Contestant auditions were held in Cluj-Napoca, Timișoara, Iași and Bucharest during February, May and June.

**Team Tudor**	**Team Smiley**	**Team Loredana**	**Team Despot**
Meriam Jane Ndubuisi	**Ana Munteanu**	Zsuzsana Cerveni	Andrada Crețu
Ștefan Știucă	Amir Arafat	Diana Brescan	Manó Ráduly Botond
Laurențiu Mihaiu	Paul Bătinaș	Adriana Ciobanu	Andreea Dragu
Maria Rădeanu	Octavian Casian	Amalia Uruc	Robert Pița
Daria Grigoraș	Răzvan Mărcuci	Rufus Martin	Alexandru Arnăutu
Lidia Isac	Ioana Vișinescu	Bogdan Stănică	Catarina Sandu
Amedeo Chiriac	Ioana Barbă	Tudor Bilețchi	Oana Mirică
Răzvan Encuna	Olga Roman	Mihail Tirică	Valentin Poienariu

The season finale aired on December 15, 2017. Four contestants were advanced to the final round, one from each team. Munteanu was announced as the winner of the season, while Ndubuisi, Cerveni, and Crețu placed second, third, and fourth, respectively.

=== Season 8 ===
The eighth season of Vocea României premiered on September 7, 2018. In this season, Groza and Despot was replaced with Rimes and Andra. Contestant auditions were held in Cluj-Napoca, Timișoara, Iași and Bucharest during March and February.

**Team Tudor**	**Team Irina**	**Team Andra**	**Team Smiley**
Alma Boiangiu	Dora Gaitanovici	Céline Mădălina Coca	**Bogdan Ioan**
Romanița Fricosu	Alexa Dragu	Renate Grad	Vitalie Maciunschi
Lavinia Rusu	Alina Statie	Silviu Murariu	Sorina Bică
Mihai Meiroș	Eva Timuș	Sara Chiavegato	Letiția Roman

The season finale aired on December 14, 2018. Four contestants were advanced to the final round, one from each team. Ioan was announced as the winner of the season, while Gaitanovici, Boiangiu, and Coca placed second, third, and fourth, respectively.

=== Season 9 ===
The ninth season of Vocea României premiered in September 2019. In this season, Andra was replaced by Brenciu, who last coached in season 3. Contestant auditions were held in Cluj-Napoca, Timișoara, Iași and Bucharest during March and April.

**Team Tudor**	**Team Smiley**	**Team Irina**	**Team Brenciu**
**Dragoș Moldovan**	Andi Țolea	Jasmina Răsădean	Elena Bozian
Mădălina Lefter	Elena Ilie	Bogdan Dumitraș	Adriana Simionescu
Gabriel Bîscoveanu	Renee Santana	Amanda Aprotosoaei	Oana & Răzvan Ailoae

The season finale aired on December 20, 2019. Four contestants were advanced to the final round, one from each team. Moldovan was announced as the winner of the season, while Țolea, Răsădean, and Bozian placed second, third, and fourth, respectively.

=== "Reuniunea" ===
Due to the COVID-19 pandemic, the show did not return in the fall of 2020, as usual. Instead, on Romania's National Day, a reunion special took place. The special featured all of the show's coaches so far (except for Loredana Groza, who is under contract with the rival television, Antena 1) and some of the contestants and winners.

=== Season 10 ===
The tenth season of Vocea României premiered on September 9, 2022, after 2 years of absence due to the COVID-19 pandemic. In this season, Horia Brenciu was replaced by Denis 'The Motans', while Smiley was joined by Theo Rose, in a duo. Contestant auditions were held in Cluj-Napoca, Timișoara, Iași and Bucharest during March and April.

**Team Tudor**	**Team Irina**	**Team Smiley & Theo**	**Team Denis**
**Iulian Nunucă**	Andra Botez	Winael Baldus	Teodor Debu
Ioana Vecerdea	Rianna Rusu	Eduard Stoica	Anastasia Budișteanu
Valeria Marcu	Theo Rusu	Vlad Nicolici	Kam Cahayadi

=== Season 11 ===
The eleventh season of Vocea României premiered on September 8, 2023. Denis Roabeș announced on 11 June 2023 that he will give up to his role as a coach on the show due his plans for musical career. In July 2023, it was announced that Tudor Chirilă and Irina Rimes would return as coaches. Smiley returned as a solo coach, while Horia Brenciu joined Theo Rose in the duo chair.

**Team Tudor**	**Team Irina**	**Team Theo & Brenciu**	**Team Smiley**
**Alexandra Căpitănescu**	Vlad Musta	Melisa Antonesi	Alex Maxim
Raluca Radu	Delia Constantin	Alexandra Sîrghi	Ana Stănciulescu
Maria Chideanu	Sandro Machado	Gilberta Wilson	Johnny Bădulescu

=== Season 12 ===
The twelfth season of Vocea României premiered on 13 September 2024. On 16 July 2024, via the show's Instagram page, Tudor Chirilă, Irina Rimes, Smiley and Horia Brenciu & Theo Rose all returned for their ninth, fifth, twelfth, sixth (Brenciu) and third (Theo Rose) seasons as coaches.

**Team Tudor**	**Team Irina**	**Team Theo & Brenciu**	**Team Smiley**
**Aura Șova**	Narcisa Badea	Raluca Moldoveanu	Robert Lukian
Giulia Tabără	Oleg Spînu	Colin Doljescu	Andra Argișanu
Shahin Deghani	Romina Apostol	Bogdan Medvedi	Eliza Chifu

=== Season 13 ===
The thirteenth season of Vocea României premiered on 12 September 2025. Tudor Chirilă, Irina Rimes, Smiley and Horia Brenciu & Theo Rose all returned for their tenth, sixth, thirteenth, seventh (Brenciu) and fourth (Theo Rose) seasons as coaches.

**Team Tudor**	**Team Smiley**	**Team Irina**	**Team Theo & Brenciu**
**Alessia Pop**	Anita Petruescu	Raisa Radu	Eva Nicolescu
Briana Mogdaș	Andreea Dobre	Andrei Duțu	Paul Ananie
Maria Crîșmariu	Ana-Maria Mărgean	Adrian Cârciova	Denisa Cramba
Soledad Baciu	Peter Donegan	Sunamita Beza	Bianca Mihai

=== Season 14 ===
The fourteenth season of Vocea României premiered on 4 September 2026. Tudor Chirilă, Irina Rimes, Smiley and Horia Brenciu & Theo Rose all returned for their eleventh, seventh, fourteenth, eighth (Brenciu) and fifth (Theo Rose) seasons as coaches.

== Ratings ==
Series	Episodes	Series premiere	Series premiere viewing figures	Series finale	Series finale viewing figures
1	15	September 27, 2011	1.07	December 26, 2011	1.48
2	15	September 25, 2012	1.70	December 26, 2012	1.83
3	14	September 28, 2013	2.18	December 26, 2013	1.79
4	15	September 16, 2014	1.91	December 19, 2014	1.66
5	15	September 18, 2015	1.57	December 18, 2015	1.53
6	16	September 9, 2016	1.60	December 16, 2016	1.30
7	16	September 8, 2017	1.69	December 15, 2017	1.42
8	18	September 7, 2018	1.40	December 14, 2018	1.56
9	16	September 6, 2019	1.67	December 20, 2019	1.45
10	16	September 9, 2022	1.44	December 23, 2022	1.37
11	15	September 8, 2023		December 15, 2023	
12	15	September 13, 2024		December 20, 2024	
13	15	September 12, 2025		December 19, 2025	
14		September 4, 2026			

== Music ==
=== The Voice of Romania Album ===
Vocea României

Compilation album by The Voice of Romania All Stars
- Released: December 18, 2014
- Genres: fado; hip hop; jazz; pop; R&B; rock; soul
- Languages: english; italian; portuguese; romanian
- Label: Universal Music România
- Compilers: ProTV; PRO FM; Telekom

The Voice of Romania album is the first compilation album by the finalists from the first three seasons. It was released digitally on December 18, 2014.

No.	Title	Contestant	Artist
1.	"În lipsa mea"	Liviu Teodorescu	Smiley și Uzzi
2.	"Jump"	Silviu Pașca	Kris Kross
3.	"Ride It"	Muneer al-Obeidli	Jay Sean
4.	"Something's Got a Hold on Me"	Julie Mayaya	Etta James
5.	"Somewhere Over the Rainbow"	Imre Vízi	Judy Garland; Israel Kamakawiwoʻole
6.	"Caruso"	Mihai Chițu	Lucio Dalla
7.	"I Want to Know What Love Is"	Anthony Icuagu	Foreigner
8.	"Kiss from a Rose"	Sebastian Muntean	Seal
9.	"Oameni"	Cristian Sanda	Aurelian Andreescu
10.	"Are You Gonna Be My Girl"	Loredana Căvășdan	Jet
11.	"Crazy"	Robert Patai	Gnarls Barkley
12.	"I Want to Break Free"	Cătălin Dobre	Queen
13.	"Killing Me Softly"	Sânziana Niculae	Lori Lieberman; Fugees
14.	"Loucura"	Adrian Nour	Mariza
15.	"Papa Was a Rollin' Stone"	Angelo Simonică	The Temptations
16.	"I'm like a Bird"	Oana Brutaru	Nelly Furtado
17.	"Unchained Melody"	Dragoș Chircu	Todd Duncan; The Righteous Brothers
18.	"Spune-mi"	Iuliana Pușchilă	Monica Anghel
19.	"Rhythm of My Heart"	Marius Marin	Rod Stewart
20.	"Valerie"	Aminda	The Zutons; Mark Ronson and Amy Winehouse
21.	"Cerul"	David Bryan	Proconsul

== Awards and nominations ==
Year	Award	Category	Result	Source
2011	TVmania Awards	Best Talent Show	Won	
2012	Premiile Radar de Media	Best Television Show	Won	
2012	TVmania Awards	Best Talent Show	Won	
2013	Radar de Media Awards	Best Television Show	Won	
2013	TVmania Awards	Best Talent Show	Won	
2014	Radar de Media Awards	Best Entertainment Show	Won	
2014	TVmania Awards	Best Talent Show	Won	
2015	Radar de Media Awards	Best Entertainment Show	Nominated	
2015	Gala Eva.ro	Best Talent Show	Won	
2016	Radar de Media Awards	Best Entertainment Show	Nominated	
2016	TVmania Awards	Best Talent Show	Won	
2017	Radar de Media Awards	Best Entertainment Show	Nominated	
2017	Gala Eva.ro	Best Talent Show	Won	
2017	TVmania Awards	Best Talent Show	Won	
2018	TVmania Awards	Best Talent Show	Won	
2018	Radar de Media Awards	Best Entertainment Show	Nominated	

== See also ==
- The Voice (TV series)
- List of Romanian television series
