= Julie Mayaya =

Romanian singer (born 1986)

- Born: Julie Mayaya Nzal A Nka; 17 February 1986 (age 40); Iași, Romania
- Genres: Blues, soul, jazz
- Occupation: Singer
- Instrument: Vocals
- Years active: 2002–present

Julie Mayaya Nzal A Nka (born 17 February 1986 in Iași) is a Romanian singer. She took part in the second season of Pro TV's The Voice and was crowned the winner on 26 December 2012, becoming the first female contestant to win. Julie is of Congolese descent through her father.

Since her part in The Voice, she started a new project and started participating in the 12th season of the TV Show "Te cunosc de undeva". Julie said "I'm sure that this experience will test my limits and from witch I will learn a lot. It scares me the fact that I will have to use contact lenses. That because I have never used, and I know that my eyes are sensitive. It also scares me because i have to give up my long daring nails, and I know that my Afro hair will be a real challenge for the stylists"

Julie was also chosen by Disney to dub a muse in the animated movie Hercules, and to sing the opening theme in Romanian from the well-known movie The Lion King in 2019.

== Performances on The Voice of Romania ==
Mayayas performed the following songs on The Voice of Romania:

Number	Song	Original artist	Show	Result
1	„Hurt”	Christina Aguilera	The Blind Auditions Part 4	Advanced
2	„Black or White" Duet with Ovidiu Lazăr	Michael Jackson	The Battles, Part 3	Advanced
3	„Ochii tăi”	Elena Cârstea	Live show 2	Bottom two
4	„Something's Got a Hold on Me”	Etta James	Live show 3	Safe
5	„(You Make Me Feel Like) A Natural Woman”	Aretha Franklin	Semi-final	Safe
6	„Freedom! '90" Duet with Irina Tănase	George Michael	Semi-final	Safe
7	„Je t'aime”	Lara Fabian	Final	Won
8	Mash-up Duet with Andi Moisescu		Final	Won
8	„Vânzătoarea de plăceri”	Nelu Ploieșteanu	Final	Won
8	„Fetițele din București”	Gică Petrescu	Final	Won
8	„Suflet candriu de papugiu”	Gică Petrescu	Final	Won
8	„Sanie cu zurgălăi”		Final	Won
8	„Strada speranței”	Corina Chiriac	Final	Won
8	„Morărița”		Final	Won
8	„O lume minunată”	Mihai Constantinescu	Final	Won
9	„Cose della vita – Can't Stop Thinking of You" Duet with Horia Brenciu	Eros Ramazzotti and Tina Turner	Final	Won

Her debut single, "Stay", entered at number No. 75 on the Romanian Top 100.

Awards and achievements
Preceded by Ștefan Stan	The Voice of Romania; Winner; 2012	Succeeded by Mihai Chițu
