= Theo Rose =

Romanian actress, singer, television presenter (born 1997)

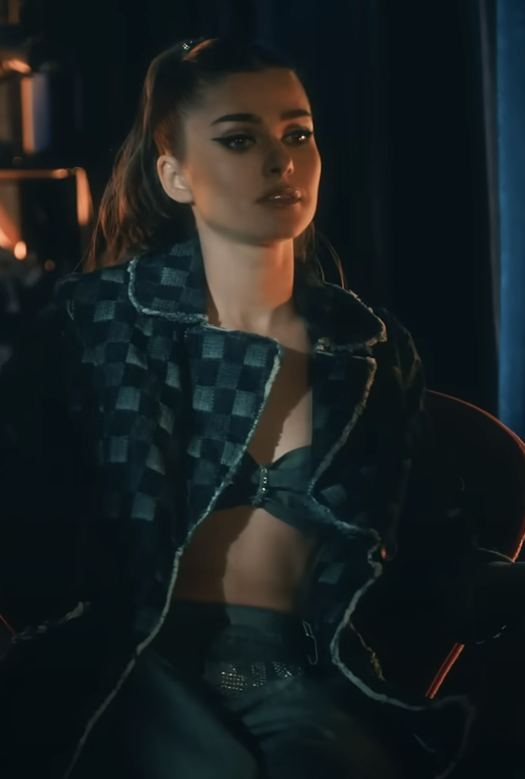

Background information
- Born: Theodora Maria Diaconu; August 8, 1997 (age 28); Ploiești, Romania
- Genres: Pop
- Occupations: Singer; actress; television presenter
- Years active: 2013–present
- Labels: Cat Music; HaHaHa Production; Roton; Global Records; Mixton Music Studio; Big Up Music
- Spouse: Anghel Damian (m. 2024)
- Website

Theodora Maria Diaconu (born August 8, 1997) is a Romanian actress, singer and television presenter.

She is known for being one of the judges on Vocea României (2022–2025). Two of her songs reached number one on the main Romanian charts in 2022 and 2024. Rose also featured in the Romanian television series Clanul (2022–2024), where she played one of the main characters.

== Early life, education, and early career ==
Theodora Maria Diaconu was born on August 8, 1997, and her ID shows as place of birth Ploiești, Romania. She has a brother, who is five years older than her and works at an antique store; and a sister, who also works in the music industry, singing mostly Romanian traditional music and being a presenter of a folklore show.

She is originally from Izvoarele, a village about 40 km near the county's capital. Her father is a football coach and director of the Izvoarele Cultural Center, while her mother is a secretary at the town hall in the village.

Rose started singing at the age of four and debuted on stage singing Romanian traditional music, being appreciated by the public and music professionals, obtaining some prizes at various local folk-music competitions. At the casting for the TVR1's children song show Ploaia steluțelor, Valeriu Lazarov encouraged her to shift to pop music. From the age of eleven, she truly discovered her passion for pop music, being appreciated by the public and music professionals, obtaining numerous prizes and trophies at various competitions.

Subsequently, she went to live in Bucharest at age fourteen, where, with the support of her sister, attended The Dinu Lipatti High School of Music, majoring in music pedagogy. Wanting to pursue a career in acting, she studied for a year to audition at I. L. Caragiale National University of Theatre and Film (UNATC), but instead was forced to enroll at Spiru Haret University. However, the acting section of that university was abolished due to the lack of candidates, so Rose decided to shift to the music department at the same university, where she took the bachelor exam and graduated.

=== Music career ===
Rose launched her first single at age sixteen in 2013. She achieved musical recognition in 2022 with her and Andrei Bănuță's song "Spune-i mama", which was number one for a week in Billboard's Romania Songs at the end of March. Romania Songs is part of Billboard's Hits of the World collection and is based on streaming and digital sales. The song reached first place in the first twenty-four hours since release in the Romanian YouTube Trending Music top and fifth place in the YouTube top of the best international songs.

In April 2024, her song Noaptea ne fură iubiri, feat. Andrei Ursu, was number one for three weeks in the UPFR charts, which measures the most-broadcast songs on radio stations and television channels throughout Romania.

=== Television ===
Rose became known to the general public at Kanal D, co-presenting the show KIDSing in 2014, alongside Dan Bordeianu. This was a talent show for children, ages six to thirteen, with Antonia, Gabriel Cotabiţă and Wilmark as judges.

In the summer of 2017, Rose was one of the three show hosts, with Pepe and Dorian Popa, of the pool show Gashka mare, which was filmed in the Divertiland water park and aired from Monday to Friday, from 17.00 local time.

In 2020, she participated in the Romanian television show Bravo, ai stil! – Celebrities version, reaching the final, where she took second place, after being defeated by Alexandra Ungureanu, who obtained 50.3 percent of the votes, with Theo having 49.7 percent. This was a reality competition show, similar to İşte Benim Stilim, where contestants had to compete each week and come up with a different outfit to get points for their style.

In 2021, Rose hosted the show SuperStar România, a talent show with Smiley, Raluka, Marius Moga and Carla's Dreams as judges.

From the tenth season onward of the talent show Vocea României, a competition similar to The Voice, she became one of the judges, sharing a seat with Smiley (as a duo). In the eleventh season, she shared the double chair with Horia Brenciu.

From the summer of 2022, she started her acting career, by playing one of the main characters on Clanul television series, as the daughter, Vera Maximilian, of a Romanian mobster, which she played for four seasons until her character was shot and died. She also performed, alongside IAN, a Romanian trapper, in the official theme song of the television series. The television series was about the fight between the mafia and the police.

== Personal life ==
Rose had a relationship for over five years with economist Alex Leonte, nephew of the Romanian television presenter Nea Mărin, and they were living together when she started to become famous. However, in the summer of 2022, they separated and the singer started dating the actor Anghel Damian.

She became pregnant a few months later with a boy and on June 13, 2023, gave birth to him through C-section. The couple eloped at the end of September 2024.

== Discography ==
=== Singles ===
| Title | Year | Peak chart positions |
|---|---|---|
| Diamonds & Pearls (feat. Jester) | 2013 | |
| Pe bune | 2014 | |
| Te quiero | 2014 | |
| Iarna în doi | 2015 | |
| Awella | 2015 | |
| Aprinde luna | 2016 | |
| Te urăsc cu toată dragostea (feat. Alama) | 2017 | |
| Latino gang (colab. with Boier Bibescu, Alessandra, Anuryh) | 2018 | |
| Nu mai știi ce vrei (feat. Rashid) | 2021 | |
| Toată România (feat. OG Eastbull) | 2021 | |
| Dragostea (feat. Jador) | 2021 | |
| Roata (feat. Damian & Brothers) | 2021 | |
| Căsuța noastră (feat. Nosfe) | 2021 | |
| Fructul interzis (feat. Cabron) | 2022 | |
| Spune-i mama (feat. Andrei Bănuță) | 2022 | 1 |
| Noaptea ne fură iubiri (feat. Andrei Ursu) | 2024 | 1 |

== See also ==
- List of Romanian actors
- List of Romanian singers
