= Dascălu =

Dascălu may refer to:

- Dascălu, Ilfov, a commune in Ilfov County, Romania
- Balta Dascălului, a tributary of the river Olteț in Romania
- Alexandra Dascalu, French volleyballer
- Mihaela Dascălu, retired Romanian speed skater
