= Ștefan Stan =

Romanian singer (born 1977)

Stefan Stan
- Born: Ștefan Alexandru Stan; 2 July 1977 (age 49); Bucharest, Romania
- Genres: Blues, soul, jazz
- Occupation: Singer
- Instrument: Voice
- Years active: 2011–present
- Label: Universal Music Romania

Ștefan Stan (born 2 July 1977 in Bucharest, Romania) is a Romanian singer and the winner of the first season of Romanian reality talent show Vocea României 2011. Musically, he approaches the blues genre.

== Early life ==
Although his mother had a musical background and Stan's desire to become a singer, he has not had the support of any of his parents regarding the pursuing of a music career. Because of financial difficulties, he had to start working in construction at the age of sixteen, and later in a factory for air conditioning. He left for the U.S. to work, and encouraged by his friends he sang in various cafés and bars. In 2011 Ștefan joined the pre-selection for Voice of Romania, where he was mentored by Smiley. During the competition he was noted by his voice "baritone, rough and slightly throaty", and on December 26 was named overall winner of the show. For winning Ștefan received $100,000 and a management contract with Universal Music Romania.

Starting September 13, 2013 he became presenter of the TV show "Killer Karaoke" on Prima TV.

== Discography ==
- You Give Me Love – with Alex Velea (2012), # 61 in Romanian Top 100.
- Ea nu mai vine
- Zbor prin nori
- Hipnotizantă
- Leaving You
- Bârfitoarele
- I've Been Down
- I Don't Wanna Feel It
- Domnișoara
- Un om simplu
- Ne iubim
- Breathe feat. Teddy
- A cazut din rai
- Lullaby
- Asadar
- Romania, Te Iubesc! – Stefan Stan feat. Dumitru Fărcaș
- Viata
- Orice, oricand
- Doar tu

Awards and achievements
Preceded by N/A	The Voice of Romania; Winner; 2011	Succeeded by Julie Mayaya
