= Gică Petrescu =

Romanian composer and musician

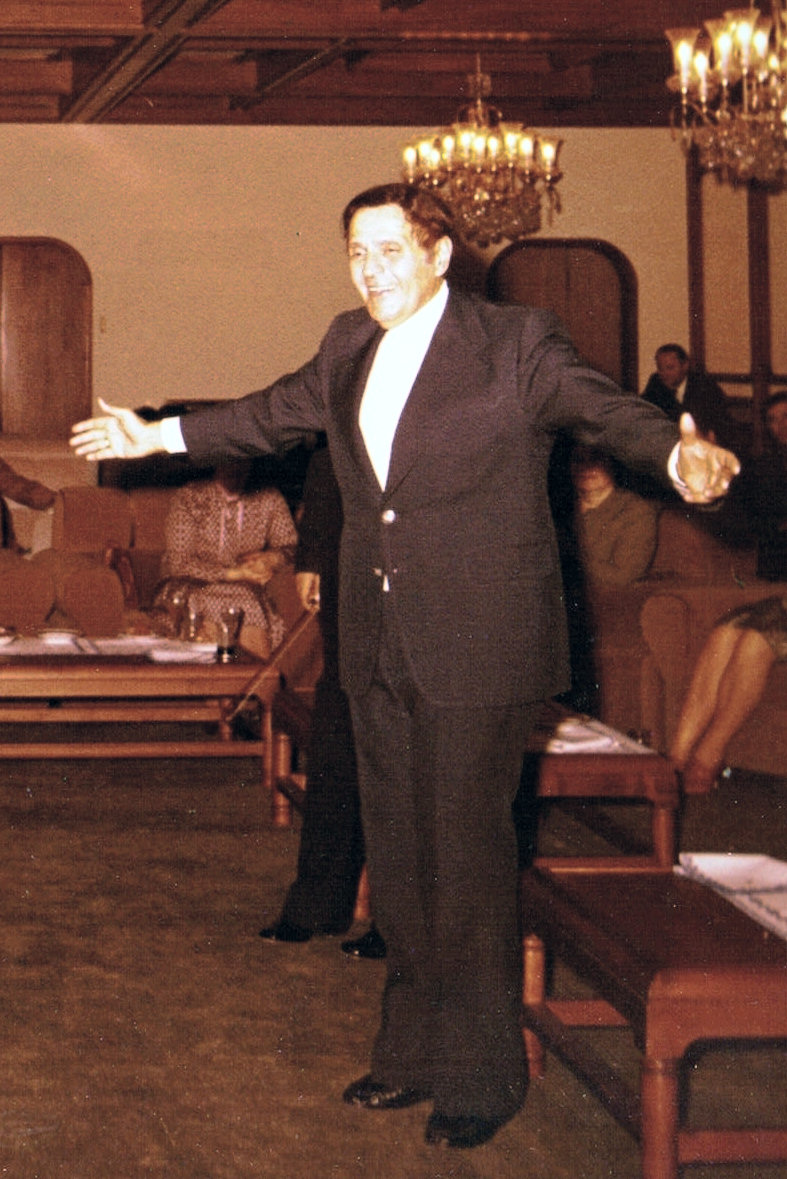

Background information
- Born: 2 April 1915; Bucharest, Kingdom of Romania
- Died: 18 June 2006 (aged 91) Bucharest, Romania
- Genres: Light music
- Years active: 1937–2006
- Labels: Electrecord
- Spouse: Cezarina Moldoveanu

Gică Petrescu (Romanian pronunciation: [ˈd͡ʒikə peˈtresku]; 2 April 1915 – 18 June 2006) was a prolific Romanian folk music composer and performer.

Born in Bucharest, he made his debut at age 18 by joining a student band, having just graduated from the Gheorghe Șincai High School in his native city. His official debut was made by performing for radio audiences in 1937. Between 1937 and 1939, he carried on singing with the Radu Ghindă and Dinu Șerbănescu orchestras at the Sinaia Casino in the Carpathian Mountains.

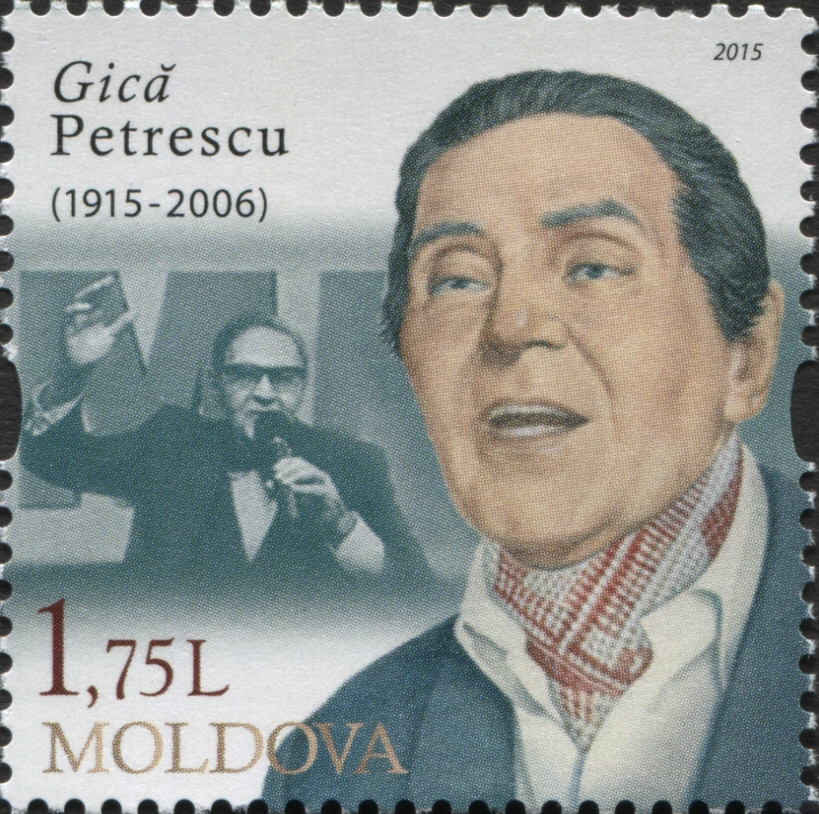
Moldovan stamp of Petrescu

Some music critics have compared his talent and public appeal to the likes of Frank Sinatra or Maurice Chevalier. His showmanship and charm were able to attract audiences of all ages, while his music influences combine folk with classical orchestra arrangements. He holds the record for the number of most original (composed and performed) songs (over 1,500), in an amazingly varied discography, many of which became national hits and which were covered again and again by other Romanian artists. Some of those hits are:

- Căsuța noastră (Our Little House)
- București, București (Bucharest, Bucharest)
- Dă-i cu șprițul pân' la ziuă (Drink Spritz Until Daylight)
- Du-mă acasă, măi tramvai (Take Me Home, Tram)
- Uite-așa aș vrea să mor (Look, This Is How I'd Like To Die), in which the Obor neighborhood is referenced; the artist playfully expresses his desire to be buried in a tavern in the area, with a glass of red wine in hand.

In 1968, he was awarded the Order of Cultural Merit, second class. On 5 May 2003, then-President Ion Iliescu appointed Gică Petrescu as a Knight of the Order of the Star of Romania, as he celebrated his 88th birthday. On 18 June 2006, he was due to receive the national award "Premiile muzicale Radio România Actualități" (Musical Awards of Radio Romania News). The award was canceled, as he had died that very morning. He was 91 years old. He was buried in Bucharest's Bellu Cemetery.
