= Nicoleta Luciu =

Romanian actress (born 1980)

- Born: Nicoleta Lucia Luciu; 12 September 1980 (age 46); Bucharest, Romania
- Modelling information
- Hair colour: Brown
- Eye colour: Brown
- Website: www.nicoletaluciu.ro

Nicoleta Lucia Luciu (Romanian pronunciation: [nikoˈleta ˈlutʃi.a ˈlutʃju]; born 12 September 1980, Bucharest) is a Romanian actress, singer and television host.

After she won the Miss Romania contest in 1999, she began to appear in different magazines: Playboy, Iveco, Vivre, Pro TV Magazin, TV Mania etc. In 2012, she became a co-presenter of The Voice of Romania.

In 2014 Warner Bros Animation chose the celebrity to dub in Romanian Wonder Woman in the animated movie The Lego Movie.
