= Dalma Kovács =

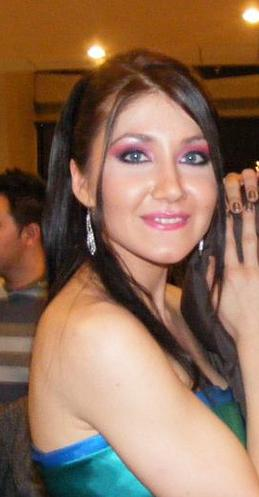
- Dalma in 2009

Background information
- Also known as: Dalma
- Born: Dalma Kovács; 18 May 1985 (age 41); Brașov, Romania
- Genres: Pop, jazz
- Occupations: Singer, actress
- Instruments: Guitar, piano
- Years active: 2001–present
- Website: www.dalma.ro (in Romanian) www.myspace.com/dalmakovacs (in Romanian)

Dalma (Romanian pronunciation: [ˈdalma]) (born Dalma Kovács; 18 May 1985 in Brașov) is a Romanian pop/jazz singer and occasional television actress of Hungarian descent. Dalma became well known in Romania after she became the winner of TVR 1's show "Faimoșii" in 2007, but mostly after she qualified in the Romanian national final of Eurovision Song Contest 2009 with the song Love Was Never Her Friend, composed by Romanian composer Marius Moga, and placed sixth in the big finale. Even if the song did not get the first place, it received considerable airplay in Romania. Because she is popular in her country, Dalma received an offer from Walt Disney Pictures and provides the singing voice of Elsa in the Romanian dubbed version of Frozen, and she was the lead singer of the main theme song from the movie Tinker Bell and the Legend of the NeverBeast.

== Biography ==
=== 1985–2009: Early life and career ===
Dalma Kovács was born to ethnic Hungarian parents and raised along with her brother, Győző, in Brașov. At an early age, Dalma developed an interest in a wide range of musical styles, closely studying many female singers' vocal techniques, like Whitney Houston, Christina Aguilera, Celine Dion, Mariah Carey, Shania Twain and Ella Fitzgerald.

Her mother, Melania Kovács, wanted Dalma and Győző go to a private school and take vocal lessons. She attended Şcoala Populară de Artă in Brașov between 2000 and 2003. During this time, she was the leading voice in a pop-rock band named Vertigo. They had concerts in several cities in Romania: Brașov, Ploiești, Constanța, Mediaș, Medgidia, Târgoviște, Râșnov. As a teenager, Dalma participated in several local and international music contests, where she achieved good results. For about two years after graduating in 2003, she sang only jazz, studying many jazz singers and having several concerts with her jazz band in Brașov.

In December 2005, Dalma visited the United States for the first time, spending six weeks in San Francisco. During her stay, she gave a jazz concert at the Forest Hill Club where composer Candace Forest was invited. She was so amazed by Dalma's voice that she decided to give her a role in the chamber musical she was about to produce in May 2006, called: Viva Concha! Rose of the Presidio.

Since the autumn of 2007, she has been a member of the group Divertis, Antena 1, currently on the Pro TV Channel. In the show she is both a singer and an actress, mostly in the role of a Hungarian citizen who lives in Romania.

At the end of 2008, she toured Romania as a background singer of the band Simplu, having a solo moment in the show with a song composed by Marius Moga especially for that tour.

=== 2009–present: Eurovision participations and debut studio album ===
Dalma took part in the Romanian final of the Eurovision Song Contest 2009, with the jazz song "Love Was Never Her Friend", and placed 6th in the big final. In the fall of 2009, Dalma participated at the Mamaia Music Festival with the song "Cine-ți cântă?" (en. "Who Sings You?"), written by Marius Moga, and ended up as second runner-up.

In early 2010, she entered the final of the national selection for the Eurovision Song Contest 2010, but lost to "Playing with Fire" by Paula Seling and Ovi. Even so, her song, "I'm Running", became a viral hit and some fans claimed that the voting was corrupted by TVR.

At the same time, she released her first ever radio single, entitled "Lovely Nerd" (or Love Me Sweet) which did not become a hit, never making the Romanian Top 100, but it was broadcast by a few mainstream radio stations. The music video was shot in late 2009, and it premiered in early 2010. It has been broadcast by MTV Romania and 1 Music Channel, but neither of the music stations added it to their playlist. Since then, Dalma has appeared in several Romanian TV shows to promote herself and her forthcoming untitled album, which is to be released in 2011.

In November 2010, Dalma entered the track "Song for Him" for the Eurovision Song Contest 2011 and it passed the pre-selection stage, entering the Romanian national final on the New Year's Eve, on 31 December. The song had country music influences and finished 11th on Selecția Națională 2011.

== Awards and nominations ==
This list includes the achievements, nominations and awards of pop/jazz artist, Dalma Kovács:

Year	Type	Award	Result
2003	Brașov "Gaudeamus" Contest	Record of the contest (as the leading singer of the Vertigo group)	3rd place
2004	Brașov "Gaudeamus" Contest	Best Vocal Performance	2nd place
2004	Arad "Pop Star" Contest	Best Vocal Performance	Won
2006	Brașov "Joy Art" Festival	Best Vocal Performance	Won
2006	Miercurea Ciuc "Médiabefutó" Contest	Public's Favourite Artist	Won
2007	"Faimoșii" Contest		Won
2009	Romania National Eurovision Song Contest	Representing Romania at ESC 2009	6th place
2010	Romania National Eurovision Song Contest	Representing Romania at ESC 2010	11th place
2011	Romania National Eurovision Song Contest	Representing Romania at ESC 2011	11th place
