= Horia Brenciu =

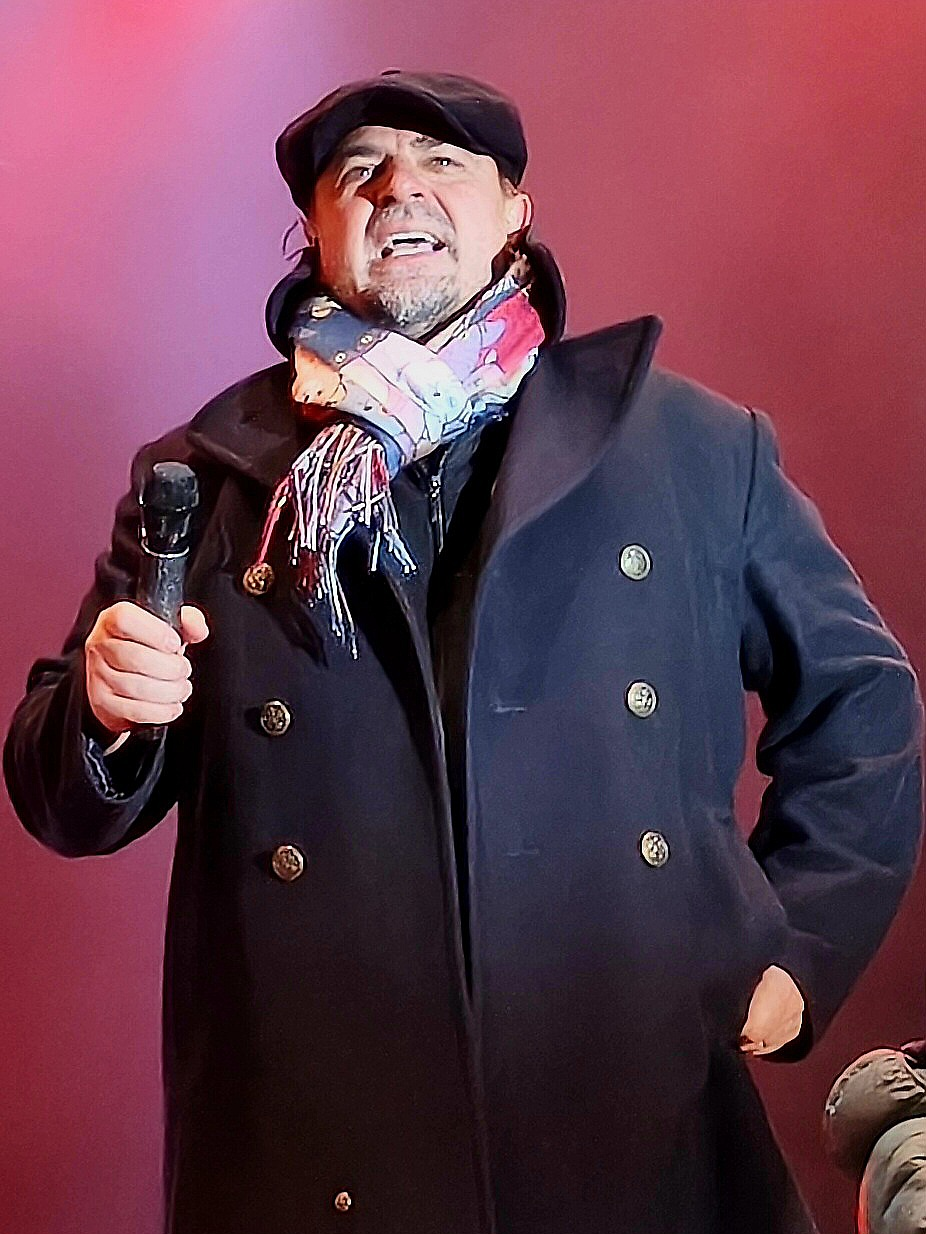
- Horia Brenciu at the 2025 edition of Bucharest Christmas Market

Background information
- Also known as: Brenciu
- Born: Horea Augustus Brenciu; 27 August 1972 (age 53); Brașov, Romania
- Genres: Pop, funk, rock, blues, jazz, swing
- Occupations: Singer, actor, entertainer, TV Host
- Years active: 1990–present
- Labels: Cat Music, MediaPro Music, HB Media Entertainment
- Website: horiabrenciu.ro
- Horia Brenciu - "O zi din viața ta" YouTube

Horia Brenciu (Romanian pronunciation: [ˈhori.a ˈbrent͡ʃʲu]; born Horea Augustus Brenciu [ˈhore̯a awˈɡustus] on 27 August 1972 in Brașov) is a Romanian singer, television host for the Romanian version of Dancing with the Stars, entertainer, and philanthropist. He studied at Andrei Șaguna National College in Brașov, then continued his education at the Brașov School of Popular Arts, taking piano and canto classes, and graduated from the Theatre Academy in Bucharest in 1998.

== Career ==
At 18 years old, he started his musical career by playing the piano in his own band, "Apropo". In 1993, he entered into the world of television as the host for a popular show, at that time called Robingo, on TVR. In the following years, he was a prominent TV presenter, and he was the host of several kids' shows, such as TIP TOP MINITOP and KIKI RIKI MIKI (1998–2001). In 2002, he created one of the most important brands in Romania, HB Media, and from 2004 to 2010, he was the planner of Stars on Marriott and other popular shows for New Year's Eve. From 2003, he made a stand by creating "Cabaret Nights at Hilton", cabaret shows which have been enjoyed by international stars and some Romanian celebrities.

In 2002, Horia Brenciu founded the HB Orchestra, a long-standing project that has actively supported many artists in Romania, primarily in the background. Another project with thousands of concerts and live acts, presently held with Julie Mayaya (the winner from season 2 of Vocea României), can be watched at Antena 1 in the show Serviciul Român de Comedie. In 2007, Brenciu released his first album, 35, and in 2008, he received some awards from Radio Romania International in "The best male voice" category.

In 1997, Walt Disney Pictures Romania chose the artist to sing the main theme of the animated series Aladdin. Brenciu also dubbed characters in animations and films such as the film Happy Feet Two.

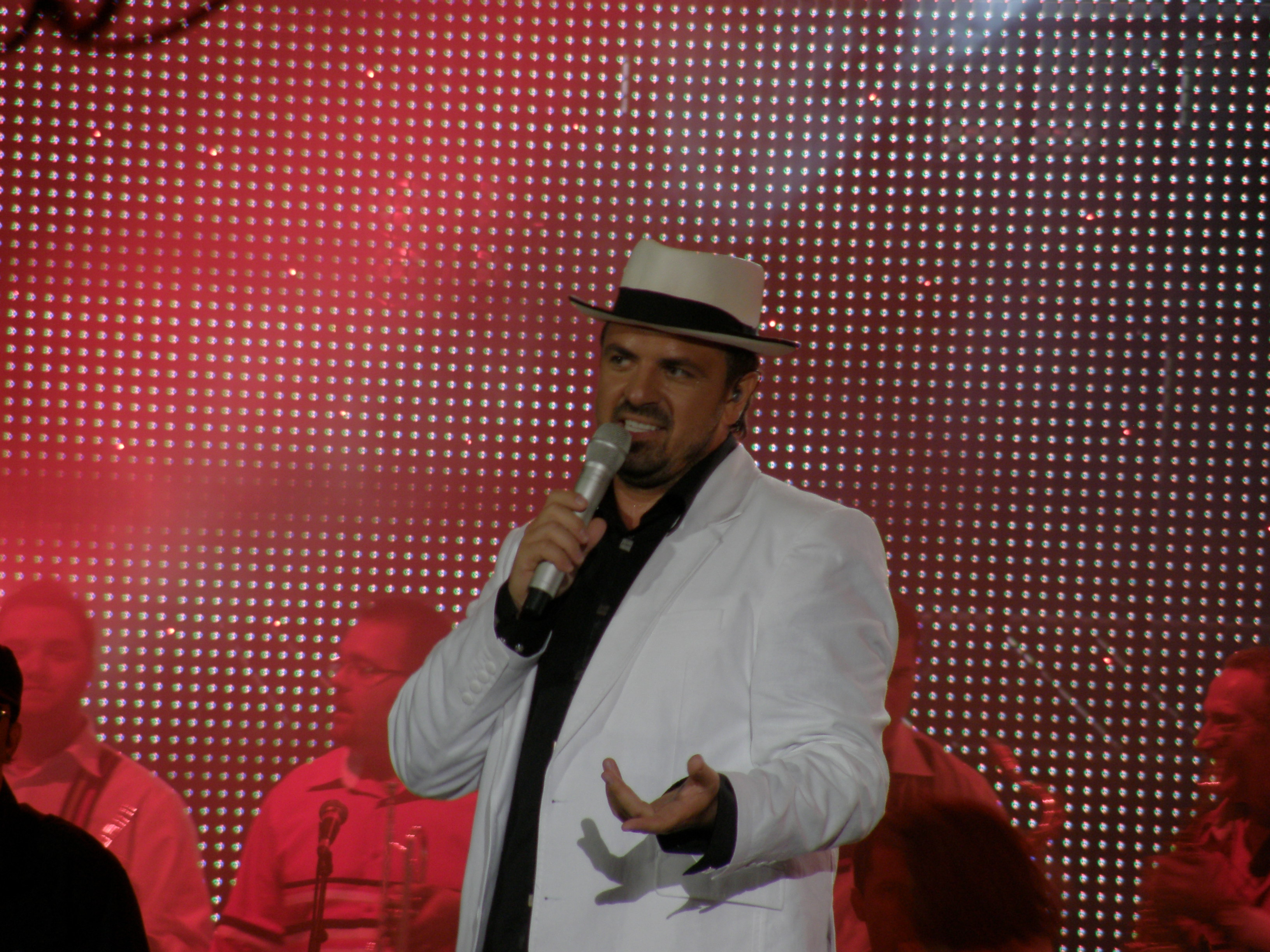
Horia Brenciu at the Golden Stag Festival in 2008

== TV shows ==
- Robingo
- Tip Top Minitop
- Kiki Riki Miki
- Ora 6 fix
- Sarabanda
- Național TV Bingo Liberty
- Neața
- Neața în Epoca de piatră
- Gong Show
- Înfruntarea
- Asul din Mânecă
- Vocea României (coach) (seasons 1–3, 9, 11–)
- Te cunosc de undeva! (judge) (season 5)
- X Factor (judge) (seasons 4–8)
- Masked Singer România (judge) (seasons 1–2)

== Songs ==
- "Funky Party"
- "Cine ești tu?"
- "La la la"
- "Lucruri simple"
- "La radio"
- "La fel"
- "Septembrie, luni"
- "It's you" (feat. Kamara)
- "Close to me"
- "Love is..." (feat. Cristi Cretu)
- "Prolog"
- "Hello"
- "Sunt cine vreau să fiu"
- "O nouă zi"
- "Do what you like"
- "Tu"
