= Vocea României season 4 =

Vocea României
- Season 4
- Hosted by: Pavel Bartoș
- Coaches: Tudor Chirilă; Loredana Groza; Smiley; Marius Moga
- Winner: Tiberiu Albu
- Winning coach: Tudor Chirilă
- Runner-up: Anda Dimitriu
- No. of episodes: 15

Release
- Original network: ProTV
- Original release: September 16 – December 19, 2014

Season chronology
- ← Previous; Season 3 Next → Season 5

The fourth season of the Romanian reality talent show Vocea României premiered on ProTV on September 16, 2014. Pavel Bartoș returned as host, while Nicoleta Luciu left the show. Oana Tache replaced Vlad Roșca as the social media correspondent. Loredana Groza, Smiley and Marius Moga returned as coaches, while Tudor Chirilă replaced Horia Brenciu as the fourth coach. The show was moved from its usual Saturday evening slot to Friday evening, with the premiere on a Tuesday.

This season introduced several rule changes. The blind auditions were extended from six to seven episodes. The battle rounds were simplified by permitting coaches to steal only one losing contestant, rather than two as in the previous season, and by removing the sing-off. Consequently, each coach advances with eight contestants to the live shows, mirroring the format of Season Three. Additionally, the jury/televote split in the semi-final was adjusted from 50/50 to 40/60.

The season finale aired on December 19, 2014. Tiberiu Albu, initially mentored by Smiley, but stolen by Chirilă in the battle rounds, was declared winner of the season. It was Chirilă's first victory as a coach and the first time a stolen contestant had won the competition.

== Overview ==
=== Early decisions ===
In March 2014, ProTV announced their intention to turn season 4 into a children's competition, according to The Voice Kids format, but they changed their minds a month later and decided to have a competition for people ages 16 and up, as in previous years.

ProTV also revamped the set of the show and used better sound equipment compared to previous seasons.

=== Personnel changes ===
Former coach Horia Brenciu left the show and was replaced with Tudor Chirilă.

Former producer Mona Segall resigned from the MediaPro trust in April 2014 and moved to the rival channel Antena 1, together with her entire team. The orchestra led by George Natsis followed them, stating that they wanted to continue working together. These decisions came in the context of a controversial series of dismissals and resignations from the media trust at the beginning of 2014, influenced by changes made by the then-newly appointed CEO of ProTV, Aleksandras Česnavičius, who was implementing a cost-saving strategy.

The fourth season of the show was produced by an international team co-ordinated by Peter Majeský and Melanie Triebel, who had previously worked on German, Czech and Slovak television productions.

The dance crew of the show, led by Edi Stancu, also migrated to Antena 1, and was replaced by the newly formed PRO Dance Crew, led by Emil Rengle.

Oana Tache replaced Vlad Roșca as the social media correspondent.

== Teams ==
Color key

- Winner
- Runner-up
- Third place
- Fourth place
- Eliminated in the live shows
- Artist was stolen by another coach
- Eliminated in the battle rounds

| Coaches | Top 56 artists | | | | |
|---|---|---|---|---|---|
| Tudor Chirilă | | | | | |
| Tudor Chirilă | Tiberiu Albu | Ligia Hojda | Ivana Farc | Andreea Avarvari | Petra Acker |
| Tudor Chirilă | Tudor Man | Florin Ciotlăuș | Iulia Ferchiu | ~~Larisa Mihăeș~~ | ~~Anca Petcu~~ |
| Tudor Chirilă | Ana Maria Andrei | Bebe Panait | Elena Javelea | Matei Chioariu | Ruben Ciungan |
| Marius Moga | | | | | |
| Marius Moga | Anda Dimitriu | Brigitta Balogh | Claudiu Rusu | Alexandru Bunghez | Alina Dogaru |
| Marius Moga | Florian Rus | Ioan Bîgea | Maria Constantin | Diana Bucșa | Caroline Schally |
| Marius Moga | Eliza Manda | Alexandra Bărăceanu | Marina Velle | Radu Mitrea | Florentina Mihai |
| Loredana Groza | | | | | |
| Loredana Groza | Maria Hojda | Ilinca Băcilă | Larisa Mihăeș | Andrei Cheteleș | Florin Răduță |
| Loredana Groza | Ioana Satmari | Lucian Colareza | Valentin Uzun | Roberta Radu | Diana Popa |
| Loredana Groza | Tatiana Heghea | Botond Surányi | Angela Vescu | Bianca Ioniță | Raluca Albu |
| Smiley | | | | | |
| Smiley | Aliona Munteanu | Gelu Graur | Maria Șimandi | Vladimir Pocorschi | Anca Petcu |
| Smiley | Fabian Sasu | Alina Anușca | Alin Gheorghișan | ~~Claudiu Rusu~~ | ~~Tiberiu Albu~~ |
| Smiley | Robert Costin | Emilia Mușală | Ana Maria Georgescu | Cosmin Dragomir | Andrei Bălăceanu |
Note: Italicized names are stolen contestants (names struck through within former teams).

== Blind auditions ==
The first phase of the competition, the blind auditions, taped August 19–21 and 26–27, 2014 at the MediaPro Studios, Buftea, began airing when the season premiered on September 16, 2014.

Color key

| ✔ | Coach hit his/her "I WANT YOU" button |
| | Artist defaulted to this coach's team |
| | Artist elected to join this coach's team |
| | Artist eliminated with no coach pressing his or her "I WANT YOU" button |

=== Episode 1 (September 16) ===
The first of seven pre-recorded audition episodes aired on Tuesday, September 16, 2014. The four coaches opened the show with a medley of their songs:

| Order | Main vocalist | Song |
|---|---|---|
| 1 | Marius Moga | "Perfect fără tine" |
| 2 | Loredana Groza | "Pe barba mea" |
| 3 | Smiley | "Extravaganza" |
| 4 | Tudor Chirilă | "Acasă" |

The contestants featured in this episode were:

| Order | Artist | Age | Hometown | Song | Coach's and contestant's choices | | | |
| Order | Artist | Age | Hometown | Song | Tudor | Loredana | Smiley | Moga |
|---|---|---|---|---|---|---|---|---|
| 1 | Florin Răduță | 20 | Târgoviște, Dâmbovița | "When a Man Loves a Woman" | ✔ | ✔ | ✔ | ✔ |
| 2 | Ana Maria Georgescu | 27 | Oradea, Bihor | "Je t'aime" | ✔ | — | ✔ | ✔ |
| 3 | Ilinca Băcilă | 16 | Cluj-Napoca, Cluj | "I Want to Be a Cowboy's Sweetheart" | — | ✔ | ✔ | ✔ |
| 4 | Alexandru Bunghez | 20 | Drobeta-Turnu Severin, Mehedinți | "Sex on Fire" | ✔ | — | ✔ | ✔ |
| 5 | Radu Bogdan Bor | 28 | Cluj-Napoca Cluj | "Wake Me Up!" | — | — | — | — |
| 6 | Alin Gheorghișan | 33 | Bucharest | "Let's Stay Together" | ✔ | — | ✔ | ✔ |
| 7 | Marina Velle | 33 | Bucharest | "Waiting All Night" | — | ✔ | — | ✔ |
| 8 | Aurica Cristina Chireac | 52 | Bucharest | "(You Make Me Feel Like) A Natural Woman" | — | — | — | — |
| 9 | Ioan Bîgea | 21 | Bârlad, Vaslui | "It's a Man's Man's Man's World" | ✔ | ✔ | ✔ | ✔ |
| 10 | Cristina Gabriela Dobrescu | 25 | Constanța, Constanța | "Survivor" | — | — | — | — |
| 11 | Iulia Ferchiu | 21 | Satu Mare, Satu Mare | "Summertime" | ✔ | ✔ | ✔ | ✔ |

=== Episode 2 (September 19) ===
The second episode aired on Friday, September 19, 2014.

| Order | Artist | Age | Hometown | Song | Coach's and contestant's choices | | | |
| Order | Artist | Age | Hometown | Song | Tudor | Loredana | Smiley | Moga |
|---|---|---|---|---|---|---|---|---|
| 1 | Ivana Farc | 17 | Oradea, Bihor | "Raggamuffin" | ✔ | ✔ | ✔ | ✔ |
| 2 | Gelu Graur | 34 | Botoșani, Botoșani | "Roxanne" | ✔ | ✔ | ✔ | ✔ |
| 3 | Alexandra Bărăceanu | 19 | Deva, Hunedoara | "I'd Rather Go Blind" | — | ✔ | ✔ | ✔ |
| 4 | Valentin Uzun | 28 | Chișinău, Moldova | "Gas Gas" | — | ✔ | — | — |
| 5 | Ana Maria Andrei | 22 | Botoșani, Botoșani | "Stay" | ✔ | — | — | — |
| 6 | Irina Ceban | 26 | Chișinău, Moldova | "Stop!" | — | — | — | — |
| 7 | Vladimir Pocorschi | 28 | Bucharest | "Rebel Yell" | ✔ | ✔ | ✔ | ✔ |
| 8 | Constantin Valentin Mircea | 60 | Constanța, Constanța | "N'oubliez jamais" | — | — | — | — |
| 9 | Petra Acker | 27 | Brașov, Brașov | "Can't Take My Eyes Off You" | ✔ | — | ✔ | ✔ |
| 10 | Lucian Colareza | 26 | Constanța, Constanța | "Historia de un amor" | ✔ | ✔ | ✔ | ✔ |
| 11 | Florin Blaj | 49 | Bacău, Bacău | "Balada (Tchê Tcherere Tchê Tchê)" | — | — | — | — |
| 12 | Maria Șimandi | 17 | Aiud, Alba | "Chasing Pavements" | ✔ | ✔ | ✔ | ✔ |

=== Episode 3 (September 26) ===
The third episode aired on Friday, September 26, 2014.

| Order | Artist | Age | Hometown | Song | Coach's and contestant's choices | | | |
| Order | Artist | Age | Hometown | Song | Tudor | Loredana | Smiley | Moga |
|---|---|---|---|---|---|---|---|---|
| 1 | Florentina Mihai | 22 | Bucharest | "Set Fire to the Rain" | ✔ | — | ✔ | ✔ |
| 2 | Tiberiu Albu | 22 | Timișoara, Timiș | "I Love Rock 'n' Roll" | ✔ | ✔ | ✔ | ✔ |
| 3 | Ioana Ignat | 16 | Botoșani, Botoșani | "I Surrender" | — | — | — | — |
| 4 | Maria Constantin | 27 | Bucharest | "Sanie cu zurgălăi" / "Johnny, tu n'es pas un ange" | ✔ | — | ✔ | ✔ |
| 5 | Francesca Vescu | 20 | Chișinău, Moldova | "Caruso" | — | ✔ | — | — |
| 6 | Emmanouil Maroulis | 41 | Bucharest | "Ochii tăi" | — | — | — | — |
| 7 | Elena Javelea | 23 | Chișinău, Moldova | "You Can Leave Your Hat On" | ✔ | — | — | — |
| 8 | Ramona Anca Popa | 35 | Timișoara, Timiș | "It's a Man's Man's Man's World" | — | — | — | — |
| 9 | Florian Rus | 25 | Târgu Mureș, Mureș | "Locked Out of Heaven" | — | — | ✔ | ✔ |
| 10 | Ramona Pataki-Hașaș | 34 | Oradea, Bihor | "My Number One" | — | — | — | — |
| 11 | Aliona Munteanu | 25 | Chișinău, Moldova | "Halo" | — | — | ✔ | ✔ |
| 12 | Fabian Sasu | 32 | Bucharest | "No Woman, No Cry" | ✔ | — | ✔ | ✔ |
| 13 | Anca Petcu | 31 | Bucharest | "Dirty Diana" | ✔ | ✔ | — | — |

=== Episode 4 (October 3) ===
The fourth episode aired on October 3, 2014.

| Order | Artist | Age | Hometown | Song | Coach's and contestant's choices | | | |
| Order | Artist | Age | Hometown | Song | Tudor | Loredana | Smiley | Moga |
|---|---|---|---|---|---|---|---|---|
| 1 | Emilia Mușală | 31 | Bucharest | "I Will Always Love You" | ✔ | — | ✔ | — |
| 2 | Vlad Ioan Cirșan | 18 | Buziaș, Timiș | "Billie Jean" | — | — | — | — |
| 3 | Diana Popa | 23 | Chișinău, Moldova | "Candyman" | — | ✔ | — | — |
| 4 | Claudiu Palalae | 19 | Brașov, Brașov | "Perfect fără tine" | — | — | — | — |
| 5 | Alina Dogaru | 28 | Dorohoi, Botoșani | "Not That Kind" | ✔ | ✔ | ✔ | ✔ |
| 6 | Andrei Cheteleș | 25 | Cluj-Napoca, Cluj | "Feeling Good" | — | ✔ | — | — |
| 7 | Lina Bakutayan | 26 | Cluj-Napoca, Cluj | "Addicted to You" | — | — | — | — |
| 8 | Andreea Avarvari | 22 | Bucharest | "When Love Takes Over" | ✔ | — | — | — |
| 9 | Adrian Mazilu | 28 | Bucharest | "Mr. Brownstone" | — | — | — | — |
| 10 | Larisa Mihăeș | 17 | Roman, Neamț | "Dacă ploaia s-ar opri" | ✔ | ✔ | ✔ | ✔ |
| 11 | Roberta Radu | 19 | Negrești, Vaslui | "Temptation" | ✔ | ✔ | ✔ | — |
| 12 | Paula Crișan | 23 | Baia Mare, Maramureș | "The Best" | — | — | — | — |
| 13 | Brigitta Balogh | 25 | Oradea, Bihor | "Listen" | ✔ | ✔ | ✔ | ✔ |

=== Episode 5 (October 10) ===
The fifth episode was aired on October 10, 2014.

| Order | Artist | Age | Hometown | Song | Coach's and contestant's choices | | | |
| Order | Artist | Age | Hometown | Song | Tudor | Loredana | Smiley | Moga |
|---|---|---|---|---|---|---|---|---|
| 1 | Andrei Bălăceanu | 28 | Bucharest | "Save the Last Dance for Me" | ✔ | ✔ | ✔ | ✔ |
| 2 | Stela Botez | 24 | Chișinău, Moldova | "Hora din Moldova" | — | — | — | — |
| 3 | Bianca Ioniță | 16 | Moreni, Dâmbovița | "Hot Stuff" | — | ✔ | — | — |
| 4 | Victor Sîrbu | 24 | Soroca, Moldova | "Sex Bomb" | — | — | — | — |
| 5 | Eliza Manda | 27 | Bucharest | "Umbrella" | — | ✔ | — | ✔ |
| 6 | Corina Tudosean | 21 | Bucharest | "Dernière danse" | — | — | — | — |
| 7 | Ruben Ciungan | 19 | Aiud, Alba | "You Are So Beautiful" | ✔ | — | — | — |
| 8 | Lavinia Ioana Lăcătuș | 20 | Bucharest | "Ain't No Other Man" | — | — | — | — |
| 9 | Cosmin Dragomir | 25 | Focșani, Vrancea | "Hello" | — | — | ✔ | ✔ |
| 10 | Patricia Niri | 24 | Cluj-Napoca, Cluj | "I Try" | — | — | — | — |
| 11 | Raluca Albu | 30 | Denta, Timiș | "Crazy" | — | ✔ | — | — |
| 12 | Andrei Ceobanu | 27 | Rădăuți, Suceava | "Living Next Door to Alice" | — | — | — | — |
| 13 | Radu Mitrea | 21 | Bucharest | "I See Fire" | ✔ | — | — | ✔ |

=== Episode 6 (October 17) ===
The sixth episode was aired on October 17, 2014.

| Order | Artist | Age | Hometown | Song | Coach's and contestant's choices | | | |
| Order | Artist | Age | Hometown | Song | Tudor | Loredana | Smiley | Moga |
|---|---|---|---|---|---|---|---|---|
| 1 | Robert Costin | 36 | Bucharest | "You Raise Me Up" | — | — | ✔ | ✔ |
| 2 | Julia Dicu | 18 | Râmnicu Vâlcea, Vâlcea | "Hora din Moldova" | — | — | — | — |
| 3 | Matei Chioariu | 28 | Bucharest | "Long Train Runnin'" | ✔ | — | — | — |
| 4 | Anda Dimitriu | 26 | Bucharest | "Crazy" | ✔ | ✔ | ✔ | ✔ |
| 5 | Simion Caragia | 19 | Timișoara, Timiș | "Let Her Go" | — | — | — | — |
| 6 | Tatiana Heghea | 26 | Chișinău, Moldova | "Un-Break My Heart" | — | ✔ | — | — |
| 7 | Sergiu Cuzencov | 33 | Chișinău, Moldova | "Always on My Mind" | — | — | — | — |
| 8 | Tudor Man | 28 | Bucharest | "This Woman's Work" | ✔ | — | — | — |
| 9 | Diana Bucșa | 27 | Bucharest | "Alone" | — | — | — | ✔ |
| 10 | Bebe Panait | 30 | Voluntari, Ilfov | "Suspicious Minds" | ✔ | — | — | — |
| 11 | Anne-Marie Ionescu | 20 | Bucharest | "Diamonds" | — | — | — | — |
| 12 | Botond Surányi | 25 | Satu Mare, Satu Mare | "When I Was Your Man" | ✔ | ✔ | ✔ | ✔ |

=== Episode 7 (October 24) ===
The seventh and last blind audition episode aired on October 24, 2014.

| Order | Artist | Age | Hometown | Song | Coach's and contestant's choices | | | |
| Order | Artist | Age | Hometown | Song | Tudor | Loredana | Smiley | Moga |
|---|---|---|---|---|---|---|---|---|
| 1 | Alina Anușca | 26 | Iași, Iași | "Rather Be" | — | ✔ | ✔ | — |
| 2 | Johannes Robert Chariton | 26 | Suceava, Suceava | "So Sick" | — | — | — | — |
| 3 | Andreea Victoria Ardeleanu | 17 | Alba-Iulia, Alba | "Pleacă" | — | — | — | — |
| 4 | Ligia Hojda | 26 | Sighetu Marmației, Maramureș | "I See Fire" | ✔ | ✔ | ✔ | ✔ |
| 5 | Maria Hojda | 24 | Sighetu Marmației, Maramureș | "A Little Party Never Killed Nobody (All We Got)" | ✔ | ✔ | ✔ | ✔ |
| 6 | Claudiu Rusu | 30 | Galați, Galați | "She Will Be Loved" | ✔ | ✔ | ✔ | ✔ |
| 7 | Amir Abo Zayed | 20 | Bucharest | "All of Me" | — | — | — | — |
| 8 | Ioana Satmari | 21 | Bucharest | "Alone" | — | ✔ | — | — |
| 9 | Cătălina Bejenaru | 25 | Iași, Iași | "Stand by Me" | — | — | — | — |
| 10 | Florin Ciotlăuș | 19 | Cluj-Napoca, Cluj | "Here Without You" | ✔ | — | — | — |
| 11 | Șerban Silaghi | 17 | Tășnad, Satu Mare | "Sorry Seems to Be the Hardest Word" | — | — | — | — |
| 12 | Caroline Schally | 24 | Bucharest | "Son of a Preacher Man" | — | — | — | ✔ |

== The battles ==
After the blind auditions, each coach had fourteen contestants for the battle rounds, which aired from October 31 to November 14, 2014. Coaches began narrowing down the playing field by training the contestants. Each episode featured eight or ten battles consisting of pairings from within each team, and each battle concluding with the respective coach eliminating one of the two contestants. Each coach could steal one losing contestant from another team, thus saving them from elimination. There was no sing-off at the end of the battles.

Color key

| Artist won the battle and advanced to the next round |
| Artist lost the battle, but was stolen by another coach |
| Artist lost the battle and was eliminated |

=== Episode 8 (31 October) ===
The eighth episode aired on October 31, 2014.

| Coach | Order | Winner | Song | Loser | 'Steal' result | | | |
| Coach | Order | Winner | Song | Loser | Tudor | Loredana | Smiley | Moga |
|---|---|---|---|---|---|---|---|---|
| Tudor Chirilă | 1 | Ivana Farc | "The Lady Is a Tramp" | Ruben Ciungan | —N/a | — | — | — |
| Smiley | 2 | Fabian Sasu | "Rude" | Andrei Bălăceanu | — | — | —N/a | — |
| Loredana Groza | 3 | Lucian Colareza | "Non amarmi" | Raluca Albu | — | —N/a | — | — |
| Marius Moga | 4 | Maria Constantin | "Man Down" | Florentina Mihai | — | — | — | —N/a |
| Smiley | 5 | Vladimir Pocorschi | "Born to Be Wild" | Tiberiu Albu | ✔ | — | —N/a | — |
| Loredana Groza | 6 | Florin Răduță | "I Knew You Were Waiting (For Me)" | Bianca Ioniță | — | —N/a | — | — |
| Marius Moga | 7 | Brigitta Balogh | "Torn" | Radu Mitrea | — | — | — | —N/a |
| Tudor Chirilă | 8 | Florin Ciotlăuș | "How You Remind Me" | Matei Chioariu | —N/a | — | — | — |

=== Episode 9 (7 November) ===
The ninth episode aired on November 7, 2014.

| Coach | Order | Winner | Song | Loser | 'Steal' result | | | |
| Coach | Order | Winner | Song | Loser | Tudor | Loredana | Smiley | Moga |
|---|---|---|---|---|---|---|---|---|
| Loredana Groza | 1 | Ilinca Băcilă | "Counting Stars" | Angela Vescu | — | —N/a | — | — |
| Marius Moga | 2 | Alina Dogaru | "Thriller" | Marina Velle | — | — | — | —N/a |
| Tudor Chirilă | 3 | Petra Acker | "I Put a Spell on You" | Elena Javelea | —N/a | — | — | — |
| Smiley | 4 | Gelu Graur | "Tainted Love" | Cosmin Dragomir | — | — | —N/a | — |
| Loredana Groza | 5 | Valentin Uzun | "Love Is Blindness" | Botond Surányi | — | —N/a | — | — |
| Marius Moga | 6 | Anda Dimitriu | "Rehab" | Alexandra Bărăceanu | — | — | — | —N/a |
| Smiley | 7 | Alina Anușca | "Unwritten" | Ana Maria Georgescu | — | — | —N/a | — |
| Tudor Chirilă | 8 | Ligia Hojda | "Because of You" | Anca Petcu | —N/a | — | ✔ | — |
| Loredana Groza | 9 | Andrei Cheteleș | "Don't Stop Me Now" | Tatiana Heghea | — | —N/a | — | — |
| Smiley | 10 | Alin Gheorghișan | "Let's Get It On" | Emilia Mușală | — | — | —N/a | — |

=== Episode 10 (14 November) ===
The tenth episode aired on November 14, 2014.

| Coach | Order | Winner | Song | Loser | 'Steal' result | | | |
| Coach | Order | Winner | Song | Loser | Tudor | Loredana | Smiley | Moga |
|---|---|---|---|---|---|---|---|---|
| Loredana Groza | 1 | Maria Hojda | "Piece of My Heart" | Diana Popa | — | —N/a | — | — |
| Smiley | 2 | Aliona Munteanu | "Say Something" | Claudiu Rusu | — | — | —N/a | ✔ |
| Marius Moga | 3 | Florian Rus | "Impossible" | Eliza Manda | — | — | — | —N/a |
| Tudor Chirilă | 4 | Tudor Man | "One" | Bebe Panait | —N/a | — | — | — |
| Marius Moga | 5 | Alexandru Bunghez | "Numb" | Caroline Schally | — | — | — | —N/a |
| Loredana Groza | 6 | Ioana Satmari | "River Deep – Mountain High" | Roberta Radu | — | —N/a | — | — |
| Smiley | 7 | Maria Șimandi | "All of Me" | Robert Costin | — | — | —N/a | — |
| Tudor Chirilă | 8 | Andreea Avarvari | "Chandelier" | Larisa Mihăeș | —N/a | ✔ | — | — |
| Marius Moga | 9 | Ioan Bîgea | "Sexual Healing" | Diana Bucșa | — | — | — | —N/a |
| Tudor Chirilă | 10 | Iulia Ferchiu | "Blue Jeans" | Ana Maria Andrei | —N/a | — | — | — |

== Live shows ==
=== Live Playoffs (Week 1 & Week 2) ===
Color key

| Artist was saved by the public vote |
| Artist was chosen by their coach |
| Artist was eliminated |

Four contestants from each team competed in each of the first two live shows, which aired on November 21 and 28, respectively. In either of the two shows, the public vote could save one contestant from each team, the second one being chosen by the coach. The other two contestants were eliminated.

Week 1 (21 November)

Episode 11 (November 21)
| Coach | Order | Artist | Song | Result |
|---|---|---|---|---|
| Smiley | 1 | Alin Gheorghișan | "Just a Gigolo" | Eliminated |
| Smiley | 2 | Maria Șimandi | "Virtual Insanity" | Public vote |
| Smiley | 3 | Alina Anușca | "All About That Bass" | Eliminated |
| Smiley | 4 | Vladimir Pocorschi | "Wicked Game" | Smiley's choice |
| Loredana Groza | 5 | Ilinca Băcilă | "It's Oh So Quiet" | Loredana's choice |
| Loredana Groza | 6 | Valentin Uzun | "Canción del mariachi (Morena de mi corazón)" | Eliminated |
| Loredana Groza | 7 | Maria Hojda | "Uninvited" | Public vote |
| Loredana Groza | 8 | Lucian Colareza | "Héroe" / "Hero" | Eliminated |
| Marius Moga | 9 | Claudiu Rusu | "Blurred Lines" | Public vote |
| Marius Moga | 10 | Anda Dimitriu | "My Kind of Love" | Moga's choice |
| Marius Moga | 11 | Ioan Bîgea | "Unchain My Heart" | Eliminated |
| Marius Moga | 12 | Maria Constantin | "Hijo de la luna" | Eliminated |
| Tudor Chirilă | 13 | Andreea Avarvari | "Cry Baby" | Tudor's choice |
| Tudor Chirilă | 14 | Ivana Farc | "Supermassive Black Hole" | Public vote |
| Tudor Chirilă | 15 | Florin Ciotlăuș | "American Woman" | Eliminated |
| Tudor Chirilă | 16 | Iulia Ferchiu | "That Don't Impress Me Much" | Eliminated |

Non-competition performances
| Order | Performer | Song |
|---|---|---|
| 11.1 | Loredana Groza | "Risipitor" |
| 11.2 | PRO Dance Crew | "This Is Not a Game" |

Week 2 (28 November)

Episode 12 (November 28)
| Coach | Order | Artist | Song | Result |
|---|---|---|---|---|
| Marius Moga | 1 | Alexandru Bunghez | "Let Me Entertain You" | Moga's choice |
| Marius Moga | 2 | Alina Dogaru | "If I Ain't Got You" | Eliminated |
| Marius Moga | 3 | Florian Rus | "Sing" | Eliminated |
| Marius Moga | 4 | Brigitta Balogh | "Hurt" | Public vote |
| Tudor Chirilă | 5 | Tiberiu Albu | "Rock and Roll" | Tudor's choice |
| Tudor Chirilă | 6 | Ligia Hojda | "Wrecking Ball" | Public vote |
| Tudor Chirilă | 7 | Tudor Man | "The Man Who Can't Be Moved" | Eliminated |
| Tudor Chirilă | 8 | Petra Acker | "Can't Stop" | Eliminated |
| Loredana Groza | 9 | Florin Răduță | "One Moment in Time" | Eliminated |
| Loredana Groza | 10 | Andrei Cheteleș | "Blue Suede Shoes" | Loredana's choice |
| Loredana Groza | 11 | Ioana Satmari | "If I Could Turn Back Time" | Eliminated |
| Loredana Groza | 12 | Larisa Mihăeș | "Somebody to Love" | Public vote |
| Smiley | 13 | Fabian Sasu | "When a Woman Loves" | Eliminated |
| Smiley | 14 | Anca Petcu | "Happy" | Eliminated |
| Smiley | 15 | Gelu Graur | "Purple Rain" | Public vote |
| Smiley | 16 | Aliona Munteanu | "De-ar fi să vii" | Smiley's choice |

Non-competition performances
| Order | Performer | Song |
|---|---|---|
| 12.1 | Episode 12 contestants | "Fii de România" |
| 12.2 | Medley: | |
| 12.2 | Liviu Teodorescu | "Ești piesă" |
| 12.2 | Adda | "Îți arăt că pot" |
| 12.2 | Shift and Marius Moga | "Sus pe toc" |
| 12.2 | Marius Moga, Adda, Liviu Teodorescu, Shift | "Pe barba mea" |

=== Quarterfinals (Week 3) ===
All 16 remaining contestants competed in the third live show on December 5, 2014. Voting proceeded as before.

Episode 13 (December 5)
| Coach | Order | Artist | Song | Result |
|---|---|---|---|---|
| Smiley | 1 | Vladimir Pocorschi | "Smells Like Teen Spirit" | Eliminated |
| Tudor Chirilă | 2 | Ivana Farc | "Over the Rainbow" | Eliminated |
| Loredana Groza | 3 | Andrei Cheteleș | "Hallelujah I Love Her So" | Eliminated |
| Marius Moga | 4 | Alexandru Bunghez | "The Show Must Go On" | Eliminated |
| Smiley | 5 | Maria Șimandi | "Feeling Good" | Eliminated |
| Tudor Chirilă | 6 | Andreea Avarvari | "Perfect" | Eliminated |
| Loredana Groza | 7 | Larisa Mihăeș | "Let Her Go" | Eliminated |
| Marius Moga | 8 | Claudiu Rusu | "White Christmas" | Eliminated |
| Smiley | 9 | Aliona Munteanu | "Titanium" | Smiley's choice |
| Tudor Chirilă | 10 | Tiberiu Albu | "Dream On" | Public vote |
| Loredana Groza | 11 | Maria Hojda | "She Wolf (Falling to Pieces)" | Public vote |
| Marius Moga | 12 | Brigitta Balogh | "Free Your Mind" | Moga's choice |
| Smiley | 13 | Gelu Graur | "Sweet Child o' Mine" | Public vote |
| Tudor Chirilă | 14 | Ligia Hojda | "My Immortal" | Tudor's choice |
| Loredana Groza | 15 | Ilinca Băcilă | "You & I" | Loredana's choice |
| Marius Moga | 16 | Anda Dimitriu | "Believe" | Public vote |

Non-competition performances
| Order | Performer | Song |
|---|---|---|
| 13.1 | Vama | "Victoria ta" |
| 13.2 | Smiley | "I Wish" |

=== Semi-final (Week 4) ===
All eight remaining contestants performed two songs each in the semi-final on Saturday, December 12, 2014: a solo song and a trio with the coach and the other contestant in their team. Within each team, the coach and the viewers had a 40/60 say; the contestant with the highest combined percentage went on to the final.

Episode 14 (December 12)
| Coach | Order | Artist | Solo Song | Order | Trio Song | Result |
|---|---|---|---|---|---|---|
| Loredana Groza | 1 | Ilinca Băcilă | "He Taught Me How to Yodel" | 8 | "Mi-am pus busuioc în păr | Eliminated |
| Loredana Groza | 5 | Maria Hojda | "Memory" | 8 | "Mi-am pus busuioc în păr | Advanced |
| Tudor Chirilă | 2 | Tiberiu Albu | "You Shook Me All Night Long" | 10 | "Cântec prost" | Advanced |
| Tudor Chirilă | 12 | Ligia Hojda | "I Dreamed a Dream" | 10 | "Cântec prost" | Eliminated |
| Marius Moga | 4 | Brigitta Balogh | "If I Were a Boy" | 6 | Medley: "Tot mai sus", "Timpul", "K la meteo", "Taxi", "Angels (Love Is the Answer)" & "Beijo (Uh-La-La)" | Eliminated |
| Marius Moga | 11 | Anda Dimitriu | "Spune-mi" | 6 | Medley: "Tot mai sus", "Timpul", "K la meteo", "Taxi", "Angels (Love Is the Answer)" & "Beijo (Uh-La-La)" | Advanced |
| Smiley | 7 | Gelu Graur | "At Last" | 3 | "E bine, bine, e foarte bine" | Eliminated |
| Smiley | 9 | Aliona Munteanu | "I (Who Have Nothing)" | 3 | "E bine, bine, e foarte bine" | Advanced |

Non-competition performances
| Order | Performer | Song |
|---|---|---|
| 14.1 | Alexandra Stan | "Cherry Pop" |
| 14.2 | Alexandra Stan | "Vanilla Chocolat" |

Results
| Coach | Finalist | | Coach/televote percentages | Eliminated | |
|---|---|---|---|---|---|
| Smiley | Aliona Munteanu | 60.8% | 50.0% 50.0% | 39.2% | Gelu Graur |
| Smiley | Aliona Munteanu | 60.8% | 68.0% 32.0% | 39.2% | Gelu Graur |
| Tudor Chirilă | Tiberiu Albu | 53.6% | 50.0% 50.0% | 46.4% | Ligia Hojda |
| Tudor Chirilă | Tiberiu Albu | 53.6% | 56.0% 44.0% | 46.4% | Ligia Hojda |
| Marius Moga | Anda Dimitriu | 51.5% | 50.0% 50.0% | 48.5% | Brigitta Balogh |
| Marius Moga | Anda Dimitriu | 51.5% | 52.5% 47.5% | 48.5% | Brigitta Balogh |
| Loredana Groza | Maria Hojda | 60.7% | 50.0% 50.0% | 39.3% | Ilinca Băcilă |
| Loredana Groza | Maria Hojda | 60.7% | 67.9% 32.1% | 39.3% | Ilinca Băcilă |

=== Final (Week 5) ===
The top 4 contestants performed in the grand final on Friday, December 19, 2014. This week, the four finalists performed a solo song, a duet with a well-known musician (or group of musicians) and a duet with their coach. The public vote determined the winner, and that resulted in a victory for Tiberiu Albu, Tudor Chirilă's first victory as a coach.

Episode 15 (December 19)
| Coach | Artist | Order | Solo Song | Order | Duet Song (with musician) | Order | Duet Song (with coach) | Result |
|---|---|---|---|---|---|---|---|---|
| Smiley | Aliona Munteanu | 1 | "Let It Go" | 5 | "Andrii Popa" / "Vara la țară" (with Mircea Baniciu) | 9 | "Stay with Me" | Fourth place |
| Tudor Chirilă | Tiberiu Albu | 10 | "Stairway to Heaven" | 2 | "The Phantom of the Opera" (with Irina Baianț) | 6 | "Ana" | Winner |
| Loredana Groza | Maria Hojda | 7 | "Because of You" | 11 | "Ave Maria" / "Ameno" (with Brio Sonores) | 3 | Traditional song from Maramureș / "Cât îi Maramureșul"* | Third place |
| Marius Moga | Anda Dimitriu | 4 | "All by Myself" | 8 | "The Lonely Shepherd" / "Lie, ciocârlie" (with Gheorghe Zamfir) | 12 | "Amazing Grace" / "Oh Happy Day" | Runner-up |

* Flavia, Francesca and Augustin, Maria's siblings, joined Maria and Loredana for the performance.

Non-competition performances
| Order | Performer | Song |
|---|---|---|
| 1 | Pavel Bartoș | Parody medley: "Bună seara, iubito!" "Cai verzi pe pereți" "Nu am chef azi" "Tot mai sus" |
| 2 | David Bisbal | "Diez mil maneras" |
| 3 | Inna | "Strigă!" / "Diggy Down" |
| 4 | David Bisbal | "No amanece" |
| 5 | Mihai Chițu | "Tot ce vreau" |

== Elimination chart ==
Color key
Artist info

- Artist from Team Tudor
- Artist from Team Loredana
- Artist from Team Smiley
- Artist from Team Moga

Result details

- Winner
- Runner-up
- Third place
- Fourth place
- Artist was saved by the public vote
- Artist was saved by their coach
- Artist was eliminated

=== Overall ===
| # | Week 1 | Week 2 | Week 3 | Week 4 | Final |
|---|---|---|---|---|---|
| Tiberiu Albu | —N/a | Safe | Safe | Safe (53.6%) | Winner |
| Anda Dimitriu | Safe | —N/a | Safe | Safe (51.5%) | Runner-up |
| Maria Hojda | Safe | —N/a | Safe | Safe (60.7%) | 3rd place |
| Aliona Munteanu | —N/a | Safe | Safe | Safe (60.8%) | 4th place |
| Brigitta Balogh | —N/a | Safe | Safe | Eliminated (48.5%) | Eliminated (Week 4) |
| Ligia Hojda | —N/a | Safe | Safe | Eliminated (46.4%) | Eliminated (Week 4) |
| Ilinca Băcilă | Safe | —N/a | Safe | Eliminated (39.3%) | Eliminated (Week 4) |
| Gelu Graur | —N/a | Safe | Safe | Eliminated (39.2%) | Eliminated (Week 4) |
| Alexandru Bunghez | —N/a | Safe | Eliminated | Eliminated (Week 3) | |
| Claudiu Rusu | Safe | —N/a | Eliminated | Eliminated (Week 3) | |
| Larisa Mihăeș | —N/a | Safe | Eliminated | Eliminated (Week 3) | |
| Andrei Cheteleș | —N/a | Safe | Eliminated | Eliminated (Week 3) | |
| Andreea Avarvari | Safe | —N/a | Eliminated | Eliminated (Week 3) | |
| Ivana Farc | Safe | —N/a | Eliminated | Eliminated (Week 3) | |
| Vladimir Pocorschi | Safe | —N/a | Eliminated | Eliminated (Week 3) | |
| Maria Șimandi | Safe | —N/a | Eliminated | Eliminated (Week 3) | |
| Anca Petcu | —N/a | Eliminated | Eliminated (Week 2) | | |
| Fabian Sasu | —N/a | Eliminated | Eliminated (Week 2) | | |
| Florin Răduță | —N/a | Eliminated | Eliminated (Week 2) | | |
| Ioana Satmari | —N/a | Eliminated | Eliminated (Week 2) | | |
| Petra Acker | —N/a | Eliminated | Eliminated (Week 2) | | |
| Tudor Man | —N/a | Eliminated | Eliminated (Week 2) | | |
| Alina Dogaru | —N/a | Eliminated | Eliminated (Week 2) | | |
| Florian Rus | —N/a | Eliminated | Eliminated (Week 2) | | |
| Florin Ciotlăuș | Eliminated | Eliminated (Week 1) | | | |
| Iulia Ferchiu | Eliminated | Eliminated (Week 1) | | | |
| Ioan Bîgea | Eliminated | Eliminated (Week 1) | | | |
| Maria Constantin | Eliminated | Eliminated (Week 1) | | | |
| Lucian Colareza | Eliminated | Eliminated (Week 1) | | | |
| Valentin Uzun | Eliminated | Eliminated (Week 1) | | | |
| Alina Anușca | Eliminated | Eliminated (Week 1) | | | |
| Alin Gheorghișan | Eliminated | Eliminated (Week 1) | | | |

== Controversies ==
Matei Sorescu, Claudiu Zamfira and Cezar Dometi, contestants in season 2, criticized the fourth season, claiming that the contestants' voices had been digitally manipulated.

== Ratings ==
| Phase | # | Original airdate | Timeslot (EEST / EET) | Target | | | | | | | | | | | | | | Sources |
| Phase | # | Original airdate | Timeslot (EEST / EET) | National | | | | | Urban | | | | | 18–49 | | | | Sources |
| Phase | # | Original airdate | Timeslot (EEST / EET) | Rk | Pk (000) | Avg (000) | Rtg (%) | Shr (%) | Rk | Pk (000) | Avg (000) | Rtg (%) | Shr (%) | Rk | Avg (000) | Rtg (%) | Shr (%) | Sources |
|---|---|---|---|---|---|---|---|---|---|---|---|---|---|---|---|---|---|---|
| Blind auditions | 1 | September 16, 2014 | Tuesday, 8:30 PM | 1 | 2,500 | 1,915 | 10.3 | 20.8 | 1 | 1,470 | 1,128 | 11.2 | 22.1 | 1 | 736 | 14.7 | 34.6 | |
| Blind auditions | 2 | September 19, 2014 | Friday, 8:30 PM | 1 | 2,460 | 1,708 | 9.2 | 19.0 | 1 | 1,420 | 1,009 | 10.0 | 20.4 | 1 | 605 | 12.0 | 27.5 | |
| Blind auditions | 3 | September 26, 2014 | Friday, 8:30 PM | 1 | 2,730 | 2,034 | 11.0 | 21.0 | 1 | 1,720 | 1,181 | 11.7 | 22.5 | 1 | 688 | 13.6 | 30.9 | |
| Blind auditions | 4 | October 3, 2014 | Friday, 8:30 PM | 1 | 2,660 | 2,091 | 11.3 | 21.6 | 1 | 1,630 | 1,203 | 12.0 | 23.1 | 1 | 726 | 14.5 | 31.2 | |
| Blind auditions | 5 | October 10, 2014 | Friday, 8:30 PM | 1 | 2,650 | 1,930 | 10.4 | 20.0 | 1 | 1,670 | 1,146 | 11.4 | 21.9 | 1 | 705 | 14.1 | 32.1 | |
| Blind auditions | 6 | October 17, 2014 | Friday, 8:30 PM | 1 | 2,758 | 2,090 | 11.3 | 21.4 | 1 | 1,534 | 1,189 | 11.8 | 22.2 | 1 | 722 | 14.3 | 30.7 | |
| Blind auditions | 7 | October 24, 2014 | Friday, 8:30 PM | 1 | 2,795 | 2,149 | 11.6 | 21.1 | 1 | 1,511 | 1,132 | 11.2 | 20.4 | 1 | 715 | 14.3 | 29.8 | |
| Battles | 8 | October 31, 2014 | Friday, 8:30 PM | 1 | 2,301 | 1,745 | 9.4 | 19.1 | 1 | 1,272 | 920 | 9.1 | 18.8 | 1 | 577 | 11.4 | 27.1 | |
| Battles | 9 | November 7, 2014 | Friday, 8:30 PM | 1 | —N/a | 1,522 | 8.2 | 19.5 | 1 | —N/a | 853 | 8.5 | 19.3 | 1 | 526 | 10.5 | 26.7 | |
| Battles | 10 | November 14, 2014 | Friday, 8:30 PM | 2 | —N/a | 1,309 | 7.1 | 14.7 | 2 | —N/a | 755 | 7.5 | 15.2 | 1 | 476 | 9.5 | 22.4 | |
| Live shows | 11 | November 21, 2014 | Friday, 8:30 PM | 1 | —N/a | 1,242 | 6.7 | 16.9 | 1 | —N/a | 757 | 7.5 | 17.9 | 1 | 454 | 9.0 | 24.8 | |
| Live shows | 12 | November 28, 2014 | Friday, 8:30 PM | 1 | —N/a | 1,206 | 6.5 | 16.4 | 1 | —N/a | 668 | 6.6 | 16.0 | 1 | 338 | 7.8 | 21.1 | |
| Live shows | 13 | December 5, 2014 | Friday, 8:30 PM | 1 | —N/a | 1,095 | 5.9 | 15.3 | 1 | —N/a | 616 | 6.1 | 14.9 | 1 | 384 | 7.6 | 20.7 | |
| Semi-final | 14 | December 12, 2014 | Friday, 8:30 PM | 1 | 1,979 | 1,205 | 6.5 | 17.3 | 1 | 1,135 | 723 | 7.2 | 18.3 | 1 | 440 | 8.8 | 25.0 | |
| Final | 15 | December 19, 2014 | Friday, 8:30 PM | 1 | 2,224 | 1,664 | 9.0 | 20.7 | 1 | 1,237 | 952 | 9.5 | 21.8 | 1 | 560 | 11.2 | 29.3 | |
