= Vocea României season 3 =

Vocea României
- Season 3
- Hosted by: Pavel Bartoș
- Coaches: Horia Brenciu; Loredana Groza; Smiley; Marius Moga
- Winner: Mihai Chițu
- Winning coach: Horia Brenciu
- Runner-up: Sânziana Niculae
- No. of episodes: 14

Release
- Original network: ProTV
- Original release: September 28 – December 26, 2013

Season chronology
- ← Previous; Season 2 Next → Season 4

The third season of the Romanian reality talent show Vocea României premiered on ProTV on September 28, 2013. Pavel Bartoș and Nicoleta Luciu returned as hosts, with Vlad Roșca as the social media correspondent. All four coaches returned for their third season. The show was moved from its usual Tuesday evening slot to Saturday evening.

This season brought rule changes. During the battle round, opposing coaches have the ability to steal the singer that was sent home by the original coach. If more than one coach hits their button to recruit the singer in question, it is up to the contestant to decide which coach he or she wants to work with. Each coach can save two contestants, which means the battle round will end with nine singers on each team, rather than seven. The sing-off further reduces each team to eight singers for the live shows, rather than six as in the previous season.

The season finale aired on December 26, 2013. Mihai Chițu, mentored by coach Horia Brenciu, was declared winner of the season. It was Brenciu's second consecutive victory as a coach.

== Pre-selections ==
Cities where the pre-selections were held.

Pre-selections took place in the following cities:

Location	Date	Venue
Cluj-Napoca	April 7, 2013	Hotel Belvedere
Timișoara	April 14, 2013	Hotel Continental
Iași	April 21, 2013	Hotel Unirea
Brașov	April 28, 2013	Hotel Kronwell
Bucharest	May 12, 2013	Ramada Bucharest Parc Hotel

== Teams ==
Color key

- Winner
- Runner-up
- Third place
- Fourth place
- Eliminated in the live shows
- Eliminated in the sing-off round
- Artist was stolen by another coach
- Eliminated in the battle rounds

Coaches	Top 56 artists					
Horia Brenciu						
Horia Brenciu	Mihai Chițu	Ana-Maria Mirică	Georgia Dascălu	Denisa Moșincat	Árpi Török	Florin Ilinca
Horia Brenciu	Andrei Hanghiuc	Florin Timbuc	Diana Arvinte	~~Kinga Farkas~~	~~Adrian Nour~~	~~Gabriel Kisczuk~~
Horia Brenciu	Ana-Maria Bucșă	Andrada Ghiorma	Răzvan Răducă	Ruxandra Măcărescu		
Marius Moga						
Marius Moga	Sânziana Niculae	Jovana Milovanović	Felix Burdușa	Andi Grasu	Angelo Simonică	Elena Șalaru
Marius Moga	Andrei Loică	Dana Torop	Gabriel Kisczuk	~~Georgia Dascălu~~	~~Răzvan Pașca~~	~~Bogdan Olaru~~
Marius Moga	Diana Dolcan	Mihai Farkaș	Elis Opriș	Mădălina Omania		
Smiley						
Smiley	Adrian Nour	Claudia Iuga	Stella Anița	Iolanda Moldoveanu	Nicoleta Țicală	George Secioreanu
Smiley	Lucian Frâncu	Răzvan Alexa	Bogdan Olaru	~~Andrei Hanghiuc~~	~~Elena Șalaru~~	Adrian Molnar
Smiley	Valentin Câmpeanu	Cosmin Arsene	Gabriel Onilă	Gabriel Burduja		
Loredana Groza						
Loredana Groza	Marius Marin	Muneer al-Obeidli	Alina Dorobanțu	Florin Mândru	Andrei Chermeleu	Kinga Farkas
Loredana Groza	Iulia Dumitrache	Aurel Niamțu	Răzvan Pașca	Dudu Isabel	Ana Kalmar	Marcela Scripcaru
Loredana Groza	Claudiu Grosu	Alina Păun	Mihai Băjinaru	Romeo Zaharia		
Note: Italicized names are stolen contestants (names struck through within former teams).

== Blind auditions ==
The first phase of the competition, the blind auditions, taped August 5–8, 2013 at the MediaPro Studios, Buftea, began airing when the season premiered on September 28, 2013.

Color key

✔	Coach hit his/her "I WANT YOU" button
	Artist defaulted to this coach's team
	Artist elected to join this coach's team
	Artist eliminated with no coach pressing his or her "I WANT YOU" button

=== Episode 1 (September 28) ===
The first of six pre-recorded audition episodes aired on Saturday, September 28, 2013. The season 2 finalists opened the show with a performance of "Don't Stop Believin'".

Order	Artist	Age	Hometown	Song	Coach's and contestant's choices			
Order	Artist	Age	Hometown	Song	Brenciu	Loredana	Smiley	Moga
1	Bogdan Olaru	22	Moreni, Dâmbovița	"Help!"	✔	—	—	✔
2	Iulia Dumitrache	23	Bucharest	"Shy Guy"	✔	✔	✔	✔
3	Gabriel Onilă	34	Bucharest	"Fragile"	✔	—	✔	—
4	Marian Radu	27	Răcari, Dâmbovița	"Lost"	—	—	—	—
5	Marta Onilă	28	Bucharest	"Nah Neh Nah"	—	—	—	—
6	Dana Torop	27	Craiova, Dolj	"I Look to You"	—	—	—	✔
7	Gabriel Kisczuk	32	Rădăuți, Suceava	"I'm Still Standing"	✔	✔	—	—
8	Valerian Coșug	61	Bucharest	"Dance Me to the End of Love"	—	—	—	—
9	Mihai Chițu	33	Bucharest	"The Great Pretender"	✔	—	—	✔
10	Ana-Maria Mirică	35	Ploiești, Prahova	"Cabaret"	✔	✔	✔	✔
11	Andrada Ghiorma	28	Cisnădie, Sibiu	"Skinny Love"	✔	—	—	—
12	Aurel Niamțu	64	Iași, Iași	"Cine iubește și lasă [Blestem]"	—	✔	—	—
13	Răzvan Alexa	22	Verșeni, Iași	"No Woman, No Cry"	—	✔	✔	—

=== Episode 2 (October 5) ===
The second episode was aired on October 5, 2013.

Order	Artist	Age	Hometown	Song	Coach's and contestant's choices			
Order	Artist	Age	Hometown	Song	Brenciu	Loredana	Smiley	Moga
1	Diana Irina Vasian	26	Lupeni	"Try"	—	—	—	—
2	Diana Arvinte	24	Constanța, Constanța	"American Woman"	✔	✔	—	—
3	Adrian Molnar	28	Reghin, Mureș	"Just the Way You Are"	—	—	✔	✔
4	Giulio Laurențiu Vasilescu	34	Bucharest	"Crying in the Rain"	—	—	—	—
5	Ana Kalmar	24	Cluj-Napoca, Cluj	"Next to Me"	✔	✔	—	—
6	Florin Ilinca	22	Bucharest	"Du hast"	✔	—	—	—
7	Sânziana Niculae	19	Urziceni, Ialomița	"Blue Jeans"	✔	✔	✔	✔
8	Elena Carafizi	19	Chișinău, Moldova	"Why Don't You Love Me?"	—	—	—	—
9	Angelo Simonică	17	Bucharest	"The Man Who Can't Be Moved"	—	—	—	✔
10	Alexandru Cibotaru	28	Chișinău, Moldova	"Atât de singur"	—	—	—	—
11	Adrian Nour	32	Galați, Galați	"The Girl from Ipanema"	✔	—	—	—
12	Muneer al-Obeidli	29	Abu Dhabi, United Arab Emirates	"Ride It"	✔	✔	✔	✔
13	Cosmin Pienariu	32	Sebeș, Alba	"Te iubesc, femeie"	—	—	—	—
14	Alina Păun	17	Bucharest	"One and Only"	—	✔	—	—

=== Episode 3 (October 12) ===
The third episode was aired on October 12, 2013.

Order	Artist	Age	Hometown	Song	Coach's and contestant's choices			
Order	Artist	Age	Hometown	Song	Brenciu	Loredana	Smiley	Moga
1	Silviu Mircescu	23	Bucharest	"Dragostea-i nebună"	—	—	—	—
2	Claudia Iuga	34	Arad, Arad	"Holding Out for a Hero"	—	✔	✔	—
3	Răzvan Pașca	25	Baia Mare, Maramureș	"When I Was Your Man"	—	✔	—	✔
4	Fănel Cornelius	38	Castrop-Rauxel, Germany	"You"	—	—	—	—
5	Stella Anița	30	Bucharest	"Impossible"	✔	✔	✔	✔
6	Ruxandra Măcărescu	27	Bucharest	"You Know I'm No Good"	✔	—	—	—
7	Claudiu Grosu	28	Bucharest	"Volare"	—	✔	✔	—
8	Adrian Pleșcău	23	Brașov, Brașov	"You Need Me, I Don't Need You"	—	—	—	—
9	Felix Burdușa	21	Focșani, Vrancia	"What Goes Around... Comes Around"	—	✔	—	✔
10	Jovana Milovanović	17	Kovin, Serbia	"I Was Here"	—	—	—	✔
11	Mihaela Câmpean	49	Bucharest	"Dream a Little Dream of Me"	—	—	—	—
12	Andrei Chermeleu	28	Bucharest	"Red"	✔	✔	✔	✔
13	Marcela Scripcaru	24	Bucharest	"Queen of the Night"	—	✔	—	—

=== Episode 4 (October 19) ===
The fourth episode was aired on October 19, 2013.

Order	Artist	Age	Hometown	Song	Coach's and contestant's choices			
Order	Artist	Age	Hometown	Song	Brenciu	Loredana	Smiley	Moga
1	Monica Budui	25	Târgu-Jiu, Gorj	"Don't Know Why"	—	—	—	—
2	Andrei Hanghiuc	31	Bucharest	"I Need a Dollar"	✔	—	✔	✔
3	Elena Șalaru	22	Chișinău, Moldova	"Bring Me to Life"	—	—	✔	—
4	Mihai Farkaș	21	Făgăraș, Brașov	"Please Forgive Me"	✔	—	—	✔
5	Ștefan Lăutaru	21	Bucharest	"Jailhouse Rock"	—	—	—	—
6	Valentin Câmpeanu	22	Târgu Neamț, Neamț	"Insatiable"	✔	—	✔	—
7	Kinga Farkas	22	Lupeni, Hunedoara	"Unfaithful"	✔	—	—	—
8	Lucian Frâncu	26	Brașov, Brașov	"Whataya Want from Me"	✔	✔	✔	✔
9	Cătălina Săplăcan	20	Dej, Cluj	"Love You like a Love Song"	—	—	—	—
10	Florin Mândru	37	Târgu Mureș, Mureș	"The Road to Hell"	✔	✔	—	✔
11	Árpi Török	34	Cluj-Napoca, Cluj	"I Got You (I Feel Good)"	✔	—	✔	—
12	Geanina Iorgoaia	25	Timișoara, Timiș	"I Love Rock 'n' Roll"	—	—	—	—
13	Elis Opriș	18	Mangalia, Constanța	"Upside Down"	✔	✔	—	✔

=== Episode 5 (October 26) ===
The fifth episode was aired on October 26, 2013.

Order	Artist	Age	Hometown	Song	Coach's and contestant's choices			
Order	Artist	Age	Hometown	Song	Brenciu	Loredana	Smiley	Moga
1	Andi Grasu	30	Lugoj, Timiș	"Red"	✔	—	—	✔
2	Alin Nica	32	Dudeștii Noi, Timiș	"Sway"	—	—	—	—
3	Iolanda Moldoveanu	21	Brașov, Brașov	"Skyfall"	—	—	✔	✔
4	George Secioreanu	22	Tulcea, Tulcea	"Copacul"	✔	✔	✔	—
5	Alina Dorobanțu	20	Slatina, Olt	"I Don't Believe You"	✔	✔	—	—
6	Mihai Napu	46	Bucharest	"Not the Same Dreams Anymore"	—	—	—	—
7	Andrei Loică	16	Măgurele, Ilfov	"If You're Not the One"	✔	✔	—	✔
8	Răzvan Răducă	25	Bacău, Bacău	"Ain't No Sunshine"	✔	—	—	—
9	Diana Dolcan	20	Brașov, Brașov	"Down on My Knees"	—	—	—	✔
10	Octavian Clonda	33	Brașov, Brașov	"Wherever You Will Go"	—	—	—	—
11	Denisa Moșincat	22	Oradea, Bihor	"A Moment Like This"	✔	✔	✔	✔
12	Mihai Băjinaru	41	Bucharest	"Sex Bomb"	—	✔	—	—
13	Dudu Isabel	37	Cluj-Napoca, Cluj	"Jump"	✔	✔	✔	—

=== Episode 6 (November 2) ===
The sixth and last blind audition episode aired on November 2, 2013.

Order	Artist	Age	Hometown	Song	Coach's and contestant's choices			
Order	Artist	Age	Hometown	Song	Brenciu	Loredana	Smiley	Moga
1	Ana-Maria Bucșă	16	Botoșani, Botoșani	"Hero"	✔	✔	—	—
2	Alexandra Șipoș	17	Bucharest	"Try"	—	—	—	—
3	Cosmin Arsene	29	Sinaia, Prahova	"Goodbye My Lover"	✔	✔	✔	✔
4	Marius Marin	33	Slobozia, Ialomița	"She"	—	✔	—	✔
5	Georgia Dascălu	17	Bucharest	"Girl on Fire"	✔	—	—	✔
6	Nicoleta Țicală	24	Bucharest	"Cry Baby"	—	—	✔	—
7	Florin Timbuc	18	Brașov, Brașov	"Bed of Roses"	✔	✔	—	—
8	Georgiana Jecu	27	Oradea, Bihor	"Waterloo"	—	—	—	—
9	Mădălina Omania	31	Botoșani, Botoșani	"This World"	—	✔	—	✔
10	Gabriel Burduja	34	Reșița, Caraș-Severin	"I Got a Woman"	✔	✔	✔	—
11	Alex Florea	21	Constanța, Constanța	"Save Room"	—	—	—	—
12	Diana Odeșteanu	44	Brașov, Brașov	"Crazy"	—	—	—	—
13	Romeo Zaharia	36	Vaslui, Vaslui	"Kiss"	—	✔	—	—

== The battles ==
After the blind auditions, each coach had fourteen contestants for the battle rounds, taped October 10 and 11, 2013, at the MediaPro Studios, Buftea, and aired November 9–23, 2013. Coaches began narrowing down the playing field by training the contestants with the help of "trusted advisors". Each episode featured eight or ten battles consisting of pairings from within each team, and each battle concluding with the respective coach eliminating one of the two contestants. "Steals" were introduced this season, where each coach could steal two contestants from another team when they lost their battle round. The names of the coaches who attempted to steal each losing contestant are ticked; the chosen coach is highlighted. The trusted advisors for these episodes are:

- Monica Anghel (working with Horia Brenciu)
- Cornel Ilie (working with Loredana Groza)
- Șerban Cazan (working with Smiley)
- Randi (working with Marius Moga)

Color key

Artist won the battle and advanced to the next round
Artist lost the battle, but was stolen by another coach
Artist lost the battle and was eliminated

=== Episode 7 (9 November) ===
The seventh episode aired on November 9, 2013.

Coach	Order	Winner	Song	Loser	'Steal' result			
Coach	Order	Winner	Song	Loser	Brenciu	Loredana	Smiley	Moga
Smiley	1	Claudia Iuga	"When You're Gone"	Gabriel Burduja	—	—	—N/a	—
Horia Brenciu	2	Diana Arvinte	"Dance Dance"	Gabriel Kisczuk	—N/a	—	—	✔
Marius Moga	3	Jovana Milovanović	"The World Is Not Enough"	Mădălina Omania	—	—	—	—N/a
Loredana Groza	4	Aurel Niamțu	"Nu m-am gândit la despărțire"	Romeo Zaharia	—	—N/a	—	—
Smiley	5	Iolanda Moldoveanu	"Another Day in Paradise"	Gabriel Onilă	—	—	—N/a	—
Marius Moga	6	Angelo Simonică	"Papa Was a Rollin' Stone"	Elis Opriș	—	—	—	—N/a
Horia Brenciu	7	Mihai Chițu	"Kids"	Ruxandra Măcărescu	—N/a	—	—	—
Smiley	8	George Secioreanu	"Creep"	Elena Șalaru	✔	—	—N/a	✔
Loredana Groza	9	Alina Dorobanțu	"Nobody Wants to Be Lonely"	Mihai Băjinaru	—	—N/a	—	—
Marius Moga	10	Dana Torop	"If You Don't Know Me By Now"	Bogdan Olaru	—	—	✔	—N/a

=== Episode 8 (16 November) ===
The eighth episode aired on November 16, 2013.

Coach	Order	Winner	Song	Loser	'Steal' result			
Coach	Order	Winner	Song	Loser	Brenciu	Loredana	Smiley	Moga
Smiley	1	Nicoleta Țicală	"Delicate"	Cosmin Arsene	—	—	—N/a	—
Horia Brenciu	2	Árpi Török	"Locked Out of Heaven"	Răzvan Răducă	—N/a	—	—	—
Marius Moga	3	Andi Grasu	"Summer of '69"	Răzvan Pașca	—	✔	—	—N/a
Loredana Groza	4	Andrei Chermeleu	"Suddenly"	Alina Păun	—	—N/a	—	—
Smiley	5	Stella Anița	"Beneath Your Beautiful"	Andrei Hanghiuc	✔	—	—N/a	✔
Marius Moga	6	Felix Burdușa	"With You"	Mihai Farkaș	—	—	—	—N/a
Horia Brenciu	7	Ana-Maria Mirică	"Inima ta"	Adrian Nour	—N/a	—	✔	✔
Smiley	8	Răzvan Alexa	"Somebody to Love Me"	Valentin Câmpeanu	—	—	—N/a	—
Loredana Groza	9	Florin Mândru	"N'oubliez jamais"	Claudiu Grosu	—	—N/a	—	—
Marius Moga	10	Andrei Loică	"Fix You"	Diana Dolcan	—	—	—	—N/a

=== Episode 9 (16 November) ===
The ninth episode aired on November 23, 2013.

Coach	Order	Winner	Song	Loser	'Steal' result			
Coach	Order	Winner	Song	Loser	Brenciu	Loredana	Smiley	Moga
Loredana Groza	1	Marius Marin	"Tonight"	Marcela Scripcaru	—	—N/a	—	—
Horia Brenciu	2	Florin Timbuc	"Crazy Little Thing Called Love"	Kinga Farkas	—N/a	✔	—	—
Smiley	3	Lucian Frâncu	"Love Me Again" / "Get Lucky"	Adrian Molnar	—	—	—N/a	—
Loredana Groza	4	Muneer al-Obeidli	"I Belong to You"	Ana Kalmar	—	—N/a	—	—
Horia Brenciu	5	Florin Ilinca	"Where the Wild Roses Grow"	Andrada Ghiorma	—N/a	—	—	—
Marius Moga	6	Sânziana Niculae	"Turn Off the Light"	Georgia Dascălu	✔	—	—	—N/a
Loredana Groza	7	Iulia Dumitrache	"It Takes Two"	Dudu Isabel	—	—N/a	—	—
Horia Brenciu	8	Denisa Moșincat	"La La La"	Ana-Maria Bucșă	—N/a	—	—	—

== The Sing-off ==
At the end of the battle rounds, each coach advanced seven contestants from their team to the live shows, leaving the other two to duel for the eighth and last spot, in an extra round called "the sing-off" (cântecul decisiv). The contestants sang their blind audition songs again and the coaches chose one contestant each.

Color key:

Artist won the Sing off and advanced to the Live shows
Artist lost the Sing off and was eliminated

Coach	Order	Artist	Song	Result
Marius Moga	1	Jovana Milovanović	"I Was Here"	Advanced
Marius Moga	2	Gabriel Kisczuk	"I'm Still Standing"	Eliminated
Horia Brenciu	3	Diana Arvinte	"American Woman"	Eliminated
Horia Brenciu	4	Georgia Dascălu	"Girl on Fire"	Advanced
Loredana Groza	5	Răzvan Pașca	"When I Was Your Man"	Eliminated
Loredana Groza	6	Iulia Dumitrache	"Shy Guy"	Advanced
Smiley	7	Nicoleta Țicală	"Cry Baby"	Advanced
Smiley	8	Bogdan Olaru	"Help!"	Eliminated

== Live shows ==
Color key

Artist was saved by the public vote
Artist was chosen by their coach
Artist was eliminated

=== Live Playoffs (Week 1 & 2) ===
Four contestants from each team competed in each of the first two live shows, which aired on Sunday, December 1 and Saturday, December 7, 2012, respectively. In either of the two shows, the public vote could save one contestant from each team, the second one being chosen by the coach. The other two contestants were eliminated.

==== Week 1 (December 1) ====
Episode 10 (December 1)
Coach	Order	Artist	Song	Result
Smiley	1	Lucian Frâncu	"18 ani"	Eliminated
Horia Brenciu	2	Andrei Hanghiuc	"Isn't She Lovely?"	Eliminated
Loredana Groza	3	Alina Dorobanțu	"Lie, ciocârlie"	Public vote
Marius Moga	4	Andrei Loică	"Let Her Go"	Eliminated
Smiley	5	Claudia Iuga	"Hot Stuff"	Public vote
Horia Brenciu	6	Florin Timbuc	"Mama, I'm Coming Home"	Eliminated
Loredana Groza	7	Aurel Niamțu	"De vrei să știi ce înseamnă român"	Eliminated
Marius Moga	8	Jovana Milovanović	"Tu n-ai avut curaj"	Moga's choice
Smiley	9	Răzvan Alexa	"Oare știi"	Eliminated
Horia Brenciu	10	Denisa Moșincat	"Iartă"	Public vote
Loredana Groza	11	Iulia Dumitrache	"Think Twice"	Eliminated
Marius Moga	12	Dana Torop	"Mociriță"	Eliminated
Smiley	13	Iolanda Moldoveanu	"Believe"	Smiley's choice
Horia Brenciu	14	Ana-Maria Mirică	"Hora din Moldova"	Brenciu's choice
Loredana Groza	15	Florin Mândru	"18 til I Die"	Loredana's choice
Marius Moga	16	Andi Grasu	"It's a Man's Man's Man's World"	Public vote

Non-competition performances
Order	Performer	Song
1	Top 32 contestants	"Deșteaptă-te, române!"
2	Stromae	"Alors on danse"
3	Stromae	"Papaoutai"
4	What's Up and deMoga Music	"La mulți ani"

==== Week 2 (December 7) ====
Episode 11 (December 7)
Coach	Order	Artist	Song	Result
Horia Brenciu	1	Arpi Török	"Baila morena"	Eliminated
Loredana Groza	2	Kinga Farkas	"Born This Way"	Eliminated
Smiley	3	George Secioreanu	"As Long as You Love Me"	Eliminated
Marius Moga	4	Angelo Simonică	"Rockstar"	Eliminated
Horia Brenciu	5	Florin Ilinca	"Summer Wind"	Eliminated
Loredana Groza	6	Andrei Chermeleu	"Father Figure"	Eliminated
Smiley	7	Stella Anița	"I'm Outta Love"	Smiley's choice
Marius Moga	8	Elena Șalaru	"Waterfalls"	Eliminated
Horia Brenciu	9	Georgia Dascălu	"Ain't No Other Man"	Brenciu's choice
Loredana Groza	10	Marius Marin	"September"	Public vote
Smiley	11	Nicoleta Țicală	"Run to You"	Eliminated
Marius Moga	12	Felix Burdușa	"I'll Make Love to You"	Moga's choice
Horia Brenciu	13	Mihai Chițu	"One More Try"	Public vote
Loredana Groza	14	Muneer al-Obeidli	"Desert Rose"	Loredana's choice
Smiley	15	Adrian Nour	"La bohème"	Public vote
Marius Moga	16	Sânziana Niculae	"Give Me One Reason"	Public vote

Non-competition performances
Order	Performer	Song
1	Smiley and Dorian	"Can I Get A..."
2	Edi Stancu Dance Crew	"Bang Bang"
3	Julie Mayaya and Zaza Band	"Stay"

=== Quarterfinals (Week 3) ===
All 16 remaining contestants competed in the third live show on Saturday, December 14, 2013. Voting proceeded as before.

Episode 12 (December 14)
Coach	Order	Artist	Song	Result
Marius Moga	1	Andi Grasu	"Don't Stop Me Now"	Eliminated
Loredana Groza	2	Alina Dorobanțu	"Jolene"	Eliminated
Horia Brenciu	3	Georgia Dascălu	"Because You Loved Me"	Eliminated
Smiley	4	Adrian Nour	"Buona sera signorina"	Smiley's choice
Loredana Groza	5	Florin Mândru	"Runaway Train"	Eliminated
Marius Moga	6	Jovana Milovanović	"I Will Always Love You"	Moga's choice
Horia Brenciu	7	Denisa Moșincat	"All I Want for Christmas Is You"	Eliminated
Smiley	8	Stella Anița	"Hallelujah"	Eliminated
Marius Moga	9	Sânziana Niculae	"The Show Must Go On"	Public vote
Loredana Groza	10	Marius Marin	"Nights in White Satin"	Public vote
Horia Brenciu	11	Ana-Maria Mirică	"Flashdance... What a Feeling"	Brenciu's choice
Smiley	12	Iolanda Moldoveanu	"It's Raining Men"	Eliminated
Loredana Groza	13	Muneer al-Obeidli	"Hello"	Loredana's choice
Smiley	14	Claudia Iuga	"Stop!"	Public vote
Marius Moga	15	Felix Burdușa	"Breathe Easy"	Eliminated
Horia Brenciu	16	Mihai Chițu	"I Don't Want to Miss a Thing"	Public vote

Non-competition performances
Order	Performer	Song
1	Horia Brenciu	"Hello"
2	Baletul Edi Stancu	"Happy"
3	Daniel Dragomir	"Niciodată nu e de ajuns"

=== Semi-final (Week 4) ===
All eight remaining contestants performed two songs each in the semi-final on Saturday, December 21, 2016. Within each team, the coach and the viewers each had a 50/50 say; the contestant with the highest combined score went on to the final.

Episode 13 (December 21)
Coach	Artist	Order	First Song	Order	Second Song	Result
Smiley	Claudia Iuga	1	"Iarna (Milioane)"	9	"We Don't Need Another Hero (Thunderdome)"	Eliminated
Marius Moga	Jovana Milovanović	2	"O Holy Night"	10	"Bleeding Love"	Eliminated
Horia Brenciu	Ana-Maria Mirică	3	"Theme from New York, New York"	11	"Vis de iarnă"	Eliminated
Loredana Groza	Muneer al-Obeidli	4	"Sanie cu zurgălăi"	12	"Talk Dirty" / "Nour el ain"	Eliminated
Smiley	Adrian Nour	5	"Joy to the World"	13	"The Blower's Daughter"	Advanced
Marius Moga	Sânziana Niculae	6	"Santa Claus Is Comin' to Town"	14	"Georgia on My Mind"	Advanced
Horia Brenciu	Mihai Chițu	7	"La Viflaim, colo-n jos"	15	"Delilah"	Advanced
Loredana Groza	Marius Marin	8	"It's Not Unusual"	16	"Everybody Loves Somebody"	Advanced

Non-competition performances
Order	Performer	Song
1	Loredana and Carla's Dreams	"Lumea ta"
2	Baletul Edi Stancu	Medley of folk and trance music
3	Liviu Teodorescu	"Ești piesă"

Results
Coach	Finalist		Coach/televote percentages	Eliminated	
Smiley	Adrian Nour	117%	50% 50%	83%	Claudia Iuga
Smiley	Adrian Nour	117%	67% 33%	83%	Claudia Iuga
Marius Moga	Sânziana Niculae	113%	50% 50%	87%	Jovana Milovanović
Marius Moga	Sânziana Niculae	113%	63% 37%	87%	Jovana Milovanović
Horia Brenciu	Mihai Chițu	117%	50% 50%	83%	Ana-Maria Mirică
Horia Brenciu	Mihai Chițu	117%	67% 33%	83%	Ana-Maria Mirică
Loredana Groza	Marius Marin	114%	50% 50%	86%	Muneer al-Obeidli
Loredana Groza	Marius Marin	114%	64% 36%	86%	Muneer al-Obeidli

=== Week 5: final (December 26) ===
The top 4 contestants performed in the grand final on Thursday, December 26, 2013. This week, the four finalists performed a solo song, a duet with their coach and a duet with a famous singer. The public vote determined the winner, and that resulted in a victory for Mihai Chițu, Horia Brenciu's second consecutive victory as a coach.

Episode 14 (December 26)
Coach	Artist	Order	Solo song	Order	Duet song (with coach)	Order	Duet song (with famous singer)	Result
Horia Brenciu	Mihai Chițu	7	"Caruso"	1	"'O sole mio"	11	Medley (with Corina Chiriac): "O clipă de sinceritate" "Păi de ce?" "Ne cunoaștem din vedere" "Unde erai?" "Opriți timpul"	Winner
Loredana Groza	Marius Marin	2	"Rhythm of My Heart"	9	"Unforgettable"	5	"Cântec pentru prieteni" (with Paul Ciuci)	Fourth place
Smiley	Adrian Nour	10	"Loucura"	6	"I Can't Dance"	3	"A Whole New World" (with Sore)	Third place
Marius Moga	Sânziana Niculae	12	"Killing Me Softly with His Song"	4	"Hips Don't Lie"	8	"Who Wants to Live Forever" (with Bodo)	Runner-up

Non-competition performances
Order	Performer	Song
1	Angelo, Andrei Chermeleu, Răzvan, Andrei Loică, George, Ana-Maria, Georgia, Iolanda, Iulia, Stella, Muneer, Felix, Alina, Dana, Jovana, Claudia, Florin Ilinca, Aurel, Andrei Hanghiuc, Florin Mândru	"Oh Happy Day"
2	Georgia Dascălu	"Ambition"
3	DeM'Boyz*	"One Way or Another (Teenage Kicks)"
4	Shift and Imre Vízi	"După ani și ani"
5	Loredana Groza	"It's Magic"
6	Mihai Chițu and Horia Brenciu	"'O sole mio" (winning reprise)

* Band that consists of Felix Burdușa, Andrei Loică and Angelo Simonică, former Team Moga contestants.

Results
Place	Coach	Artist	Result
1	Horia Brenciu	Mihai Chițu	37.34%
2	Marius Moga	Sânziana Niculae	36.56%
3	Smiley	Adrian Nour	?
4	Loredana Groza	Marius Marin	?

== Elimination chart ==
Color key
Artist info

- Artist from Team Brenciu
- Artist from Team Loredana
- Artist from Team Smiley
- Artist from Team Moga

Result details

- Winner
- Runner-up
- Third place
- Fourth place
- Artist was saved by the public vote
- Artist was saved by their coach
- Artist was eliminated

=== Overall ===
#	Week 1	Week 2	Week 3	Week 4	Final
Mihai Chițu	—N/a	Safe	Safe	Safe (117 p.)	Winner (37.34%)
Sânziana Niculae	—N/a	Safe	Safe	Safe (113 p.)	Runner-up (36.56%)
Adrian Nour	—N/a	Safe	Safe	Safe (117 p.)	3rd place
Marius Marin	—N/a	Safe	Safe	Safe (114 p.)	4th place
Jovana Milovanović	Safe	—N/a	Safe	Eliminated (87 p.)	Eliminated (5th – 8th)
Muneer al-Obeidli	—N/a	Safe	Safe	Eliminated (86 p.)	Eliminated (5th – 8th)
Claudia Iuga	Safe	—N/a	Safe	Eliminated (83 p.)	Eliminated (5th – 8th)
Ana-Maria Mirică	Safe	—N/a	Safe	Eliminated (83 p.)	Eliminated (5th – 8th)
Stella Anița	—N/a	Safe	Eliminated	Eliminated (Week 3)	
Iolanda Moldoveanu	—N/a	Safe	Eliminated	Eliminated (Week 3)	
Georgia Dascălu	—N/a	Safe	Eliminated	Eliminated (Week 3)	
Denisa Moșincat	Safe	—N/a	Eliminated	Eliminated (Week 3)	
Alina Dorobanțu	Safe	—N/a	Eliminated	Eliminated (Week 3)	
Florin Mândru	Safe	—N/a	Eliminated	Eliminated (Week 3)	
Felix Burdușa	Safe	—N/a	Eliminated	Eliminated (Week 3)	
Andi Grasu	Safe	—N/a	Eliminated	Eliminated (Week 3)	
Angelo Simonică	—N/a	Eliminated	Eliminated (Week 2)		
Elena Șalaru	—N/a	Eliminated	Eliminated (Week 2)		
Nicoleta Țicală	—N/a	Eliminated	Eliminated (Week 2)		
George Secioreanu	—N/a	Eliminated	Eliminated (Week 2)		
Andrei Chermeleu	—N/a	Eliminated	Eliminated (Week 2)		
Kinga Farkas	—N/a	Eliminated	Eliminated (Week 2)		
Árpi Török	—N/a	Eliminated	Eliminated (Week 2)		
Florin Ilinca	—N/a	Eliminated	Eliminated (Week 2)		
Andrei Loica	Eliminated	Eliminated (Week 1)			
Dana Torop	Eliminated	Eliminated (Week 1)			
Iulia Dumitrache	Eliminated	Eliminated (Week 1)			
Aurel Niamțu	Eliminated	Eliminated (Week 1)			
Andrei Hanghiuc	Eliminated	Eliminated (Week 1)			
Florin Timbuc	Eliminated	Eliminated (Week 1)			
Lucian Frâncu	Eliminated	Eliminated (Week 1)			
Răzvan Alexa	Eliminated	Eliminated (Week 1)			

== Controversies ==
Giulio Vasilescu, a contestant in episode 2, claimed that his audition song (which he felt put him at a disadvantage) had been imposed upon him. None of the coaches pressed the "I WANT YOU" button.

The Vocea României production team was accused of nepotism in the case of contestant Muneer al-Obeidli by people who stated that Al-Obeidli had had a relationship with one of the producers, Roxana Paulică, and a long-lasting friendship with producer Mona Segall. Al-Obeidli was eliminated in the semi-final.

Contestant Romeo Zaharia, eliminated in episode 7 by Loredana after his duet with Aurel Niamțu, expressed his dissatisfaction with the coach's choice, claiming that the contest was staged and that Niamțu had been positively discriminated for the sake of diversity. Nico, a friend of Zaharia, has stated that he had threatened to jump off the building, in response to the result.

Niamțu, eliminated in episode 10 by his coach, Loredana Groza, claimed that Horia Brenciu, who had noted that all of his performances fell into a single musical genre, the romance, had unfairly and repeatedly criticized him as an excuse to solve a personal dispute with Groza. The contestant has also stated that he considered Brenciu an arrogant, valueless person, even having a live argument with him in the evening of his elimination. Other contestants claimed, on the contrary, that it was Niamțu who was arrogant and that his behavior was difficult to tolerate. In 2014, Niamțu accused ProTV, saying that they had intentionally rejected his son, Ionuț, who had signed up for the fourth season of the show.

== Ratings ==
Phase	#	Original airdate	Timeslot (EEST / EET)	National				Urban				18–49			Source
Phase	#	Original airdate	Timeslot (EEST / EET)	Rk	Avg (000)	Rtg (%)	Shr (%)	Rk	Avg (000)	Rtg (%)	Shr (%)	Rk	Avg (000)	Rtg (%)	Source
Blind auditions	1	September 28, 2013	Saturday, 8:30 PM	1	2,182	11.5	23.1	1	1,307	12.5	25.7	1	765	13.7	
Blind auditions	2	October 5, 2013	Saturday, 8:30 PM	1	2,242	11.8	21.6	1	1,251	11.9	22.3	1	819	14.7	
Blind auditions	3	October 12, 2013	Saturday, 8:30 PM	1	2,253	11.8	22.3	1	1,257	12.0	23.4	1	813	14.6	
Blind auditions	4	October 19, 2013	Saturday, 8:30 PM	1	2,238	11.8	22.5	1	1,288	12.3	24.2	1	766	13.7	
Blind auditions	5	October 26, 2013	Saturday, 8:30 PM	1	2,878	15.1	27.9	1	1,678	16.0	30.2	1	956	17.1	
Blind auditions	6	November 2, 2013	Saturday, 8:30 PM	1	2,540	13.4	26.0	1	1,514	14.4	27.7	1	882	15.8	
Battles	7	November 9, 2013	Saturday, 8:30 PM	1	2,615	13.7	—N/a	1	1,481	14.1	29.0	1	890	15.9	
Battles	8	November 16, 2013	Saturday, 8:30 PM	1	2,319	12.2	24.7	1	1,410	13.4	26.4	1	739	13.2	
Battles	9	November 23, 2013	Saturday, 8:30 PM	1	2,334	12.3	24.3	1	1,408	13.4	27.2	1	853	15.3	
Live shows	10	December 1, 2013	Sunday, 8:30 PM	1	1,606	8.4	19.5	1	1,103	10.5	22.6	1	552	9.9	
Live shows	11	December 7, 2013	Saturday, 8:30 PM	1	1,767	9.3	20.2	1	1,162	11.1	23.9	1	580	10.4	
Live shows	12	December 14, 2013	Saturday, 8:30 PM	1	1,622	8.5	19.6	1	1,001	9.5	22.2	1	529	9.5	
Semi-final	13	December 21, 2013	Saturday, 8:30 PM	1	1,716	9.0	20.3	1	994	9.5	21.6	1	600	10.7	
Final	14	December 26, 2013	Thursday, 8:30 PM	1	1,803	9.5	—N/a	1	1,013	9.7	—N/a	1	552	9.8	
