= Romania in the Eurovision Song Contest 2017 =

- Eurovision Song Contest 2017
- Participating broadcaster: Televiziunea Română (TVR)
- Country: Romania
- Selection process: Selecția Națională 2017
- Selection date: 5 March 2017

Competing entry
- Song: "Yodel It!"
- Artist: Ilinca feat. Alex Florea
- Songwriters: Mihai Alexandru; Alexandra Niculae

Placement
- Semi-final result: Qualified (6th, 174 points)
- Final result: 7th, 282 points

Participation chronology

Romania was represented at the Eurovision Song Contest 2017 with the song "Yodel It!" written by Mihai Alexandru and Alexandra Niculae. The song was performed by Ilinca and Alex Florea. In October 2016, the Romanian broadcaster Televiziunea Română (TVR) announced that they would be returning to the Eurovision Song Contest after a one-year absence following their forced withdrawal in 2016 due to repeated non-payment of debts to the European Broadcasting Union (EBU). TVR organised the national final Selecția Națională 2017 in order to select the Romanian entry for the 2017 contest in Kyiv, Ukraine. The national final consisted of two shows: a semi-final and a final. Fifteen entries were selected to compete in the semi-final on 26 February 2017 where a five-member jury panel selected ten entries to advance to the final. The ten qualifiers competed in the final on 5 March 2017 where "Yodel It!" performed by Ilinca and Alex Florea was selected as the winner entirely by a public vote.

Romania was drawn to compete in the second semi-final of the Eurovision Song Contest which took place on 11 May 2017. Performing during the show in position 5, "Yodel It!" was announced among the top 10 entries of the second semi-final and therefore qualified to compete in the final on 13 May. It was later revealed that Romania placed sixth out of the 18 participating countries in the semi-final with 174 points. In the final, Romania performed in position 20 and placed seventh out of the 26 participating countries, scoring 282 points.

== Background ==
Prior to the 2017 contest, Romania had participated in the Eurovision Song Contest 17 times since its first entry in 1994. To this point, its highest placing in the contest has been third place, which the nation achieved on two occasions: in 2005 with the song "Let Me Try" performed by Luminița Anghel and Sistem, and in 2010 with the song "Playing with Fire" performed by Paula Seling and Ovi. To this point, Romania has qualified to the final on every occasion since the introduction of semi-finals to the format of the contest in 2004. In 2015, "De la capăt" by band Voltaj placed 15th in the final.

The Romanian national broadcaster, Televiziunea Română (TVR), broadcasts the event within Romania and organizes the selection process for the nation's entry. TVR has consistently selected the Romanian Eurovision entry through national finals that feature a competition among several artists and songs. After consistently being present for every contest since 2002, the European Broadcasting Union (EBU) announced in April 2016 that the nation had been removed from the contest due to repeated non-payment of debts by TVR to the EBU, making the 2016 Romanian entry, "Moment of Silence" by Ovidiu Anton, become ineligible to compete. Following their forced one-year absence, the broadcaster confirmed their intentions to participate at the 2017 Eurovision Song Contest on 13 October 2016 after submitting an application to participate on 21 September 2016. TVR had set up national finals with several artists to choose both the song and performer to compete at Eurovision for Romania, a procedure which the broadcaster opted for once again to select their 2017 entry.

== Before Eurovision ==
=== Selecția Națională 2017 ===
Selecția Națională 2017 was the national final organised by TVR in order to select Romania's entry for the Eurovision Song Contest 2017. The competition consisted of two shows: a semi-final featuring fifteen songs and a final featuring ten songs to be held on 26 February and 5 March 2017, respectively. Both shows took place at the Studioul Pangratti in Bucharest and were hosted by Iuliana Tudor and Dan Helciug with Ioana Voicu hosting segments from the green room. The producers of the competition were Iuliana Marciuc and Bogdan Ghiţulescu, the former who was also appointed as the head of the Romanian delegation at the Eurovision Song Contest, while the director of the shows was Aurel Badea. The two shows were televised on TVR1, TVR HD, TVRi as well as online via the broadcaster's streaming service TVR+ and YouTube. The two shows were also broadcast in Moldova via the channel TVR Moldova.

==== Competing entries ====
TVR opened a submission period for artists and composers to submit their entries between 20 December 2016 and 22 January 2017. The broadcaster received 84 submissions after the submission deadline passed, of which 72 participated in auditions held between 27 and 29 January 2017 at the TVR Studio 3 in Bucharest. The auditions were later broadcast on TVR2, TVR HD, TVRi and TVR Moldova between 5 and 11 February 2017. A jury panel consisting of Andrei Tudor (composer), Paula Seling (singer, represented Romania in the Eurovision Song Contest 2010 and 2014), Ovi (singer-songwriter, represented Romania in the Eurovision Song Contest 2010 and 2014), Luminița Anghel (singer, represented Romania in the Eurovision Song Contest 2005) and Adrian Romcescu (composer, conductor) reviewed the performances during the auditions and rated each song between 1 (lowest) and 10 (highest) based on criteria such as the melodic harmony and structure of the song, the orchestral arrangement, originality and stylistic diversity of the composition and sound and voice quality. After the combination of the jury votes, the top fifteen entries that scored the highest were selected for the national final. TVR hosted a presentation show, televised on TVR HD, TVRi and TVR Moldova on 12 February 2017, where the competing entries were announced. Among the competing artists was Mihai, who previously represented Romania in the Eurovision Song Contest in 2006. It was revealed during the show that "I Know" performed by Lora had initially been selected for the national final but was withdrawn from the competition following the auditions. The entry was replaced with the song "Două sticle" performed by Zanga.

Artist	Song	Songwriter(s)
Alexandra Crăescu	"Hope"	Carlos Manuel De Abreu Fernandes
Ana-Maria Mirică	"Spune-mi tu"	Liviu Elekes, Roxana Elekes
Cristina Vasiu	"Set the Skies on Fire"	Jonas Thander, Calle Kindbom, Tony Sánchez-Ohlsson
D-lema	"Adventure"	Alex Luft, Denisa Demian
Eduard Santha	"Wild Child"	Eduard Santha, Marius Alexandru Pop
Elizé and No Stress	"Fără bariere"	Vladimir Pocorschi, Eliza Manda
Ilinca feat. Alex Florea	"Yodel It!"	Mihai Alexandru, Alexandra Niculae
Instinct	"Petale"	Daniel Alexandrescu, Vlad Alecu, Theea Eliza Miculescu
Maxim feat. Nicolae Voiculeț	"Adu-ți aminte"	Adrian Sînă, Nicolae Voiculeț, Anca Cojocaru, Andrei Vitan
Mihai	"I Won't Surrender"	Mihai Trăistariu, Michael James Down, Primož Poglajen, Niklas Hast
Ramona Nerra	"Save Me"	Ramona Nerra, Terri Bjerre, Toddi Reed
Tavi Colen and Emma	"We Own the Night"	Anastasia Sandu, Cătălin Tuță-Popescu
Tudor Turcu	"Limitless"	Bogdan Tomoșoiu, Tudor Turcu, Marius Marin
Xandra	"Walk On By"	Jonas Gladnikoff, Will Taylor
Zanga	"Două sticle"	Alexandra Penciu

==== Semi-final ====
The semi-final took place on 26 February 2017. Fifteen songs competed and a jury panel selected ten songs to qualify to the final. The members of the jury panel that voted during the semi-final were: Andrei Tudor (composer), Paula Seling (singer, represented Romania in the Eurovision Song Contest 2010 and 2014), Ovi (singer-songwriter, represented Romania in the Eurovision Song Contest 2010 and 2014), Luminița Anghel (singer, represented Romania in the Eurovision Song Contest 2005) and Adrian Romcescu (composer, conductor).

Semi-final – 26 February 2017
R/O	Artist	Song	Jury Votes					Total	Place
R/O	Artist	Song	A. Tudor	P. Seling	Ovi	L. Anghel	A. Romcescu	Total	Place
1	Elizé and No Stress	"Fără bariere"			2	3	2	7	11
2	Cristina Vasiu	"Set the Skies on Fire"	7	7	4	7	7	32	4
3	Tudor Turcu	"Limitless"		5			1	6	12
4	Ramona Nerra	"Save Me"	3	1	3	6	6	19	6
5	Instinct	"Petale"	6	3	5	5	5	24	5
6	Eduard Santha	"Wild Child"	2	6	7	4		19	7
7	Tavi Colen and Emma	"We Own the Night"	1		1	2	4	8	9
8	Zanga	"Două sticle"	5					5	13
9	Ilinca feat. Alex Florea	"Yodel It!"	12	12	12	12	12	60	1
10	Alexandra Crăescu	"Hope"		4		1		5	14
11	Maxim feat. Nicolae Voiculeț	"Adu-ți aminte"		2	6			8	8
12	D-lema	"Adventure"						0	15
13	Mihai	"I Won't Surrender"	10	8	10	8	8	44	3
14	Ana-Maria Mirică	"Spune-mi tu"	4				3	7	10
15	Xandra	"Walk On By"	8	10	8	10	10	46	2

==== Final ====
The final took place on 5 March 2017. Ten songs competed and the winner, "Yodel It!" performed by Ilinca feat. Alex Florea, was selected exclusively by public televoting. In addition to the performances of the competing entries, the interval acts featured performances by 2017 Spanish Eurovision entrant Manel Navarro performing his Eurovision song "Do It for Your Lover", 2017 Moldovan Eurovision entrants SunStroke Project performing their Eurovision song "Hey Mamma", 2017 Swiss Eurovision entrants Timebelle performing their Eurovision song "Apollo", as well as performances by the ABBA tribute band Arrival.

Final – 5 March 2017
R/O	Artist	Song	Televote	Place
1	Ana-Maria Mirică	"Spune-mi tu"	913	10
2	Ilinca feat. Alex Florea	"Yodel It!"	10,377	1
3	Eduard Santha	"Wild Child"	1,331	8
4	Xandra	"Walk On By"	2,556	5
5	Mihai	"I Won't Surrender"	5,201	2
6	Maxim feat. Nicolae Voiculeț	"Adu-ți aminte"	2,801	4
7	Tavi Colen and Emma	"We Own the Night"	1,128	9
8	Instinct	"Petale"	3,063	3
9	Ramona Nerra	"Save Me"	2,102	7
10	Cristina Vasiu	"Set the Skies on Fire"	2,222	6

=== Promotion ===
Ilinca and Alex Florea made several appearances across Europe to specifically promote "Yodel It!" as the Romanian Eurovision entry. On 2 April, Ilinca and Alex Florea performed during the London Eurovision Party, which was held at the Café de Paris venue in London, United Kingdom and hosted by Nicki French. Between 3 and 6 April, they took part in promotional activities in Tel Aviv, Israel and performed during the Israel Calling event held at the Ha'teatron venue. On 8 April, they performed during the Eurovision in Concert event which was held at the Melkweg venue in Amsterdam, Netherlands and hosted by Cornald Maas and Selma Björnsdóttir. On 17 April, they performed during the Eurovision Spain Pre-Party, which was held at the Sala La Riviera venue in Madrid, Spain.

== At Eurovision ==
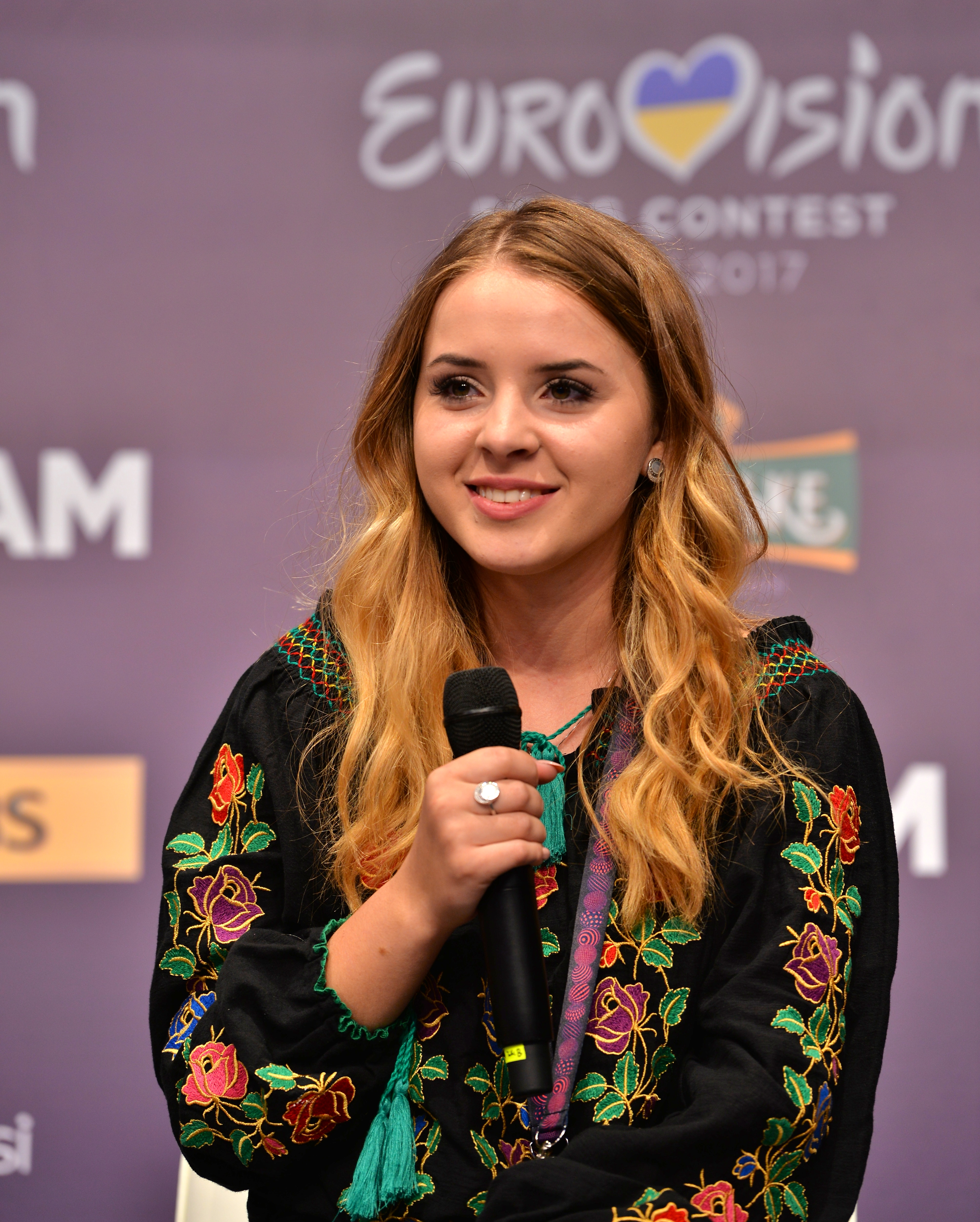
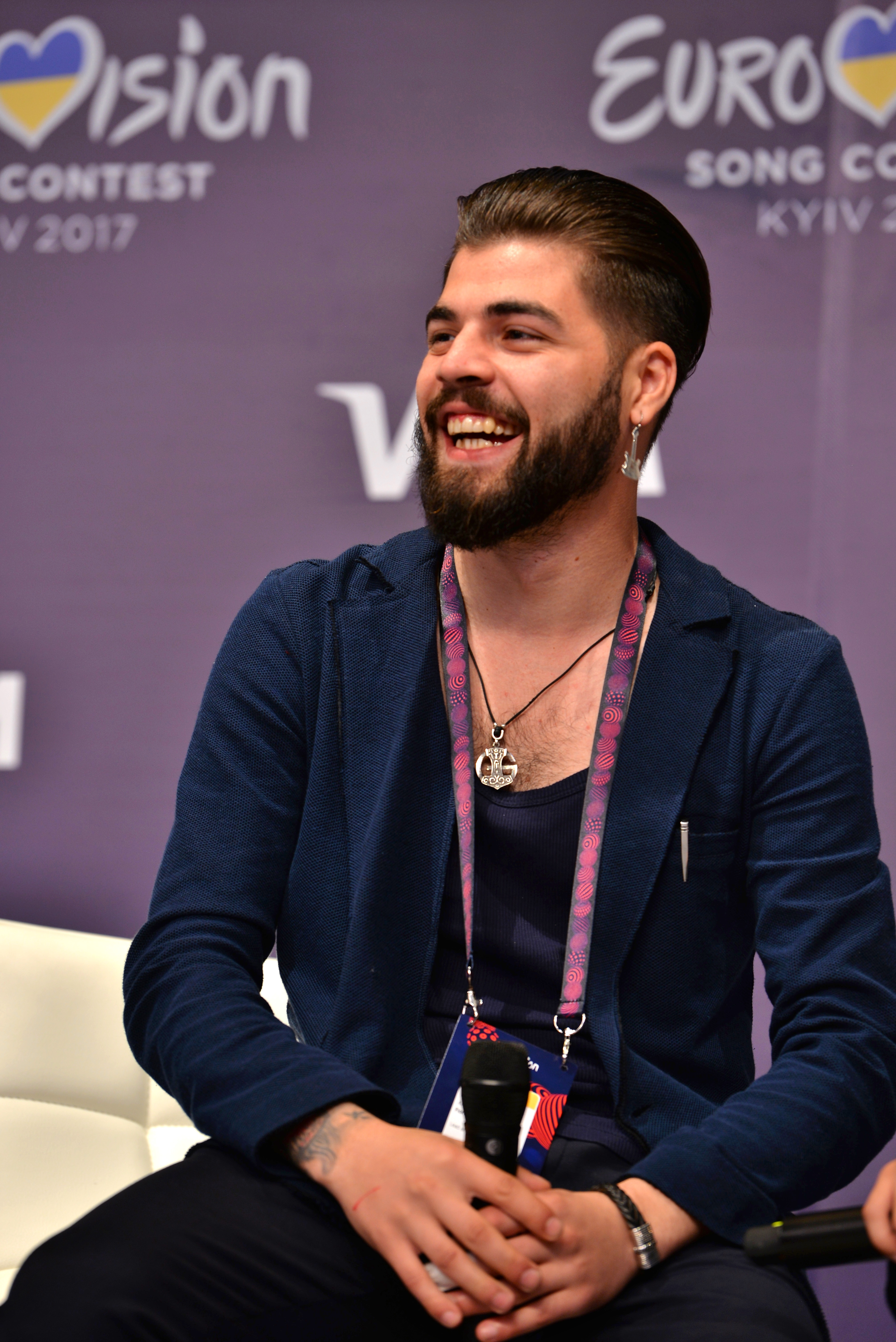
Ilinca and Alex Florea during a press meet and greet

According to Eurovision rules, all nations with the exceptions of the host country and the "Big Five" (France, Germany, Italy, Spain and the United Kingdom) are required to qualify from one of two semi-finals in order to compete for the final; the top ten countries from each semi-final progress to the final. The European Broadcasting Union (EBU) split up the competing countries into six different pots based on voting patterns from previous contests, with countries with favourable voting histories put into the same pot. On 31 January 2017, an allocation draw was held which placed each country into one of the two semi-finals, as well as which half of the show they would perform in. Romania was placed into the second semi-final, to be held on 11 May 2017, and was scheduled to perform in the first half of the show.

Once all the competing songs for the 2017 contest had been released, the running order for the semi-finals was decided by the shows' producers rather than through another draw, so that similar songs were not placed next to each other. Romania was set to perform in position 6, following the entry from Malta and before the entry from the Netherlands. However, following Russia's withdrawal from the contest on 13 April and subsequent removal from the running order of the second semi-final, Romania's performing position shifted to 5.

All three shows were broadcast in Romania on TVR1, TVRi and TVR HD with commentary by Liana Stanciu and Radu Andrei Tudor. The Romanian spokesperson, who announced the top 12-point score awarded by the Romanian jury during the final, was Sonia Argint-Ionescu.

=== Semi-final ===
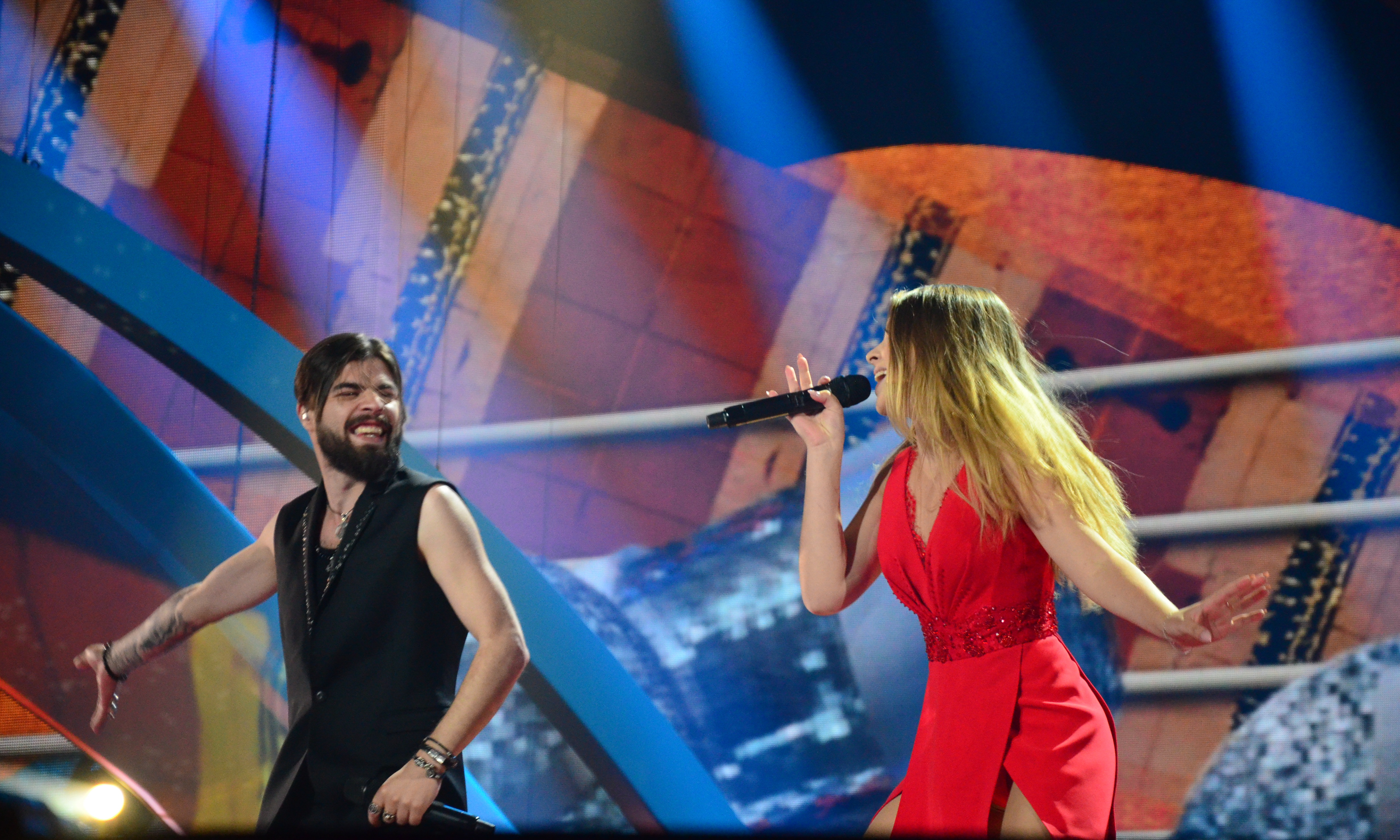
Ilinca and Alex Florea during a rehearsal before the second semi-final

Ilinca and Alex Florea took part in technical rehearsals on 2 and 5 May, followed by dress rehearsals on 10 and 11 May. This included the jury show on 10 May where the professional juries of each country watched and voted on the competing entries.

The stage show featured Ilinca wearing a short red dress and Alex Florea dressed in a black outfit with two glittery cannons, which according to the singers represent an "explosion of love and happiness" and the reinforcement of the message of love, placed on stage. The background LED screens displayed a number of large toy soldiers drumming in the background, which later transitioned to colorful imagery including butterflies, clouds, roses, musical notes and letters showing the title of the song "Yodel It!" in different tones. The singers performed in a yellow circle with Florea pushing out and jumping on one of the cannons towards the end of the performance. A backing vocalist, Cristian Goaie who is Florea's brother, was also part of the performance.

At the end of the show, Romania was announced as having finished in the top ten and subsequently qualifying for the grand final. It was later revealed that Romania placed sixth in the semi-final, receiving a total of 174 points: 148 points from the televoting and 26 points from the juries.

=== Final ===
Shortly after the second semi-final, a winners' press conference was held for the ten qualifying countries. As part of this press conference, the qualifying artists took part in a draw to determine which half of the grand final they would subsequently participate in. This draw was done in the reverse order the countries appeared in the semi-final running order. Romania was drawn to compete in the second half. Following this draw, the shows' producers decided upon the running order of the final, as they had done for the semi-finals. Romania was subsequently placed to perform in position 20, following the entry from Cyprus and before the entry from Germany.

Ilinca and Alex Florea once again took part in dress rehearsals on 12 and 13 May before the final, including the jury final where the professional juries cast their final votes before the live show. The singers performed a repeat of their semi-final performance during the final on 13 May. Romania placed seventh in the final, scoring 282 points: 224 points from the televoting and 58 points from the juries.

=== Voting ===
Voting during the three shows involved each country awarding two sets of points from 1-8, 10 and 12: one from their professional jury and the other from televoting. Each nation's jury consisted of five music industry professionals who are citizens of the country they represent, with their names published before the contest to ensure transparency. This jury judged each entry based on: vocal capacity; the stage performance; the song's composition and originality; and the overall impression by the act. In addition, no member of a national jury was permitted to be related in any way to any of the competing acts in such a way that they cannot vote impartially and independently. The individual rankings of each jury member as well as the nation's televoting results were released shortly after the grand final.

Below is a breakdown of points awarded to Romania and awarded by Romania in the second semi-final and grand final of the contest, and the breakdown of the jury voting and televoting conducted during the two shows:

==== Points awarded to Romania ====
Points awarded to Romania (Semi-final 2)
Score	Televote	Jury
12 points	Estonia; France	
10 points	Israel	Macedonia
8 points	Denmark; Ireland; Netherlands; Norway; San Marino	
7 points	Austria; Bulgaria; Croatia; Germany; Hungary; Malta; Switzerland	
6 points	Lithuania; Serbia	
5 points	Belarus; Ukraine	
4 points		Ireland; Malta; Ukraine
3 points	Macedonia	Israel
2 points		
1 point		Netherlands

Points awarded to Romania (Final)
Score	Televote	Jury
12 points	Ireland; Moldova	Moldova
10 points	Australia; Austria; France; Italy; Norway	Montenegro
8 points	Bulgaria	Ireland
7 points	Israel; Netherlands; Poland; Portugal; Spain; United Kingdom	
6 points	Belgium; Croatia; Czech Republic; Estonia; Germany; Hungary; Malta; San Marino	Greece
5 points	Iceland; Latvia	Malta
4 points	Albania; Cyprus; Denmark; Lithuania; Serbia; Switzerland	Macedonia
3 points	Finland; Sweden; Ukraine	Albania; Azerbaijan; Bulgaria; Latvia
2 points	Armenia; Azerbaijan; Belarus; Slovenia	
1 point	Greece	Netherlands

==== Points awarded by Romania ====
Points awarded by Romania (Semi-final 2)
Score	Televote	Jury
12 points	Hungary	Netherlands
10 points	Switzerland	Denmark
8 points	Bulgaria	Bulgaria
7 points	Israel	Croatia
6 points	Ireland	Switzerland
5 points	Croatia	Austria
4 points	Austria	Israel
3 points	Estonia	Ireland
2 points	Norway	Norway
1 point	Belarus	Malta

Points awarded by Romania (Final)
Score	Televote	Jury
12 points	Moldova	Netherlands
10 points	Hungary	Bulgaria
8 points	Bulgaria	Moldova
7 points	Portugal	Sweden
6 points	Italy	Portugal
5 points	Belgium	Denmark
4 points	France	Australia
3 points	Croatia	Croatia
2 points	Sweden	Israel
1 point	Greece	Austria

==== Detailed voting results ====
The following members comprised the Romanian jury:

- Luminița Anghel (jury chairperson) – artist, represented Romania in the 2005 contest
- Mihai Trăistariu – singer, producer, composer, represented Romania in the 2006 contest
- Octavian Călugăru (Tavi Colen) – artist
- Paula Seling – singer-songwriter, musician, record producer, composer, radio DJ, TV personality, represented in the 2010 and 2014 contests with Ovi
- Florin Cezar Ouatu (Cezar) – pop-opera singer, represented Romania in the 2013 contest

Detailed voting results from Romania (Semi-final 2)
R/O	Country	Jury							Televote	
R/O	Country	L. Anghel	M. Trăistariu	T. Colen	P. Seling	C. Ouatu	Rank	Points	Rank	Points
01	Serbia	11	10	11	9	17	12		14	
02	Austria	5	8	5	8	3	6	5	7	4
03	Macedonia	15	12	13	14	9	13		11	
04	Malta	8	3	12	10	16	10	1	15	
05	Romania									
06	Netherlands	2	1	1	2	1	1	12	12	
07	Hungary	12	14	16	13	13	14		1	12
08	Denmark	1	6	3	1	2	2	10	13	
09	Ireland	13	4	10	6	11	8	3	5	6
10	San Marino	16	17	17	17	12	17		17	
11	Croatia	3	5	6	4	4	4	7	6	5
12	Norway	9	11	7	11	8	9	2	9	2
13	Switzerland	6	9	2	5	7	5	6	2	10
14	Belarus	10	13	9	7	10	11		10	1
15	Bulgaria	4	2	4	3	6	3	8	3	8
16	Lithuania	14	16	14	15	14	15		16	
17	Estonia	17	15	15	16	15	16		8	3
18	Israel	7	7	8	12	5	7	4	4	7

Detailed voting results from Romania (Final)
R/O	Country	Jury							Televote	
R/O	Country	L. Anghel	M. Trăistariu	T. Colen	P. Seling	C. Ouatu	Rank	Points	Rank	Points
01	Israel	7	14	9	14	5	9	2	12	
02	Poland	15	21	21	17	17	19		25	
03	Belarus	12	17	14	9	16	14		21	
04	Austria	8	13	12	13	10	10	1	17	
05	Armenia	23	20	13	23	25	22		13	
06	Netherlands	3	2	1	1	2	1	12	18	
07	Moldova	2	1	2	4	3	3	8	1	12
08	Hungary	10	11	22	7	11	12		2	10
09	Italy	14	18	20	19	13	16		5	6
10	Denmark	5	8	7	3	9	6	5	23	
11	Portugal	9	5	6	5	4	5	6	4	7
12	Azerbaijan	19	16	16	16	23	18		20	
13	Croatia	6	10	11	8	8	8	3	8	3
14	Australia	11	4	8	12	7	7	4	16	
15	Greece	22	19	19	24	18	20		10	1
16	Spain	20	25	25	25	22	24		22	
17	Norway	13	12	10	10	12	11		14	
18	United Kingdom	18	6	15	15	15	15		19	
19	Cyprus	16	15	23	18	14	17		11	
20	Romania									
21	Germany	24	22	17	21	19	21		15	
22	Ukraine	21	24	18	20	21	23		24	
23	Belgium	17	9	5	11	20	13		6	5
24	Sweden	4	7	4	6	6	4	7	9	2
25	Bulgaria	1	3	3	2	1	2	10	3	8
26	France	25	23	24	22	24	25		7	4

== See also ==
- List of music released by Romanian artists that has charted in major music markets
