= Ramona Nerra =

Romanian singer and songwriter (born 1979)

- Born: June 9, 1979 (age 47); Craiova, Romania
- Occupations: Singer, songwriter
- Years active: 2001–present
- Label: just B! Music

Ramona Nerra (born 9 June 1979 in Craiova) is a Romanian singer and songwriter who lives in Cologne, Germany. She rose to fame after her participation at The Voice of Germany in 2011 and at Vocea României in 2016, reaching the semifinals on both occasions. The singer tried to represent Romania at the Eurovision Song Contest multiple times, eventually reaching seventh place in the final round of the Selecția Națională in 2017 with "Save Me".

== Career ==
Nerra was born 9 June 1979 in Craiova, Romania. She showed special interest in singing and music from a young age, which resulted in her joining the kid's club, a children's and artist development program organised by the State of Romania. At the age of 14, she was accepted into the "Romanian School of Arts", although students under 16 years were not allowed. She eventually studied at the "University of Theatre and Film" in Bucharest, Romania from 1999 to 2003. Meanwhile, she moved to Germany in 2000 and formed a duo with Nicoleta Luciu in 2001 called Alize, which found major success in their native Romania. They disbanded after two years.

By 2005, she found success in the live music scene of Cologne, Germany. This resulted in her supporting singers like Lionel Richie, Joe Cocker, Bonnie Tyler, Chris de Burgh, Johnny Logan, Jennifer Rush or Gloria Gaynor. In 2009, she met Düsseldorf band "Fresh Music Live" and its management; she has since had concerts throughout Europe with artists like Kelly Rowland, Nicole Scherzinger, Tiësto, Shaggy, Mousse T., Anastacia and Natasha Bedingfield. The singer took part at The Voice of Germany in 2011, where she reached the semifinals. She also recorded two songs with German disc jockey ATB, "Never Give Up" and "In and Out of Love", and toured with him in the United States. Nerra eventually took part at Vocea României in 2016, where she also made it to the semifinals.

=== Performances on The Voice of Germany 2011 ===
Theme	Song	Original Singer	result
The Blind Auditions	"American Boy"	Estelle & Kanye West	1 chair turned Joined Team The BossHoss
The Battle	"Ain't No Mountain High Enough" vs Emma & Felix	Marvin Gaye & Tammi Terrell	Won Battle
Live show 1	"Firework"	Katy Perry	Public vote
Live show 2	"One"	U2	The BossHoss's vote
Live show 3	"Domino"	Jessie J	Eliminated

== Eurovision Song Contest ==
The singer tried to represent Romania at the Eurovision Song Contest with "Trilogy of Life" and "My Heart is Still Winning" in 2015 and 2016, respectively. On the first occasion, she was disqualified because of plagiarism accusations, and on the second occasion she did not reach the semifinals because the jury of the Selecția Națională thought the song did not have a solid chorus. In 2017, Nerra reached seventh place in the final round of the Selecția Națională 2017 with "Save Me".

== Discography ==
- "In and Out of Love" (2012) (ATB feat. Ramona Nerra & Rudee)
- "Never Give Up" (2012) (ATB feat. Ramona Nerra)
- "Trilogy of Life" (2015)
- "My Heart is Still Winning" (2016)
- "Save Me" (2017)
