= Yodel It! =

Song by Ilinca and Alex Florea

- Artwork for the initial release of "Yodel It!". The cover was later changed for the Eurovision re-release in March 2017.

Single by Ilinca and Alex Florea
- Released: 30 January 2017
- Genre: Rock; pop; hip hop
- Length: 2:56
- Label: Cat
- Songwriter: Alexandra Niculae
- Producer: Mihai Alexandru

Ilinca singles chronology
"Yodel It!" (2017)	"Amici" (2017)

Music video
- "Yodel It!" on YouTube

Audio sample
- file; help

Eurovision Song Contest 2017 entry
- Country: Romania
- Artists: Ilinca & Alex Florea
- Language: English
- Composer: Mihai Alexandru
- Lyricist: Alexandra Niculae

Finals performance
- Semi-final result: 6th
- Semi-final points: 174
- Final result: 7th
- Final points: 282

Entry chronology
- ◄ "Moment of Silence" (2016)
- "Goodbye" (2018) ►

Official performance video
- "Yodel It!" (final) on YouTube

"Yodel It!" is a song recorded by Romanian singers Ilinca and Alex Florea, released on 30 January 2017 by Cat Music. The track was written by Alexandra Niculae and produced by Mihai Alexandru for the Swiss band Timebelle who rejected it. It was then given to Ilinca to record. Florea was chosen as a featured artist as both Alexandru and Ilinca felt her version was incomplete. "Yodel It!" is a mixture of rock, pop and hip hop music, including Ilinca yodeling during the chorus and Florea's rap vocals. The track's optimistic lyrical message was compared to that of Taylor Swift's "Shake It Off" (2014).

The song represented Romania in the Eurovision Song Contest 2017 after winning the pre-selection show Selecția Națională. The country reached seventh place in a field of 26, scoring a total of 282 points. During their show, Ilinca and Florea were accompanied by a variety of colorful imagery displayed in the background. The song received mixed reviews from music critics. While it was praised for its catchiness and appeal, the yodeling sequences were criticized as being atypical of Romanian culture. Some parts of the recording were also likened to the band The Script and will.i.am's song "Hall of Fame" (2012). "Yodel It!" won in the Song of the Year category at the 2017 Radar de Media Awards in Romania.

In order to promote and support "Yodel It!", the singers made various appearances to perform the song, including at the 2017 European Artistic Gymnastics Championships, as well as in London, Madrid, Amsterdam and Tel Aviv. An accompanying music video was filmed by Dan Petcan in Cluj-Napoca and was uploaded to YouTube on 21 April 2017. It shows Ilinca and Florea singing to each other standing atop huge computer-generated towers. Commercially, "Yodel It!" reached the top 100 of various charts after Eurovision, including those in France, Germany, the United Kingdom and Spain.

== Background and composition ==
"Yodel It!" was written solely by Alexandra Niculae, while production was handled by Mihai Alexandru. In an interview, Ilinca revealed that after Alexandru had finished the song, he invited her via Facebook to his studio as she was the only person he knew in Romania who could yodel. The track was originally recorded with a solo vocal, but Florea was chosen as a featured vocal artist as Ilinca and Alexandru felt the initial version was incomplete. He received the offer to sing on the track two weeks before the song was to be submitted for the selection of the Romanian song for the Eurovision Song Contest 2017. It was later revealed that Niculae wrote "Yodel It!" initially for the Swiss band Timebelle, the Swiss representative for Eurovision 2017, and that it was planned to be the song that represented Switzerland in the contest with Ilinca as the band's vocalist. However, the track was rejected by the group in favor of "Apollo". Alexandru submitted "Yodel It!" to the Romanian national selection committee although it "ha[d] nothing Romanian in it".

"Yodel It!", which is two minutes and 56 seconds in length, was made available for digital download on the iTunes Store on 30 January 2017 by Cat Music. On the same date, the label uploaded an audio video for the track to its YouTube channel. "Yodel It!" was also included on the Eurovision Song Contest: Kyiv 2017 compilation, which was released on 21 April 2017 and featured the 43 participating entries. Alexandru eventually remixed the song and stretched it to three minutes and 41 seconds. An English language track, "Yodel It!" combines rock with pop and hip hop music. Ilinca yodels prominently during the chorus, while Florea provides rap vocals. The song runs at a moderate tempo of 87 beats per minute. Bogdan Honciuc from Wiwibloggs likened its lyrical message to that of Taylor Swift's "Shake It Off" (2014), as "Ilinca teaches us to break free from the daily doom and gloom, but she suggests yodeling our hearts out instead of shaking it off". The song's instrumental was sent to specialists in Sweden to remaster prior to the duo's appearance at the Eurovision Grand Final in Kyiv.

== Critical reception and accolades ==
Upon its release, "Yodel It!" was met with a mixed response from music critics. Reviewers from Wiwibloggs had both positive and negative opinions of the recording, praising its staging potential, the mixture of multiple genres and the singers' stage presence, but also criticized the yodeling sequences. An editor jokingly wrote, "Look, if Switzerland are sending a Romanian band this year, why shouldn't Romania send a yodeller in return?" Overall, the reviewers on the website gave the song 7.36 out of 10 points. A later review lowered the score to 5.69 out of 10 points. Matei Ruta from EuroVisionary noticed that "Yodel It!" had a "mass appealing sound and has the important quality of being an earworm". Critical commentary also likened parts of the song to the sound of the band The Script and will.i.am's "Hall of Fame" (2012). The judges of the Selecția Națională were positive and found that the song had a simple construction and applauded its catchiness. Traian Danciu of Adevărul similarly praised "Yodel It!" and its optimistic message. The track was also predicted to rank highly at Eurovision by a number of international publications, and reached number six in the betting odds before the contest. Eurovision specialist Andrei Faur had a negative opinion of the track, calling it mediocre and unfeeling. He also noted yodeling was not a typical element of Romanian culture.

At the 2017 Radar de Media Awards gala on 26 October 2017 in Bucharest, Romania, "Yodel It!" won in the Song of the Year category based on the public's vote, which ran from 28 June–22 October. The track garnered 24% in televote, surpassing Romanian singers Andra and Lora in second and third place, respectively. During her acceptance speech, Ilinca thanked voters on behalf of herself and Florea.

== Promotion ==
The singers performed the song on the television shows Neața cu Răzvan și Dani on 20 February and La Măruță on 20 March 2017. They were also the closing act for the 2017 European Artistic Gymnastics Championships on 23 April 2017, and toured to London, Madrid, Amsterdam and Tel Aviv, as well as performing at Eurovision in Concert on 8 April and Eurovision Spain Pre-Party on 15 April 2017. Another notable appearance was at the Euroclub in Ukraine, where they sang an a cappella version of the song. An accompanying music video for "Yodel It!" was uploaded to Cat Music's YouTube channel on 21 April 2017. It was shot over three days in Cluj-Napoca by Dan Petcan. The cinematography was handled by Florin Bălan, with production by Vali Aniță and Sergiu Stoiadin. The video features scenes in the Cluj-Napoca Central Park, Piața Unirii, on the roof of a NTT DATA building and in front of the National Theatre. It was sponsored by Visit Cluj, a city programme run by the municipal government.

Shot of Ilinca (left) and Florea (right) singing to each other while standing on huge computer-generated towers.

The video begins with Ilinca walking through the city wearing a "flowy, canary" yellow dress with a plunging neckline, followed by a shot of Florea standing on top of a tall, computer-generated tower, sporting "his trademark dark clothes", singing to her from above. Later in the video, the ground under her rises to his level, and they sing to each other. Then various people are shown stopping what they are doing, the ground under them also rises to the sky, and they join the duo. The video closes with everyone dancing and having a good time on their respective towers. After its release, the clip amassed 250,000 views in 48 hours which, according to Wiwibloggs, is "amazing for a Eurovision video". Honciuc, a writer on the same website, reacted favourably to the music video saying, "The visuals highlight the positive message of the song but also the beauty of Cluj Napoca, Ilinca's hometown that serves as a backdrop." ESC Covers's Ian Fowell called it "charming".

== At Eurovision ==
=== National selection ===
TVR opened the submission period for artists' and composers' entries between 20 December 2016 and 22 January 2017. 84 were received, and each artist participated in the televised audition stage. The auditions were held between 27 January and 29 January 2017, and broadcast on a number of Romanian television channels between 5 February and 11 February 2017. From these songs, 15 qualified for the semi-finals held on 26 February where a jury determined the ten songs that qualified for the final held on 5 March 2017. The winner was then determined solely by televoting.

Ilinca and Florea auditioned their song during the live audition round of the Selecția Națională, qualifying for the semi-finals on 12 February 2017. In the semi-finals, they performed ninth, preceded by Zanga with "Două sticle" and followed by Alexandra Crăescu with "Hope". The singers went on to qualify in first place for the final on 27 February 2017, receiving the maximum of 60 points from the jurors; jury members Andrei Tudor, Paula Seling, Ovidiu Cernăuțeanu, Luminița Anghel and Adrian Romcescu each awarded them 12 points. The artists performed second in the final round on 5 March 2017, preceded by Ana Maria Mirică with "Spune-mi tu" and followed by Eduard Santha with "Wild Child". Ilinca and Florea ultimately won the Selecția Națională, gathering 10,377 audience votes, nearly twice as many as follow-up Mihai Trăistariu with "I Won't Surrender".

=== In Kyiv ===
The Eurovision Song Contest 2017 took place at the International Exhibition Centre in Kyiv, Ukraine and consisted of two semi-finals on 9 and 11 May, and the final on 13 May 2017. According to Eurovision rules each country, except the host country and the "Big 5" (France, Germany, Italy, Spain and the United Kingdom), is required to qualify from one of two semi-finals to compete for the final; the top ten countries from each semi-final progress to the final. On 31 January 2017, it was announced that Romania would perform sixth in the second semi-final, preceded by Malta and followed by the Netherlands. This order was later changed after Russia's withdrawal from the contest, resulting in Romania performing in fifth place. In an interview with Adevărul in March 2017, the singers stated that the €5,000 they had received after winning the Romanian national selection was fully invested in their live performance at the Eurovision. They also revealed that they were in the process of creating a simple movement to accompany the song's yodeling sequences. Ilinca and Florea's rehearsals in Kyiv were scheduled on 2 May and 5 May 2017. Complaints about camera work were lodged, and Florea injured himself after falling off a cannon during the first rehearsal.

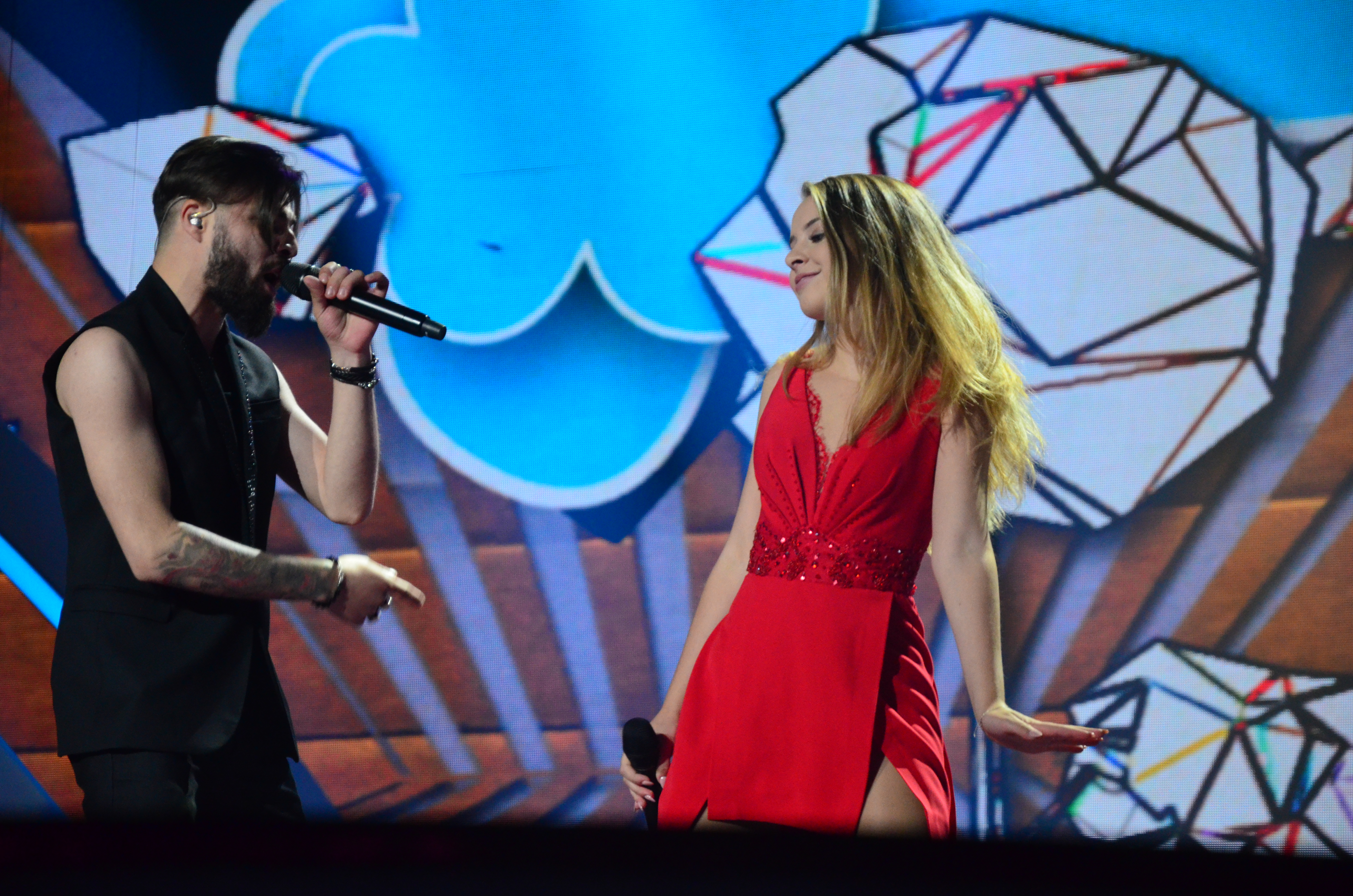
Florea (left) and Ilinca (right) shown during a rehearsal. She is wearing a red Athena Phillip dress.

The concept for the stage show—which was done in Romania along with the stage graphics in Kyiv—was revealed during their first rehearsal. Florea thought that the concept reinforced the message of love saying, "It's about making love, not war". In an interview, the head of delegation Marciuc stated that the performance would not be accompanied by pyrotechnics as it was "impactful enough". The show was directed by Aurel Badea, Sergiu Ardelean was director of photography, and Gabriel Scirlet was the musical director. A scene where Florea jumps out from a cannon was inspired by a similar one from the 1997 movie Life Is Beautiful, representing "the end of the war".

The show began with a number of large toy soldiers drumming in the background. Colourful imagery was displayed during the rest of the performance, including "colourful butterflies, blue clouds, white roses, blue musical notes and images flying all over the place" along with the letters YODEL IT in different tones. The singers performed in a yellow circle, with Ilinca wearing an Athena Phillip dress designed by Rodica Puca, and Florea clothing designed by Adina Buzatu. At the end of the performance Florea appeared on a glittery cannon originally planned to shoot colorful objects—which according to the singer would have represented an "explosion of love and happiness"—followed by a second cannon which was introduced and displayed in the background. Florea's brother provided backing vocals. The concept was praised by EuroVisionary writer Michael Outerson, who called it "by far the most colourful stage so far" and concluded, "It seems to be qualifying based on this performance." William Lee Adams from Wiwibloggs stated that the show "really worked [...] Oozing happiness at every turn, this was three minutes of feel-good fun" and predicted Romania would rank highly in the televote.

Romania qualified for the Grand Final in sixth place with 174 points on 11 May 2017, ranked 15th by the jury's 26 points, and third by the televote of 148 points. Soon after, the country was scheduled to perform 20th in the final, following Cyprus and preceding Germany. Florea's "disastrous" attempt to kiss Ilinca at the end of their performance was the subject of controversy and irony on social media due to her wry facial expression. Adam Miller from Daily Express wrote, "The 18-year-old singer appeared to be mortified when her duet partner came in for the kill, squirming and leaning back to escape Alex's clutches." Ilinca's dress was also deemed too short, with Daily Express writer Helen Daly saying it "flaunted her enviable pins" and "almost revealed more". The country reached seventh place in a field of 26 with 282 points, placed 15th by the jury's 58 points and fifth by the televote of 224 points.

==== Points awarded to Romania ====
Below is a breakdown of points awarded to Romania in the second semi-final and Grand Final of the contest, and the breakdown of the jury voting and televoting conducted during the two shows. On the latter occasion, the nation received televoting points from 38 of the total 42 countries.

Points awarded to Romania (Semi-Final 2)
Televote
12 points	10 points	8 points	7 points	6 points
Estonia; France	Israel	Netherlands; San Marino; Denmark; Ireland; Norway	Malta; Bulgaria; Croatia; Germany; Switzerland; Austria; Hungary	Serbia; Lithuania
5 points	4 points	3 points	2 points	1 point
Belarus; Ukraine	Macedonia			
Jury
12 points	10 points	8 points	7 points	6 points
	Macedonia			
5 points	4 points	3 points	2 points	1 point
	Malta; Ukraine; Ireland	Israel		Netherlands

Points awarded to Romania (Final)
Televote
12 points	10 points	8 points	7 points	6 points
Ireland; Moldova	France; Norway; Austria; Italy; Australia	Bulgaria	Portugal; Netherlands; Spain; Israel; Poland; United Kingdom	Belgium; Malta; San Marino; Croatia; Estonia; Germany; Czech Republic; Hungary
5 points	4 points	3 points	2 points	1 point
Iceland; Latvia	Cyprus; Serbia; Lithuania; Denmark; Albania; Switzerland	Sweden; Ukraine; Finland	Belarus; Armenia; Azerbaijan; Slovenia	Greece
Jury
12 points	10 points	8 points	7 points	6 points
Moldova	Montenegro	Ireland		Greece
5 points	4 points	3 points	2 points	1 point
Malta	Macedonia	Bulgaria; Azerbaijan; Albania; Latvia		Netherlands

== Charts ==
Chart performance for "Yodel It!"
Chart (2017)	Peak position
Austria (Ö3 Austria Top 40)	34
Belgium (Ultratip Bubbling Under Flanders)	38
France (SNEP)	70
Germany (GfK)	93
Netherlands (Single Top 100)	90
Scotland Singles (OCC)	49
Spain (Promusicae)	46
Sweden (Sverigetopplistan)	64
Switzerland (Schweizer Hitparade)	50
UK Singles Downloads (OCC)	44

== Release history ==
Release history and formats for "Yodel It!"
Territory	Date	Format(s)	Label
Various	30 January 2017	Digital download	Cat Music

== See also ==
- List of music released by Romanian artists that has charted in major music markets
