= Alex Florea =

Romanian singer (born 1991)

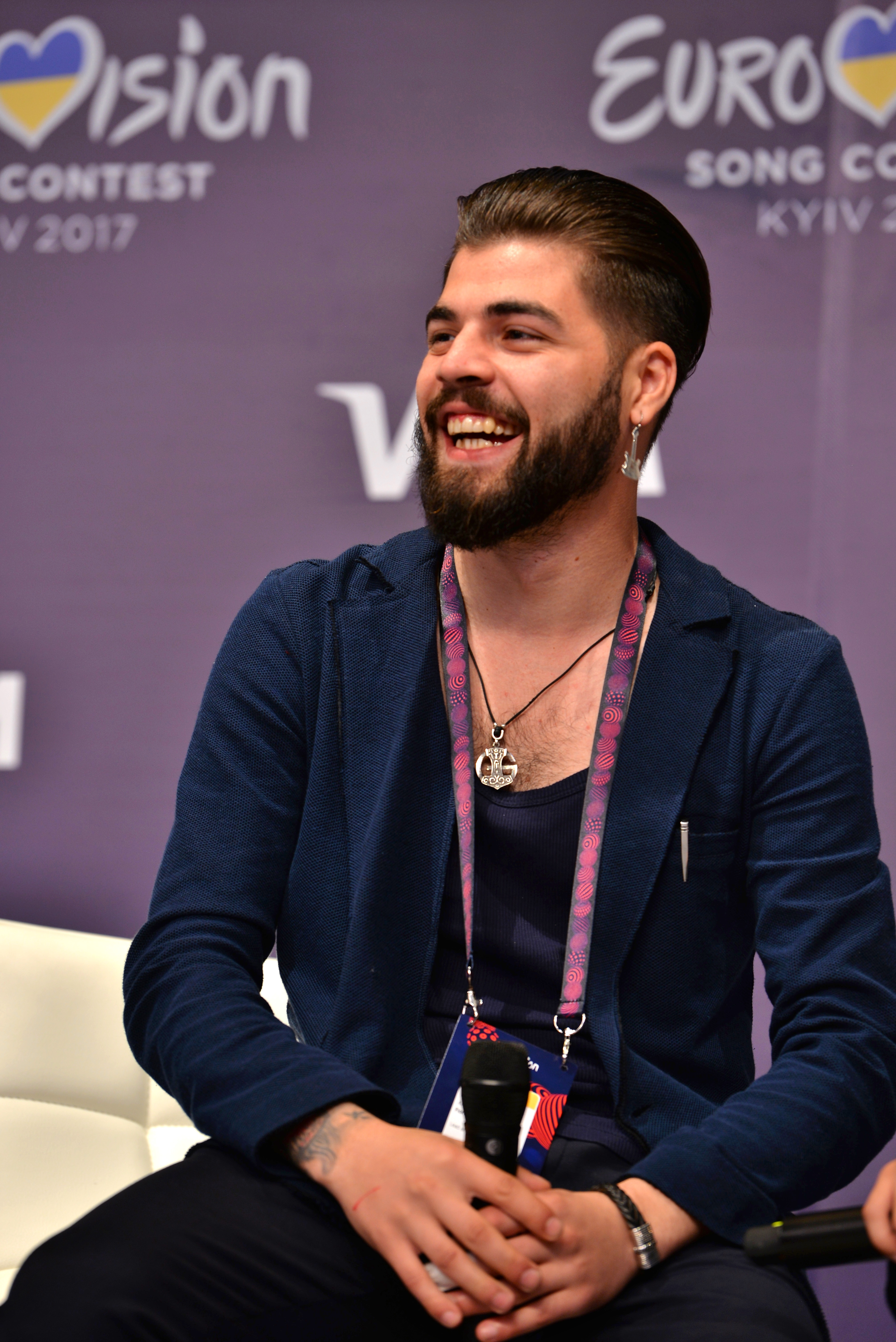
- Alex Florea (2017; age 25)

Background information
- Born: Alexandru Ionuț Florea; 15 September 1991 (age 35); Constanța, Romania
- Genre: Pop
- Occupations: Singer
- Instruments: Vocals

Alexandru Ionuț "Alex" Florea (Romanian pronunciation: [alekˈsandru joˈnuts (ˈaleks) ˈflore̯a]; born 15 September 1991) is a Romanian singer. Along with Ilinca Băcilă, he represented Romania in the Eurovision Song Contest 2017 with the song "Yodel It!", finishing in 7th place in the grand final.

Florea previously competed in season four of X Factor and in season five of Vocea României.

== Discography ==
=== Singles ===
Title	Year	Peak chart positions								Album
Title	Year	AUT	BEL (Fl) Tip	FRA	GER	NLD	SCO	SWE	SWI	Album
"Yodel It!" (with Ilinca)	2017	34	38	70	93	90	49	64	50	Non-album single
"Nobody Told Me It Would Hurt"	2017	—	—	—	—	—	—	—	—	Non-album single
"—" denotes a single that did not chart or was not released in that territory.

== Awards and nominations ==
Year	Award	Category	Recipient	Result	Ref.
2017	Radar de Media Awards	Song of the Year	"Yodel It!"	Won	

== See also ==
- Ilinca Băcilă

== See also ==
- List of music released by Romanian artists that has charted in major music markets

Preceded by Voltaj with "De la capăt"	Romania in the Eurovision Song Contest; 2017 (with Ilinca Băcilă)	Succeeded by The Humans with "Goodbye"
