= Ilinca Băcilă =

Romanian singer and yodeler (born 1998)

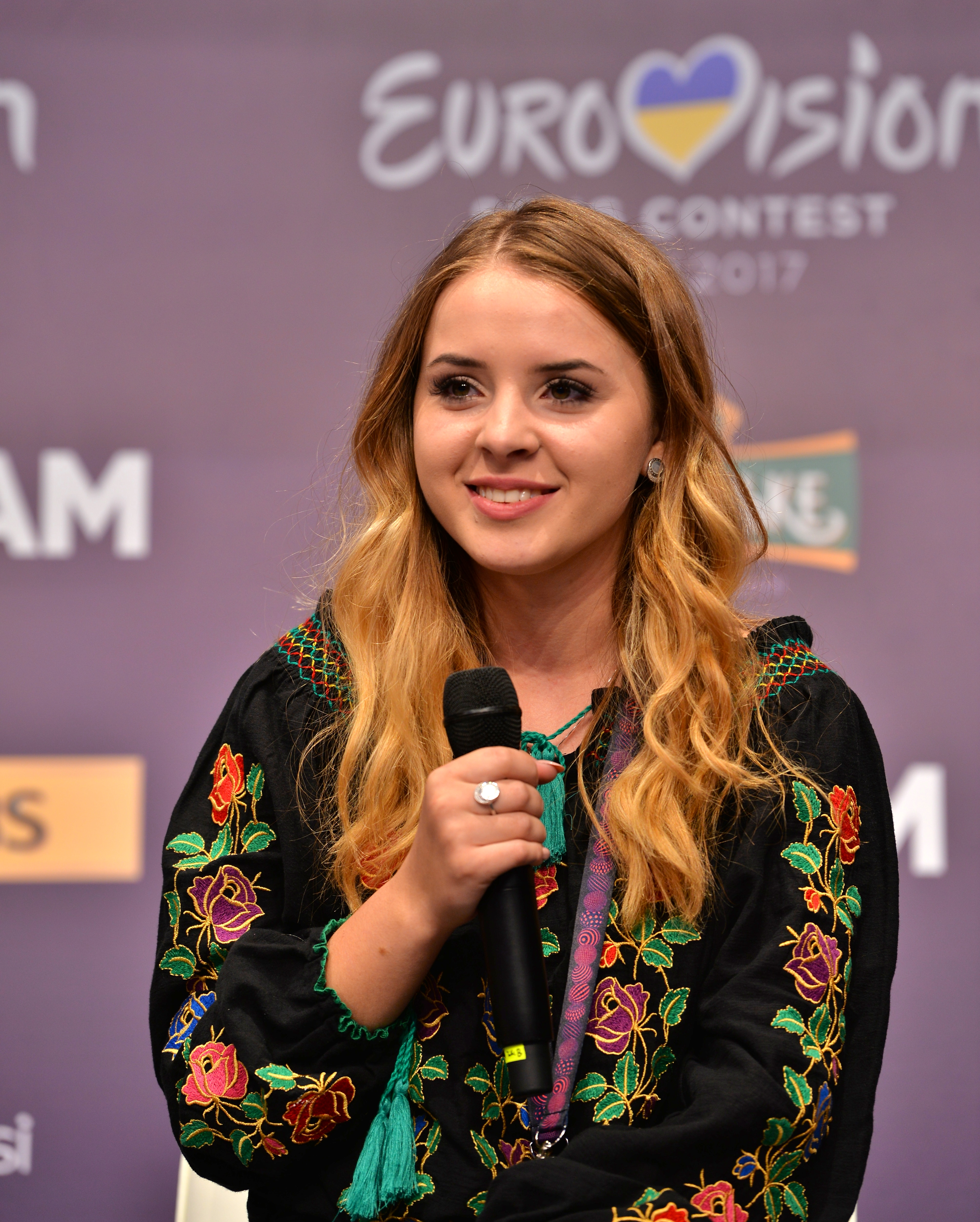
- Ilinca Băcilă (2017; age 18)

Background information
- Also known as: Ilinca
- Born: 17 August 1998 (age 28); Târgu Mureș, Romania
- Origin: Cluj Napoca, Romania
- Genre: Pop
- Occupations: Singer; yodeler
- Instruments: Vocals; piano; guitar
- Years active: 2012–present

Maria Ilinca Băcilă (Romanian pronunciation: [maˈri.a iˈliŋka bəˈt͡ʃilə]; born 17 August 1998), also known as simply Ilinca, is a Romanian singer and yodeler. She is well known for her unique yodel. She participated in the Eurovision Song Contest 2017, representing Romania, along with Alex Florea.

== Career ==
=== 2012–14: Românii au talent, X Factor and Vocea Romaniei ===
In 2012, Ilinca participated in the second season of Românii au talent.

In 2013, Ilinca participated in the third season of X Factor with Trupa Quattro.

In 2014, Ilinca participated in the 4th season of Vocea Romaniei, where she reached the semi-final.

=== 2017: Eurovision Song Contest ===
Along with Alex Florea, Ilinca represented Romania in the Eurovision Song Contest 2017, coming in 7th place with the song "Yodel It!".

On 11 May 2017, a few hours before the second semi-final of the Eurovision contest, another of her songs, "Amici", was published.

== Discography ==
=== Singles ===
Title	Year	Peak chart positions								Album
Title	Year	AUT	BEL (Fl) Tip	FRA	GER	NLD	SCO	SWE	SWI	Album
"Yodel It!" (with Alex Florea)	2017	34	38	70	93	90	49	64	50	Non-album singles
"Amici"	2017	—	—	—	—	—	—	—	—	Non-album singles
"Nu acum"	2018	—	—	—	—	—	—	—	—	Non-album singles
"—" denotes a single that did not chart or was not released in that territory.

== Awards and nominations ==
Year	Award	Category	Recipient	Result	Ref.
2017	Radar de Media Awards	Song of the Year	"Yodel It!"	Won	

== See also ==
- Alex Florea
- Romania in the Eurovision Song Contest 2017

== See also ==
- List of music released by Romanian artists that has charted in major music markets

Preceded by Voltaj with "De la capăt"	Romania in the Eurovision Song Contest; 2017 (with Alex Florea)	Succeeded by The Humans with "Goodbye"
