= Ciocârlia (Romanian folk tune) =

Romanian folk song

Ciocârlia ([t͡ʃjo.kɨrˈli.a], lit. 'the skylark') is a Romanian tune, allegedly composed by the Rromani–Romanian pan flute player Angheluş Dinicu in the virtuosic style of the urban lăutărească music from late 19th century.

Angheluş Dinicu first presented the tune in 1889 at the inauguration of the Eiffel Tower. However, the most famous version would become that of his grandson Grigoraș Dinicu, that adapted the tune for violin. George Enescu also was inspired by Ciocârlia for his composition the Romanian Rhapsody No. 1 for orchestra.

Ciocârlia has been covered numerous times, but because it is a piece of lăutărească music and not a piece of Romanian peasant music it cannot be considered representative for the Romanian peasant spirit.

In the case of the Ciocârlia, like with other famous tunes of lăutărească music, there were attempts to hide the name of the composer in order to make it seem anonymous/traditional.

It is known as Ševa (Шева) and čučuliga (Чучулига) in Serbian, Bulgarian and Macedonian. It has also become highly popular in the Jewish Klezmer repertoire. In Georgia, the tune became widely adopted into traditional folk music repertoire and is known as "Torola" (ტოროლა, the lark)

Ciocârlia
A broadcast from the Ciocârlia numbers station, opening with the entirety of the tune.

During the communist era, the Romanian intelligence service (Securitate) operated a numbers station believed to be broadcast to spies abroad. The station known as "V01" became well known for its use of Ciocârlia as its opening interval, which would be followed by a series of number-coded messages in Romanian and concluded with the repeated word Terminat ('finished'). The station ceased broadcasting soon after the 1989 Romanian revolution.

The song was featured as part of the soundtrack for the 2009 Ubisoft game Rabbids Go Home, performed by Moldovan gypsy brass band Fanfare Vagabontu.

== See also ==
- Lăutari
- Fanfare Ciocărlia
