= Mihaela Runceanu =

Romanian singer (1955–1989)

Mihaela Valentina Runceanu (4 May 1955 – 1 November 1989) was a Romanian pop singer and vocal techniques teacher. She became a successful vocal singer, her voice being highly appreciated in Romania. Many of her songs were hits, and she released two albums, Mihaela Runceanu (1987) and Pentru voi, muguri noi (1989), the latter only one day before she was murdered in her home in Bucharest.

== Childhood and education ==
Mihaela Runceanu was born in Buzău, but, soon after, her parents moved to Bacău, where she started school. After moving back to Buzău, Mihaela attended the Music and Plastic Arts High School there. Upon finishing high school in 1974, she went to Bucharest to attend the Ciprian Porumbescu Music Conservatory, from which she graduated in 1978.

== Career ==
She started singing in high-school, and her debut took place in 1976 with a song that was broadcast on the radio. In 1975 and 1976 she participated in several music competitions and festivals. One of her songs was recorded on a Romanian 1976 hits LP.

After graduation, she taught violin at the music school in Brăila and then moved back to Buzău to teach violin at the Music and Plastic Arts High School, where she had been a student. In Buzău, she sang in a band, together with Laurențiu Cazan and George Nicolescu, among others. In 1980, she took a position of vocal technique teacher at the Popular School of Arts in Bucharest, which she held until her death in 1989.

During her time in Bucharest she launched several hits, including De-ar fi să vii, Fericirea are chipul tău and Să fim copii. In early December 1987, her first album, titled Mihaela Runceanu was released by Electrecord. Her second album, Pentru voi, muguri noi was released 31 October 1989, one day before her death.

== Death ==
In Bucharest on 1 November 1989, a personal friend of hers, Daniel Ștefănescu, visited her and insisted that they watch a videotape he had obtained (at the time, video material circulation was severely restricted by the communist government). After Mihaela went to sleep, Ștefănescu entered her bedroom and strangled her with a phone cable. He then stole jewelry, electronics, and some other items that were difficult to obtain in Romania at the time, such as meat, imported cigarettes, and gasoline. He used some of the gasoline to set fire to the apartment.

The murderer was discovered by the investigators the next day and subsequently put on trial. In 1991, he was sentenced to 21 years of imprisonment. In 2006 he was released for good behaviour.

Mihaela Runceanu's tomb is located in the Dumbrava Cemetery in her home town, Buzău.

== Legacy ==
Her death did not receive large media coverage due to communist censorship, therefore when she starred in the New Year's Eve Romanian National Television show, few Romanians were aware of her death two months before. Due to the restricted coverage of the murder in the communist media, many rumors emerged and circulated about the circumstances of her death, including one about the murderer being Nicu Ceaușescu or another member of the Ceaușescu family and another about a young man found drowned in a Bucharest lake with a note confessing Mihaela Runceanu's murder.

After the Romanian Revolution of 1989, more information about the circumstances of her death was revealed, and details of the murderer's trial appeared in a local Buzău newspaper in 1990. Later, Nicolae Peneș wrote two books about Mihaela Runceanu, containing her biography as well as details of Ștefănescu's trial published in 1990.

An annual pop music festival is held in Buzău. It is named The Mihaela Runceanu music festival in honor of the late pop singer.

In 2004, Electrecord released an 18-song compilation of Mihaela Runceanu's hits.
