= Reuniunea (Vocea României) =

- Vocea României episode
- The coaches performing Michael Jackson's "Man in the Mirror"
- Presented by: Pavel Bartoș
- Original air date: December 1, 2020

Episode chronology
← Previous "Finala (2019)"	Next → —
- Vocea României (season 10)

"Reuniunea" is a special episode of the talent show Vocea României, produced as a form of reunion due to the inability to film season 10 in 2020 due to the COVID-19 pandemic that aired December 1, 2020. The special featured all of the show's coaches so far (except for Loredana Groza, who is currently under a contract with the rival television, Antena 1) and some of the contestants and winners.

== Cast ==
- Ilinca Băcilă
- Cristina Bălan
- Mădălina Coca
- Dora Gaitanovici
- Tobi Ibitoye
- Ioana Ignat
- Bogdan Ioan
- Mădălina Lefter
- Mano
- Julie Mayaya
- Ana Maria Mirică
- Dragoș Moldovan
- Ana Munteanu
- Adi Nour
- Silviu Pașca
- Ștefan Stan
- Ștefan Știucă
- Liviu Teodorescu

=== Coaches ===
- Andra
- Pavel Bartoș
- Horia Brenciu
- Tudor Chirilă
- Adrian Despot
- Marius Moga
- Irina Rimes
- Smiley

== Performances ==
Order	Performer(s)	Song(s)
1	The Coaches	"Man in the Mirror"
2	Smiley; Marius Moga; Silviu Pașca	"O Secundă"
3	Julie Mayaya; Ana Maria Mirică; Ilinca Băcilă	"All That Jazz" "Lady Marmalade"
4	Irina Rimes; Tudor Chirilă	"Nu Știi Tu Să Fii Bărbat" "Nu am chef azi"
5	Tudor Chirilă; Cristina Bălan; Dragoș Moldovan	"The Unforgiven"
6	Liviu Teodorescu; Julie Mayaya	"Obsesie"
7	Ștefan Știucă	"Drumurile noastre"
8	Ștefan Stan; Adi Nour	"Cele două cuvinte"
9	Smiley; Adrian Despot	"Domnu' Smiley" "Basu' și cu toba mare"
10	Mano; Cristina Bălan	"In My Defence"
11	Ioana Ignat	"Nu mă uita"
12	Dora Gaitanovici; Irina Rimes; Liviu Teodorescu	"Blow"
13	Andra; Tobi Ibitoye	"Până când nu te iubeam"
14	Bogdan Ioan	"Earth Song"
15	Horia Brenciu; Tudor Chirilă	"My Way"
16	Dragoș Moldovan; Silviu Pașca	"In the End"
17	Dora Gaitanovici	"Când s-o-mpărțit norocu'"
18	Andra; Mădălina Coca	Andra songs mashup
19	Mădălina Lefter	"Nina Cried Power"
20	Ana Munteanu	"The Winner Takes It All"
21	Tobi Ibitoye	"Freedom"
