= Vocea României season 8 =

Vocea României
- Season 8
- Hosted by: Pavel Bartoș
- Coaches: Andra; Tudor Chirilă; Irina Rimes; Smiley
- Winner: Bogdan Ioan
- Winning coach: "Smiley"
- Runner-up: Dora Gaitanovici
- No. of episodes: 18

Release
- Original network: ProTV
- Original release: September 7 – December 14, 2018

Season chronology
- ← Previous; Season 7 Next → Season 9

The eighth season of the Romanian reality talent show Vocea României premiered on ProTV on September 7, 2018. Pavel Bartoș returned as host, while Irina Fodor replaced Lili Sandu as the social media correspondent. Laura Giurcanu was the vlogger of the show. Tudor Chirilă and Smiley returned as coaches, while Irina Rimes and Andra replaced Loredana Groza and Adrian Despot as coaches.

The season finale aired on December 14, 2018. Bogdan Ioan, mentored by Smiley, was declared winner of the season. It was Smiley's third victory as a coach.

== Auditions ==
Cities where the pre-selections were held.

The open call auditions were held in the following locations:

Date	Audition venue	Location
February 25, 2018	Golden Tulip Ana Dome	Cluj-Napoca
March 4, 2018	Hotel Intercontinental	Iași
March 11, 2018	Hotel NH	Timișoara
March 24–25, 2018	Hotel IBIS Gara de Nord	Bucharest

== Teams ==
Color key

- Winner
- Runner-up
- Third place
- Fourth place
- Eliminated in the Live Shows
- Stolen in the Battle rounds
- Eliminated in the Battle rounds
- Eliminated in the Knockout rounds

Coaches	Top 58 artists					
Tudor Chirilă						
Tudor Chirilă	Alma Boiangiu	Romanița Fricosu	Lavinia Rusu	Mihai Meiroș	Daria Tănasă	Dana Olteanu
Tudor Chirilă	Luciana Răducanu	Cristian Alexa	~~Mara Căptaru~~	Alexandra Cuza	Teodora Stoica	Luiza Cobori
Tudor Chirilă	Origen Todoran	Maria Pop	Dombi Enescu Șandor	Joel Benson		
Irina Rimes						
Irina Rimes	Dora Gaitanovici	Alexa Dragu	Alina Statie	Eva Timuș	Antinia Simion	Mara Căptaru
Irina Rimes	Gabriela Munteanu	Feihong Basigu	Maria Andrici	Oana Tăbultoc	Ștefania Roman	Odri Bârcă
Irina Rimes	Eduard Malereu	Silvia Vîrlan	Lăcrămioara Bradoschi			
Andra						
Andra	Céline Mădălina Coca	Renate Grad	Silviu Murariu	Sara Chiavegato	Nicoleta Oancea	Izabela Barbu
Andra	Cristina Budeanu	Elena Hasna	~~Diana Strat~~	Claudia Popină	Claudia Negruț	Silvia Preda
Andra	Mihai Turbatu	Maria Udrea	Florian Popa			
Smiley						
Smiley	Bogdan Ioan	Vitalie Maciunschi	Sorina Bică	Letiția Roman	Geanina Militaru	Andrei Voicu
Smiley	Diana Strat	Dalina Nemeș	~~Silviu Murariu~~	~~Lavinia Rusu~~	Daria Mirea	Mihnea Vîlceanu
Smiley	Evelina Găvan	Andreea Popa	Claudiu Fălămaș	Lina Sandén		
Note: Italicized names are stolen contestants (names struck through within former teams).

== Blind auditions ==
Color key

✔	Coach pressed "I WANT YOU" button
	Artist defaulted to a coach's team
	Artist elected a coach's team
	Artist was eliminated
✘	Coach pressed the "I want you" button, but was blocked by Tudor from getting the artist
✘	Coach pressed the "I want you" button, but was blocked by Irina from getting the artist
✘	Coach pressed the "I want you" button, but was blocked by Andra from getting the artist
✘	Coach pressed the "I want you" button, but was blocked by Smiley from getting the artist

=== Episode 1 (September 7) ===
The first episode aired on September 7, 2018. The coaches performed "We Will Rock You" at the start of the show.

Order	Artist	Age	Hometown	Song	Coach's and artist's choices			
Order	Artist	Age	Hometown	Song	Tudor	Irina	Andra	Smiley
1	Alexa Dragu	18	Bistrița, Bistrița-Năsăud	"I Never Loved a Man (The Way I Love You)"	✔	✔	✔	✔
2	Diana Petrescu	–	–	"Walking in Memphis"	—	—	—	—
3	Claudiu Fălămaș	27	Sibiu, Sibiu	"Jérusalem"	—	—	—	✔
4	Marina Vlad	20	Craiova, Dolj	"Un actor grăbit"	—	—	—	—
5	Bogdan Ioan	28	Constanța, Constanța	"Earth Song"	✔	✔	✔	✔

=== Episode 2 (September 8) ===
The second episode aired on September 8, 2018.

Order	Artist	Age	Hometown	Song	Coach's and artist's choices			
Order	Artist	Age	Hometown	Song	Tudor	Irina	Andra	Smiley
1	Horațiu Boșca	40	Cluj-Napoca, Cluj	"L-O-V-E"	—	—	—	—
2	Maria Pop	22	Tăuții-Măgherăuș, Maramureș	"Mama Do (Uh Oh, Uh Oh)"	✔	✔	—	—
3	Sara Chiavegato	19	Italy	"Crazy in Love"	✔	✔	✔	✔
4	Gabriel Ciubotă	24	Ploiești, Prahova	"Let Her Go"	—	—	—	—
5	Antinia Simion	20	Alba Iulia, Alba	"Ex's & Oh's"	—	✔	✔	—
6	Claudia Popină	28	Bucharest	"Don't Be So Hard on Yourself"	✔	—	✔	—
7	Lina Sandén	33	Malmö, Sweden	"Wake Me Up"	✔	—	—	✔
8	Matei Blaga	20	Constanța, Constanța	"This Love"	—	—	—	—
9	Romanița Fricosu	31	Pitești, Argeș	"Nu sunt perfectă"	✔	—	—	✔
10	Lăcrămioara Bradoschi	29	Ploiești, Prahova	"Don't You Remember"	—	✔	—	—

=== Episode 3 (September 14) ===
The third episode aired on September 14, 2018.

Order	Artist	Age	Hometown	Song	Coach's and artist's choices			
Order	Artist	Age	Hometown	Song	Tudor	Irina	Andra	Smiley
1	Vitalie Maciunschi	32	Chișinău, Moldova	"Le Temps des Cathédrales (Notre Dame de Paris)"	✔	✔	✔	✔
2	Claudia Negruț	29	Timișoara, Timiș	"Upside Down"	—	✔	✔	✔
3	Marina Carpen	19	Atena, Greece	"Nu mă uita"	—	—	—	—
4	Rareș Mariș	17	Cluj-Napoca, Cluj	"Let It Go"	—	—	—	—
5	Dora Gaitanovici	18	Buzău, Buzău	"One More Try"	✘	✔	✔	✔
6	Virgil-Marius Pop	48	Șimleu Silvaniei, Sălaj	"Carrie"	—	—	—	—
7	Origen Todoran	32	Cluj-Napoca, Cluj	"Another Love"	✔	—	—	✔
8	Diana Start	22	Bacău, Bacău	"Nobody's Perfect"	—	—	✔	—
9	Laura Furău	33	–	"Raggamuffin"	—	—	—	—
10	Alina Statie	23	Balș, Olt	"Breakeven"	—	✔	—	—
11	Mădălina Ignat	21	Botoșani, Botoșani	"Raggamuffin"	—	—	—	—
12	Alma Boiangiu	26	Bucharest	"Wonderwall"	✔	✔	—	✔

=== Episode 4 (September 21) ===
The fourth episode aired on September 21, 2018.

Order	Artist	Age	Hometown	Song	Coach's and artist's choices			
Order	Artist	Age	Hometown	Song	Tudor	Irina	Andra	Smiley
1	Nicoleta Oancea	20	Bucharest	"Can't Stop the Feeling!"	—	—	✔	✔
2	Alina Voicu	18	Bacău, Bacău	"All About That Bass"	—	—	—	—
3	Alexandru Dobre	31	–	"Save Room"	—	—	—	—
4	Renate Grad	30	Vișeu de Sus, Maramureș	"I Will Always Love You"	✔	✔	✔	✔
5	Sorina Bică	20	Craiova, Dolj	"You Shook Me All Night Long"	—	✔	✔	✔
6	Andrei Timofte	26	–	"Sex Bomb"	—	—	—	—
7	Daria Tănasă	18	Bacău, Bacău	"Ain't No Other Man"	✔	✔	✔	–
8	Letiția Moisescu	35	Alba Iulia, Alba	"Non, je ne regrette rien"	—	—	—	—
9	Cristian Alexa	17	Focșani, Vrancea	"Billionaire"	✔	✔	—	—
10	Cristina Holstein	–	Berlin, Germany	"O mio babbino caro"	—	—	—	—
11	Eduard Malereu	22	Chișinău, Moldova	"Perfect"	—	✔	—	—
12	Andra Mihalache	16	Bucharest	"Whataya Want from Me"	—	—	—	—
13	Odri Bârcă	23	Chișinău, Moldova	"Issues"	✔	✔	✔	✔
14	Adrian Mădălin Manu	31	–	"Everything"	—	—	—	—
15	Lavinia Rusu	17	Chișinău, Moldova	"Wrecking Ball"	—	✔	—	✔

=== Episode 5 (September 28) ===
The fifth episode aired on September 28, 2018.

Order	Artist	Age	Hometown	Song	Coach's and artist's choices			
Order	Artist	Age	Hometown	Song	Tudor	Irina	Andra	Smiley
1	Dombi Enescu Șandor	52	Eforie Sud, Constanța	"I Got You (I Feel Good)"	✔	✔	✔	✔
2	Iris Gămulescu	19	Brașov, Brașov	"Welcome to Burlesque"	—	—	—	—
3	Luiza Cobori	35	Pucioasa, Dâmbovița	"Mad About You"	✔	✔	—	—
4	Tatiana Cioban	29	Coșnița, Moldova	"A Woman's Worth"	—	—	—	—
5	Feihong Basigu	19	Pitești, Argeș / Jilin, China	"Fly Me to the Moon"	—	✔	✔	—
6	Nadejda Anghel	21	Chișinău, Moldova	"What About Us"	—	—	—	—
7	Elena Hasna	17	Târgu Jiu, Gorj	"Dangerous Woman"	—	—	✔	—
8	Letiția Roman	16	Bucharest	"Jealous"	✔	✔	—	✔
9	Andrei Zic	24	Chișinău, Moldova	"Who You Are"	—	—	—	—
10	Andreea Popa	21	Bucharest	"Rise Up"	–	✔	✘	✔
11	Mihai Turbatu	16	Slatina, Olt	"You Are So Beautiful"	—	—	✔	—
12	Maria Ilinca	18	–	"Million Reasons"	—	—	—	—
13	Oana Tăbultoc	17	Botoșani, Botoșani	"Anywhere"	—	✔	—	–
14	Céline Mădălina Coca	31	Bucharest / Paris, France	"It's All Coming Back to Me Now"	✔	✔	✔	✔

=== Episode 6 (October 5) ===
The sixth episode aired on October 5, 2018.

Order	Artist	Age	Hometown	Song	Coach's and artist's choices			
Order	Artist	Age	Hometown	Song	Tudor	Irina	Andra	Smiley
1	Mara Căptaru	16	Bucharest	"Creep"	✔	✔	✔	✔
2	Marius Deneș	24	Bucharest	"Historia de un Amor"	—	—	—	—
3	Mihnea Vîlceanu	21	Timișoara, Timiș	"Whatever It Takes"	—	—	✔	✔
4	Diana Lera	20	Focșani, Vrancea	"Smells Like Teen Spirit"	—	—	—	—
5	Eva Timuș	16	Chișinău, Moldova	"Skyfall"	—	✔	—	—
6	Sever Solnițaru	22	Pitești, Argeș	"Sex on Fire"	—	—	—	—
7	Cristina Budeanu	27	Clinceni, Ilfov	"One Night Only"	—	✘	✔	—
6	Evelina Malancă	20	Chișinău, Moldova	"Rise like a Phoenix"	—	—	—	—
7	Silvia Preda	27	Brașov, Brașov	"(You Make Me Feel Like) A Natural Woman"	—	✔	✔	—
8	Maria Andrici	18	Iași, Iași	"Cine te crezi?"	—	✔	—	—
9	Marina Ciorăneanu	43	Bucharest	"Lost on You"	—	—	—	—
10	Silviu Murariu	21	Cluj-Napoca, Cluj	"She's Out of My Life"	✔	✔	✔	✔

=== Episode 7 (October 12) ===
The seventh episode aired on October 12, 2018.

Order	Artist	Age	Hometown	Song	Coach's and artist's choices			
Order	Artist	Age	Hometown	Song	Tudor	Irina	Andra	Smiley
1	Izabela Barbu	50	Bucharest	"Summertime"	✔	✔	✔	✔
2	Cătălin Manea	23	Bucharest	"Too Good at Goodbyes"	–	–	–	–
3	Ștefania Roman	34	Bucharest	"Sympathique"	–	✔	–	–
4	Daria Mirea	17	Craiova, Dolj	"That Man"	–	✔	✔	✔
5	Georgiana Capanu	21	Curtea de Argeș, Argeș	"Tu nu ai avut curaj"	–	–	–	–
6	Joel Benson	33	Timișoara, Timiș / Bengaluru, India	"Thinking Out Loud"	✔	✔	–	✔
7	Gabriela Munteanu	18	Galați, Galați	"Bolnavi amândoi"	–	✔	–	✔
8	Andreea Ghercă	28	Buzău, Buzău	"Clown"	–	–	–	–
9	Luciana Răducanu	36	Bucharest	"Bohemian Rhapsody"	✔	✔	✔	✔
10	Florin Cristian	24	Brăila, Brăila	"You're Beautiful"	–	–	–	–
11	Brigitta Bajka	20	Brașov, Brașov	"Locked Out of Heaven"	–	–	–	–
12	Dalina Nemeș	19	Baia Mare, Maramureș	"Photograph"	✔	✔	–	✔
13	Doina Sclifos	28	Chișinău, Moldova	"Riptide"	–	–	–	–
14	Maria Udrea	18	Bolintin Vale, Giurgiu	"Do It like a Dude"	✔	✘	✔	–

=== Episode 8 (October 19) ===
The eighth and last blind audition episode aired on October 19, 2018.

Order	Artist	Age	Hometown	Song	Coach's and artist's choices			
Order	Artist	Age	Hometown	Song	Tudor	Irina	Andra	Smiley
1	Evelina Găvan	25	Brașov, Brașov	"Use Somebody"	–	–	–	✔
2	Sandra Tudorache	16	Ploiești, Prahova	"Scared to Be Lonely"	–	–	–	Team full
3	Antonia Stancu	22	Bucharest	"Friends"	–	–	–	Team full
4	Geanina Militaru	29	Bucharest	"Oops!... I Did It Again"	✔	✔	✔	✔
5	Sonia Apostol	16	Bucharest	"Kisses Back"	–	–	–	Team full
6	Florian Popa	28	Constanța, Constanța	"Tu ești primăvara mea"	–	✔	✔	Team full
7	Ilona Artene	23	Aars, Denmark	"Hurt"	–	–	Team full	Team full
8	Alexandra Cuza	24	Suceava, Suceava	"I Put a Spell on You"	✔	✔	Team full	Team full
9	Mihail Karaghiannis	23	Bucharest	"Beggin'"	–	–	Team full	Team full
10	Agatha Gazda	16	Siret, Suceava	"Jolene"	–	–	Team full	Team full
11	Mihai Meiroș	32	Bucharest	"Skin"	✔	–	Team full	Team full
12	Cristina Mircea	19	London, United Kingdom	"Toy"	Team full	–	Team full	Team full
13	Andreea Roșianu	22	Sibiu, Sibiu	"Be the One"	Team full	–	Team full	Team full
14	Silvia Vîrlan	34	Bucharest	"Love on the Brain"	Team full	✔	Team full	Team full
15	Teodora Stoica	20	Vâlcea, Vâlcea	"Royals"	✔	✔	✔	Team full

== The Battles ==
After the Blind auditions, Team Andra and Team Irina had fourteen contestants, while Team Tudor and Team Smiley had fifteen contestants for the Battle rounds. The Battles rounds started with episode 9 on October 26, 2018. Coaches began narrowing down the playing field by training the contestants. Each battle concluding with the respective coach advancing one of the two or three contestants. Each coach could steal one losing contestant from another team.

Color key:

Artist won the Battle and advanced to the Knockouts
Artist lost the Battle but was stolen by another coach and advanced to the Live shows
Artist lost the Battle and was eliminated

=== Episode 9 (26 October) ===
The ninth episode aired on October 26, 2018.

Coach	Order	Winner	Song	Loser	'Steal' result			
Coach	Order	Winner	Song	Loser	Tudor	Irina	Andra	Smiley
Irina Rimes	1	Dora Gaitanovici	"The Way You Make Me Feel"	Lăcrămioara Bradoschi	—	∅	—	—
Tudor Chirilă	2	Cristian Alexa	"In My Blood"	Joel Benson	∅	—	—	—
Smiley	3	Geanina Militaru	"Free Your Mind"	Andreea Popa	—	—	—	∅
Smiley	3	Geanina Militaru	"Free Your Mind"	Lavinia Rusu	✔	—	—	∅
Andra	4	Renate Grad	"În lipsa ta"	Florian Popa	Team full	—	∅	—
Irina Rimes	5	Alexa Dragu	"I Wish"	Silvia Vîrlan	Team full	∅	—	—
Tudor Chirilă	6	Mihai Meiroș	"Tennessee Whiskey"	Dombi Enescu Șandor	Team full	—	—	—
Smiley	7	Vitalie Maciunschi	"(I've Had) The Time of My Life"	Evelina Găvan	Team full	—	—	∅

=== Episode 10 (2 November) ===
The tenth episode aired on November 2, 2018.

Coach	Order	Winner	Song	Loser	'Steal' result			
Coach	Order	Winner	Song	Loser	Tudor	Irina	Andra	Smiley
Andra	1	Sara Chiavegato	"Fighter"	Maria Udrea	Team full	—	∅	—
Tudor Chirilă	2	Daria Tănasă	"These Days"	Maria Pop	Team full	∅	—	—
Irina Rimes	3	Gabriela Munteanu	"Vals"	Eduard Malereu	Team full	∅	—	—
Smiley	4	Letiția Roman	"Sunday Morning"	Mihnea Vîlceanu	Team full	—	—	∅
Andra	5	Elena Hasna	"Need You Now"	Mihai Turbatu	Team full	—	∅	—
Tudor Chirilă	6	Luciana Răducanu	"Honky Tonk Women"	Origen Todoran	Team full	—	—	—
Smiley	7	Sorina Bică	"Say Something"	Silviu Murariu	Team full	✔	✔	∅

=== Episode 11 (9 November) ===
The eleventh episode aired on November 9, 2018.

Coach	Order	Winner	Song	Loser	'Steal' result			
Coach	Order	Winner	Song	Loser	Tudor	Irina	Andra	Smiley
Irina Rimes	1	Alina Statie	"Believer"	Odri Bârcă	Team full	∅	Team full	—
Tudor Chirilă	2	Dana Olteanu	"Only Love Can Hurt Like This"	Luiza Cobori	Team full	—	Team full	—
Andra	3	Cristina Budeanu	"Tears"	Silvia Preda	Team full	—	Team full	—
Smiley	4	Bogdan Ioan	"Done for Me"	Daria Mirea	Team full	—	Team full	∅
Irina Rimes	5	Feihong Basigu	"Sweet Dreams (Are Made of This)"	Ștefania Roman	Team full	∅	Team full	—
Andra	6	Nicoleta Oancea	"One Last Time"	Claudia Negruț	Team full	—	Team full	—
Tudor Chirilă	7	Alma Boiangiu	"Grenade"	Mara Căptaru	Team full	✔	Team full	✔

=== Episode 12 (16 November) ===
The twelfth episode aired on November 16, 2018.

Coach	Order	Winner	Song	Loser	'Steal' result			
Coach	Order	Winner	Song	Loser	Tudor	Irina	Andra	Smiley
Irina Rimes	1	Antinia Simion	"In the Name of Love"	Oana Tăbultoc	Team full	Team full	Team full	—
Andra	2	Izabela Barbu	"Cry Baby"	Claudia Popină	Team full	Team full	Team full	—
Smiley	3	Dalina Nemeș	"Roar"	Lina Sandén	Team full	Team full	Team full	∅
Tudor Chirilă	4	Romanița Fricosu	"Hound Dog"	Alexandra Cuza	Team full	Team full	Team full	—
Tudor Chirilă	4	Romanița Fricosu	"Hound Dog"	Teodora Stoica	Team full	Team full	Team full	—
Irina Rimes	5	Eva Timuș	"Don't Let Me Down"	Maria Andrici	Team full	Team full	Team full	—
Smiley	6	Andrei Voicu	"Set Fire to the Rain"	Claudiu Fălămaș	Team full	Team full	Team full	∅
Andra	7	Céline Mădălina Coca	"Sign of the Times"	Diana Strat	Team full	Team full	Team full	✔

== Knockout rounds ==
The remaining eight artists from each team were split up into two groups of four. At the end of each knockout round the coach then decided out of the four artists two of them who won, and therefore made up their four artists to take to the live shows.

Colour key:

Artist won the Knockouts and advanced to the Live shows
Artist lost the Knockouts and was eliminated

=== Episode 13 (23 November) ===
The thirteenth episode aired on November 23, 2018.

Coach	Order	Artist	Song	Result
Irina Rimes	1	Feihong Basigu	"Umbrella"	Eliminated
Irina Rimes	2	Alina Statie	"Hopai Diri Da"	Advanced
Irina Rimes	3	Gabriela Munteanu	"Bang Bang"	Eliminated
Irina Rimes	4	Dora Gaitanovici	"Cryin'"	Advanced
Tudor Chirilă	5	Mihai Meiroș	"Enter Sandman"	Advanced
Tudor Chirilă	6	Luciana Răducanu	"Bring Me to Life"	Eliminated
Tudor Chirilă	7	Cristian Alexa	"Shut Up and Dance"	Eliminated
Tudor Chirilă	8	Lavinia Rusu	"You've Got The Love"	Advanced
Andra	9	Cristina Budeanu	"We Found Love"	Eliminated
Andra	10	Elena Hasna	"Strongest"	Eliminated
Andra	11	Renate Grad	"I Don't Think About You"	Advanced
Andra	12	Sara Chiavegato	"Runnin' (Lose It All)"	Advanced
Smiley	13	Bogdan Ioan	"All I Want"	Advanced
Smiley	14	Dalina Nemeș	"Budapest"	Eliminated
Smiley	15	Vitalie Maciunschi	"Zombie"	Advanced
Smiley	16	Diana Strat	"Titanium"	Eliminated

=== Episode 14 (24 November) ===
The fourteenth episode aired on November 24, 2018.

Coach	Order	Artist	Song	Result
Irina Rimes	1	Alexa Dragu	"Sax"	Advanced
Irina Rimes	2	Mara Căptaru	"Praf de stele"	Eliminated
Irina Rimes	3	Eva Timuș	"Running Up That Hill"	Advanced
Irina Rimes	4	Antinia Simion	"California Dreamin'"	Eliminated
Tudor Chirilă	5	Dana Oltean	"Bad Romance"	Eliminated
Tudor Chirilă	6	Alma Boiangiu	"Walk"	Advanced
Tudor Chirilă	7	Romanița Fricosu	"Da, mamă"	Advanced
Tudor Chirilă	8	Daria Tănasă	"Virtual Insanity"	Eliminated
Andra	9	Céline Mădălina Coca	"Symphony"	Advanced
Andra	10	Silviu Murariu	"Master Blaster (Jammin')"	Advanced
Andra	11	Izabela Barbu	"La Vie en rose"	Eliminated
Andra	12	Nicoleta Oancea	"My Heart Is Refusing Me"	Eliminated
Smiley	13	Andrei Vitan	"Toxic"	Eliminated
Smiley	14	Letiția Roman	"A Song for You"	Advanced
Smiley	15	Geanina Militaru	"Inimă, nu fi de piatră"	Eliminated
Smiley	16	Sorina Bică	"Reckoning Song (One Day)"	Advanced

== Live shows ==
Color key:

Artist was saved by the Public's votes
Artist was eliminated

=== Week 1 - Top 16 (30 November & 1 December) ===
The first week comprised episodes 15 and 16. Two contestants from each team competed in each of the first two live shows, which aired on Friday, November 30 and Saturday, December 1, 2018, respectively. In either of the two shows, the public vote could save one contestant from each team, the other one was eliminated.

Episode 15 (November 30)
Coach	Order	Artist	Song	Public vote %	Result
Smiley	1	Letiția Roman	"One Night Only"	30%	Eliminated
Smiley	2	Vitalie Maciunschi	"The Sound of Silence"	70%	Public's vote
Irina Rimes	3	Eva Timuș	"Side to Side"	19%	Eliminated
Irina Rimes	4	Alexa Dragu	"Crazy"	81%	Public's vote
Tudor Chirilă	5	Alma Boiangiu	"Chandelier"	57%	Public's vote
Tudor Chirilă	6	Mihai Meiroș	"Roxanne"	43%	Eliminated
Andra	7	Sara Chiavegato	"Don't Speak"	38%	Eliminated
Andra	8	Renate Grad	"I Wanna Dance with Somebody (Who Loves Me)"	62%	Public's vote

Episode 16 (December 1)
Coach	Order	Artist	Song	Public vote %	Result
Irina Rimes	1	Alina Statie	"Hora din Moldova"	25%	Eliminated
Irina Rimes	2	Dora Gaitanovici	"Când s-o-mpărțit norocul"	75%	Public's vote
Tudor Chirilă	3	Lavinia Rusu	"Șaraiman"	34%	Eliminated
Tudor Chirilă	4	Romanița Fricosu	"Suflet gol"	66%	Public's vote
Andra	5	Silviu Murariu	"Obsesie" / "Și îngerii au demonii lor"	43%	Eliminated
Andra	6	Céline Mădălina Coca	"Mulțumesc, iubită mamă"	57%	Public's vote
Smiley	7	Sorina Bică	"Hai vino iar în gara noastră mică"	34%	Eliminated
Smiley	8	Bogdan Ioan	"Să nu-mi iei niciodată dragostea"	66%	Public's vote

Non-competition performances
Order	Performer	Song
1	Episode 16 contestants	"Deșteaptă-te, române!"

=== Week 2 - Semi-final (7 December) ===
All eight remaining contestants performed two songs each in the semi-final on Friday, December 7, 2018: a solo song and a trio with the coach and the other teammate. The public vote could save one contestant from each team, the second one was eliminated.

Episode 15 (December 8)
Coach	Order	Artist	Solo Song	Order	Trio Song	Result
Andra	1	Renate Grad	"Livin' on a Prayer"	9	"Shallow"	Eliminated
Andra	7	Céline Mădălina Coca	"Unchain My Heart"	9	"Shallow"	Public's vote
Irina Rimes	2	Dora Gaitanovici	"Je suis malade"	6	"Visele"	Public's vote
Irina Rimes	11	Alexa Dragu	"Fallin'"	6	"Visele"	Eliminated
Tudor Chirilă	4	Romanița Fricosu	"Total Eclipse of the Heart"	12	"Perfect fără tine"	Eliminated
Tudor Chirilă	8	Alma Boiangiu	"Wicked Game"	12	"Perfect fără tine"	Public's vote
Smiley	5	Vitalie Maciunschi	"Who Wants to Live Forever"	3	"No Woman, No Cry"	Eliminated
Smiley	10	Bogdan Ioan	"Can't Feel My Face"	3	"No Woman, No Cry"	Public's vote

=== Week 3 - Final (14 December) ===
The top 4 contestants performed in the grand final on Friday, December 14, 2018. This week, the four finalists performed a solo song, a duet with a special guest and a duet with their coach. The public vote determined the winner, and that resulted in a victory for Bogdan Ioan, Smiley's third victory as a coach.

Episode 18 (December 14)
Coach	Artist	Order	Duet Song (with special guest)	Order	Duet Song (with coach)	Order	Solo Song	Result
Irina Rimes	Dora Gaitanovici	1	"Miorița" — with Roman Yagupov	5	"Nu știi tu să fii bărbat"	10	"Somebody to Love"	Runner-up
Tudor Chirilă	Alma Boiangiu	6	"Highway to Hell" — with Ovidiu Anton	11	"Nu am chef azi" / "În pădurea cu alune"	2	"Memory"	Third place
Andra	Céline Mădălina Coca	9	"Săracă inima me" — with Nicolae Furdui Iancu	3	"Atâta timp cât mă iubești"	7	"All by Myself"	Fourth place
Smiley	Bogdan Ioan	12	"I Want to Spend My Lifetime Loving You" — with Feli	8	"În lipsa mea"	4	"Billie Jean"	Winner

Non-competition performances
Order	Performer	Song
1	Ana Munteanu	"Unde te duci?"

== Elimination chart ==
Color key
Artist info

- Artist from Team Tudor
- Artist from Team Irina
- Artist from Team Andra
- Artist from Team Smiley

Result details

- Winner
- Runner-up
- Third place
- Fourth place
- Artist was saved by the public vote
- Artist was eliminated

=== Overall ===
#	Week 1	Week 2	Final
Bogdan Ioan	Safe	Safe	Winner
Dora Gaitanovici	Safe	Safe	Runner-up
Alma Boiangiu	Safe	Safe	3rd place
Céline Mădălina Coca	Safe	Safe	4th place
Vitalie Maciunschi	Safe	Eliminated	Eliminated (Week 2)
Alexa Dragu	Safe	Eliminated	Eliminated (Week 2)
Romanița Fricosu	Safe	Eliminated	Eliminated (Week 2)
Renate Grad	Safe	Eliminated	Eliminated (Week 2)
Sorina Bică	Eliminated	Eliminated (Week 1)	
Silviu Murariu	Eliminated	Eliminated (Week 1)	
Lavinia Rusu	Eliminated	Eliminated (Week 1)	
Alina Statie	Eliminated	Eliminated (Week 1)	
Sara Chiavegato	Eliminated	Eliminated (Week 1)	
Mihai Meiroș	Eliminated	Eliminated (Week 1)	
Eva Timuș	Eliminated	Eliminated (Week 1)	
Letiția Roman	Eliminated	Eliminated (Week 1)	
Reference(s)			

== Ratings ==
Episode		Original airdate	Timeslot (EET)	National				18–49			Source
Episode		Original airdate	Timeslot (EET)	Rank	Viewers (in thousands)	Rating (%)	Share (%)	Rank	Rating (%)	Share (%)	Source
1	"The Blind Auditions Premiere"	September 7, 2018	Friday, 20:30	1	1 403	7.8	19.0	1	8.8	29.5	
2	"The Blind Auditions, Part 2"	September 8, 2018	Saturday, 20:00	1	1 250	7.0	17.3	1	8.1	27.9	
3	"The Blind Auditions, Part 3"	September 14, 2018	Friday, 20:30	1	1 518	8.5	20.8	1	9.5	28.9	
4	"The Blind Auditions, Part 4"	September 21, 2018	Friday, 20:30	1	1 299	7.2	17.4	1	7.8	24.0	
5	"The Blind Auditions, Part 5"	September 28, 2018	Friday, 20:30	1	1 728	9.6	23.0	1	11.2	33.5	
6	"The Blind Auditions, Part 6"	October 5, 2018	Friday, 20:30	1	1 813	10.1	23.3	1	11.6	33.9	
7	"The Blind Auditions, Part 7"	October 12, 2018	Friday, 20:30	1	1 674	9.3	21.5	1	9.6	28.7	
8	"The Blind Auditions, Part 8"	October 21, 2018	Friday, 20:30	1	1 908	10.7	24.6	1	10.8	31.4	
9	"The Battles Premiere"	October 26, 2018	Friday, 20:30	1	1 445	8.1	18.3	1	8.0	24.3	
10	"The Battles, Part 2"	November 2, 2018	Friday, 20:30	1	1 358	7.6	17.9	1	8.3	25.8	
11	"The Battles, Part 3"	November 9, 2018	Friday, 20:30	1	1 366	7.6	17.3	1	8.3	24.2	
12	"The Battles, Part 4"	November 16, 2018	Friday, 20:30	2	1 413	7.9	17.7	1	7.4	22.6	
13	"The Knockouts Premiere"	November 23, 2018	Friday, 20:30	1	1 540	8.6	19.3	1	8.6	24.6	
14	"The Knockouts, Part 2"	November 24, 2018	Saturday, 20:00	2	1 225	6.8	14.5	2	5.9	16.8	
15	"Live show 1"	November 30, 2018	Friday, 20:30	2	1 359	7.6	16.3	1	6.9	19.1	
16	"Live show 2"	December 1, 2018	Saturday, 20:30	2	1 386	7.7	15.9	1	8.4	21.4	
17	"Live show 3"	December 7, 2018	Friday, 20:30	1	1 372	7.7	18.0	1	6.9	21.5	
18	"Final"	December 14, 2018	Friday, 20:30	1	1 560	8.7	19.2	1	4.9	22.4	
