= Vocea României season 7 =

Vocea României
- Season 7
- Hosted by: Pavel Bartoș
- Judges: Adrian Despot; Smiley; Loredana Groza; Tudor Chirilă
- Winner: Ana Munteanu
- Runner-up: Meriam Jane Ndubuisi

Release
- Original network: Pro TV
- Original release: September 8 – December 15, 2017

Season chronology
- ← Previous; Season 6 Next → Season 8

The seventh season of the Romanian reality talent show Vocea României premiered on ProTV on September 8, 2017. Pavel Bartoș returned as host. Loredana Groza, Smiley and Tudor Chirilă returned as coaches, while Adrian Despot replaced Marius Moga as the fourth coach.

The season finale aired on December 15, 2017. Ana Munteanu, mentored by Smiley, was declared winner of the season. It was Smiley's second victory as a coach.

== Auditions ==
Cities where the pre-selections were held.

The open call auditions were held in the following locations:

Date	Audition venue	Location
February 18–19, 2017	Hotel IBIS Gara de Nord	Bucharest
May 29, 2017	Hotel Intercontinental	Iași
May 28, 2017	Golden Tulip Ana Dome	Cluj-Napoca
June 4, 2017	Hotel NH	Timișoara

== Teams ==
Color key

- Winner
- Runner-up
- Third place
- Fourth place
- Eliminated in the Live Shows
- Stolen in the Battle rounds
- Eliminated in the Battle rounds

Coaches	Top 56 artists					
Tudor Chirilă						
Tudor Chirilă	Meriam Jane Ndubuisi	Ștefan Știucă	Laurențiu Mihaiu	Maria Rădeanu	Daria Grigoraș	Lidia Isac
Tudor Chirilă	Amedeo Chiriac	Răzvan Encuna	Teodora Rotaru	Axenia Șova	Oana Cenușe	Cristian Prăjescu
Tudor Chirilă	Bianca Oneț	Stelian Ailincăi	~~Raluca Ursu~~	Ioana Cristodorescu		
Loredana Groza						
Loredana Groza	Zsuzsana Cerveni	Diana Brescan	Adriana Ciobanu	Amalia Uruc	Rufus Martin	Bogdan Stănică
Loredana Groza	Tudor Bilețchi	Mihail Tirică	Lavinia Lăcătuș	Rareș Popa	Camelia Farcaș	Andrei Barz
Loredana Groza	Neonela Duplei	~~Robert Pița~~	~~Doina Spătaru~~	~~Jeannette Curta~~		
Smiley						
Smiley	Ana Munteanu	Amir Arafat	Paul Bătinaș	Octavian Casian	Răzvan Mărcuci	Ioana Vișinescu
Smiley	Ioana Barbă	Olga Roman	Laura Voinu	Dima Trofim	Marius Stoica	Iuliana Popa
Smiley	~~Tudor Bilețchi~~	~~Cristian Prăjescu~~	Jeannette Curta	~~Anne-Marie Ionescu~~		
Adrian Despot						
Adrian Despot	Andrada Crețu	Manó Ráduly Botond	Andreea Dragu	Robert Pița	Alexandru Arnăutu	Catarina Sandu
Adrian Despot	Oana Mirică	Valentin Poienariu	Ramona Dinu	~~Lauranțiu Mihaiu~~	Cosmin Vieriu	Horațiu Haiduc
Adrian Despot	Cristian Goaie	Raluca Ursu	Anne-Marie Ionescu	~~Doina Spătaru~~	~~Răzvan Mărcuci~~	
Note: Italicized names are stolen contestants (names struck through within former teams).

== Blind auditions ==
Color key

✔	Coach hit his/her "I WANT YOU" button
	Artist defaulted to this coach's team
	Artist elected to join this coach's team
	Artist eliminated with no coach pressing his or her "I WANT YOU" button

=== Episode 1 (September 8) ===
The first episode aired on September 8, 2017.

Order	Artist	Age	Hometown	Song	Coach's and contestant's choices			
Order	Artist	Age	Hometown	Song	Tudor	Smiley	Loredana	Despot
1	Ioana Vișinescu	21	Bucharest	"Get Up, Stand Up"	✔	✔	✔	✔
2	Fabián Sánchez	37	Bucharest	"Despacito"	—	—	—	—
3	Axenia Șova	26	Cluj-Napoca, Cluj	"All That Jazz"	✔	—	✔	✔
4	Zsuzsana Cerveni	18	Bucharest	"Mistreated"	—	—	✔	—
5	Catarina Sandu	21	Chișinău, Moldova	"Sax"	—	✔	✔	✔
6	Paul Ionescu Ballo	28	Bucharest	"Enjoy the Silence"	—	—	—	—
7	Neonela Duplei	29	Bucharest	"Hora din Moldova"	—	—	✔	✔
8	Ștefan Știucă	31	Bucharest	"Nothing Compares 2 U"	✔	✔	✔	✔
9	Tudora Vișan	20	Cluj-Napoca, Cluj	"Paris (Ooh La La)"	—	—	—	—
10	Răzvan Encuna	23	Ploiești, Prahova	"You Give Me Something"	✔	✔	✔	✔
11	Ana Munteanu	16	Chișinău, Moldova	"Bensonhurst Blues"	✔	✔	—	✔
12	Ion Calamanov	30	Chișinău, Moldova	"I Got You (I Feel Good)"	—	—	—	—
13	Manó Ráduly Botond	27	Sfântu Gheorghe, Covasna	"In My Defence"	✔	✔	✔	✔

=== Episode 2 (September 10) ===
The second episode aired on September 10, 2017.

Order	Artist	Age	Hometown	Song	Coach's and contestant's choices			
Order	Artist	Age	Hometown	Song	Tudor	Smiley	Loredana	Despot
1	Alexandru Arnăutu	28	Iași, Iași	"Electric Eye"	✔	✔	—	✔
2	Marloes van Hoek	24	Copand, Alba	"Say Something"	—	—	—	—
3	Jeannette Curta	40	Saarbrücken, Germany	"Feeling Good"	✔	✔	✔	—
4	Laurențiu Mihaiu	25	Orăștie, Hunedoara	"Chasing Cars"	✔	—	—	✔
5	Paula Vițian	22	Șieu-Odorhei, Bistrița-Năsăud	"Dangerous Woman"	—	—	—	—
6	Tudor Bilețchi	18	Chișinău, Moldova	"End of the Road"	✔	✔	✔	✔
7	Cristina Coșciug	22	Chișinău, Moldova	"Rolling in the Deep"	—	—	—	—
8	Adriana Ciobanu	17	Piatra Neamț, Neamț	"Bound to You"	—	—	✔	—
9	Andrei Ștefăneț	36	Chișinău, Moldova	"Așa frumoasă"	—	—	—	—
10	Daria Grigoraș	16	Iași, Iași	"Empire"	✔	—	—	—
11	Laura Oana	18	Baia Mare, Maramureș	"Je veux"	—	—	—	—
12	Octavian Casian	42	Chișinău, Moldova	"A Change Is Gonna Come"	✔	✔	—	—
13	Meriam Jane Ndubuisi	26	Reggio di Calabria, Italy	"(You Make Me Feel Like) A Natural Woman"	✔	✔	✔	✔

=== Episode 3 (September 15) ===
The third episode aired on September 15, 2017.

Order	Artist	Age	Hometown	Song	Coach's and contestant's choices			
Order	Artist	Age	Hometown	Song	Tudor	Smiley	Loredana	Despot
1	Amedeo Chiriac	19	Călărași, Călărași	"Sandcastels"	✔	✔	✔	—
2	Mihail Tirică	23	Baia Mare, Maramureș	Use Somebody	✔	—	✔	—
3	Yvonne Stavarache	21	Bucharest	"I Wanna Dance with Somebody (Who Loves Me)"	—	—	—	—
4	Marius Stoica	30	Bucharest	"Soulstorm"	—	✔	✔	—
5	Alexandra Bădoi	28	Bucharest	"In and Out of Love"	—	—	—	—
6	Andrada Crețu	17	Drobeta-Turnu Severin, Mehedinți	"What a Man"	✔	—	✔	✔
7	Paul Panait	38	Bucharest	"Kiss"	—	—	—	—
8	Olga Roman	24	Chișinău, Moldova	"When the Music Dies"	✔	✔	✔	✔
9	Adrian Barbu	26	Buzău, Buzău	"Let Me Entertain You"	—	—	—	—
10	Amalia Uruc	24	Mizil, Prahova	"Seven Nation Army"	—	—	✔	—
11	Răzvan Mărcuci	26	Timișoara, Timiș	"Chandelier"	✔	—	—	✔
12	Tatiana Turtureanu	26	Chișinău, Moldova	"Lost on You"	—	—	—	—
13	Lidia Isac	24	Chișinău, Moldova	"When We Were Young"	✔	✔	✔	✔

=== Episode 4 (September 22) ===
The fourth episode aired on September 22, 2017.

Order	Artist	Age	Hometown	Song	Coach's and contestant's choices			
Order	Artist	Age	Hometown	Song	Tudor	Smiley	Loredana	Despot
1	Amir Arafat	31	Iași, Iași	"Make It Rain"	✔	✔	✔	✔
2	Oana Mirică	29	Galați, Galați	"I Won't Go for More"	✔	—	—	✔
3	Vlad Alexandrescu	40	Râmnicu Vâlcea, Vălcea	"Rebel Yell"	—	—	—	—
4	Diana Francesca Filipescu	23	Năvodari, Constanța	"Scared to Be Lonely"	—	—	—	—
5	Horațiu Haiduc	26	Aghireșu, Cluj	"I Need a Dollar"	—	—	✔	✔
6	Daniela Dumitru	22	Bucharest	"Say You Won't Let Go"	—	—	—	—
7	Andrei Barz	16	Călărași, Călărași	"Sweater Weather"	—	—	✔	—
8	Bianca Oneț	23	Cluj-Napoca, Cluj	"Am I the One"	✔	✔	✔	✔
9	Iasmina Curcă	32	Petroșani, Hunedoara	"Born This Way"	—	—	—	—
10	Rufus Martin	41	München, Germany	"Another Day in Paradise"	—	✔	✔	—
11	Anne-Marie Ionescu	23	Bucharest	"Love on the Brain"	—	✔	✔	—
12	Alexandra Todosi	21	Suceava, Suceava	"Joe le taxi"	—	—	—	—
13	Maria Rădeanu	17	Iași, Iași	"Someone like You"	✔	✔	✔	—

=== Episode 5 (September 29) ===
The fifth episode aired on September 29, 2017.

Order	Artist	Age	Hometown	Song	Coach's and contestant's choices			
Order	Artist	Age	Hometown	Song	Tudor	Smiley	Loredana	Despot
1	Ioana Cristodorescu	18	Galați, Galați	"God Bless the Child"	✔	—	✔	—
2	Robert Pița	19	Brașov, Brașov	"Mama, I'm Coming Home"	—	—	✔	—
3	Deborah Opruța	16	Alba Iulia, Alba	"You Don't Own Me"	—	—	—	—
4	Maria Magdalena Popescu	??	Bucharest	"It's a Heartache"	—	—	—	—
5	Laura Voinu	18	Cantemir, Moldova	"I Care"	—	✔	✔	✔
6	Dan Bubuioc	38	Bucharest	"Skin"	—	—	—	—
7	Dima Trofim	28	Bucharest	"Fairytale"	—	✔	✔	—
8	Andreea Dragu	18	Constanța, Constanța	"Sexy Silk"	—	—	✔	✔
9	Andrei Bordianu	30	Iași, Iași	"Kalašnjikov" / "Gas Gas"	—	—	—	—
10	Bogdan Stănică	19	Videle, Teleorman	"I'm Not the Only One"	—	—	✔	✔
11	Alexandra Giurgia	28	Bacău, Bacău	"Burn"	—	—	—	—
12	Ionuț Vâlcu	34	Focșani, Vrancea	"I Can't Make You Love Me"	—	—	—	—
13	Paul Bătinaș	20	Brașov, Brașov	"Tennessee Wiskey"	✔	✔	✔	✔

=== Episode 6 (October 6) ===
The sixth episode aired on October 6, 2017.

Order	Artist	Age	Hometown	Song	Coach's and contestant's choices			
Order	Artist	Age	Hometown	Song	Tudor	Smiley	Loredana	Despot
1	Teodora Rotaru	18	Craiova, Dolj	"Believer"	✔	—	✔	✔
2	Alexia Ilie	16	Craiova, Dolj	"Raggamuffin"	—	—	—	—
3	Alexandru Trăsnea	28	Bucharest	"Sex on Fire"	—	—	—	—
4	Doina Șerbul	19	Criuleni, Moldova	"Castle in the Snow"	—	—	—	—
5	Ramona Dimu	38	Bucharest	"Wade in the Water"	✔	—	—	✔
6	Ioana Barbă	17	Iași, Iași	"Holy Grail"	—	✔	✔	—
7	Liviu Dinu	16	Bucharest	"Stairway to Heaven"	—	—	—	—
8	Emilia Gheorghe	21	Brăila, Brăila	"Constantine, Constantine"	—	—	—	—
9	Rareș Popa	22	Bucharest	"Beneath Your Beautiful"	—	—	✔	✔
10	Diana Brescan	21	Chișinău, Moldova	"Video Games"	—	—	✔	—
11	Cristian Goaie	19	Constanța, Constanța	"Dancing on My Own"	✔	—	✔	✔
12	Laura Marinkovic	18	Vienna, Austria	"Let It Go"	—	—	—	—
13	Cosmin Vieriu	26	Bucharest	"Otherside"	—	—	—	✔
14	Oana Cenușe	16	Drobeta-Turnu Severin, Mehedinți	"Stone Cold"	✔	✔	✔	✔

=== Episode 7 (October 13) ===
The seventh and the last blind auditions episode aired on October 13, 2017.

Order	Artist	Age	Hometown	Song	Coach's and contestant's choices			
Order	Artist	Age	Hometown	Song	Tudor	Smiley	Loredana	Despot
1	Cristian Prăjescu	20	Roman, Neamț	"She's Out of My Life"	✔	✔	✔	✔
2	Camelia Farcaș	17	Galbeni, Bacău	"Sign of the Times"	✔	—	✔	—
3	Tudor Magda	21	Sibiu, Sibiu	"Hound Dog"	—	—	—	—
4	Geta Gheorghe	42	Brăila, Brăila	"Vreau să am steaua mea"	—	—	—	—
5	Raluca Ursu	16	Botoșani, Botoșani	"Issues"	✔	✔	—	✔
6	Valentin Poienariu	17	Mioveni, Argeș	"You Are So Beautiful"	✔	—	✔	✔
7	Diana Păcurar	24	Brașov, Brașov	"Gangsta"	—	—	—	—
8	Iuliana Popa	22	Bucharest	"Summertime"	✔	✔	—	—
9	Tudor Stoica	28	Arad, Arad	"Numb"/"Encore"	—	—	—	—
10	Lavinia Lăcătuș	23	Bucharest	"Mercy"	—	—	✔	—
11	Ramona Stănculeț	23	Bucharest	"Symphony"	—	—	—	—
12	Stelian Ailincăi	25	Târgu Mureș, Mureș	"The Man Who Can't Be Moved"	✔	—	—	✔
13	Deia Demeny	28	Brașov, Brașov	"Mama Do (Uh Oh, Uh Oh)"	—	—	—	—
14	Doina Spătaru	31	Chișinău, Moldova	"Stop!"	—	—	—	✔

== The Battles ==
After the Blind auditions, each coach had fourteen contestants for the Battle rounds. The Battles rounds started with episode 8 on October 20, 2017. Coaches began narrowing down the playing field by training the contestants. Each battle concluding with the respective coach eliminating one of the two contestants. Each coach could steal one losing contestant from another team, but the stolen artist can be replaced by another artist until the end of this round.

Color key:

Artist won the Battle and advanced to the Knockouts
Artist lost the Battle but was stolen by another coach and advanced to the Live shows
Artist lost the Battle and was stolen by another coach but was replaced by another artist
Artist lost the Battle and was eliminated

=== Episode 8 (20 October) ===
The eighth episode aired on October 20, 2017.

Coach	Order	Winner	Song	Loser	'Steal' result			
Coach	Order	Winner	Song	Loser	Tudor	Smiley	Loredana	Despot
Tudor Chirilă	1	Meriam Jane Ndubuisi	"A Hard Day's Night"	Ioana Cristodorescu	∅	—	—	—
Loredana Groza	2	Bogdan Stănică	"On My Own"	Jeannette Curta	✔	✔	∅	—
Smiley	3	Paul Bătinaș	"Mercy"	Anne-Marie Ionescu	—	∅	—	✔
Adrian Despot	4	Catarina Sandu	"Uprising"	Răzvan Mărcuci	—	✔	✔	∅
Smiley	5	Amir Arafat	"Breakeven"	Cristian Prăjescu	✔	∅	—	—
Adrian Despot	6	Andreea Dragu	"Deeper"	Doina Spătaru	—	—	✔	∅
Tudor Chirilă	7	Daria Grigoraș	"Welcome to the Jungle"	Raluca Ursu	∅	—	—	✔

=== Episode 9 (27 October) ===
The ninth episode aired on October 27, 2017.

Coach	Order	Winner	Song	Loser	'Steal' result			
Coach	Order	Winner	Song	Loser	Tudor	Smiley	Loredana	Despot
Loredana Groza	1	Rufus Martin	"When Love Comes to Town"	Robert Pița	✔	—	∅	✔
Adrian Despot	2	Andrada Crețu	"Locked Out of Heaven"	Cristian Goaie	—	—	—	∅
Smiley	3	Ana Munteanu	"Runnin' (Lose It All)"	Tudor Bilețchi	✔	∅	✔	—
Tudor Chirilă	4	Răzvan Encuna	"Who's Gonna Ride Your Wild Horses"	Stelian Ailincăi	∅	—	—	—
Loredana Groza	5	Amalia Uruc	"Rumour Has It" / "Someone like You"	Neonela Duplei	—	—	∅	—
Adrian Despot	6	Valentin Poienariu	"Hold Back the River"	Horațiu Haiduc	—	—	—	∅
Smiley	7	Octavian Casian	"Have You Ever Seen the Rain?"	Iuliana Popa	—	∅	—	—

=== Episode 10 (3 November) ===
The tenth episode aired on November 3, 2017.

Coach	Order	Winner	Song	Loser	'Steal' result			
Coach	Order	Winner	Song	Loser	Tudor	Smiley	Loredana	Despot
Tudor Chirilă	1	Maria Rădeanu	"Do I Wanna Know?"	Bianca Oneț	∅	—	—	—
Loredana Groza	2	Adriana Ciobanu	"Visez din nou"	Andrei Barz	—	—	∅	—
Smiley	3	Ioana Vișinescu	"Perfect Strangers"	Marius Stoica	—	∅	—	—
Adrian Despot	4	Oana Mirică	"You're Nobody 'til Somebody Loves You"	Cosmin Vieriu	—	—	—	∅
Loredana Groza	5	Diana Brescan	"Read All About It"/"Uncover"	Camelia Farcaș	—	—	∅	—
Adrian Despot	6	Alexandru Arnăutu	"Second Chance"	Laurențiu Mihaiu	✔	—	—	∅
Tudor Chirilă	7	Ștefan Știucă	"Redemption Song"	Oana Cenușe	∅	—	—	—

=== Episode 11 (10 November) ===
The eleventh episode aired on November 10, 2017.

Coach	Order	Winner	Song	Loser	'Steal' result			
Coach	Order	Winner	Song	Loser	Tudor	Smiley	Loredana	Despot
Smiley	1	Ioana Barbă	"Somebody That I Used to Know"	Dima Trofim	—	∅	—	—
Tudor Chirilă	2	Lidia Isac	"The Story"	Axenia Șova	∅	—	—	—
Loredana Groza	3	Mihail Tirică	"Every You Every Me"	Rareș Popa	—	—	∅	—
Adrian Despot	4	Manó Ráduly Botond	"Woman in Chains"	Ramona Dimu	—	—	—	∅
Loredana Groza	5	Zsuzsana Cerveni	"Billie Jean"	Lavinia Lăcătuș	—	—	∅	—
Tudor Chirilă	6	Amedeo Chiriac	"Stitches"	Teodora Rotaru	∅	—	—	—
Smiley	7	Olga Roman	"Iubirea schimbă tot"	Laura Voinu	—	∅	—	—

== Live Shows ==
Color key:

Artist was saved by the Public's votes
Artist was saved by the coach
Artist was eliminated

=== Week 1 (November 17) ===
The first group of contestants from each team competed in the first live show, which aired on Friday, November 17, 2017. The public vote could save one contestant from each team, the second one being chosen by the coach. The other two contestants were eliminated.

Episode 12 (November 17)
Coach	Order	Artist	Song	Result
Smiley	1	Ioana Barbă	"Mamma Knows Best"	Eliminated
Smiley	2	Octavian Casian	"Tears in Heaven"	Smiley's choice
Smiley	3	Olga Roman	"Believe"	Eliminated
Smiley	4	Paul Bătinaș	"Me & Mr Jones"	Public's vote
Adrian Despot	5	Valentin Poienariu	"Și ce dacă"	Eliminated
Adrian Despot	6	Andrada Crețu	"Think"	Despot's choice
Adrian Despot	7	Robert Pița	"Oh! Darling"	Public's vote
Adrian Despot	8	Oana Mirică	"What About Us"	Eliminated
Loredana Groza	9	Amalia Uruc	"Ex's & Oh's"	Loredana's choice
Loredana Groza	10	Tudor Bilețchi	"King"	Eliminated
Loredana Groza	11	Adriana Ciobanu	"Send Me an Angel"	Public's vote
Loredana Groza	12	Mihail Tirică	"Radioactive"	Eliminated
Tudor Chirilă	13	Răzvan Encuna	"Mack the Knife"	Eliminated
Tudor Chirilă	14	Meriam Jane Ndubuisi	"Weak"	Tudor's choice
Tudor Chirilă	15	Amedeo Chiriac	"Motherless Child"	Eliminated
Tudor Chirilă	16	Laurențiu Mihaiu	"Heaven on Their Minds"	Public's vote

Non-competition performances
Order	Performer	Song
1	Episode 12 contestants	"Let's Get It Started"

=== Week 2 (November 24) ===
The second group of four contestants from each team competed in the second live show, which aired on Friday, November 24, 2017. Voting proceeded as before.

Episode 13 (November 24)
Coach	Order	Artist	Song	Result
Adrian Despot	1	Andreea Dragu	"Son of a Preacher Man"	Despot's choice
Adrian Despot	2	Manó Ráduly Botond	"Hello"	Public's vote
Adrian Despot	3	Catarina Sandu	"Fighter"	Eliminated
Adrian Despot	4	Alexandru Arnăutu	"Sweet Child o' Mine"	Eliminated
Loredana Groza	5	Rufus Martin	"I Got a Woman" / "Hai acasă"	Eliminated
Loredana Groza	6	Zsuzsana Cerveni	"Papa Was a Rollin' Stone"	Public's vote
Loredana Groza	7	Bogdan Stănică	"There's Nothing Holdin' Me Back"	Eliminated
Loredana Groza	8	Diana Brescan	"A Night like This"	Loredana's choice
Tudor Chirilă	9	Daria Grigoraș	"Breakthru"	Eliminated
Tudor Chirilă	10	Ștefan Știucă	"Jersey Girl"	Public's vote
Tudor Chirilă	11	Lidia Isac	"There Must Be an Angel (Playing with My Heart)"	Eliminated
Tudor Chirilă	12	Maria Rădeanu	"The Impossible Dream"	Tudor's choice
Smiley	13	Ioana Vișinescu	"Superstition"	Eliminated
Smiley	14	Amir Arafat	"Desert Rose"	Smiley's choice
Smiley	15	Ana Munteanu	"It's a Man's Man's Man's World"	Public's vote
Smiley	16	Răzvan Mărcuci	"Dangerous"	Eliminated

Non-competition performances
Order	Performer	Song
1	Episode 13 contestants	"I Gotta Feeling"

=== Week 3 (December 1) ===
All 16 remaining contestants competed in the third live show on December 1, 2017. Voting proceeded as before.

Episode 14 (December 1)
Coach	Order	Artist	Song	Result
Tudor Chirilă	1	Maria Rădeanu	"Dor de viață"	Eliminated
Tudor Chirilă	2	Ștefan Știucă	"Drumurile"	Public's vote
Tudor Chirilă	3	Laurențiu Mihaiu	"Baby"	Eliminated
Tudor Chirilă	4	Meriam Jane Ndubuisi	"Mai frumoasă"	Tudor's choice
Loredana Groza	5	Amalia Uruc	"Inimă, nu fi de piatră"	Eliminated
Loredana Groza	6	Diana Brescan	"Pedepsește-mă, dar nu pleca" / "Ochii tăi"	Public's vote
Loredana Groza	7	Adriana Ciobanu	"I'm Wishing"/ "Someday My Prince Will Come"	Eliminated
Loredana Groza	8	Zsuzsana Cerveni	"Stairway to Heaven"	Loredana's choice
Smiley	9	Octavian Casian	"Ziua vrăjitoarelor"	Eliminated
Smiley	10	Paul Bătinaș	"Cerul"	Eliminated
Smiley	11	Ana Munteanu	"Of, inimioară"	Public's vote
Smiley	12	Amir Arafat	"Mă ucide ea"	Smiley's choice
Adrian Despot	13	Manó Ráduly Botond	"Lume, lume" /"The House of the Rising Sun"	Public's vote
Adrian Despot	14	Andreea Dragu	"Move Over"/ "Cea mai tare piesă"	Eliminated
Adrian Despot	15	Robert Pița	"Azi vii, mâine pleci"/ "Heart-Shaped Box"	Eliminated
Adrian Despot	16	Andrada Crețu	"Vama Veche"	Despot's choice

Non-competition performances
Order	Performer	Song
1	Episode 14 contestants	"RomânEști, oriunde ai fi!"

=== Week 4 (December 8) ===
All eight remaining contestants performed two songs each in the semi-final on Friday, December 8, 2017: a solo song and a trio with the coach and the other teammate. The public vote could save one contestant from each team, the second one was eliminated.

Episode 15 (December 8)
Coach	Order	Artist	Solo Song	Order	Trio Song	Result
Smiley	1	Amir Arafat	"Man in the Mirror"	9	"Uptown Funk"	Eliminated
Smiley	5	Ana Munteanu	"I'd Rather Go Blind"	9	"Uptown Funk"	Public's vote
Loredana Groza	2	Diana Brescan	"Mad About You"/"Diva iluminata"	6	"Hai la joc"	Eliminated
Loredana Groza	10	Zsuzsana Cerveni	"(Where Do I Begin?) Love Story"	6	"Hai la joc"	Public's vote
Tudor Chirilă	4	Meriam Jane Ndubuisi	"Stay with Me"	12	"Omul plajei"	Public's vote
Tudor Chirilă	8	Ștefan Știucă	"Yesterday"	12	"Omul plajei"	Eliminated
Adrian Despot	7	Manó Ráduly Botond	"I Am the Fire"	3	"Free Fallin'"	Eliminated
Adrian Despot	11	Andrada Crețu	"Nothing Else Matters"	3	"Free Fallin'"	Public's vote

Non-competition performances
Order	Performer	Song
1	Inna	"Nirvana"/"Ruleta"

=== Week 5 - Final (December 15) ===
The top 4 contestants performed in the grand final on Friday, December 15, 2017. This week, the four finalists performed a solo song, a duet with a special guest and a duet with their coach. The public vote determined the winner, and that resulted in a victory for Ana Munteanu, Smiley's second victory as a coach.

Episode 16 (December 15)
Coach	Artist	Order	Duet Song (with special guest)	Order	Duet Song (with coach)	Order	Solo Song	Result
Tudor Chirilă	Meriam Jane Ndubuisi	1	"Lume, lume" — with Ovidiu Lipan Țăndărică	9	"Oameni"	5	"Epilog"	Runner-up
Loredana Groza	Zsuzsana Cerveni	6	"Diva inamorata"/"Nessun dorma" — with Alessandro Safina	2	"The Power of Love"	10	"Bună seara, iubito!"	Third place
Smiley	Ana Munteanu	11	"The Prayer" — with Marcel Pavel	7	"La Bohème"	3	"De unde vii la ora asta?"	Winner
Adrian Despot	Andrada Crețu	8	"Who You Are" — with Mihail	4	"Numb"	12	"Fată verde"	Fourth place

Non-competition performances
Order	Performer	Song
1	The finalists	"Amazing Grace"
2	Arilena Ara	Nëntori
3	Baletul Anturaj	New Rules
4	Ana Munteanu	"La Bohème"

=== Elimination chart ===
Color key
Artist info

- Artist from Team Tudor
- Artist from Team Loredana
- Artist from Team Smiley
- Artist from Team Despot

Result details

- Winner
- Runner-up
- Third place
- Fourth place
- Artist was saved by the public vote
- Artist was saved by their coach
- Artist was eliminated

=== Overall ===
Artists	Week 1	Week 2	Week 3	Week 4	Final
Ana Munteanu	—N/a	Safe	Safe	Safe	Winner
Meriam Jane Ndubuisi	Safe	—N/a	Safe	Safe	Runner-up
Zsuzsana Cerveni	—N/a	Safe	Safe	Safe	3rd place
Andrada Crețu	Safe	—N/a	Safe	Safe	4th place
Ștefan Știucă	—N/a	Safe	Safe	Eliminated	Eliminated (Week 4)
Manó Ráduly Botond	—N/a	Safe	Safe	Eliminated	Eliminated (Week 4)
Diana Brescan	—N/a	Safe	Safe	Eliminated	Eliminated (Week 4)
Amir Arafat	—N/a	Safe	Safe	Eliminated	Eliminated (Week 4)
Andreea Dragu	—N/a	Safe	Eliminated	Eliminated (Week 3)	
Robert Pița	Safe	—N/a	Eliminated	Eliminated (Week 3)	
Paul Bătinaș	Safe	—N/a	Eliminated	Eliminated (Week 3)	
Octavian Casian	Safe	—N/a	Eliminated	Eliminated (Week 3)	
Adriana Ciobanu	Safe	—N/a	Eliminated	Eliminated (Week 3)	
Amalia Uruc	Safe	—N/a	Eliminated	Eliminated (Week 3)	
Laurențiu Mihaiu	Safe	—N/a	Eliminated	Eliminated (Week 3)	
Maria Rădeanu	—N/a	Safe	Eliminated	Eliminated (Week 3)	
Răzvan Mărcuci	—N/a	Eliminated	Eliminated (Week 2)		
Ioana Vișinescu	—N/a	Eliminated	Eliminated (Week 2)		
Daria Grigoraș	—N/a	Eliminated	Eliminated (Week 2)		
Lidia Isac	—N/a	Eliminated	Eliminated (Week 2)		
Rufus Martin	—N/a	Eliminated	Eliminated (Week 2)		
Bogdan Stănică	—N/a	Eliminated	Eliminated (Week 2)		
Alexandru Arnăutu	—N/a	Eliminated	Eliminated (Week 2)		
Catarina Sandu	—N/a	Eliminated	Eliminated (Week 2)		
Amedeo Chiriac	Eliminated	Eliminated (Week 1)			
Răzvan Encuna	Eliminated	Eliminated (Week 1)			
Tudor Bilețchi	Eliminated	Eliminated (Week 1)			
Mihail Tirică	Eliminated	Eliminated (Week 1)			
Oana Mirică	Eliminated	Eliminated (Week 1)			
Valentin Poienariu	Eliminated	Eliminated (Week 1)			
Ioana Barbă	Eliminated	Eliminated (Week 1)			
Olga Roman	Eliminated	Eliminated (Week 1)			
Reference(s)					

== Ratings ==
Episode		Original airdate	Timeslot (EET)	National					18–49			Source
Episode		Original airdate	Timeslot (EET)	Rank	Peak (in thousands)	Viewers (in thousands)	Rating (%)	Share (%)	Rank	Rating (%)	Share (%)	Source
1	"The Blind Auditions Premiere"	September 8, 2017	Friday, 20:30	1	2 100	1 699	9,4	24,8	1	11,7	38,6	
2	"The Blind Auditions, Part 2"	September 10, 2017	Sunday, 20:30	1	2 100	1 630	9,1	20,4	1	11,0	29,0	
3	"The Blind Auditions, Part 3"	September 15, 2017	Friday, 20:30	1	2 000	1 516	8,4	21,4	1	9,6	29,5	
4	"The Blind Auditions, Part 4"	September 22, 2017	Friday, 20:30	1	2 200	1 590	8,8	20,9	1	10,6	29,7	
5	"The Blind Auditions, Part 5"	September 29, 2017	Friday, 20:30	1	2 100	1 658	9,2	20,9	1	10,4	29,2	
6	"The Blind Auditions, Part 6"	October 6, 2017	Friday, 20:30	1	2 300	1 813	10,1	22,6	1	10,7	30,0	
7	"The Blind Auditions, Part 7"	October 13, 2017	Friday, 20:30	1	2 100	1 657	9,2	20,7	1	9,9	28,2	
8	"The Battles Premiere"	October 20, 2017	Friday, 20:30	1	2 000	1 406	7,8	19,0	1	9,2	27,3	
9	"The Battles, Part 2"	October 27, 2017	Friday, 20:30	1	2 000	1 450	8,1	19,2	1	8,6	25,2	
10	"The Battles, Part 3"	November 3, 2017	Friday, 20:30	1	2 000	1 390	7,7	18,8	1	8,0	22,8	
11	"The Battles, Part 4"	November 10, 2017	Friday, 20:30	2	1 800	1 242	6,9	16,4	1	8,9	25,1	
12	"Live show 1"	November 17, 2017	Friday, 20:30	1	1 700	1 025	5,7	16,4	1	7,2	23,1	
13	"Live show 2"	November 24, 2017	Friday, 20:30	1	1 600	1 036	5,8	16,4	1	7,2	24,0	
14	"Live show 3"	December 1, 2017	Friday, 20:30	2	1 500	920	5,1	14,0	1	6,0	19,6	
15	"Semifinal"	December 8, 2017	Friday, 20:30	1	1 700	1 204	6,7	17,1	1	8,0	24,1	
16	"Final"	December 15, 2017	Friday, 20:30	1	1 872	1 423	8,0	19,7	1	8,8	24,5	
