= Vocea României season 5 =

Vocea României
- Season 5
- Hosted by: Pavel Bartoș
- Coaches: Tudor Chirilă; Loredana Groza; Smiley; Marius Moga
- Winner: Cristina Bălan
- Winning coach: Tudor Chirilă
- Runner-up: Tomi Weissbuch
- No. of episodes: 15

Release
- Original network: ProTV
- Original release: September 18 – December 18, 2015

Season chronology
- ← Previous; Season 4 Next → Season 6

The fifth season of the Romanian reality talent show Vocea României premiered on ProTV on September 18, 2015. The hosts and the coaches from the previous season have all returned.

This season brought rule changes. Firstly, during the blind auditions, the coaches' chairs only turned around at the end of the performance if at least one of them had pressed the "I WANT YOU" button. Lastly, in the semi-final, each of the eight contestants engaged in a "crossed duel" with a contestant from another team. The winner of the duel was selected by public vote only. This opened up the possibility of coaches ending up with 0, 1 or 2 contestants in the final.

The season finale aired on December 18, 2015. Teams Tudor and Moga had one finalist each, while Team Smiley had two. Both semi-finalists in Team Loredana had been eliminated. Cristina Bălan, best known as the lead vocalist of the bands Impact and ABCD and mentored by Tudor Chirilă, was declared winner of the season. It was Chirilă's second consecutive victory as a coach.

== Pre-selections ==
Cities where the pre-selections were held.

Pre-selections took place in the following cities:

Location	Date	Venue
Cluj-Napoca	May 24, 2015	Hotel Golden Tulip Ana Dome
Iași	May 31, 2015	Hotel Unirea
Brașov	June 14, 2015	Hotel Kronwell
Timișoara	June 21, 2015	Hotel Continental
Bucharest	June 27, 2015	Hotel IBIS Gara de Nord

== Teams ==
Color key

- Winner
- Runner-up
- Third place
- Fourth place
- Eliminated in the live shows
- Artist was stolen by another coach
- Eliminated in the battle rounds

Coaches	Top 56 artists				
Tudor Chirilă					
Tudor Chirilă	Cristina Bălan	Tincuța Fernea	Cristina Lupu	Sabrina Stroe	Claudia Andas
Tudor Chirilă	Daniel Bălan	Roxana Morar	Armand Murzea	~~Florentina Ciună~~	~~Delia Pitu~~
Tudor Chirilă	Andreea Manasia	Ovidiu Turcu	Paula Rotar	Adrian Stănescu	Florina Călin
Marius Moga					
Marius Moga	Tomi Weissbuch	Alex Florea	Delia Pitu	Irina Pelin	Cristina Stroe
Marius Moga	Andrei Vitan	Elvis Silitră	Adrian Tănase	Lorena Stoian	Andreea Oprea
Marius Moga	Luciana Ștefan	Florin Cruceru	Mădălina Rusu	Jessie Baneș	Ioana Sapianu
Smiley					
Smiley	Tobi Ibitoye	Michel Kotcha	Larisa Ciortan	Nora Deneș	Diana Cazan
Smiley	Diana Hetea	Ruxandra Anania	Sergiu Ferat	Cristina Popa	Tudor Ion
Smiley	Alina Colțan	Ana Maria Ababei	Nicoleta Hăpăianu	Andreea Vătavu	Ștefan Liche
Loredana Groza					
Loredana Groza	Antonio Fabrizi	Mihai Dragomir Rait	Florentina Ciună	Cristina Vasopol	Iulian Selea
Loredana Groza	Bogdan Vlădău	Gabriela Amzaru	Alexandra Mitroi	~~Daniel Bălan~~	~~Diana Hetea~~
Loredana Groza	Alin Pascal	Sara Maria Mihali	Tonina Tarnosche	Biu Marquetti	Elena Niciu
Note: Italicized names are stolen contestants (names struck through within former teams).

== Blind auditions ==
The first phase of the competition, the blind auditions, taped July 25–26 and August 3–4, 2015, at the Kentauros Studios, Ștefăneștii de Jos, began airing when the season premiered on September 18, 2015.

Color key

✔	Coach hit his/her "I WANT YOU" button
	Artist defaulted to this coach's team
	Artist elected to join this coach's team
	Artist eliminated with no coach pressing his or her "I WANT YOU" button

=== Episode 1 (September 18) ===
The first of seven pre-recorded audition episodes aired on Friday, September 18, 2015.

Order	Artist	Age	Hometown	Song	Coach's and contestant's choices			
Order	Artist	Age	Hometown	Song	Tudor	Loredana	Smiley	Moga
1	Claudia Andas	39	Bucharest	"The Best"	✔	✔	✔	✔
2	Florin Cruceru	31	Bucharest	"Billionaire"	—	—	—	✔
3	Angela Bîtlan	19	Galați, Galați	"Because You Loved Me"	—	—	—	—
4	Ovidiu Turcu	31	Bucharest	"The Great Pretender"	✔	—	✔	✔
5	Biu Marquetti	40	Bucharest	"Sólo se vive una vez"	—	✔	—	—
6	Liviu Bazu	62	Mentana, Italy	"My Way"	—	—	—	—
7	Ali Hamid Aṣer Dan	21	Bucharest	"Buffalo Soldier"	—	—	—	—
8	Cristina Vasopol	35	Galați, Galați	"Cry Baby"	✔	✔	✔	✔
9	Alexandra Boghici	27	Galați, Galați	"Stop!"	—	—	—	—
10	Michel Kotcha	23	Yamoussoukro, Ivory Coast	"Forget You"	✔	✔	✔	✔
11	Cristina Stroe	23	Bucharest	"Dor de viață"	✔	—	—	✔
12	Roxana Sorina Tătaru	38	Ploiești, Prahova	"Saving All My Love for You"	—	—	—	—
13	Diana Cazan	27	Craiova, Dolj	"Clown"	✔	—	✔	✔

=== Episode 2 (September 25) ===
The second episode aired on September 25, 2015.

Order	Artist	Age	Hometown	Song	Coach's and contestant's choices			
Order	Artist	Age	Hometown	Song	Tudor	Loredana	Smiley	Moga
1	Ștefan Liche	16	Bacău, Bacău	"De-ai fi tu salcie la mal"	✔	—	✔	✔
2	Cristina Bălan	34	Bucharest	"Down on My Knees"	✔	✔	✔	✔
3	Mihai Baneș	46	Oradea, Bihor	"L-O-V-E"	—	—	—	—
4	Jessie Baneș	19	Oradea, Bihor	"Mama Do (Uh Oh, Uh Oh)"	—	—	—	✔
5	Cristina Lupu	24	Bucharest	"That Don't Impress Me Much"	✔	—	✔	✔
6	Ion Oprea Cortez	48	Bucharest	"Englishman in New York"	—	—	—	—
7	Daniel Bălan	23	Bucharest	"La bohème"	✔	✔	✔	✔
8	Gioconda Mimi Danilescu	51	Bucharest	"I'm So Excited"	—	—	—	—
9	Ana Maria Ababei	20	Iași, Iași	"Love Me like You Do"	—	—	✔	✔
10	Tudor Ion	26	Bucharest	"So Sick"	—	—	✔	—
11	Laura Bodorin	22	Chișinău, Moldova	"Crazy"	—	—	—	—
12	Elie Haddad	33	Bucharest	"Enter Sandman"	—	—	—	—
13	Roxana Morar	17	Brașov, Brașov	"Under"	✔	—	—	✔

=== Episode 3 (October 2) ===
The third episode was aired on October 2, 2015.

Order	Artist	Age	Hometown	Song	Coach's and contestant's choices			
Order	Artist	Age	Hometown	Song	Tudor	Loredana	Smiley	Moga
1	Sabrina Stroe	18	Brașov, Brașov	"Billie Jean"	✔	—	—	✔
2	Armand Murzea	36	Bucharest	"Your Man"	✔	—	—	—
3	Daniela Bayer	48	Ploiești, Prahova	"Respect"	—	—	—	—
4	Bogdan Vlădău	35	Bucharest	"Use Somebody"	—	✔	—	✔
5	Mădălina Rusu	17	Gherla, Cluj	"Proud Mary"	—	—	—	✔
6	Iulia Stoica	21	Sibiu, Sibiu	"I Want to Break Free"	—	—	—	—
7	Mihai Dragomir Rait	35	Bucharest	"Zaraza"	—	✔	✔	✔
8	Andreea Vătavu	24	Galați, Galați	"Hey Mama"	—	—	✔	✔
9	Robert Pascari	27	Gura Humorului, Suceava	"Take On Me"	—	—	—	—
10	Doina Spătaru	29	Chișinău, Moldova	"Valerie"	—	—	—	—
11	Andrei Vitan	24	Brașov, Brașov	"Feeling Good"	✔	✔	✔	✔
12	Răzvan Munteanu	31	Timișoara, Timiș	"White Wedding"	—	—	—	—
13	Florentina Ciună	27	Bucharest	"Fallin'"	✔	✔	✔	✔

=== Episode 4 (October 9) ===
The fourth episode aired on October 9, 2015.

Order	Artist	Age	Hometown	Song	Coach's and contestant's choices			
Order	Artist	Age	Hometown	Song	Tudor	Loredana	Smiley	Moga
1	Elvis Silitră	21	Bucharest	"Time Is Running Out"	✔	✔	✔	✔
2	Alina Colțan	28	Craiova, Dolj	"Empire State of Mind"	—	—	✔	—
3	Theodor Rusu	25	Bucharest	"Enjoy the Silence"	—	—	—	—
4	Irina Pelin	24	Craiova, Dolj	"(You Make Me Feel Like) A Natural Woman"	—	—	—	✔
5	Corina Cojocaru	23	Bucharest	"Mercy"	—	—	—	—
6	Antonio Fabrizi	36	Bucharest	"Caruso"	✔	✔	✔	✔
7	Florina Călin	33	Bucharest	"Nobody's Wife"	✔	—	—	—
8	Elena Buga	26	Chișinău, Moldova	"Welcome to Burlesque"	—	—	—	—
9	Filip Emanuel Dongo	18	Tomnatic, Timiș	"Here Without You"	—	—	—	—
10	Larisa Ciortan	26	Constanța, Constanța	"Smells like Teen Spirit"	✔	✔	✔	✔
11	Robert-Nicolae Feraru	17	Bucharest	"Oameni"	—	—	—	—
12	Lorena Stoian	18	Bucharest	"See You Again"	—	—	—	✔
13	Adrian Stănescu	22	Tărtășești, Dâmbovița	"Purple Rain"	✔	✔	—	✔

=== Episode 5 (October 16) ===
The fifth episode aired on October 16, 2015.

Order	Artist	Age	Hometown	Song	Coach's and contestant's choices			
Order	Artist	Age	Hometown	Song	Tudor	Loredana	Smiley	Moga
1	Tincuța Fernea	16	Satu Mare, Satu Mare	"When I Was Your Man"	✔	—	—	✔
2	Alin Pascal	34	Bistrița, Bistrița-Năsăud	"Historia de un amor"	—	✔	—	—
3	Speranța Vasiliu	47	Iași, Iași	"Mon mec à moi"	—	—	—	—
4	Tomi Weissbuch	17	Bucharest	"Thinking Out Loud"	—	—	—	✔
5	Nicoleta Hăpăianu	18	Timișoara, Timiș	"Say You Love Me"	✔	—	✔	✔
6	Cătălina Antal	24	Bucharest	"All I Could Do Was Cry"	—	—	—	—
7	Ionuț Botea	35	Deta, Timiș	"Locked Out of Heaven"	—	—	—	—
8	Elena Niciu	33	Petroșani, Hunedoara	"Non, je ne regrette rien"	✔	✔	—	—
9	Andreea Oprea	17	Bucharest	"It's a Man's Man's Man's World"	—	—	—	✔
10	Gabriel Ionuț Cîndea	22	Orăștie, Hunedoara	"Home"	—	—	—	—
11	Alexandra Mitroi	24	Timișoara, Timiș	"Can't Remember to Forget You"	—	✔	—	—
12	Andreea Cârstea	20	Brașov, Brașov	"Seven Nation Army"	—	—	—	—
13	Ruxandra Anania	36	Bucharest	"This World"	✔	✔	✔	✔

=== Episode 6 (October 23) ===
The sixth episode was aired on October 23, 2015.

Order	Artist	Age	Hometown	Song	Coach's and contestant's choices			
Order	Artist	Age	Hometown	Song	Tudor	Loredana	Smiley	Moga
1	Iulian Selea	16	Pitești, Argeș	"Take Me to Church"	—	✔	—	—
2	Paula Rotar	23	Cluj-Napoca, Cluj	"Sail"	✔	✔	✔	—
3	Robert Pița	17	Brașov, Brașov	"N'oubliez jamais"	—	—	—	—
4	Nora Deneș	33	Baia Mare, Maramureș	"Highway to Hell"	✔	✔	✔	✔
5	Adrian Tănase	24	Bucharest	"When a Man Loves a Woman"	✔	—	✔	✔
6	Diana Culic	27	Cluj-Napoca, Cluj	"FourFiveSeconds"	—	—	—	—
7	Aurelian-Ionuț Faur	29	Târgoviște, Dâmbovița	"Suspicious Minds"	—	—	—	—
8	Luciana Ștefan	22	Bucharest	"Trouble with My Baby"	—	✔	—	✔
9	Tobi Ibitoye	22	Lagos, Nigeria	"It's a Man's Man's Man's World"	✔	—	✔	—
10	Raluca Dumitrescu	20	Arad, Arad	"Oh! Darling"	—	—	—	—
11	Tonina Tarnosche	28	Bucharest	"Walking in Memphis"	—	✔	—	—
12	Mircea Crîșmăreanu	39	Brașov, Brașov	"Unchain My Heart"	—	—	—	—
13	Delia Pitu	21	Constanța, Constanța	"If I Ain't Got You"	✔	—	—	✔

=== Episode 7 (October 30) ===
The seventh and last blind audition episode aired on October 30, 2015.

Order	Artist	Age	Hometown	Song	Coach's and contestant's choices			
Order	Artist	Age	Hometown	Song	Tudor	Loredana	Smiley	Moga
1	Diana Hetea	36	Timișoara, Timiș	"Make You Feel My Love"	✔	✔	✔	✔
2	Gabriela Amzaru	16	Călărași, Călărași	"Ileană"	—	✔	✔	—
3	Alex Florea	23	Constanța, Constanța	"Bed of Roses"	—	✔	—	✔
4	Claudia Hallo	28	Bucharest	"Waiting All Night"	—	—	—	—
5	Florin Gheorghe Mureșan	42	Deva, Hunedoara	"Delilah"	—	—	—	—
6	Ioana Sapianu	26	Sânnicolau Mare, Timiș	"Radioactive"	—	—	✔	✔
7	Sergiu Ferat	35	Bacău, Bacău	"Man in the Mirror"	—	—	✔	—
8	Florin Voșloban	34	Reghin, Mureș	"Hey Brother"	—	—	—	—
9	Sara Maria Mihali	17	Baia Mare, Maramureș	"Rise Like a Phoenix"	—	✔	✔	—
10	Adriana Gavrilă	21	Călărași, Călărași	"Spune-mi"	—	—	—	—
11	Cristina Popa	31	Bucharest	"Lean On"	—	—	✔	—
12	Sebastian Tudor	18	Roman, Neamț	"Wake Me Up!"	—	—	—	—
13	Cristina Baban	29	Chișinău, Moldova	"Wrecking Ball"	—	—	—	—
14	Andreea Manasia	21	Bucharest	"If I Were a Boy"	✔	—	—	—

== The battles ==
After the blind auditions, each coach had fourteen contestants for the battle rounds, which aired November 6–20, 2015. Coaches began narrowing down the playing field by training the contestants. Each episode featured nine or ten battles consisting of pairings from within each team, and each battle concluding with the respective coach eliminating one of the two contestants. Each coach could steal one losing contestant from another team, thus saving them from elimination.

Color key:

Artist won the Battle and advanced to the Knockouts
Artist lost the Battle but was stolen by another coach and advanced to the Knockouts
Artist lost the Battle and was eliminated

=== Episode 8 (6 November) ===
The eighth episode aired on November 6, 2015.

Coach	Order	Winner	Song	Loser	'Steal' result			
Coach	Order	Winner	Song	Loser	Tudor	Loredana	Smiley	Moga
Loredana Groza	1	Bogdan Vlădău	"Kids"	Elena Niciu	—	—N/a	—	—
Smiley	2	Diana Cazan	"I Just Can't Stop Loving You"	Ștefan Liche	—	—	—N/a	—
Smiley	3	Larisa Ciortan	"Give It to Me Right"	Andreea Vătavu	—	—	—N/a	—
Marius Moga	4	Alex Florea	"Crazy"	Ioana Sapianu	—	—	—	—N/a
Tudor Chirilă	5	Claudia Andas	"Rolling in the Deep"	Florina Călin	—N/a	—	—	—
Smiley	6	Ruxandra Anania	"Crazy in Love (2014 Remix)"	Nicoleta Hăpăianu	—	—	—N/a	—
Loredana Groza	7	Cristina Vasopol	"Sisters Are Doin' It for Themselves"	Diana Hetea	—	—N/a	✔	—
Tudor Chirilă	8	Armand Murzea	"Losing My Religion"	Adrian Stănescu	—N/a	—	—	—
Marius Moga	9	Andrei Vitan	"Need You Now"	Jessie Baneș	—	—	—	—N/a

=== Episode 9 (13 November) ===
The ninth episode aired on November 13, 2015.

Coach	Order	Winner	Song	Loser	'Steal' result			
Coach	Order	Winner	Song	Loser	Tudor	Loredana	Smiley	Moga
Smiley	1	Michel Kotcha	"Master Blaster (Jammin')"	Ana Maria Ababei	—	—	—N/a	—
Tudor Chirilă	2	Roxana Morar	"(I Can't Get No) Satisfaction"	Delia Pitu	—N/a	—	—	✔
Loredana Groza	3	Mihai Dragomir Rait	"That's Amore"	Biu Marquetti	—	—N/a	—	—
Marius Moga	4	Tomi Weissbuch	"You're the One That I Want"	Mădălina Rusu	—	—	—	—N/a
Tudor Chirilă	5	Cristina Bălan	"Sober"	Paula Rotar	—N/a	—	—	—
Smiley	6	Nora Deneș	"Hound Dog"	Alina Colțan	—	—	—N/a	—
Marius Moga	7	Elvis Silitră	"Creep"	Florin Cruceru	—	—	—	—N/a
Loredana Groza	8	Gabriela Amzaru	"Next to Me"	Tonina Tarnosche	—	—N/a	—	—
Tudor Chirilă	9	Cristina Lupu	"Till We Ain't Strangers Anymore"	Ovidiu Turcu	—N/a	—	—	—

=== Episode 10 (20 November) ===
The tenth episode aired on November 20, 2015.

Coach	Order	Winner	Song	Loser	'Steal' result			
Coach	Order	Winner	Song	Loser	Tudor	Loredana	Smiley	Moga
Smiley	1	Tobi Ibitoye	"What a Wonderful World"	Tudor Ion	—	—	—N/a	—
Marius Moga	2	Cristina Stroe	"No Diggity"	Luciana Ștefan	—	—	—	—N/a
Loredana Groza	3	Iulian Selea	"Impossible"	Daniel Bălan	✔	—N/a	✔	✔
Tudor Chirilă	4	Sabrina Stroe	"Talkin' 'bout a Revolution"	Andreea Manasia	—N/a	—	—	—
Smiley	5	Sergiu Ferat	"One Sweet Day"	Cristina Popa	—	—	—N/a	—
Marius Moga	6	Irina Pelin	"Ironic"	Andreea Oprea	—	—	—	—N/a
Loredana Groza	7	Antonio Fabrizi	"Don't Let the Sun Go Down on Me"	Sara Maria Mihali	—	—N/a	—	—
Loredana Groza	8	Alexandra Mitroi	"We've Got Tonight"	Alin Pascal	—	—N/a	—	—
Marius Moga	9	Adrian Tănase	"All My Life"	Lorena Stoian	—	—	—	—N/a
Tudor Chirilă	10	Tincuța Fernea	"Proud Mary"	Florentina Ciună	—N/a	✔	—	—

== Live shows ==
Color key

Artist was saved by the public vote
Artist was chosen by their coach
Artist was eliminated

=== Live Playoffs (Week 1 & Week 2.1) ===
Four contestants from each team competed in each of the Live Playoffs, which aired on Friday, November 27, and Tuesday, December 1, 2015. In either of the two shows, the public vote could save one contestant from each team, the second one being chosen by the coach. The other two contestants were eliminated.

==== Week 1 (November 27) ====
Episode 11 (November 27)
Coach	Order	Artist	Song	Result
Smiley	1	Tobi Ibitoye	"Freedom!"	Smiley's choice
Smiley	2	Larisa Ciortan	"Nothing Else Matters"	Public vote
Smiley	3	Ruxandra Anania	"You Know I'm No Good"	Eliminated
Smiley	4	Sergiu Ferat	"I Believe I Can Fly"	Eliminated
Tudor Chirilă	5	Roxana Morar	"Best of You"	Eliminated
Tudor Chirilă	6	Armand Murzea	"Perfect Day"	Eliminated
Tudor Chirilă	7	Sabrina Stroe	"Rehab"	Tudor's choice
Tudor Chirilă	8	Cristina Lupu	"Nothing Compares 2 U"	Public vote
Loredana Groza	9	Gabriela Amzaru	"Paris (Ooh La La)"	Eliminated
Loredana Groza	10	Antonio Fabrizi	"Eternitate"	Public vote
Loredana Groza	11	Florentina Ciună	"And I Am Telling You I'm Not Going"	Loredana's choice
Loredana Groza	12	Alexandra Mitroi	"Black Velvet"	Eliminated
Marius Moga	13	Delia Pitu	"Somebody That I Used to Know"	Public vote
Marius Moga	14	Elvis Silitră	"Can't Feel My Face"	Eliminated
Marius Moga	15	Irina Pelin	"Hello"	Moga's choice
Marius Moga	16	Adrian Tănase	"Mirrors"	Eliminated

Non-competition performances
Order	Performer	Song
1	Antonia	Mash-up: "Dream About My Face" / "I Got You"

==== Week 2.1 (December 1) ====
Episode 12 (December 1)
Coach	Order	Artist	Song	Result
Loredana Groza	1	Cristina Vasopol	"Ană, zorile se varsă"	Loredana's choice
Loredana Groza	2	Iulian Selea	"Uptown Funk"	Eliminated
Loredana Groza	3	Mihai Dragomir Rait	"Drumurile noastre"	Public vote
Loredana Groza	4	Bogdan Vlădău	"Earned It"	Eliminated
Marius Moga	5	Cristina Stroe	"Lume, lume"	Eliminated
Marius Moga	6	Alex Florea	"I'd Do Anything for Love (But I Won't Do That)"	Moga's choice
Marius Moga	7	Andrei Vitan	"Timpul"	Eliminated
Marius Moga	8	Tomi Weissbuch	"Lay Me Down"	Public vote
Tudor Chirilă	9	Cristina Bălan	"Un actor grăbit"	Tudor's choice
Tudor Chirilă	10	Daniel Bălan	"Photograph"	Eliminated
Tudor Chirilă	11	Tincuța Fernea	"America's Sweetheart"	Public vote
Tudor Chirilă	12	Claudia Andas	"Te-aștept să vii"	Eliminated
Smiley	13	Michel Kotcha	"Writing's on the Wall"	Public vote
Smiley	14	Nora Deneș	"De la capăt"	Smiley's choice
Smiley	15	Diana Cazan	"Cine te crezi?"	Eliminated
Smiley	16	Diana Hetea	"You Lost Me"	Eliminated

Non-competition performances
Order	Performer	Song
1	Episode 12 contestants	"Deșteaptă-te, române!"
2	Alina Dincă and episode 11 winners	"Fii TU România"

=== Quarterfinals (Week 2.2) ===
All 16 remaining contestants competed in the third live show on Friday, December 4, 2015. Voting proceeded as before, except the show started imposing a limit of 5 votes per phone number.

Episode 13 (December 4)
Coach	Order	Artist	Song	Result
Tudor Chirilă	1	Cristina Lupu	"Blue Suede Shoes"	Eliminated
Tudor Chirilă	2	Sabrina Stroe	"A Woman Left Lonely"	Eliminated
Tudor Chirilă	3	Tincuța Fernea	"Listen"	Public vote
Tudor Chirilă	4	Cristina Bălan	"Squander"	Tudor's choice
Smiley	5	Larisa Ciortan	"What's Up?"	Eliminated
Smiley	6	Michel Kotcha	"Rolling in the Deep"	Smiley's choice
Smiley	7	Nora Deneș	"Roxanne"^{1}	Eliminated
Smiley	8	Tobi Ibitoye	"Beneath Your Beautiful"	Public vote
Marius Moga	9	Delia Pitu	"Read All About It, Pt. III"	Eliminated
Marius Moga	10	Irina Pelin	"Because of You"	Eliminated
Marius Moga	11	Alex Florea	"Banii vorbesc"	Public vote
Marius Moga	12	Tomi Weissbuch	"Epilog"	Moga's choice
Loredana Groza	13	Antonio Fabrizi	"Pensieri e parole"	Public vote
Loredana Groza	14	Cristina Vasopol	"I Put a Spell on You"	Eliminated
Loredana Groza	15	Mihai Dragomir Rait	"With a Little Help from My Friends"	Loredana's choice
Loredana Groza	16	Florentina Ciună	"Somewhere"	Eliminated

^{1} The performance also contained a whistled snippet of "Oarecare", a Smiley song.

Non-competition performances
Order	Performer	Song
1	Feli	"Creioane colorate"

=== Semi-final (Week 3) ===
The semi-final aired on Friday, December 11, 2015, and featured four "crossed duels" consisting of pairings of contestants from different teams. Each contestant performed a single song. The outcome of each duel was decided by public vote only. With the elimination of Antonio Fabrizi and Mihai Dragomir Rait, Loredana no longer had any artist remaining on her team.

Episode 14 (December 11)
Coach	Duel	Artist	Song	Result
Smiley	1	Michel Kotcha	"Who's Lovin' You"	Advanced
Loredana Groza	1	Antonio Fabrizi	"Senza parole" / "Meravigliosa creatura"	Eliminated
Loredana Groza	2	Mihai Dragomir Rait	"Can't Take My Eyes Off You"	Emilinated
Tudor Chirilă	2	Cristina Bălan	"Gethsemane (I Only Want to Say)"	Advanced
Tudor Chirilă	3	Tincuța Fernea	"The Winner Takes It All"	Eliminated
Marius Moga	3	Tomi Weissbuch	"Preocupat cu gura ta"	Advanced
Marius Moga	4	Alex Florea	"Atât de singur"	Eliminated
Smiley	4	Tobi Ibitoye	"Make It Rain"	Advanced

Non-competition performances
Order	Performer	Song
1	DOC and Smiley	"Pierdut buletin"
2	Loredana Groza	"A ta mireasă"
3	Vama	"Declar pierdută țară"
4	Angelo Simonică and Nicole Cherry	"Pot eu să te urăsc?"
5	PRO Dance Crew	Dance inspired by the Star Wars franchise

=== Final (Week 4) ===
The top 4 contestants performed in the grand final on Friday, December 18, 2015. This week, the four finalists performed a solo song, a duet with a well-known musician (or group of musicians) and a duet with their coach. The public vote determined the winner, and that resulted in a victory for Cristina Bălan, Tudor Chirilă's second consecutive victory as a coach.

Episode 15 (December 18)
Coach	Artist	Order	Solo song	Order	Duet song (with musician)	Order	Duet song (with coach)	Result
Smiley	Tobi Ibitoye	1	"Feeling Good" / "I Got You (I Feel Good)"	5	"Jealous" (with Alina Eremia)	9	"Acasă"	Third place
Smiley	Michel Kotcha	4	"Unchained Melody"	8	"Și îngerii au demonii lor" (with Dan Bittman)	9	"Acasă"	Fourth place
Marius Moga	Tomi Weissbuch	10	"Fix You"	2	"România" / "Return to Innocence" (with Andra)	6	"Wonderwall" / "Tot mai sus"	Runner-up
Tudor Chirilă	Cristina Bălan	7	"This Is My Life"	11	"The Show Must Go On" (with the Royal Choir)	3	"Vama Veche"	Winner

Non-competition performances
Order	Performer	Song
1	Vița de Vie	"Praf de stele"
2	Loredana Groza, Florentina Ciună, Antonio Fabrizi, Iulian Selea, Cristina Vasopol	"Te iubesc"
3	Fameless^{2}	"For the Love of God"
4	Cristina Bălan	"This Is My Life" (winning reprise)

^{2} The band of season 4 winner Tiberiu Albu.

== Elimination chart ==
Color key
Artist info

- Artist from Team Tudor
- Artist from Team Loredana
- Artist from Team Smiley
- Artist from Team Moga

Result details

- Winner
- Runner-up
- Third place
- Fourth place
- Artist was saved by the public vote
- Artist was saved by their coach
- Artist was eliminated

=== Overall ===
#	Week 1	Week 2		Week 3	Final
#	Week 1	Tuesday	Friday	Week 3	Final
Cristina Bălan	—N/a	Safe	Safe	Safe	Winner
Tomi Weissbuch	—N/a	Safe	Safe	Safe	Runner-up
Tobi Ibitoye	Safe	—N/a	Safe	Safe	3rd place
Michel Kotcha	—N/a	Safe	Safe	Safe	4th place
Alex Florea	—N/a	Safe	Safe	Eliminated	Eliminated (Week 3)
Tincuța Fernea	—N/a	Safe	Safe	Eliminated	Eliminated (Week 3)
Mihai Dragomir Rait	—N/a	Safe	Safe	Eliminated	Eliminated (Week 3)
Antonio Fabrizi	Safe	—N/a	Safe	Eliminated	Eliminated (Week 3)
Florentina Ciună	Safe	—N/a	Eliminated	Eliminated (Week 2.2)	
Cristina Vasopol	—N/a	Safe	Eliminated	Eliminated (Week 2.2)	
Irina Pelin	Safe	—N/a	Eliminated	Eliminated (Week 2.2)	
Delia Pitu	Safe	—N/a	Eliminated	Eliminated (Week 2.2)	
Larisa Ciortan	Safe	—N/a	Eliminated	Eliminated (Week 2.2)	
Nora Deneș	—N/a	Safe	Eliminated	Eliminated (Week 2.2)	
Cristina Lupu	Safe	—N/a	Eliminated	Eliminated (Week 2.2)	
Sabrina Stroe	Safe	—N/a	Eliminated	Eliminated (Week 2.2)	
Diana Cazan	—N/a	Eliminated	Eliminated (Week 2.1)		
Diana Hetea	—N/a	Eliminated	Eliminated (Week 2.1)		
Claudia Andas	—N/a	Eliminated	Eliminated (Week 2.1)		
Daniel Bălan	—N/a	Eliminated	Eliminated (Week 2.1)		
Cristina Stroe	—N/a	Eliminated	Eliminated (Week 2.1)		
Andrei Vitan	—N/a	Eliminated	Eliminated (Week 2.1)		
Iulian Selea	—N/a	Eliminated	Eliminated (Week 2.1)		
Bogdan Vlădău	—N/a	Eliminated	Eliminated (Week 2.1)		
Elvis Silitră	Eliminated	Eliminated (Week 1)			
Adrian Tănase	Eliminated	Eliminated (Week 1)			
Gabriela Amzaru	Eliminated	Eliminated (Week 1)			
Alexandra Mitroi	Eliminated	Eliminated (Week 1)			
Roxana Morar	Eliminated	Eliminated (Week 1)			
Armand Murzea	Eliminated	Eliminated (Week 1)			
Ruxandra Anania	Eliminated	Eliminated (Week 1)			
Sergiu Ferat	Eliminated	Eliminated (Week 1)			
Reference(s)					

== Controversies ==
=== Pre-selection bias accusations ===
Multiple contestants eliminated in the pre-selection phase accused Loredana Groza of bias toward the students at her private singing school. According to them, Lucia Ciobotaru, one of the teachers at this school, was on the pre-selection judging panel.

=== Liviu Bazu audition scandal ===
Contestant Liviu Bazu, who had sung in well-known Romanian bands, such as FFN, Cromatic and Basorelief, and who had appeared in the first episode of the season, claimed that the coaches had been "influenced and manipulated" by Czech producer Peter Majeský, so that they would not press their buttons during his audition. The two had had an argument a few days before, at the rehearsals, because Majeský was smoking in the studio. Bazu stated that, in the wake of the incident, he had decided to kick up a fuss after his audition, since he was sure that it was going to be unsuccessful. After his audition, Bazu expressed his outrage at the production team, declaring that it "destroyed a legend". The contestant also claimed that the production team had insisted that he should participate and that his audition song had been imposed upon him. There has been no statement from ProTV regarding the incident.

=== Tincuța Fernea publicity campaign ===
Tincuța Fernea, a native of Satu Mare and one of the season 5 semi-finalists, was at the center of a media scandal, in the wake of an aggressive publicity campaign promoting the singer, started by the Satu Mare County Council. Fernea's coach, Tudor Chirilă, disapproved of the campaign on his personal blog, criticizing the political involvement of the council in the show and the fact that the council had spent public funds and used pictures of him without consent. Chirilă also stated that the actions of the authorities of Satu Mare had been very unfair towards the other competitors and advised the viewers not to take the artists' origin or artistic past into consideration when voting. Fernea was saved by the public vote twice: in episodes 12 and 13. The coach considered that Fernea had a poor performance in episode 12, which she made up for in episode 13. The involvement of the Satu Mare County Council spawned negative reactions among some viewers who complained about the abundance of posters advising readers to vote for the artist. ProTV requested the removal of the posters, on the ground that they included the logo of the show and pictures of Tudor Chirilă without consent. The president of the council, Adrian Ștef, stated that he found the intention of supporting the contestant natural. Ștef apologized to ProTV and the other contestants, while denying any underlying political motive to the campaign. He also denied any accusations of bias, mentioning that the Satu Mare County Council had made a similar campaign in 2013, in order to support singer Bogdan Bratiș, who came fourth in the third season of the Romanian version of The X Factor.

=== Participation of celebrities in the contest ===
The participation of Cristina Bălan, the winner of the season and former lead singer of the band Impact, spawned negative reactions among some viewers who considered that the artist had an unfair advantage due to the popularity of the band in Romania in the 2000s. Biu Marquetti, Bogdan Vlădău and Mihai Dragomir had also had various degrees of popularity before participating. Bălan expressed surprise at her own victory and explained that her participation was not against the rules of the contest. She also stated that she saw Vocea României as a chance to restart her music career, after a long period of inactivity.

== Ratings ==
Stage	#	Original airdate	Timeslot (EEST / EET)	Target															Sources
Stage	#	Original airdate	Timeslot (EEST / EET)	National					Urban					18–49					Sources
Stage	#	Original airdate	Timeslot (EEST / EET)	Rk	Pk (000)	Avg (000)	Rtg (%)	Shr (%)	Rk	Pk (000)	Avg (000)	Rtg (%)	Shr (%)	Rk	Pk (000)	Avg (000)	Rtg (%)	Shr (%)	Sources
Blind auditions	1	September 18, 2015	Friday, 8:30 PM	1	2,000	1,570	8.5	20.4	1	—N/a	882	8.7	21.2	1	—N/a	513	10.2	30.7	
Blind auditions	2	September 25, 2015	Friday, 8:30 PM	1	2,100	1,565	8.5	17.5	1	—N/a	1,011	10.0	20.9	1	—N/a	593	11.7	27.7	
Blind auditions	3	October 2, 2015	Friday, 8:30 PM	1	2,491	1,792	9.7	20.7	1	1,676	1,169	11.6	24.0	1	1,005	706	13.9	32.6	
Blind auditions	4	October 9, 2015	Friday, 8:30 PM	1	2,564	1,948	10.6	21.8	1	1,510	1,181	11.7	24.5	1	900	707	14.0	32.6	
Blind auditions	5	October 16, 2015	Friday, 8:30 PM	1	2,382	1,764	9.6	19.7	1	1,325	1,008	10.0	20.9	1	724	565	11.1	27.9	
Blind auditions	6	October 23, 2015	Friday, 8:30 PM	1	2,313	1,809	9.8	20.8	1	1,413	1,118	11.1	23.0	1	838	685	13.5	32.0	
Blind auditions	7	October 30, 2015	Friday, 8:30 PM	1	2,341	1,768	9.6	20.4	1	1,408	1,071	10.6	22.1	1	836	661	13.0	31.3	
Battles	8	November 6, 2015	Friday, 8:30 PM	1	2,271	1,336	7.2	17.0	1	1,276	893	8.9	19.8	1	654	514	10.2	25.3	
Battles	9	November 13, 2015	Friday, 8:30 PM	1	2,077	1,449	7.9	19.0	1	1,287	899	8.9	20.7	1	748	534	10.6	28.3	
Battles	10	November 20, 2015	Friday, 8:30 PM	1	2,002	1,297	7.0	17.3	1	1,147	828	8.2	19.7	1	625	492	9.7	26.2	
Live shows	11	November 27, 2015	Friday, 8:30 PM	1	2,132	1,135	6.2	16.5	1	1,287	766	7.6	19.5	1	662	451	8.9	25.9	
Live shows	12	December 1, 2015	Tuesday, 8:30 PM	—N/a	—N/a	1,081	5.9	—N/a	—N/a	—N/a	788	7.8	—N/a	1	—N/a	520	10.3	—N/a	
Live shows	13	December 4, 2015	Friday, 8:30 PM	1	1,741	1,022	5.5	15.0	1	1,025	674	6.7	17.9	1	550	394	7.8	23.5	
Semi-final	14	December 11, 2015	Friday, 8:30 PM	1	1,778	1,258	6.8	15.2	1	1,113	866	8.6	19.1	1	612	491	9.8	26.0	
Final	15	December 18, 2015	Friday, 8:30 PM	1	2,100	1,539	8.3	19.5	1	1,296	1,013	10.0	23.4	1	722	581	11.5	30.0	
