= Vocea României season 6 =

Vocea României
- Season 6
- Hosted by: Pavel Bartoș; Lili Sandu (backstage)
- Judges: Smiley; Loredana Groza; Tudor Chirilă; Marius Moga
- Winner: Teodora Buciu
- Runner-up: Alexandru Mușat

Release
- Original network: Pro TV
- Original release: September 9 – December 16, 2016

Season chronology
- ← Previous; Season 5 Next → Season 7

The sixth season of the Romanian reality talent show Vocea României premiered on September 9, 2016 on ProTV. Smiley, Loredana Groza, Tudor Chirilă and Marius Moga have all returned as judges, and Pavel Bartoș, as the presenter of the show. Lili Sandu replaced Oana Tache as the social media correspondent.

The season finale aired on December 16, 2016. Teams Smiley and Moga had one finalist each, while Team Tudor had two. Both semi-finalists in Team Loredana had been eliminated. Teodora Buciu mentored by Tudor Chirilă, was declared winner of the season. It was Chirilă's third consecutive victory as a coach.

== Auditions ==
Cities where the pre-selections were held.

The open call auditions were held in the following locations: Pre-selections took place in the following cities:

Date	Audition venue	Location
March 6, 2016	Hotel Kronwell	Brașov
March 13, 2016	Hotel Continental	Timișoara
March 20, 2016	Hotel Unirea	Iași
March 27, 2016	Golden Tulip Ana Dome	Cluj-Napoca
April 9–10, 2016	Hotel Ibis Gara de Nord	Bucharest

== Teams ==
Color key

- Winner
- Runner-up
- Third place
- Fourth place
- Eliminated in the Live Shows
- Eliminated in the Knockout rounds
- Stolen in the Battle rounds
- Eliminated in the Battle rounds

Coaches	Top 56 artists					
Tudor Chirilă						
Tudor Chirilă	Teodora Buciu	Robert Botezan	Iuliana Dobre	Ioana Hrișcă	Rose Marie Velasquez	Dragoș Angel
Tudor Chirilă	Evelina Vîrlan	Francesca Ilie	Vlad Constantin	~~Șerban Radu~~	~~Miruna Ionescu~~	Vitalie Negruță
Tudor Chirilă	Adrian Corlaciu	Izabella Jakab-Péter	Camelia Crișan	Rodica Olișevschi		
Loredana Groza						
Loredana Groza	Ștefan Roșcovan	Andreea Ioncea	Howard Dell	Beatrice Apostu	Rucsandra Iliescu	Eduard Santha
Loredana Groza	Georgiana Agarici	Florin Popa	Adelina Borșan	~~Vlad Constantin~~	Alina Mocanu	Bogdan Negroiu
Loredana Groza	Bogdan Teohari	Ana Balmuș	Miruna Vizeteu	Monica Andrei		
Smiley						
Smiley	Alexandru Mușat	Ramona Nerra	Sebastian Seredinschi	Mihaela Chisnencu	Șerban Radu	Bárbara Isasi
Smiley	Miruna Ionescu	Ion Barbu	Maria-Eliza Avramescu	~~Rose Marie Velasquez~~	~~Astrid Petcu~~	~~Adelina Borșan~~
Smiley	~~Zinaida Cojocaru~~	Elena Munteanu	Maria Cătălina Adam	Mihai Olteanu		
Marius Moga						
Marius Moga	Ioana Ignat	Ionuț Trif	Alexandru Baroc	Andreea Olaru	Astrid Petcu	Zinaida Cojocaru
Marius Moga	Cătălina Godică	Ana Maria Roșu	Cezar Panaitescu	~~Florin Popa~~	Flavia Sandu	Victoria Peșterean
Marius Moga	Viorel Grecu	Lavinia Ștefan	Radu Iaszberenyi	Corina Coniuc		
Note: Italicized names are stolen contestants (names struck through within former teams).

== Blind auditions ==
Color key

✔	Coach hit his/her "I WANT YOU" button
	Artist defaulted to this coach's team
	Artist elected to join this coach's team
	Artist eliminated with no coach pressing his or her "I WANT YOU" button

=== Episode 1 (September 9) ===
The coaches performed "A Kind of Magic" at the start of the show.

Order	Artist	Age	Hometown	Song	Coach's and contestant's choices			
Order	Artist	Age	Hometown	Song	Tudor	Loredana	Smiley	Moga
1	Teodora Buciu	17	Bucharest	"Purple Rain"	✔	✔	✔	✔
2	Miruna Ionescu	23	Pitești, Argeș	"Who Knew"	✔	✔	—	—
3	Roman Burasanzve	24	Chișinău, Moldova	"I Got a Woman"	—	—	—	—
4	Corina Cuniuc	23	Paris, France	"Feeling Good"	✔	✔	✔	✔
5	Alina Mocanu	17	Focșani, Vrancea	"Masterpiece"	—	✔	—	—
6	Ionuț Trif	26	Căstău, Hunedoara	"Supergirl"	—	✔	✔	✔
7	Maria Magdalena Duțu	38	Brăila, Brăila	"E adevărat, iubirea mea"	—	—	—	—
8	Rucsandra Iliescu	24	Constanța, Constanța	"Bang Bang"	—	✔	—	—
9	Andrei Bănuță	17	Eforie, Constanța	"Fireflies"	—	—	—	—
10	Ramona Nerra	36	Düsseldorf, Germany	"Should've Been Us"	—	✔	✔	✔
11	Ana-Maria Cîrnu	18	Năvodari, Constanța	"Vama Veche"	—	—	—	—
12	Anda Mareș	19	Bucharest	"Mamma Knows Best"	—	—	—	—
13	Adrian Corlaciu	48	Sibiu, Sibiu	"Born to Be Wild"	✔	—	✔	✔

=== Episode 2 (September 11) ===
The second episode aired on September 11, 2016.

Order	Artist	Age	Hometown	Song	Coach's and contestant's choices			
Order	Artist	Age	Hometown	Song	Tudor	Loredana	Smiley	Moga
1	Howard Dell	54	Bucharest	"Get Here"	✔	✔	✔	✔
2	Denisa Lőte	20	Gherla, Cluj	"Me, Myself & I"	—	—	—	—
3	Adelina Borșan	37	Bucharest	"That Man"	—	✔	✔	—
4	Alexandru Baroc	24	Bucharest	"Hotline Bling"	—	—	✔	✔
5	Elena Munteanu	27	Bucharest	"Virtual Insanity"	✔	—	✔	—
6	Mădălina Mantu	45	Hannover, Germany	"New York, New York"	—	—	—	—
7	Camelia Crișan	19	Cluj-Napoca, Cluj	"Big Spender"	✔	—	✔	✔
8	Bogdan Negroiu	40	Bucharest	"Apa"	—	✔	✔	—
9	Ioana Ardelean	16	Popești, Bihor	"Ain't No Other Man"	—	—	—	—
10	Alexandru Moldoveanu	21	Constanța, Constanța	"Me and Mrs. Jones"	—	—	—	—
11	Flavia Sandu	18	Cluj-Napoca, Cluj	"When We Were Young"	—	—	—	✔
12	Levente Hamar	33	Purcăreni, Argeș	"Bring Me to Life"	—	—	—	—
13	Tatiana Turtureanu	25	Chișinău, Moldova	"Wrecking Ball"	—	—	—	—
14	Sebastian Seredinschi	21	Vălenii de Munte, Prahova	"Pillowtalk"	✔	✔	✔	✔

=== Episode 3 (September 16) ===
The third episode aired on September 16, 2016.

Order	Artist	Age	Hometown	Song	Coach's and contestant's choices			
Order	Artist	Age	Hometown	Song	Tudor	Loredana	Smiley	Moga
1	Astrid Petcu	20	Bucharest	"Sub pielea mea"	✔	✔	✔	—
2	Ioan Armean	26	Sibiu, Sibiu	"Brother"	—	—	—	—
3	Rose Marie Velasquez	28	Makati, Philippines	"Rise Up"	✔	✔	✔	✔
4	Ștefan Roșcovan	17	Chișinău, Moldova	"Hold On, We're Going Home"	—	✔	—	—
5	Andreea Ilie	21	Craiova, Dolj	"Be Without You"	—	—	—	—
6	Francesca Ilie	24	Craiova, Dolj	"My Kind of Love"	✔	—	—	—
7	Ioana Constantin	26	Bucharest	"Ain't Nobody (Loves Me Better)"	—	—	—	—
8	DJ Harra	33	Bucharest	"What's a Woman?"	—	—	—	—
9	Șerban Radu	17	Bucharest	"Home"	✔	—	✔	—
10	Rodica Olișevschi	24	Chișinău, Moldova	"Don't Worry, Be Happy"	✔	—	✔	—
11	Bogdan Teohari	23	Galați, Galați	"Dear Darlin'"	—	✔	—	—
12	Maxim Zavidia	27	Chișinău, Moldova	"Billie Jean"	—	—	—	—
13	Mihaela Agache	30	Galați, Galați	"I Will Never Let You Down"	—	—	—	—
14	Cătălina Godică	21	Galați, Galați	"Lay Me Down"	✔	✔	✔	✔

=== Episode 4 (September 23) ===
The fourth episode aired on September 23, 2016.

Order	Artist	Age	Hometown	Song	Coach's and contestant's choices			
Order	Artist	Age	Hometown	Song	Tudor	Loredana	Smiley	Moga
1	Alexandru Mușat	21	Bistrița, Bistrița-Năsăud	"Have You Ever Loved a Woman"	✔	✔	✔	✔
2	Beatrice Apostu	25	Bucharest	"Fighter"	✔	✔	—	—
3	Sanja Pavel	24	Skopje, North Macedonia	"Don't Let Me Down"	—	—	—	—
4	Monica Andrei	31	Bucharest	"Heartbeat Song"	—	✔	—	—
5	Zoran Demian	17	Timișoara, Timiș	"Bensonhurst Blues"	—	—	—	—
6	Evelina Vîrlan	22	Chișinău, Moldova	"Stay"	✔	✔	—	—
7	Eduard Antochi	42	Buzău, Buzău	"How You Remind Me"	—	—	—	—
8	Cezar Panaitescu	37	Bucharest	"Starlight"	—	—	✔	✔
9	Andreea Olaru	21	Botoșani, Botoșani	"You Know I'm No Good"	—	—	✔	✔
10	Mirela Bobe	28	Bolintin-Vale, Giurgiu	"Something's Got a Hold on Me"	—	—	—	—
11	Vitalie Negruță	29	Chișinău, Moldova	"How Am I Supposed to Live Without You"	✔	—	—	—
12	Ecaterina Lupșa	29	Bucharest	"Give Me One Reason"	—	—	—	—
13	Maria-Eliza Avramescu	26	Timișoara, Timiș	"Afterglow"	✔	✔	✔	✔

=== Episode 5 (September 30) ===
The fifth episode aired on September 30, 2016.

Order	Artist	Age	Hometown	Song	Coach's and contestant's choices			
Order	Artist	Age	Hometown	Song	Tudor	Loredana	Smiley	Moga
1	Ioana Alexandra Ignat	18	Botoșani, Botoșani	"Bird Set Free"	✔	✔	✔	✔
2	Eduard Santha	28	Bucharest	"Sexy and I Know It"	—	✔	—	—
3	Zinaida Cojocaru	18	Chișinău, Moldova	"Dream a Little Dream of Me"	✔	—	✔	—
4	Rareș Jucan	21	Satu Mare, Satu Mare	"Where Are Ü Now"	—	—	—	—
5	Loredana Ioniță-Dorobanțu	28	Bucharest	"Be the One"	—	—	—	—
6	Robert Botezan	19	Sibiu, Sibiu	"I'm Not the Only One"	✔	✔	✔	✔
7	Andreea Ioncea	26	Bucharest	"Changing"	—	✔	—	—
8	Daniel Câmpeanu	49	Roșiorii de Vede, Teleorman	"Le mal de toi"	—	—	—	—
9	Dragoș Anghel	27	Bucharest	"It's a Man's Man's Man's World"	✔	—	—	—
10	Iulia Stoica	22	Sibiu, Sibiu	"Runnin' (Lose It All)"	—	—	—	—
11	Aneea Opriș	25	Sibiu, Sibiu	"I Can't Stand the Rain"	—	—	—	—
12	Radu Iaszberenyi	35	Baia Mare, Maramureș	"Crazy"	—	—	—	✔
13	Bárbara Isasi	28	Bucharest	"Rather Be"	—	✔	✔	—

=== Episode 6 (October 7) ===
The sixth episode aired on October 7, 2016.

Order	Artist	Age	Hometown	Song	Coach's and contestant's choices			
Order	Artist	Age	Hometown	Song	Tudor	Loredana	Smiley	Moga
1	Iuliana Dobre	28	Câmpina, Prahova	"The Show Must Go On"	✔	—	✔	—
2	Mihai Olteanu	22	Bucharest	"Let Her Go"	—	—	✔	—
3	Ion Barbu	23	Chișinău, Moldova	"Say Something"	✔	✔	✔	✔
4	Alexandra Ilie	16	—	"Castle in the Snow"	—	—	—	—
5	Izabella Jakab-Péter	22	Brașov, Brașov	"Billionaire"	✔	—	—	—
6	Max Fall	23	Chișinău, Moldova	"Closer to the Edge"	—	—	—	—
7	Georgiana Agarici	19	Bucharest	"Soon We'll Be Found"	—	✔	—	✔
8	Cristian Scutaru	38	Bucharest	"It's Not That Easy"	—	—	—	—
9	Diana Căldăraru	17	Gura Humorului, Suceava	"I Wish"	—	—	—	—
10	Miruna Vizeteu	16	Bucharest	"Elastic Heart"	—	✔	—	—
11	Florin Popa	20	Sibiu, Sibiu	"Love Yourself"	✔	—	✔	✔
12	Ana Maria Roșu	20	Bucharest	"Who's Lovin' You"	✔	✔	✔	✔
13	Diana Francesca Filipescu	22	Năvodari, Constanța	"Sweet People"	—	—	—	—

=== Episode 7 (October 14) ===
The seventh and last blind audition episode aired on October 14, 2016.

Order	Artist	Age	Hometown	Song	Coach's and contestant's choices			
Order	Artist	Age	Hometown	Song	Tudor	Loredana	Smiley	Moga
1	Mihaela Ojog	23	Chișinău, Moldova	"Rhythm Inside"	—	—	—	—
2	Valeria Pașa	20	Chișinău, Moldova	"Stronger (What Doesn't Kill You)"	—	—	—	—
3	Vlad Constantin	28	Bucharest	"Whole Lotta Love"	—	✔	—	—
4	Lavinia Ștefan	41	Bucharest	"Un actor grăbit"	✔	✔	✔	✔
5	Mihaela Chisnencu	22	Bucharest	"What Is Love"	✔	—	✔	—
6	Danny Mazo	30	Bucharest	"El Perdón"	—	—	—	—
7	Ada Palade	27	Bucharest	"Piece of My Heart"	—	—	—	—
8	Viorel Grecu	22	Chișinău, Moldova	"Radioactive"	✔	✔	✔	✔
9	Victoria Peșterean	20	Chișinău, Moldova	"My Kind of Love"	✔	—	—	✔
10	Ioana Hrișcă	20	Suceava, Suceava	"Am I the One"	✔	—	✔	✔
11	Filip Lețu-Dragomir	18	Focșani, Vrancea	"Thinking Out Loud"	—	—	—	—
12	Antonia Stancu	19	Bucharest	"The Hills"	—	—	—	—
13	Ana Balmuș	28	Bucharest	"Crazy"	—	✔	—	—
14	Hunor Szabo	35	Sfântu Gheorghe, Covasna	"Easy"	—	—	—	—
15	Maria Cătălina Adam	22	Câmpina, Prahova	"If I Ain't Got You"	—	—	✔	—

== The Battles ==
After the Blind auditions, each coach had fourteen contestants for the Battle rounds. The Battles rounds started with episode 8 on October 21, 2016. Coaches began narrowing down the playing field by training the contestants. Each battle concluding with the respective coach eliminating one of the two contestants. Each coach could steal two losing contestant from another team, thus saving them from elimination.

Color key:

Artist won the Battle and advanced to the Knockouts
Artist lost the Battle but was stolen by another coach and advanced to the Knockouts
Artist lost the Battle and was eliminated

=== Episode 8 (21 October) ===
The eighth episode aired on October 21, 2016.

Coach	Order	Winner	Song	Loser	'Steal' result			
Coach	Order	Winner	Song	Loser	Tudor	Loredana	Smiley	Moga
Marius Moga	1	Ioana Ignat	"Take Me to Church"	Corina Cuniuc	—	—	—	—N/a
Smiley	2	Bárbara Isasi	"Like I'm Gonna Lose You"	Mihai Olteanu	—	—	—N/a	—
Tudor Chirilă	3	Iuliana Dobre	"Bad Girl"	Miruna Ionescu	—N/a	—	✔	✔
Marius Moga	4	Andreea Olaru	"Where the Wild Roses Grow"	Radu Iaszberenyi	—	—	—	—N/a
Tudor Chirilă	5	Ioana Hrișcă	"Single Ladies (Put a Ring on It)"	Rodica Olișevschi	—N/a	—	—	—
Loredana Groza	6	Rucsandra Iliescu	"Can't Stop the Feeling!"	Vlad Constantin	✔	—N/a	—	—
Loredana Groza	7	Howard Dell	"Somewhere Out There"	Monica Andrei	—	—N/a	—	—

=== Episode 9 (28 October) ===
The ninth episode aired on October 28, 2016.

Coach	Order	Winner	Song	Loser	'Steal' result			
Coach	Order	Winner	Song	Loser	Tudor	Loredana	Smiley	Moga
Marius Moga	1	Ionuț Trif	"The House of the Rising Sun"	Lavinia Ștefan	—	—	—	—N/a
Tudor Chirilă	2	Teodora Buciu	"Don't Rain on My Parade"	Camelia Crișan	—N/a	—	—	—
Smiley	3	Alexandru Mușat	"Lost on You"	Zinaida Cojocaru	✔	—	—N/a	✔
Loredana Groza	4	Ștefan Roșcovan	"Lângă inima mea, vine inima ta"	Miruna Vizeteu	—	—N/a	—	—
Marius Moga	5	Cezar Panaitescu	"7 Years"	Viorel Grecu	—	—	—	—N/a
Smiley	6	Maria-Eliza Avramescu	"Ain't No Mountain High Enough"	Adelina Borșan	—	✔	—N/a	—
Loredana Groza	7	Andreea Ioncea	"Alive"	Ana Balmuș	—	—N/a	—	—

=== Episode 10 (4 November) ===
The tenth episode aired on November 4, 2016.

Coach	Order	Winner	Song	Loser	'Steal' result			
Coach	Order	Winner	Song	Loser	Tudor	Loredana	Smiley	Moga
Tudor Chirilă	1	Robert Botezan	"Demons"	Izabella Jakab-Péter	—N/a	—	—	—
Loredana Groza	2	Georgiana Agarici	"Secret Love Song"	Bogdan Teohari	—	—N/a	—	—
Marius Moga	3	Alexandru Baroc	"Marvin Gaye"	Victoria Peșterean	—	—	—	—N/a
Smiley	4	Ramona Nerra	"Sledgehammer"	Astrid Petcu	—	✔	—N/a	✔
Tudor Chirilă	5	Francesca Ilie	"Bridge over Troubled Water"	Șerban Radu	—N/a		✔	✔
Marius Moga	6	Cătălina Godică	"Sweet Child o' Mine"	Flavia Sandu	—	—	—	—N/a
Smiley	7	Ion Barbu	"My Immortal"	Maria Cătălina Adam	—	—	—N/a	—

=== Episode 11 (11 November) ===
The eleventh episode aired on November 11, 2016.

Coach	Order	Winner	Song	Loser	'Steal' result			
Coach	Order	Winner	Song	Loser	Tudor	Loredana	Smiley	Moga
Smiley	1	Sebastian Seredinschi	"Red"	Elena Munteanu	—	—	—N/a	—
Loredana Groza	2	Eduard Santha	"Beggin'"	Bogdan Negroiu	—	—N/a	—	—
Tudor Chirilă	3	Evelina Vîrlan	"Maybe I'm Amazed"	Adrian Corlaciu	—N/a	—	—	—
Loredana Groza	4	Beatrice Apostu	"Can't Remember to Forget You"	Alina Mocanu	—	—N/a	—	—
Marius Moga	5	Ana Maria Roșu	"Smells Like Teen Spirit"	Florin Popa	—	✔	—	—N/a
Tudor Chirilă	6	Dragoș Anghel	"Roxanne"	Vitalie Negruță	—N/a	—	—	—
Smiley	7	Mihaela Chisnencu	"Sugar"	Rose Marie Velasquez	✔	—	—N/a	—

== Knockout rounds ==
The remaining nine artists from each team were split up into three groups of three. At the end of each knockout round the coach then decided out of the three artists who won, and therefore made up their three artists to take to the live shows.

Color key:

Artist won the Knockout and advanced to the Live shows
Artist lost the Knockout and was eliminated

=== Episode 12 (18 November) ===
The twelfth episode aired on November 18, 2016.

Coach	Order	Artist	Song	Result
Smiley	1	Maria-Eliza Avramescu	"Changing"	Eliminated
Smiley	1	Ion Barbu	"Boschetar"	Eliminated
Smiley	1	Ramona Nerra	"I Have Nothing"	Advanced
Tudor Chirilă	2	Robert Botezan	"With or Without You"	Advanced
Tudor Chirilă	2	Vlad Constantin	"Hamburg Song"	Eliminated
Tudor Chirilă	2	Francesca Ilie	"That's Life"	Eliminated
Loredana Groza	3	Ștefan Roșcovan	"Bad Girls"	Advanced
Loredana Groza	3	Adelina Borșan	"What's Love Got to Do with It"	Eliminated
Loredana Groza	3	Florin Popa	"The A Team"	Eliminated
Marius Moga	4	Ana Maria Roșu	"Chain of Fools"	Eliminated
Marius Moga	4	Cezar Panaitescu	"Viva la Vida"	Eliminated
Marius Moga	4	Ionuț Trif	"Wicked Game"	Advanced
Smiley	5	Alexandru Mușat	"I Wish"	Advanced
Smiley	5	Bárbara Isasi	"Solamente Tú"	Eliminated
Smiley	5	Miruna Ionescu	"Skyfall"	Eliminated
Loredana Groza	6	Georgiana Agarici	"Love on the Brain"	Eliminated
Loredana Groza	6	Eduard Santha	"Just a Gigolo"/"I Ain't Got Nobody"	Eliminated
Loredana Groza	6	Andreea Ioncea	"In the Name of Love"	Advanced

=== Episode 13 (25 November) ===
The thirteenth episode aired on November 25, 2016.

Coach	Order	Artist	Song	Result
Loredana Groza	1	Rucsandra Iliescu	"Alarm"	Eliminated
Loredana Groza	1	Howard Dell	"What's Going On"	Advanced
Loredana Groza	1	Beatrice Apostu	"Heavy on My Heart"	Eliminated
Tudor Chirilă	2	Teodora Buciu	"Bang Bang (My Baby Shot Me Down)"	Advanced
Tudor Chirilă	2	Evelina Vîrlan	"Zombie"	Eliminated
Tudor Chirilă	2	Dragoș Anghel	"Wings"	Eliminated
Marius Moga	3	Zinaida Cojocaru	"I Was Here"	Eliminated
Marius Moga	3	Ioana Ignat	"Stop!"	Advanced
Marius Moga	3	Cătălina Godică	"Foolish Games"	Eliminated
Smiley	4	Șerban Radu	"Candle in the Wind"	Eliminated
Smiley	4	Mihaela Chisnencu	"Clown"	Eliminated
Smiley	4	Sebastian Seredinschi	"Lay Me Down"	Advanced
Marius Moga	5	Andreea Olaru	"Can't Take My Eyes Off You"	Eliminated
Marius Moga	5	Astrid Petcu	"Fallin'"	Eliminated
Marius Moga	5	Alexandru Baroc	"Georgia on My Mind"	Advanced
Tudor Chirilă	6	Rose Marie Velasquez	"(I Can't Get No) Satisfaction"	Eliminated
Tudor Chirilă	6	Ioana Hrișcă	"Say You Love Me"	Eliminated
Tudor Chirilă	6	Iuliana Dobre	"All I Wanna Do Is Make Love to You"	Advanced

== Live shows ==
This year there will be three live shows.

Color key

Artist was saved by the public vote
Artist was chosen by their coach
Artist was eliminated

=== Week 1 - Top 12 (2 December) ===
All 12 remaining contestants competed in the first live show on Friday, December 2, 2016. The public vote could save one contestant from each team, the second one being chosen by the coach. The other contestant was eliminated.

Episode 14 (December 2)
Coach	Order	Artist	Song	Result
Smiley	1	Alexandru Mușat	"Tennessee Whiskey"	Public vote
Smiley	2	Ramona Nerra	"Respect"	Smiley's choice
Smiley	3	Sebastian Seredinschi	"Versace on the Floor"	Eliminated
Loredana Groza	4	Howard Dell	"Isn't She Lovely"	Eliminated
Loredana Groza	5	Andreea Ioncea	"Vision of Love"	Loredana's choice
Loredana Groza	6	Ștefan Roșcovan	"Incomplete"	Public vote
Tudor Chirilă	7	Teodora Buciu	"Lascia ch'io pianga"	Public vote
Tudor Chirilă	8	Robert Botezan	"The Sound of Silence"	Tudor's choice
Tudor Chirilă	9	Iuliana Dobre	"Help!"	Eliminated
Marius Moga	10	Alexandru Baroc	"You Are Not Alone"	Eliminated
Marius Moga	11	Ionuț Trif	"Numai una"	Moga's choice
Marius Moga	12	Ioana Ignat	"Je t'aime"	Public vote

Non-competition performances
Order	Performer	Song
1	Agurida, Mihai Mărgineanu and Loredana Groza	"Iac-așa! Ai ce trebuie!"

=== Week 2 - Semifinal (9 December ) ===
The semi-final aired on Friday, December 9, 2016, and featured four "crossed duels" consisting of pairings of contestants from different teams. Each contestant performed a single song. The outcome of each duel was decided by public vote only. With the elimination of Ioncea and Roșcovan, for the second consecutive times, Loredana no longer had any artist remaining on her team.

Episode 15 (December 9)
Coach	Duel	Artist	Song	Result
Smiley	1	Alexandru Mușat	"Yesterday"	Advanced
Marius Moga	1	Ionuț Trif	"Nothing Else Matters"	Eliminated
Marius Moga	2	Ioana Ignat	"Io vivrò (senza te)"	Advanced
Loredana Groza	2	Andreea Ioncea	"I'd Rather Go Blind"	Eliminated
Loredana Groza	3	Ștefan Roșcovan	"Tear in My Heart"	Eliminated
Tudor Chirilă	3	Robert Botezan	"Come Together"/"Cine iubește și lasă (Blestem)"	Advanced
Tudor Chirilă	4	Teodora Buciu	"Creep"	Advanced
Smiley	4	Ramona Nerra	"One More Try"	Eliminated

Non-competition performances
Order	Performer	Song
1	Vama	"Ghosts at War"
2	Smiley	"Confesiune"
3	Loredana Groza	"Ziua de azi"
4	Marius Moga and Robert Toma	"Cum trăiește lumea bună"

=== Final (Week 3) ===
The top 4 contestants performed in the grand final on Friday, December 16, 2016. This week, the four finalists performed a solo song, a duet with a special guest and a duet with their coach. The public vote determined the winner, and that resulted in a victory for Teodora Buciu, Tudor Chirilă's third consecutive victory as a coach.

Episode 16 (December 16)
Coach	Artist	Order	Solo Song	Order	Duet Song (with coach)	Order	Duet Song (with special guest)	Result
Tudor Chirilă	Teodora Buciu	1	"Cry Baby"	5	"Zmeul"	9	"Who Wants to Live Forever" with (Tiberiu Albu)	Winner
Marius Moga	Ioana Ignat	6	"My Heart Will Go On"/"Hymn to the Sea"	2	"With a Little Help from My Friends"	10	"Mamă, inima mi-i arsă"/"Cântec despre Bucovina" (with Grigore Leșe)	Fourth place
Tudor Chirilă	Robert Botezan	11	"I Will Always Love You"	7	"Vara asta..."	3	"Hallelujah" (with Ligia Hojda)	Third place
Smiley	Alexandru Mușat	8	"Still Got the Blues (For You)"	12	"Hoochie Coochie Man"	4	"Human" (with Feli Donose)	Runner-up

Non-competition performances
Order	Performer	Song
1	Antonio Fabrizi, Ivana Farc, Sergiu Ferat, Alex Florea, Maria Hojda, Aliona Munteanu and Cristina Stroe	Medley: "Colindul cerbului" "Florile dalbe" "Santa Tell Me" "Rudolph the Red-Nosed Reindeer" "Santa Claus Is Comin' to Town" "Babbo Natale sta arrivando in città"
2	Loredana Groza, Agurida, Skizzo Skillz and Damian Drăghici	Medley: "Of, inimioară" "BiniDiTăt" "Mama mea e florăreasă"
3	Teodora Buciu and Tudor Chirilă	"Zmeul" (winning reprise)

== Elimination chart ==
Color key
Artist info

- Artist from Team Tudor
- Artist from Team Loredana
- Artist from Team Smiley
- Artist from Team Moga

Result details

- Winner
- Runner-up
- Third place
- Fourth place
- Artist was saved by the public vote
- Artist was saved by their coach
- Artist was eliminated

=== Overall ===
#	Week 1	Week 2	Final
Teodora Buciu	Safe	Safe	Winner
Alexandru Mușat	Safe	Safe	Runner-up
Robert Botezan	Safe	Safe	3rd place
Ioana Ignat	Safe	Safe	4th place
Ramona Nerra	Safe	Eliminated	Eliminated (Week 2)
Ștefan Roșcovan	Safe	Eliminated	Eliminated (Week 2)
Andreea Ioncea	Safe	Eliminated	Eliminated (Week 2)
Ionuț Trif	Safe	Eliminated	Eliminated (Week 2)
Alexandru Baroc	Eliminated	Eliminated (Week 1)	
Iuliana Dobre	Eliminated	Eliminated (Week 1)	
Howard Dell	Eliminated	Eliminated (Week 1)	
Sebastian Seredinschi	Eliminated	Eliminated (Week 1)	
Reference(s)			

== Ratings ==
Episode		Original airdate	Timeslot (EET)	National					18–49			Source
Episode		Original airdate	Timeslot (EET)	Rank	Peak (in thousands)	Viewers (in thousands)	Rating (%)	Share (%)	Rank	Rating (%)	Share (%)	Source
1	"The Blind Auditions Premiere"	September 9, 2016	Friday, 20:30	1	2 100	1 605	8,9	21,5	1	10,7	32,9	
2	"The Blind Auditions, Part 2"	September 11, 2016	Sunday, 20:30	1	2 000	1 541	8,6	20,0	1	11,5	29,5	
3	"The Blind Auditions, Part 3"	September 16, 2016	Friday, 20:30	1	1 900	1 544	8,6	20,5	1	9,9	29,1	
4	"The Blind Auditions, Part 4"	September 23, 2016	Friday, 20:30	1	2 400	1 763	9,8	21,3	1	11,7	29,6	
5	"The Blind Auditions, Part 5"	September 30, 2016	Friday, 20:30	1	2 500	1 815	10,1	22,2	1	12,3	33,5	
6	"The Blind Auditions, Part 6"	October 7, 2016	Friday, 20:30	1	2 290	1 749	9,7	21,5	1	13,4	32,0	
7	"The Blind Auditions, Part 7"	October 14, 2016	Friday, 20:30	1	2 400	1 736	9,7	20,9	1	12,8	33,0	
8	"The Battles Premiere"	October 21, 2016	Friday, 20:30	1	2 000	1 461	8,1	19,7	1	10,7	28,3	
9	"The Battles, Part 2"	October 28, 2016	Friday, 20:30	1	1 900	1 554	8,7	19,4	1	12,4	32,6	
10	"The Battles, Part 3"	November 5, 2016	Friday, 20:30	1	1 800	1 369	7,6	17,4	1	10,2	28,2	
11	"The Battles, Part 4"	November 12, 2016	Friday, 20:30	3	1 900	1 289	7,2	15,0	1	9,5	22,8	
12	"The Knockouts Premiere"	November 18, 2016	Friday, 20:30	2	1 800	1 228	6,8	15,4	1	9,2	24,2	
13	"The Knockouts, Part 2"	November 26, 2016	Friday, 20:30	2	1 800	1 197	6,7	14,4	1	8,5	21,9	
14	"Live show 1 - Top 12"	December 2, 2016	Friday, 20:30	1	2 000	1 285	7,2	18,5	1	10,0	27,3	
15	"Live show 2 - Semifinal"	December 9, 2016	Friday, 20:30	2	—N/a	1 115	6,2	15,0	1	7,3	22,2	
16	"Live show 3 - Final"	December 16, 2016	Friday, 20:30	1	1 987	1 300	7,2	17,8	1	8,1	25,6	
