= Ducu Bertzi =

Romanian folk musician

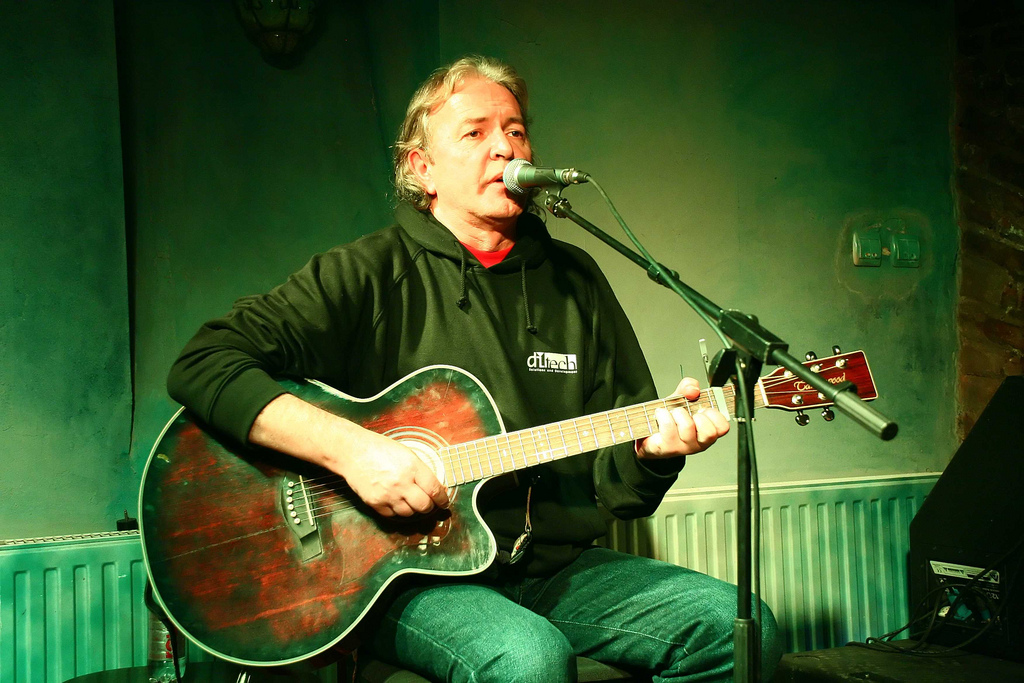

Background information
- Born: Ducu Bertzi; September 21, 1955 (age 70); Sighetu Marmației, Romania
- Genres: Folk
- Occupations: Singer, composer
- Instrument: Guitar
- Years active: 1976–present
- Website: ducubertzi.ro

Ducu Bertzi (Romanian pronunciation: [ˈduku ˈbert͡si]; born September 21, 1955, Sighetu Marmației) is a Romanian folk musician. His songs are usually his own compositions, but he also has in his repertoire some Romanian folk songs.

== Life ==
Until going to high school, he studied the violin for 8 years, and from the 9th grade he started the rock band "Mi bemol rock" with a couple of friends. With this band he would sing at high school serrates and ball-rooms Romanian songs and songs from the repertoire of other band that were in fashion at that time. In time, he renounced the electric guitar in favor of the acoustical one, due to lack of high quality technical equipment. The literature association from his hometown also inspired him to follow the paths of poetry. Later, at the first poetry and folk music festival at Sighet, in 1973, he won the Grand Prize.

In 1976 he became part of the folk stage of "Cenaclul Flacăra", and his first radio recording was made in 1979 for the song "Cînd s-o-mpărțit norocu'" ("When luck's shared").

Since then, he has always been present on the national and European music stages, the number of his concerts only until 1996 being greater than 3,200. Through his music, he tried to bring into the mainstream the poetry of not-so-well-known writers that he encountered and who impressed him, thus creating songs for their lyrics.

In parallel with his folk music career, he also revealed his talent on the theater stage, and in a choir, under the guidance of master Ioan Luchian Mihalea.

His best-known songs are "Și de-ar fi..." ("If it would be..."), "Floare de colț" ("Edelweiss"), "M-am îndrăgostit numai de ea" ("I fell in love with her only"), "Suflet fără chei" ("Keyless soul"), "Omul pădurii" ("Man of the woods").
