= Vama Veche (band) =

Romanian soft rock band

Vama Veche was a Romanian soft rock band, founded in 1996, the same year in which they recorded the song that would become a big hit in Romania the following year, "Nu am chef azi", with their first concert taking place on 28 November 1996 at Lăptaria lui Enache.

The third album released by the band was a concept album, suggesting that the group may turn towards progressive rock. The album was received with critical acclaim.

In 2006 the band split up.

== Members ==
- Tudor Chirilă
- Traian Bălănescu
- Liviu Mănescu
- Răzvan Lupu
- Eugen Caminschi
- Ionel Tanase

== Discography ==
- 1998 - Nu am chef azi
- 1999 - Vama Veche
- 2000 - Nu ne mai trageţi pe dreapta (maxi-single)
- 2002 - Am să mă întorc bărbat
- 2004 - Best of Vama Veche
- 2005 - Vama Veche Live
- 2006 - Fericire în rate
