= Loreen discography =

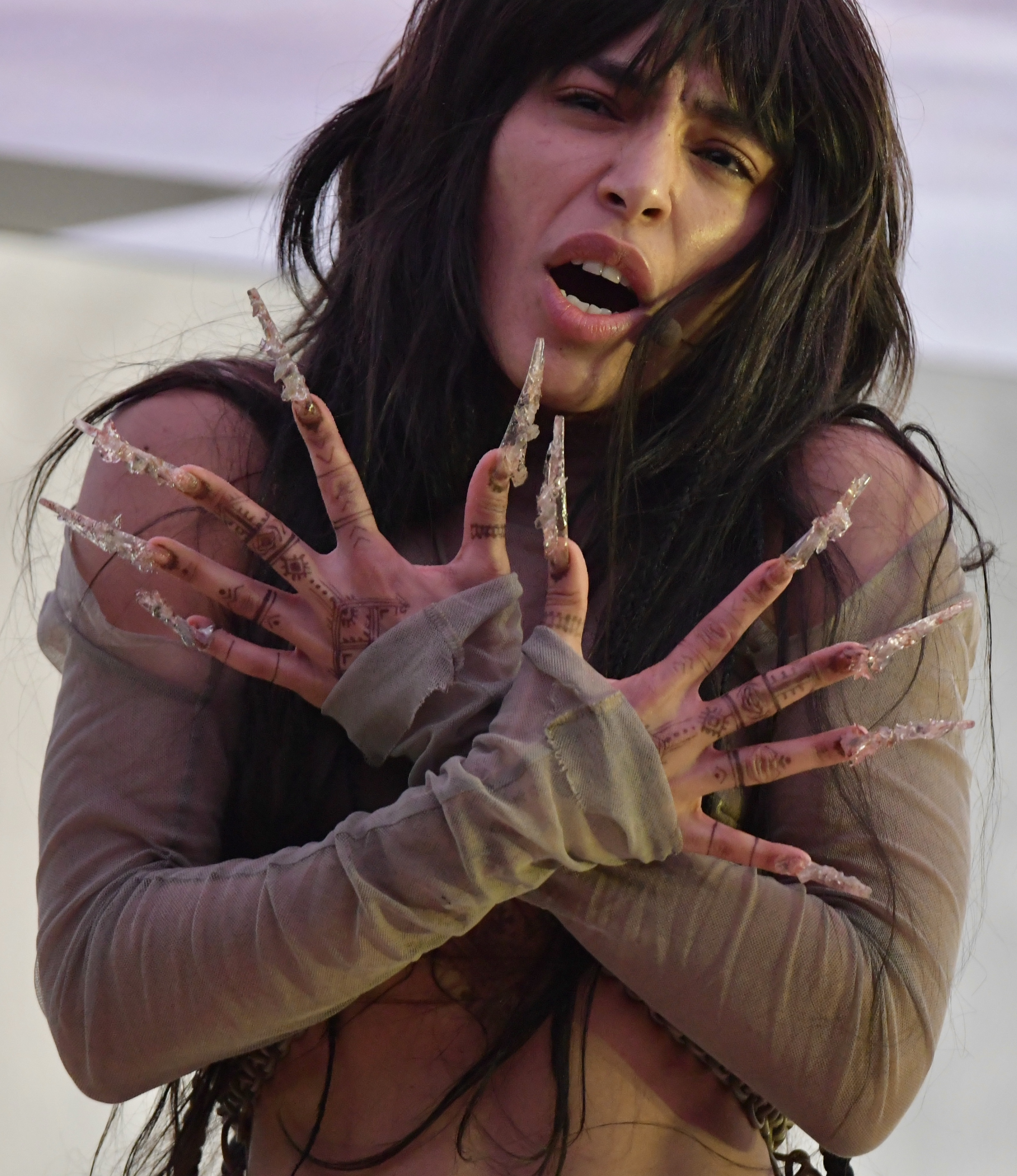
- Loreen performing at Melodifestivalen 2023
- Studio albums: 3
- EPs: 3
- Singles: 34
- Music videos: 12

Swedish singer-songwriter Loreen has released three studio albums, one compilation album, three extended plays (EPs), thirty-nine singles (including six as a featured artist), and six promotional singles. She first appeared as a featured artist on Freestyle's single "Vill ha dig" in 2004, following her appearance on Idol.

Loreen made her chart debut when she took part in Melodifestivalen 2011 with the song "My Heart Is Refusing Me", which she co-wrote with Moh Denebi and Björn Djupström. The single peaked at number nine on the Swedish singles chart. She followed this with the release of "Sober" which gave her a second top 30 hit in Sweden, charting at number twenty-six. Her major breakthrough occurred when she won the Eurovision Song Contest 2012 for Sweden with the song "Euphoria". The song charted at number one in seventeen countries, including her native Sweden, Germany, and Russia. Following the success of "Euphoria", Loreen reissued "My Heart Is Refusing Me" as her international second single. Her debut album, Heal followed in October 2012, under Warner Music Sweden.

Following several one-off releases in 2015, Loreen signed with BMG Scandinavia and released "Statements" in 2017, as part of Melodifestivalen 2017, which was followed by her first EP, Nude (2017). Shortly after, she released her second studio album, Ride on 24 November 2017. In 2020, Loreen signed with Universal Music Group, and later that year took part in the Swedish television show Så mycket bättre, where she performed three songs in Swedish, which were later released as singles. She released her first self-written Swedish song "Sötvattentårar" in 2021 and returned to English for her single "Neon Lights" in 2022. Loreen competed in Melodifestivalen 2023 with the song "Tattoo", which later won the competition and earned the right to represent Sweden in the Eurovision Song Contest 2023, where she won for a second time.

== Albums ==
=== Studio albums ===
List of studio albums, with selected chart positions, sales figures, and certifications
Title	Album details	Peak chart positions										Certifications
Title	Album details	SWE	AUT	BEL (FL)	DEN	FIN	GER	NL	NOR	SWI	UK	Certifications
Heal	Released: 22 October 2012; Label: Warner Music Sweden; Formats: CD, Digital download, streaming	1	26	21	12	6	16	16	6	7	71	GLF: Platinum
Ride	Released: 24 November 2017; Label: BMG Scandinavia; Formats: CD, digital download, streaming	31	—	—	—	—	—	—	—	—	—	
Wildfire	Released: 27 March 2026; Label: Human Creation, Polydor; Formats: CD, LP, digital download, streaming	— (Note: Wildfire did not enter the Swedish Albums Chart, but peaked at number 11 on the Swedish Physical Albums Chart.)	11	27	—	—	34	79	—	—	158	

=== Compilation albums ===
List of compilation albums
Title	Album details
Playlist	Released: 24 February 2023; Label: Warner Music Sweden; Formats: Digital download, streaming

== Extended plays ==
List of extended plays
Title	EP details
Nude	Released: 25 August 2017; Label: BMG Scandinavia; Formats: Digital download, streaming
Så mycket bättre (2020 – Tolkningarna)	Released: 19 December 2020; Label: Universal Music; Formats: Digital download, streaming
Sages (with Ólafur Arnalds)	Released: 21 March 2025; Label: Mercury KX; Formats: CD, digital download, streaming

== Singles ==
=== As main artist ===
List of singles as lead artist, with selected chart positions and certifications, showing album name and year released
Title	Year	Peak chart positions										Certifications	Album
Title	Year	SWE	AUT	BEL (FL)	GER	IRE	NLD	NOR	RUS Air.	SPA	UK	Certifications	Album
"My Heart Is Refusing Me"	2011	9	59	44	41	41	46	46	23	41	—	GLF: 2× Platinum	Heal
"Sober"	2011	26	—	—	—	—	—	—	—	—	—	GLF: Platinum	Heal
"Euphoria"	2012	1	1	1	1	1	2	2	4	2	3	GLF: 9× Platinum; BEA: Gold; BPI: Platinum; BVMI: Platinum; IFPI DEN: Platinum; PROMUSICAE: Platinum	Heal
"Crying Out Your Name"	2012	19	—	—	—	—	—	—	—	—	—		Heal
"In My Head"	2013	—	—	—	—	—	—	—	—	—	—		Heal
"We Got the Power"	2013	52	—	—	—	98	—	—	—	—	—	GLF: Gold	Heal
"Paper Light (Higher)"	2015	25	—	—	—	—	—	—	—	—	—		Non-album singles
"I'm In It With You"	2015	— (Note: "I'm in It with You" did not enter the Swedish Singles Chart (Sverigetopplistan), but peaked at number 2 on the Sweden Heatseeker Songs.)	—	—	—	—	—	—	—	—	—		Non-album singles
"Under ytan"	2015	—	—	—	—	—	—	—	—	—	—		Non-album singles
"Statements"	2017	13	—	—	—	—	—	—	—	—	—		Non-album singles
"Body"	2017	—	—	—	—	—	—	—	—	—	—		Nude
"Jungle" (with Elliphant)	2017	—	—	—	—	—	—	—	—	—	—		Nude
"'71 Charger"	2017	—	—	—	—	—	—	—	—	—	—		Ride
"Hate The Way I Love You"	2017	—	—	—	—	—	—	—	—	—	—		Ride
"Walk with Me"	2019	—	—	—	—	—	—	—	—	—	—		Non-album singles
"Sötvattentårar"	2021	— (Note: "Sötvattentårar" did not enter the Swedish Singellista Chart, but peaked at number 18 on the Swedish Heatseeker Chart.)	—	—	—	—	—	—	—	—	—		Non-album singles
"Neon Lights"	2022	—	—	—	—	—	—	—	—	—	—		Non-album singles
"Tattoo"	2023	1	1	1	7	3	1	1	6	22	2	GLF: 2× Platinum; BEA: 2× Platinum; BPI: Platinum; PROMUSICAE: 2x Platinum; SNEP: Diamond	Wildfire
"Is It Love"	2023	13	—	7	—	—	6	34	94	35	—	GLF: Gold; BEA: Gold; SNEP: Platinum	Wildfire
"Forever"	2024	60	—	—	—	—	—	—	—	—	—		Non-album singles
"Warning Signs"	2024	— (Note: "Warning Signs" did not enter the Swedish Singellista Chart, but peaked at number two on the Swedish Heatseeker Chart.)	—	—	—	—	—	—	3	—	—		Non-album singles
"Gravity"	2024	—	—	—	—	—	—	—	—	—	—		Non-album singles
"Echoes"	2025	—	—	—	—	—	—	—	—	—	—		Non-album singles
"Pum Pum" (with Dimitri Vegas and David Guetta)	2025	— (Note: "Pum Pum" did not enter the Swedish Singles Chart, but peaked at number 15 on the Swedish Heatseeker chart.)	—	22	—	—	—	—	39	—	—		Non-album singles
"Feels Like Heaven"	2026	—	—	—	—	—	—	—	—	—	—		Wildfire
"Wildfire"	2026	—	—	—	—	—	—	—	—	—	—		Wildfire
"Coming Close"	2026	—	—	—	—	—	—	—	—	—	—		Wildfire
"True Love" (solo or with Ólafur Arnalds)	2026	—	—	—	—	—	—	—	—	—	—		Wildfire
"Fire" (with A7S)	2026	—	—	—	—	—	—	—	—	—	—		Non-album single
"—" denotes items which were not released in that country or failed to chart.

=== As featured artist ===
Title	Year	Album
"Vill ha dig" (with Freestyle)	2004	Det bästa från Idol 2004 (Best from Idol 2004)
"The Snake" (with Rob'n'Raz)	2005	Non-album singles
"Into the Groove" (with Rigo)	2006	Non-album singles
"Requiem Solution" (Kleerup featuring Loreen)	2013	Non-album singles
"Son" (with Ingá-Máret Gaup-Juuso)	2014	Non-album singles
"Get Into It" (Boston Bun featuring Loreen)	2016	Non-album singles

=== Promotional singles ===
Title	Year	Peak chart positions	Album
Title	Year	SWE	Album
"Heal" (featuring Blanks)	2013	—	Heal
"Alice"	2020	96	Så mycket bättre 2020 – Tolkningarna
"Du är min man"	2020	72	Så mycket bättre 2020 – Tolkningarna
"Jag är en vampyr"	2020	43	Så mycket bättre 2020 – Tolkningarna
"Fiction Feels Good"	2020	—	Non-album singles
"Arcade" (Spotify Singles)	2025	—	Non-album singles
"Pour que tu m'aimes encore"	2026	—	Non-album singles
"—" denotes items which were not released in that country or failed to chart.

== Music videos ==
Title	Year	Director
"Euphoria"	2012	Marcus Söderlund
"Heal" (featuring Blanks)	2013	Robin Kempe-Bergman
"Requiem Solution" (with Kleerup)	2013	Charli Ljung / Sahara Widoff
"We Got the Power"	2013	Loreen
"My Heart Is Refusing Me"	2013	Liza Minou Morberg
"Paper Light Revisited"	2015	Charli Ljung
"I'm in It With You"	2015	Emma Hvengaard
"Nude"	2017	Charli Ljung
"'71 Charger"	2017	Johan Lindeberg
"'Hate the Way I Love You"	2017	Johan Lindeberg
"Ride"	2017	Johan Lindeberg
"Neon Lights"	2022	Charli Ljung
"Is It Love"	2023	Moncef Henaien
"SAGES"	2025	Thora Hilmarsdottir
"Feels Like Heaven"	2026	Neels Castillon
"Coming Close"	2026	Charli Ljung
"True Love"	2026	Neels Castillon

== Other appearances ==
Title	Artist	Year	Album
"Tapper Soldat"	Fronda	2005	Livet genom en pansarvagnspipa
"Daglig Basis Del 2"	AFC featuring Mackan	2006	Varje Dag E Löning
"Glömmer Aldrig"	Astma & Rocwell	2006	From DLX With Love
"Lyckliga gatan"	Governor Andy	2007	Underhållningsmaskinen
"Fire Blue"	Duvchi	2015	With the World
"Falling"	Worakls	2025	From One Blink to Another
"I Am What I Am"	Sofiane Pamart	2026	Movie
