= En Euforisk Jul =

- Residency by Loreen
- Location: Malmö, Sweden
- Venue: Moriska Paviljongen
- Start date: November 26, 2014
- End date: December 20, 2014
- No. of shows: 16
- Box office: $372.000 (est)

Loreen concert chronology
- Tour XIV (2014); En Euforisk Jul (2014)

En Euforisk Jul (English: A Euphoric Christmas) was the first concert residency by Swedish singer Loreen. A Christmas-themed show, it was performed at the Moriska Paviljongen in Malmö, Sweden from November 26, 2014 to December 20, 2014.

== Background ==
"We make a show that is locally produced. First, it is a show that fits with our house, one that crosses borders and has the magic and mystery that exist here, and we have with us the artist who took the Eurovision Song Contest here last year."

— Niklas Helsingius,

Loreen Talhaoui had been in the United States, but Niklas Helsingius said that the singer thought the idea behind the show was interesting and exciting and therefore accepted it. There were 16 opportunities to see Euphoric Christmas at Moriskan. The residency's name references Loreen's Eurovision Song Contest 2012 winning entry, "Euphoria".

== Set list ==
The following set list is representative of the show's opening night on November 26, 2014.

1. "Ave Maria"
2. "No Woman, No Cry" (contains excerpts from "We Got the Power")
3. "We Got the Power"
4. "Silent Night" (Interlude)
5. "Have Yourself a Merry Little Christmas"
6. "Everytime"
7. "My Heart is Refusing Me"
8. "Do We Even Matter"
9. "Euphoria"

== Shows ==
Date	Attendance	Revenue
Leg 1
November 26, 2014^{[A]}	7,200 / 7,200	$254,393
November 27, 2014^{[A]}	7,200 / 7,200	$254,393
November 28, 2014^{[A]}	7,200 / 7,200	$254,393
December 3, 2014^{[A]}	7,200 / 7,200	$254,393
December 4, 2014^{[A]}	7,200 / 7,200	$254,393
December 5, 2014	7,200 / 7,200	$254,393
December 6, 2014^{[A]}	7,200 / 7,200	$254,393
December 9, 2014	7,200 / 7,200	$254,393
December 10, 2014	7,200 / 7,200	$254,393
December 11, 2014	7,200 / 7,200	$254,393
December 12, 2014^{[A]}	7,200 / 7,200	$254,393
December 13, 2014	7,200 / 7,200	$254,393
Leg 2
December 17, 2014^{[A]}	2,400 / 2,400	$118,141
December 18, 2014	2,400 / 2,400	$118,141
December 19, 2014	2,400 / 2,400	$118,141
December 20, 2014	2,400 / 2,400	$118,141
TOTAL	9,600 / 9,600 (100%)	$372,534

Other miscellaneous performances
^{A} For companies and organisations only
