= List of Loreen concert appearances =

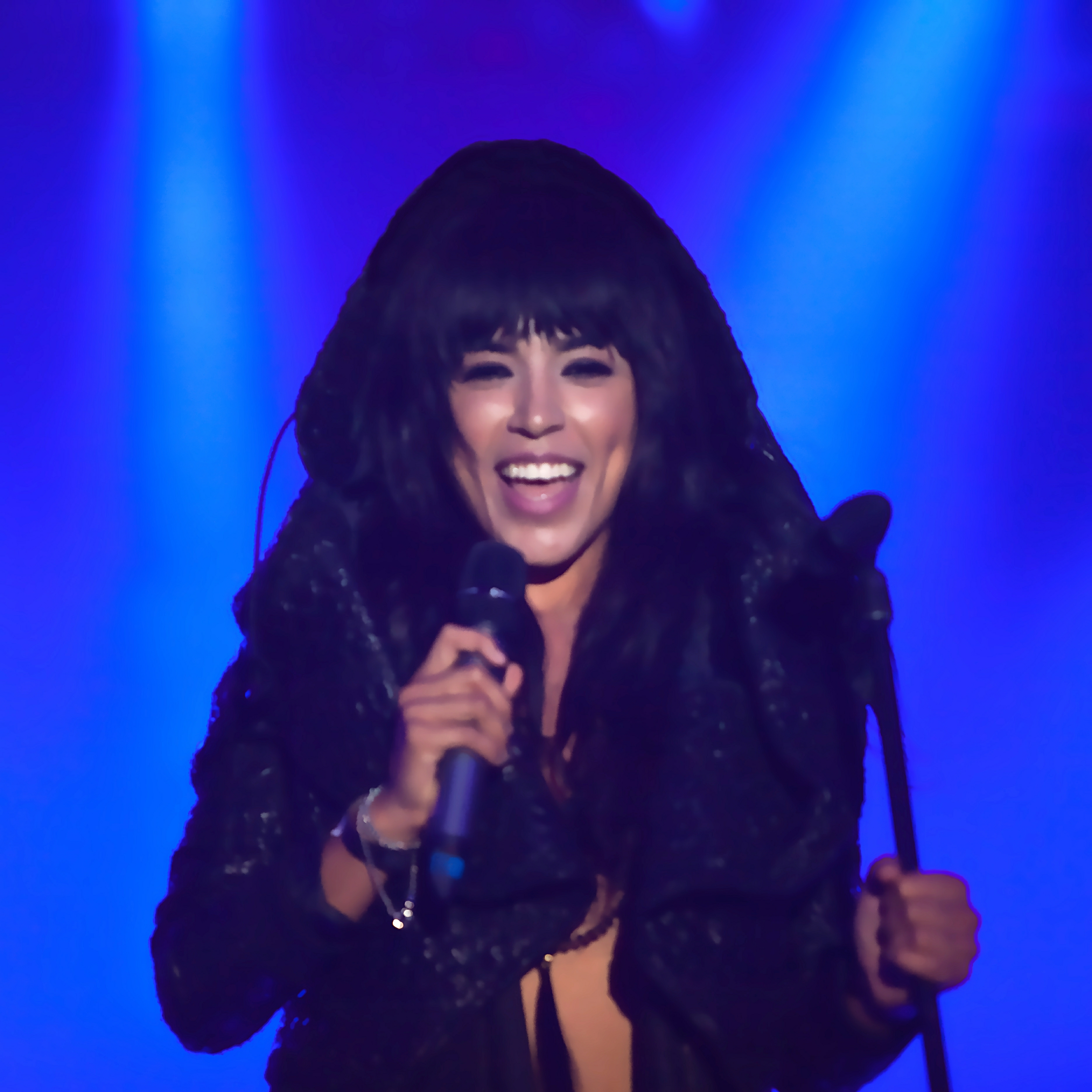
Loreen at Stockholm Pride 2012.

This is a list of concert appearances, at multi-artist events and in solo shows, by Swedish singer Loreen. She went on tour starting in 2012 to promote her first studio album Heal.

Her concert appearances have included shows that were part of "Art on Ice" in 2014, as well as a solo concert tour called "Tour XIV", also in 2014.

In 2023, following her second Eurovision win, she embarked on the Tattoo Tour around Europe.

A festival tour was announced for 2024 followed by an announcement for another UK and Europe tour in 2025.

== Promotional tour dates ==
Date	City	Country	Venue	Event
Promotional Tour
Europe
September 12, 2012	Helsinki	Finland	Hartwall Arena	Elämä Lapselle
September 15, 2012	Baden-Baden	Germany	Theater Baden-Baden	SWR New Pop Festival
September 20, 2012	Berlin	Germany	ProSieben Studios	Popstars 2012 Finale
September 22, 2012	Mölnlycke	Sweden	Råda	Symphony with Stars
September 24, 2012	Copenhagen	Denmark	Tivoli Gardens	The Voice 12
October 12, 2012	Stockholm	Sweden	Annexet	X Factor Sverige
October 21, 2012	Warsaw	Poland	Polsat Studios	Must Be the Music
October 26, 2012	Helsinki	Finland	MTV3 Studios	Heikki & Mikko Show
October 27, 2012	Stockholm	Sweden	Friends Arena	Opening Ceremony Friends Arena
October 28, 2012	Amsterdam	Netherlands	VTM Studios	So You Think You Can Dance
November 15, 2012	Madrid	Spain	Teatro Kapital	Los Premios 40 Principales
November 18, 2012	Bucharest	Romania	Antena 1 Studios	X Factor Romania
November 23, 2012	Zürich	Switzerland	Hallenstadion	Energy Stars for Free
November 29, 2012	Oslo	Norway	Sentrum Scene	Senkveld
December 2, 2012	Munich	Germany	ZDF Studios	Menschen 2012
December 3, 2012	Brussels	Belgium	The Qube	Q-music
December 14, 2012	Hilversum	Netherlands	Studio 24	The Voice of Holland 3
December 22, 2012	Amsterdam	Netherlands	Ziggo Dome	Radio 538 Jingle Bell
December 23, 2012	Hilversum	Netherlands	RTL Studios	Life 4 You
December 25, 2012	Berlin	Germany	Velodrom	Helene Fischer Show
Asia
December TBC, 2012	Beijing	China	Beijing National Indoor Stadium	HBTV Global Revelry 2013
Europe
December 31, 2012	Berlin	Germany	Brandenburg Gate	Willkommen 2013
January 19, 2013	Gothenburg	Sweden	Scandinavium	P3 Guld Award Ceremony
January 31, 2013	Madrid	Spain	Sala La Riviera	Fiesta Deezer
February 9, 2013	Oslo	Norway	Oslo Spektrum	Melodi Grand Prix 2013
February 14, 2013	Hanover	Germany	TUI Arena	Unser Song für Malmö
February 20, 2013	Stockholm	Sweden	Cirkus	Grammis
Asia
February 22, 2013	Tokyo	Japan	Galleria of Tokyo Midtown	Billboard Live Tokyo
February 25, 2013	Osaka	Japan	Herbis Plaza Ent	Billboard Live Osaka
Australia
March 2, 2013	Sydney	Australia	Moore Park	Sydney Mardi Gras 2013
Europe
March 9, 2013	Stockholm	Sweden	Friends Arena	Melodifestivalen 2013 Final
March 16, 2013	Luleå	Sweden	Kulturens Hus	Minus 30 Grader
March 23, 2013	Madrid	Spain	Palacio de los Deportes	La Noche de Cadena 100
April 7, 2013	Barcelona	Spain	Palau Sant Jordi	Festival de Música 13
April 12, 2013	Moscow	Russia	Soho Room	—N/a
~~April 20, 2013~~	~~Lidköping~~	Sweden	~~Swedbank Arena~~	~~Lidköping Festivalen 2013~~
April 26, 2013	Örebro	Sweden	Frimurareholmen	Campus 48h
May 18, 2013	Malmö	Sweden	Amiralen	Wonk Eurovision 2013
May 25, 2013	Cluj-Napoca	Romania	Piața Unirii	Days of Cluj-Napoca
Africa
May 31, 2013	Rabat	Morocco	OLM Souissi	Mawazine Festival
Europe
June 7, 2013	Skive	Denmark	Plænen	Skive Festival Tivoli
June 14, 2013	Chișinău	Moldova	Drive Club	Days of Chisinau
June 15, 2013	Kaarina	Finland	Kuusistosalmen	Saaristo Open Air
June 21, 2013	Oslo	Norway	Rådhusplassen	VG-lista 2013 Festival
June 22, 2013	Warsaw	Poland	Podzamcze	Wianki nad Wisłą 2013
June 23, 2013	Pühajärve	Estonia	Otepää Pühajärve	Pühajärve Jaanituli 2013
June 28, 2013	Skellefteå	Sweden	Skellefteå Centrum	Stadsfesten
Asia
July 6, 2013	Beirut	Lebanon	New Waterfront	NRJ Music Tour 2013
Europe
~~July 12, 2013~~	~~Riga~~	~~Latvia~~	~~Mežaparks Grand Stage~~	~~Festival Pestivals 2013~~
July 13, 2013	Moscow	Russia	Luzhniki Stadium	Europa Plus Live
July 19, 2013	Limassol	Cyprus	Dolce Club	—N/a
July 27, 2013	Stockholm	Sweden	Gröna Lund	Sommarkrysset Gröna Lund
August 9, 2013	Odesa	Ukraine	Club Niki Beach	—N/a
August 10, 2013	Antwerp	Belgium	Waagnatie	Antwerpen Pride
August 17, 2013	Malmö	Sweden	Stortorget	Rix FM Festival
August 18, 2013	Gothenburg	Sweden	Ringön	Rix FM Festival
August 23, 2013	Sopot	Poland	Forest Opera	Sopot International Song Festival
Europe
August 24, 2013	Gävle	Sweden	Furuviksparken	—N/a
September 6, 2013	Helsinki	Finland	Hotel Presidentti	—N/a
September 12, 2013	Stockholm	Sweden	Gröna Lund	—N/a
September 13, 2013	Voronezh	Russia	Zavod Club	—N/a
September 28, 2013	Moscow	Russia	Icon Club	—N/a
November 30, 2013	Kyiv	Ukraine	Gulliver Shopping Mall	The festive opening
December 13, 2013	Gothenburg	Sweden	Gustav Adolfs torg	Musikhjälpen 2013
Europe – Art on Ice Tour
February 27, 2014	Zurich	Switzerland	Hallenstadion	Art On Ice Tour 2014
February 28, 2014	Zurich	Switzerland	Hallenstadion	Art On Ice Tour 2014
March 1, 2014	Zurich	Switzerland	Hallenstadion	Art On Ice Tour 2014
March 2, 2014	Zurich	Switzerland	Hallenstadion	Art On Ice Tour 2014
March 4, 2014	Lausanne	Switzerland	Patinoire de Malley	Art On Ice Tour 2014
March 5, 2014	Lausanne	Switzerland	Patinoire de Malley	Art On Ice Tour 2014
March 7, 2014	Davos	Switzerland	Vaillant Arena	Art On Ice Tour 2014
March 8, 2014	Davos	Switzerland	Vaillant Arena	Art On Ice Tour 2014
March 11, 2014	Helsinki	Finland	Hartwall Arena	Art On Ice Tour 2014
March 13, 2014	Stockholm	Sweden	Ericsson Globe Arena	Art On Ice Tour 2014
April 4, 2014	Minsk	Belarus	Dozari Club	—N/a
Ride Tour
June 14, 2018	Stockholm	Sweden	Vinterträdgården	—N/a
June 15, 2018	Stockholm	Sweden	Mosebacke Terrassen	—N/a
June 30, 2018	Helsingborg	Sweden	—N/a	Mat & Sommar
July 28, 2018	Östersund	Sweden	—N/a	Storsjöyran
August 3, 2018	Eskilstuna	Sweden	—N/a	Eskilstuna Parkfestival
August 10, 2018	Norrköping	Sweden	—N/a	NRJ in the Park
August 12, 2018	Stockholm	Sweden	—N/a	Let's Make Love Great Again
August 15, 2018	Gothenburg	Sweden	—N/a	Europride 2018
August 18, 2018	Dalarö	Sweden	Smadalarö Gård	—N/a
August 31, 2018	Gothenburg	Sweden	—N/a	Statement Festival
September 28, 2018	Västerås	Sweden	Västerås Konserthus	—N/a
September 29, 2018	Örebro	Sweden	Örebro Concert Hall	—N/a
2024 Festival Tour
May 23, 2024	Jelling	Denmark	—N/a	Jelling Music Festival
May 26, 2024	Birmingham	England	Smithfield Live	Birmingham Pride
May 30, 2024	Stockholm	Sweden	Gröna Lund	Gröna Lund Live
June 7, 2024	Trondheim	Norway	E.C. Dahls Arena	Neon Festival
June 8, 2024	Vaulen	Norway	Vaulen Beach	Vaulen Open Air 2024
June 22, 2024	Newport	England	Seaclose Park	Isle of Wight Festival 2024
June 23, 2024	Landgraaf	Netherlands	—N/a	Pinkpop Festival
June 27, 2024	Stirling	Scotland	Stirling City Park	Stirling Summer Sessions
June 28, 2024	Furuvik	Sweden	Furuvik Zoo	Furuvik Live
June 29, 2024	Odense	Denmark	Fyen's Race Track	Tinderbox Festival
July 5, 2024	Bucharest	Romania	Romaero Airport	SAGA Festival
July 18, 2024	Montreux	Switzerland	Montreux Casino	Montreux Jazz Festival
July 19, 2024 (Note: Guest appearance with Topic headlining.)	Weeze	Germany	Weeze Airport	Parookaville 2024
July 20, 2024	Nieuwpoort	Belgium	—N/a	Beach Festival Nieuwpoort
July 26, 2024	Östersund	Sweden	—N/a	Storsjöyran Festival
August 17, 2024	Stradbally	Ireland	Stradbally Hall	Electric Picnic
August 24, 2024	Manchester	England	—N/a	Manchester Pride
August 27, 2024	Chișinău	Moldova	—N/a	Moldova's Independence Day
August 29, 2024	Gothenburg	Sweden	—N/a	Gothenburg's Culture Festival 2024
September 8, 2024	Munich	Germany	Olympic Park	Superbloom Festival
2026 Promotional Tour
February 20, 2026	Paris	France	The Yoyo - Palais de Tokyo	Bitch Party
March 28, 2026	Madrid	Spain	Movistar Arena	La Noche De Cadena 100
April 30, 2026	Compiègne	France	Château de Compiègne	NRJ Music Tour
~~August 28, 2026~~	~~Mo i Rana~~	~~Norway~~	—N/a	~~Verket Festival 2026~~
~~August 29, 2026~~	~~Narvik~~	~~Norway~~	—N/a	~~Haikjeften in Narvik~~
~~September 4, 2026~~	~~Lillehammer~~	~~Norway~~	~~Stampesletta~~	~~Lillehammer Live~~
~~September 5, 2026~~	~~Sarpsborg~~	~~Norway~~	—N/a	~~Sarpsborg Festival 2026~~

== Tour XIV ==
Date	City	Country	Venue
Tour XIV
April 8, 2014	Amsterdam	Netherlands	Melkweg
April 9, 2014	Cologne	Germany	Die Werksatt
April 11, 2014	Berlin	Germany	Postbahnhof am Ostbahnhof
April 12, 2014	Hamburg	Germany	Knust
April 13, 2014	Prague	Czech Republic	Club Roxy
April 15, 2014	Zurich	Switzerland	Mascotte Club
April 16, 2014	Munich	Germany	Muffatwerk
April 17, 2014	Vienna	Austria	Chaya Fuera

=== Set list ===
1. "We Got The Power"
2. "Crying Out Your Name"
3. "In My Head"
4. "Jupiter Drive"
5. "Sidewalk"
6. "Everytime"
7. "My Heart Is Refusing Me"
8. "Dumpster" (Note: Currently unreleased)
9. "Euphoria"

== Summer Tour 2021 ==
Date	City	Country	Venue
Swedish Summer Tour
July 16, 2021	Sundsvall	Sweden	Stadhusparken
July 21, 2021	Gotland	Sweden	Lilla Trägårn
July 23, 2021	Örebro	Sweden	Kackelstugan
July 24, 2021	Borgholm	Sweden	Stadsträdgården
July 23, 2021	Göteborg	Sweden	Villa Belparc
July 31, 2021	Mariehamn	Finland	Rockoff
August 7, 2021	Skellefteå	Sweden	Stadsparken
August 12, 2021	Båstad	Sweden	Summer Evening
August 14, 2021	Östersund	Sweden	Park Summer
August 20, 2021	Jättendal	Sweden	Mellanfjärdens Teater
August 21, 2021	Västerås	Sweden	Rhapsody in Rock
August 21, 2021	Domsjö	Sweden	Bruksgården

=== Set list ===
1. "Body"
2. "Alice"
3. "Jag är en vampyr"
4. "Du är min man"
5. "Sötvattentårar"
6. "Paper Light"
7. "'71 Charger"
8. "Jupiter Drive"
9. "Dreams"
10. "Heart On Hold"
11. "My Heart Is Refusing Me"
12. "Euphoria"

== Tattoo Tour 2023 ==
Date	City	Country	Venue
The Tattoo Tour
November 7, 2023	Dublin	Ireland	The Academy (Note: Original venue was Opium Rooms)
November 8, 2023	Glasgow	Scotland	SWG3 Glasgow (Note: Original venue was St. Luke's & The Winged Ox)
November 10, 2023	London	England	Electric Brixton
November 12, 2023	Amsterdam	Netherlands	Paradiso
November 14, 2023	Antwerp	Belgium	Trix
November 15, 2023	Berlin	Germany	Metropol
November 16, 2023	Warsaw	Poland	Klub Stodoła
November 17, 2023	Hamburg	Germany	Docks
November 19, 2023	Oslo	Norway	Rockefeller Music Hall
November 20, 2023	Copenhagen	Denmark	Vega
November 23, 2023	Stockholm	Sweden	Cirkus Arena
November 26, 2023	Helsinki	Finland	Vanha ylioppilastalo
~~November 27, 2023~~	~~Tampere~~	Finland	~~Pakkahuone~~
November 29, 2023	Tallinn	Estonia	Noblessner Foundry
November 30, 2023	Riga	Latvia	Palladium
December 1, 2023	Kaunas	Lithuania	Kauno Arena
December 4, 2023	Zürich	Switzerland	X-TRA
December 5, 2023	Paris	France	Alhambra

=== Set list ===
The following set list is representative of the show on November 7, 2023.

1. "In My Head"
2. "Crying Out Your Name"
3. "Is It Love"
4. "Batwanes Beek"
5. "Jupiter Drive"
6. "Ride"
7. "Dreams"
8. "My Heart Is Refusing Me"
9. "Body"
10. "Euphoria"
11. "Paper Light Revisited"
12. "Neon Lights"
13. "Tattoo"
14. "Is It Love (reprise)"
15. "Statements"

== Tour Life 2025 ==
Date	City	Country	Venue	Event
UK/Europe Headlining
February 15, 2025	Utrecht	Netherlands	TivoliVredenburg	—N/a
February 16, 2025	Oberhausen	Germany	Turbinenhalle Oberhausen	—N/a
February 18, 2025	Copenhagen	Denmark	Koncerthuset, Studio 2 (Note: Original venue was Poolen)	—N/a
February 19, 2025	Oslo	Norway	Sentrum Scene	—N/a
February 20, 2025	Stockholm	Sweden	Fållan (Note: Original venue was Annexet)	—N/a
February 22, 2025	Vilnius	Lithuania	Twinsbet Arena	—N/a
February 23, 2025	Warsaw	Poland	Stodoła	—N/a
February 24, 2025	Krakow	Poland	Klub Studio	—N/a
February 25, 2025	Berlin	Germany	Huxley's Neue Welt	—N/a
February 27, 2025	Prague	Czech Republic	Roxy Prague	—N/a
February 28, 2025	Vienna	Austria	Raiffeisen Halle Gasometer	—N/a
March 2, 2025	Budapest	Hungary	Akvarium Klub	—N/a
March 4, 2025	Munich	Germany	Muffathalle	—N/a
March 5, 2025	Brussels	Belgium	Ancienne Belgique	—N/a
March 6, 2025	Paris	France	Olympia	—N/a
March 8, 2025	Barcelona	Spain	Paral·lel 62	—N/a
March 9, 2025	Madrid	Spain	La Riviera	—N/a
March 11, 2025	Zurich	Switzerland	X-Tra	—N/a
March 12, 2025	Milan	Italy	Fabrique	—N/a
March 14, 2025	Lyon	France	Transbordeur	—N/a
March 15, 2025	Luxembourg	Luxembourg	Den Atelier	—N/a
March 17, 2025	Birmingham	England	O2 Institute	—N/a
March 19, 2025	London	England	Eventim Apollo	—N/a
March 21, 2025	Liverpool	England	O2 Academy Liverpool	—N/a
March 22, 2025	Manchester	England	Manchester Academy	—N/a
March 23, 2025	Bristol	England	O2 Academy Bristol	—N/a
March 25, 2025	Glasgow	Scotland	O2 Academy Glasgow	—N/a
March 27, 2025	Dublin	Ireland	Olympia	—N/a
March 28, 2025	Belfast	Northern Ireland	Ulster Hall	—N/a
Festivals
April 18, 2025	Schijndel	Netherlands	—N/a	Paaspop Festival
May 17, 2025	Seoul	South Korea	—N/a	Superpop Festival
May 24, 2025	Umag	Croatia	—N/a	Sea Star Festival
May 30, 2025	Warsaw	Poland	—N/a	Orange Warsaw Festival 2025
May 31, 2025	Borås	Sweden	—N/a	Bruket
June 1, 2025	London	England	—N/a	Mighty Hoopla
June 28, 2025	Cologne	Germany	—N/a	Rainbow Festival
~~July 12, 2025~~	~~Petrovaradin~~	~~Serbia~~	—N/a	~~Exit Festival 2025~~
July 18, 2025	Athens	Greece	—N/a	Release Athens
~~July 27, 2025~~	~~Amsterdam~~	~~Netherlands~~	—N/a	~~Milkshake Festival~~
August 2, 2025	Brighton	England	—N/a	Brighton and Hove Pride
August 3, 2025	Sitges	Spain	—N/a	Festival Terramar CaixaBank
August 14, 2025	Tréflez	France	—N/a	Festival La Nuit des Étoiles
August 16, 2025	Poznań	Poland	—N/a	BitterSweet Festival
August 17, 2025	Hasselt	Belgium	—N/a	Pukkelpop
September 13, 2025	Bucharest	Romania	—N/a	Unforgettable Festival
October 11, 2025	Limassol	Cyprus	—N/a	Etko

=== Set list ===
The following set list is representative of the show on February 15, 2025. It is not representative of all concerts for the duration of the tour.

1. "Jupiter Drive"
2. "Gravity"
3. "Forever"
4. "Warning Signs"
5. "Hate The Way I Love You"
6. "Statements"
7. "Dreams"
8. "I'm In It With You"
9. "My Heart Is Refusing Me"
10. "Ocean Away"
11. "Coming Close"
12. "Euphoria"
13. "Is It Love"
14. "Tattoo"
15. "Fire Blue"

During the festival portion of the tour, the setlist varied depending on her allotted time.

==== VIP soundcheck songs ====
Additionally, Loreen performed two songs as part of the VIP soundcheck package at her headlining shows. She performed the following songs:

- Utrecht: "Hate The Way I Love You" and "My Heart Is Refusing Me"
- Oberhausen: "Is It Love" and "My Heart Is Refusing Me"
- Copenhagen: "Everytime" and "I'm In It With You"
- Oslo: "Paper Light" and "Euphoria"
- Stockholm: "Ocean Away" and "Is It Love"
- Vilnius: "Body" and "Euphoria"
- Warsaw: "Ocean Away" and "Paper Light"
- Kraków: "Ocean Away" and "Ride"
- Berlin: "Ocean Away" and "My Heart Is Refusing Me"
- Prague: "Ocean Away" and "My Heart Is Refusing Me"
- Vienna: "Ride" and "Is It Love"
- Budapest: "Everytime" and "Is It Love"
- Munich: "Ocean Away" and "Ride"
- Brussels: "Ocean Away" and "My Heart Is Refusing Me"
- Paris: "Ride" and "My Heart Is Refusing Me"
- Barcelona: "Ocean Away" and "Is It Love"
- Madrid: "My Heart Is Refusing Me" and "Body"
- Zurich: "Ocean Away" and "I'm In It With You"
- Milan: "Fire Blue" and "Is It Love"
- Lyon: "Ocean Away" and "Euphoria"
- Luxembourg: "Ride" and "Body"
- Birmingham: "Ride" and "Ocean Away"
- London: "Ride" and "Is It Love"
- Liverpool: "Ride" and "Ocean Away"
- Manchester: "Ride" and "Is It Love"
- Bristol: "Everytime" and "Body"
- Glasgow: Soundcheck was cancelled due to Loreen being on a vocal rest
- Dublin: "Ocean Away" (Only 1 song was performed)
- Belfast: "Ocean Away" and "My Heart Is Refusing Me"

== Wildfire Tour ==
Wildfire Tour
- Tour by Loreen
- Location: Europe
- Associated album: Wildfire
- No. of shows: 11

Loreen concert chronology
- Tour Life (2025); Wildfire Tour

The Wildfire Tour is the fifth concert tour by the Swedish singer Loreen. The tour was scheduled to commence on 22 September 2026, in Dublin, Ireland, and to conclude on 6 October 2026, in Amsterdam, the Netherlands, consisting of 11 shows. She announced the tour in February 2026, ahead of the release of her third studio album, Wildfire (2026). In August 2026, Loreen announced the tour had been postponed until early 2027; a reason was not provided for the postponement.

=== Postponed concerts ===
List of postponed concerts
Date (2026)	City	Country	Venue	Reason	Ref.
22 September	Dublin	Ireland	National Stadium	Undisclosed	
24 September	Glasgow	Scotland	O_{2} Academy Glasgow	Undisclosed	
25 September	Manchester	England	O2 Victoria Warehouse	Undisclosed	
26 September	London	England	O_{2} Academy Brixton	Undisclosed	
28 September	Cologne	Germany	Carlswerk Victoria	Undisclosed	
29 September	Brussels	Belgium	Cirque Royal	Undisclosed	
30 September	Paris	France	Salle Pleyel	Undisclosed	
2 October	Berlin	Germany	Astra Kulturhaus	Undisclosed	
3 October	Warsaw	Poland	Klub Stodoła	Undisclosed	
5 October	Hamburg	Germany	Große Freiheit 36	Undisclosed	
6 October	Amsterdam	Netherlands	Paradiso	Undisclosed	
