= Paper Light (Higher) =

Single by Loreen
- Released: 5 March 2015
- Recorded: 2014
- Genre: Electropop
- Length: 3:41
- Label: Warner Music Sweden
- Songwriter(s): Loreen Talhaoui; Tom Liljegren; Alexander "Alex" Ryberg
- Producer(s): Max Elto

Loreen singles chronology
"We Got the Power" (2013)	"Paper Light (Higher)" (2015)	"I'm in It with You" (2015)

Alternative cover
- "Paper Light (Revisited)" cover

"Paper Light (Higher)" is a song by Swedish singer Loreen. The song was written by the singer and its producers Tom Liljegren and Alexander "Alex" Ryberg.

== Background and release ==
During Loreen's visit to Montenegro in July 2014, she announced that her new album would probably be released in October 2014. She performed at the Celebration of Budva Tourist Organization and the National Day event at the Jaz Beach in Budva. During an interview with Prva.rs, she stated: "The new album is coming out in October and after that there will be a lot of touring. It's very different from 'Euphoria', it's a lot dirtier and more hip-hop." During a performance at Eurovision Gala Night at the Casino Luxembourg in Luxembourg City, she confirmed that the lead single from her new album was coming in March 2015. On 27 February, it was announced that Loreen's new single "Paper Light (Higher)" was released on 5 March 2015 in Scandinavia and was released worldwide on 9 March 2015.

== Live performances ==
Loreen premiered "Paper Light (Higher)" with the Ukrainian boy band Kazaky as an interval act during the Second Chance round of Melodifestivalen 2015 on 7 March. The song was intended to be the lead single from her second album, then tentatively titled Paperlight. On 30 April, Loreen performed the song during seventh Humorgalan UNICEF's telethon in Sweden. During the Eurovision Song Contest 2015, Loreen headlined the Vienna Life Ball, Europe's biggest charity event supporting people with HIV and AIDS in Austria, attending the event in a dress designed by Jean Paul Gaultier and performed "Paper Light (Higher)". On 23 May 2015, Loreen performed "Paper Light (Higher)" onstage at Cirkus in Helsinki as the headline act during the city's annual Eurovision Party. One day later, she performed the song during Childhood-dagen at Gröna Lund in Stockholm, Sweden.

== Track listing ==
Digital download
No.	Title	Length
1.	"Paper Light (Higher)"	3:41

== Chart performance ==
=== Weekly charts ===
Chart (2015)	Peak position
Sweden (Sverigetopplistan)	25
US Billboard Twitter Emerging Artists	7

== Release history ==
Region	Date	Format	Label
Sweden	5 March 2015	Digital download	Warner Music Sweden

== "Paper Light (Revisited)" ==
A remixed version of "Paper Light" premiered on Spotify on 17 April 2015. It was produced by Salvatore Ganacci and re-titled "Paper Light (Revisited)". The official video was released on YouTube on 7 May 2015.
