= We Got the Power =

We Got the Power may mean:

- "We Got the Power" (Gorillaz song), 2017
- "We Got the Power" (Loreen song), 2013
- "We Got the Power", a 2005 song by Dropkick Murphys from Singles Collection, Volume 2
