= Sober (Loreen song) =

Single by Loreen

from the album Heal
- Released: 12 September 2011
- Recorded: 2011
- Genre: Dance-pop; trance; Eurodance
- Length: 3:52
- Label: Warner Music Sweden
- Songwriters: Loreen, Moh Denebi, Bjorn Bjupstrom, Ali Payami

Loreen singles chronology
"My Heart is Refusing Me" (2011)	"Sober" (2011)	"Euphoria" (2012)

"Sober" is a song performed by Swedish pop singer and music producer Loreen. It was released as a digital download on 12 September 2011 in Sweden. The song peaked at number 26 on the Swedish Singles Chart six months later due to her victory at Melodifestivalen 2012 with Euphoria. A remixed version of the song was included on Loreen's debut album Heal (2012).

Album remix version received favorable reviews. Scandipop.co.uk claimed that the singles (including this song) don't ever "dip below being a 9.5 out of 10 moment." Higher Plain Music wrote positively claiming that it "returns to the catchy low-key whispery verse / vocal display chorus over earlier tracks" but that is more stop/start to make big distinctions" comparing to other songs in album. EscXtra praised the production : "this mix has given added strength to this track (...) so it would fit with the whole album." However the same critic criticized the vocal editing: "the effect of her voice delivering the lyrics is a little compromised compared to how it used to sound. I would have liked to have had the original cut of “Sober” as a bonus track at the end."

== Track listing ==
Digital download

No.	Title	Length
1.	"Sober"	3:52

Official Remixes

No.	Title	Length
1.	"Sober" (Ali Payami Radio Edit)	3:35
2.	"Sober" (PJ Harmony Radio Edit)	3:42
3.	"Sober" (Acoustic Version)	3:39
4.	"Sober" (Original Mix)	3:53

== Charts ==
Chart (2012)	Peak position
Sweden (Sverigetopplistan)	26
Sweden (Digilistan)	6

== Certifications ==
Region	Certification	Certified units/sales
Sweden (GLF)	Platinum	40,000^{‡}
^{‡} Sales+streaming figures based on certification alone.

== Release history ==
Country	Date	Format	Label
Sweden	12 September 2011	Digital download	Warner Music Sweden
