= In My Head (Loreen song) =

Single by Loreen

from the album Heal
- Released: 14 February 2013
- Recorded: 2011–12
- Genre: Electronic; Europop; trance
- Length: 3:29
- Label: Warner Music Sweden
- Songwriters: Loreen, Moh Denebi, Björn Djupström
- Producer: Tortuga

Loreen singles chronology
| "Crying Out Your Name" (2012) | "In My Head" (2013) | "We Got the Power" (2013) |

"In My Head" is a song performed by Swedish pop singer and music producer Loreen, it was released as the fifth single from her debut studio album Heal (2012). The song was written by Loreen, Moh Denebi, Björn Djupström and produced by Tortuga. It was released as a digital download on 14 February 2013 in Sweden. The track was originally planned to be the single that launched her album Heal but "Crying Out Your Name" was eventually chosen.

The release features a single edit, which is just under a minute shorter than the album version. It also features the Promise Land remix, both in a radio edit and an extended edit. The Promise Land remix gives ‘In My Head’ a slightly more club friendly feel, similarly to what the international version of "Crying Out Your Name" in 2012.

== Critical reception ==
In the review of the album, Scandipop said, (of 'In My Head'); "The frantic piano middle eight is pure beauty". They added 'In My Head' "seems like the no brainer to be the next single after Crying Out Your Name ".

== Live performances ==
Loreen performed "In My Head" live at The Qube in Belgium on December 3, 2012, and at the P3 Guld Awards in Gothenburg on January 19, 2013. She performed an acoustic version on Musikhjälpen on December 13, 2012, and again live in the Vakna studios on February 19, 2013.

== Track listing ==
Digital download

1. In My Head (Promise Land Radio Edit) - 3:29
2. In My Head (Single Edit) - 3:41
3. In My Head (Promise Land Extended) - 5:29

== Release history ==
| Country | Date | Format | Label |
|---|---|---|---|
| Sweden | February 14, 2013 | Digital download | Warner Music Sweden |
