= Ride (Loreen album) =

Studio album by Loreen
- Released: 24 November 2017
- Recorded: 2014–2017
- Genre: Indie rock; dream pop
- Label: BMG
- Producer: Loreen (also exec.); Fredrik Sonefors; Samuel Starck; Petter Winnberg

Loreen chronology
Nude (2017)	Ride (2017)	Så mycket bättre 2020 - Tolkningarna (2020)

Singles from Ride
- 1. "71 Charger" Released: 29 September 2017; 2. "Hate The Way I Love You" Released: 27 October 2017; 3. "Ride" Released: 12 December 2017

Ride is the second studio album by Swedish recording artist Loreen. The album was released on 24 November 2017 through BMG, five years after her debut album, Heal. The album also follows an EP titled Nude, released in August 2017. Three singles were released from the album: "71 Charger" (released on 29 September 2017), "Hate the Way I Love You" (released on 27 October 2017) and "Ride (released on 12 December 2017).

== Background ==
"The entire album is like a reflection of my own personal search process. I want to use my album as a platform to develop myself, and creativity is a part of it."

—Loreen talking about her album Ride.

The album was recorded from 2014 through to 2017 going through many stages. In 2014, Loreen stated about the album "It's completely different. There are a lot of hip-hop influences. I create based on how I feel. Right now I'm in a period where there is an aggressive touch to the music." At this time, she performed two songs "Jupiter Drive" and "Dumpster" expected to be singles from the album. During Loreen's visit in Montenegro in July 2014, she announced that her new album will be probably released in October 2014 however, Loreen stopped performing one of the songs, "Dumpster", and the album was seemingly delayed.

On 30 November 2016, it was revealed that Loreen would compete in Melodifestivalen 2017 with the song "Statements" for a chance to represent Sweden again at the Eurovision Song Contest 2017. During interviews for the event she stated that two EPs were being released, one in the spring and one in the autumn. In August 2017, it was announced that Loreen had parted from Warner Music and had signed with BMG Scandinavia. Following this new signing, music news rapidly accelerated with news of an EP, two singles and the full-length studio album in November of the same year.

== Composition ==
The album moves away from the dance sound of Heal to a darker, mid-tempo vibe whilst keeping Loreen's notable vocals and electronic sound. Scandipop describes "Hate The Way I Love You" as "A song that starts off as a stark and atmospheric ballad, before morphing into a Björk-esque dose of pulsating euphoria".

== Promotion ==
Loreen was interviewed on the Swedish breakfast show Nyhetsmorgon on 26 November 2017, where she also performed "Hate The Way I Love You" and "Ride". The following day, she held a private concert at Stockholm's Vasateatern where she performed all the tracks from the album.

== Track listing ==
Standard edition
No.	Title	Writer(s)	Producer(s)	Length
1.	"'71 Charger"	Loreen; Cassandra Ströberg; Fredrik Sonefors	Loreen; Fredrik Sonefors	4:12
2.	"Dreams"	Loreen; Jonas Wallin; Sebastian Furrer; Sterling Fox; Petter Winnberg	Petter Winnberg	4:40
3.	"Jupiter Drive"	Loreen; Adam Baptiste; Tim Geneve; Ted Krotkiewski	Petter Winnberg	5:25
4.	"Fire Blue"	Loreen; Jens Duvsjö	Petter Winnberg	4:20
5.	"Hate the Way I Love You"	Loreen; Fred Ball; Jonas Wallin; Samuel Starck; Adam Hagstrand	Loreen; Samuel Starck	6:38
6.	"I Go Ego"	Loreen; Linnea Södahl; Sebastian Furrer; Nils Törnqvist; Petter Granberg; Adam Hagstrand; Mats Sandahl; Robert Elovsson; Mikael Sundin	Petter Winnberg	3:30
7.	"Heart On Hold"	Loreen; Darius Kaya; Cecilia Nykvist	Loreen; Fredrik Sonefors	4:09
8.	"Love Me America"	Loreen; Jonas Wallin; Linnea Södahl; Sebastian Furrer; Petter Winnberg	Petter Winnberg	4:29
9.	"Ride"	Loreen; Jonas Wallin; Simon Johansson; Sebastian Furrer	Loreen; Fredrik Sonefors	5:11
10.	"'71 Charger" (String bonus track)	Loreen; Cassandra Ströberg; Fredrik Sonefors; Petter Winnberg	Petter Winnberg	3:43
Total length:				44:51

== Charts ==
Chart (2017)	Peak position
Swedish Albums (Sverigetopplistan)	31

== Release history ==
Regions	Dates	Format(s)	Label(s)
Worldwide	24 November 2017	CD, digital download	BMG Rights Management
