= Crying Out Your Name =

Single by Loreen

from the album Heal
- Released: 8 October 2012
- Recorded: 2011–12
- Genre: Dance; breakbeat; trip hop
- Length: 3:38
- Label: Warner Music Sweden
- Songwriter(s): Moh Denebi, Ana Diaz, Nick Jarl, Gino Yonan, Svante Halldin, Jakob Hazell
- Producer(s): SeventyEight

Loreen singles chronology
"Euphoria" (2012)	"Crying Out Your Name" (2012)	"In My Head" (2013)

"Crying Out Your Name" is a song performed by Swedish pop singer and music producer Loreen, it was released as the fourth single from her debut studio album Heal (2012). The song was written by Moh Denebi, Ana Diaz, Nick Jarl, Gino Yonan, Svante Halldin, Jakob Hazell and produced by SeventyEight. It was released as a digital download on 8 October 2012 in Sweden. The song debuted at number 42 on the Swedish Singles Chart and peaked at 19.

== Critical reception ==
This song was met with critical acclaim. Musicperk.com rated the song 8/10 quoting "Pretty great track indeed" Scandipop.co.uk lauded the song with "(n)ever dips below being a 9.5 out of 10 moment, not even for a second." David Lim was impressed "splendid, with its percolating synths and drum ‘n’ bass beats – is such a relatable self-destructive break up track. It totally got me with its raw flares of frustration and desperation." Higher Plain Music called the chorus of this song "epic." EscXtra praised the song by calling it one of favorites of album due to "the excellent vocal in the chorus as well as the beat of the track."

== Track listing ==
Digital download

1. Crying Out Your Name" – 3:38

Promo Remixes

1. "Crying Out Your Name (Promise Land Remix) 5:52
2. "Crying Out Your Name (K-Klass Remix) 6:31
3. "Crying Out Your Name (Lucas Nord Remix) 5:41
4. "Crying Out Your Name (Albin Myer Remix) 4:50
5. "Crying Out Your Name (Bauer & Landford Remix) 5:31
6. "Crying Out Your Name (Lucas Nord Remix Radio Edit) 3:44

== Credits and personnel ==
- Lead vocals – Loreen
- Producers – SeventyEight
- Lyrics – Moh Denebi, Ana Diaz, Niklas Jarl, Gino Yonan, Svante Halldin, Jakob Hazell
- Label: Warner Music Sweden

== Charts ==
Chart (2012)	Peak position
Sweden (Sverigetopplistan)	19
Sweden (Digilistan)	5

== Release history ==
Country	Date	Format	Label
Sweden	8 October 2012	Digital download	Warner Music Sweden
