= Heal (Loreen album) =

2012 studio album by Loreen

Studio album by Loreen
- Released: 24 October 2012
- Recorded: 2010–2012
- Studio: Cosmos Studio 1, Stockholm; Mohito, Stockholm; Riksmixningsverket, Stockholm; SeventyEight, Stockholm; Gallery, Prague; GIG, Oslo; Livingroom, Oslo
- Genre: Dance-pop; EDM
- Length: 48:15
- Label: Warner Music Sweden
- Producer: Loreen; Peter Cartiries; SeventyEight; Peter Boström; Robin Rocks & Rubio; Tortuga; Moh Denebi; Simen & Espen; J Mike; Blanks; Alex P.; Victory

Loreen chronology
Heal (2012)	Nude (2017)

Alternative cover
- Heal (2013 Edition) cover

Singles from Heal
- 1. "Euphoria" Released: 26 February 2012; 2. "My Heart Is Refusing Me" Released: 8 October 2012; 3. "Crying Out Your Name" Released: 8 October 2012; 4. "In My Head" Released: 14 February 2013; 5. "We Got the Power" Released: 15 May 2013

Heal is the debut studio album by Swedish singer Loreen, released on 24 October 2012 through Warner Music Sweden. It received positive reviews from critics and received commercial success in the charts, notably reaching number one in Sweden and was certified Platinum there.

Four singles were released from the album, "Euphoria" was released in February 2012 as the lead single, "My Heart Is Refusing Me" was released in international markets in a new remixed version as the second single in October 2012, "Crying Out Your Name" was released in Sweden only as the second single the same month. "In My Head" was released as the fourth single in February 2013. A fifth single "We Got the Power" was released as the lead single from the reissued version of "Heal" that was released in May 2013.

== Background ==
"I have told everybody to expect the unexpected. My album will surprise. It will have a very much darker tone than most would expect".

—Loreen talking about her album "Heal".

ESCDaily reported in August 2012 saying: "Signed by Warner Music Sweden, Loreen spent her time over the past month in the studio working with various producers for her anticipated first album. It was expected that her first single, 'My Heart is Refusing Me' as well as its follow-up 'Sober' would be featured on the record, along with 'Euphoria'." The official album cover was released on 1 October 2012. "Heal" was officially released on 24 October 2012. On 31 May 2013, Heal was re-released as Heal (2013 Edition), featuring two new tracks, "We Got the Power" and an acoustic version of "Euphoria", while excluding the song "See You Again".

== Composition ==
The album opens with "In My Head", the song has a throbbing bass beat and low brooding synth strings. The next track "My Heart Is Refusing Me" is in a new remixed form and is slightly different from the original version released in 2011. The song is a dance balladry track that has a chorus that formulaically expands after periods of restraint verses. "Everytime" was highly praised by critics, the song opens in an acoustic production, featuring only Loreen's voice and the piano. After the openings verse the beat kicks in and the production changes to heavy synths and claps. Euphoria is a dance song and the album version contains an extended intro which is not present in the single version, it opens with heavy strings before the songs starts. The following track, "Crying Out Your Name" features heavy synths and drum ‘n’ bass beats, described as a relatable self-destructive break up track. "Do We Even Matter" is a mid-tempo song that features a lullaby outro of a finger piano that gently tinkles away over the main chord melody.

"Sidewalk" was described to have a R&B feel about it at the start but later when the synth comes in and the song starts to build into a superb musical mix with Loreen's voice layered through it. The next track "Sober" was originally released in late 2011, and like "My Heart Refusing Me" has been remixed, this version is more uptempo than the original. "If She’s The One" has Eastern influences in its production. "Breaking Robot" is an uptempo track with heavy synths that features a distorted male vocal during the chorus of the song. "See You Again" described as the most commercial song besides "Euphoria", the track opens with some guitar chords being strummed and critics compared the song's chorus to Rihanna's song "Where Have You Been". The final track, "Heal" has a sombre electronica feel to it and described as a heartfelt finale where Loreen cries out the chorus lines like a diva whilst the keyboards sound slightly warped and discordant.

== Critical reception ==
Scandipop.co.uk were very positive in their review, writing "So all is well – we’re happy campers." They praised the more dance-ready songs on the album, while the criticized the balladry songs, by stating "although we wouldn’t recommend judging the album too much on what you hear in these, they’re really not the best representation of any of the songs." Samesame.com.au gave the album a positive review as well, saying: "Heal is an alluring blend of pulsating dance pop that feel more subtle than what one might initially expect from a Eurovision pop purveyor, in the current pop market that is already fluent in electronic dance music parlance, Heal speaks a language of its own – shrugging off trendy dubstep inflections in favour of a richer, soundscape that enhance its emotive lyrics rather than compete with it.

Higher Plain Music also gave the album a positive review stating: ""Heal" is something of a sombre dance album revelation, and is the most solid albums from a Eurovision artist I’ve come across in years. It's got everything a guilty pleasure would usually have but is given a much more mature edge with slick production, excellent vocals and enough minor chords to make each song sound valid and non-cheesed. Highly, highly recommended for those who look for "good pop". Escxtra.com gave the album a positive review saying: "I think this is a solid début album for Loreen and am very impressed with the overall quality of it. I can confidently say that I give the album 5 stars due to its commercial elements, catchy choruses, the dance beats as well as the raw emotion felt in Loreen’s vocal throughout the album.

== Commercial performance ==
"Heal" debuted in Sweden at number one, and stayed inside the top 10 for seven weeks, and remained in the chart for 19 weeks. It was later certified Platinum there after selling 40,000 copies there. Elsewhere the album achieved moderate success, it reached the top 10 in Finland, Estonia and Switzerland and peaked inside the top 20 in countries such as Denmark, Netherlands and Germany. In the UK Albums Chart, the album peaked at number 71 and stayed on the chart for one week. On 21 November 2012, this album was released in Japan with 3 bonus tracks but failed to enter charts.

== Promotion ==
To promote the album, Loreen appeared as a musical guest on several European TV shows, including Polish talent show Must Be the Music on 21 October 2012, the opening of the Stockholm's Friends Arena on 27 October 2012, the second season of the Romanian version of X Factor on 18 November 2012 and the final of the third series of Dutch talent show The Voice of Holland. She also flew to Germany where she performed at the Helen Fischer Show on 25 December 2012. On the New Year's Eve celebrations, Loreen performed in some countries in order to celebrate the start of the new year, performing in China, Belgium, at the Brandenburg Gate in Berlin, Germany, and in Spain. Loreen premiered a new single included in the reissue of her debut album in the opening of the 2013 Eurovision Song Contest. The song is called "We Got the Power", and was produced by Patrik Berger and written by Ester Dean, who have previously worked with Icona Pop, Rihanna and Robyn. She also performed at the 2013 Sopot International Song Festival in Poland. In 2014, she co-headlined the 2014 Art on Ice Tour in Finland, Sweden and Switzerland.

== Singles ==
"My Heart Is Refusing Me" was originally released as a standalone single on 27 February 2011. The song peaked to number 9 on the Swedish Singles Chart. The song appears remixed on the album and was re-released as the album's second international single on 8 October 2012. "Sober" was also released as a standalone single on 12 September 2011 and appears in a remixed form on the album. The song peaked to number 26 on the Swedish Singles Chart. "Euphoria" was released as the album's first international single. The song was released on 26 February 2012. She represented Sweden in the Eurovision Song Contest 2012 in Baku, Azerbaijan, with the song and won the contest with 372 points. Commercially, the song was a success, not only in European markets, but also in different countries. "Crying Out Your Name" was released as the fourth Swedish single from the album on 8 October 2012. The song has so far peaked at number 19 on the Swedish Singles Chart. "In My Head" was released as the fifth Swedish single off the album on 14 February 2013. Single version of this song differs from the album version where the single version is under one minute shorter and the release features the Promise Land remix in radio and extended edit. "Heal" was released as a promo single alongside a music video released on the 20 of February. In cooperation with Efterlyst Sweden and Directed by Robin Kempe-Bergman

== Track listing ==
Standard edition
No.	Title	Writer(s)	Producer(s)	Length
1.	"In My Head"	Loreen; Moh Denebi; Björn Djupström	Tortuga	4:25
2.	"My Heart Is Refusing Me"	Loreen; Denebi; Djupström	Alex P.; Victory	3:45
3.	"Everytime"	Espen Berg; Marianne Sveen; Simen M Eriksrud; Tobias Frelin	Simen & Espen	4:56
4.	"Euphoria"	Thomas G:son; Peter Boström	Boström; SeventyEight	3:33
5.	"Crying Out Your Name"	Denebi; Ana Diaz; Nick Jarl; Gino Yonan; Svante Halldin; Jakob Hazell	SeventyEight	3:38
6.	"Do We Even Matter"	Loreen; Denebi; Djupström	Tortuga; Ollie Olson (co.)	4:04
7.	"Sidewalk"	Loreen; Frelin; Djupström; Adam Baptiste	Tortuga	4:11
8.	"Sober"	Loreen; Denebi; Djupström; Ali Payami	Robin Rocks & Rubio	3:37
9.	"If She's the One"	Loreen; Denebi; Djupström	Denebi	4:02
10.	"Breaking Robot"	Loreen; Denebi; Djupström; Payami	Denebi	3:29
11.	"See You Again"	James "JHart" Abrahart; Oh, Hush!; J Mike; MadMax	J Mike; MadMax	3:58
12.	"Heal" (featuring Blanks)	Yonan; Denebi; Peter Cartriers	Blanks	4:39
Total length:				48:15

Japanese edition bonus tracks
No.	Title	Writer(s)	Length
13.	"Euphoria" (single version)	G:son; Boström	3:01
14.	"Euphoria" (acoustic guitar version)	G:son; Boström	3:42
15.	"Euphoria" (acoustic strings version)	G:son; Boström	4:39
Total length:			58:37

2013 edition
No.	Title	Writer(s)	Producer(s)	Length
1.	"We Got the Power"	Ester Dean; Geoff Earley	Patrik Berger	3:27
2.	"My Heart Is Refusing Me"	Loreen; Denebi; Djupström	SeventyEight	3:43
3.	"Everytime"	Berg; Sveen; Eriksrud; Frelin	Simen & Espen	4:56
4.	"Euphoria"	G:son; Boström	Boström; SeventyEight	3:33
5.	"Crying Out Your Name"	Denebi; Diaz; Jarl; Yonan; Halldin; Hazell	SeventyEight	3:38
6.	"Do We Even Matter"	Loreen; Denebi; Djupström	Tortuga	4:04
7.	"Sidewalk"	Loreen; Frelin; Djupström; Baptiste	Tortuga	4:11
8.	"Sober"	Loreen; Denebi; Djupström; Payami	Robin Rocks & Rubio	3:37
9.	"If She's the One"	Loreen; Denebi; Djupström	Denebi	4:02
10.	"Breaking Robot"	Loreen; Denebi; Djupström; Payami	Denebi	3:29
11.	"In My Head"	Loreen; Denebi; Djupström	Tortuga	4:25
12.	"Heal" (featuring Blanks)	Yonan; Denebi; Cartriers	Blanks	4:39
13.	"Euphoria" (acoustic version)	G:son; Boström		4:10
Total length:				51:54

== Charts ==
=== Weekly charts ===
Weekly chart performance for Heal
Chart (2012–23)	Peak position
Austrian Albums (Ö3 Austria)	26
Belgian Albums (Ultratop Flanders)	21
Belgian Albums (Ultratop Wallonia)	85
Danish Albums (Hitlisten)	12
Dutch Albums (Album Top 100)	12
Finnish Albums (Suomen virallinen lista)	6
French Digital Albums (SNEP)	53
German Albums (Offizielle Top 100)	16
Lithuanian Albums (AGATA)	69
Norwegian Albums (VG-lista)	6
Spanish Albums (PROMUSICAE)	23
Swedish Albums (Sverigetopplistan)	1
Swiss Albums (Schweizer Hitparade)	7
UK Albums (OCC)	71
UK Album Downloads (OCC)	36

=== Year-end charts ===
Year-end chart performance for Heal
Chart (2012)	Position
Swedish Albums (Sverigetopplistan)	14

== Certifications ==
Certifications for Heal
Region	Certification	Certified units/sales
Sweden (GLF)	Platinum	40,000^{‡}
^{‡} Sales+streaming figures based on certification alone.

== Release history ==
Release history and formats for Heal
Regions	Dates	Format(s)	Label(s)
Sweden	24 October 2012	CD, digital download	Warner Music
Norway	24 October 2012	CD, digital download	Warner Music
Finland	24 October 2012	CD, digital download	Warner Music
Germany	26 October 2012	CD, digital download	Warner Music
Belgium	26 October 2012	CD, digital download	Warner Music
Netherlands	26 October 2012	CD, digital download	Warner Music
United Kingdom	29 October 2012	CD, digital download	Warner Bros.
Ireland	29 October 2012	CD, digital download	Warner Bros.
Canada	30 October 2012	CD, digital download	Warner Music
Spain	12 November 2012	CD, digital download	Warner Music
Japan	21 November 2012	CD, digital download	Warner Music
