= My Heart Is Refusing Me =

Single by Loreen

from the album Heal
- Released: 27 February 2011
- Recorded: 2010
- Genre: Dance-pop
- Length: 3:45
- Label: Warner Music Sweden
- Songwriters: Moh Denebi, Björn Djupström, Loreen

Loreen singles chronology
"My Heart Is Refusing Me" (2011)	"Sober" (2011)

Loreen international singles chronology
"Euphoria" (2012)	"My Heart Is Refusing Me" (2012)	"We Got the Power" (2013)

Alternative cover
- International artwork

Music video
- "My Heart Is Refusing Me" (Official) on YouTube

"My Heart Is Refusing Me" is the debut single by Swedish pop singer and songwriter Loreen, released as a digital download on 27 February 2011 in Sweden. The song peaked to number 9 on the Swedish singles chart. She co-wrote the song with Moh Denebi and Björn Djupström. The version that appears on her debut studio album Heal is the 2012 re-release, which was the second international single after "Euphoria".

== Background and release ==
After Loreen's win in the Eurovision Song Contest 2012 with "Euphoria", "My Heart Is Refusing Me" was released as her second international single from Heal. The single was released internationally on October 8, 2012, in a remixed version that is different from the original version that was released in 2011.

== Composition ==
There are two versions of the single. The first was the original release version, which was a more lowtempo dance-pop song, while the album version (known as the re-release) is a more uptempo and has slightly different production. According to Discogs, the song is influenced by electronic, pop, house and Europop styles. According to Brian O'Reilly from The Irish Independent, he said the song "has its similarities to its predecessor ("Euphoria") – the pulsing club beat, the drama of the interplay between light and dark and of course Loreen’s fantastic powerful vocals." He also said "There is a unique dynamic to the song when the ancient chant-like backing vocals help give it an authenticity beyond the usual in the dance genre." The song features instrumentation of synthesizers, strings, and other keyboards. He noted the lyrical content as being "quite dark yet very relatable" and said there was the "melancholy in the verses is fully explained by the chorus." Higher Plain Music described the song "more classic dance with huge tom drums and a huge soaring chorus complete raving synths and catchy ad-lib hooks."

== Critical reception ==
"My Heart is Refusing Me" received critical acclaim from music critics upon release, with most critics noting similarities to her previous single, "Euphoria". ScandiPop.co.uk gave it a positive review, saying "The words “even better than the original” spring to mind. Seriously. As kicks up the arse go, this is at hospitalisation level." Samesame.co.au called the song one of the highlights of the album, saying "is a showcase of pedigree dance balladry – just like ‘Euphoria’ – it comes complete with a chorus that formulaically expands after periods of restraint verses." He also stated that along with the other singles on the album; "make sense as the shining ambassadors of Loreen‘s album but they’re not necessarily indicative of its scope." Brian O'Reilly from The Irish Independent was very positive, awarding the song 9 stars out of 10, stating "‘My heart is refusing me’ really does what really great dance music should do – it teases the listener throughout, leaving them in anticipation for a big final chorus where all the elements introduced throughout the song come together."

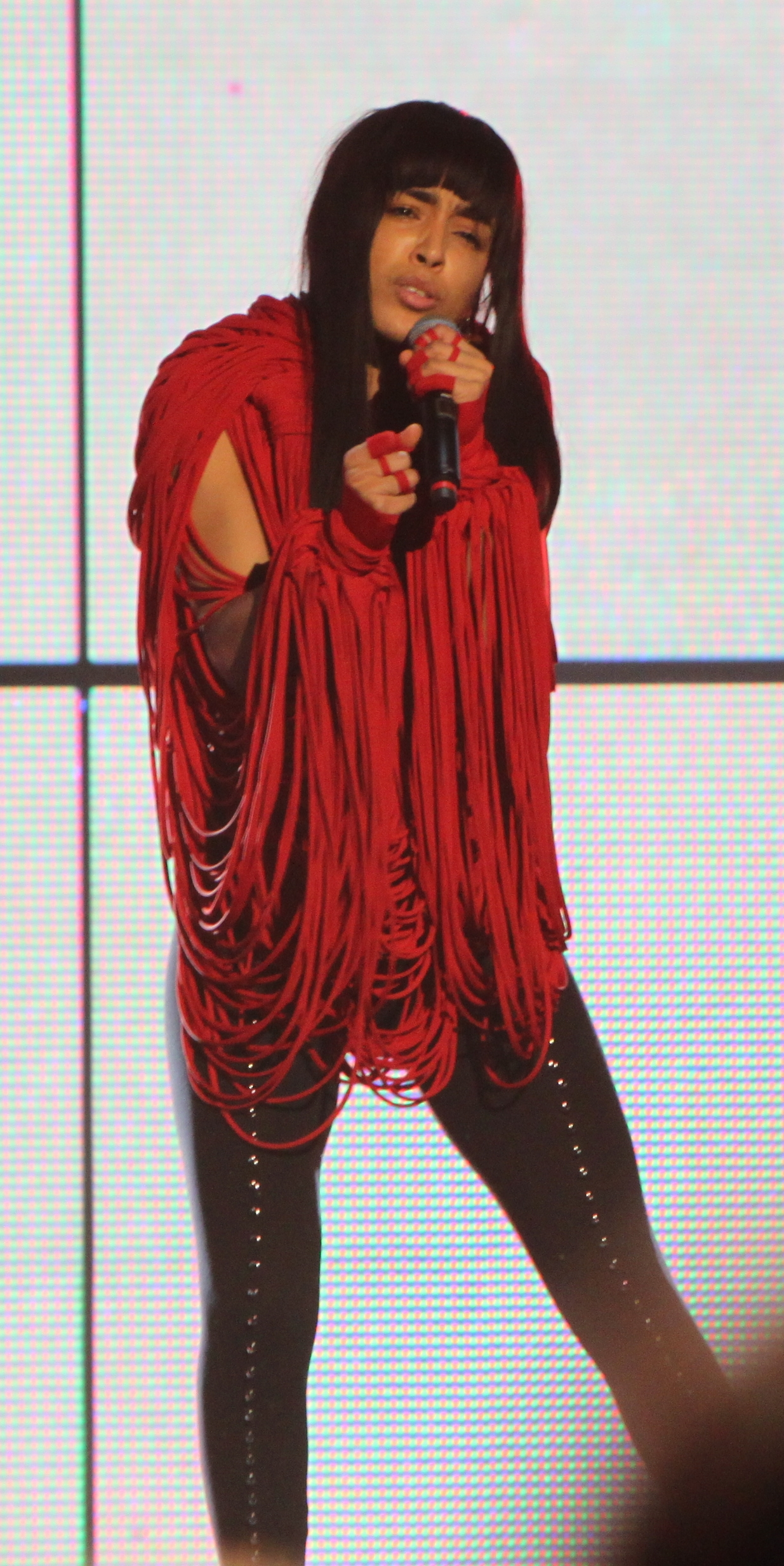
Loreen performing the song in 2011.

EscXtra critic added that this song was "a strong view on which way the album was going in."

== Commercial performance ==
"My Heart Is Refusing Me" first entered in 2011 on the Swedish Singles Chart at number nine, where it ultimately peaked. The song descended the way out, staying for 19 weeks on the chart. When it was re-released in mid-2012, the song re-entered at sixty, and peaked at number twenty-two and ultimately stayed in the charts for eleven weeks. The song managed to chart in other European markets. The song debuted at seventy-nine on the Dutch Singles chart, and peaked at number forty-six. The song spent at sole week at number forty-one on the Spanish Singles Chart and a sole week on the Belgium Singles Chart at forty-four. The song debuted at #44 in Belgium, #41 in Spain, #79 in the Netherlands and #10 in Finland.

== Promotion and nominations ==
On 12 February 2011, Loreen competed in the second semi-final of Melodifestivalen 2011 with My Heart Is Refusing Me placing fourth in Gothenburg, she competed in the Second Chance round, but failed to qualify to the final after a sing-off with Sara Varga. In 2012, "My Heart Is Refusing Me" won the "Tredje Chansen" (Third Chance) contest promoted by SVT. The Tredje Chansen gathered the 32 most memorable songs in the past 10 years of Melodifestivalen which never reached the final and gave them one more chance to compete for a place in it. All votes were cast online by internet viewers. Loreen won in the Heat (7281 votes) and in the Final (9416 votes). The official music video premiered on June 28, 2013, on Loreen's official YouTube channel, with the video directed by Liza Minou Morberg.

== Track listing ==
Digital download

1. "My Heart Is Refusing Me" - 3:07
2. "My Heart Is Refusing Me" (Singback) - 3:08
3. "My Heart Is Refusing Me" (Instrumental) - 3:06

International digital download

1. "My Heart Is Refusing Me (Alex P & Victory Version)" - 3:42
2. "My Heart Is Refusing Me (SeventyEight Version)" - 3:34

Official Promo Remixes

1. "My Heart Is Refusing Me (SeventyEight Version) 3:34
2. "My Heart is Refusing Me (Ali Payami Remix) 4:40
3. "My Heart Is Refusing Me (PJ Harmony Remix) 3:14
4. "My Heart Is Refusing Me (Amarillo & Finer Remix Radio Version) 3:37
5. "My Heart Is Refusing Me (Amarillo & Finer Remix Long Version) 7:20
6. "My Heart Is Refusing Me (Acoustic Version) 3:33
7. "My Heart Is Refusing Me (Electro Acoustic Version) 3:38
8. "My Heart Is Refusing Me (Light Acoustic Version) 4:04
9. "My Heart Is Refusing Me (Anders Nyman Radio Edit) 3:28
10. "My Heart Is Refusing Me (Anders Nyman Remix) 6:46
11. "My Heart Is Refusing Me (Promise Land Remix) 5:20
12. "My Heart Is Refusing Me (Disfunktion Remix) 7:21
13. "My Heart Is Refusing Me (Sam Skilz Remix) 6:27
14. "My Heart Is Refusing Me (Benassi Extended Version) 5:12
15. "My Heart Is Refusing Me (Benassi Radio Edit) 3:1
16. "My Heart Is Refusing Me (Benassi Instrumental Version) 5:12

== Chart performance ==
=== Weekly charts ===
Weekly chart performance for "My Heart Is Refusing Me"
Chart (2011–2013)	Peak position
Austria (Ö3 Austria Top 40)	59
Belgium (Ultratop 50 Flanders)	44
CIS Airplay (TopHit)	28
Finland (The Official Finnish Download Chart)	4
Germany (GfK)	41
Netherlands (Dutch Top 40)	26
Netherlands (Single Top 100)	46
Russia Airplay (TopHit)	23
Spain (Promusicae)	41
Sweden (Sverigetopplistan)	9
Sweden (Digilistan)	3
Switzerland (Schweizer Hitparade)	18
Ukraine Airplay (TopHit)	81

=== Monthly charts ===
2013 monthly chart performance for "My Heart Is Refusing Me"
Chart (2013)	Peak position
CIS Airplay (TopHit)	32
Russia Airplay (TopHit)	28

=== Year-end charts ===
2011 year-end chart performance for "My Heart Is Refusing Me"
Chart (2011)	Position
Sweden (Sverigetopplistan)	71
Sweden (Digilistan)	19

2013 year-end chart performance for "My Heart Is Refusing Me"
Chart (2013)	Position
CIS Airplay (TopHit)	61
Russia Airplay (TopHit)	59

== Certifications ==
Region	Certification	Certified units/sales
Sweden (GLF)	2× Platinum	80,000^{‡}
^{‡} Sales+streaming figures based on certification alone.

== Release history ==
Country	Date	Format	Label
Sweden	27 February 2011	Digital download	Warner Music Sweden
Worldwide	8 October 2012	Digital download	Warner Music Sweden
