= We Got the Power (Loreen song) =

Single by Loreen

from the album Heal (Edition 2013)
- Released: 15 May 2013
- Recorded: 2012
- Genre: Pop; electro rock
- Length: 3:27
- Label: Warner Music Sweden
- Songwriter(s): Ester Dean; Geoff Earley
- Producer(s): Patrik Berger

Loreen singles chronology
"In My Head" (2013)	"We Got the Power" (2013)	"Paper Light (Higher)" (2015)

"We Got the Power" is a song by Swedish singer Loreen. The song was written by Ester Dean and Geoff Earley. It was released in Sweden as a digital download by Warner Music Sweden on 15 May 2013. She performed the song during the final of the Eurovision Song Contest 2013. The song was included as the fourth overall single from the reissue of Loreen's debut studio album Heal.

== Live performances ==
On May 18, 2013, Loreen performed the song for the first time live during the final of the Eurovision Song Contest 2013, she also performed her 2012 Eurovision winning song "Euphoria" and "My Heart Is Refusing Me".

== Music video ==
The official music video premiered on June 5 on Loreen's official YouTube channel and it was directed by herself with Charli Ljung as cinematographer.

== Track listing ==
Digital download
No.	Title	Length
1.	"We Got the Power"	3:27

UK Digital download
No.	Title	Length
1.	"We Got the Power"	3:27
2.	"We Got the Power" (Remix)	3:12

== Charts ==
Chart performance for "We Got the Power"
Chart (2013)	Peak position
Ireland (IRMA)	98
Poland (Polish Airplay Charts – New Top 5)	1
Romania (Romanian Top 100)	39
Sweden (DigiListan)	9
Sweden (Sverigetopplistan)	52
Switzerland (Schweizer Hitparade)	70
Ukraine Airplay (TopHit)	154

== Certifications ==
Region	Certification	Certified units/sales
Sweden (GLF)	Gold	20,000^{‡}
^{‡} Sales+streaming figures based on certification alone.

== Release history ==
Country	Date	Format	Label
Sweden	15 May 2013	Digital download	Warner Music Sweden
United Kingdom	15 May 2013	Digital download	Warner Music Sweden
