= Loreen =

Swedish singer (born 1983)

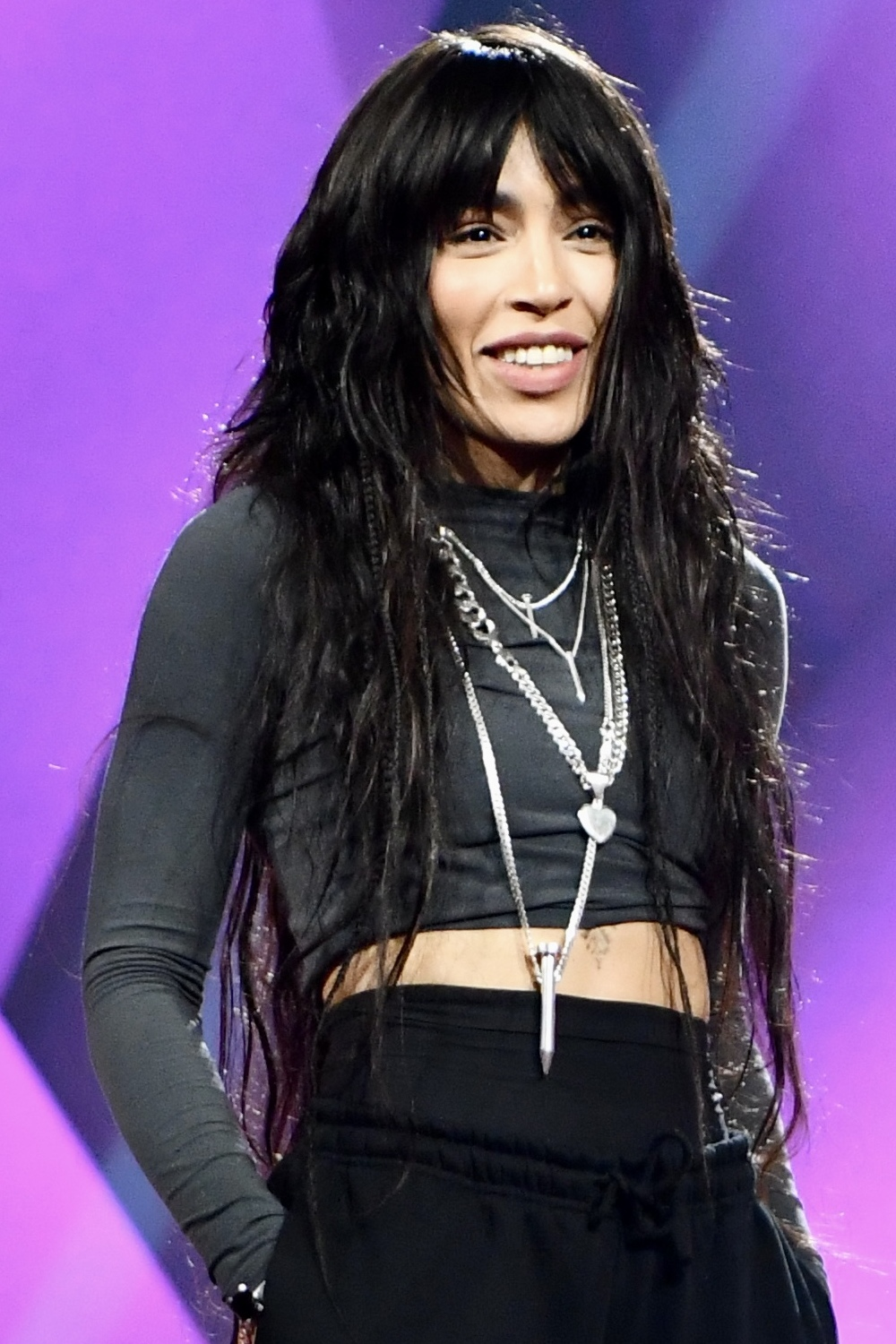
- Loreen in February 2023

Background information
- Born: Lorine Zineb Nora Talhaoui; 16 October 1983 (age 43); Åkersberga, Sweden
- Genre: Dance-pop
- Occupations: Singer; songwriter
- Years active: 2004–present
- Labels: Warner (Note: In Warner from 2011 to 2017); BMG (Note: In BMG, solely in 2017); Universal (Note: In Universal from 2020 to 2024.); Promised Land Recordings (Note: In this label solely in 2024.); Polydor France (Note: In label since 2025.)
- Website: loreenofficial.com

Lorine Zineb Nora Talhaoui (Arabic: لورين زينب نورا طلحاوي, Berber languages: ⵍⵓⵔⵉⵏ ⵣⵉⵏⴱ ⵏⵓⵕⴰ ⵟⵍⵃⴰⵡⵉ; born 16 October 1983), known professionally as Loreen (Swedish: [lɔˈreːn]), is a Swedish singer-songwriter. Representing Sweden, she won the Eurovision Song Contest in 2012 and 2023 with the songs "Euphoria" and "Tattoo" respectively. She is the second performer, after Johnny Logan, to win the contest twice, and the first woman to do so.

Interested in becoming a musician, Loreen finished fourth in the Idol 2004 television competition. The following year, she released her first single, "The Snake", with the band Rob'n'Raz, and became a television presenter on TV400. While working as a segment producer and director for several Swedish reality TV shows, she entered Melodifestivalen 2011 with the song "My Heart Is Refusing Me", which became a top 10 hit in Sweden. She had two top 20 hits in Sweden with the singles "Crying Out Your Name" (2012) and her Melodifestivalen 2017 entry "Statements".

== Early life ==
Lorine Zineb Nora Talhaoui was born on 16 October 1983 in Åkersberga, Sweden to Moroccan Berber parents. After her parents' divorce when she was six, Loreen moved with her mother and five younger siblings to Västerås. She grew up there, and calls it her hometown. She spent most of her teenage years in Gryta, a residential area in the city.

== Music career ==
=== 2004–2010: Idol ===
Loreen became known to Swedish audiences after taking part in the Swedish Idol 2004, under the name Lorén Talhaoui. During the qualification round, she placed third with the public vote. She would have been eliminated, but received a wildcard from the judges, allowing her to compete in the program. She finished fourth overall, and was eliminated during the eighth week. After Idol, in 2005, she released a promotional single, "The Snake", with the group Rob'n'Raz. That same year, she also presented the TV show Lyssna, broadcast by the Swedish station TV400. She then took a hiatus from more visible roles, and worked as a segment producer and director for reality TV shows such as TV3's Värsta pojkvänsakademin, TV4's Matakuten and SVT's Frufritt.

Episode	Theme	Song	Original artist	Performance order	Result
Audition	Free choice	"Love Is on the Way"	Billy Porter	—N/a	Judges' Wildcard
Week 1	My idol	"If I Ain't Got You"	Alicia Keys	7	Safe
Week 2	Chart toppers	"Just Like a Pill"	Pink	10	Bottom three
Week 3	Soul	"I Wish"	Stevie Wonder	3	Safe
Week 4	Swedish hits	"Vill ha dig"	Freestyle	4	Safe
Week 5	Max Martin	"Stronger"	Britney Spears	5	Safe
Week 6	Cocktail	"Where Do I Begin?"	Andy Williams / Shirley Bassey	6	Safe
Week 7	Soundtracks	"(I've Had) The Time of My Life"	Bill Medley and Jennifer Warnes	2	Bottom two
Week 8	My Birth Year (1983)	"Thriller"	Michael Jackson	2	Eliminated
Week 8	My Birth Year (1983)	"Every Breath You Take"	The Police	2	Eliminated

=== 2011–2013: Melodifestivalen, Eurovision Song Contest and Heal ===
Loreen returned to the public eye when she took part in Melodifestivalen 2011 with the song "My Heart Is Refusing Me", which she co-wrote with Moh Denebi and Björn Djupström. After coming fourth in the second semi-final in Gothenburg on 12 February 2011, she competed in the Second Chance round, but failed to qualify for the final after a sing-off with Sara Varga. The song was released on 11 March 2011 and became a hit on the Swedish Singles Chart, debuting and peaking at number 9. Following Loreen's success a year later, the song re-entered the chart, peaking at number 22 in May 2012.

In the first semi-final of Melodifestivalen 2012 on 4 February, Loreen advanced directly to the final round with her entry "Euphoria", written by Thomas G:son and Peter Boström. She won the national final on 10 March with a combined total of 268 points and represented Sweden in the Eurovision Song Contest 2012 in Baku, Azerbaijan. The song won the competition with a total of 372 points from 40 voting countries out of 42 (Italy was the exception, and Sweden could not vote for itself). According to online betting companies, she was the favourite to win the contest. On 3 June 2012, "Euphoria" charted at number three on the UK Official Singles Chart, the highest chart position for a non-UK Eurovision entry since Johnny Logan's "Hold Me Now" in 1987. The single sold 62,148 copies in its first week in the United Kingdom. "Euphoria" is also noted for having a consistent chart presence in the UK, remaining in the top 20 for weeks after the competition, which was rare for a Eurovision song. On 21 June 2012, Loreen made an appearance at the MTV World Stage in Gothenburg. The title of her debut album, Heal, was confirmed in late August 2012. Released on 24 October 2012, Heal debuted atop the Sverigetopplistan Albums Top 60. It was certified platinum in Sweden during its second week, denoting domestic shipments exceeding 40,000 units. A remix version of "My Heart Is Refusing Me" was released on 8 October 2012 as the second European single from the album. On the same day, "Crying Out Your Name" was released as the fourth single in her native Sweden.

To promote the album, Loreen appeared as a musical guest on several European TV shows, including Polish talent show Must Be the Music on 21 October 2012, the second season of the Romanian version of X Factor on 18 November 2012 and the final of the third series of Dutch talent show The Voice of Holland. Loreen premiered a new single included in the reissue of her debut album in the opening of the Eurovision Song Contest 2013. The song is called "We Got the Power", and was produced by Patrik Berger and written by Ester Dean, who have previously worked with Icona Pop, Rihanna and Robyn.

=== 2014–2015: Paperlight project and touring ===
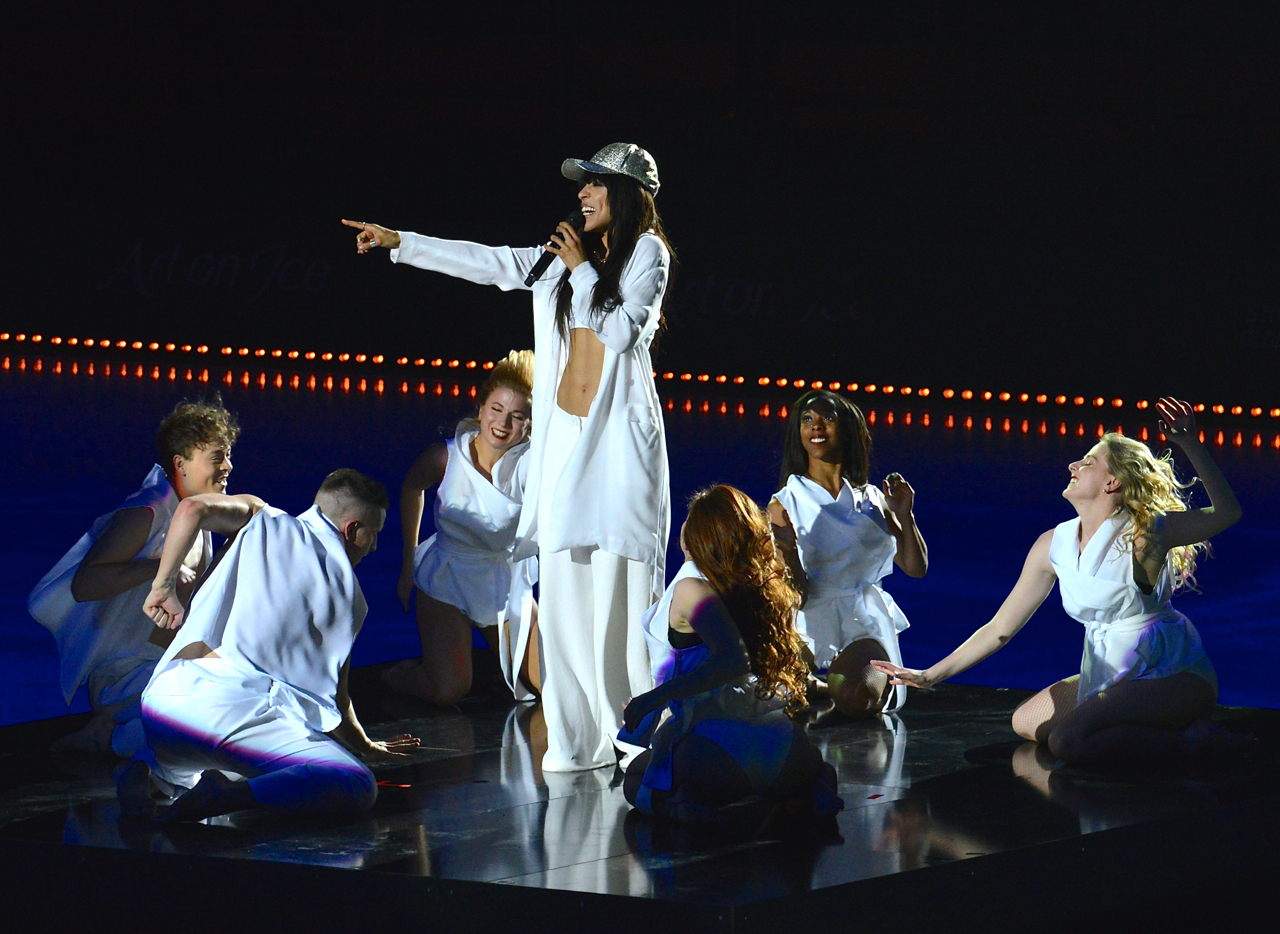
Loreen performing at Art on Ice 2014 at the Ericsson Globe in Stockholm.

In October 2013, Loreen was nominated for five World Music Awards. Later that month, Art on Ice announced she would be one of the artists performing on their 2014 tour, which had the concept of combining live music with performances from figure skaters. The tour took place in Finland, Sweden and Switzerland.

In January 2014, Swedish SVT resurrected their prize winning series Sápmi Sessions in which well known Swedish artists travel North to meet their talented counterparts within the Sami population, and embark on a new collaboration. They have never met before, but have three days to write and record a whole new song together. Loreen herself was the subject of the first episode, working with Ingá-Máret Gaup-Juuso and coming up with the song "Son" for her new album.

Loreen embarked on the Tour XIV in April 2014 and performed in several European countries. On 7 April, during a concert in Amsterdam, Loreen announced that "Jupiter Drive" and "Dumpster" had been chosen as the next singles for her next album, to be released in August 2014. That same month it was announced that Loreen had started planning her second studio album, working with producers such as Taped Rai, Ted Krotkiewski, Tobias Fröberg and Tim Denéve. In May 2014, Loreen announced her first concert residency: En Euforisk Jul. The show was performed at the Moriska Paviljongen in Malmö, Sweden from 26 November and concluded on 20 December and was a Christmas show. Loreen grossed more than US$372.000 (2.885.139,00 SEK) and En Euforisk Jul was the 16th biggest selling tour by a Swedish singer in Sweden in 2014. During her visit to Montenegro in July 2014 she announced her album was to be released probably in October 2014. She headlined the Celebration of Budva Tourist Organization and the National Day event at the Jaz Beach in Budva. During an interview with Prva.rs, she said: "The new album is coming out in October and after that there will be a lot of touring. It's very different from "Euphoria", it's a lot dirtier and more hip hop." In summer 2014, Loreen was nominated for three Rockbjörnen. Additionally, Loreen performed at the 11th Kristallen in Sweden, where she sang a cover of Rodríguez's "Sugar Man", as part of the ceremony's "In Memoriam" segment. On 20 September, Loreen performed at Eurasian Music Awards at the Central Stadium in Almaty, Kazakhstan. Loreen performed at Eurovision Gala Night at the Casino Luxembourg in Luxembourg and she confirmed that the single of her new album was coming soon in March 2015. On 27 February, it was announced that Loreen's new single "Paper Light (Higher)" was to be released on 5 March 2015 in Scandinavia and worldwide on 9 March.

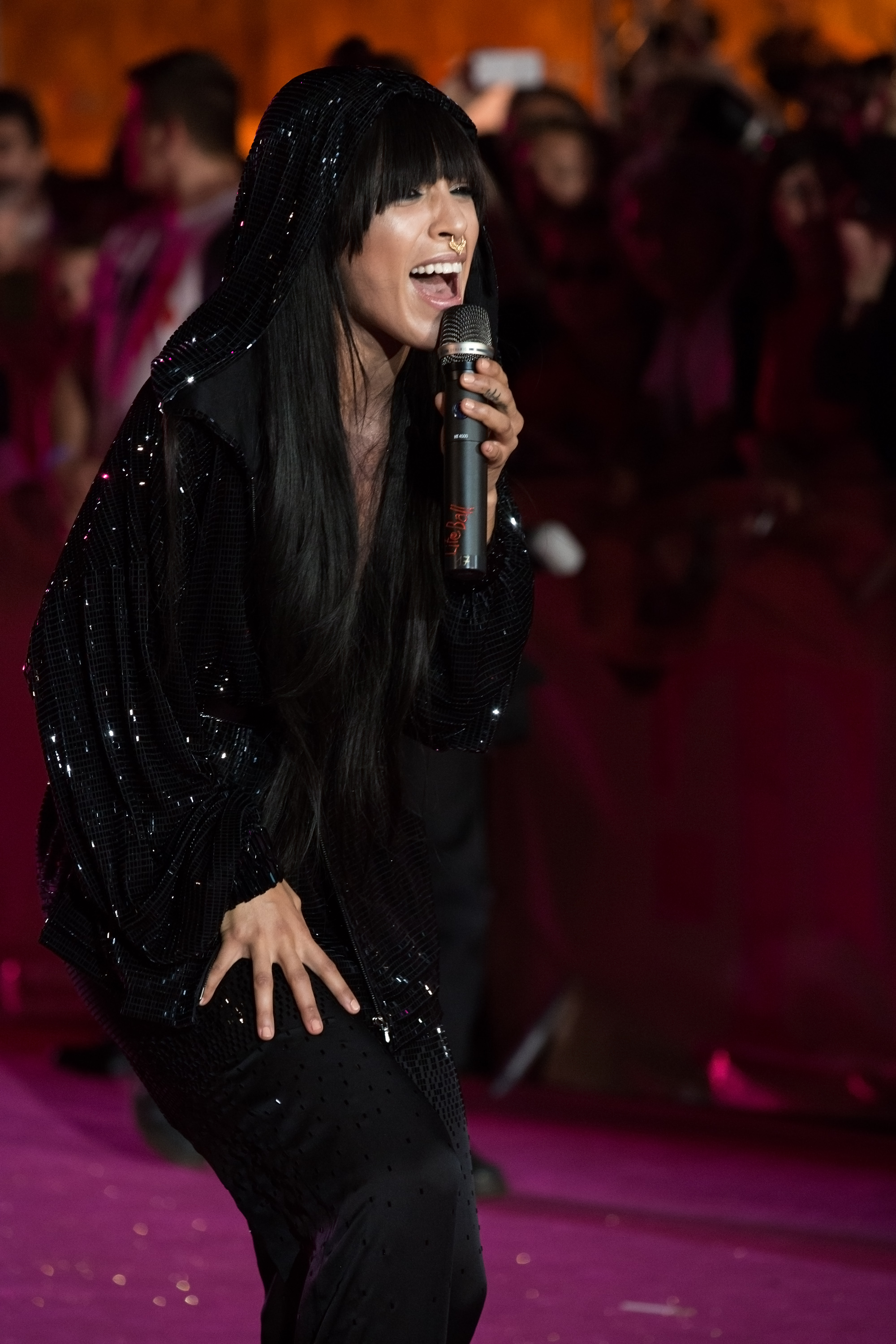
Loreen performing at the 2015 Life Ball in Vienna, Austria.

On 22 November 2014, Loreen announced on Instagram that she would be debuting a new project, called Paperlight. She has been working in the studio with Kiesza. Loreen performed at the special concert show Eurovision Song Contest's Greatest Hits in London, produced by the BBC and the EBU, which commemorated the 60th anniversary of the Eurovision Song Contest. Loreen performed as interval act during the Second Chance round of Melodifestivalen 2015 on 7 March singing the lead single off of Paperlight, "Paper Light (Higher)". In May 2015, Loreen headlined the Vienna Life Ball, Europe's biggest charity event supporting people with HIV and AIDS, attending the event in a dress designed by Jean Paul Gaultier. From 21 November to 18 December 2015, Loreen jointed the Christmas tour Julgalan 2015 in Sweden along with Måns Zelmerlöw, Lena Philipsson, Miss Li, Ola Salo, Jill Johnson, Petter, Hasse Andersson, Darin and David Hellenius. In December 2015, she performed at Turn on the Lights night concert in Amsterdam.

On 11 August 2015, Loreen revealed a new single, titled "I'm in It with You" released on 14 August 2015, and received generally positive reviews from contemporary music critics. However, the official music video, inspired by the 1979 film Over the Edge, received generally negative reviews by fans and critics. On 17 December 2015, Loreen announced her next single "Under ytan" ("Under the Surface"), a cover of the original song by Uno Svenningsson. This was her first official Swedish-language release and was available in the Nordics on 18 December and worldwide the week after. "Under ytan" received critical acclaim but was met with poor commercial reception.

=== 2016–2019: Melodifestivalen return, Nude and Ride ===
In 2016, Loreen returned to Eurovision stage when she performed at the "Eurovision The Party" event that took place at the Stockholm's Tele2 Arena on the night of the upcoming Eurovision final and was broadcast via online worldwide. During an interview in Bulgaria in 2016, Loreen stated that she and her team are working "heavily" in new music to be released later in 2016 or early 2017.

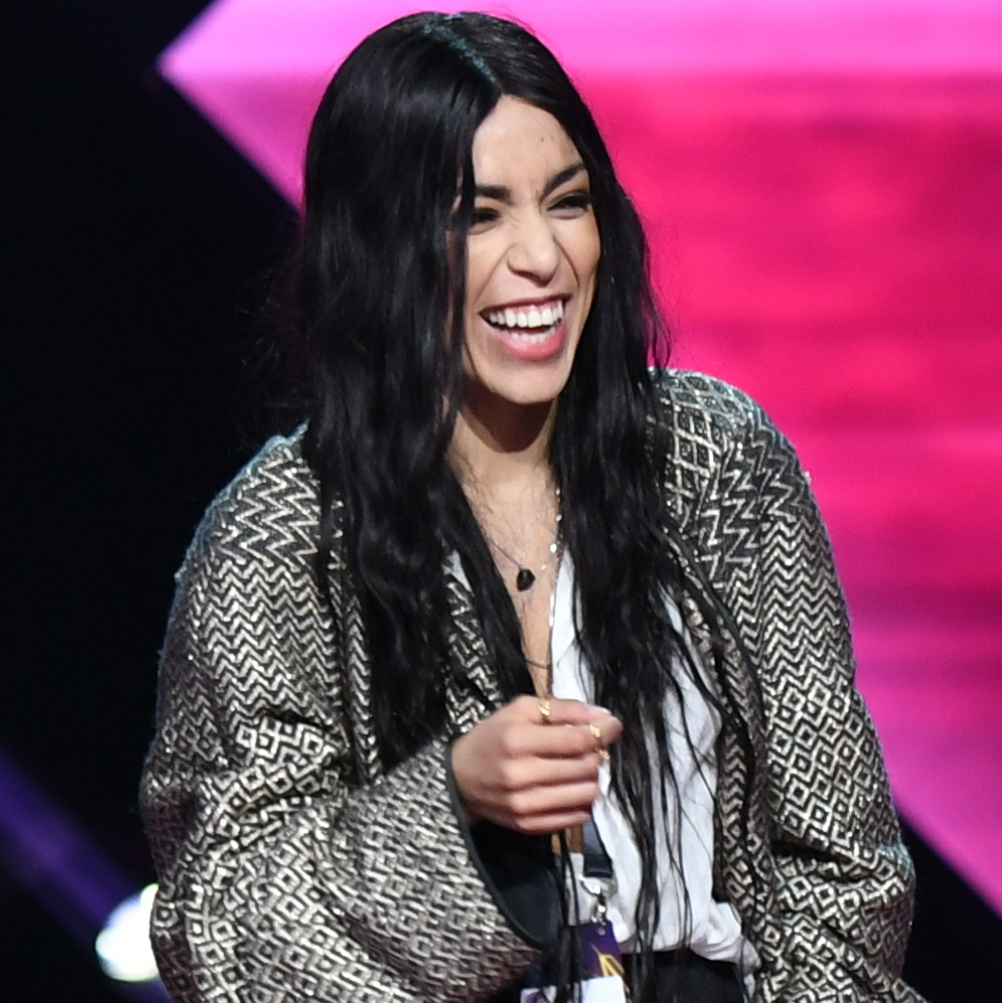
Loreen in 2017

On 30 November 2016, it was revealed that Loreen would compete in Melodifestivalen 2017 with the song "Statements" for a chance to represent Sweden again at the Eurovision Song Contest 2017. On 25 February 2017, she qualified for the Andra Chansen round, but did not qualify directly to the final from her Melodifestivalen semi-final and was put in the Andra Chansen round. After this, she lost her Andra Chansen duel against Anton Hagman and was subsequently eliminated from the competition. During interviews during Melodifestivalen, she confirmed that an EP would be released in Spring and another in Autumn. She was also signed to BMG Scandinavia under management purposes for her upcoming studio album.

On 14 July 2017, Loreen released a new single called "Body". She also revealed that "Body" was serving as lead single from her first EP Nude, which was released on 25 August 2017. On 11 August 2017, "Jungle" featuring Elliphant, was released as a second song from Nude. It was also announced that her second album would be released on 17 November 2017 with the lead single on 22 September 2017, but the first single, "71 Charger" was delayed without reason and released a week later, on 29 September 2017. The second single, "Hate The Way I Love You" was released on 27 October 2017 to critical acclaim. It was also revealed that the album would be called Ride and was released on 24 November 2017, a week behind its intentional release date.

In October 2019, Loreen released a cover of Julia Jonas' "Walk With Me" by for Ellos.

=== 2020–2024: Så mycket bättre, acting debut, Melodifestivalen and Eurovision return ===
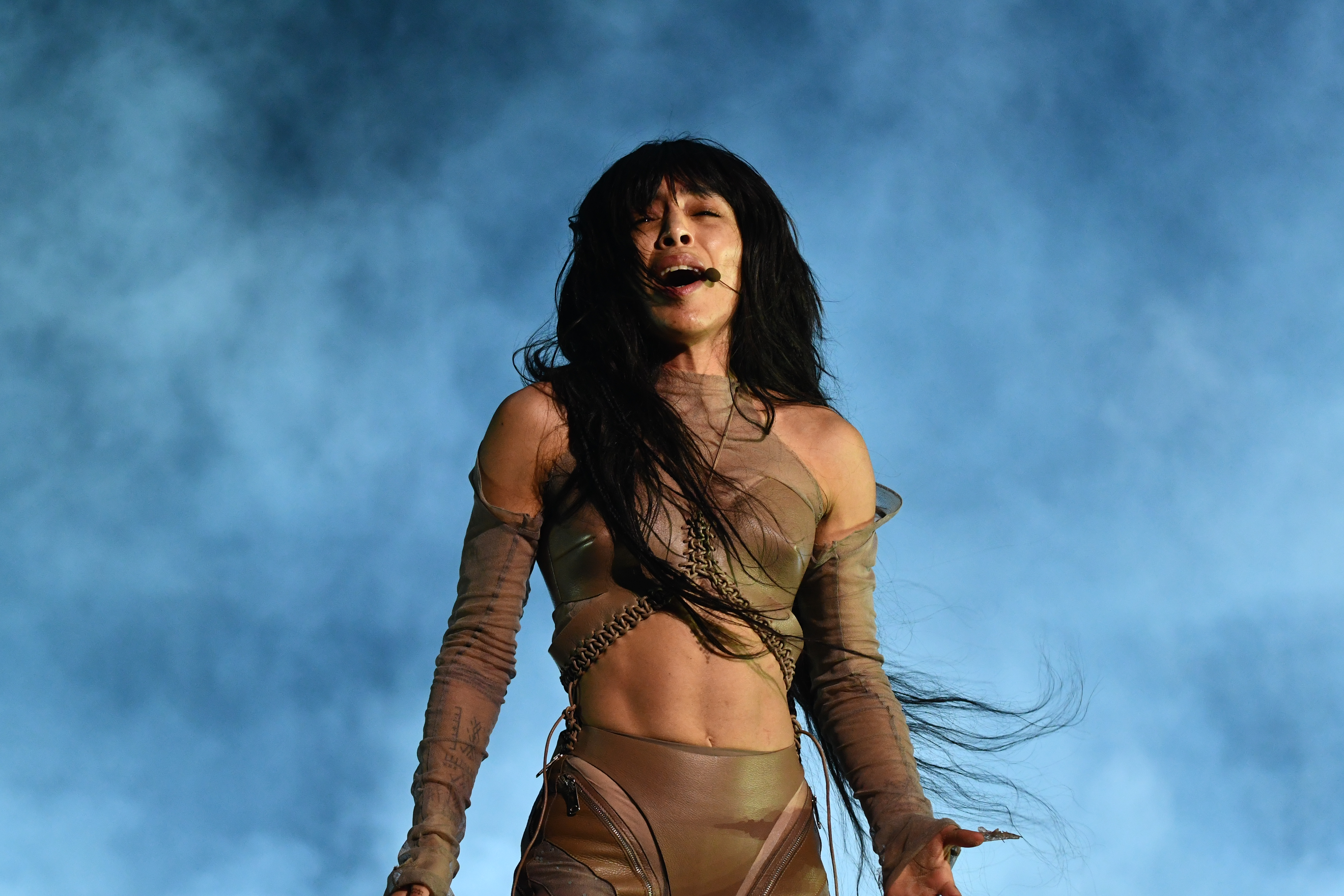
Loreen performing "Tattoo" at the Eurovision Song Contest 2023 in Liverpool

To celebrate the Melodifestivalen Hall of Fame, on 29 February 2020, Loreen performed "Fiction Feels Good", a reimagined medley of her Melodifestivalen entries to that point: "Euphoria", "My Heart Is Refusing Me" and "Statements", on the Andra Chansen show. In June 2020, she made a cameo on David Dobkin's Eurovision Song Contest: The Story of Fire Saga, along with other Eurovision winners, which premiered on Netflix. On 30 April 2020, it was announced Loreen was joining the Swedish TV show Så mycket bättre to be aired in Autumn. Songs released from the show were under her new label Universal Music Group with whom she signed with in 2020. Later in the year, it was announced she would be part of the Netflix film JJ+E to be released 8 September 2021, portraying Maria, the main character's mother.

In March 2021, Loreen released her first self-written Swedish single "Sötvattentårar", and embarked on a Swedish tour later that year. On 29 March 2022, Loreen announced a partnership with Lexus Sweden for her single "Neon Lights" as part of the Lexus NX campaign. The song was released on 13 May.

On 30 November 2022, it was announced that Loreen would compete in Melodifestivalen for a fourth time with the song "Tattoo". She participated in the fourth heat of the competition on 25 February 2023. During her performance, an environmental activist invaded the stage, which resulted in Loreen restarting her performance a few minutes later. She won the fourth heat of the competition, allowing her to progress to the final on 11 March 2023. The song was released on digital platforms that same evening. It debuted at number one in Sweden, becoming her second Swedish number one single. She later won the competition with 177 points, thus becoming the Swedish representative for the Eurovision Song Contest 2023 in Liverpool. "Tattoo" went on to win the contest with 583 points, earning Sweden its seventh Eurovision win and making Loreen the first woman and the second performer to have won the competition twice.

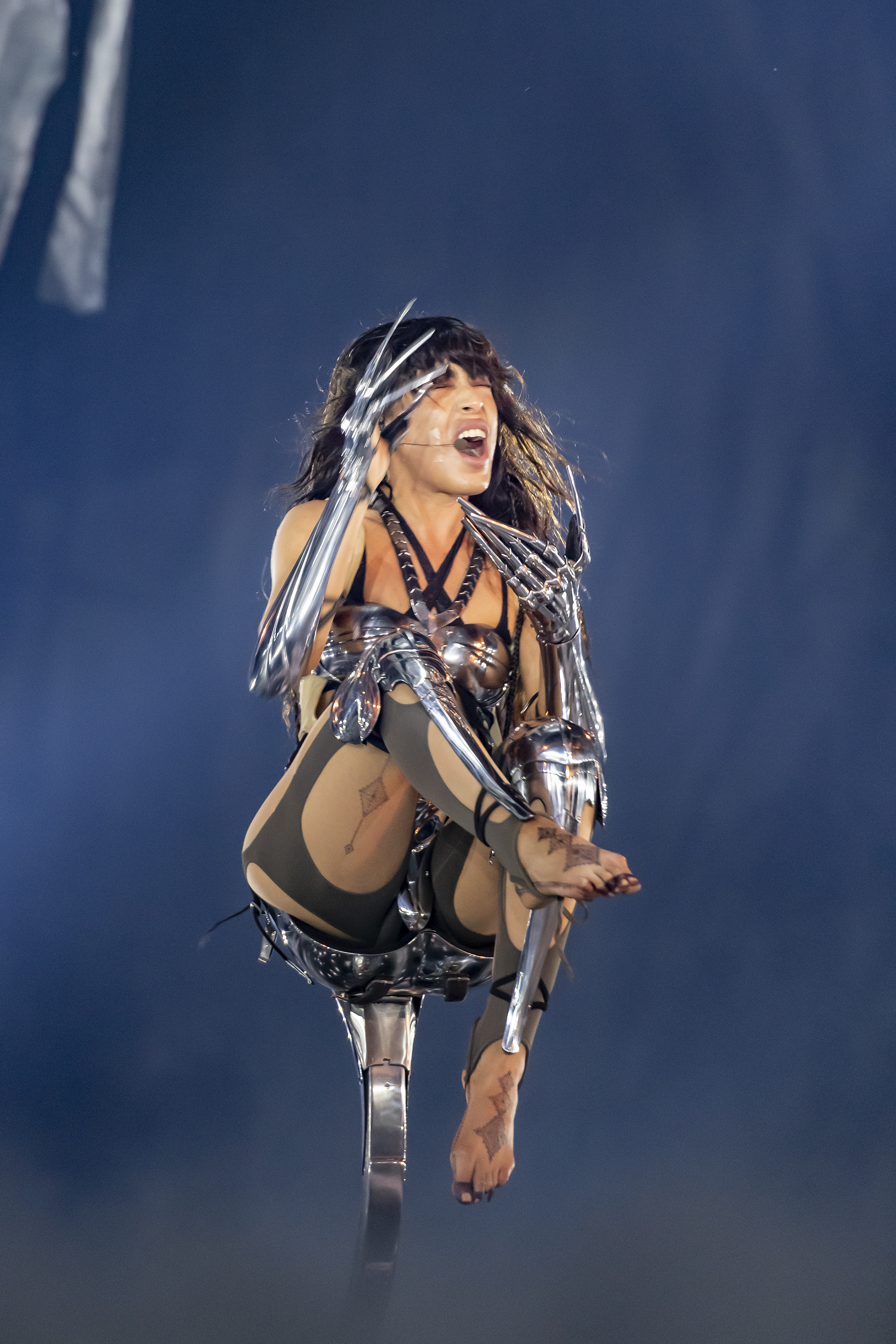
Loreen performing "Forever" at the Eurovision Song Contest 2024 in Malmö

On 1 April 2023, Loreen was a guest celebrity judge in the episode "Dragodifestivalen" of the Swedish language reality television series Drag Race Sverige broadcast on SVT1 and SVT Play. Her song "Is It Love" was released on 13 October 2023 worldwide and was produced by Swedish record producer and songwriter, Rami Yacoub. The single was the first release since she signed with her new management, TaP Music. In April 2024, she was awarded the Government's Music Export Prize by the Ministry for Foreign Affairs for her contribution to "spreading a modern and positive image of Sweden abroad". In May 2024, a European tour set to start in 2025 was announced alongside a new song "Forever" which was performed at the Eurovision 2024 Grand Final, held in Malmö, and released on 10 May 2024.

=== 2025–present: Sages and Wildfire ===
On 19 February 2025, it was announced that Loreen would release a new collaborative project titled Sages with Icelandic artist Ólafur Arnalds. The double single "In The Sound of Breathing/Opening" was released 7 March 2025 accompanied by a music video directed by Thora Hilmarsdóttir. The full EP was released 21 March 2025. A Record Store Day exclusive vinyl of the EP was released 18 April 2026. The vinyl includes a new Sages track "Echoes" and a selection of remixes.

In July 2025, it was announced that Loreen had been signed by Polydor France. Alongside the signing announcement, the single "Echoes" (Note: Her solo song Echoes is not the same as the SAGES song) was announced for release on 4 July. The single was featured in the video game Split Fiction developed by Hazelight Studios. Shortly following the release of "Echoes", Loreen released the single "Pum Pum" with David Guetta and Dimitri Vegas on 18 July.

In January 2026, Loreen's third studio album, Wildfire, was announced for release on 27 March 2026. The first single, "Feels Like Heaven", was released on 23 January. On 20 August Loreen was a guest judge on the 7th episode of Drag Race France season 4.

== Political activism ==
During the Eurovision Song Contest 2012 in Baku, Azerbaijan, Loreen was the only entrant to meet local human rights activists. She later told reporters that "human rights are violated in Azerbaijan every day. One should not be silent about such things." An Azerbaijan government spokesman responded critically, saying the contest should not "be politicised", and requested that the EBU prevent such meetings. Swedish diplomats replied that the EBU, the Swedish broadcaster SVT and Loreen had not acted against the competition's rules.

In July 2012, Loreen performed at Slavianski Bazaar in Belarus, where Belarusian president Alexander Lukashenko was in attendance. During her visit to the country, she met with the wife of political prisoner Ales Bialiatski, Viasna representatives and independent journalists, and in a two-hour meeting expressed her support of political prisoners and signed the petition to ban the death penalty in the country. Loreen later stated she was fully aware of the risks coming with "speaking out," including the possibility of being stopped or arrested at the airport when trying to return home.

In August 2013, Loreen was appointed as the ambassador of the Swedish Committee for Afghanistan. Later that year, she visited Kabul and Yaskin Bala, Afghanistan, with Minister for Foreign Affairs of Sweden, Carl Bildt, where she oversaw construction of a new school. She was later announced as a new patron of the World's Children's Prize, receiving the Crystal Globe twice for her commitment to children's rights.

In March 2022, Loreen performed at Sverige samlas och hjälper, a live fundraising gala in support of Ukraine after the Russian invasion.

== Personal life ==
Loreen was in a relationship with Idol 2004 winner Daniel Lindström between 2004 and 2006. The couple shared an apartment in Södermalm. Lindström dedicated his first music album after winning Idol to Loreen.

In early 2017, Loreen came out as bisexual. In March 2021, Loreen revealed that she had a boyfriend.

== Discography ==
=== Albums ===
- Heal (2012)
- Ride (2017)
- Wildfire (2026)

== Tours and residencies ==
=== Headlining tours ===
- Tour XIV (2014)
- Summer Tour (2021)
- The Tattoo Tour (2023)
- Tour Life (2025)
- Wildfire Tour

=== Concert residencies ===
- En Euforisk Jul (2014)

== Filmography ==
- Shrek the Third (2007) as Sleeping Beauty (Swedish dubbing)
- Barbie: Mariposa and Her Butterfly Fairy Friends (2008) as Willa (Swedish dubbing)
- The Smurfs (2011) as Smurfette (Swedish dubbing)
- Eurovision Song Contest: The Story of Fire Saga (2020)
- JJ+E (2021)
- Över Atlanten (2022)
- Drag Race Sverige (2023)
- RuPaul's Drag Race: UK vs. the World (2026) – Series 3

== Awards and nominations ==
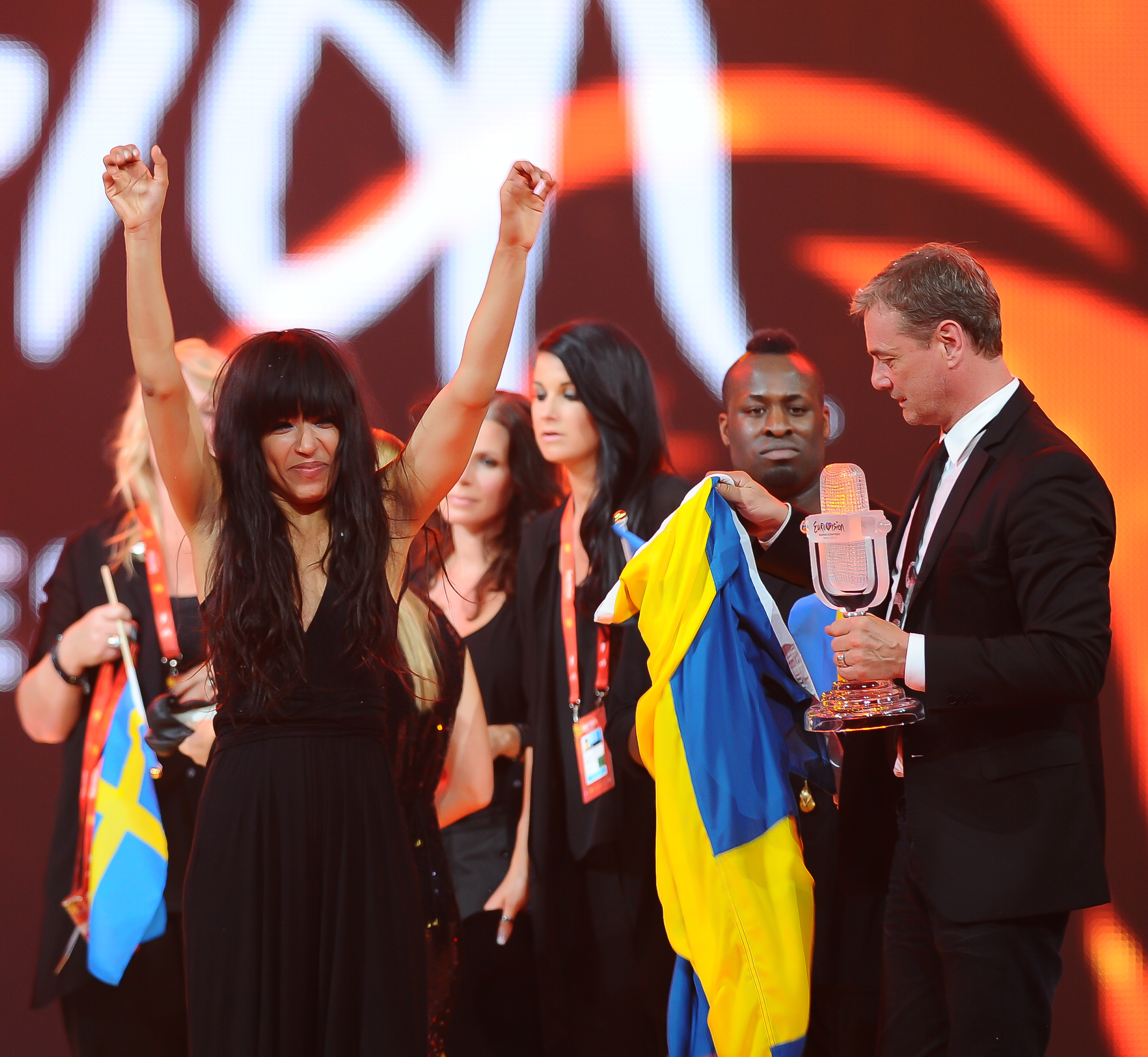
Loreen's victory in the Eurovision Song Contest 2012 in Baku

Year	Ceremony	Category	Work	Result
2012	Gaygalan Awards	Swedish Song of the Year	"My Heart Is Refusing Me"	Won
2012	Marcel Bezençon Awards	Artistic Award	Performance of "Euphoria" at Eurovision	Won
2012	Eurovision Song Contest	—N/a	"Euphoria"	1st place
2012	MTV Europe Music Awards	Best Swedish Act	Herself	Won
2012	MTV Europe Music Awards	Best European Act	Herself	Nominated
2012	Rockbjörnen	Best Female Artist	Herself	Won
2012	Rockbjörnen	Best Song	"Euphoria"	Won
2012	World Music Awards	Best Female Artist	Herself	Nominated
2012	World Music Awards	Best Entertainer of the Year	Herself	Nominated
2012	World Music Awards	Best Song	"Euphoria"	Nominated
2012	Premios 40 Principales	Mejor Canción Internacional en Lengua No Española	"Euphoria"	Nominated
2013	Grammis	Song of the Year	"Euphoria"	Nominated
2013	Grammis	Artist of the Year	Herself	Nominated
2013	Grammis	Internationally Most Successful Swedish Artist of the Year	Herself	Nominated
2013	Gaygalan Awards	Swedish Song of the Year	"Euphoria"	Won
2013	Gaygalan Awards	Artist of the Year	Herself	Nominated
2013	Radio Regenbogen Award	Listeners Award	"Euphoria"	Won
2013	Rockbjörnen	Best Live Act	"Wonk Eurovision 2013"	Nominated
2013	Rockbjörnen	Best Song	"We Got the Power"	Nominated
2013	Rockbjörnen	Best Female Artist	Herself	Nominated
2013	World Music Awards	Best Female Artist	Herself	Nominated
2013	World Music Awards	Best Artist	Herself	Nominated
2013	World Music Awards	Best Live Act	Herself	Nominated
2013	World Music Awards	Best Song	"Euphoria"	Nominated
2013	World Music Awards	Best Video	"Euphoria"	Nominated
2014	Gaygalan Awards	Swedish Song of the Year	"We Got the Power"	Nominated
2014	Spirit Music Awards	Best Album Dance/Electronic	Heal (2013 Edition)	Nominated
2014	Rockbjörnen	Best Song	"Son" (feat. Ingá-Máret Gaup-Juuso)	Nominated
2014	Rockbjörnen	Best Live Act	12 September 2013, Gröna Lund	Nominated
2014	Rockbjörnen	Best Fans	Warriors	Nominated
2014	Scandipop Awards	Best Electropop	"Requiem Solution" (with Kleerup)	Nominated
2016	Scandipop Awards	Best Female Artist	Herself	Nominated
2016	Scandipop Awards	Best Dancepop	"Paper Light (Higher)"	Nominated
2016	Scandipop Awards	Best Video	"Paper Light (Higher)"	Nominated
2016	Scandipop Awards	Most Memorable Live Performance	"Paper Light (Higher)" (Melodifestivalen 2015 interval act)	Nominated
2018	Scandipop Awards	Best Alternapop Song	"Statements"	Won
2023	Marcel Bezençon Awards	Artistic Award	Performance of "Tattoo" at Eurovision	Won
2023	Marcel Bezençon Awards	Press Award	"Tattoo"	Won
2023	Eurovision Song Contest	—N/a	"Tattoo"	1st place
2023	MTV Europe Music Awards	Best Nordic Act	Herself	Nominated
2023	NRJ Music Awards	International Breakthrough of the Year	Herself	Won
2023	NRJ Music Awards	International Song of the Year	"Tattoo"	Nominated
2023	Los 40 Music Awards 2023	Best Live Act	Herself	Nominated
2023	Los 40 Music Awards 2023	Best International Artist	Herself	Won
2023	Los 40 Music Awards 2023	Best International Song	"Tattoo"	Nominated
2024	Grammis	Artist of the Year	Herself	Nominated
2024	Grammis	Song of the Year	"Tattoo"	Nominated
2024	Government Offices of Sweden	Music Export Prize 2023	Herself	Won
2026	Electronic Dance Music Awards	DnB Song of the Year	"Pum Pum" (with Dimitri Vegas and David Guetta)	Nominated

Awards and achievements
Preceded by Swedish House Mafia	Winner of MTV EMA for Best Swedish Act; 2012	Succeeded by Avicii
Preceded by (Azerbaijan) Ell and Nikki with "Running Scared"	Winner of the Eurovision Song Contest; 2012	Succeeded by (Denmark) Emmelie de Forest with "Only Teardrops"
Preceded by (Ukraine) Kalush Orchestra with "Stefania"	Winner of the Eurovision Song Contest; 2023	Succeeded by (Switzerland) Nemo with "The Code"
Preceded by Eric Saade with "Popular"	Sweden in the Eurovision Song Contest; 2012	Succeeded by Robin Stjernberg with "You"
Preceded by Cornelia Jakobs with "Hold Me Closer"	Sweden in the Eurovision Song Contest; 2023	Succeeded by Marcus & Martinus with "Unforgettable"
