= I'm in It with You =

Single by Loreen
- Released: 14 August 2015
- Recorded: 2015
- Genre: Electropop; Europop
- Length: 4:23
- Label: Warner Music Sweden
- Songwriter(s): Lorine Talhaoui; Simen M. Eriksrud; Kiesa Ellestad; Espen Berg
- Producer(s): Simen M. Eriksrud; Espen Berg

Loreen singles chronology
"Paper Light (Higher)" (2015)	"I'm in It with You" (2015)	"Under ytan" (2015)

"I'm in It with You" is a song by Swedish singer Loreen. The song was written by Loreen, Simen M. Eriksrud, Kiesa Ellestad and Espen Berg. It was released globally as a digital download on 14 August 2015 The song did not enter the Swedish Singles Chart, but peaked to number 2 on the Sweden Heatseeker Songs.

== Background and reception ==
On 11 August 2015, Loreen announced the release of "I'm in It with You" on her Facebook page.

The song has been described as "an inspiring mid-tempo dance track where Loreen sings of being the support system of a person dear to her that is in real need of a shoulder to lean on."

On the day of release, the song impacted several national iTunes charts including Azerbaijan, Bulgaria, Czech Republic, Finland, Norway, the Netherlands, Spain and Sweden. Despite this, the song is yet to impact any official national chart.

== Live performances ==
Loren performed the song on 16 August on Sommarkrysset at Gröna Lund in Stockholm, again on 29 August on Nyhetsmorgon morning show and on 4 September on Go’kväll TV special.

== Reception ==
Reviews of "I'm In It With You" have been positive. Sopon of Wiwibloggs said the song "screamed Sia" and is "drenched in mystery and soul". Bradley Stern of MuuMuse said ""I’m In It With You" is an almighty, chill-inducing hero ballad". Scandipop said, "It's a ballad, but produced with next level drama" adding "album number 2 is shaping up to be incredible".

== Video ==
The official video clip was filmed in Stockholm, directed by Emma Hvengaard and premiered on 5 October 2015, with a total time of 4 minutes and 37 seconds. The video sees Loreen and a group of multicultural girls gather at a police station before going on to trespass onto a series of properties, vandalise cars and spraypaint houses.

=== Reception ===
The video has been met with generally negative reviews by fans and critics. Fans took to social media forums, including Twitter, Facebook and YouTube with statements of disappointment. Comments include "this is her worst video" and "this is portraying Loreen as something she is not". Scandipop said, "at times it did veer into try-hard territory when it came to its all-too-obvious aim to shock and repulse. And as a result, it just comes off as really lame." Eurovision Jack said, "I've always admired Loreen but her latest video is just a big no-no. Shame as the song is excellent."

Loreen defended the story behind the video saying it was inspired by the 1979 film, Over the Edge and recasting it with females, the video is meant to capture today’s changing world. Loreen said: "There is a new generation sick and tired of the old ones getting messed up all the time. This generation does not approve of discrimination and borders... In this gang there is one blond girl, one Portuguese and one Moroccan. They are the future... We should not believe in racism."

== Track listing ==
Digital download
No.	Title	Length
1.	"I'm in It with You"	4:23

== Charts ==
=== Weekly charts ===
Chart (2015)	Peak position
Sweden Heatseeker Songs (Sverigetopplistan)	2

== Release history ==
Region	Date	Format	Label
Worldwide	14 August 2015	Digital download	Warner Music Sweden
