= Euphoria (Loreen song) =

2012 song by Loreen

Single by Loreen

from the album Heal
- Released: 26 February 2012
- Recorded: 2012
- Genre: EDM
- Length: 3:01 (single version); 3:33 (album version)
- Label: Warner Music Sweden
- Songwriters: Thomas G:son; Peter Boström
- Producers: Peter Boström; SeventyEight

Loreen singles chronology
"Sober" (2011)	"Euphoria" (2012)	"Crying Out Your Name" (2012)

Loreen international singles chronology
"Euphoria" (2012)	"My Heart Is Refusing Me" (2012)

Audio sample
- file; help

Music video
- "Euphoria" on YouTube

Eurovision Song Contest 2012 entry
- Country: Sweden
- Artist: Loreen
- Language: English
- Composers: Thomas G:son; Peter Boström
- Lyricists: Thomas G:son; Peter Boström

Finals performance
- Semi-final result: 1st
- Semi-final points: 181
- Final result: 1st
- Final points: 372

Entry chronology
- ◄ "Popular" (2011)
- "You" (2013) ►

Official performance video
- "Euphoria" (Final) on YouTube

"Euphoria" is a song performed by Swedish singer Loreen. It was released on 26 February 2012 as the third single – first single internationally – from her debut studio album, Heal (2012). The song was written by Thomas G:son, Peter Boström and produced by Boström and SeventyEight. It represented Sweden in the Eurovision Song Contest 2012 held in Baku, Azerbaijan. It won the contest with a total of 372 points, at the time the second-highest point total in the contest's history. It received the highest number of maximum (12) points until then, with eighteen countries giving the song their top marks.

"Euphoria" received critical acclaim from most music critics. Commercially, the song was an instant success both in Sweden and in the rest of Europe. It debuted at number twelve in Loreen's home country Sweden, before reaching number one, staying there for six weeks. The song has been certified 10 times Platinum, selling 400,000 copies there. Outside of Sweden, the song peaked at number one in 16 countries across Europe, the most chart-topping positions of any Eurovision winner. The song topped the Euro Digital Songs chart weeks after the competition.

== Background ==
=== Conception ===
"Euphoria" was written by Thomas G:son and Peter Boström, and was produced by Boström and SeventyEight.

=== National Selection ===
Loreen entered "Euphoria" at the 2012 edition of the Melodifestivalen at the Vida Arena in Växjö where she performed it during the first round of the competition. She automatically advanced to the final after it was among the top 2 song entries that received the highest votes. On 10 March 2012, during the final at the Globen Arena in Stockholm, she performed the song once more while being judged by eleven international juries and voted by the Swedish people's televote. These were then combined for a final result. She eventually finished in first place, winning the competition, after receiving the highest points from both the international juries and the televoting, with a grand total of 268 points. It was reported that a record figure of more than 670,000 of the four million viewers called in to vote for her song. As that Melodifestivalen was organised by Sveriges Television (SVT) to select its song and performer for the 57th edition of the Eurovision Song Contest, the song became the Swedish entrant, and Loreen the performer, for Eurovision.

=== Eurovision ===
On 24 May 2012, the second semi-final of the Eurovision Song Contest was held in the Baku Crystal Hall in Baku hosted by İctimai Television (İTV) and broadcast live throughout the continent. Loreen performed "Euphoria" eleventh on the evening. After the grand final it was revealed that it had received in its semi-final 181 points, placing first and qualifying for the grand final. On 26 May 2012, she performed the song again in the grand final seventeenth on the evening. Both her Melodifestivalen and Eurovision performances were directed by Finnish choreographer Ambra Succi.

At the close of voting, it eventually placed first with a total of 372 points, just fifteen points shy of the (then) all-time record of 387, which is held by 2009 winner "Fairytale" by Alexander Rybak. Additionally, it broke the record for having received the most 12 points awarded by eighteen other participating countries. In total, it received points from forty of the voting forty-two countries –excluding itself–. The only country that did not award it any points was Italy.

=== Aftermath ===
On 27 May 2012, the song was performed live by the Swedish Royal Guards of the Stockholm Castle. On 9 March 2013, during the Melodifestivalen 2013 final, the song was performed by Adolf Fredrik's Music School with sign language interpretation from the Manilla School alongside Loreen, and was later made available for digital download. On 14 May 2013, they reprised this performance as the opening act of the first semi-final of the Eurovision Song Contest 2013 in Malmö.

On 31 March 2015, Loreen performed the song in the Eurovision sixtieth anniversary show Eurovision Song Contest's Greatest Hits held in London. On 7 May 2024, Johnny Logan performed the song during the first semi-final of the Eurovision Song Contest 2024 in Malmö.

== Music video ==
Television music channels initially used the Melodifestivalen 2012 performance as the official music video. Loreen later confirmed the release of an official music video. Loreen tweeted pictures from the set of the music video which was filmed on 13 June 2012. The video premiered on 5 July on Warner Music Sweden's YouTube channel. The video, filmed in a field on the outskirts of Stockholm, features Loreen dancing in a field of tall grass and eventually snow.

== Critical reception ==
Prior to the song contest, it was ranked highly on many prediction polls to win, most notably by the members of the fan organization OGAE. The song also received critical acclaim. SameSame praised the song "The heavy bangs, the steely gaze, and that icy-yet-pleading vocal performance in 'Euphoria' all set the tone for what was to complete my Loreen experience." Higher Plain Music wrote "the most straightforward dance track on the album and is still a killer track." Music journalist Deban Aderemi of wiwibloggs noted that'..Loreen's performance transcends borders. It is conceptual, yet so relatable. "Euphoria" provides the perfect template for a thousand remixes. Aderemi then goes on to award Loreen a score of 9/10. EscXtra considered that the string intro from the album version was the best part of the song while calling the song "brilliant." Erika Brooks Adickman from Idolator had described the song as "infectious". The Reflective Inklings had labelled the song as "Song of the Week". They gave it an extended review saying:

Euphoria is undoubtedly the best song of the pack that I have heard so far. It has Swedish elements sprinkled all over it. It is delicately done. The synths offer that aesthetic gloss that only makes the track go higher in terms of approval ratings. Upbeat would be a good way of describing Euphoria. Just like its predecessor (Popular), it can evoke feelings of great positivity onto its listener. Loreen shows tremendous composure in delivering those high notes. Hearing Loreen start slowly in terms of building that excitement in terms of her soon-to-be-sang high notes really got me pumped up.

On 26 May, just before the finals began, it received two Marcel Bezençon Awards: the Artistic Award presented to the best artist as voted on by the commentators, and the Composer Award for the best and most original composition as voted on by the participating composers (Thomas G:son and Peter Boström).

In 2019, Theresa Ziegler, editor-in-chief of The Gap, Austria's longest-standing pop culture magazine, wrote that "Euphoria" was the best pop song of the decade.

== Track listing ==
- CD single
1. "Euphoria" (Single version) – 3:00
2. "Euphoria" (Carli Remix version) – 5:44
3. "Euphoria" (Alex Moreno Remix version) – 6:39
4. "Euphoria" (Carli Dub version) – 5:44
5. "Euphoria" (Alex Moreno Remix radio edit) – 3:23
6. "Euphoria" (Carli Remix radio edit) – 3:50
7. "Euphoria" (Instrumental version) – 3:00
- Digital download
1. "Euphoria" (Single version) – 3:01
2. "Euphoria" (Karaoke version) – 3:01
3. "Euphoria" (Instrumental) – 2:59
- Digital EP – Remixes
1. "Euphoria" (Carli Remix version) – 5:43
2. "Euphoria" (Alex Moreno Remix version) – 6:39
3. "Euphoria" (Alex Moreno Remix radio edit) – 3:24
4. "Euphoria" (Single version) – 3:01

== Commercial performance ==
Commercially, the song was a success, not only in European markets, but also in the Australian market. In her native Sweden, the song debuted at number twelve on the Swedish Singles Chart. The song then rose to number one, where it stayed for six consecutive weeks. The song has been certified 9× platinum by GLF, selling more than 360,000 units in that country. In Finland, the song debuted at number one, and returned to number one after twelve weeks in the charts. The song debuted and spent four consecutive weeks at number one on the Danish Singles Chart. The song peaked at the top spot in several countries including Austria, Germany, Iceland, Greece and Switzerland. The song has also reached the top-ten in the Media Forest airplay charts from Israel, Moldova and Romania, peaking at number-two, three and seven respectively.

The song debuted at number eighty-five on the UK Singles Chart, where it climbed to number three the following week; this is the highest chart position for a non-UK Eurovision entry since Johnny Logan's "Hold Me Now" in 1987. The single sold 62,148 copies in its peak week in the United Kingdom. It has spent 15 consecutive weeks in the UK Top 100, and is the most downloaded Eurovision single in UK history, ahead of "Waterloo" by Sweden's ABBA and "I Can" by the United Kingdom's Blue The single has sold 500,000 copies in Germany and 2 million copies worldwide. In Australia, the song had its official debut at number thirty-six. The song also debuted at number four on the Australian Dance Charts.

=== Weekly charts ===
2012–2013 weekly chart performance for "Euphoria"
Chart (2012–2013)	Peak position
Australia (ARIA)	36
Australia (ARIA Dance Chart)	4
Austria (Ö3 Austria Top 40)	1
Belgium (Ultratop 50 Flanders)	1
Belgium (Ultratop 50 Wallonia)	14
Bulgaria Airplay (BAMP)	3
CIS Airplay (TopHit)	3
Czech Republic Airplay (ČNS IFPI)	2
Denmark (Tracklisten)	1
Euro Digital Songs (Billboard)	1
Finland (Suomen virallinen lista)	1
France (SNEP)	26
Germany (GfK)	1
Greece Digital Songs (Billboard)	1
Hungary (Rádiós Top 40)	1
Hungary (Single Top 40)	8
Iceland (RÚV)	1
Ireland (IRMA)	1
Israel Airplay (Media Forest)	2
Italy (FIMI)	27
Japan (Japan Hot 100)	98
Luxembourg (Billboard)	1
Moldova International Airplay (Media Forest)	3
Netherlands (Dutch Top 40)	2
Netherlands (Single Top 100)	2
Norway (VG-lista)	1
Poland Airplay (ZPAV)	1
Portugal Digital Songs (Billboard)	10
Romania (Romanian Top 100)	6
Russia (2M)	1
Russia Airplay (TopHit)	4
Scottish Singles Sales (Official Charts)	2
Slovakia Airplay (ČNS IFPI)	1
Slovenia (SloTop50)	34
Spain (Promusicae)	2
Sweden (Sverigetopplistan)	1
Switzerland (Schweizer Hitparade)	1
Ukraine Airplay (TopHit)	7
UK Singles (Official Charts)	3
UK Dance (Official Charts)	2

2023 weekly chart performance for "Euphoria"
Chart (2023)	Peak position
Lithuania (AGATA)	51
Poland (Polish Streaming Top 100)	94

2025 weekly chart performance for "Euphoria"
Chart (2025)	Peak position
Moldova Airplay (TopHit)	198

2026 weekly chart performance
Chart (2026)	Peak position
Norway Airplay (IFPI Norge)	100

=== Monthly charts ===
2012 monthly chart performance for "Euphoria"
Chart (2012)	Peak position
CIS Airplay (TopHit)	4
Russia Airplay (TopHit)	5
Ukraine Airplay (TopHit)	8

=== Year-end charts ===
2012 year-end chart performance for "Euphoria"
Chart (2012)	Position
Austria (Ö3 Austria Top 40)	7
Belgium (Ultratop 50 Flanders)	14
CIS Airplay (TopHit)	17
Denmark (Tracklisten)	7
Finland (Suomen virallinen lista)	1
Germany (Official German Charts)	9
Hungary (Rádiós Top 40)	19
Netherlands (Dutch Top 40)	4
Netherlands (Single Top 100)	10
Russia (2M)	18
Russia Airplay (TopHit)	18
Spain (PROMUSICAE)	9
Sweden (Sverigetopplistan)	1
Switzerland (Schweizer Hitparade)	16
Ukraine Airplay (TopHit)	26
UK Singles (OCC)	119

2013 year-end chart performance for "Euphoria"
Chart (2013)	Position
CIS Airplay (TopHit)	117
Russia Airplay (TopHit)	111

=== Decade-end charts ===
2010s decade-end chart performance for "Euphoria"
Chart (2010–2019)	Position
Ukrainian Airplay (TopHit)	175

=== Certifications ===
Region	Certification	Certified units/sales
Austria (IFPI Austria)	Platinum	30,000^{*}
Belgium (BRMA)	Gold	15,000^{*}
Denmark (IFPI Danmark)	Platinum	30,000^{^}
Finland (Musiikkituottajat)	Platinum	11,760
Germany (BVMI)	3× Gold	450,000^{^}
Italy (FIMI)	Gold	15,000^{*}
Norway (IFPI Norway)	11× Platinum	110,000^{*}
Spain (Promusicae)	Platinum	40,000^{*}
Sweden (GLF)	9× Platinum	360,000^{‡}
Sweden (GLF) Alex Moreno remix	Platinum	40,000^{‡}
Switzerland (IFPI Switzerland)	2× Platinum	60,000^{^}
United Kingdom (BPI)	Platinum	600,000^{‡}
Streaming
Denmark (IFPI Danmark)	2× Platinum	3,600,000^{†}
^{*} Sales figures based on certification alone.^{^} Shipments figures based on certification alone.^{‡} Sales+streaming figures based on certification alone.^{†} Streaming-only figures based on certification alone.

== Release history ==
Country	Date	Format	Label
Sweden	26 February 2012	Digital download	Warner Music
Italy	28 May 2012	Airplay	Warner Music
United States	29 May 2012	Digital download	Warner Music
Japan	21 November 2012	Digital download	Warner Music

== Legacy ==
- Icelandic singers Sverrir Bergmann and Halldór Gunnar recorded a cover of the song in their album of covers titled Föstudagslögin. Their version, rendered as a pop ballad, became a success in Iceland in July 2012, simultaneously with Loreen's original version. Both versions simultaneously charted on Tónlist, the official Icelandic Singles Chart. Bergmann and Gunnar's version entered the Tónlist chart 27/2012 at number 16, rising to number 5 in chart 28/2012.
- Swedish singer Helen Sjöholm covered the song during the eleventh season of the TV4 series Så mycket bättre. Helen's version, titled "Euforia", was the closing song for the show and it featured new lyrics in Swedish that were written by singer Tomas Andersson Wij. Its episode premiered on 19 December 2020.
- American singer Gavin Mikhail recorded a cover of the song for his 2012 studio album Some Die Young.
- Swedish dansband Bengt Hennings recorded a cover the song for their 2012 studio album Scenen är vår.
- Swedish power metal band Reinxeed released a cover of the song for their second compilation Swedish Hitz Goes Metal Vol II.
- Australian singer Greg Gould released an acoustic cover of the song for his EP Don't Let Go on 10 February 2017. The music video for this version features people from the LGBT community.
- German singer Nicole, winner of the Eurovision Song Contest 1982, recorded a German version of the song for her 2017 album 12 Punkte.
- On 13 November 2017, Thalía and Miriam performed the song on the third gala of the ninth season of the Spanish reality television talent competition Operación Triunfo. This cover was later performed at the Spanish tour of the popular TV show.
- On 8 May 2021, Floor Jansen performed a heavier rendition of the song during a special Eurovision edition of the Dutch reality show Beste Zangers.
- The song was covered in the sixth episode of the second season of Pørni, a Norwegian comedy series starring Henriette Steenstrup, by a band consisting of a vocalist (with banjo), an accordion and a drum.
- The song is featured on the Ubisoft dance video game Just Dance 2023 Edition as part of the Just Dance+ subscription service.
- In 2023 the song was on Drag Race Sweden, Fontana and Santana Sexmachine were the bottom 2 of the episode.
- In 2024 the song was on RuPaul's Drag Race: UK vs The World, with Hannah Conda and Tia Kofi being the top 2 of the episode.

Preceded by "Running Scared" by Ell & Nikki	Eurovision Song Contest winners 2012	Succeeded by "Only Teardrops" by Emmelie de Forest
