= X Factor (Romanian TV series) season 7 =

X Factor
- Season 7
- Hosted by: Răzvan Simion; Dani Oțil (A1)
- Judges: Delia Matache; Horia Brenciu; Ștefan Bănică, Jr. Carla's Dreams; Crina Mardare (guest)
- Winner: Jeremy Ragsdale
- Winning mentor: Horia Brenciu
- Runner-up: Ad Libitum

Release
- Original network: Antena 1
- Original release: September 10 – December 22, 2017

Season chronology
- ← Previous; Season 6 Next → Season 8

X Factor is a Romanian television music competition that aims to find a new music talent to become a star. The seventh season will started airing on 10 September 2017 on Antena 1.

The hosts are the same as in the first six seasons: Răzvan Simion and Dani Oțil, who are also known for hosting a well known morning show on Antena 1. Delia Matache, Horia Brenciu, Carla's Dreams and Ștefan Bănică, Jr. returned to the judging panel.

Jeremy Ragsdale won the competition, making Horia Brenciu's second win as a mentor.

== Judges ==
- Delia Matache

Delia Matache is a famous Romanian eurobeat singer-songwriter, TV celebrity, dancer, philanthropist, former model, fashion designer. She has started her stage music activity in 1999 in N&D music band with Nicolae Marin and had released 4 albums, and after the split off in 2003 she had released another two solo albums.

- Horia Brenciu

Horia Brenciu is a Romanian singer, television host for the Romanian version of Dancing with the Stars, successful entertainer, and philanthropist. He studied at National College Andrei Şaguna from Braşov, then he continued to Şcoala Populară de Artă Braşov, at piano and canto class, and in 1998 he graduated The Theater Academy in Bucharest.

- Ștefan Bănică, Jr.

Ștefan Bănică, Jr. is a Romanian entertainer, of Roma people origin on his father side, TV presenter, one of the most important Romanian TV personality, the son of actor Ștefan Bănică. He is well known in Romanian for presenting the Romanian version of “Dancing with the Stars”, the largest dance competition ever aired in Romania, broadcast on Pro TV.

- Carla's Dreams

Carla's Dreams is a Moldavian musical project which was initiated by Dobra Robert in 2012. The band is an anonymous group of singers and composers who sing in Romanian, Russian and English. During concerts the band's vocalist wears hood, sunglasses and a masked to hide his identity.

Established in Chișinău, Carla's Dreams combines several musical styles, including hip hop, jazz, rock and pop. The first song produced by Carla's Dreams was Dă-te ("Get Off"). Carla's Dreams has launched in Romania in 2013, along with Inna with the song P.O.H.U.I., later to sing with Loredana "Lumea Ta" ("Your World"), and in 2015 with Delia, releasing songs "Cum Ne Noi" ("How We Us") and "Da, Mamă" ("Yes, Mother").

== Auditions ==
Cities that auditions and/or pre-auditions were held in.

Audition process was based on the British and American version. First up were "The Producer's Audition", where the producers chose singers to proceed to the second phase which was "The Audition before the Judging panel".

Summary of auditions
City	Auditions date
Craiova	May 5, 2017
Arad	May 7, 2017
Cluj Napoca	May 9, 2017
Sibiu	May 12, 2017
Iași	May 14, 2017
Galați	May 17, 2017
Chișinău	May 18, 2017
Bucharest	May 21, 2017

The auditions were broadcast from 8 September 2017 until 17 November 2017. The auditions consisted in 11 episodes.

== Bootcamp ==
This season, there will be four categories : Boys (14–24 years), Girls (14–24 years), Over 24s and the Groups.

Brenciu will mentor the Over 24s, Bănică the Boys, Carla's Dream the Groups and Matache will mentor the Girls.

Complete Teams

Color key
– Eliminated in Four-chair challenge
– Eliminated in Duels
– Finalist
– Wildcard

Category (mentor)	Top 41 acts					
Boys (Bănică)	Anton Banaghan	Pierluca Salvatore	Alin Buruiană	Gabriel Haralambie	Viorel Grecu	Cristian Porcari
Boys (Bănică)	Sebastian Hădărean	Lilian Dobândă	Simone Venditti	Radu Mitrea		
Girls (Matache)	Alina Mocanu	Teodora Sava	Ioana Mîrți	Francesca Nicolescu	Costina Crăciun	Ana Nica Văcari
Girls (Matache)	Isabela Chitoșcă	Ioana Savu	Narcisa Stănescu	Mikayla Kachur	Geanina Mîndrescu	
Over 24s (Brenciu)	Katerina Biehu	Jeremy Ragsdale	Alexandra Crăescu	Vlad Gliga	Armando Drăgan	Georgi Simeonov
Over 24s (Brenciu)	Cristi Nistor	Maria Gogu	Miruna Ionescu	Mike Obinna		
Groups (Carla's)	Ad Libitum	Flashback	18:27	Dream Girls	X Fusion	Daudia
Groups (Carla's)	Random	Artizan	Debu & Vasâi	Denisa & Rebeca		

=== Four-chair challenge ===
This season, the categories will face the four-chair challenge. From the 41 acts competing (the Girls category had an extra act), at the end of this round, only 16 acts will go further in the competition.

The four-chair challenge were broadcast from 23 November 2017 until 7 December 2017. This consisted in 4 episodes, one for each group.

Color key
– Contestant was immediately eliminated after performance without switch
– Contestant was switched out later in the competition and eventually eliminated
– Contestant was not switched out and made the final four of their own category

Contestants performances on the four-chair challenge
Episode	Category (mentor)	Act	Order	Song	Mentor's decision	Switched with
Episode 12 (23 November)	Boys (Bănică)	Radu Mitrea	1	"Shape of You"	Eliminated	—N/a
Episode 12 (23 November)	Boys (Bănică)	Alin Buruiană	2	"Ave Maria"	Put in chair 1	—
Episode 12 (23 November)	Boys (Bănică)	Cristian Porcari	3	"Let Her Go"	Put in chair 2	Viorel Grecu
Episode 12 (23 November)	Boys (Bănică)	Anton Banaghan	4	"Say You Won't Let Go"	Put in chair 3	—
Episode 12 (23 November)	Boys (Bănică)	Simone Venditti	5	"I Believe I Can Fly "	Eliminated	—N/a
Episode 12 (23 November)	Boys (Bănică)	Gabriel Haralambie	6	"A Song for You"	Put in chair 4	—
Episode 12 (23 November)	Boys (Bănică)	Lilian Dobândă	7	"Too Close"	Eliminated	—N/a
Episode 12 (23 November)	Boys (Bănică)	Sebastian Hădărean	8	"Cine Ești?"	Eliminated	—N/a
Episode 12 (23 November)	Boys (Bănică)	Viorel Grecu	9	"1000 RPM"	Put in chair 2	Pierluca Salvatore
Episode 12 (23 November)	Boys (Bănică)	Pierluca Salvatore	10	"A Sky Full of Stars"	Put in chair 2	—
Episode 13 (24 November)	Girls (Delia)	Alina Mocanu ^{1}	1	"All I Could Do Was Cry"	Put in chair 3	Teodora Sava
Episode 13 (24 November)	Girls (Delia)	Geanina Mîndrescu	2	"Attention"	Eliminated	—N/a
Episode 13 (24 November)	Girls (Delia)	Mikayla Kachur	3	"Je veux"	Eliminated	—N/a
Episode 13 (24 November)	Girls (Delia)	Costina Crăciun	4	"Chain of Fools"	Put in chair 2	Francesca Nicolescu
Episode 13 (24 November)	Girls (Delia)	Ana Nica Văcari	5	"Tired"	Put in chair 3	Alina Mocanu
Episode 13 (24 November)	Girls (Delia)	Narcisa Stănescu	6	"Bang Bang"	Eliminated	—N/a
Episode 13 (24 November)	Girls (Delia)	Ioana Savu	7	"Rug"	Put in chair 4	Ioana Mîrți
Episode 13 (24 November)	Girls (Delia)	Ioana Mîrți	8	"When We Were Young"	Put in chair 4	—
Episode 13 (24 November)	Girls (Delia)	Teodora Sava	9	"Firework"	Put in chair 1	—
Episode 13 (24 November)	Girls (Delia)	Isabela Chitoșcă	10	"Sweet Talker"	Eliminated	—N/a
Episode 13 (24 November)	Girls (Delia)	Francesca Nicolescu	11	"Jealous"	Put in chair 2	—
Episode 14 (1 December)	Over 24s (Brenciu)	Cristi Nistor	1	"I Don't Want To Miss A Thing"	Put in chair 1	Jeremy Ragsdale
Episode 14 (1 December)	Over 24s (Brenciu)	Georgi Simeonov	2	"I Can't Make You Love Me"	Put in chair 2	Alexandra Crăescu
Episode 14 (1 December)	Over 24s (Brenciu)	Maria Gogu	3	"Irreplaceable"	Put in chair 3	Katerina Biehu
Episode 14 (1 December)	Over 24s (Brenciu)	Mike Obinna	4	"Wake Me Up"	Put in chair 4	Vlad Gliga
Episode 14 (1 December)	Over 24s (Brenciu)	Vlad Gliga	5	"Dancing on My Own"	Put in chair 4	—
Episode 14 (1 December)	Over 24s (Brenciu)	Miruna Ionescu	6	"Sunt vagabondul vieții mele"	Eliminated	—N/a
Episode 14 (1 December)	Over 24s (Brenciu)	Katerina Biehu	7	"If I Were a Boy"	Put in chair 3	—
Episode 14 (1 December)	Over 24s (Brenciu)	Jeremy Ragsdale	8	"I Have Nothing"	Put in chair 1	—
Episode 14 (1 December)	Over 24s (Brenciu)	Alexandra Crăescu	9	"One"	Put in chair 2	—
Episode 14 (1 December)	Over 24s (Brenciu)	Armando Drăgan	10	"Paradise"	Eliminated	—N/a
Episode 15 (7 December)	Groups (Carla's)	Artizan	1	"Like I'm Gonna Lose You"	Put in chair 1	Ad Libitum
Episode 15 (7 December)	Groups (Carla's)	Denisa & Rebeca	2	"Million Reasons"	Eliminated	—N/a
Episode 15 (7 December)	Groups (Carla's)	18:27	3	"Beggin'"	Put in chair 2	—
Episode 15 (7 December)	Groups (Carla's)	Daudia	4	"All of Me"	Put in chair 3	Flashback
Episode 15 (7 December)	Groups (Carla's)	Random	5	"Bird Set Free"	Put in chair 4	X Fusion
Episode 15 (7 December)	Groups (Carla's)	Debu & Văsâi^{2}	6	"Thinking Out Loud"	Eliminated	—N/a
Episode 15 (7 December)	Groups (Carla's)	Ad Libitum	7	"That's Amore"	Put in chair 1	—
Episode 15 (7 December)	Groups (Carla's)	X Fusion	8	"Addicted to You"	Put in chair 4	Dream Girls
Episode 15 (7 December)	Groups (Carla's)	Flashback	9	""/"Radioactive"	Put in chair 3	—
Episode 15 (7 December)	Groups (Carla's)	Dream Girls	10	"Little Me"	Put in chair 4	—

Notes

1. The act Alina Mocanu was switched with Teodora Sava and therefore eliminated. After the performance of Isabela Chitoșcă, Delia decided to recall Alina Mocanu in the competition, stating she has made a mistake, concluding with Ana Nica Văcari elimination.
2. The act Debu & Văsâi was offered a chair, but due to Debu's response when asked if they want a chair ("I don't care"), Carla's decided to eliminate them.

=== Duels ===
At the end of this round there will be 8 acts remaining, two for each category. The duels were broadcast on 8 December 2017.

Colour key:

- Artist won the Duel and advanced to the Live shows

- Artist lost the Duel and was eliminated

Contestants performances on the duels challenge
Episode	Category (mentor)	Duel	Act	Order	Song	Result
Episode 16 (8 December)	Boys (Bănică)	Duel 1	Pierluca Salvatore	1	"Writing's on the Wall"	Finalist
Episode 16 (8 December)	Boys (Bănică)	Duel 1	Alin Buruiană	2	"Copacul"	Eliminated
Episode 16 (8 December)	Boys (Bănică)	Duel 2	Anton Banaghan	9	"Supermarket Flowers"	Finalist
Episode 16 (8 December)	Boys (Bănică)	Duel 2	Gabriel Haralambie	10	"Hero	Eliminated
Episode 16 (8 December)	Girls (Matache)	Duel 1	Teodora Sava	11	"The Voice Within"	Finalist
Episode 16 (8 December)	Girls (Matache)	Duel 1	Alina Mocanu	12	"All I Ask"	Finalist
Episode 16 (8 December)	Girls (Matache)	Duel 2	Francesca Nicolescu	3	"Lay Me Down"	Eliminated
Episode 16 (8 December)	Girls (Matache)	Duel 2	Ioana Mîrți	4	"Eyes Shut"	Eliminated
Episode 16 (8 December)	Over 24s (Brenciu)	Duel 1	Katerina Biehu	7	"Skin"	Finalist
Episode 16 (8 December)	Over 24s (Brenciu)	Duel 1	Alexandra Crăescu	8	"All by Myself"	Eliminated
Episode 16 (8 December)	Over 24s (Brenciu)	Duel 2	Vlad Gliga	15	"Love My Life"	Eliminated
Episode 16 (8 December)	Over 24s (Brenciu)	Duel 2	Jeremy Ragsdale	16	"Rolling in the Deep"	Finalist
Episode 16 (8 December)	Groups (Carla's)	Duel 1	Ad Libitum	13	"Nunta"	Finalist
Episode 16 (8 December)	Groups (Carla's)	Duel 1	Flashback	14	"Numb/Encore"	Finalist
Episode 16 (8 December)	Groups (Carla's)	Duel 2	18:27	5	"Human"	Eliminated
Episode 16 (8 December)	Groups (Carla's)	Duel 2	Dream Girls	6	"Single Ladies (Put a Ring on It)"	Eliminated

=== Wildcard ===
In this season, like season 6, the public will have the chance to save one of the acts that competed in the Auditions. The most voted act will go directly to the Live Shows. In the first live show if one of the mentor decides to take him in his team, then he will go further in the competition, otherwise he will be sent home.

The winner of this season selected by the public was Francesca Nicolescu, from the Girls Category.

== Finalists ==
The nine finalists will compete in the Live Shows.

Color Key
– Winner
– Runner-up
– Third place

Category (mentor)	Acts		
Boys (Bănică)	Anton Banaghan	Pierluca Salvatore	
Girls (Matache)	Alina Mocanu	Francesca Nicolescu	Teodora Sava
Over 24s (Brenciu)	Katerina Biehu	Jeremy Ragsdale	
Groups (Carla's)	Ad Libitum	Flashback	

== Live shows ==
=== Results summary ===
Color key

–	Contestant was announced as the winner.
–	Contestant has returned in the competition.
–	Contestant was not saved by its mentor and had to sing again in the duel.
–	Contestant received the fewest public votes and was immediately eliminated, no duel.

Live shows results per contestant
Contestant	Live Show 1		Live Show 2		Live Show 3	
Contestant	Wildcard	Elimination	Round 1	Round 2	Round 1	Round 2
Jeremy Ragsdale	—N/a	Safe	Safe	Safe	Safe	Winner
Ad Libitum	—N/a	Duel	Safe	Safe	Safe	Runner-Up
Francesca Nicolescu	Returned Gala 1	Duel	Safe	Safe	3rd	Eliminated (Gala 3)
Pierluca Salvatore	—N/a	Duel	Safe	Safe	4th	Eliminated (Gala 3)
Anton Banaghan	—N/a	Safe	Safe	5th	Eliminated (Gala 2)	
Teodora Sava	—N/a	Safe	Safe	6th	Eliminated (Gala 2)	
Flashback	—N/a	Safe	7th	Eliminated (Gala 2)		
Katerina Biehu	—N/a	8th	Eliminated (Gala 1)			
Alina Mocanu	—N/a	9th	Eliminated (Gala 1)			
Brenciu's vote to save	None	Ragsdale	None			
Matache's vote to save	None	Sava	None			
Bănică's vote to save	None	Banaghan	None			
Carla's vote to save	None	Flashback	None			
Eliminated	None	Alina Mocanu by public vote	Flashback by public vote	Teodora Sava by public vote	Pierluca Salvatore by public vote	Ad Libitum by public vote
Eliminated	None	Katerina Biehu by public vote	Flashback by public vote	Anton Banaghan by public vote	Francesca Nicolescu by public vote	Jeremy Ragsdale by public vote
Reference(s)						

=== Live show details ===
==== Live Show 1–15 December 2017 ====
Contestants' performances on the first live show
Act	Order	Song	Result
Francesca Nicolescu	1	"(You Make Me Feel Like) A Natural Woman"	Duel
Anton Banaghan	2	"Zece"	Safe
Pierluca Salvatore	3	"The House of the Rising Sun"	Duel
Katerina Biehu	4	"I'd Rather Go Blind"	Duel
Jeremy Ragsdale	5	"It's a Man's Man's Man's World"	Safe
Ad Libitum	6	"Can't Help Falling in Love"	Duel
Flashback	7	"Stressed Out"	Safe
Alina Mocanu	8	"Bird Set Free"	Duel
Teodora Sava	9	"Purple Rain"	Safe
Duel details
Alina Mocanu	1	"Figures"	Eliminated
Pierluca Salvatore	2	"Hold Back the River"	Safe
Ad Libitum	3	"Adagio"	Safe
Francesca Nicolescu	4	"People Help the People"	Safe
Katerina Biehu	5	"Nici o stea"	Eliminated

==== Live Show 2: Semifinal - 17 December 2017 ====
Contestants' performances on the second live show
Act	Order	Song	Result
Round 1
Teodora Sava	1	"Listen"	Safe
Flashback	2	"Written in the Stars"	Eliminated
Anton Banaghan	3	"Who You Are"	Safe
Jeremy Ragsdale	4	"Tu eşti primăvara mea"	Safe
Pierluca Salvatore	5	"Recovery"	Safe
Francesca Nicolescu	6	"I Am Changing"	Safe
Ad Libitum	7	"Perfect"	Safe
Round 2
Teodora Sava	1	"Alive"	Eliminated
Jeremy Ragsdale	2	"Unchained Melody"	Safe
Anton Banaghan	3	"Tears in Heaven"	Eliminated
Francesca Nicolescu	4	"Joyful, Joyful"	Safe
Ad Libitum	5	"Nessun dorma"	Safe
Pierluca Salvatore	6	"Caruso"	Safe

==== Live Show 3: Final - 22 December 2017 ====
===== Round 1 =====
- Theme: Duet with special guest and with their mentor

Contestants' performances on the third live show
Act	Order	First Song (duet with special guest)	Order	Second Song (duet with mentor)	Result
Ad Libitum	1	"A fost o nebunie" (with Alina Eremia)	8	"Sub Pielea Mea (#Eroina)" (with Carla's Dreams)	Safe
Pierluca Salvatore	2	"Runnin' (Lose It All)" (with Nicoleta Nucă)	5	"Imagine" (with Ștefan Bănică Jr.)	4th place
Jeremy Ragsdale	3	"I Got You (I Feel Good)" (with Santa Claus )	7	"What a Wonderful World " (with Horia Brenciu)	Safe
Francesca Nicolescu	4	"Smells Like Teen Spirit " (with Liviu Teodorescu)	6	"Mulțumesc, iubită mamă" (with Delia Matache)	3rd place

===== Round 2 =====
- Theme: Final

Contestants' performances on the final live show
Act	Order	Song	Result
Ad Libitum	1	"Bohemian Rhapsody"	Runner-Up
Jeremy Ragsdale	2	"When a Man Loves a Woman"	Winner

== Ratings ==
Ep	Title	Date	National		Urban		18–49		Source
Ep	Title	Date	Average (thousands)	Rating (%)	Average (thousands)	Rating (%)	Average (thousands)	Rating (%)	Source
1	Auditions 1	10 September 2017	1 048	5.8	646	6.6	300	13.1	
2	Auditions 2	15 September 2017	890	5.0	481	4.9	250	5.6	
3	Auditions 3	22 September 2017	1 116	6.2	542	5.6	301	6.7	
4	Auditions 4	29 September 2017	967	5.4	557	5.7	291	6.4	
5	Auditions 5	6 October 2017	1 091	6.1	570	5.9	298	6.6	
6	Auditions 6	13 October 2017	925	5.1	484	5.0	257	5.7	
7	Auditions 7	20 October 2017	1 106	6.1	602	6.2	319	7.1	
8	Auditions 8	27 October 2017	1 066	5.9	608	6.2	316	7.0	
9	Auditions 9	3 November 2017	1 027	5.7	568	5.8	314	7.0	
10	Auditions 10	10 November 2017	906	5.0	468	4.8	263	5.9	
11	Auditions 11	17 November 2017	826	5.0	480	4.9	261	5.8	
12	Four-chair Challenge 1	23 November 2017	Unknown						
13	Four-chair Challenge 2	24 November 2017	943	5.2	531	5.5	289	6.4	
14	Four-chair Challenge 3	1 December 2017	787	4.4	429	4.5	235	5.3	
15	Four-chair Challenge 4	7 December 2017							
16	The Duels	8 December 2017							
17	Live Show 1	15 December 2017							
18	Live Show 2	17 December 2017							
19	Live Show 3	22 December 2017							
