= X Factor (Romanian TV series) season 5 =

X Factor
- Season 5
- Hosted by: Răzvan Simion; Dani Oțil (A1)
- Judges: Delia Matache; Horia Brenciu; Ștefan Bănică, Jr.
- Winner: Florin Răduţă
- Winning mentor: Ștefan Bănică, Jr.
- Runner-up: Xenia Chitoroagă

Release
- Original network: Antena 1
- Original release: September 17 – December 27, 2015

Season chronology
- ← Previous; Season 4 Next → Season 6

X Factor is a Romanian television music competition that aims to find a new music talent to become a star. The fifth season will start airing on 17 September 2015 on Antena 1.

The hosts are the same as in the first four seasons: Răzvan Simion and Dani Oțil, who are also known for hosting a well known morning show on Antena 1. Delia Matache, Horia Brenciu and Ștefan Bănică, Jr. returned to the judging panel.

On December 27, 2015, the season concluded and was won by Florin Răduţă, mentored by Bănică. Xenia Chitoroagă, mentored also by Bănică finished in second place.

== Judges ==
- Delia Matache

Delia Matache is a famous Romanian Eurobeat singer-songwriter, TV celebrity, dancer, philanthropist, former model, fashion designer. She has started her stage music activity in 1999 in N&D music band with Nicolae Marin and had released 4 albums, and after the split off in 2003 she had released another two solo albums.

- Horia Brenciu

Horia Brenciu is a Romanian singer, television host for the Romanian version of Dancing with the Stars, successful entertainer, and philanthropist. He studied at National College Andrei Şaguna from Braşov, then he continued to Şcoala Populară de Artă Braşov, at piano and canto class, and in 1998 he finished The Theater Academy in Bucharest.

- Ștefan Bănică, Jr.

Ștefan Bănică, Jr. is a Romanian entertainer, of roma people origin from his father side, TV presenter, one of the most important Romanian TV personality, the son of actor Ștefan Bănică. He is well known in Romanian for presenting the Romania version of "Dancing with the Stars", the most longevive dance competition ever aired in Romania, broadcast on Pro TV.

== Auditions ==
Cities that auditions and/or pre-auditions were held in.

Audition process was based on the British and American version. First up were "The Producer's Audition", where the producers chose singers to proceed to the second phase which was "The Audition before the Judging panel". The first auditions took place at Craiova, on 26 April 2015. They then took place in Sibiu, on 28 April, in Arad, on April 30, in Cluj Napoca on May 2, 2015, on May 5 in Iași, on May 8 in Galați, May 10 in Bucharest and concluded on May 16, 2015, in Chișinău, Moldova.

Summary of auditions
City	Auditions date	Venue
Craiova	April 26, 2015	Craiova University
Sibiu	April 28, 2015	
Arad	April 30, 2015	Hotel Parc
Cluj Napoca	May 2, 2015	Iulius Mall
Iași	May 5, 2015	Palas Mall
Galați	May 8, 2015	Hotel Faleza By Vega
Bucharest	May 10, 2015	Children's Palace
Chișinău	May 16, 2015	

The auditions were broadcast from 17 September 2015 until 20 November 2015. The auditions consisted in 11 episodes.

== Bootcamp ==
This season, the categories follow the age-based format from the past two seasons. The judges learnt which category they will mentor after the Auditions 11. Brenciu will mentor the Groups, Bănică the Under 20s and for the second time, Matache will mentor the Over 20s.

Complete Teams

Color key
– Eliminated in Six-chair challenge
– Eliminated in Duels
– Finalist
– Wildcard

Category (mentor)	Top 42 acts						
Under 20s (Bănică)	Florin Răduţă	Endy Glikman	Erika Isac	Mădălina Căuş	Xenia Chitoroagă	Paul Bătinaş	Emanuel Varga
Under 20s (Bănică)	Antinia Simion	Afina Madoian	Dumitru Charbel	Teodora Constantin	Edina Bodor	Zuo Dragomirescu	Daniela Stoica
Groups (Brenciu)	B52	Bravissimo	Tomato	Brain Band	Twins	Tea Rock	Trupa Maria
Groups (Brenciu)	Deea & George	Uptown	Hello	Grupul Vera	Divas	Eleven	Hip
Over 20s (Matache)	Andrei Ioniță	Anastasia Ursu	Alex Vasilache	Dana Markitan	Randy Roberts	Sasha Călinescu	Andrei Ciobanu
Over 20s (Matache)	Mirko Oliva	Gabriela Lazăr	Nicoleta Mihăilă	Natalie Merchant	George Secioreanu	Daniela Rogovschi	Alexandru Petcu

=== Six-chair challenge ===
Like last season, the stage called "The Six-Chair challenge" will be back. This season, the categories follow the age-based format from season four. From the 42 acts competing, at the end of this round, only 18 acts will go further in the competition.

The Six-Chair Challenge consisted in three editions that were broadcast on November 27, December 4 and December 9, 2015.

Color key
– Contestant was immediately eliminated after performance without switch
– Contestant was switched out later in the competition and eventually eliminated
– Contestant was not switched out and made the final six of their own category

Contestants performances on the six-chair challenge
Episode	Category (mentor)	Act	Order	Song	Mentor's decision	Switched with
Episode 12 (November 27)	Under 20s (Bănică)	Paul Bătinaş	1	"I Can't Make You Love Me"	Put in chair 1	—
Episode 12 (November 27)	Under 20s (Bănică)	Daniela Stoica	2	"At Last"	Eliminated	—N/a
Episode 12 (November 27)	Under 20s (Bănică)	Afina Madoian	3	"Girl on Fire"	Put in chair 2	Florin Răduţă
Episode 12 (November 27)	Under 20s (Bănică)	Dumitru Charbel	4	"All of Me"	Put in chair 3	Erika Isac
Episode 12 (November 27)	Under 20s (Bănică)	Antinia Simion	5	"Lost"	Put in chair 4	Mădălina Căuş
Episode 12 (November 27)	Under 20s (Bănică)	Zuo Dragomirescu	6	"I Won't Give Up on You"	Eliminated	—N/a
Episode 12 (November 27)	Under 20s (Bănică)	Xenia Chitoroagă	7	"Can't Help Falling in Love"	Put in chair 5	—
Episode 12 (November 27)	Under 20s (Bănică)	Edina Bodor	8	"Blank Page"	Eliminated	—N/a
Episode 12 (November 27)	Under 20s (Bănică)	Teodora Constantin	9	"We Found Love"	Eliminated	—N/a
Episode 12 (November 27)	Under 20s (Bănică)	Emanuel Varga	10	"You Are Not Alone"	Put in chair 6	Endy Glikman
Episode 12 (November 27)	Under 20s (Bănică)	Erika Isac	11	"Don't Speak"	Put in chair 3	—
Episode 12 (November 27)	Under 20s (Bănică)	Florin Răduţă	12	"How Am I Supposed to Live Without You"	Put in chair 2	—
Episode 12 (November 27)	Under 20s (Bănică)	Mădălina Căuş	13	"Bésame Mucho"	Put in chair 4	—
Episode 12 (November 27)	Under 20s (Bănică)	Endy Glikman	14	"I'm Not the Only One"	Put in chair 6	—
Episode 13 (December 4)	Over 20s (Matache)	Gabriela Lazăr	1	"Habits (Stay High)"	Put in chair 1	Sasha Călinescu
Episode 13 (December 4)	Over 20s (Matache)	Natalie Merchant	2	"If I Were a Boy"	Put in chair 2	Andrei Ioniță
Episode 13 (December 4)	Over 20s (Matache)	Alexandru Petcu	3	"Locul Potrivit"	Eliminated	—N/a
Episode 13 (December 4)	Over 20s (Matache)	Daniela Rogovschi	4	"Believe"	Eliminated	—N/a
Episode 13 (December 4)	Over 20s (Matache)	George Secioreanu	5	"Je t'aime"	Eliminated	—N/a
Episode 13 (December 4)	Over 20s (Matache)	Anastasia Ursu	6	"Love Me like You Do"	Put in chair 3	—
Episode 13 (December 4)	Over 20s (Matache)	Dana Markitan	7	"Over the Rainbow"	Put in chair 4	—
Episode 13 (December 4)	Over 20s (Matache)	Randy Roberts	8	"When I Was Your Man"	Put in chair 5	—
Episode 13 (December 4)	Over 20s (Matache)	Nicoleta Mihăilă	9	"Read All About It"	Put in chair 6	Alex Vasilache
Episode 13 (December 4)	Over 20s (Matache)	Andrei Ioniță	10	"Lume, lume, soro lume"	Put in chair 2	—
Episode 13 (December 4)	Over 20s (Matache)	Alex Vasilache	11	"You Are So Beautiful"	Put in chair 6	—
Episode 13 (December 4)	Over 20s (Matache)	Sasha Călinescu	12	"Born This Way"	Put in chair 1	—
Episode 13 (December 4)	Over 20s (Matache)	Mirko Oliva	13	"I See Fire"	Eliminated	—N/a
Episode 13 (December 4)	Over 20s (Matache)	Andrei Ciobanu	14	"It's My Life"	Eliminated	—N/a
Episode 14 (December 9)	Groups (Brenciu)	Hello	1	"Stay"	Put in chair 1	Twins
Episode 14 (December 9)	Groups (Brenciu)	Uptown	2	"Californication"	Put in chair 2	B52
Episode 14 (December 9)	Groups (Brenciu)	Trupa Maria	3	"Crocodile Rock"	Put in chair 3	Bravissimo
Episode 14 (December 9)	Groups (Brenciu)	Hip	4	"Flashlight"	Eliminated	—N/a
Episode 14 (December 9)	Groups (Brenciu)	Brain Band	5	"Bach's Songs Mix"	Put in chair 4	—
Episode 14 (December 9)	Groups (Brenciu)	Eleven	6	"Story of My Life"	Eliminated	—N/a
Episode 14 (December 9)	Groups (Brenciu)	Divas	7	"Nu Sunt"	Eliminated	—N/a
Episode 14 (December 9)	Groups (Brenciu)	Grupul Vera	8	"Wake Me Up"	Eliminated	—N/a
Episode 14 (December 9)	Groups (Brenciu)	Deea & George	9	"Nu Pune la Suflet"	Put in chair 5	Tomato
Episode 14 (December 9)	Groups (Brenciu)	Tea Rock	10	"Come Together"	Put in chair 6	—
Episode 14 (December 9)	Groups (Brenciu)	Twins	11	"Swing-Medley"	Put in chair 1	—
Episode 14 (December 9)	Groups (Brenciu)	B52	12	"Crazy in Love"	Put in chair 2	—
Episode 14 (December 9)	Groups (Brenciu)	Tomato	13	"I Believe I Can Fly"	Put in chair 5	—
Episode 14 (December 9)	Groups (Brenciu)	Bravissimo	14	"Say Something"	Put in chair 3	—

=== The Duels ===
After the Six-chair challenge, each mentor will have six contestants for the Duels. Each contestant will sing a song of their own choice, back to back, and each duel concludes with the respective mentor eliminating one of the two contestants; the three winners for each mentor will advance to the Live shows.

The Duels were broadcast on December 11, 2015.

Colour key:

- Artist won the Duel and advanced to the Live shows

- Artist lost the Duel and was eliminated

Contestants performances on the duels challenge
Episode	Category (mentor)	Duel	Act	Order	Song	Result
Episode 15 (December 11)	Groups (Brenciu)	Duel 1	Tea Rock	1	"The Show Must Go On"	Eliminated
Episode 15 (December 11)	Groups (Brenciu)	Duel 1	Tomato	2	"A Chi Mi Dice"	Finalist
Episode 15 (December 11)	Groups (Brenciu)	Duel 2	B52	7	"Love Runs Out"	Finalist
Episode 15 (December 11)	Groups (Brenciu)	Duel 2	Twins	8	"So Emotional"	Eliminated
Episode 15 (December 11)	Groups (Brenciu)	Duel 3	Brain Band	17	"Mambo Italiano"	Eliminated
Episode 15 (December 11)	Groups (Brenciu)	Duel 3	Bravissimo	18	"Largo al factotum"	Finalist
Episode 15 (December 11)	Over 20s (Matache)	Duel 1	Sasha Călinescu	3	"Toxic"	Eliminated
Episode 15 (December 11)	Over 20s (Matache)	Duel 1	Andrei Ioniță	4	"Rugă Pentru Părinţi"	Finalist
Episode 15 (December 11)	Over 20s (Matache)	Duel 2	Randy Roberts	9	"Love Never Felt So Good"	Eliminated
Episode 15 (December 11)	Over 20s (Matache)	Duel 2	Alex Vasilache	10	"(I Can't Get No) Satisfaction"	Finalist
Episode 15 (December 11)	Over 20s (Matache)	Duel 3	Dana Markitan	13	"A Little Party Never Killed Nobody (All We Got) "	Eliminated
Episode 15 (December 11)	Over 20s (Matache)	Duel 3	Anastasia Ursu	14	"Bunica Bate Toba"	Finalist
Episode 15 (December 11)	Under 20s (Banica)	Duel 1	Endy Glikman	5	"Take Me to Church"	Finalist
Episode 15 (December 11)	Under 20s (Banica)	Duel 1	Paul Bătinaş	6	"Sugar"	Eliminated
Episode 15 (December 11)	Under 20s (Banica)	Duel 2	Xenia Chitoroagă	11	"Unfaithful"	Eliminated
Episode 15 (December 11)	Under 20s (Banica)	Duel 2	Erika Isac	12	"Hey Mama"	Finalist
Episode 15 (December 11)	Under 20s (Banica)	Duel 3	Mădălina Căuş	15	"Rollin' on the River"	Eliminated
Episode 15 (December 11)	Under 20s (Banica)	Duel 3	Florin Răduţă	16	"I Have Nothing"	Finalist

=== Wildcard ===
In this season, the public will have the chance to save one of the acts that competed in the Auditions. The most voted act will go directly to the Live Shows. In the first live show if one of the mentor decides to take him in his team, then he will go further in the competition, otherwise he will be sent home. On December 18, 2015, Xenia Chitoroagă was declared the winner public.

== Finalists ==
The ten finalists will compete in the Live Shows.

Color Key
– Winner
– Runner-up
– Third place

Category (mentor)	Acts			
Under 20s (Bănică)	Xenia Chitoroagă	Endy Glikman	Erika Isac	Florin Răduţă
Over 20s (Matache)	Andrei Ioniță	Anastasia Ursu	Alex Vasilache	
Groups (Brenciu)	B52	Bravissimo	Tomato	

== Live shows ==
=== Results summary ===
Color key

–	Contestant received the most public votes
–	Contestant was in the bottom two and had to sing again in the final showdown
–	Contestant received the fewest public votes and was immediately eliminated (no final showdown)

Live shows results per contestant
Contestant	Live Show 1		Live Show 2	Live Show 3	
Contestant	Wildcard	Elimination	Elimination	Round 1	Round 2
Florin Răduţă	—N/a	Safe	Safe	1st 33,44%	Winner; 51,78%
Xenia Chitoroagă	Returned Week 1	Safe	Safe	2nd 28,45%	Runner-up; 48,22%
B52	—N/a	Safe	Safe	3rd 25,82%	Eliminated (Live Show 3)
Bravissimo	—N/a	Bottom two	Safe	4th 12,29%	Eliminated (Live Show 3)
Andrei Ioniță	—N/a	Safe	5th	Eliminated (Live Show 2)	
Anastasia Ursu	—N/a	Bottom two	6th	Eliminated (Live Show 2)	
Endy Glikman	—N/a	Bottom two	7th	Eliminated (Live Show 2)	
Erika Isac	—N/a	Bottom two	Eliminated (Live Show 1)		
Tomato	—N/a	Bottom two	Eliminated (Live Show 1)		
Alex Vasilache	—N/a	Bottom two	Eliminated (Live Show 1)		
Final showdown	None	Anastasia Ursu; Alex Vasilache	No judges vote or final showdown: public votes alone decide who is eliminated		
Final showdown	None	Bravissimo; Tomato	No judges vote or final showdown: public votes alone decide who is eliminated		
Final showdown	None	Erika Isac; Endy Glikman	No judges vote or final showdown: public votes alone decide who is eliminated		
Brenciu's vote to eliminate	None	Tomato	No judges vote or final showdown: public votes alone decide who is eliminated		
Matache's vote to eliminate	None	Alex Vasilache	No judges vote or final showdown: public votes alone decide who is eliminated		
Bănică's vote to eliminate	None	Erika Isac	No judges vote or final showdown: public votes alone decide who is eliminated		
Eliminated	None	Tomato by Brenciu	Endy Glikman; Public vote	Bravissimo; 12,29% Public vote	Xenia Chitoroagă; 48,22% Public vote to win
Eliminated	None	Alex Vasilache by Matache	Anastasia Ursu; Public vote	Bravissimo; 12,29% Public vote	Xenia Chitoroagă; 48,22% Public vote to win
Eliminated	None	Alex Vasilache by Matache	Anastasia Ursu; Public vote	B52; 25,82% Public vote	Florin Răduţă; 51,78% Public vote to win
Eliminated	None	Erika Isac by Bănică	Andrei Ioniță; Public vote	B52; 25,82% Public vote	Florin Răduţă; 51,78% Public vote to win
Reference(s)					

=== Live Show 1 - December 18, 2015 ===
- Theme: Romanian Gala
- Group performance: "Gură, taci!", "Cum ne noi", "A naibii dragoste"
- Musical guests: Jo, Nadir, Uddi and Randi ("Aseară ți-am luat basma", "Melodia mea" și "Până vara viitoare"), Nicoleta Nucă ("Nu sunt", "Adevăr sau minciună" feat. Cabron)

Contestants' performances on the first live show
Act	Order	Song	Result
Alex Vasilache	1	"Robot Armăsar"	Bottom two
Anastasia Ursu	2	"Mi-am pus busuioc în păr"	Bottom two
Andrei Ioniță	3	"Acolo este ţara mea"	Safe
Tomato	4	"De dragul tău"	Bottom two
B52	5	"Stinge lumina"	Safe
Bravissimo	6	"Lume, lume, soro lume"	Bottom two
Endy Glickman	7	"De la capăt"	Bottom two
Erika Isac	8	"Zig Zagga"	Bottom two
Florin Răduţă	9	"Oameni"	Safe
Xenia Chitoroagă	10	"Săracă inima mea"	Safe
Final showdown details
Over 20s
Alex Vasilache	1	"Copacul"	Eliminated
Anastasia Ursu	2	"Mociriță cu trifoi"	Safe
Groups
Tomato	1	"I Don't Want to Miss a Thing"	Eliminated
Bravissimo	2	"You Raise Me Up"	Safe
Under 20s
Erika Isac	1	"Do It like a Dude"	Eliminated
Endy Glickman	2	"Use Somebody"	Safe

Judges' votes to eliminate

- Brenciu: Tomato - He stated that "My decision today is based on one thing: those who have given me more emotions and can win X Factor! I will go further along with Bravissimo!"
- Matache: Alex Vasilache - gave no reason.
- Bănică : Erika Isac - He stated that "For me it was an experience! Today evening, my vote would be like this: who was the most motivated ?! The competitor who was the most motivated and understood what I wanted from him was Endy Glikman! "

=== Live Show 2 - December 25, 2015 ===
- Theme: Show Song, Christmas Song
- Musical guests: Gabriel Cotabiță - "Noapte albastră"

Contestants' performances on the second live show
Act	Order	First song	Order	Second song	Result
B52	1	"One Night Only"	14	"Veste-am adus"	Safe
Florin Răduţă	2	"O, ce veste minunată!"	9	"Uptown Funk"	Safe
Andrei Ioniță	3	"Moldovenii s-au nascut"	8	"Florile dalbe"	Eliminated
Endy Glikman	4	"Let It Snow! Let It Snow! Let It Snow!"	11	"Andrii Popa"	Eliminated
Bravissimo	5	"Jungle Book Theme"	10	"Colindul celui fără de țară"	Safe
Anastasia Ursu	6	"Iarna (Milioane)"	13	"Domino"	Eliminated
Xenia Chitoroagă	7	"Story of My Life"	12	"Sus, la poarta Raiului"	Safe

Notes

- This week featured a triple elimination. The three acts with the fewest votes were eliminated.

=== Live Show 3: Final - December 27, 2015 ===
==== Round 1 ====
- Theme: Duet with special guest and with their mentor
- Musical guests: Tudor Turcu, Florin Ristei and Adina Răducan - Medley (Nunta, Salcia, Bună seara, iubite!), Trebuia să fii tu; Carla's Dreams - "Te rog", "Cum ne noi" with Delia

Contestants' performances on the third live show
Act	Order	First Song (duet with special guest)	Order	Second Song (duet with mentor)	Result
Bravissimo	1	"Brindisi" (with Cezar Ouatu)	8	"Doamne, vino Doamne!" (with Horia Brenciu)	Fourth place
Florin Răduţă	2	"Fallin'" (with Nicoleta Nucă)	7	"Sweet Home Chicago" (with Ștefan Bănică, Jr.)	Safe
B52	5	"ABBA Medley" (with Lora)	3	"Crazy" (with Horia Brenciu)	Third place
Xenia Chitoroagă	6	"Pleacă" (with Cornel Ilie)	4	"Yesterday" (with Ștefan Bănică, Jr.)	Safe

==== Round 2 ====
- Theme: Final

Contestants' performances on the final live show
Act	Order	Song	Result
Florin Răduţă	1	"Eternitate"	Winner
Xenia Chitoroagă	2	"Pot să zbor"	Runner-up

== Ratings ==
Ep	Title	Date	National		Urban		18–49		Source
Ep	Title	Date	Average (thousands)	Rating (%)	Average (thousands)	Rating (%)	Average (thousands)	Rating (%)	Source
1	Auditions 1	17 September 2015	1.008	5.5	695	6.9	386	7.6	
2	Auditions 2	18 September 2015	870	4.7	495	4.9	233	4.6	
3	Auditions 3	25 September 2015	1.263	6.8	711	7.0	362	7.2	
4	Auditions 4	2 October 2015	1.151	6.2	726	7.2	384	7.6	
5	Auditions 5	9 October 2015	1.331	7.1	788	7.8	454	9.0	
6	Auditions 6	16 October 2015	1.183	6.4	762	7.6	438	8.6	
7	Auditions 7	23 October 2015	1.157	6.3	683	6.8	392	7.7	
8	Auditions 8	30 October 2015	1.041	5.6	672	6.7	389	7.7	
9	Auditions 9	6 November 2015	1.005	5.5	570	5.6	304	6.0	
10	Auditions 10	13 November 2015	1.018	5.5	611	6.1	333	6.6	
11	Auditions 11	20 November 2015	1.013	5.5	593	5.9	315	6.2	
12	Six-chair Challenge 1	27 November 2015	855	4.6	510	5.1	255	5.0	
13	Six-chair Challenge 2	4 December 2015	1.150	6.5	655	6.5	342	6.8	
14	Six-chair Challenge 3	9 December 2015	1.006	5.5	644	6.4	325	6.5	
15	The Duels	11 December 2015	1.030	5.6	552	5.5	241	4.8	
16	Live show 1	18 December 2015	936	5.1	515	5.1	257	5.1	
17	Live show 2 - Semifinal	25 December 2015	812	4.4	517	5.1	269	5.3	
18	Live show 3 - Final	27 December 2015	1.120	6.1	733	7.3	352	6.9	
