= X Factor (Romanian TV series) season 4 =

X Factor
- Season 4
- Hosted by: Răzvan Simion; Dani Oțil (A1)
- Judges: Delia Matache; Horia Brenciu; Ștefan Bănică, Jr. Cristian Minculescu (guest)
- Winner: Adina Răducan
- Winning mentor: Horia Brenciu
- Runner-up: Alexandra Crișan

Release
- Original network: Antena 1
- Original release: September 19 – December 26, 2014

Season chronology
- ← Previous; Season 3 Next → Season 5

X Factor is a Romanian television music competition that aims to find a new music talent to become a star. The fourth season began airing on 19 September 2014 on Antena 1.

The hosts are the same as in the first three seasons: Răzvan Simion and Dani Oțil, who are also known for hosting a well known morning show on Antena 1. Singer Delia Matache returned to the judging panel, while Horia Brenciu and Ștefan Bănică, Jr. joined the panel as replacements for the departing judges.

On December 26, 2014, the season concluded with Adina Răducan winning the Final, she was mentored by Brenciu. Alexandra Crișan, mentored by Bănică finished in second place.

== Auditions ==
Cities that auditions and/or pre-auditions were held in.

Audition process was based on the British and American version. First up were "The Producer's Audition", where the producers chose singers to proceed to the second phase which was "The Audition before the Judging panel". The first auditions took place at Craiova, on 24 May. They then took place in Sibiu, on 26 May, in Arad, on May 28 in Cluj Napoca on May 30, 2014, on June 2 in Iași, on June 5 in Galați and concluded on June 7, 2013 in Bucharest.

Summary of auditions
City	Auditions date	Venue
Craiova	May 24, 2014	Craiova University
Sibiu	May 26, 2014	
Arad	May 28, 2014	Hotel Parc
Cluj Napoca	May 30, 2014	Iulius Mall
Iași	June 2, 2014	Palas Mall
Galați	June 5, 2014	Hotel Faleza By Vega
Bucharest	June 7, 2014	Children's Palace

== Judges ==
In February 2014, rumours began circulating that Cheloo would not be returning for the fourth series, because of his aggressive behavior. When it was announced that The X Factor would be returning for a fourth season, Dan Bittman was linked to the role. In May 2014, it was confirmed that Delia Matache would return. Before the auditions began, Cheloo and Bittman were replaced by pop singer Horia Brenciu and rock star Ștefan Bănică, Jr.

== Bootcamp ==
Complete Teams

Color key
– Eliminated in Six-chair challenge
– Eliminated in Duels
– Finalist
– Wildcard

Category (mentor)	Top 38 acts						
Under 20s (Brenciu)							
Under 20s (Brenciu)	Adina Răducanu	Cristian Goaie	Monica Sannino	Denis Borovină	Diana Căldăraru	Nicholas Sealey	Sabrina Stroe
Under 20s (Brenciu)	Sorina Rostaș	Rafaelo Varga	Melisa Tolea	Sergiu Vonvea	Octavian Broșteanu	Miruna Buză	Teodora Ciocănea
Groups (Matache)							
Groups (Matache)	Contrast	R-Twins	Trupa 69	Adelina Damian & Victor Sas		Afina & Daniel	
Groups (Matache)	Black & White		Studio 7	Divas	Diana & Andrei Liță		Envi
Over 20s (Bănică)							
Over 20s (Bănică)	Alexandra Crișan	Alex Florea	Nicoleta Nucă	Sergiu Braga	Pavel Denisiuc	Iuliana Dobre	Alessio Paddeu
Over 20s (Bănică)	Helena Abegaz	Maria Cojocaru	Ovidiu Anton	Dorina Vasilashkco	Stela Boțan	Florin Șchiopu	Mihaela Belous

=== Six-chair challenge ===
For this season of The X Factor, the producers confirmed that the boot camp and judges' houses sections of the competition, which traditionally followed the audition rounds, had been dropped and replaced with a brand new stage called "The Six-Chair challenge".

This season, the categories follow the age-based format from season three. Brenciu mentored the Under 20s, Bănică the Over 20s and for the second time, Matache mentored the Groups.

Before the Six-chair challenge began, Vlad Simon left the competition because of health problems. Simon was replaced by Florin Șchiopu.

Color key
– Contestant was immediately eliminated after performance without switch
– Contestant was switched out later in the competition and eventually eliminated
– Contestant was not switched out and made the final six of their own category

Contestants performances on the six-chair challenge
Episode	Category (mentor)	Act	Order	Song	Mentor's decision	Switched with
Episode 10 (November 21)	Under 20s (Brenciu)	Cristian Goaie	1	"Feeling Good"	Put in chair 1	—
Episode 10 (November 21)	Under 20s (Brenciu)	Diana Căldăraru	2	"Yesterday"	Put in chair 2	—
Episode 10 (November 21)	Under 20s (Brenciu)	Teodora Ciocănea	3	"Believe"	Eliminated	—
Episode 10 (November 21)	Under 20s (Brenciu)	Sergiu Vonvea	4	"I Can't Stop Loving You"	Put in chair 3	—
Episode 10 (November 21)	Under 20s (Brenciu)	Sorina Rostaş	5	"You Raise Me Up"	Put in chair 4	—
Episode 10 (November 21)	Under 20s (Brenciu)	Nicholas Sealey	6	"Unchained Melody"	Put in chair 5	—
Episode 10 (November 21)	Under 20s (Brenciu)	Miruna Buză	7	"Skinny Love"	Eliminated	—
Episode 10 (November 21)	Under 20s (Brenciu)	Octavian Broşteanu	8	"Cât De Frumoasă Ești"	Eliminated	—
Episode 10 (November 21)	Under 20s (Brenciu)	Monica Sannino	9	"In Assenza Di Te"	Put in chair 6	—
Episode 10 (November 21)	Under 20s (Brenciu)	Sabrina Stroe	10	"Ain't No Sunshine"	Put in chair 3	Sergiu Vonvea
Episode 11 (November 28)	Under 20s (Brenciu)	Melisa Tolea	11	"L-O-V-E"	Eliminated	—
Episode 11 (November 28)	Under 20s (Brenciu)	Rafaelo Varga	12	"O Fată Ca Ea"	Eliminated	—
Episode 11 (November 28)	Under 20s (Brenciu)	Adina Răducan	13	"I Can't Make You Love Me"	Put in chair 4	Sorina Rostaş
Episode 11 (November 28)	Under 20s (Brenciu)	Denis Borovină	14	"Set Fire to the Rain"	Put in chair 3	Sabrina Stroe
Episode 11 (November 28)	Groups (Matache)	Adelina Damian & Victor Sas	15	"Apologize"	Put in chair 1	—
Episode 11 (November 28)	Groups (Matache)	Studio 7	16	"Fell in Love with an Alien"	Put in chair 2	—
Episode 11 (November 28)	Groups (Matache)	Envi	17	"I Will Always Love You"	Eliminated	—
Episode 11 (November 28)	Groups (Matache)	Black & White	18	"Just the Way You Are"/"Marry You"	Put in chair 3	—
Episode 11 (November 28)	Groups (Matache)	Trupa 69	19	"Taxi"	Put in chair 4	—
Episode 11 (November 28)	Groups (Matache)	Divas	20	"Survivor"	Put in chair 5	—
Episode 11 (November 28)	Groups (Matache)	Diana & Andrei Liță	21	"Let Her Go"	Eliminated	—
Episode 11 (November 28)	Groups (Matache)	Afina & Daniel ^{1}	22	"New York, New York"	Put in chair 6	—
Episode 11 (November 28)	Groups (Matache)	Contrast	23	"Stand by Me"	Put in chair 5	Divas
Episode 11 (November 28)	Groups (Matache)	R-Twins	24	"With You"	Put in chair 2	Studio 7
Episode 11 (November 28)	Over 20s (Bănică)	Mihaela Belous	25	"Stop!"	Eliminated	—
Episode 11 (November 28)	Over 20s (Bănică)	Iuliana Dobre	26	"I'll Stand By You"	Put in chair 3	—
Episode 11 (November 28)	Over 20s (Bănică)	Dorina Vasilashkco	27	"Amado Mio"	Put in chair 1	—
Episode 11 (November 28)	Over 20s (Bănică)	Ovidiu Anton	28	"All by Myself"	Put in chair 2	—
Episode 11 (November 28)	Over 20s (Bănică)	Florin Şchiopu	29	"Boyfriend"	Eliminated	—
Episode 11 (November 28)	Over 20s (Bănică)	Alexandra Crișan	30	"Angel"	Put in chair 4	—
Episode 11 (November 28)	Over 20s (Bănică)	Pavel Denesiuc	31	"My Heart Is Refusing Me"	Put in chair 5	—
Episode 11 (November 28)	Over 20s (Bănică)	Stela Boțan	32	"Someone like You"	Eliminated	—
Episode 11 (November 28)	Over 20s (Bănică)	Alexandru Florea	33	"Here Without You"	Put in chair 6	—
Episode 11 (November 28)	Over 20s (Bănică)	Nicoleta Nucă	34	"Say Something"	Put in chair 1	Dorina Vasilashkco
Episode 12 (November 29)	Over 20s (Bănică)	Maria Cojocaru	35	"One"	Eliminated	—
Episode 12 (November 29)	Over 20s (Bănică)	Alessio Paddeu	36	"When You Say Nothing at All"	Put in chair 2	Ovidiu Anton
Episode 12 (November 29)	Over 20s (Bănică)	Helena Abegaz	37	"Run"	Eliminated	—
Episode 12 (November 29)	Over 20s (Bănică)	Sergiu Braga	38	"O Sole Mio"	Put in chair 2	Alessio Paddeu

=== The Duels ===
After the Six-chair challenge, each mentor had six contestants for the Duels. The contestants were not told who they were up against until the day of the Duels. Each contestant sang a song of their own choice, back to back, and each duel concluded with the respective mentor eliminating one of the two contestants; the three winners for each mentor advanced to the Live shows.

Colour key:

- Artist won the Duel and advanced to the Live shows

- Artist lost the Duel and was eliminated

Contestants performances on the duels challenge
Episode	Category (mentor)	Duel	Act	Order	Song	Result
Episode 12 (November 29)	Over 20s (Bănică)	Duel 1	Alexandra Crișan	1	"One and Only"	Finalist
Episode 12 (November 29)	Over 20s (Bănică)	Duel 1	Iuliana Dobre	2	"Are You Gonna Be My Girl"	Eliminated
Episode 12 (November 29)	Over 20s (Bănică)	Duel 4	Alexandru Florea	7	"You Give Love a Bad Name"	Finalist
Episode 12 (November 29)	Over 20s (Bănică)	Duel 4	Pavel Denesiuc	8	"All of Me"	Eliminated
Episode 12 (November 29)	Over 20s (Bănică)	Duel 6	Sergiu Braga	11	"Con Te Partirò"	Eliminated
Episode 12 (November 29)	Over 20s (Bănică)	Duel 6	Nicoleta Nucă	12	"Hallelujah"	Finalist
Episode 12 (November 29)	Groups (Matache)	Duel 2	Black & White	3	"We Are Young"	Eliminated
Episode 12 (November 29)	Groups (Matache)	Duel 2	R-Twins	4	"The Lazy Song"	Finalist
Episode 12 (November 29)	Groups (Matache)	Duel 5	Afina & Daniel	9	"Halo"	Eliminated
Episode 12 (November 29)	Groups (Matache)	Duel 5	Trupa 69	10	"Dark Horse"	Finalist
Episode 12 (November 29)	Groups (Matache)	Duel 8	Contrast	15	"My Kind of Love"	Finalist
Episode 12 (November 29)	Groups (Matache)	Duel 8	Adelina Damian & Victor Sas	16	"This Love"	Eliminated
Episode 12 (November 29)	Under 20s (Brenciu)	Duel 3	Nicholas Sealey	5	"Blurred Lines"	Eliminated
Episode 12 (November 29)	Under 20s (Brenciu)	Duel 3	Cristian Goaie	6	"Love Me Again"	Finalist
Episode 12 (November 29)	Under 20s (Brenciu)	Duel 7 ^{2}	Monica Sannino	13	"Hit the Road Jack"	Finalist
Episode 12 (November 29)	Under 20s (Brenciu)	Duel 7 ^{2}	Adina Răducan	14	"Trurli"	Finalist
Episode 12 (November 29)	Under 20s (Brenciu)	Duel 9 ^{2}	Diana Căldăraru	17	"Sorry Seems to Be the Hardest Word"	Eliminated
Episode 12 (November 29)	Under 20s (Brenciu)	Duel 9 ^{2}	Denis Borovină	18	"La La La"	Eliminated

Notes

1. Daniel was not present in the "Six-Chair Challenge", due to a personal problem.
2. After the performances of Monica and Adina from the Under 20s category, their mentor, Brenciu couldn't decide between both of them, so the producers decided that Brenciu's decision will be taken after all his acts perform.

== Wildcard ==
It was announced on 3 December 2014 that there would be a wildcard twist on the live shows. The judges selected the wildcard acts from other categories. The wildcard acts were announced in the first live show with Sergiu Braga chosen by Brenciu for the Under 20s category, Alessio Paddeu chosen by Matache for the Groups and Miruna Buză chosen by Bănică for the Over 20s category.

== Finalists ==
The final 12 finalists were confirmed as follows:

Color Key
– Winner
– Runner-up
– Third place

Category (mentor)	Acts			
Under 20s (Brenciu)	Sergiu Braga	Cristian Goaie	Adina Răducan	Monica Sannino
Over 20s (Bănică)	Miruna Buză	Alexandra Crișan	Alexandru Florea	Nicoleta Nucă
Groups (Matache)	Contrast	Alessio Paddeu	R-Twins	Trupa 69

== Live shows ==
The live shows will have a change in this season. Only four live shows will take place. In the first two live shows, each category will have its own final showdown, the result of which is decided solely by its mentor. The outcome of the third show will only rely on the public vote and will have two eliminations (one of which will happen halfway through of the show, when the voting will have been frozen). The final will have four contestants. Two of the finalists will be eliminated halfway through the final show, when the voting will have been frozen. The winner is still determined by the public vote.

=== Results summary ===
Color key

–	Winner
–	Contestant was in the bottom two and had to sing again in the final showdown
–	Contestant received the fewest public votes and was immediately eliminated (no final showdown)

Weekly results per contestant
Contestant	Week 1		Week 2	Week 3		Week 4	
Contestant	Wildcard	Elimination	Week 2	Round 1	Round 2	Round 1	Round 2
Adina Răducan	—N/a	Safe	Safe	Safe	Safe	Safe	Winner
Alexandra Crișan	—N/a	Safe	Safe	Safe	Safe	Safe	Runner-Up
Trupa 69	—N/a	Safe	Safe	Safe	Safe	3rd	Eliminated (Week 4)
Alessio Paddeu	Returned Week 1	Safe	Bottom two	Safe	Safe	4th	Eliminated (Week 4)
Nicoleta Nucă	—N/a	Safe	Bottom two	Safe	5th	Eliminated (Week 3)	
Sergiu Braga	Returned Week 1	Safe	Bottom two	6th	Eliminated (Week 3)		
Alexandru Florea	—N/a	Bottom two	Bottom two	Eliminated (Week 2)			
Contrast	—N/a	Bottom two	Bottom two	Eliminated (Week 2)			
Cristian Goaie	—N/a	Bottom two	Bottom two	Eliminated (Week 2)			
Miruna Buză	Returned Week 1	Bottom two	Eliminated (Week 1)				
R-Twins	—N/a	Bottom two	Eliminated (Week 1)				
Monica Sannino	—N/a	Bottom two	Eliminated (Week 1)				
Final showdown	None	Cristian Goaie, Monica Sannino	Cristian Goaie, Sergiu Braga	No judges' vote or final showdown: public votes alone decide who is eliminated			
Final showdown	None	R-Twins, Contrast	Contrast, Alessio Paddeu	No judges' vote or final showdown: public votes alone decide who is eliminated			
Final showdown	None	Alexandru Florea, Miruna Buză	Alexandru Florea, Nicoleta Nucă	No judges' vote or final showdown: public votes alone decide who is eliminated			
Brenciu's vote to eliminate	None	Monica Sannino	Cristian Goaie	No judges' vote or final showdown: public votes alone decide who is eliminated			
Matache's vote to eliminate	None	R-Twins	Contrast	No judges' vote or final showdown: public votes alone decide who is eliminated			
Bănică's vote to eliminate	None	Miruna Buză	Alexandru Florea	No judges' vote or final showdown: public votes alone decide who is eliminated			
Eliminated	None	Monica Sannino by Brenciu	Cristian Goaie by Brenciu	Sergiu Braga; Public vote	Nicoleta Nucă; Public vote	Alessio Paddeu; Public vote	Alexandra Crișan; Public vote to win
Eliminated	None	R-Twins by Matache	Contrast by Matache	Sergiu Braga; Public vote	Nicoleta Nucă; Public vote	Alessio Paddeu; Public vote	Alexandra Crișan; Public vote to win
Eliminated	None	R-Twins by Matache	Contrast by Matache	Sergiu Braga; Public vote	Nicoleta Nucă; Public vote	Trupa 69; Public vote	Adina Răducan; Public vote to win
Eliminated	None	Miruna Buză by Bănică	Alexandru Florea by Bănică	Sergiu Braga; Public vote	Nicoleta Nucă; Public vote	Trupa 69; Public vote	Adina Răducan; Public vote to win
Reference(s)							

=== Live show details ===
==== Week 1 (December 5) ====
- Theme: Romanian music
- Musical guests: Ștefan Bănică, Jr. (Medley from: ( "Am Uitat", "Ziua", "Bubulina Gospodina", "O Seară De Mai"), "Alerg Printre Stele", "S-o Facem Lată")

Contestants' performances on the first live show
Act,	Order	Song	Result
Monica Sannino	1	"Acasă"	Bottom two
Cristian Goaie	2	"Mă-ntorc La Tine Mare Albastră"	Bottom two
Adina Răducan	3	"Iartă"	Safe
Sergiu Braga	4	"Eminescu"	Safe
R-Twins	5	"Dana"	Bottom two
Contrast	6	"Îți Arăt Că Pot"	Bottom two
Trupa 69	7	"Vreau Sărutarea Ta"	Safe
Alessio Paddeu	8	"Caruso"	Safe
Alexandra Crișan	9	"Ochii Tăi"	Safe
Alexandru Florea	10	"Numai Una"	Bottom two
Nicoleta Nucă	11	"România"	Safe
Miruna Buză	12	"Cântă Cucu"	Bottom two
Final showdown details
Under 20s
Cristian Goaie	1	"Sărutări Criminale"	Safe
Monica Sannino	2	"Beautiful"	Eliminated
Groups
R-Twins	1	"Rude"	Eliminated
Contrast	2	"The Monster"	Safe
Over 20s
Alexandru Florea	1	"Bed of Roses"	Safe
Miruna Buză	2	"Ploaie În Luna Lui Martie"	Eliminated

Judges' votes to eliminate

- Brenciu: Monica Sannino, stated that he will go further, in the contest, with the most spectacular act.
- Matache: R-Twins, gave no reason.
- Bănică : Miruna Buză, stated that he saw more determination in the other act.

==== Week 2 (December 12) ====
- Theme: Famous Voices
- Group performance(s): Medley from: ("Happy", "Bang Bang", "Baby Don't Lie")
- Musical guests: Horia Brenciu ("Hello", "Inima Nu Vrea", "Azi Am Chef De Mare", "Seara Ta De Crăciun", "Fac Ce-Mi Spune Inima")
- Judge guest : Cristian Minculescu

Contestants' performances on the second live show
Act	Order	Song	Result
Adina Răducan	1	"Clown"	Safe
Cristian Goaie	2	"Jelem, Jelem"	Bottom two
Sergiu Braga	3	"Ploaia"	Bottom two
Contrast	4	"Noi Simţim La Fel"	Bottom two
Alessio Paddeu	5	"I'm Not the Only One"	Bottom two
Trupa 69	6	"Locul Potrivit"	Safe
Nicoleta Nucă	7	"Chandelier"	Bottom two
Alexandru Florea	8	"Let Me Entertain You"	Bottom two
Alexandra Crișan	9	"Say You Love Me"	Safe
Final showdown details
Under 20s
Cristian Goaie	1	"Billionaire"	Eliminated
Sergiu Braga	2	"All by Myself"	Safe
Groups
Alessio Paddeu	1	"Love of My Life"	Safe
Contrast	2	"Wrecking Ball"	Eliminated
Over 20s
Alexandru Florea	1	"One"	Eliminated
Nicoleta Nucă	2	"The Edge of Glory"	Safe

Judges' votes to eliminate

- Brenciu: Cristian Goaie, Brenciu stated that with the other act, he will win the contest.
- Matache: Contrast
- Bănică : Alexandru Florea, Bănică stated that he will go further with the act, that he thinks, will make a career in music.

==== Week 3 (December 19) ====
First Round

- Theme: Duets
- Group performance(s): Medley from: ("Wiggle", "Shake It Off", "Can't Hold Us")
- Musical guests: Delia Matache ("Pe Aripi De Vânt" feat. Florin Ristei, "Cine Iubește Și Lasă")

Contestants' performances on the third live show
Act	Order	Song	Result
Alexandra Crişan	1	"Empire State of Mind" (with CRBL)	Safe
Trupa 69	2	"Ipotecat" (with Dragoş Udilă)	Safe
Adina Răducan	3	"Colaj De Sâmbătă Seara" (with Daniel Buzdugan)	Safe
Nicoleta Nucă	4	"One Sweet Day" (with Florin Ristei)	Safe
Sergiu Braga	5	"Zaraza" (with Nelu Ploieșteanu)	Eliminated
Alessio Paddeu	6	"Say Something" (with Lora)	Safe

Second Round

- Theme: Semifinal
- Musical Guests : Delia Matache

Contestants' performances on the third live show
Act	Order	Song	Result
Alexandra Crişan	1	"(You Make Me Feel Like) A Natural Woman"	Safe
Trupa 69	2	"Price Tag"	Safe
Adina Răducan	3	"Bună Seara, Iubite"	Safe
Nicoleta Nucă	4	"Something's Got a Hold on Me"	Eliminated
Alessio Paddeu	5	"When I Was Your Man"	Safe

==== Week 4: Final (December 26) ====
===== Round 1 =====
- Theme: Final
- Group performance(s): "All I Want for Christmas Is You"
- Musical guests: What's Up - "Taxi", Corul Naţional de Cameră "Madrigal" - Carols Medley

Contestants' performances on the fourth live show
Act	Order	Song	Order	Song	Result
Alessio Paddeu	1	"Meravigliosa Creatura" (with Delia Matache)	6	"Oameni"	4th Place
Alexandra Crişan	2	"Mai Frumoasă"	5	"Strânge-mă În Brațe" (with Ștefan Bănică, Jr.)	Safe
Adina Răducan	3	"Mi-e Dor De Tine" (with Horia Brenciu)	8	"Galbenă Gutuie"	Safe
Trupa 69	4	"Te Pup, Pa Pa!"	7	"Prietena Ta" (with Delia Matache)	3rd Place

===== Round 2 =====
- Theme: Final
- Musical guests: Voltaj - "De La Capăt"

Contestants' performances on the final live show
Act	Order	Song	Result
Adina Răducan	1	"One Moment In Time"	Winner
Alexandra Crişan	2	"Someone Like You"/"Too Much Love Will Kill You"	Runner-Up

== Ratings ==
Ep	Title	Date	National		Urban		18-49		Source
Ep	Title	Date	Average (thousands)	Rating (%)	Average (thousands)	Rating (%)	Average (thousands)	Rating (%)	Source
1	Auditions 1	19 September 2014	1 413	7.6	927	9.2	480	9.6	
2	Auditions 2	26 September 2014	1 490	8	944	9.4	490	9.7	
3	Auditions 3	3 October 2014	1 398	7.6	843	8.4	483	9.6	
4	Auditions 4	10 October 2014	1 424	7.7	930	9.2	498	9.9	
5	Auditions 5	17 October 2014	1 424	7.7	881	8.8	476	9.4	
6	Auditions 6	24 October 2014	1 392	7.5	912	9.1	480	9.6	
7	Auditions 7	31 October 2014	1 180	6.4	697	6.9	416	8.2	
8	Auditions 8	7 November 2014	1 187	6.4	757	7.5	407	8.1	
9	Auditions 9	14 November 2014	1 120	6	704	7	353	7	
10	Auditions 10/Six-chair challenge 1	21 November 2014	1 072	5.8	654	6.5	360	7.2	
11	Six-chair challenge 2	28 November 2014	862	4.7	538	5.3	310	6.2	
12	Six-chair challenge 3 /The Duels	29 November 2014	1 233	6.7	753	7.5	378	7.5	
13	First Live Show	5 December 2014	888	4.8	607	6.0	310	6.2	
14	Second Live Show	12 December 2014	895	4.8	542	5.4	302	6	
15	Third Live Show	19 December 2014	892	4.8	538	5.3	292	5.8	
16	Final Live Show	26 December 2014	1 016	5.5	735	7	374	7.5	

== Controversy ==
In the "Six-chair challenge", Brenciu shocks everyone, even the presenters, by eliminating Miruna Buză, a girl with "excellent vocal technique". Despite getting great reviews from the other mentors, the girl received unexpected criticism from her mentor : "I thought you will surprise us today with something else...Miruna, you have to go home".
