= X Factor (Romanian TV series) season 6 =

X Factor
- Season 6
- Hosted by: Răzvan Simion; Dani Oțil
- Judges: Delia Matache; Horia Brenciu; Ștefan Bănică, Jr. Carla's Dreams; Crina Mardare (guest)
- Winner: Olga Verbiţchi
- Winning mentor: Carla's Dreams
- Runner-up: Raul Eregep

Release
- Original network: Antena 1
- Original release: September 9 – December 23, 2016

Season chronology
- ← Previous; Season 5 Next → Season 7

The sixth season of Romanian television music competition X Factor—based on The X Factor series—started airing on September 9, 2016 on Romanian broadcaster Antena 1. Răzvan Simion and Dani Oțil are the hosts as in the previous five seasons, with Delia Matache, Horia Brenciu and Ștefan Bănică, Jr. returning to the judging panel with the addition of Carla's Dreams as the fourth judge.

Olga Verbiţchi won the competition and Carla's Dreams became the winning mentor.

== Judges ==
- Delia Matache

Delia Matache is a famous Romanian eurobeat singer-songwriter, TV celebrity, dancer, philanthropist, former model, fashion designer. She has started her stage music activity in 1999 in N&D music band with Nicolae Marin and had released 4 albums, and after the split off in 2003 she had released another two solo albums.

- Horia Brenciu

Horia Brenciu is a Romanian singer, television host for the Romanian version of Dancing with the Stars, successful entertainer, and philanthropist. He studied at National College Andrei Şaguna from Braşov, then he continued to Şcoala Populară de Artă Braşov, at piano and canto class, and in 1998 he finished The Theater Academy in Bucharest.

- Ștefan Bănică, Jr.

Ștefan Bănică, Jr. is a Romanian entertainer, of roma people origin from his father side, TV presenter, one of the most important Romanian TV personality, the son of actor Ștefan Bănică. He is well known in Romanian for presenting the Romania version of “Dancing with the Stars”, the most longevive dance competition ever aired in Romania, broadcast on Pro TV.

- Carla's Dreams

Carla's Dreams is a Moldavian musical project which was started by Dobra Robertin 2012. The band is an anonymous group of singers and composers who sing in Romanian, Russian and English. During concerts, the band's vocalist, to hide his identity, wears hood and sunglasses, and his face is masked.

Established in Chișinău, Carla's Dreams combines several musical styles, including hip hop, jazz, rock and pop. The first song produced by Carla's Dreams was Dă-te ("Get Off"). Carla's Dreams has launched in Romania in 2013, along with Inna with the song P.O.H.U.I., later to sing with Loredana Lumea ta ("Your World"), and in 2015 with Delia, releasing songs Cum ne noi ("How We Us") and Da, mamă ("Yes, Mother").

== Auditions ==
Cities that auditions and/or pre-auditions were held in.

Audition process was based on the British and American version. First up were "The Producer's Audition", where the producers chose singers to proceed to the second phase which was "The Audition before the Judging panel".

Summary of auditions
City	Auditions date
Craiova	May 5, 2016
Arad	May 7, 2016
Cluj Napoca	May 9, 2016
Sibiu	May 12, 2016
Iași	May 14, 2016
Galați	May 17, 2016
Chișinău	May 18, 2016
Bucharest	May 21, 2016

The auditions were broadcast from 9 September 2016 until 11 November 2016. The auditions consisted in 11 episodes.

== Bootcamp ==
This season, there will be four categories : Boys (14-24 years), Girls (14-24 years), Over 24s and Groups. The judges selected themselves which category they will mentor this season.

Brenciu will mentor the Over 24s, Bănică the Groups, Carla's Dream the Girls and Matache will mentor the Boys.

Complete Teams

Color key
– Eliminated in Four-chair challenge
– Eliminated in Duels
– Finalist
– Wildcard

Category (mentor)	Top 40 acts				
Boys (Matache)	Raul Eregep	Emilian Nechifor	Alex Mladin	Johnny Bădulescu	Rareş Cazacu
Boys (Matache)	Andrei Petruş	Dragoş Luca	Răzvan Moldovan	Simion Caragia	Cătălin Caragea
Girls (Carla's)	Izabela Simion	Olga Verbiţchi	Miruna Pânzaru	Enrica Tara	Anastasia Jantîc
Girls (Carla's)	Lizuca Bîgu	Letiţia Roman	Alexandra Sîrghi	Andreea Alupei	Alexandra Tănăsoiu
Over 24s (Brenciu)	Loredana Anghelache	Marcel Roşca	Cezar Dometi	Monica Prodea	Aldo Blaga
Over 24s (Brenciu)	Eliza Georgescu	Anca Pârlea	Marco Sentieri	Radu Hârşulescu	Cecilia Cesario
Groups (Bănică)	3 O'Clock	Apollo	Doredos	Estera & Rebeca	Răzvan & Alecu
Groups (Bănică)	Dorian Lupu & Cristina Baban	Bogdan & Mugurel	Nobil Band	Crescendo	Călin & Elis

=== Four-chair challenge ===
This season, the categories will face the four-chair challenge. From the 40 acts competing, at the end of this round, only 16 acts will go further in the competition. Also this year there will be a "Golden Chair" where a mentor can send an act directly in the live shows.

The Four-Chair Challenge was broadcast between November 18 and November 30 and consisted in 4 episodes.

Color key
– Contestant was immediately eliminated after performance without switch
– Contestant was switched out later in the competition and eventually eliminated
– Contestant was not switched out and made the final four of their own category

Contestants performances on the four-chair challenge
Episode	Category (mentor)	Act	Order	Song	Mentor's decision	Switched with
Episode 12 (November 18)	Over 24s (Brenciu)	Aldo Blaga	1	"Careless Whisper"	Put in chair 2	Marcel Roşca
Episode 12 (November 18)	Over 24s (Brenciu)	Eliza Georgescu	2	"They Just Keep Moving the Line"	Put in chair 1	Loredana Anghelache
Episode 12 (November 18)	Over 24s (Brenciu)	Marco Sentieri	3	"Più bella cosa"	Put in chair 3	Cezar Dometi
Episode 12 (November 18)	Over 24s (Brenciu)	Anca Pârlea	4	"Vreau să vii în viaţa mea"	Put in chair 4	Monica Prodea
Episode 12 (November 18)	Over 24s (Brenciu)	Cecilia Cesario	5	"Try"	Eliminated	—N/a
Episode 12 (November 18)	Over 24s (Brenciu)	Radu Hârşulescu	6	"Virtual Insanity"	Eliminated	—N/a
Episode 12 (November 18)	Over 24s (Brenciu)	Cezar Dometi	7	"Never Tear Us Apart"	Put in chair 3	—
Episode 12 (November 18)	Over 24s (Brenciu)	Monica Prodea	8	"Love Me Tender"	Put in chair 4	—
Episode 12 (November 18)	Over 24s (Brenciu)	Loredana Anghelache	9	"Halo"	Put in chair 1	—
Episode 12 (November 18)	Over 24s (Brenciu)	Marcel Roşca	10	"Sorry Seems to Be the Hardest Word"	Put in chair 2	—
Episode 13 (November 23)	Groups (Bănică)	Dorian Lupu & Cristina Baban	1	"Breathe"	Put in chair 4	Apollo
Episode 13 (November 23)	Groups (Bănică)	Doredos	2	"Fragile"	Put in chair 1	—
Episode 13 (November 23)	Groups (Bănică)	Bogdan & Mugurel	3	"Copacul"	Put in chair 2	Răzvan & Alecu
Episode 13 (November 23)	Groups (Bănică)	Călin & Elis	4	"Endless Love"	Eliminated	—N/a
Episode 13 (November 23)	Groups (Bănică)	Crescendo	5	"We Are Young"	Eliminated	—N/a
Episode 13 (November 23)	Groups (Bănică)	Nobil Band	6	"Mociriţă cu trifoi"	Put in chair 3	Estera & Rebeca
Episode 13 (November 23)	Groups (Bănică)	Estera & Rebeca	7	"Flashlight"	Put in chair 3	—
Episode 13 (November 23)	Groups (Bănică)	Răzvan & Alecu	8	"Don't Stop the Music"	Put in chair 2	3 O'Clock
Episode 13 (November 23)	Groups (Bănică)	Apollo	9	"You Don't Own Me"	Put in chair 4	—
Episode 13 (November 23)	Groups (Bănică)	3 O'Clock	10	"Cele două cuvinte"	Put in chair 2	—
Episode 14 (November 25)	Girls (Carla's)	Alexandra Tănăsoiu	1	"Cheap Thrills"	Put in chair 1	Lizuca Bigu
Episode 14 (November 25)	Girls (Carla's)	Andreea Alupei	2	"Black Widow"	Put in chair 2	Letiţia Roman
Episode 14 (November 25)	Girls (Carla's)	Miruna Pânzaru	3	"Who You Are"	Put in chair 3	—
Episode 14 (November 25)	Girls (Carla's)	Anastasia Jantîc	4	"Dangerous Woman"	Put in chair 4	Olga Verbiţchi
Episode 14 (November 25)	Girls (Carla's)	Lizuca Bîgu	5	"Stitches"	Put in chair 1	Enrica Tara
Episode 14 (November 25)	Girls (Carla's)	Letiţia Roman	6	"Impossible"	Put in chair 2	Izabela Simion
Episode 14 (November 25)	Girls (Carla's)	Alexandra Sîrghi	7	"Faded"	Eliminated	—N/a
Episode 14 (November 25)	Girls (Carla's)	Izabela Simion	8	"Never Forget You"	Put in chair 2	—
Episode 14 (November 25)	Girls (Carla's)	Enrica Tara	9	"7 Years"	Put in chair 1	—
Episode 14 (November 25)	Girls (Carla's)	Olga Verbiţchi	10	"Take Me to Church"	Put in chair 4	—
Episode 15 (November 30)	Boys (Matache)	Cătălin Caragea	1	"Sex on Fire"	Eliminated	—N/a
Episode 15 (November 30)	Boys (Matache)	Simion Caragia	2	"Lost on You"	Put in chair 2	Johnny Bădulescu
Episode 15 (November 30)	Boys (Matache)	Andrei Petruş	3	"Photograph"	Put in chair 3	Raul Eregep
Episode 15 (November 30)	Boys (Matache)	Alex Mladin	4	"Sorry"	Put in chair 1	—
Episode 15 (November 30)	Boys (Matache)	Rareş Cazacu	5	"Marie, Marie"	Put in chair 4	Emilian Nechifor
Episode 15 (November 30)	Boys (Matache)	Johnny Bădulescu	6	"Earned It"	Put in chair 2	—
Episode 15 (November 30)	Boys (Matache)	Răzvan Moldovan	7	"Inimi Desenate"	Eliminated	—N/a
Episode 15 (November 30)	Boys (Matache)	Dragoş Luca	8	"Damn Your Eyes"	Eliminated	—N/a
Episode 15 (November 30)	Boys (Matache)	Raul Eregep	9	"I Won't Let You Go"	Put in chair 3	—
Episode 15 (November 30)	Boys (Matache)	Emilian Nechifor	10	"Lay Me Down"	Put in chair 4	—

=== Duels ===
At the end of this round there will be 8 acts remaining, two for each category.

The two winners for each mentor will advance to the Live shows.

Colour key:

- Artist won the Duel and advanced to the Live shows

- Artist lost the Duel and was eliminated

Contestants performances on the duels challenge
Episode	Category (mentor)	Duel	Act	Order	Song	Result
Episode 16 (December 2)	Boys (Matache)	Duel 1	Raul Eregep	5	"A Change Is Gonna Come"	Finalist
Episode 16 (December 2)	Boys (Matache)	Duel 1	Alex Mladin	6	"Don't Let the Sun Go Down on Me"	Eliminated
Episode 16 (December 2)	Boys (Matache)	Duel 2	Johnny Bădulescu	13	"De-ai fi tu salcie"	Eliminated
Episode 16 (December 2)	Boys (Matache)	Duel 2	Emilian Nechifor	14	"Make It Rain"	Finalist
Episode 16 (December 2)	Girls (Carla's)	Duel 1	Enrica Tara	3	"Send My Love (To Your New Lover)"	Eliminated
Episode 16 (December 2)	Girls (Carla's)	Duel 1	Izabela Simion	4	"Jealous"	Finalist
Episode 16 (December 2)	Girls (Carla's)	Duel 2	Miruna Pânzaru	11	"Sledgehammer"	Eliminated
Episode 16 (December 2)	Girls (Carla's)	Duel 2	Olga Verbiţchi	12	"Chandelier"	Finalist
Episode 16 (December 2)	Over 24s (Brenciu)	Duel 1	Cezar Dometi	15	"Caruso"	Eliminated
Episode 16 (December 2)	Over 24s (Brenciu)	Duel 1	Marcel Roşca	16	"Cât de frumoasă ești"	Finalist
Episode 16 (December 2)	Over 24s (Brenciu)	Duel 2	Monica Prodea	7	"Back to Black"	Eliminated
Episode 16 (December 2)	Over 24s (Brenciu)	Duel 2	Loredana Anghelache	8	"Iubirea Schimbă Tot"	Finalist
Episode 16 (December 2)	Groups (Bănică)	Duel 1	3 O'Clock	9	"Candyman"	Finalist
Episode 16 (December 2)	Groups (Bănică)	Duel 1	Doredos	10	"The Swinging Blue Jeans"	Eliminated
Episode 16 (December 2)	Groups (Bănică)	Duel 2	Estera & Rebeca	1	"Because of You"	Eliminated
Episode 16 (December 2)	Groups (Bănică)	Duel 2	Apollo	2	"Can't Hold Us"	Finalist

=== Wildcard ===
In this season, like Season 5, the public will have the chance to save one of the acts that competed in the Auditions. The most voted act will go directly to the Live Shows. In the first live show if one of the mentor decides to take him in his team, then he will go further in the competition, otherwise he will be sent home.

The winner of this season was Alex Mladin from the Boys Category.

== Finalists ==
The nine finalists will compete in the Live Shows.

– Winner
– Runner-up
– Third place

Category (mentor)	Acts		
Boys (Matache)	Raul Eregep	Alex Mladin	Emilian Nechifor
Girls (Carla's)	Izabela Simion	Olga Verbiţchi	
Over 24s (Brenciu)	Loredana Anghelache	Marcel Roşca	
Groups (Bănică)	3 O'Clock	Apollo	

== Live shows ==
=== Results summary ===
Color key

–	Contestant was announced as the winner
–	Contestant has returned in the competition
–	Contestant was in the bottom three and had to sing again in the final showdown
–	Contestant was in the bottom three but received the fewest votes and was immediately eliminated
–	Contestant received the fewest public votes and was immediately eliminated (no final showdown)

Live shows results per contestant
Contestant	Live Show 1		Live Show 2		Live Show 3	
Contestant	Wildcard	Elimination	Round 1	Round 2	Round 1	Round 2
Olga Verbiţchi	—N/a	Safe	Safe	Safe	Safe	Winner
Raul Eregep	—N/a	Safe	Safe	Safe	Safe	Runner-Up
Alex Mladin	Returned Gala 1	Safe	Safe	Safe	3rd	Eliminated (Gala 3)
Marcel Roşca	—N/a	Bottom three	Safe	Bottom three	4th	Eliminated (Gala 3)
Loredana Anghelache	—N/a	Safe	Safe	Bottom three	Eliminated (Gala 2)	
Emilian Nechifor	—N/a	Safe	Safe	6th	Eliminated (Gala 2)	
Izabela Simion	—N/a	Safe	7th	Eliminated (Gala 2)		
3 O'Clock	—N/a	Bottom three	Eliminated (Gala 1)			
Apollo	—N/a	9th	Eliminated (Gala 1)			
Final showdown	None	Marcel Roşca, 3 O'Clock	None	Marcel Roşca, Loredana Anghelache	None	
Brenciu's vote to eliminate	None	3 O'Clock	None	Roşca	None	
Matache's vote to eliminate	None	3 O'Clock	None	Anghelache	None	
Bănică's vote to eliminate	None	Roşca	None	Anghelache	None	
Carla's vote to eliminate	None	3 O'Clock	None	Anghelache	None	
Eliminated	None	Apollo by public vote	Izabela Simion by public vote	Emilian Nechifor by public vote	Alex Mladin by public vote	Raul Eregep by public vote
Eliminated	None	3 O'Clock by judges vote	Izabela Simion by public vote	Loredana Anghelache by judges vote	Marcel Roşca by public vote	Olga Verbiţchi by public vote
Reference(s)						

=== Live Show 1 - December 9, 2016 ===
- Theme: Romanian Gala
- Group performance: Medley ("Da-mi noptile inapoi", "Sa te gandesti la mine", "Focul", "Vreau o minune")
- Musical guests: Horia Brenciu ("Langa tine", "Fac ce-mi spune inima"), Carla's Dreams ("Sub pielea mea", "Ne bucuram in ciuda lor")

Contestants' performances on the first live show
Act	Order	Song	Result
Raul Eregep	1	"Multumesc iubita mama"	Safe
Apollo	2	"Pierdut buletin"	Eliminated
Marcel Roşca	3	"Pe aripi de vant"	Bottom three
Izabela Simion	4	"Cine iubeste si lasa / Marioara de la Gorj"	Safe
Loredana Anghelache	5	"Sa nu mi iei dragostea"	Safe
Emilian Nechifor	6	"Ana, zorile se varsa"	Safe
Olga Verbiţchi	7	"Constantine, Constantine"	Safe
3 O'Clock	8	"Ce e dragostea?"	Bottom three
Alex Mladin	9	"Ochii aia verzi"	Safe
Final showdown details
Marcel Roşca	1	"Look into My Eyes"	Safe
3 O'Clock	2	"The Way You Make Me Feel"	Eliminated

=== Live Show 2: Semifinal - December 16, 2016 ===
Contestants' performances on the second live show
Act	Order	Song	Result
Round 1
Alex Mladin	1	"Şi îngerii au demonii lor"	Safe
Izabela Simion	2	"Cuvintele tale"	Eliminated
Marcel Roşca	3	"Săracă inima mea"	Safe
Olga Verbiţchi	4	"Cine te crezi"	Safe
Emilian Nechifor	5	"Ne împotrivim"	Safe
Loredana Anghelache	6	"Cerul"	Safe
Raul Eregep	7	"Imperfect"	Safe
Round 2
Emilian Nechifor	1	"Cake by the Ocean"	Eliminated
Raul Eregep	2	"Treat You Better"	Safe
Marcel Roşca	3	"The Show Must Go On"	Bottom three
Olga Verbiţchi	4	"The Greatest"	Safe
Loredana Anghelache	5	"Hello"	Bottom three
Alex Mladin	6	"Nothing Really Matters"	Safe
Final showdown details
Loredana Anghelache	1	"Listen"	Eliminated
Marcel Roşca	2	"Breathe Easy"	Safe

=== Live Show 3: Final - December 23, 2016 ===
==== Round 1 ====
- Theme: Duet with special guest and with their mentor

Contestants' performances on the third live show
Act	Order	First Song (duet with special guest)	Order	Second Song (duet with mentor)	Result
Olga Verbiţchi	1	"Bună dimineața" (with Zdob și Zdub)	8	"Te rog" (with Carla's Dreams)	Safe
Alex Mladin	2	"Love Me like You Do" (with Sore)	5	"It's My Life" (with Delia Matache)	3rd place
Marcel Roşca	3	"Atât de singur" (with Alin Opera)	6	"I'll Make Love to You" (with Horia Brenciu)	4th place
Raul Eregep	4	"Beneath Your Beautiful" (with Alina Eremia)	7	"Hallelujah" (with Delia Matache)	Safe

==== Round 2 ====
- Theme: Final

Contestants' performances on the final live show
Act	Order	Song	Result
Raul Eregep	1	"Writing's on the Wall"	Runner-up
Olga Verbiţchi	2	"Feeling Good"	Winner

== Ratings ==
Ep	Title	Date	National		Urban		18-49		Source
Ep	Title	Date	Average (thousands)	Rating (%)	Average (thousands)	Rating (%)	Average (thousands)	Rating (%)	Source
1	Auditions 1	9 September 2016	1.009	5.6	498	5.1	263	5.9	
2	Auditions 2	16 September 2016	1.024	5.7	607	6.2	321	7.2	
3	Auditions 3	23 September 2016	1.129	6.3	626	6.4	359	8.0	
4	Auditions 4	25 September 2016	1.643	9.2	954	9.8	501	11.2	
5	Auditions 5	30 September 2016	1.258	7.0	702	7.2	393	8.8	
6	Auditions 6	7 October 2016	1.188	6.6	717	7.4	396	8.8	
7	Auditions 7	14 October 2016	1.160	6.5	663	6.8	342	7.7	
8	Auditions 8	21 October 2016	1.198	6.7	670	6.9	357	7.9	
9	Auditions 9	28 October 2016	1.120	6.2	595	6.1	299	6.6	
10	Auditions 10	4 November 2016	1.230	6.9	653	6.7	332	7.4	
11	Auditions 11	11 November 2016	1.050	5.8	552	5.7	282	6.3	
12	Four-chair Challenge 1	18 November 2016	920	5.1	530	5.4	260	5.8	
13	Four-chair Challenge 2	23 November 2016	1.059	5.9	587	6.0	298	6.6	
14	Four-chair Challenge 3	25 November 2016	1.161	6.5	700	7.2	355	7.9	
15	Four-chair Challenge 4	30 November 2016							
16	The Duels	2 December 2016							
17	Live Show 1	9 December 2016							
18	Live Show 2	16 December 2016							
19	Live Show 3	23 December 2016							
