= Sibiu Christmas Market =

Christmas market in Sibiu, Romania

Sibiu Christmas Market Târgul de Crăciun din Sibiu
- Status: Active
- Genre: Christmas market
- Date: Mid-November – Early January
- Frequency: Annual
- Locations: Piața Mare, Sibiu, Romania
- Years active: 2007–present
- Attendance: c. 400,000–500,000 (annual estimate)
- Organiser: Asociația Events for Tourism
- Website: targuldecraciun.ro

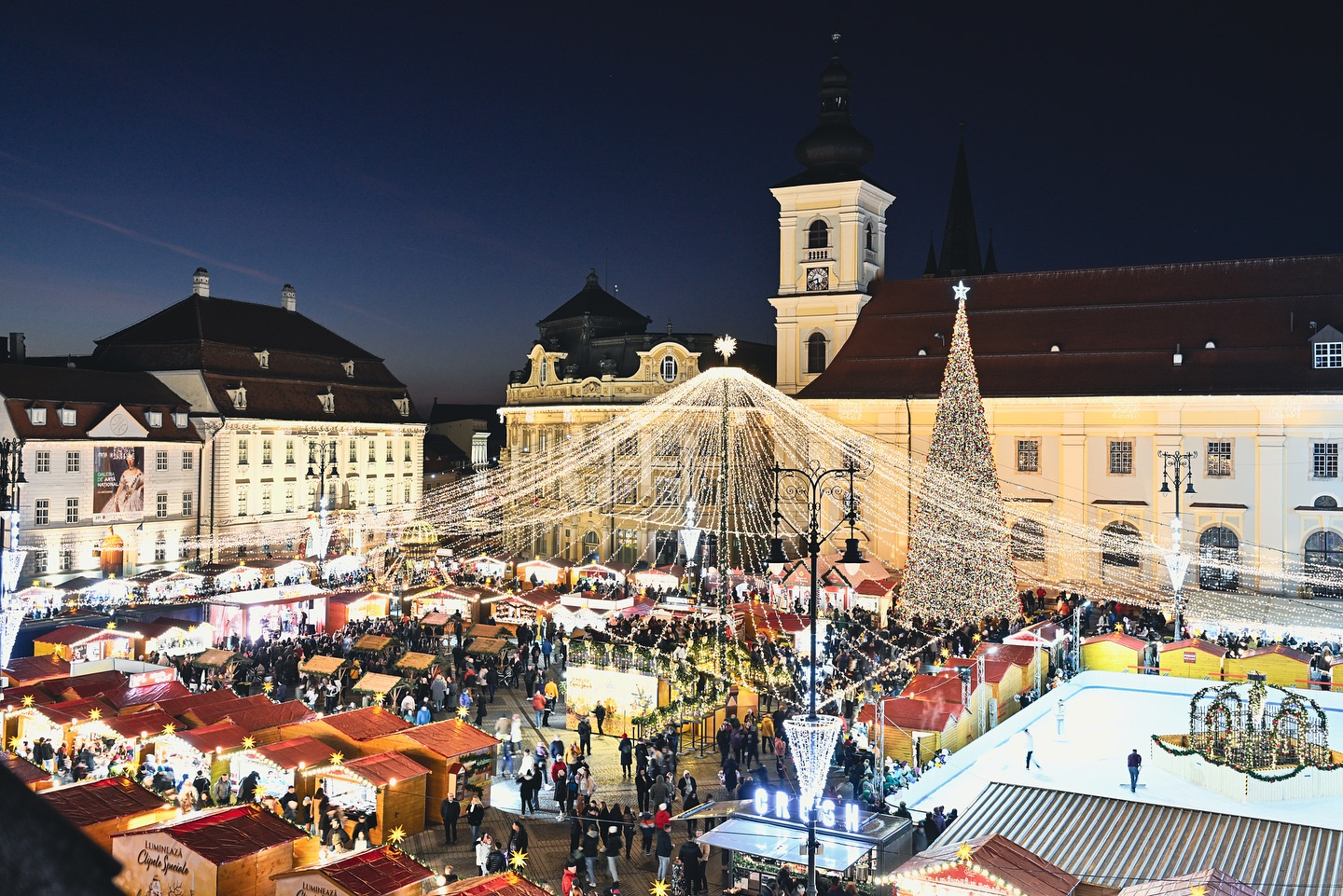
The Sibiu Christmas Market in Piața Mare, Sibiu, illuminated at night.

The Sibiu Christmas Market (Romanian: Târgul de Crăciun din Sibiu) is an annual Christmas market held in the Grand Square (Piața Mare) of Sibiu, Romania. Established in 2007, it was the first Christmas market in the country and has since become one of Romania's most visited and photographed winter events.

Unlike other Christmas markets in Romania, the Sibiu Christmas Market operates without direct public funding. It is financed through vendor participation fees and private sponsorships.

== Media coverage ==
The Sibiu Christmas Market has received significant media coverage:

- In 2019, The New York Times highlighted the market in a travel feature, describing it as "adding sparkle to an ancient city", praising its “authentic atmosphere” and noting its “growing popularity among European tourists”.
- On 19 December 2024, a photograph of the market in Piața Mare was selected as the daily background image on Bing Wallpaper.
- The event appeared in Euronews Travel, which listed Sibiu among Europe's top winter destinations.
- Romania Insider featured the market's 2024 opening and visitor numbers.

== See also ==
- Christmas in Romania
- List of Christmas markets
- Sibiu
