= Christmas in Romania =

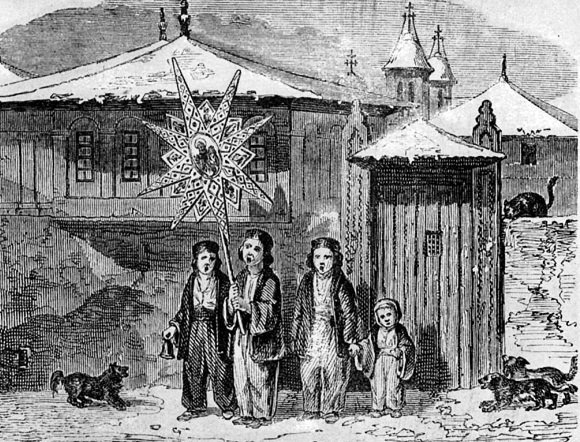
- Christmas carollers in Bucharest, 1842
- Official name: Crăciun
- Observed by: Romania
- Significance: in memory of the birth of Jesus
- Celebrations: Christmas tree decorations, church services
- Date: 25 December
- Next time: 25 December 2026
- Frequency: annual
- Related to: Advent

Christmas in Romania (Romanian: Crăciun, pronounced [krəˈtʃjun]) is a major annual celebration, celebrated on 24/25 of December, as in most countries of the Christian world. The observance of Christmas was introduced once with the Christianization of Romania, but public observance was discouraged during the communist period (1948–1989). In post-communist Romania, Christmas started being celebrated again more festively.

The Christmas and holiday season starts officially on December 6, on Saint Nicholas Day, and ends on January 7, with the celebration of Saint John. Other major holidays in this period are the Great Union Day, Saint Ignatius's Day, Christmas Eve (Ajunul Crăciunului in Romanian), Christmas Day (Crăciun in Romanian), Saint Stephen's day, New Year's Eve (Revelion in Romanian), and the Epiphany.

== Advent ==
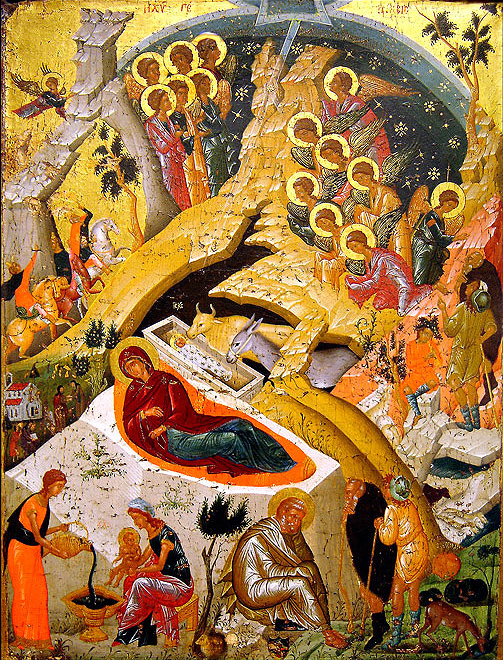
An icon representing the Nativity of Jesus

The seven-week Advent season in anticipation of Jesus Christ's birth is obligatory for all Eastern Christian Romanians. It starts on November 14 yearly and ends up on Christmas Day. November 14, the first day of the Advent, is traditionally called Lăsata secului (literally: the day the abstinence begins). Any kind of products obtained from animal sources are prohibited. Also, on Wednesdays and on Fridays, oil among other products is not to be eaten. Some special days (for example: Saint Ignatius Day or Great Union Day) occur during the period when Christians are allowed to eat fish or dairy. The Christmas Eve should be a day of total abstinence to thank God for sending The Savior. All said, there are forty days of Advent (seven to nine of them being exceptions), this being the second abstinence period as length during the Romanian religious year, after the Easter advent.

During this season, the Christmas holiday season in Romania starts with Saint Andrew's Day, on November 30. Customs say everyone should hang plenty of garlic and a crucifix next to all doors and windows on the mansion to keep evil spirits and spells away from their home. Strigoi or vampires may appear during the night between November 29 and November 30 as this night is popularly known as Noaptea lupului (literally: Night of the wolf).

The next day, December 1, is the Great Union Day (Ziua Marii Uniri), the National Day of Romania. It is celebrated by all Romanians. In Bucharest and Alba Iulia, Romanian Armed Forces have parades, showing their Land and Air vehicles and performing the Romanian national anthem "Deșteaptă-te, române!", used for the Union back in 1918. People are given free mititei and fasole cu cârnați while they party into the night. Free music concerts and street festivals are organised annually in every Romanian city. There are also numerous television specials, most notably those broadcast by Pro TV, that bring famous or important Romanians into the spotlight. The day usually ends with fireworks.

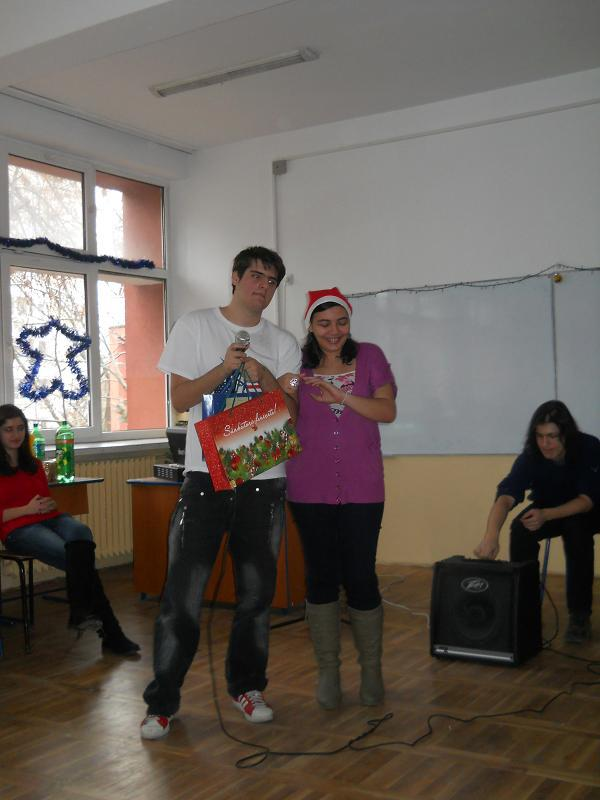
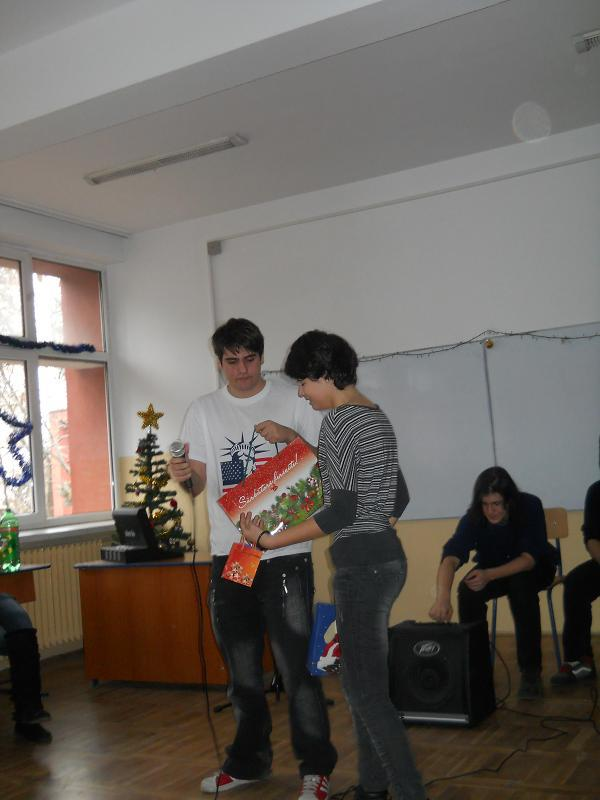
Children exchanging gifts during Secret Santa, a Romanian custom for Saint Nicholas Day

At the beginning of December, the Christmas lights are turned on all over the streets. During the same period, Moş Nicolae comes and gives children presents. Children receive their gifts early in the morning of December 6 or late at night on December 5; traditionally, the gifts are put in their laced-up boots. Children are usually given sweets or books; if they have been naughty, they get wooden sticks.

On December 20, Saint Ignatius Day, Romanians start the last preparations for Christmas. On this date, they cut pigs for the Christmas Eve supper. Around this date, people usually buy their Christmas trees from public markets or supermarkets.

On December 24, Christmas Eve - Noaptea de Ajun - is traditionally the day children usually start caroling their neighbors. On the same date, women bake traditional cookies to give children for their caroling. By that time, the Christmas tree is usually already decorated. Those more pious attend the Royal Hours and the afternoon Divine Liturgy before preparing for dinner.

== Christmas music ==
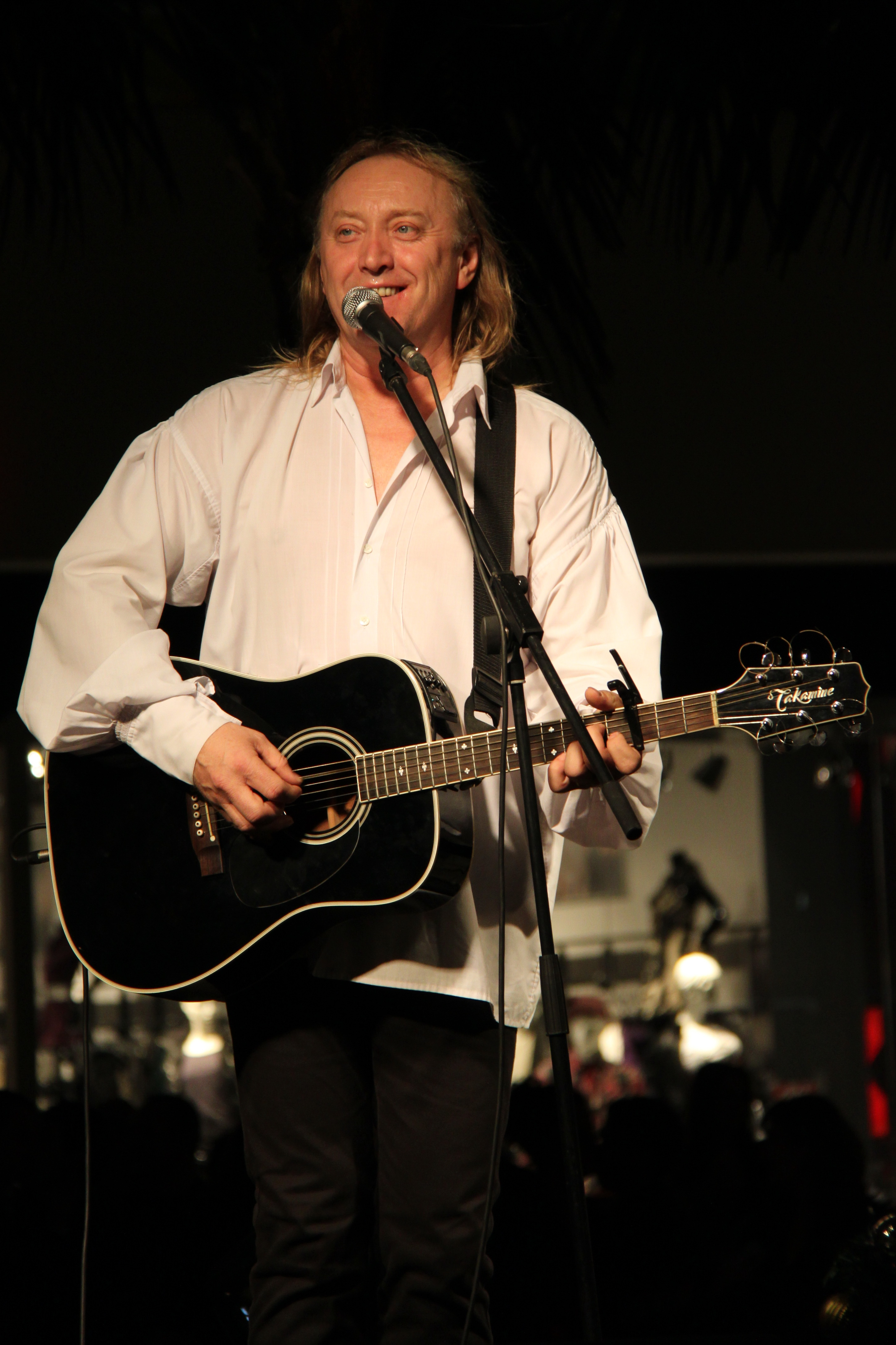
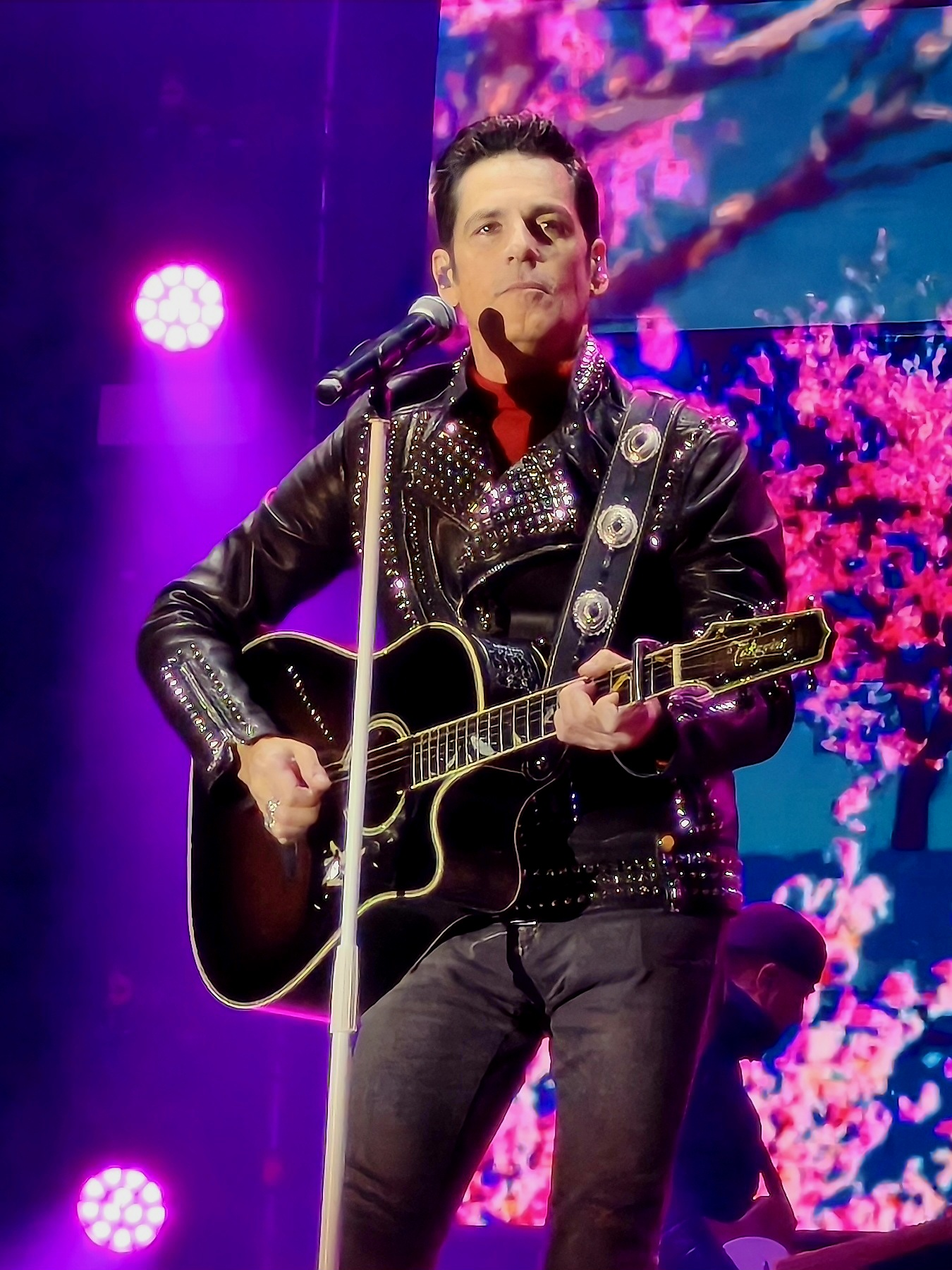
Ștefan Hrușcă and Ștefan Bănică Jr. are popular figures in Romanian Christmas music.

Music is an important part of Christmas celebration all over Romania. There is a special genre of music, related to Christmas carols but with more traditional / Christian lyrics. These are named colindă. Although the text of all colinde is concerned with the events of the Nativity, certain elements of the folk rituals performed around Christmas are probably pre-Christian in origin, having their roots in the Roman Saturnalia and pagan rituals related to the winter solstice and soil fertility. Colinde are performed in all parts of Romania (including Moldova), with regional variations in terms of the number of participants, the exact timing of different melodies and lyrics.

In traditional Romanian rural society, preparations for colinde started well in advance (sometimes weeks) before Christmas. The village youth (usually boys) would begin to form groups in different places and designate a leader to practice singing in unison. These groups are called cete de colindători, and their numbers vary from region to region.

Then, starting on Christmas Eve, the groups would go to different houses and begin singing. In some villages, they go first to the mayor's house, followed by the teacher's house, whereas in other parts there is no pre-established order. The families would then invite them into the house and give them different small gifts such as nuts, dried fruits, and pretzels. There are also adaptations from international hit carols into Romanian, for example: "Noapte de vis" (from "Silent Night") or "O, brad frumos!" (from "O Tannenbaum").

Examples of colinde with religious subject are "Astăzi s-a născut Hristos" (Today Christ Was Born), "O, ce veste minunată!" (Oh, What Wonderful News!), "Trei păstori" (Three Shepherds), "Trei crai de la răsărit" (The Three Magi from the East), "Steaua" (The Star) or "Sus la poarta Raiului" (Up at Heaven's Gate). The first two ones talk about the Nativity of Jesus; the first one encourages people to pray to Jesus and thank Him for being born, while the second one informs us about how Christ was born and praises Mary. The other ones tell the stories of the Three Shepherds, the Three Magi and the Christmas star. The latter one, "Sus la poarta Raiului", is a portrait of the Manger during Jesus' nativity.

Apart from the religious songs, there are also many other original colinde about subjects like Joy, Prosperity, or Caroling itself – for example: "Moş Crăciun cu plete dalbe" (White-Haired Santa Claus), "Colindiţa", "Pluguşorul", or "Scoală gazdă" (Awaken, Host). The first one talks to us about Moş Crăciun (literary Old Father Christmas, who is, in fact, Santa Claus) and his act of bringing presents to nice children on Christmas Day. The third and fourth ones are about specific Romanian customs intended to provide and maintain health or prosperity; they count some reasons for Caroling. The last one tells the story of a family where the mother was not able to cook a colăcuț (special Christmas pastry). They ask the host to whom they perform the colind to give them a colăcuț, claiming their mother did not have the tools and ingredients to make it. As we can figure out, the song was originally performed after New Year, as they claim that "When the oven started working, the New Year had already arrived! [sic]"

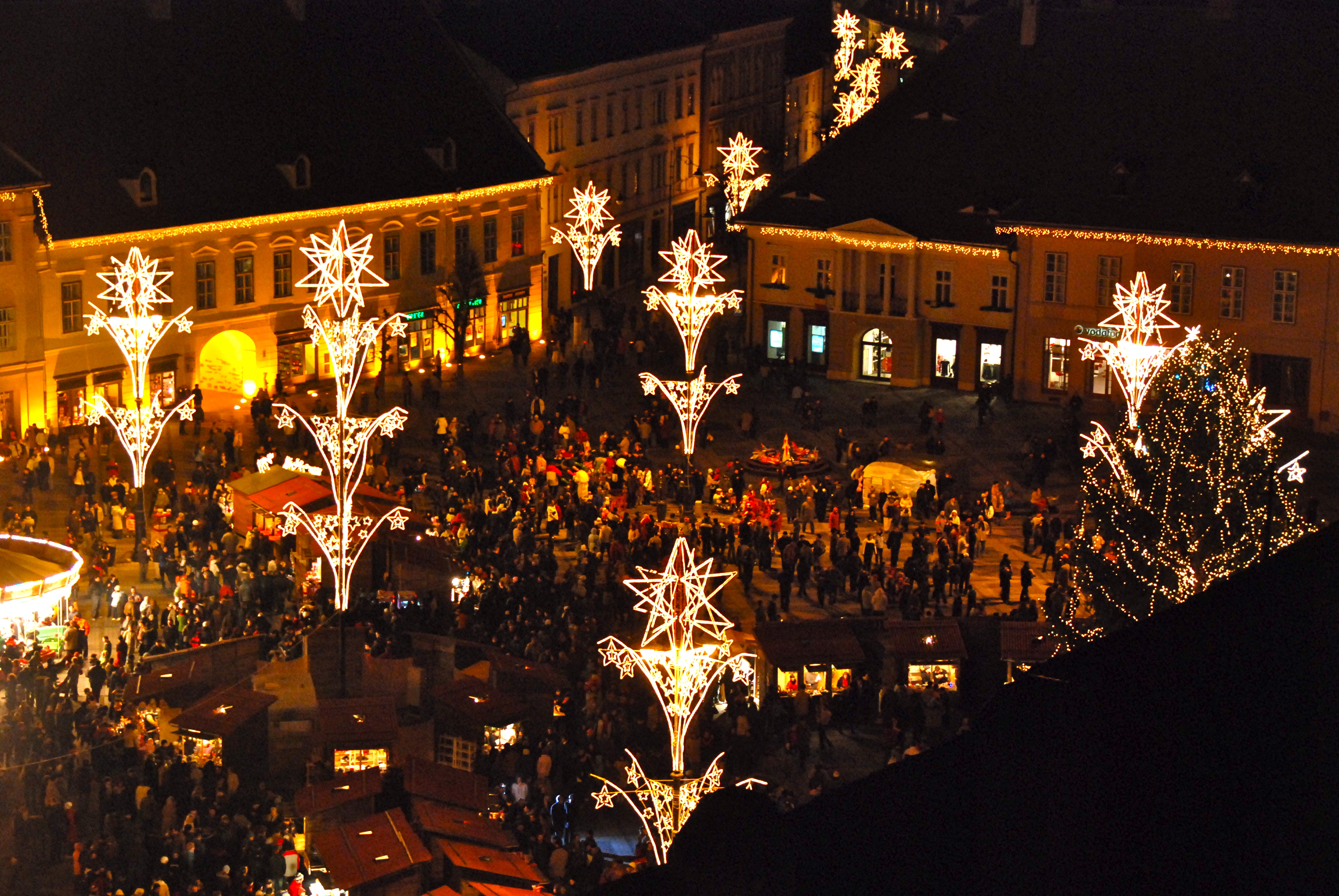
Christmas market in Sibiu, Transylvania

Many folklore musicians covered, re-mastered or did renditions to those songs, some of them being well-known artists, such as Maria Tănase. Beyond traditional music, mainstream artists have also involved themselves in Christmas culture. One example is the Madrigal choir, who covered over 20 carols. Ștefan Hrușcă is another Christmas music alumni, holding Christmas nationwide tours in late November yearly. He had also covered hundreds of songs and put them on at least three Christmas albums. Rock & Roll singer-songwriter and actor Ștefan Bănică Jr. has a now-traditional concert series to honor Christmas, ever since 2002. They are called Împreună de Crăciun / Concert extraordinar de Craciun and take place at Sala Palatului in Bucharest. He also released a Christmas album including the top ten smash hit "Doar o dată e Crăciunul" (Christmas Is Only Once).

Singer Paula Seling also has several Christmas compilations — "Colinde și cântece sfinte" (out 1998), "Albumul de Crăciun" (out 2002), "De Sărbători" (out 2006), and more lately "A mai trecut un an" (Another Year Over) (out 2010). She released three music videos to promote the albums for the songs "O, ce veste minunată!", "Trei păstori", and "A mai trecut un an".

R&B singer Andra also released a Christmas album in 2007, entitled "Vis de iarnă" (Winter Dream). The title single benefited from a music video in which Andra is traveling home to gather with her family for Christmas. Singer Elena Gheorghe also covered the song "Silent Night", and alongside band Mandinga released a Christmas album, "De Crăciun".

Pop music duo André also released a Christmas EP in late 2000. It is entitled "Noapte de Vis", and it contains both Christmas-related song and other songs. The title single is also known as "Moşule, ce tânăr eşti!" (How young you are, Santa!), and it was described more as a dance-pop club hit than as a Christmas song, even peaking at number-one on the Romanian Top 100.

In late 2009, Bănică Jr. starred in a Christmas movie — "Ho, Ho, Ho!". Its soundtrack was released in the same year, and it featured Christmas-related songs, including the Top 100 single "Ho, Ho, Ho!". It was released under MediaPro Music. Label fellow Horia Brenciu also had some Christmas hits in the Airplay Chart, such as "Noapte de Crăciun". Also in 2009, worldwide house sensation Inna released an A Side / B side digital single containing a cover of "O, ce veste minunată!" and an original recording, "I Need You for Christmas". The latter one became the only Romanian Christmas song to break the borders as it entered the Russian Airplay Chart and the UK Singles Chart, in addition to Romanian Top 100. In 2011, LaLa Band premiered a Christmas album on December 1.

Numerous Christmas compilations have been released in Romania, such as the "I Need You for Christmas" series. Since 2008, radio station Magic FM has exclusively broadcast Christmas songs in December (usually from December 1 to December 27); they call themselves "Santa Claus's Radio Station".

Since 2010, a special Airplay Chart has been shown yearly - Holiday Airplay Chart. Moreover, as a result of the season, Mariah Carey scored four entries in the same week in December 2010 on the Romanian Top 100, with "Silent Night", "Santa Claus Is Coming to Town", "All I Want for Christmas Is You", and "Oh Santa!", all charted simultaneously (the record had been previously held by Michael Jackson after his death in 2009, but it was once again broken in 2011 by Rihanna with five entries). Christmas albums are also record-breakers. In 2010, Carey's album "Merry Christmas II You" had broken all records by selling over 10,000 albums in one week. The record was then broken by Lady Gaga's "Born This Way", just to be broken once again by another Christmas album in 2011, when Justin Bieber's "Under the Mistletoe" sold over 12,000 units in one week. It was later on broken by yet another Christmas album, this time by Michael Bublé, simply entitled "Christmas" - an album that sold over 15,000 copies in a singular week; it has been one of the biggest-selling albums, with over 30,000 units sold in less than a month and a half.

== Christmas food ==
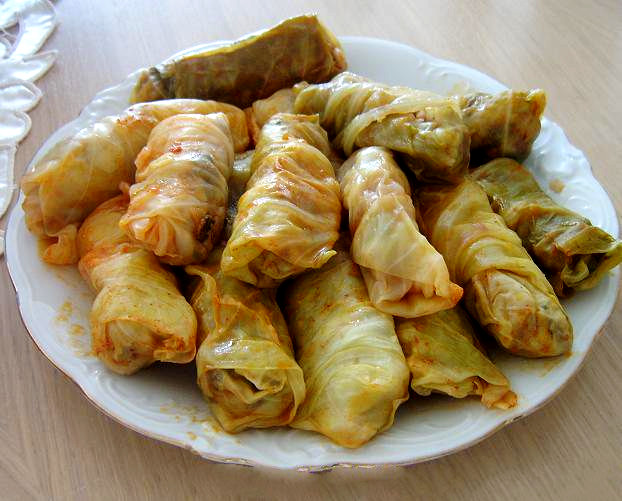
Sarmale in pickled cabbage leaves

During Christmas, Romanians bake or buy various special dishes, including desserts and sweets. Romanians most usually bake cozonac, a kind of Panettone made of flour, yolks, yeast, and many other ingredients, flavors, condiments and additions. There are several types of spongecakes, with hundreds of recipes. You can either knead it for hours to be ready in 6 hours, or you can let it rise for 1 hour to avoid kneading it. You can fill the sponge cake with walnuts, cocoa, raisins, Turkish delight, and in Transylvania with poppy seed paste (cozonac cu mac). Plates heaped with small pastries and cakes (such as cornuri and baclava) are prepared to serve to carollers when they call.

A molded vegetable and chicken salad held together with mayonnaise and decorated with olives and boiled eggs is often prepared. It is called salată de boeuf (a name derived from French), although it usually does not contain beef.

Other Christmas dishes include piftie, sarmale, and pork dishes.

== See also ==
- Christmas worldwide
- Public holidays in Romania
