= O, ce veste minunată! =

Romanian Christmas carol

O, ce veste minunată is a traditional Christmas carol, sung primarily in Romanian-speaking communities and countries. Like other folk songs, there are many versions of it; for instance, some have "Viflaim" for Bethlehem, some have "S-a născut Mesia" (The Messiah was born). The most common arrangement is the 3-stanza harmonization by the ethnomusicologist Dumitru Kiriac-Georgescu (1866–1928).

== Lyrics ==
The lyrics and melody of this song are public domain.

=== Romanian ===
O, ce veste minunată!
Lângă Betleem se arată
Cerul strălucea, îngerii veneau
Pe-o rază curată.

Că la Betleem Maria,
Săvârșind călătoria
Într-un mic sălaș, lângă-acel oraș,
A născut pe Mesia.

Pe Fiul în al Său nume,
Tatăl L-a trimis în lume.
Să se nască, și să crească,
Să ne mântuiască.

=== Literal English ===
O what wonderful news!
Is shown to us in Bethlehem!
Today has been born, the One without a beginning,
As the Prophets foretold!

That in Bethlehem Mary,
Having completed the trip,
In a little space, near that town,
She bore the Messiah

His Son in God's Own Name,
The Father has sent into the world!
To be born and to grow,
To save us all!

== Recordings ==
- Angela Gheorghiu album Colinde românești
- Dana Dragomir album 'Frost' 2014
- Dalma Kovacs
- Elena Gheorghe
- Paula Seling
- Ștefan Bănică Jr.
- Inna (released with "I Need You for Christmas")
- Lucy Monciel

== See also ==
- List of Christmas carols
