= Nelu Ploieșteanu =

Romanian musician (1950–2021)

- Born: Ion Dumitrache; 16 December 1950; Ciorani, Prahova Region, Romania
- Died: 2 April 2021 (aged 70); Bucharest, Romania
- Occupations: Lăutar, fiddler and singer

Ion Dumitrache (16 December 1950 – 2 April 2021), artistically and commonly known as Nelu Ploieșteanu, was a Romanian lăutar, singer and fiddler of lăutărească music. He was born on 16 December 1950 in Ciorani, in the Prahova Region (now in the Prahova County), in Romania. Already at age 6, he played the accordion, and at age 17, he played music for money for the first time on a piano at a wedding. He moved to Bucharest in 1970 and worked for 6 months at the Ion Vasilescu Magazine Theater.

His artistic career expanded in 1979 when Dumitrache went on a tour to France, Belgium and the Netherlands. After this, more tours to countries such as Germany, Italy and Spain followed. He went on a final international tour in Germany in 1996 and, after that, he stayed in Romania. Dumitrache released a total of 30 albums during his lifetime. He also collaborated with famous actors such as Gheorghe Dinică or Ștefan Iordache and sang for the Ceaușescu family and for the former Presidents of Romania Ion Iliescu and Traian Băsescu.

Ion Dumitrache was married to Elena Dumitrache, with whom he had four daughters and one son. The latter was Mihăiță Dumitrache, who suffered from spastic quadriplegia and died on 21 April 2018 at the age of 32.

Dumitrache sang publicly for the last time on 8 March 2021, in Slănic-Moldova. After this, he was hospitalized at the Floreasca Hospital in Bucharest after being diagnosed with COVID-19 and died there on 2 April. His family claimed that the hospital had mistreated Dumitrache and left him "like a dog", saying they intended to sue the hospital.
