= Aurelian Andreescu =

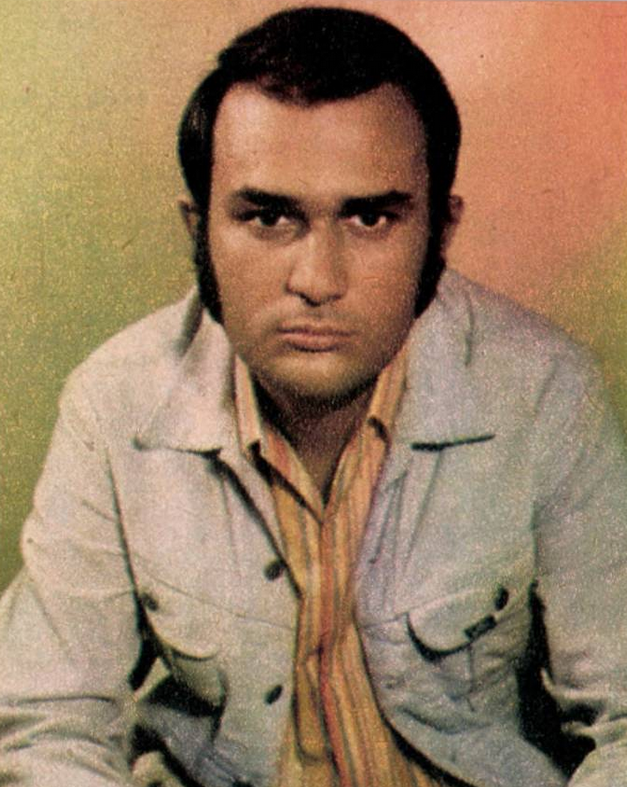
- Andreescu in 1980

Background information
- Born: 12 May 1942; Bucharest, Romania
- Died: 22 July 1986 (aged 44) Constanța, Romania
- Genres: Folk, Jazz
- Occupation: Singer
- Instrument: Vocals
- Years active: 1963-1986
- Labels: Electrecord

Aurelian Andreescu (Romanian pronunciation: [ˌa.ureliˈan andreˈesku]; 12 May 1942 in Bucharest – 22 July 1986 in Constanța) was a Romanian singer. He is considered by some the greatest voice in Romanian history.

He graduated from the Faculty of Architecture. Initially, he worked in a design office, but at the urging of friends, he appeared in 1963 in the TV program "Looking for a star". In the same year he won at the National Music Festival in Mamaia. Over the next two years he sang mainly in bars and night clubs in Bucharest.

In 1965 he joined the team of the Constantin Tănase theater, with whom he went on numerous tours, singing in the socialist countries, but also in Germany, Austria and Belgium.

He was part of the Romanian team, with Aura Urziceanu and Mihaela Mihai, winners of the European Cup contest organised in Knokke, Belgium, in 1971.

In 1973, the weekly cultural magazine Săptămîna recognized him as the most popular singer in Romanian history.

He died of a heart attack. A festival for young singers held in Bucharest since 1993 bears his name. Mihai Trăistariu was discovered after performing at this festival.

== Discography ==
- Succese internaționale (1973, Electrecord)
- Cele mai frumoase melodii (1986, Electrecord)
- Aurelian Andreescu (2002)
- Aurelian Andreescu. Muzică de colecție (2007, Jurnalul Național)
