= Laura Stoica =

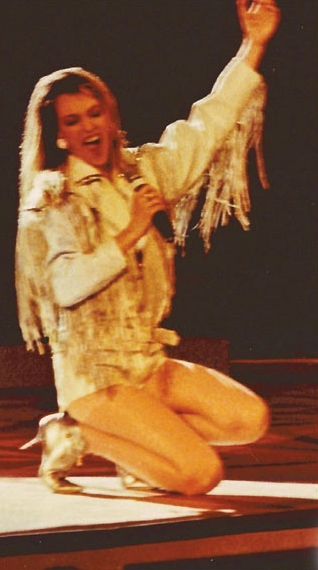

Background information
- Born: Adriana-Laurenția Stoica; 10 October 1967; Alba Iulia, Alba County, Romania
- Died: 9 March 2006 (aged 38) Sinești, Ialomița County, Romania
- Genres: Pop rock, soft rock, pop, schlager
- Occupations: Singer, songwriter, actress
- Instrument: Vocals
- Years active: 1987–2006
- Labels: Romagram, Edgar Surin Records, Calavis Music Company, TVR Media, Roton
- Website: laurastoica.ro

Adriana-Laurenția "Laura" Stoica (10 October 1967 – 9 March 2006) was a Romanian pop rock singer, composer and actress. She is often considered the best female rock vocalist and one of the most important figures of the local Romanian music scene. Between 1990 and 2005, Stoica recorded 4 studio albums, she performed in over 700 shows in her country and abroad, and had over 650 television appearances.

== Biography ==
In 1986, Laura graduates from the "Popular Arts School" in Târgoviște with a degree in classic canto. Laura debuts as a singer in 1987 at the Youth Trophy Festival in Amara, where she wins the second place for solo singing. Afterwards, she participates at most of the major new-talent contests held in Romania and has her first tour (with Semnal M and Riff). In 1989, she gets a one-year singing contract at "Toma Caragiu" Theatre in Ploiești.

Laura Stoica becomes famous in Romania after winning the great trophy and the first place for solo singing in 1990 at the Mamaia Festival, with Dă, Doamne, cântec ("Give Us Music, Lord"), a song written by Viorel Gavrilă. Romanian Radio Broadcasting Company awards her the debut prize in 1990. The next year, Laura records Un actor grăbit ("An Actor in a Hurry"), written by Bogdan Cristinoiu, which becomes the Romanian song of the year and Laura wins the award for the best female pop voice of 1991. In 1992, Laura releases Un actor grăbit as a single and then participates at the Golden Stag Festival in Brașov, where she wins the first prize in the discography section and the third prize for live singing. During the festival, she also releases her next major hit, Focul ("The Fire"), written by her and Răzvan Mirică.

In 1993, Laura Stoica Band is established, to support Laura in live concerts, tours, and television shows. The first line-up includes some of the most experienced Romanian pop and rock musicians: Iulian Vrabete (bass, from Holograf), Eugen Mihăescu (guitar, from Krypton), Vlady Cnejevici (keyboards, from Compact and Pasărea Colibri), Florin Ionescu (drums, from Direcția 5), and Cristian Soleanu (saxophone).

Laura's first album, Focul ("The Fire"), is released in 1994. Most of the songs from this album become major hits in Romania and have been included in many compilations since then. In the same year, she is considered the sexiest female pop singer in Romania, according to "Pop, Rock & Show" magazine. During this period, Laura succeeds to be the first woman in her native country regarded as a modern rock performer, combining her vocal abilities with her rebel attitude and looks. In 1994, 1995, and 1996, she enters the competition for song-writing at the Mamaia Festival.

Her second album, ...Nici o stea ("...No Star") is released in February 1997. Some of the songs from the new album have become well known in Romania. Afterwards, Laura wins the best female voice prize at Malta Song Festival in Malta, and the third place with her own song, În singurătate ("In Loneliness"), at the Mamaia Festival. In the same year, she enters the discography contest at the Golden Stag Festival with ...Nici o stea. Stoica's album is awarded the second place.

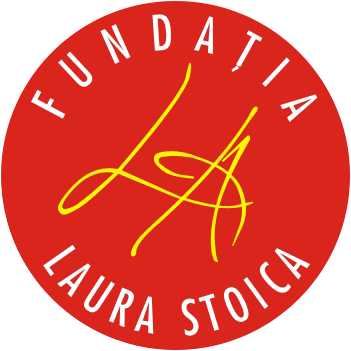
Laura Stoica's signature as seen in the official logo of the foundation created by her.

In 1998, Laura tours in Israel and participates at the Pamukkale Festival in Turkey, where she gets the jury prize. She is the best female rock vocalist of the year, according to "Bravo Romania". Laura Stoica Band has some new line-ups, which include: Remus Carteleanu (guitar), Matei Bulencea 'Căpitanu' and Paul Baciu (bass), Emanuel Gheorghe 'Fisă' and Mihai Coman (keyboards), Răzvan Lupu 'Lapi' (drums), and later, Relu Bițulescu, Andrei Bărbulescu, Răzvan Gorcinski (drums), and Fernando Drăgănici (keyboards).

In 2000, Stoica completes the recordings for her third album, entitled Vino ("Come"), but she doesn't manage to release it, due to her dropping in popularity. Vino is officially released nine years later.

In 2000, Laura graduates the "Ecological University of Bucharest" with a degree in drama. Constantin Codrescu, Vlad Rădescu and Doru Ana are her teachers during the last two years of studying. As an actress, she performs at Nottara and Odeon Theatre in Bucharest, at the National Opera Theater in Constanța, and at "Toma Caragiu" Theatre in Ploiești. In 2003, she is chosen by Disney to provide Melpomeme's voice in Romanian for the animated series Hercules.

After some minor tours and concerts in the United States of America, Stoica returns to her native country and, in 2004, she plans a comeback on the local music scene. She establishes a brand new line-up for her band: Adrian Vișteanu (guitar), Emanuel Gheorghe 'Fisă' (keyboards), Victor Miclăuș (bass), and Cristian Mărgescu (drums, who becomes her fiancé). In June 2005, she releases a new album, entitled S-a schimbat ("It Has Changed"), but the disc has only very little media coverage and gains almost no commercial success.

On 9 March 2006, Stoica and her fiancé died in a car accident near Urziceni. She was pregnant at the time. She is buried at Bellu Cemetery in Bucharest.

In the following years, the albums ...Nici o stea and Focul were reissued by the record label Roton. In 2009, Vino was published posthumously by the same label. Also, some compilation albums with her songs were released. A national music festival dedicated to Laura Stoica takes place every year in Târgoviște.

== Laura Stoica Band ==
The band was created in 1993 to support Laura Stoica in live concerts, tours, and television shows. It included some 20 rock, pop or jazz musicians:

- Iulian Vrabete – bass, backing vocals, songwriter (1993–1998)
- Eugen Mihăescu – guitar, backing vocals, songwriter (1993–1998)
- Vlady Cnejevici – keyboards, backing vocals, songwriter (1993–1998)
- Florin Ionescu – drums, backing vocals, songwriter (1993–1996)
- Cristian Soleanu – saxophone (1993–1995)
- Răzvan Lupu 'Lapi' – drums (1996–1999)
- Remus Carteleanu – guitar, backing vocals, songwriter (1998–2002)
- Matei Bulencea 'Căpitanu' – bass, backing vocals, songwriter (1998–2002)
- Mihai Coman – keyboards, backing vocals, songwriter (1999–2002)
- Relu Bițulescu – drums (1999–2000)
- Andrei Bărbulescu – drums (2000–2001)
- Fernando Drăgănici – keyboards (2001–2002)
- Răzvan Gorcinski – drums (2001–2002)
- Paul Baciu – bass (2003?)
- Adrian Vișteanu – guitar, backing vocals, songwriter (2004–2006)
- Emanuel Gheorghe 'Fisă' – keyboards, backing vocals, songwriter (1998–1999, 2004–2006)
- Victor Miclăuș – bass, backing vocals (2004–2006)
- Cristian Mărgescu – drums, backing vocals (2004–2006)
- Laura Luchian – backing vocals (2005–2006)

Session musicians and other collaborators: Alin Constanțiu (saxophone), Nicu Damalan (guitar, songwriter), Marius Bațu (backing vocals), Adrian Ordean (guitar), Răzvan Mirică (songwriter), Laurențiu Cazan (acoustic guitar), Eugen Tegu (bass), Bogdan Cristinoiu (keyboards, songwriter), Cristina Andrei (backing vocals), Bobby Stoica (songwriter), Mihai Godoroja (songwriter). Managers: Aurel Mitran, Sorin Bocerean.

== Discography ==
- Un actor grăbit ("An Actor in a Hurry") (single, 1992)
- Focul ("The Fire") (album, CD/MC, 1994) (reissued in 2008)
- ...Nici o stea ("...No Star") (album, CD/MC, 1997) (reissued in 1999 and 2006)
- Vino ("Come") (album, 2000 / CD, 2009)
- S-a schimbat ("It Has Changed") (album, CD/MC, 2005)
- Dă, Doamne, cântec ("Give Us Music, Lord") (compilation, CD/MC, 2007)
- Laura Stoica – Ediție specială ("Laura Stoica – Special Edition") (video album, DVD, 2007)
- Muzică de colecție, Vol. 62 – Laura Stoica ("Collection Music, Vol. 62 – Laura Stoica") (compilation, CD, 2008, released with Jurnalul Național newspaper)
- Colecția de aur ("The Golden Collection") (3 CD box-set, 2009, includes Focul, ...Nici o stea, and Dă, Doamne, cântec)
- Întotdeauna – Laura Stoica ("Forever – Laura Stoica") (compilation, CD/digital download, 2021)

== Bibliography ==
- Biography published at Laura Stoica official site (in Romanian)
- Moceanu, Răzvan. "Portret: 10 ani de la tragedia care a dus la moartea Laurei Stoica", Rador, 9 March 2016 (in Romanian)
- Bădulescu, Marina and Onogea, Andreea. "Documentar: In memoriam Laura Stoica – 10 ani de la moartea artistei", Agerpres, 9 March 2016 (in Romanian)
- Bădulescu, Marina and Cristea, Irina Andreea. "Documentar: 50 de ani de la nașterea artistei Laura Stoica", Agerpres, 10 October 2017 (in Romanian)
- Constantinidi, Richard. "Zoom. Artist. Autohton. Laura Stoica", ClickZoomBytes, 23 July 2011 (in Romanian)
