= Ștefan Bănică Jr. =

Romanian actor, singer, and television presenter

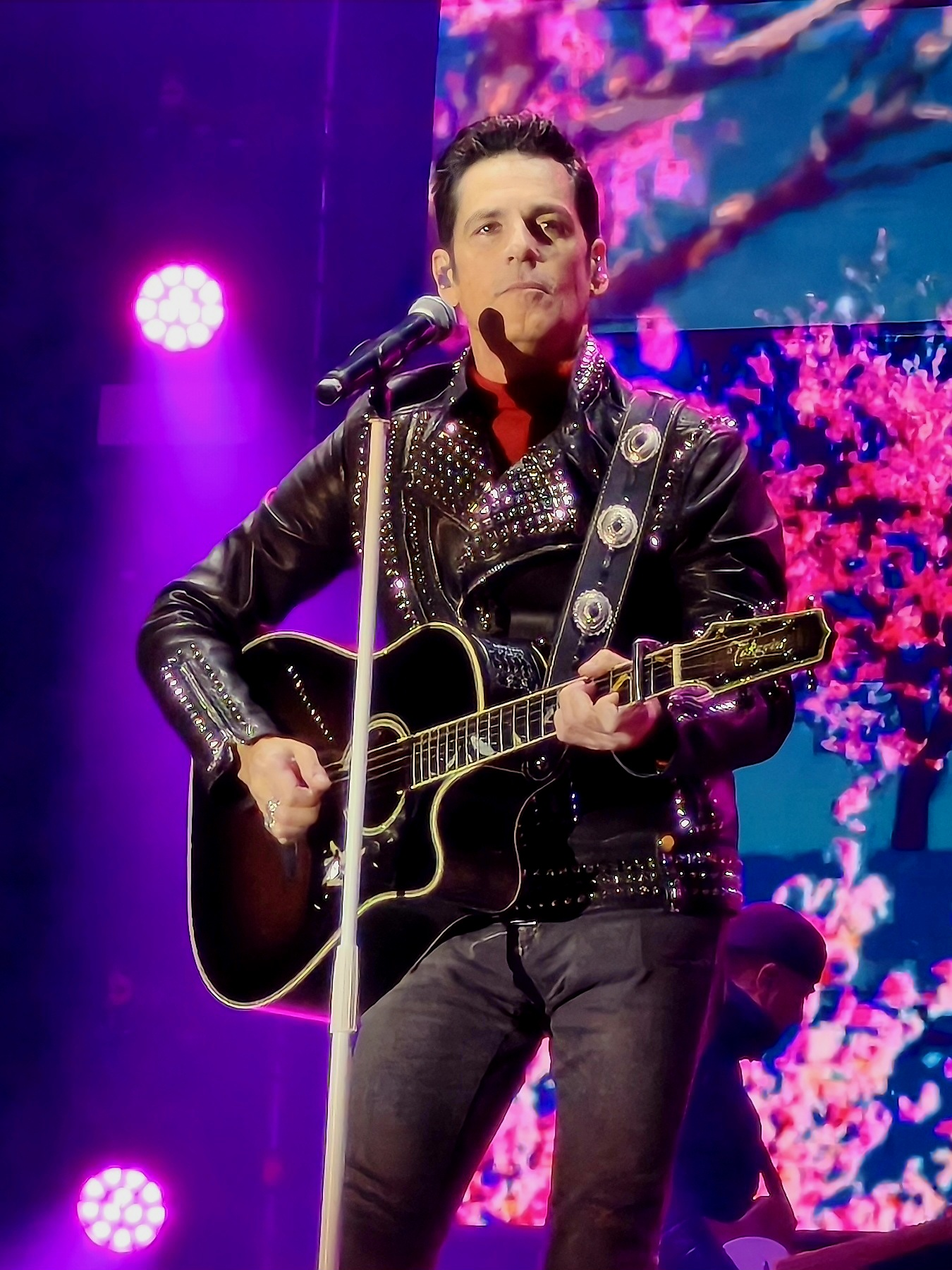
- Ștefan Bănică Jr. at the 2025 edition of Bucharest Christmas Market
- Born: October 18, 1967 (age 58); Bucharest, Romania
- Occupations: Actor; singer; television presenter
- Years active: 1984–present
- Spouses: Mihaela Rădulescu (m. 1997; div. 1999) Andreea Marin (m. 2006; div. 2013) Lavinia Pârva (m. 2017)
- Partner(s): Camelia Constantinescu (2000–2005); Lavinia Pârva (2013–2017)
- Children: 3
- Parent: Ștefan Bănică Sr.
- Website: www.stefanbanicajr.ro

Ștefan Bănică Jr. (Romanian pronunciation: [ʃteˈfan bəˈnikə]; born October 18, 1967) is a Romanian actor, singer, film director, and television presenter.

== Biography ==
Bănică was born in Bucharest to actor Ștefan Bănică Sr. and journalist Sanda Vlad-Liteanu. He graduated from the Ion Luca Caragiale High School. In his early career, he starred in multiple successful romance films (Liceenii, Liceenii Rock'n'Roll). He is well-known in Romania for presenting Dansez pentru tine, the most long-lived dance competition ever aired in the country – broadcast on Pro TV, as well as for his current role as a talent judge on the Romanian X Factor – broadcast on Antena 1. He is the father of the singer Radu Ștefan Bănică, born on February 7, 2002, also in Bucharest. He has another child, Ana Violeta Bănică, born on December 15, 2007.

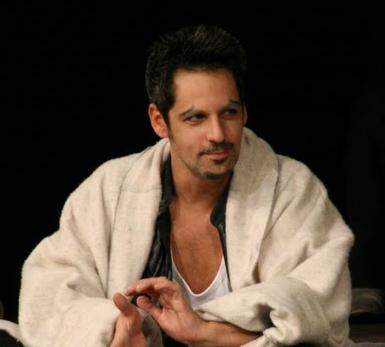
Bănică in the play "Revizorul" (2007)

Later, he concentrated on television acting, playing the character of Ciupanezu in the TV series Băieți buni ("Good Guys"), which aired on Pro TV in 2005. That same year, Bănică also played the role of Billy Flynn in the Romanian stage version of the musical Chicago at the National Theatre in Bucharest.

He released several rock music albums and successfully toured the country. In January 2006, he married television producer and show host Andreea Marin. In January 2013, they announced their divorce on amicable terms. They have a daughter together.
