= X Factor (Romanian TV series) =

Romanian television music talent show

- Created by: Simon Cowell
- Presented by: Răzvan Simion (1–7, 9-10); Dani Oțil (1–7, 9-10); Mihai Bendeac (8); Vlad Drăgulin (8); Mihai Morar (11); Adelina Chivu (11)
- Judges: Mihai Morar (1); Paula Seling (1); Adrian Sînă (1); Delia Matache (2–11); Dan Bittman (2–3); Cheloo (2–3); Horia Brenciu (4–8); Ștefan Bănică Jr. (4–11); Carla's Dreams (6–8); Loredana Groza (9–10); Florin Ristei (9–10); Marius Moga (11); Puya (11)
- Country of origin: Romania
- Original language: Romanian
- No. of seasons: 11
- No. of episodes: 200

Production
- Running time: 60–140 mins (inc. adverts)
- Production companies: FremantleMedia; Syco

Original release
- Network: Antena 1
- Release: 17 September 2011 – 27 April 2025

Related
- eXtra Factor; Franchise

X Factor was a Romanian television music talent show contested by aspiring pop singers drawn from public auditions based on The X Factor series. It was broadcast on the Antena 1 channel in Romania.

The competition is open to both solo artists and groups and has no upper age limit. Each judge is assigned one of four categories (three in the first five seasons); the criteria for each has varied between seasons. Throughout the live shows, the judges act as mentors to their category, helping to decide song choices, styling, and staging, while judging contestants from the other categories; they also compete to ensure that their act wins the competition, thus making them the winning judge.

The original judging panel line-up in 2011 consisted of Adrian Sînă, Paula Seling, and Mihai Morar. In May 2012, it was announced that Morar, Sînă, and Seling had all left and would not be returning for the second season. On 15 June, before auditions began, Dan Bittman, Delia Matache and Cheloo were confirmed as the three new judges. When the show was revived in 2014, Bittman and Cheloo were replaced by Horia Brenciu and Ștefan Bănică, Jr. On 12 July 2016 it was announced that Carla's Dreams will join the jury panel as the fourth judge. Horia Brenciu and Carla's Dreams were replaced in 2020 with Loredana Groza and season 3 winner, Florin Ristei. In season 11, Ristei and Loredana were replaced by Puya and Marius Moga.

== Format ==
The competition is split into four categories: Girls, Boys, Groups and Singers over 25 years. Before the Judges' houses stage each judge got one category which they mentored.

=== Stages for season 1-3 ===
There were 5 stages to X Factor competition:

- Stage 1: Pre-auditions (open auditions where producers decided who will perform in front of the judges)
- Stage 2: Auditions (filmed auditions with the judges and a live audience)
- Stage 3: Eliminations (known as 'Bootcamp' in the UK version)
- Stage 4: Judges' houses
- Stage 5: Live shows
Cities that auditions and/or pre-auditions were held in.

=== Stages for season 4-5 ===
There were 5 stages to the competition:

- Stage 1: Producers' auditions (these auditions decided who will sing in front of the judges)
- Stage 2: Judges' auditions
- Stage 3: Six-chair challenge
- Stage 4: The Duels
- Stage 5: Live shows (finals)

=== Stages for season 6 onwards ===
There were 5 stages to the competition:

- Stage 1: Producers' auditions (these auditions decided who will sing in front of the judges)
- Stage 2: Judges' auditions
- Stage 3: Four-chair challenge
- Stage 4: The Duels
- Stage 5: Live shows (finals)

=== Auditions ===
The filming began at this stage. The acts who got a phone call from the producers after the pre-auditions were invited to take part in the actual auditions with the judges and a live audience. They sang one or two songs and then the judges vote. These who got through would participate in Eliminations.

=== Eliminations ===
Originally known as Bootcamp. Each act who received at least two yeses from the judges during the auditions took part in the Eliminations stage, which lasted for two days. Here the contestants were allocated to their categories. Each category sang one song and then the judges decides who left the competition and who stayed in the selection process. Remaining acts had to prepare with a help of the vocal coaches one chosen song that they performed in front of the panel. Then the judges chose five acts from each category that got through to the Judges' houses stage. Both the judges and the contestants found out which judge would be mentoring which category.

=== Judges' houses ===
This stage lasted for two days. The acts visited their mentors' homes. Each judge pciked up a guest judge who would help them. Each contestant sang one song. Then the mentor and the guest judge decided which three acts would take part in the live shows in the studio. In season four, these stages of the competition were replaced by a new stage called "The Six-Chair Challenge", first introduced in the US version of the series. After the Six-chair challenge, each mentor had six contestants for the Duels. The contestants were not told who they were up against until the day of the Duels. Each contestant sang a song of their own choice, back to back, and each duel concluded with the respective mentor eliminating one of the two contestants; the three winners for each mentor advanced to the Live shows.

=== Wildcard ===
A new element was added in season 4; mentors were given one "steal", allowing each mentor to select one individual who was eliminated during the Bootcamp by another mentor.

=== Live shows ===
The finals consisted of two shows: during the first each act performed one, or later in the series twice, and the second show was the results show, where the public vote. The judges mentored a category, where they were responsible for three final acts each.

During the first live broadcast each of the contestants performed one song in front of a studio audience and the judges, usually all the contestants sang live to a backing track. Some performances were accompanied by choreography and instruments. After the song, the judges commented on the performance, and often there was some competition between the judges' views. The lines for voting opened immediately after all the contestants have performed. When there are just 4 or 5 acts left, the format changed a little, with two songs performed by each act. Three acts remained until the grand final where the public vote alone chooses the winner of the season.

==== Performances ====
The show was primarily concerned with identifying a potential pop star or star group, and singing talent, appearance, personality, stage presence and dance routines were all important elements of the contestants' performances. In the initial live shows, each act performed once in the first show in front of a studio audience and the judges, usually singing over a pre-recorded backing track. Dancers were also commonly featured. Acts occasionally accompanied themselves on guitar or piano. Each live show has had a different theme; each contestant's song was chosen according to the theme. After each act had performed, the judges commented on their performance. Heated disagreements, usually involving judges defending their contestants against criticism, were a regular feature of the show. Once all the acts had appeared, the phone lines opened and the viewing public voted on which act they wanted to keep. Once the number of contestants had been reduced to five (season 1), or six (season 2), each act would perform twice in the performances show. This continued until only three acts remained. These acts went on to appear in the grand final which decided the overall winner by public vote.

==== Results ====
Before the results were announced, the results show occasionally began with a group performance from the remaining contestants. However, the song was pre-recorded and the contestants mimed, due to problems with the number of microphones. The two acts polling the fewest votes were revealed. Both these acts performed again in a "final showdown", and the judges voted on which of the two to send home. They were able to pick new songs to perform in the "final showdown". "Double elimination" took place in some of the results show, where the bottom three acts were revealed and the act with the fewest votes was automatically eliminated, and the two with the next fewest votes performed in the "final showdown" as normal.

Ties were possible as there were four judges voting on which of the two to send home. In the event of a tie the result went to deadlock, and the act who came last in the public vote was sent home. The actual number of votes cast for each act was not revealed, nor even the order. However, a twist occurred in season two where the rankings of the acts based on the public vote for the week were revealed after the eliminations on the show. Once the number of contestants had been reduced to four, the act which polled the fewest votes was automatically eliminated from the competition (the judges did not have a vote; their only role was to comment on the performances).

In the final episode the three remaining acts sang two songs, including one performed with an invited music star. The viewers chose the winner by SMS voting or phoning. The winner received a price of €200,000.

=== Twists ===
Season 1

The finals consist of two shows: during the first each act performs one, or later in the series twice, and the second show is the results show, where the public vote. The judges mentor a category, where they are responsible for three final acts each. During the first live broadcast each of the contestants perform one song in front of a studio audience and the judges, usually all the contestants sing live to a backing track. Some performances are accompanied by choreography and instruments. After the song, the judges comment on the performance, and often there is some competition between the judges' views. The lines for voting opens immediately after all the contestants have performed. When there are just 4 or 5 acts left, the format changes a little, with two songs performed by each act. Three acts remain until the grand final where the public vote alone chooses the winner of the series.

Season 2

Owing to the addition of four wildcard contestants, two acts were eliminated from the series' first results show. The three acts with the fewest votes were announced as the bottom three and the act with the fewest public votes was then automatically eliminated. The remaining two acts then performed in the final showdown for the judges' votes.

Season 3

The live shows underwent a change in this season. In the first three live shows, each category will have its own final showdown, the result of which is decided solely by its mentor. The outcome of the fourth show will only rely on the public vote and will have two eliminations (one of which will happen halfway through of the show, when the voting will have been frozen). Thus, the final will have four contestants (not three as in previous seasons). Two of the finalists will be eliminated halfway through the final show, when the voting will have been frozen. The winner is still determined by the public vote.

Season 4

The live shows will have a change in this season. Only four live shows will take place. In the first two live shows, each category will have its own final showdown, the result of which is decided solely by its mentor. The outcome of the third show will only rely on the public vote and will have two eliminations (one of which will happen halfway through of the show, when the voting will have been frozen). The final will have four contestants. Two of the finalists will be eliminated halfway through the final show, when the voting will have been frozen. The winner is still determined by the public vote.

== eXtra Factor ==
X Factor
- Also known as: eXtra Factor
- Genre: Improvised situation comedy
- Presented by: Ilona Brezoianu
- No. of episodes: 12

Original release
- Network: AntenaPlay; X Factor Romania YouTube channel Kaufland Romania YouTube channel
- Release: 11 September – 21 November 2020

On 10 July 2020, Antena 1 announced that the ninth season will be accompanied by an online behind-the-scenes show called eXtra Factor. The show's presenter was the actress Ilona Brezoianu, known for the role of secretary Flori from the comedy series Mangalița and the episodes were weekly published on YouTube. The first episode premiered 11 September 2020 on Kaufland Romania's YouTube channel.

== Season summary ==
Contestant in "Mihai Morar" category
Contestant in "Adrian Sînă" category
Contestant in "Paula Seling" category
Contestant in "Cheloo" category
Contestant in "Dan Bittman" category
Contestant in "Delia Matache" category
Contestant in "Horia Brenciu" category
Contestant in "Ștefan Bănică Jr" category
Contestant in "Carla's Dreams" category
Contestant in "Loredana Groza" category
Contestant in "Florin Ristei" category
Contestant in "Marius Moga" category
Contestant in "Puya" category

Season	Start	Finish	Winner	Runner-up	Third place	Fourth place	Winning mentor	Hosts	Sponsor	Judges
One	17 September 2011	1 January 2012	Andrei Leonte	Alin Văduva	Iulian Vasile	T&L	Mihai Morar	Răzvan Simion; Dani Oțil	Orange	Adrian Sînă; Paula Seling; Mihai Morar
Two	23 September 2012	23 December 2012	Tudor Turcu	Ioana Anuța	Natalia Selegean	Red	Cheloo	Răzvan Simion; Dani Oțil	Orbit Professional	Dan Bittman; Delia Matache; Cheloo
Three	22 September 2013	22 December 2013	Florin Ristei	Alex Mațaev	Mădălina Lefter	Bogdan Bratis	Delia Matache	Răzvan Simion; Dani Oțil	Orbit Professional	Dan Bittman; Delia Matache; Cheloo
Four	19 September 2014	26 December 2014	Adina Răducan	Alexandra Crișan	Trupa 69	Alessio Paddeu	Horia Brenciu	Răzvan Simion; Dani Oțil	Orange, Coca-Cola	Ștefan Bănică, Jr. Delia Matache; Horia Brenciu
Five	17 September 2015	27 December 2015	Florin Răduţă	Xenia Chitoroagă	B52	Bravissimo	Ștefan Bănică, Jr.	Răzvan Simion; Dani Oțil	Orange, Coca-Cola	Ștefan Bănică, Jr. Delia Matache; Horia Brenciu
Six	9 September 2016	23 December 2016	Olga Verbiţchi	Raul Eregep	Alex Mladin	Marcel Roșca	Carla's Dreams	Răzvan Simion; Dani Oțil	Orange, Coca-Cola	Ștefan Bănică, Jr. Delia Matache; Horia Brenciu; Carla's Dreams
Seven	8 September 2017	22 December 2017	Jeremy Ragsdale	Ad Libitum	Francesca Nicolescu	Pierluca Salvatore	Horia Brenciu	Răzvan Simion; Dani Oțil	Orange, Coca-Cola	Ștefan Bănică, Jr. Delia Matache; Horia Brenciu; Carla's Dreams
Eight	26 August 2018	23 December 2018	Bella Santiago	Ioana Bulgaru	Cristian Moldovan	Doinița Ioniță	Delia Matache	Mihai Bendeac; Vlad Drăgulin	Orange, Coca-Cola	Ștefan Bănică, Jr. Delia Matache; Horia Brenciu; Carla's Dreams
Nine	11 September 2020	18 December 2020	Andrada Precup	Sonia Mosca	Adrian Petrache	Super 4	Ștefan Bănică, Jr.	Răzvan Simion; Dani Oțil	Kaufland; Sun Wave Pharma	Ștefan Bănică Jr. Loredana Groza; Delia Matache; Florin Ristei
Ten	6 September 2021	23 December 2021	Nick Casciaro	Bryana Holingher	Andrei Duțu	Omajii	Loredana Groza	Răzvan Simion; Dani Oțil	Kaufland; Sun Wave Pharma	Ștefan Bănică Jr. Loredana Groza; Delia Matache; Florin Ristei
11	26 January 2025	27 April 2025	George Radu	Bogdan Mihai	Maia Fluture	Sweet’n’Sour	Marius Moga	Mihai Morar; Adelina Chivu	Kaufland, Tymbark, Bucovina	Ștefan Bănică Jr. Marius Moga; Delia Matache; Puya

== Judges ==
Judges

The X Factor debuted in 2011 with Romanian recording artist Adrian Sînă, pop singer Paula Seling and radio DJ Mihai Morar as the judges. When it was announced that The X Factor would return in 2012, the jury was entirely changed. In May 2012, it was announced that Morar, Sînă, and Seling had all left and would not be returning for the second season. They were replaced by Holograf singer Dan Bittman, pop singer Delia Matache and rapper Cheloo. In February 2014, rumours began circulating that Cheloo would not be returning for the fourth series, because of his aggressive behavior. When it was announced that The X Factor would return in 2014, Bittman was linked to the role. For the fourth season Bittman and Cheloo were replaced by pop singer Horia Brenciu and rock star Ștefan Bănică, Jr. In July 2016, Carla's Dreams joined the jury, making the jury panel for the first made up of 4 members. In 2020, both Carla's Dreams and Horia Brenciu would be replaced by pop-singer Loredana Groza and former winner Florin Ristei. In 2024, Ristei and Loredana were replaced by rapper Puya and composer Marius Moga.

Hosts

The show was hosted for nine seasons by Răzvan Simion and Dani Oțil, who are also known for hosting a well known morning show on Antena 1. For the eighth season, the hosts were Mihai Bendeac and Vlad Drăgulin. For the 11th season, Mihai Morar, former judge, was hired to be the host, along Adelina Chivu.

=== Timeline of judges ===
Judge	Seasons										
Judge	1	2	3	4	5	6	7	8	9	10	11
Mihai Morar											
Paula Seling											
Adrian Sînă											
Cheloo											
Dan Bittman											
Delia Matache											
Horia Brenciu											
Ștefan Bănică Jr.											
Carla's Dreams											
Loredana Groza											
Florin Ristei											
Marius Moga											
Puya											

Legend

Featured as a judge
Featured as a winner of the talent show

=== Judges' categories and their contestants ===
In each season, each judge is allocated a category to mentor and chooses small number of acts (four or five, depending on the season) to progress to the live finals. This table shows, for each season, which category each judge was allocated and which acts he or she put through to the live finals.

Key: – Winning judge/category. Winners are in bold, eliminated contestants in small font.

Series	Adrian Sînă	Paula Seling	Mihai Morar	—N/a
One				—N/a
One	**Over 25s** Alin Văduva; Iulian Vasile; Diana Hetea; Cristian Parmac	**Groups**; T&L; Duo Voice; Refresh; X-Treme	**16-24s** **Andrei Leonte**; Irina Florea; Antonia Filip; Ovidiu Nae	—N/a
Two	Dan Bittman	Delia Matache	Cheloo	—N/a
Two	**16-24s** Ioana Anuța; Iulia Manolache; Tudor Toduț; Nadir Tamuz; Ráduly Botond	**Groups**; Red; Nord X Station 4; 2B; R Family	**Over 25s** **Tudor Turcu**; Natalia Selegean; Dragoș Udilă; Ioan Mann; Iulia Glăvan	—N/a
Three	**Under 20s** Mădălina Lefter; Bogdan Bratiș; Florena Țicu Șandro; Ana-Maria Mihăieș; Ruxandra Tomulesei	**Over 20s** **Florin Ristei**; Alex Mațaev; Oana Muntean; Paolo Lagana; Dumitru Botnaru	**Groups**; Double X November; Bruiaj; Căminu' 16; Quattro	—N/a
Four	Horia Brenciu	Delia Matache	Ștefan Bănică, Jr.	—N/a
Four	**Under 20s** **Adina Răducan**; Sergiu Braga; Cristian Goaie; Monica Sannino	**Groups**; Trupa 69; Alessio Paddeu; Contrast; R-Twins	**Over 20s** Alexandra Crișan; Nicoleta Nucă; Alexandru Florea; Miruna Buză	—N/a
Five	**Groups**; B52; Bravissimo; Tomato	**Over 20s** Andrei Ioniță; Anastasia Ursu; Alex Vasilache	**Under 20s** **Florin Răduţă**; Xenia Chitoroagă; Endy Glikman; Erika Isac	—N/a
Six	Horia Brenciu	Delia Matache	Ștefan Bănică, Jr.	Carla's Dreams
Six	**Over 24s** Marcel Roşca; Loredana Anghelache	**Boys**; Raul Eregep; Alex Mladin; Emilian Nechifor	**Groups**; 3 O'Clock; Apollo	**Girls**; **Olga Verbiţchi**; Izabela Simion
Seven	**Over 24s** **Jeremy Ragsdale**; Katarina Biehu	**Girls**; Francesca Nicolescu; Teodora Sava; Alina Mocanu	**Boys**; Salvatore Pierluca; Anton Banaghan	**Groups**; Ad Libitum; Flashback
Eight	**Groups**; Vox; Diamonds	**Over 24s** **Bella Santiago**; Cristian Sanda; Cristina Vasopol	**Girls**; Ioana Bulgaru; Doinița Ioniță	**Boys**; Cristian Moldovan; Alexandru Stremițeanu
Nine	Florin Ristei	Delia Matache	Loredana Groza	Ștefan Bănică, Jr.
Nine	**Groups**; Super 4 Tiny Tigers	**Over 24s** Sonia Mosca; Alina Dincă	**Boys**; Adrian Petrache; Iulian Selea	**Girls**; **Andrada Precup**; Alexandra Sîrghi
Ten
Ten	**Girls**; Bryana Holingher; Betty Iordăchescu	**Groups**; Omajii; The Jazzy Jo Experience	**Over 24s** **Nick Casciaro**; Stefan J. Doyle	**Boys**; Andrei Duțu; Ionuț Hanțig
11	Marius Moga	Puya	Delia Matache	Ștefan Bănică, Jr.
11	**Boys**; **George Radu**; Pantaleo Fabrizio Titto; Florin Ciobanu	**Groups**; Sweet’n’Sour; Taking Back August; 4Strofa	**Girls**; Maia Fluture; Georgiana Costache; Diana Stănciuleasa	**Over 24s** Irina Serafimciuc; Ștefan Munteanu; Bogdan Mihai

== Seasons ==
The auditions for the first season were carried in May 2011. The first series of the show aired starting 17 September 2011. Auditions for producers began in Cluj-Napoca, Romania, on 14 May 2011. They then took place in Constanța, on 21 May in Timișoara on 24 May 2011, on 4 June in Iași and concluded on 11 June 2011 in Bucharest. The first season ended on 1 January 2012, Andrei Leonte (16-24s) mentored by Mihai Morar was declared the first winner of The X Factor in Romania. Alin Văduva (Over 25s) was runner-up followed by Iulian Vasile (Over 25s) in third place. Leonte won by 51.0% of the votes.

The second season of the show aired starting 23 September 2012. Auditions for producers began in Craiova, România, on 15 June 2012. They then took place in Sibiu, on 18 June in Timișoara on 21 June 2012, on 27 June in Iași and concluded on 1 July 2012 in Bucharest. In the second season the judges are Dan Bittman, Delia Matache and Cheloo. The second season ended on 23 December 2012, Tudor Turcu (Over 25s) mentored by Cheloo was declared the second winner of The X Factor in Romania. Ioana Anuța (16-24s) was runner-up followed by Natalia Selegean (Over 25s) in third place.

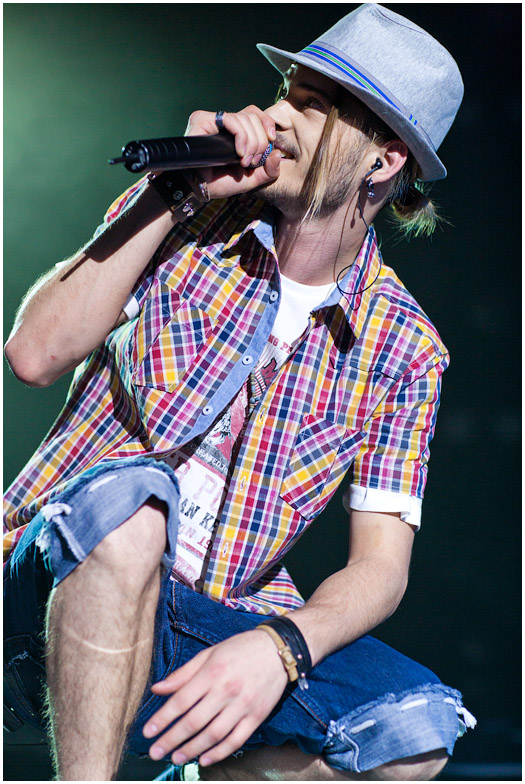
Alex Mațaev

The third season of the show aired starting on 22 September 2013. This season has the slogan "Muzică și suflet" (literally "Music and soul"). Auditions for producers began in Craiova, România, on 2 June. They then took place in Arad, on 5 June in Cluj Napoca on 8 June 2013, on 11 June in Iași, on 14 June in Constanța and concluded on 17 June 2013 in Bucharest. All three judges are returning for season 3. On 22 December 2013, the season was won by Florin Ristei, mentored by Matache. Alex Mațaev, mentored also by Matache finished in second place and in third place was Mădălina Lefter, mentored by Dan Bittman.

The fourth season of the show aired starting on 19 September 2014. The first auditions took place at Craiova, on 24 May. They then took place in Sibiu, on 26 May, in Arad, on 28 May in Cluj Napoca on 30 May 2014, on 2 June in Iași, on 5 June in Galați and concluded on 7 June 2013 in Bucharest. Singer Delia Matache returned to the judging panel, while Horia Brenciu and Ștefan Bănică, Jr. joined the panel as replacements for the departing judges.

== Reception ==
=== Television ratings ===
Seasonal rankings (based on average total viewers per episode) of X Factor on Antena 1.

Season	Season premiere	Premiere viewers (in millions)	Season finale	Finale viewers (in millions)	TV season	Rank	Source
1	17 September 2011	0.65	1 January 2012	1.26	2011–2012	2	
2	23 September 2012	1.66	23 December 2012	1.24	2012	2	
3	22 September 2013	1.59	22 December 2013	1.06	2013	2	
4	19 September 2014	1.39	26 December 2014	1.016	2014	2	
5	18 September 2015	1.01	27 December 2015	1.120	2015	2	
6	9 September 2016		23 December 2016		2016		

== Awards and nominations ==
Year	Award	Category	Recipient	Result	Source
2011	TVmania Awards	Best Talent Show	X Factor	Nominated	
2012	TVmania Awards	Best Talent Show	X Factor	Nominated	
2013	TVmania Awards	Best Talent Show	X Factor	Nominated	
2014	TVmania Awards	Best Talent Show	X Factor	Nominated	
