= X Factor (Romanian TV series) season 1 =

X Factor
- Season 1
- Hosted by: Răzvan Simion; Dani Oțil
- Judges: Adrian Sînă; Paula Seling; Mihai Morar
- Winner: Andrei Leonte
- Winning mentor: Mihai Morar
- Runner-up: Alin Văduva

Release
- Original network: Antena 1
- Original release: September 17, 2011 – January 1, 2012

Season chronology
- Next → Season 2

X Factor is a Romanian television music competition that aims to find a new music talent to become a star. The first season began airing on September 17, 2011, on Antena 1 and ended on January 1, 2012. The winner received a price of €200,000. Based on the UK format, the competition consists of auditions in front of specialized judges that afterwards become mentors. Auditions for the show began in May, 2011 and concluded in June, 2011. The show is hosted by TV presenters Răzvan Simion and Dani Oțil, while the judging panel consists of recording artist and producer Adrian Sînă of the group Akcent, singer-songwriter Paula Seling and Radio DJ Mihai Morar.

== Selection process ==
=== Auditions ===
Auditions for producers began in Cluj-Napoca, România, on May 14, 2011. They then took place in Constanța, on May 21 in Timișoara on May 24, 2011, on June 4 in Iași and concluded on June 11, 2011 in Bucharest.

=== Bootcamp ===
After the bootcamp period, there were twenty-four acts left. 16-24s: Sanziana Nicolae, Andrei Leonte, Cristina Dobrescu, Bogdan Medvedi, Bianca Purcarea, Tania Kramar, Irina Florea, Nae Ovidiu Nicolae

=== Judges houses ===
During Judges houses period, they were sectioned into three different categories. Paula Seling, helped by Alexander Rybak, Adrian Sînă, helped by Alexandra Ungureanu and Mihai Morar, helped by Laurențiu Duță

== Contestants ==
The 12 contestants were confirmed as follows;

Key:

– Winner
– Runner up
– Third Place

Category (mentor)	Acts			
16-24s (Morar)	Antonia Filip	Irina Florea	Andrei Leonte	Ovidiu Nae
Over-25s (Sînă)	Diana Hetea	Cristian Parmac	Alin Văduva	Iulian Vasile
Groups (Seling)	Duo Voice	Refresh	T&L	X-Treme

== Live shows ==
=== Results summary ===
Color key

–	Winner
–	Contestant was in the bottom two/three and had to sing again in the final showdown
–	Contestant was in the bottom three but received the fewest votes and was immediately eliminated

	Week 1	Week 2	Week 3	Week 4	Week 5	Week 6	Week 7	Week 8	Week 9	Week 10	
	Week 1	Week 2	Week 3	Week 4	Week 5	Week 6	Week 7	Week 8	Week 9	Round 1	Round 2
Andrei Leonte	4th 7.35%	3rd 9.21%	6th 8.83%	2nd 17.00%	2nd 18.35%	2nd 19.56%	3rd 16.07%	2nd 24.34%	1st 35.03%	1st	Winner; 51.0%
Alin Văduva	2nd 19.48%	1st 26.77%	3rd 12.21%	1st 19.81%	1st 27.39%	1st 31.30%	1st 31.79%	1st 24.53%	2nd 31.04%	2nd	Runner-up; 32.5%
Iulian Vasile	8th 4.77%	7th 7.15%	5th 10.25%	7th 7.38%	6th 10.15%	5th 9.91%	4th 14.97%	3rd 19.58%	4th 12.79%	3rd 16.5%	Eliminated (Week 10)
T&L	6th 7.20%	10th 2.95%	1st 20.73%	3rd 15.24%	5th 10.39%	6th 7.53%	2nd 18.94%	5th 15.23%	3rd 21.14%	Eliminated (Week 9)	
Diana Hetea	1st 21.19%	2nd 16.24%	2nd 15.13%	5th 10.25%	4th 13.26%	3rd 13.91%	5th 11.75%	4th 16.32%	Eliminated (Week 8)		
Irina Florea	5th 7.21%	8th 5.01%	7th 7.53%	6th 8.82%	7th 9.90%	4th 13.31%	6th 6.48%	Eliminated (Week 7)			
Duo Voice	7th 5.03%	9th 4.17%	4th 10.81%	4th 10.83%	3rd 13.77%	7th 4.48%	Eliminated (Week 6)				
Antonia Filip	10th 3.47%	6th 8.23%	8th 6.22%	8th 6.86%	8th 6.94%	Eliminated (Week 5)					
Refresh	3rd 18.99%	4th 8.99%	10th 3.67%	9th 3.81%	Eliminated (Week 4)						
Ovidiu Nae	12th 1.51%	5th 8.98%	9th 5.94%	Eliminated (Week 3)							
X-Treme	9th 3.63%	11th 2.30%	Eliminated (Week 2)								
Cristian Parmac	11th 2.17%	Eliminated (Week 1)									
Final showdown	Ovidiu Nae; Cristian Parmac	X-Treme; T&L	Ovidiu Nae; Refresh	Antonia Filip; Refresh	Antonia Filip; Irina Florea	Duo Voice; T&L	Irina Florea; Diana Hetea	T&L; Diana Hetea	T&L; Iulian Vasile	No judges' vote or final showdown: public votes alone decide who is eliminated and who ultimately wins	
Morar's vote to eliminate	Cristian Parmac	T&L	Refresh	Refresh	Antonia Filip	Duo Voice	Diana Hetea	Diana Hetea	T&L	No judges' vote or final showdown: public votes alone decide who is eliminated and who ultimately wins	
Seling's vote to eliminate	Cristian Parmac	X-Treme	Ovidiu Nae	Antonia Filip	Irina Florea	has not voted	Irina Florea	Diana Hetea	Iulian Vasile	No judges' vote or final showdown: public votes alone decide who is eliminated and who ultimately wins	
Sînă's vote to eliminate	Ovidiu Nae	X-Treme	Ovidiu Nae	Refresh	Antonia Filip	Duo Voice	Irina Florea	T&L	T&L	No judges' vote or final showdown: public votes alone decide who is eliminated and who ultimately wins	
Eliminated	Cristian Parmac; 2 of 3 Votes; To Eliminate	X-Treme; 2 of 3 Votes; To Eliminate	Ovidiu Nae; 2 of 3 Votes; To Eliminate	Refresh; 2 of 3 Votes; To Eliminate	Antonia Filip; 2 of 3 Votes; To Eliminate	Duo Voice; 2 of 3 Votes; To Eliminate	Irina Florea; 2 of 3 Votes; To Eliminate	Diana Hetea; 2 of 3 Votes; To Eliminate	T&L; 2 of 3 Votes; To Eliminate	Iulian Vasile; 16.5% to win	Alin Văduva; 32.5% to win
Eliminated	Cristian Parmac; 2 of 3 Votes; To Eliminate	X-Treme; 2 of 3 Votes; To Eliminate	Ovidiu Nae; 2 of 3 Votes; To Eliminate	Refresh; 2 of 3 Votes; To Eliminate	Antonia Filip; 2 of 3 Votes; To Eliminate	Duo Voice; 2 of 3 Votes; To Eliminate	Irina Florea; 2 of 3 Votes; To Eliminate	Diana Hetea; 2 of 3 Votes; To Eliminate	T&L; 2 of 3 Votes; To Eliminate	Iulian Vasile; 16.5% to win	Andrei Leonte; 51.0% to win

=== Live show details ===
==== Week 1 (October 29/30) ====
- Theme(s): Number-one singles
- Group Performance: Oficial îmi merge bine
- Musical guest: Oceana — "Cry, Cry"

Contestants' performances on the first live show
Act	Song	Result
Ovidiu Nae	"Down on Me"	Bottom two
Irina Florea	"A Night like This"	Safe
Antonia Filip	"Man Down"	Safe
Andrei Leonte	"Dream Girl"	Safe
Alin Văduva	"Eternity/The Road to Mandalay"	Safe
Iulian Vasile	"How Deep Is Your Love"	Safe
Diana Hetea	"Lângă Mine"	Safe
X-Treme	"Free Your Mind"	Safe
Cristian Parmac	"Don't Stop Me Now"	Bottom two
Refresh	"Atât de singur"	Safe
Duo Voice	"No me ames"	Safe
T&L	"911"	Safe
Final showdown details
Ovidiu Nae	"Grenade"	Safe
Cristian Parmac	"Your Song"	Eliminated

==== Week 2 (November 5/6) ====
- Theme(s): Romanian songs
- Group Performance: Billionaire
- Musical guest: Voltaj — "20" & "Dă vina pe Voltaj"

Contestants' performances on the second live show
Act	Song	Result
Ovidiu Nae	"Dacă dragostea dispare"	Safe
Irina Florea	"Mai frumoasă"	Safe
Antonia Filip	"Tot mai sus"	Safe
Andrei Leonte	"Vara trecută"	Safe
Alin Văduva	"Dincolo de nori"	Safe
Iulian Vasile	"Say Something"	Safe
Diana Hetea	"Mi-ai frânt inima"	Safe
X-Treme	"Banii vorbesc"	Bottom two
Refresh	"Azi vii, mâine pleci"	Safe
Duo Voice	"Dragostea rămâne"	Safe
T&L	"Marionette"	Bottom two
Final showdown details
T&L	"Empire State of Mind"	Safe
X-Treme	"Hush Hush"	Eliminated

==== Week 3 (November 12/13) ====
- Theme(s): Songs from movies
- Group Performance: You're the One That I Want
- Musical guest: Touch & Go — "Would You...?"

Contestants' performances on the third live show
Act	Song	Result
Ovidiu Nae	"Shape of My Heart"	Bottom two
Irina Florea	"I Don't Want to Miss a Thing"	Safe
Antonia Filip	"Get the Party Started"	Safe
Andrei Leonte	"Iris"	Safe
Alin Văduva	"You Can Leave Your Hat On"	Safe
Iulian Vasile	"I Have Nothing"	Safe
Diana Hetea	"Take My Breath Away"	Safe
Refresh	"All for Love"	Bottom two
Duo Voice	"Over the Rainbow"	Safe
T&L	"Bring Me to Life"	Safe
Final showdown details
Refresh	"Sorry Seems to Be the Hardest Word"	Safe
Ovidiu Nae	"Give It to Me Right"	Eliminated

==== Week 4 (November 19/20) ====
- Theme(s): Love songs
- Group Performance: Don't Stop Believin'
- Musical guest: Holograf — "Să nu-mi iei niciodată dragostea"

Contestants' performances on the fourth live show
Act	Song	Result
Irina Florea	"Marcas de ayer"	Safe
Antonia Filip	"Hot n Cold"	Bottom two
Andrei Leonte	"Only Girl (In the World)"	Safe
Alin Văduva	"Fairytale Gone Bad"	Safe
Iulian Vasile	"Sex Bomb"	Safe
Diana Hetea	"I Will Love Again"	Safe
Refresh	"Always"	Bottom two
Duo Voice	"You Raise Me Up"	Safe
T&L	"Ploaie în Luna lui Marte" / "Umbrella"	Safe
Final showdown details
Antonia Filip	"Rehab"	Safe
Refresh	"Right Here Waiting"	Eliminated

==== Week 5 (November 26/27) ====
- Theme(s): Mentors' favorite songs
- Group performance: Beat It
- Musical guest: East 17 — "Thunder"

Contestants' performances on the fifth live show
Act	Song	Result
Irina Florea	"Single Ladies (Put a Ring on It)"	Bottom two
Antonia Filip	"Bad Romance"	Bottom two
Andrei Leonte	"It's My Life"	Safe
Alin Văduva	"Ordinary People"	Safe
Iulian Vasile	"De-ai fi tu salcie la mal"	Safe
Diana Hetea	"Without You"	Safe
Duo Voice	"I Will Always Love You"	Safe
T&L	"Who Wants to Live Forever"	Safe
Final showdown details
Irina Florea	"I Love Rock & Roll"	Safe
Antonia Filip	"I Follow Rivers"	Eliminated

==== Week 6 (December 3/4) ====
- Theme: Live Band
- Group Performance: (I Can't Get No) Satisfaction
- Musical guest: Direcția 5 — "Îți mulțumesc" & "Ai un loc"

Contestants' performances on the sixth live show
Act	Song	Result
Irina Florea	"Sweet Child o' Mine"	Safe
Andrei Leonte	"Moves Like Jagger"	Safe
Alin Văduva	"Sex on Fire"	Safe
Iulian Vasile	"Always on the Run"	Safe
Diana Hetea	"Mercy"	Safe
Duo Voice	"Heal the World"	Bottom two
T&L	"One"/"Where Is the Love?"	Bottom two
Final showdown details
T&L	"Back to Black"	Safe
Duo Voice	"Hallelujah"	Eliminated

==== Week 7 (December 10/11) ====
- Theme: Audience' choice and Mentors' choice
- Group performance: I Gotta Feeling
- Musical guest: Alexander Rybak — "Europe Skies" and "Fairytale"

Contestants' performances on the seventh live show
Act	Order	First song	Order	Second song	Result
Andrei Leonte	1	"Supergirl"	7	"I'm Yours"	Safe
Diana Hetea	2	"Alejandro"	8	"We Found Love"	Bottom two
Irina Florea	3	"Privirea ta"	9	"Underneath Your Clothes"	Bottom two
T&L	4	"Love the Way You Lie (Parts I & II)"	12	"When Love Takes Over / Give Me Everything"	Safe
Alin Văduva	5	"Angels"	10	"Crazy"	Safe
Iulian Vasile	6	"Simply the Best"	11	"When a Man Loves a Woman"	Safe
Final showdown details
Irina Florea	1	"If I Ain't Got You"			Eliminated
Diana Hetea	2	Video Footage*			Safe

- As a worldwide X Factor premiere, Diana Hetea wasn't able to perform a "Save Me Song" because she suffered of Laryngitis that night. So as a convention, the producers decided to put on a footage with all of her performances during the X Factor galas.

==== Week 8: (December 17/18) ====
- Theme(s): Musical Heroes / Mentor's Choice
- Group Performance: Another Brick in the Wall
- Musical guest: In-Grid - "Tu es foutu" & "Vive Le Swing"

Contestants' performances on the eighth live show
Act	Order	First song	Order	Second song	Result
Andrei Leonte	1	"18 ani"	10	"Home"	Safe
Iulian Vasile	2	"Aïcha"	9	"Crazy"	Safe
Diana Hetea	3	"Un actor grăbit"	6	"Sweet Dreams (Are Made of This)"	Bottom two
Alin Văduva	4	"Red"	7	"Cerul"	Safe
T&L	5	"Vino înapoi"	8	"Numb"	Bottom two
Final showdown details
Diana Hetea	1	"Russian Roulette"			Eliminated
T&L	2	"Nobody's Perfect"			Safe

==== Week 9: (December 24/25) ====
- Theme(s): Christmas Songs, Mentors' choice
- Group Performance:
- 24 December : Contestants from auditions — "Deschide ușa, creștine"
- 25 December : X Factor Finalists — "La casa di peste drum"
- Musical guest: Paula Seling — "Colindăm (Iarna)", "Timpul" & "Noapte caldă"

Contestants' performances on the ninth live show
Act	Order	First song	Order	Second song	Result
Iulian Vasile	1	"Feliz Navidad"	6	"It's a Man's Man's Man's World"	Bottom two
Alin Văduva	2	"Human"	5	"Let It Snow! Let It Snow! Let It Snow!"	Safe
Andrei Leonte	3	"Last Christmas"	8	"Use Somebody"	Safe
T&L	4	"I'll Be Missing You"	7	"Iarna (Milioane)"	Bottom two
Final showdown details
T&L	1	"Firework"/"Fly"			Eliminated
Iulian Vasile	2	"Kiss"			Safe

==== Week 10: (January 1) ====
- Theme(s): Audition Songs, Celebrity Duets, Winner's Single
- Group Performance: We Will Rock You
- Musical guests: Vama ("Copilul care aleargă către mare"), Mandinga ("Danza Kuduro", "Zaleilah"), ROA ("Ne place", "Sonată în la minor"), Vunk ("Artificii pe tavan"), Laurențiu Duță feat. X Factor Finalists ("Amintirile")

Contestants' performances on the final live show
Act	Order	First song	Order	Second song (Duet)	Order	Third song	Result
Alin Văduva	1	"Feeling Good"	6	"Pleacă" (with Vunk)	7	"Ain't No Sunshine"	Runner-Up
Iulian Vasile	2	"I Got You (I Feel Good)"	5	"Soarele meu" (with Mandinga)	9	"Hit the Road Jack"	Third Place
Andrei Leonte	3	"The Man Who Can't Be Moved"	4	"Vama Veche" (with Vama)	8	"Someone Like You"	Winner

== Ratings ==
#	Date	Viewers (thousands)	Rating
Audition 1	17 September 2011	652.000	5,6
Audition 2	18 September 2011	559.000	4,8
Audition 3	24 September 2011	801.000	6,9
Audition 4	1 October 2011	849.000	7,3
Audition 5	8 October 2011	888.000	7,6
Bootcamp	15 October 2011	652.000	5,6
