= X Factor (Romanian TV series) season 3 =

X Factor
- Season 3
- Hosted by: Răzvan Simion; Dani Oțil (A1)
- Judges: Dan Bittman; Delia Matache; Cheloo
- Winner: Florin Ristei
- Winning mentor: Delia Matache
- Runner-up: Alex Mațaev

Release
- Original network: Antena 1
- Original release: September 22 – December 22, 2013

Season chronology
- ← Previous; Season 2 Next → Season 4

X Factor is a Romanian television music competition that aims to find a new music talent to become a star. The third season began airing on 23 September 2013 on Antena 1. The winner received a prize of €120,000 (decreased from €200,000 in the last season).

This season has the slogan "Muzică și suflet" ("Music and soul").

The hosts are the same as in the first two seasons: Răzvan Simion and Dani Oțil, who are also known for hosting a well-known morning show on Antena 1. Dan Bittman, Delia Matache and Cheloo have returned as judges for the third season.

The registration started for the third season in June 2013. Antena 1 made changes on the list for the audition cities: Craiova was dropped, Arad and Bucharest were added.

On December 22, 2013, the season was won by Florin Ristei, mentored by Matache. Alex Mațaev, mentored also by Matache finished in second place.

== Judges ==
Series 3 judges

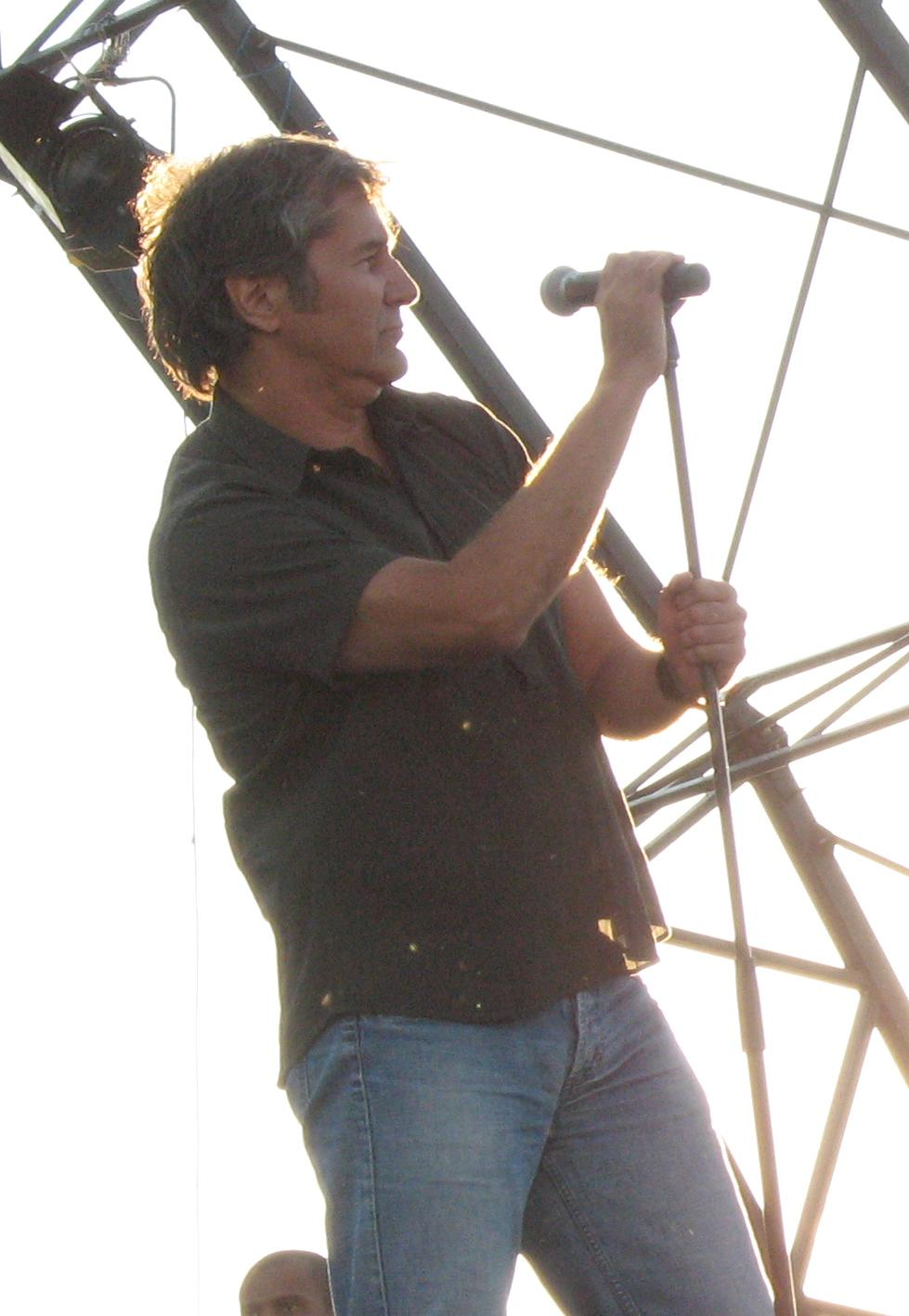
Dan Bittman

- Delia Matache – singer
- Dan Bittman – singer, television host
- Cheloo – rapper

== Selection process ==
=== Auditions ===
Cities that auditions and/or pre-auditions were held in.

The audition process was based on that of the British and American versions. First was "The Producer's Audition", where the producers chose singers to proceed to the second phase, which was "The Audition before the Judging panel". The first auditions took place at Craiova, on 2 June. They then took place in Arad, on June 5 in Cluj Napoca on June 8, 2013, on June 11 in Iași, on June 14 in Constanța and concluded on June 17, 2013 in Bucharest.

Summary of auditions
City	Auditions date	Venue
Craiova	June 2, 2013	Craiova University
Arad	June 5, 2013	Hotel Parc
Cluj Napoca	June 8, 2013	Iulius Mall
Iași	June 11, 2013	Palas Mall
Constanța	June 14, 2013	Bavaria Blu - Mamaia
Bucharest	June 17, 2013	Children's Palace

=== Bootcamp ===
In a change to the usual format, the judges were allocated their categories before bootcamp. Cheloo will mentor the Groups, Matache took the Over 20s and Bittman had the Under 20s. The group Bruiaj (Eliza Bunu and Rareş Raicu) was formed in bootcamp. After the bootcamp period, there were 32 acts left.

The 32 acts who reached the Judges' Houses:

- Under 20s: Ana-Maria Mihăieș, Andrei Ciobanu, Alexandru Simion, Bogdan Bratiș, Florena Țicu Șandro, Rodica Tudor, Mihai Tăbăcaru, Claudiu Nergheș, Andrei Raețchi, Alexandru Ionașc, Andreea Lazăr, Ruxandra Tomulesei and Mădălina Lefter
- Groups: Bruiaj, Cat Girls, Chillout, Căminu' 16, Double X, Fără Titlu, November and Quattro
- Over 20s: Alex Mațaev, Diana Vartolomei, Dumitru Botnaru, Florin Ristei, Maria Roșculete, Larisa Vâna, Eliza Nirlu, Mihai Tăbăcaru, Miruna Diaconescu, Isabella Covrig, Paolo Lagana and Oana Muntean

=== Judges house ===
The judges' home visit was the last stage of the selection process. The episode were aired on 17 November 2013. Each judge took the remaining members of their category to an overseas location, and had guests to assist them in their decisions. Cheloo was assisted by Mihaela Rădulescu, Delia was advised by Mihai Bendeac and Bittman was by Simona Gherghe. In this stage Bella from November was eliminated by her mentor and the group November remained with only two members.

The seventeen eliminated acts were:

- Under 20s: Andrei Ciobanu, Alexandru Simion, Rodica Tudor, Mihai Tăbăcaru, Andrei Raețchi, Alexandru Ionașc, Andreea Lazăr
- Groups: Chillout, Fără Titlu, Cat Girls
- Over 20s: Diana Vartolomei, Maria Roșculete, Larisa Vâna, Eliza Nirlu, Claudiu Nergheș, Miruna Diaconescu, Isabella Covrig

=== Finalists ===
The 15 finalists were confirmed as follows:

Key:

– Winner
– Runner-up
– Third place

Category (mentor)	Acts				
Under 20s (Bittman)	Bogdan Bratiș	Mădălina Lefter	Ana-Maria Mihăieș	Florena Țicu Șandro	Ruxandra Tomulesei
Over 20s (Matache)	Dumitru Botnaru	Paolo Lagana	Alex Mațaev	Oana Muntean	Florin Ristei
Groups (Cheloo)	Bruiaj	Căminu' 16	Double X	November	Quattro

=== Results summary ===
Color key

–	Winner
–	Contestant was in the bottom two and had to sing again in the final showdown
–	Contestant received the fewest public votes and was immediately eliminated (no final showdown)

Weekly results per contestant
Contestant	Week 1	Week 2	Week 3	Week 4		Week 5	
Contestant	Week 1	Week 2	Week 3	Round 1	Round 2	Round 1	Round 2
Florin Ristei	Safe	Safe	Bottom two	Safe	Safe	Safe	Winner
Alex Mațaev	Safe	Safe	Safe	Safe	Safe	Safe	Runner-up
Mădălina Lefter	Safe	Bottom two	Safe	Safe	Safe	3rd	Eliminated (week 5)
Bogdan Bratiș	Safe	Safe	Bottom two	Safe	Safe	4th	Eliminated (week 5)
Double X	Safe	Safe	Bottom two	Safe	5th	Eliminated (week 4)	
November	Safe	Bottom two	Safe	6th	Eliminated (week 4)		
Florena Țicu Șandro	Safe	Safe	Bottom two	Eliminated (Week 3)			
Oana Muntean	Bottom two	Bottom two	Bottom two	Eliminated (Week 3)			
Bruiaj	Safe	Safe	Bottom two	Eliminated (Week 3)			
Căminu' 16	Bottom two	Bottom two	Eliminated (Week 2)				
Paolo Lagana	Safe	Bottom two	Eliminated (Week 2)				
Ana-Maria Mihăieș	Bottom two	Bottom two	Eliminated (Week 2)				
Quattro	Bottom two	Eliminated (Week 1)					
Ruxandra Tomulesei	Bottom two	Eliminated (Week 1)					
Dumitru Botnaru	Bottom two	Eliminated (Week 1)					
Final showdown	Dumitru Botnaru, Oana Muntean	Ana-Maria Mihăieș, Mădălina Lefter	Bruiaj, Double X	No judges' vote or final showdown: public votes alone decide who is eliminated			
Final showdown	Ana-Maria Mihăieș, Ruxandra Tomulesei	Oana Muntean, Paolo Lagana	Oana Muntean, Florin Ristei	No judges' vote or final showdown: public votes alone decide who is eliminated			
Final showdown	Căminu' 16, Quattro	Căminu' 16, November	Florena Țicu Șandro, Bogdan Bratiș	No judges' vote or final showdown: public votes alone decide who is eliminated			
Bittman's vote to eliminate	Ruxandra Tomulesei	Ana-Maria Mihăieș	Florena Țicu Șandro	No judges' vote or final showdown: public votes alone decide who is eliminated			
Matache's vote to eliminate	Dumitru Botnaru	Paolo Lagana	Oana Muntean	No judges' vote or final showdown: public votes alone decide who is eliminated			
Cheloo's vote to eliminate	Quattro	Căminu' 16	Bruiaj	No judges' vote or final showdown: public votes alone decide who is eliminated			
Eliminated	Ruxandra Tomulesei by Bittman	Ana-Maria Mihăieș by Bittman	Florena Țicu Șandro by Bittman	November; Public vote	Double X Public vote	Bogdan Bratiș; Public vote	Alex Mațaev; Public vote to win
Eliminated	Dumitru Botnaru by Matache	Paolo Lagana by Matache	Oana Muntean by Matache	November; Public vote	Double X Public vote	Bogdan Bratiș; Public vote	Alex Mațaev; Public vote to win
Eliminated	Dumitru Botnaru by Matache	Paolo Lagana by Matache	Oana Muntean by Matache	November; Public vote	Double X Public vote	Mădălina Lefter; Public vote	Florin Ristei; Public vote to win
Eliminated	Quattro by Cheloo	Căminu' 16 by Cheloo	Bruiaj by Cheloo	November; Public vote	Double X Public vote	Mădălina Lefter; Public vote	Florin Ristei; Public vote to win
Reference(s)							

== Live Shows ==
The live shows underwent a change in this season. In the first three live shows, each category will have its own final showdown, the result of which is decided solely by its mentor. The outcome of the fourth show will only rely on the public vote and will have two eliminations (one of which will happen halfway through of the show, when the voting will have been frozen). Thus, the final will have four contestants (not three as in previous seasons). Two of the finalists will be eliminated halfway through the final show, when the voting will have been frozen. The winner is still determined by the public vote.

=== Week 1 (24 November) ===
- Theme: Hits from last 20 years
- Group performance(s): Medley from "U Can't Touch This", "Gonna Make You Sweat, "MMMBop", "Wannabe", "Hung Up", "Blurred Lines", "I Gotta Feeling"
- Musical Guest: Paraziții ("Din colțul blocului", "Toate-s la fel", "Arde")

Contestants' performances on the first live show
Act	Order	Song	Result
Dumitru Botnaru	1	"Livin' la Vida Loca"	Bottom two
Oana Muntean	2	"Unfaithful"	Bottom two
Florin Ristei	3	"Locked Out of Heaven"	Safe
Alex Mațaev	4	"Impossible"	Safe
Paolo Lagana	5	"Paparazzi"	Safe
Ana-Maria Mihăieș	6	"Memories"	Bottom two
Ruxandra Tomulesei	7	"Hurt"	Bottom two
Bogdan Bratiș	8	"This Love"	Safe
Mădălina Lefter	9	"Listen"	Safe
Florena Țicu Șandro	10	"Girl on Fire"	Safe
Quattro	11	"Candyman"	Bottom two
Căminu' 16	12	"Two Princes"	Bottom two
Double X	13	"Doo Wop (That Thing)"	Safe
November	14	"'03 Bonnie & Clyde"	Safe
Bruiaj	15	"Jump Around"	Safe
Final showdown details
Dumitru Botnaru	1	"Wild Dances"	Eliminated
Oana Muntean	2	"If You Could See Me Now"	Safe
Ana-Maria Mihăieș	1	"Rolling in the Deep"	Safe
Ruxandra Tomulesei	2	"Euphoria"	Eliminated
Căminu' 16	1	"Angels"	Safe
Quattro	2	"Don't Let Go (Love)"	Eliminated

Judges' votes to eliminate

- Matache: Dumitru Botnaru - gave no reason
- Bittman: Ruxandra Tomulesei - based on the performances
- Cheloo: Quattro - gave no reason

=== Week 2 (29 November) ===
- Theme: Romanian music
- Group performance(s): Medley - Romanian music: "Inima mea", "O secundă", "Amintirile", "Poezie de stradă", "Rămâi cu mine", "Dragostea din tei", "P.O.H.U.I", "Ți-am dat un inel".
- Musical Guest: Holograf ("Roua dimineții", "Cât de departe", "Dacă noi ne iubim")

Contestants' performances on the second live show
Act	Order	Song	Result
Ana-Maria Mihăieș	1	"Zig-Zagga"	Bottom two
Florena Țicu Șandro	2	"Timpul"	Safe
Mădălina Lefter	3	"Inevitabil va fi bine"	Bottom two
Bogdan Bratiș	4	"Prăjitura cu jeleu"	Safe
Oana Muntean	5	"Un actor grăbit"	Bottom two
Paolo Lagana	6	"Te-aștept să vii"	Bottom two
Florin Ristei	7	"De-ai fi tu salcie"	Safe
Alex Mațaev	8	"Vama Veche"	Safe
Bruiaj	9	"Vino la mine"	Safe
Căminu' 16	10	"Perfect fără tine"	Bottom two
November	11	"Change"	Bottom two
Double X	12	"Iarna pe val"	Safe
Final showdown details
Ana-Maria Mihăieș	1	"Grenade"	Eliminated
Mădălina Lefter	2	"Bound to You"	Safe
Oana Muntean	1	"Raggamuffin"	Safe
Paolo Lagana	2	"Proud Mary"	Eliminated
Căminu' 16	1	"Sex Bomb"	Eliminated
November	2	"Thrift Shop"	Safe

Judges' votes to eliminate

- Matache: Paolo Lagana - praised his attitude, but went with Oana for her voice
- Bittman: Ana-Maria Mihăieș - gave no reason
- Cheloo: Căminu' 16 - said he trusted in the other group's abilities

=== Week 3 (8 December) ===
- Theme: Best voices (Hits)
- Group performance(s): Medley from "Wake Me Up", "Call Me Maybe", "Feel This Moment"
- Musical Guest: Delia Matache ("Doar pentru tine", "Doi în unu", "Vino la mine"), Cocoon Kills and Andreea Lazăr ("Pisi cea obraznică"), Petra Pintelei ("Sleeping Sun"), Tudor Turcu ("Nu minţi")

Contestants' performances on the third live show
Act	Order	Song	Result
Bruiaj	1	"I'll Be Missing You"	Bottom two
Double X	2	"In the End"	Bottom two
November	3	"Love the Way You Lie"	Safe
Florin Ristei	4	"Don't Stop Me Now"	Bottom two
Oana Muntean	5	"Empire State of Mind"	Bottom two
Alex Mațaev	6	"It's My Life"	Safe
Florena Țicu Șandro	7	"We Found Love"	Bottom two
Bogdan Bratiș	8	"Mirrors"	Bottom two
Mădălina Lefter	9	"Someone Like You"	Safe
Final showdown details
Bruiaj	1	"I Need a Doctor"	Eliminated
Double X	2	"Paradise City"	Safe
Oana Muntean	1	"You Know I'm No Good"	Eliminated
Florin Ristei	2	"I'll Make Love to You" / "End of the Road"	Safe
Florena Țicu Șandro	1	"Don't You Remember"	Eliminated
Bogdan Bratiș	2	"Home"	Safe

Judges' votes to eliminate

- Matache: Oana Muntean - based on performance
- Bittman: Florena Țicu Șandro - based on performance
- Cheloo: Bruiaj - gave no reason

=== Week 4: Semi-final (15 December) ===
- Theme: Celebrity Duets
- Group performance(s): Medley from "Wild Ones", "When Love Takes Over", "Moves like Jagger"
- Musical Guest: Dragoş Udilă feat. What's Up ("Scumpă domnişoară"), CRBL ("KBoom"), Lora ("De iarnă")

Contestants' performances on the fourth live show
Act	Order	Song	Result
First Round
Double X	1	"România nu-i jucăria ta" (with CRBL)	Safe
Mădălina Lefter	2	"Je t'aime" (with Luminița Anghel)	Safe
Alex Mațaev	3	"Just Give Me a Reason" (with Paula Seling)	Safe
November	4	"Breathe" (with Dragoş Udilă)	Eliminated
Bogdan Bratiș	5	"20 de ani" (with Călin Goia)	Safe
Florin Ristei	6	"Somebody That I Used to Know" (with Lora)	Safe
Second Round
Double X	1	"Sing for the Moment"	Eliminated
Mădălina Lefter	2	"I Have Nothing"	Safe
Alex Mațaev	3	"Sex on Fire"	Safe
Bogdan Bratiș	4	"Stop and Stare"	Safe
Florin Ristei	5	"Fairytale"	Safe

=== Week 5: Final (22 December) ===
Round 1

- Theme: Duets & Romanian Songs
- Group performance(s): X Factor Finalists ("Merry Christmas Everyone"), "Silent Night"
- Musical Guest: Zdob și Zdub ("Bunica Bate Toba"), The Colors ("Two of Us")

Contestants' performances on the fifth live show
Act	Order	First song (duet)	Order	Second song	Result
Bogdan Bratiș	1	"Vreau o minune" (with Dan Bittman)	5	"Zece"	Eliminated
Mădălina Lefter	6	"Ochii tăi" (with Dan Bittman)	2	"De-ar fi să vii"	Eliminated
Florin Ristei	3	"Stay" (with Delia)	7	"Cerul"	Safe
Alex Mațaev	8	"Read All About It" (with Delia)	4	"Acasă"	Safe

Round 2

- Theme: Final Duel
- Musical Guest: Zdob și Zdub ("DJ Vasile")

Contestants' performances on the final live show
Act	Order	Song	Result
Alex Mațaev	1	"I Don't Want to Miss a Thing"	Runner-up
Florin Ristei	2	"Bed of Roses"	Winner

== Artists' appearances on earlier talent shows ==
- Oana Muntean and Alexandru Simion made it to Vocea României's The Battle rounds in season two.
- Eliza Bunu participated in season two of X Factor, but she was eliminated at Judges home.
- Alex Mațaev former Fabrica de Staruri winner is one of the contestants to compete this season.

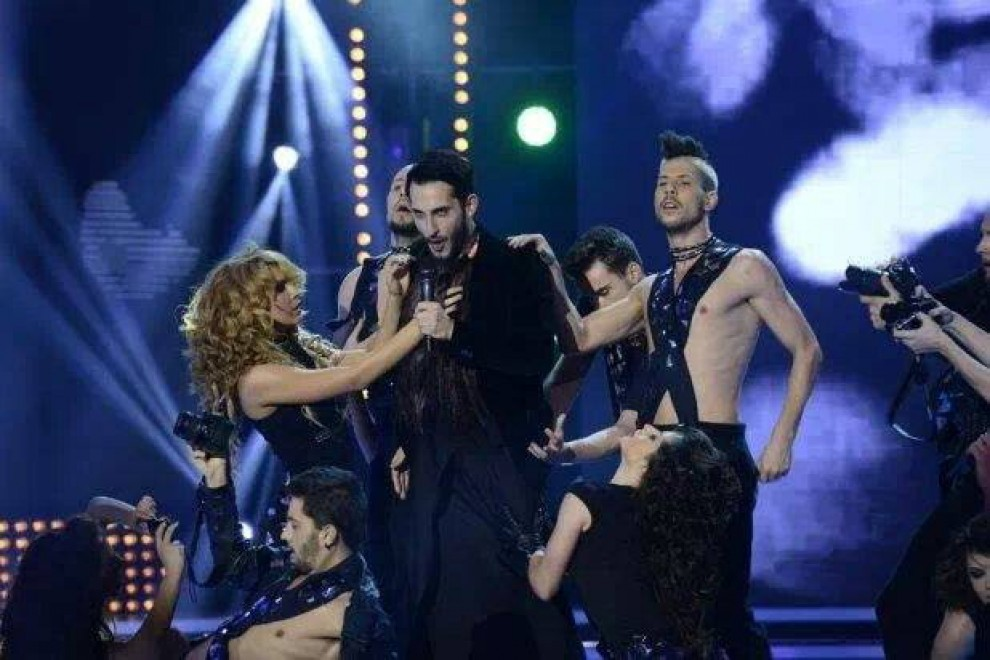

== Controversy ==
One of the contestants, Paolo Laganà (an Italian living in Romania at the time of the contest), made known his homosexuality on his entrance forms, which eventually drew ire and epithets from judge Cheloo. The offending remarks were edited from the broadcast, but may have affected the outcome of the contest in which Laganà was eliminated early. The event drew outcries from the Italian LGBT community, with calls for action from the Italian Ministry of the Exterior.

After the show, Laganà left Romania and moved to Berlin.

== Ratings ==
Ep	Title	Date	National		Urban		Source
Ep	Title	Date	Average (thousands)	Rating (%)	Average (thousands)	Rating (%)	Source
1	Auditions 1	23 September 2013	1 593	8.4	1 093	9.0	
2	Auditions 2	29 September 2013	1 634	8.6	998	9.5	
3	Auditions 3	6 October 2013	1 614	8.5	1 079	10.3	
4	Auditions 4	13 October 2013	1 872	9.8	1 247	11.9	
5	Auditions 5	20 October 2013	1 518	8.0	1 018	9.7	
6	Auditions 6	27 October 2013	1 405	7.7	998	9.5	
7	Auditions 7	3 November 2013	1 560	8.2	1 129	10.8	
8	Auditions 8/Bootcamp	10 November 2013	1 254	6.6	891	8.5	
9	Judges house	17 November 2013	1 189	6.2	830	7.9	
10	Live Show 1	24 November 2013	890	4.7	635	6.1	
11	Live Show 2	29 November 2013	1 037	5,4	712	6,8	
12	Live Show 3	8 December 2013	748	3,9	539	5,1	
13	Semifinal	15 December 2013	986	5,2	669	6,4	
14	Final	22 December 2013					
