= X Factor (Romanian TV series) season 2 =

X Factor
- Season 2
- Hosted by: Răzvan Simion; Dani Oțil (A1)
- Judges: Dan Bittman; Delia Matache; Cheloo
- Winner: Tudor Turcu
- Winning mentor: Cheloo
- Runner-up: Ioana Anuța

Release
- Original network: Antena 1
- Original release: 23 September – 23 December 2012

Season chronology
- ← Previous; Season 1 Next → Season 3

X Factor is a Romanian television music competition that aims to find a new music talent to become a star. The second season aired in fall 2012 on Antena 1. The winner received a prize of €200,000.

The hosts are the same as in the first season: Răzvan Simion and Dani Oțil, who are also known for hosting a well known morning show on Antena 1. The X Factor producers decided to change the entire group of judges. The first mentor announced for the season was Dan Bittman On 16 June, Antena 1 announced the other two members of the jury: singer Delia Matache, and Cheloo, member of the hip-hop band Paraziții.

The registration started for the second season in May 2012. Antena 1 made changes on the list for the audition cities: Constanța was dropped, Sibiu and Craiova were added.

== Judges ==
Series 2 judges

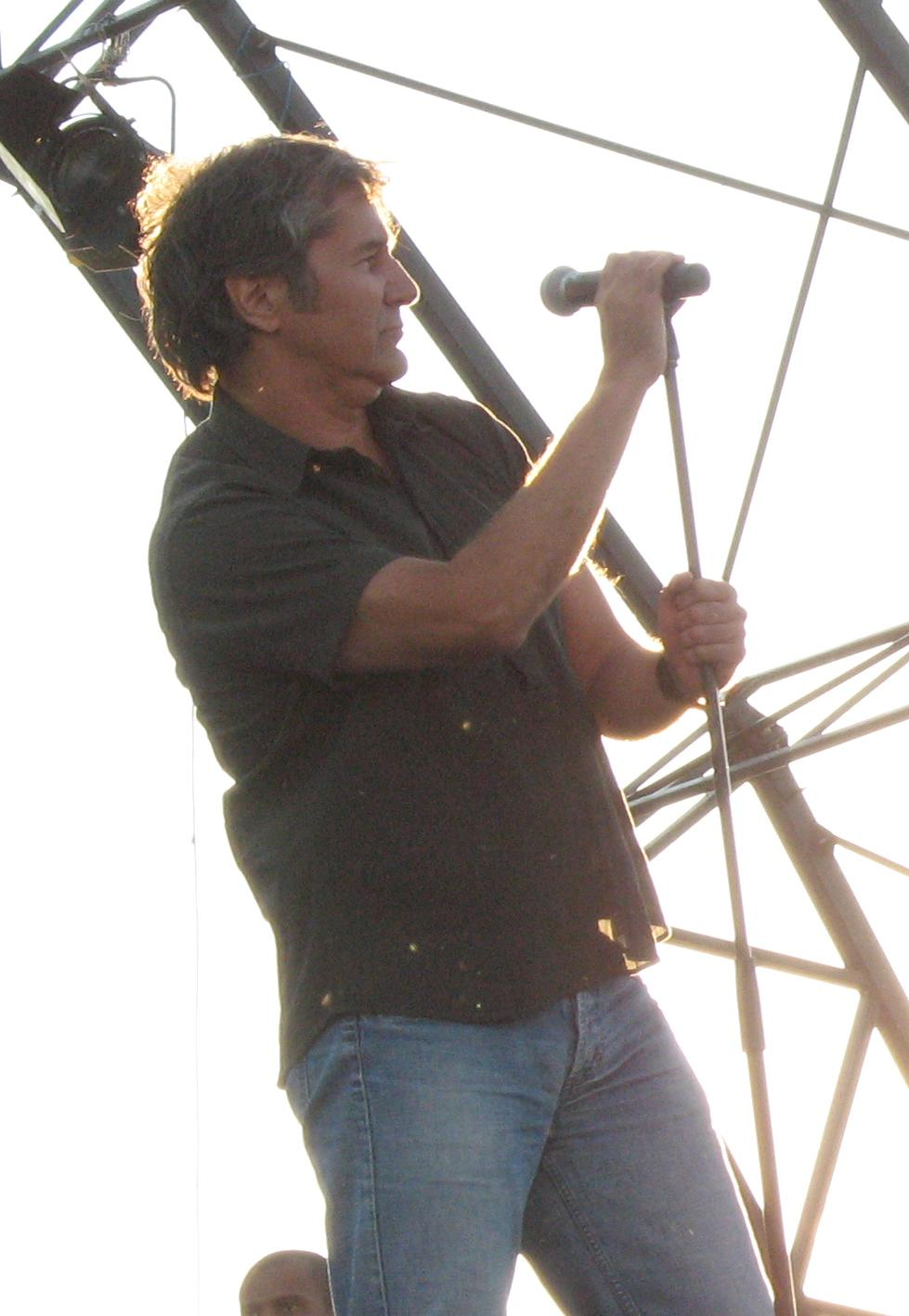
Dan Bittman

- Delia Matache – singer, celebrity
- Dan Bittman – singer
- Cheloo – rapper

== Selection precess ==
=== Auditions ===
The first auditions took place at Craiova, on 15 June, and hundreds of people entered the contest for the chance to win the big prize. They then took place in Sibiu, on 18 June in Timișoara on 21 June 2012, on 27 June in Iași and concluded on 1 July 2012 in Bucharest.

Summary of auditions
Audition city	Date
Craiova	15 June 2012
Sibiu	18 June 2012
Timișoara	21 June 2012
Cluj-Napoca	24 June 2012
Iași	27 June 2012
Bucharest	1 July 2012

=== Bootcamp ===
Filming for bootcamp was held in Bucharest. 196 people who received 3 yes entered bootcamp. The groups Sens Unic, Nord X, Station 4, Red, 2B, HOT and 4 Mix were formed from eliminated contestants from the 16–24, Overs 25 and Groups categories in bootcamp. After the bootcamp period, there were 26 acts left.

The 26 acts who reached the Judges' Houses:

- 16–24s: Ráduly Botond, Vasi Bistrae, Tudor Toduț, Nadir Tamuz, Ioana Anuța, Iulia Manolache, Sânziana Nicolae, Alexandra Broinaș and Diana Cazan
- Groups: Sens Unic, R Family, Nord X, Station 4, 2B, Red, Soul Music Art, HOT and 4 Mix
- Over 25s: Ioan Mann, Lidia Glavu, Csaba Engi, Corina Chirilă, Natalia Selegean, Tudor Turcu, Dragoș Udilă and Iulia Glăvan

=== Judges houses ===
The judges received news of their categories. Cheloo mentored the Over 25's in Valea Doftanei, assisted by Bitză, Matache took the Groups to Delta Dunării with Mitză and Bittman had the 16-24s in Bucharest with Edi Petroșel.

The eleven eliminated acts were:

- 16–24s: Vasi Bistrae, Sânziana Nicolae, Alexandra Broinaș, Diana Cazan
- Groups: Soul Music Art, HOT, 4 Mix, Sens Unic
- Over 25s: Lidia Glavu, Csaba Engi, Corina Chirilă

== Finalists ==
The 15 finalists were confirmed as follows;

Key:

– Winner
– Runner-up
– Third place

Category (mentor)	Acts				
16-24s (Bittman)	Ioana Anuța	Ráduly Botond	Iulia Manolache	Nadir Tamuz	Tudor Toduț
Over-25s (Cheloo)	Iulia Glăvan	Ioan Mann	Natalia Selegean	Tudor Turcu	Dragoș Udilă
Groups (Matache)	2B	Nord X	R Family	Red	Station 4

=== Results summary ===
Color key

–	Contestant was in the bottom three and had to sing again in the final showdown
–	Contestant was in the bottom three but received the fewest votes and was immediately eliminated
–	Contestant received the fewest public votes and was immediately eliminated (no final showdown)
–	Contestant received the most public votes

Weekly results per contestant
Contestant	Week 1	Week 2	Week 3	Week 4	Week 5	Week 6	Week 7	
Contestant	Week 1	Week 2	Week 3	Week 4	Week 5	Week 6	Round 1	Round 2
Tudor Turcu	Safe	Safe	Safe	Safe	Safe	Safe	Safe	Winner
Ioana Anuța	Safe	Safe	Safe	Safe	Safe	Safe	Safe	Runner-up
Natalia Selegean	Safe	Safe	Safe	Safe	Bottom 3	Bottom 3	3rd	Eliminated (Week 7)
Red	Safe	Safe	Bottom 3	Safe	Safe	Bottom 3	Eliminated (Week 6)	
Dragoș Udilă	Safe	Safe	Safe	Bottom 3	Safe	5th	Eliminated (Week 6)	
Ioan Mann	Safe	Safe	Safe	Safe	Bottom 3	Eliminated (Week 5)		
Iulia Manolache	Safe	Safe	Safe	Safe	7th	Eliminated (Week 5)		
Nord X	Safe	Safe	Safe	Bottom 3	Eliminated (Week 4)			
Tudor Toduț	Safe	Bottom 3	Safe	9th	Eliminated (Week 4)			
Nadir Tamuz	Safe	Safe	Bottom 3	Eliminated (Week 3)				
Ráduly Botond	Safe	Safe	11th	Eliminated (Week 3)				
Station 4	Bottom 3	Bottom 3	Eliminated (Week 2)					
2B	Safe	13th	Eliminated (Week 2)					
Iulia Glăvan	Bottom 3	Eliminated (Week 1)						
R Family	15th	Eliminated (Week 1)						
Final showdown	Iulia Glăvan, Station 4	Station 4, Tudor Toduț	Nadir Tamuz, Red	Dragoș Udilă, Nord X	Natalia Selegean, Ioan Mann	Natalia Selegean, Red	No judges' vote or final showdown: public votes alone decide who is eliminated and who ultimately wins	
Bittman's vote to eliminate	Iulia Glăvan	Station 4	Red	Nord X	Natalia Selegean	Red	No judges' vote or final showdown: public votes alone decide who is eliminated and who ultimately wins	
Matache's vote to eliminate	Iulia Glăvan	Tudor Toduț	Nadir Tamuz	Dragoș Udilă	Ioan Mann	Natalia Selegean	No judges' vote or final showdown: public votes alone decide who is eliminated and who ultimately wins	
Cheloo's vote to eliminate	Station 4	Station 4	Nadir Tamuz	Nord X	Ioan Mann	Red	No judges' vote or final showdown: public votes alone decide who is eliminated and who ultimately wins	
Eliminated	R Family; Public vote	2B; Public vote	Ráduly Botond; Public vote	Tudor Toduț; Public vote	Iulia Manolache; Public vote	Dragoș Udilă; Public vote	Natalia Selegean; Public vote to win	Ioana Anuța; Public vote to win
Eliminated	Iulia Glăvan; 2 of 3 Votes; Majority	Station 4; 2 of 3 Votes; Majority	Nadir Tamuz; 2 of 3 Votes; Majority	Nord X 2 of 3 Votes; Majority	Ioan Mann; 2 of 3 Votes; Majority	Red; 2 of 3 Votes; Majority	Natalia Selegean; Public vote to win	Ioana Anuța; Public vote to win

=== Live shows ===
Owing to the addition of four wildcard contestants, two acts were eliminated from the series' first results show. The three acts with the fewest votes were announced as the bottom three and the act with the fewest public votes was then automatically eliminated. The remaining two acts then performed in the final showdown for the judges' votes.

=== Week 1 (11 November) ===
- Theme: Live Band
- Group performance(s): "Party Rock Anthem", "We Found Love", "Give Me Everything", "The Edge of Glory"
- Musical Guest: Alesha Dixon ("The Boy Does Nothing", "Scandalous")

Contestants' performances on the first live show
Act	Order	Song	Result
Red	1	"Single Ladies (Put a Ring on It)"	Safe
Tudor Toduț	2	"Viva la Vida"	Safe
Iulia Glăvan	3	"Give It to Me Right"	Bottom three
Station 4	4	"Use Somebody"	Bottom three
Ioana Anuța	5	"Do It Like a Dude"	Safe
Dragoș Udilă	6	"Haven't Met You Yet"	Safe
R Family	7	"Tubthumping"	Eliminated
Ráduly Botond	8	"Whataya Want from Me"	Safe
Ioan Mann	9	"Only Girl (In the World)"	Safe
2B	10	"Playing with Fire"	Safe
Nadir Tamuz	11	"Breakeven"	Safe
Tudor Turcu	12	"How You Remind Me"	Safe
Nord X	13	"Somebody That I Used to Know"	Safe
Iulia Manolache	14	"Set Fire to the Rain"	Safe
Natalia Selegean	15	"Born This Way"	Safe
Final showdown details
Station 4	1	"What Makes You Beautiful"	Safe
Iulia Glăvan	2	"I'm Outta Love"	Eliminated

Judges' votes to eliminate

- Cheloo: Station 4 – backed his own act, Iulia Glăvan
- Matache: Iulia Glăvan – backed her own act, Station 4
- Bittman: Iulia Glăvan – thought they have many flaws and Iulia has a great voice, Station 4 should be given a chance because they are young and inexperienced

=== Week 2 (18 November) ===
- Theme: Love and Hate
- Group performance(s): "Sweet Child o' Mine", "Crazy Crazy Nights", "Highway to Hell", "We Will Rock You", "I Love Rock 'n' Roll"
- Musical Guest: Loreen ("Euphoria", "My Heart Is Refusing Me")

Contestants' performances on the second live show
Act	Order	Song	Result
Natalia Selegean	1	"Stronger (What Doesn't Kill You)"	Safe
Nadir Tamuz	2	"Valerie"	Safe
Red	3	"Free Your Mind"	Safe
Tudor Turcu	4	"Here Without You"	Safe
Iulia Manolache	5	"Euphoria"	Safe
2B	6	"Nobody Wants to Be Lonely"	Eliminated
Dragoș Udilă	7	"Roxanne"	Safe
Ioana Anuța	8	"Crazy"	Safe
Station 4	9	"I'll Be There for You"	Bottom three
Tudor Toduț	10	"You Give Love a Bad Name"	Bottom three
Ioan Mann	11	"She's the One"	Safe
Ráduly Botond	12	"Pink"	Safe
Nord X	13	"Smells Like Teen Spirit"	Safe
Final showdown details
Station 4	1	"Call Me Maybe"	Eliminated
Tudor Toduț	2	"Jar of Hearts"	Safe

Judges' votes to eliminate

- Cheloo: Station 4 – He complained that two of the band members have a lack of talent
- Matache: Tudor Toduț – backed her own act, Station 4
- Bittman: Station 4 – backed his own act, Tudor Toduț

=== Week 3 (25 November) ===
- Theme: Dance Music
- Group performance(s): "Rain Over Me", "Starships", "Only Girl (In the World)", "Moves like Jagger"
- Musical Guest: Alexis Jordan ("Happiness", "Good Girl")

Contestants' performances on the third live show
Act	Order	Song	Result
Ráduly Botond	1	"Let Me Entertain You"	Eliminated
Ioana Anuța	2	"Where Have You Been"	Safe
Nord X	3	"Perfect"	Safe
Dragoș Udilă	4	"Rolling in the Deep"	Safe
Nadir Tamuz	5	"Yeah!"	Bottom three
Tudor Turcu	6	"Are You Gonna Go My Way"	Safe
Red	7	"Don't Stop the Music"	Bottom three
Iulia Manolache	8	"Titanium"	Safe
Ioan Mann	9	"Everything"	Safe
Tudor Toduț	10	"Paparazzi"	Safe
Natalia Selegean	11	"Dance Again"	Safe
Final showdown details
Nadir Tamuz	1	"The Girl Is Mine"	Eliminated
Red	2	"Cannonball"	Safe

Judges' votes to eliminate

- Cheloo: Nadir Tamuz – gave no reason
- Matache: Nadir Tamuz – backed her own act, Red
- Bittman: Red – backed his own act, Nadir Tamuz

=== Week 4 (2 December) ===
- Theme: Romanian music
- Group performance(s): "Miorița", Medley songs Holograf
- Musical Guests: Margareta Pâslaru ("Libertate"), Paraziții ("Arde", "Toate-s la fel"), Stela Enache ("Ani de liceu"), Class ("Adu-i doina", "Toată lumea")

Contestants' performances on the fourth live show
Act	Order	Song	Result
Tudor Turcu	1	"Nunta"	Safe
Ioan Mann	2	"Ochii tăi"	Safe
Red	3	"De-ar fi să vii"	Safe
Ioana Anuța	4	"Pleacă"	Safe
Tudor Toduț	5	"Dac-ai ști"	Eliminated
Natalia Selegean	6	"Focul"	Safe
Dragoș Udilă	7	"Am bani de dat"	Bottom three
Nord X	8	"Fata din vis"	Bottom three
Iulia Manolache	9	"Dragostea rămâne"	Safe
Final showdown details
Dragoș Udilă	1	"Get Up, Stand Up"	Safe
Nord X	2	"We Are Young"	Eliminated

Judges' votes to eliminate

- Cheloo: Nord X – backed his own act, Dragoș Udilă
- Matache: Dragș Udilă – backed her own act, Nord X
- Bittman: Nord X – stated that Dragoș Udilă had delivered better performance throughout the night

=== Week 5 (8 December) ===
- Theme: Michael Jackson vs. Elvis Presley
- Musical Guests: Bonnie Tyler ("It's a Heartache", "Total Eclipse of the Heart"), Craig Harrison ("Bad", "Smooth Criminal")

Contestants' performances on the fifth live show
Act	Order	First song	Order	Second song	Result
Tudor Turcu	1	"Jailhouse Rock"	8	"Black or White"	Safe
Dragoș Udilă	2	"The Way You Make Me Feel"	9	"Heartbreak Hotel"	Safe
Ioana Anuța	3	"Blue Suede Shoes"	10	"Billie Jean"	Safe
Red	4	"You're Not Alone"	11	"It's Now or Never"	Safe
Natalia Selegean	5	"Suspicious Minds"	12	"Give in to Me"	Bottom three
Iulia Manolache	6	"Thriller"	13	"Can't Help Falling in Love"	Eliminated
Ioan Mann	7	"Always on My Mind"	14	"Human Nature"	Bottom three
Final showdown details
Ioan Mann	1	"Mandy"			Eliminated
Natalia Selegean	2	"Soulmate"			Safe

Judges' votes to eliminate

- Matache: Ioan Mann – backed Natalia Selegean "as a woman"
- Bittman: Natalia Selegean – stated that Ioan Mann was the only contestant who made him cry
- Cheloo: Ioan Mann – stated that Ioan Mann's path had to end here

=== Week 6 (16 December) ===
- Theme: Free Choice / Mentor's Choice
- Group performance(s): "Celebration", "We Are Family", "Boogie Wonderland", "I Will Survive"
- Musical Guest: Johnny Logan ("Hold Me Now", "What's Another Year"), Delia Matache ("Someone like You")

Contestants' performances on the sixth live show
Act	Order	First song	Order	Second song	Result
Dragoș Udilă	1	"Gone till November"	6	"Zaraza"	Eliminated
Red	2	"Le Le"	7	"Empire State of Mind"	Bottom three
Ioana Anuța	3	"Epilog"	8	"Lady Marmalade"	Safe
Natalia Selegean	4	"So What"	9	"Tu n-ai avut curaj"	Bottom three
Tudor Turcu	5	"Dincolo de nori"	10	"Don't Let the Sun Go Down on Me"	Safe
Final showdown details
Red	1	"Stand Up for Love"			Eliminated
Natalia Selegean	2	"You and I"			Safe

Judges' votes to eliminate

- Cheloo: Red – backed his own act, Natalia Selegean
- Matache: Natalia Selegean – backed her own act, Red
- Bittman: Red – stated that Natalia Selegean was more impressive

=== Week 7 (23 December) ===
- Theme: Audition Songs, Christmas songs, Duet songs
- Group performance(s): "Merry Christmas Everyone"
- Musical Guest: Paula Seling & Al Bano ("Figlio delle Ande", Medley-"Sharazan", "Ci sarà", "Felicità"), Lexter ("Freedom to Love", "Peace & Love"), Diana Cazan ("La Viflaim, colo-n jos")

Round 1

Contestants' performances on the seventh live show
Act	Order	Audition Song	Order	Duet song	Result
Natalia Selegean	4	"Holding Out for a Hero"	1	"Hallelujah" (with Elena Gheorghe)	Third Place
Ioana Anuța	2	"Halo"	5	"Broken Strings" (with Andrei Leonte)	Safe
Tudor Turcu	6	"Dacă ploaia s-ar opri"	3	"Proud Mary" (with Delia Matache)	Safe

Round 2

Contestants' performances on the final live show
Act	Christmas song	Result
Ioana Anuța	"All I Want for Christmas Is You"	Runner-up
Tudor Turcu	"Santa Claus Is Coming to Town"	Winner

== Ratings ==
Ep	Title	Date	National			Urban			Source
Ep	Title	Date	Average (thousands)	Rating (%)	Peak (thousands)	Average (thousands)	Rating (%)	Peak (thousands)	Source
1	Auditions 1	23 September 2012	1,660	8.7	2,590	1,144	10.9	1,760	
2	Auditions 2	30 September 2012	1,466	7.7	2,215	1,040	9.9	1,511	
3	Auditions 3	7 October 2012	1,433	7.5	2,260	987	9.4	1,510	
4	Auditions 4	14 October 2012	1,320	6.9		894	8.5	1,429	
5	Auditions 5	21 October 2012	1,469	7.7		973	9.3	1,429	
6	Auditions 6	22 October 2012	1,500	8.1		988	9.4	1,352	
7	Bootcamp 1	28 October 2012	959	5.0		639	6.1		
8	Bootcamp 2	29 October 2012	1,145	6.0		779	7.4		
9	Judges' houses	4 November 2012	927	4.9		606	5.8		
10	Live show 1	11 November 2012	844	4.4		600	5.7		
11	Live show 2	18 November 2012	810	4.3		578	5.5		
12	Live show 3	25 November 2012	983	5.2		654	6.2		
13	Live show 4	4 December 2012	—N/a						
14	Live show 5	8 December 2012	932	4.4		573	4.9		
15	Semifinal	16 December 2012	858	4.5		591	5.6		
16	Final	23 December 2012	1 241	6.5		794	7.6		
