= MTV Romania Music Awards 2004 =

2004 MTV Romania Music Awards
- Date: 3 June 2004
- Location: Sala Palatului, Bucharest

Television/radio coverage
- Network: MTV Romania

The third MTV Romania Music Awards (Romanian: Premiile muzicale MTV România) was held on June 3, 2004 at Sala Palatului, Bucharest.

== Nominees/Winners ==
=== Best Female Artist ===
- Andra - Vreau sărutarea ta
- Delia - Ce vor de la mine
- Loredana - Femeia ta WINNER
- Nicola - Dincolo de noapte
- Paula Seling - Timpul

=== Best Male Artist ===
- Cheloo - Vicii
- Emanuel - Pentru amîndoi
- Marcel Pavel Doar pentru tine
- Pepe - Amor gitano
- Ştefan Bănica, Jr. - Am s-o aştept WINNER

=== Best Pop ===
- Andra - Vreau sărutarea ta
- Andreea vs Fabrizio - Cînd dansam
- Class - Luna mi-a zîmbit WINNER
- Hara - Cine
- Voltaj - Noapte bună

=== Best Album ===
- Băieţi buni - BUG Mafia WINNER
- Sindromul Tourette - Cheloo
- Fata cu şosete de diamant - Loredana
- Disco-Zone - O-Zone
- 450 de oi - Zdob si Zdub

=== Best Etno ===
- Benone Sinulescu - Lelita cîrciumăreasa
- Datina - Trec ţiganii
- Etnic - Blestem
- Loredana - Zig-zagga
- Zdob si Zdub - Everybody in the casa mare WINNER

=== Best Song ===
- Clipe - 3rei Sud Est WINNER
- Româneste - BUG Mafia
- Luna mi-a zîmbit - Class
- Dragostea mea - Holograf
- Dragostea din tei - O-Zone

=== Best Hip-Hop ===
- BUG Mafia - Româneste WINNER
- Cheloo - Vicii
- Codu’ Penal - Mod de viaţă
- La Familia - Viaţa bună
- Parazitii - Bad joke

=== Best Group ===
- 3rei Sud Est - Clipe
- BUG Mafia - Româneşte
- Holograf - Dragostea mea
- Simplu - O secundă
- Voltaj - Noapte bună WINNER

=== Best Dance ===
- Akcent - Suflet pereche
- Impact - Îngerul meu
- O-Zone - Dragostea din tei WINNER
- Sexxy - Sexy şi rea
- Simplu - O secundă

=== Best Rock ===
- AB 4 - Cold
- Cargo - Dacă ploaia s-ar opri WINNER
- Iris - Nu mă uita
- Vita de vie - Totata
- Zdob si Zdub - Everybody in the casa mare

=== Best Video ===
- AB 4 - Cold
- Andra feat. Tiger One - Vreau sărutarea ta WINNER
- Anna Lesko - Inocenta
- BUG Mafia - Româneşte
- Loredana - Femeia ta

=== Best New Act ===
- Avantgarde -Alina
- Fizz - Eşti fitzoasa
- Gia - Nu mă opri
- Praf în ochi - În mintea ta
- Spicy - Bikini party WINNER

=== Best Live ===
- Cheloo
- Loredana
- Partizan
- Vita de vie WINNER
- Zdob si Zdub

=== Best Website ===
- www.fizz.ro
- www.gia.ro WINNER
- www.refflex.ro
- www.vamaveche.ro
- www.voltaj.ro

=== Free Your Mind ===
- Paşi spre toleranţă (McCann Erickson)

=== Life Time Achievement Award ===
- Gică Petrescu
