= Slalom printre cretini =

Studio album by Paraziții
- Released: November 22, 2007
- Genre: Hip hop
- Length: 60:03
- Label: Cat Music

Paraziții chronology
Confort 3 (2005)	Slalom printre cretini (2007)	Tot ce e bun tre' să dispară (2010)

Slalom printre cretini ("Drifting Among Morons") is the ninth studio album by Romanian rap group Paraziții. It was released on November 22, 2007.

== Track list ==
No.	Title	Text	Length
1.	"Mesaj pentru Europa" (Message for Europe)	Cheloo	3:05
2.	"Vreau să vă doară" (I Want It Hurt You)	Cheloo, Ombladon	3:12
3.	"Dușmăniți-mă toți" (You All Can Hate Me)	Cheloo, Ombladon	3:29
4.	"Din colțul blocului" (From The Block's Corner)	Cheloo, Ombladon	3:49
5.	"Slalom printre cretini" (Drifting Among Morons)	Cheloo, Ombladon	3:12
6.	"Cu microfonul deschis" (Open Mic Session – feat. Killa Kela, MC Tripp)	Killa Kela, MC Tripp, Cheloo, Ombladon	3:14
7.	"Mereu la subiect" (Always To The Point – feat. Shabazz the Disciple)	Shabazz the Disciple, Cheloo, Ombladon	3:25
8.	"La limita penibilului" (To The Limit of Ridicule)	Cheloo, Ombladon	0:55
9.	"Goana după iluzii" (Chasing Illusions)	Cheloo, Ombladon	3:42
10.	"Total dubios" (Totally Shady – feat. Cilvaringz)	Cilvaringz, Cheloo, Ombladon	3:13
11.	"Tu nu contezi" (You Don't Matter)	Cheloo	1:05
12.	"De ziua ta" (On Your Birthday)	Cheloo, Ombladon	4:44
13.	"Fără resentimente" (No Hard Feelings)	Cheloo, Ombladon	3:18
14.	"Something to say" (feat. Raekwon)	Raekwon, Cheloo, Ombladon	4:31
15.	"Concentrați în metropole" (Clumped Together in Metropolises)	Cheloo	2:57
16.	"Unu pentru toți" (One For All)	Cheloo, Ombladon	3:03
17.	"Moartea întreabă de tine" (Death Is Asking About You – feat. Mihai Mărgineanu)	Cheloo, Ombladon	4:01
18.	"Needitat" (Uncut)	Cheloo, Ombladon	1:02
19.	"Drogurile schimbă tot" (Drugs Change Everything)	Cheloo, Ombladon	3:43
20.	"Pabibabum"	Cheloo, Ombladon	1:34
21.	"Politicianul român" (Romanian Politician – feat. Mircea Badea)	Mircea Badea	4:15
Total length:			60:03
