= Bogdan Bratis =

Artist

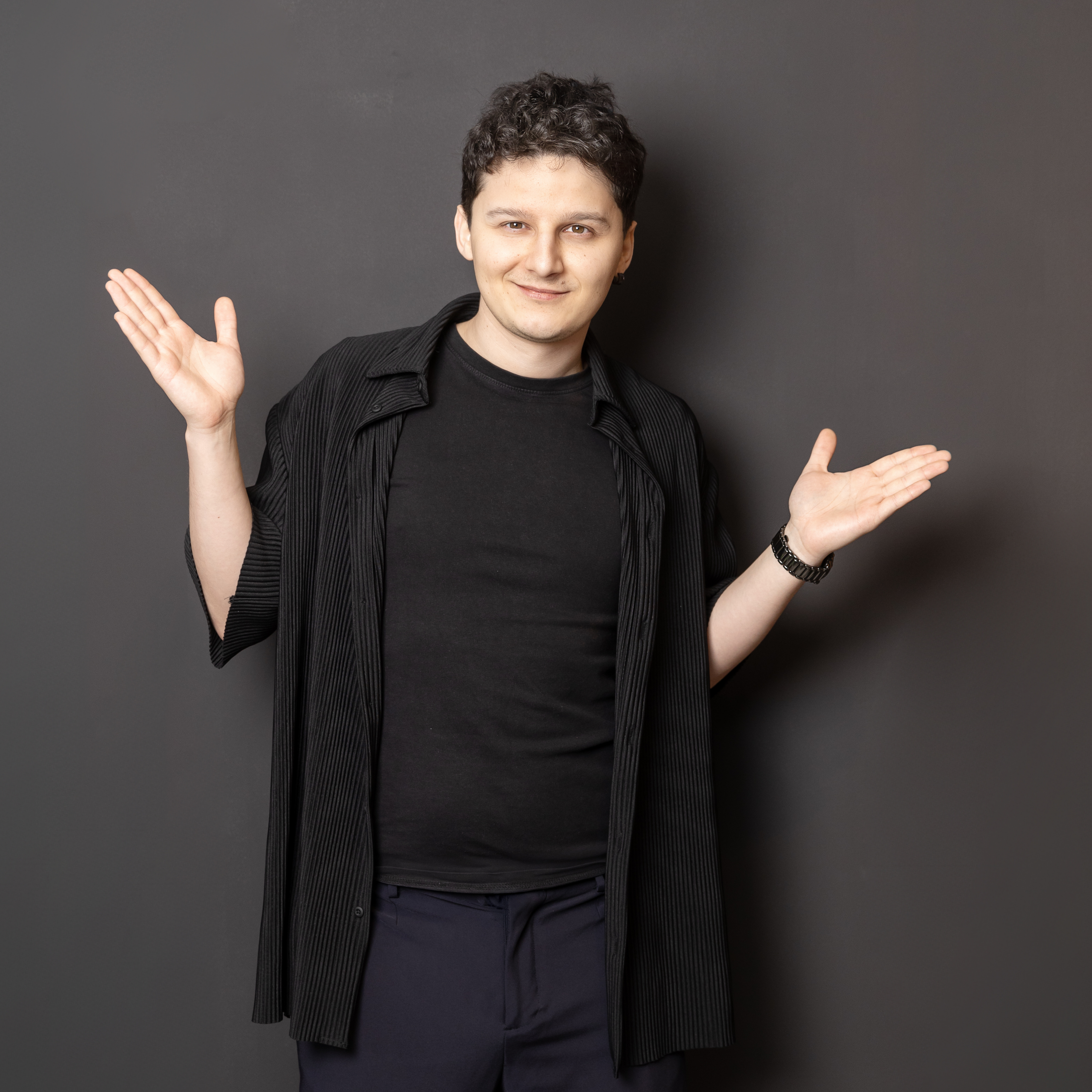
- Bogdan Bratis in 2025
- Born: September 15, 1996 (age 29); Satu Mare, Romania
- Occupations: Entrepreneur, musician, podcast producer
- Known for: Finalist on X Factor Romania (2013), CEO of Saspod

Bogdan Bratiș (born 15 September 1996) is a Romanian entrepreneur, musician, and podcast producer. He gained national recognition as a finalist on the third season of X Factor Romania in 2013. He is the founder and CEO of Saspod, a podcast production and distribution company based in the United Kingdom.

== Early life and education ==
Bratis was born in Satu Mare, Romania, where he spent most of his childhood studying music. In 2014, he moved to Bucharest to start a music career and played in several bands. In 2016, he pursued his higher education at Southampton Solent University in the United Kingdom and graduated with a First Class Degree in Popular Music Production.

== Career ==
=== Music career ===
Bratis rose to fame on X Factor Romania Season 3, debuting in the auditions with the song "Apologise" by OneRepublic. He reached fourth place but was eliminated by the public in the final. The last song he played on the show was "Rule The World" by Take That.

During the competition, the Satu Mare council received criticism for initiating a public campaign to support Bratis. The same council faced similar controversy when they supported Tincuța Fernea, another singer from the region, who competed in Season 5 of Vocea României.

After X Factor, Bratis joined the band Marfar and toured across Romania as a lead singer. Florin Ristei, the winner of X Factor Romania 2013, had previously performed in the same band. He later signed a record deal with Sprint Media Music for the single “Și Noi Dansăm”.

=== Podcasting and entrepreneurship ===
In 2019, Bratis launched a full-service podcast production agency in the United Kingdom called Saw & Sine (SAS). The company rebranded to Saspod in 2021 as part of a strategic repositioning.

=== The Pod Files ===
In 2025, Bratis launched The Pod Files, a podcast featuring interviews with digital creators, marketers, and entrepreneurs focused on trends in the creator economy.

== Personal life ==
Bogdan Bratis has a son and currently lives in Glasgow.
