= Lovitură de pedeapsă =

Studio album by Paraziții
- Released: February 29, 2016
- Genre: Hip hop
- Length: 33:16

Paraziții chronology
Tot ce e bun tre' să dispară (2010)	Lovitură de pedeapsă (2016)

Lovitură de pedeapsă ("Penalty Kick") is the 11th studio album by Romanian rap group Paraziții.

== Track listing ==
No.	Title	Length
1.	"Circulă zvonul" (Rumor Goes)	3:42
2.	"Adevărul doare" (Truth Hurts)	4:01
3.	"Demnitate (rap mix)" (Dignity - rap mix - featuring Daniel Lazăr)	2:41
4.	"Viața bate filmul" (Truth Is Stranger Than Fiction - featuring Bitză)	3:24
5.	"Poliția trece" (Police Pass By)	3:14
6.	"Cântec de leagăn" (Lullaby)	1:13
7.	"Te facem să sari" (We Make You Jump)	2:48
8.	"Mambo Nr. 9"	3:30
9.	"Suge-o" (Suck It)	2:53
10.	"Toată lumea fumează" (Everybody Smokes - featuring Adrian Despot)	4:09
11.	"Demnitate" (Dignity - featuring Daniel Lazăr)	3:41
Total length:		60:03
