= Dănutz SRL =

Dănutz S.R.L. is a TV show broadcast on TVR1 from 2004 to 2013. The show was presented by Dan Bittman. Antonio Passarelli and his band Marfar were the permanent guests.
