= Holograf =

Romanian rock band

- Origin: Bucharest, Romania
- Genre: Classic rock · new wave · pop rock · hard rock (1977–1987) · arena rock · glam rock · glam metal (1988–1995) · pop rock · soft rock (after 1996)
- Years active: 1977–present
- Label: Electrecord · Capitan Records Company · Zone Records · MediaPro Music · Roton · Holograf Production
- Members: Dan Bittman (vocalist); Romeo Dediu (guitar, vocals); Tino Furtună (keyboards, piano, vocals); Edi Petroșel (drums, vocals); Emil Soumah (percussion, fiddle – collaborator)
- Past members: Mihai Pocorschi · Ștefan Rădescu · Eugen Sonia · Cristian Lesciuc · Dan Ionescu · Lucian Rusu · Ionel Petrov · Cornel Stănescu · George Petrineanu · Nikos Temistocle · Sorin Ciobanu · Gabriel Cotabiță · Mihai Marty Popescu · Nuțu Olteanu · Florin Ochescu · Mihai Coman · Iulian Vrabete
- Website: https://holograf.ro/

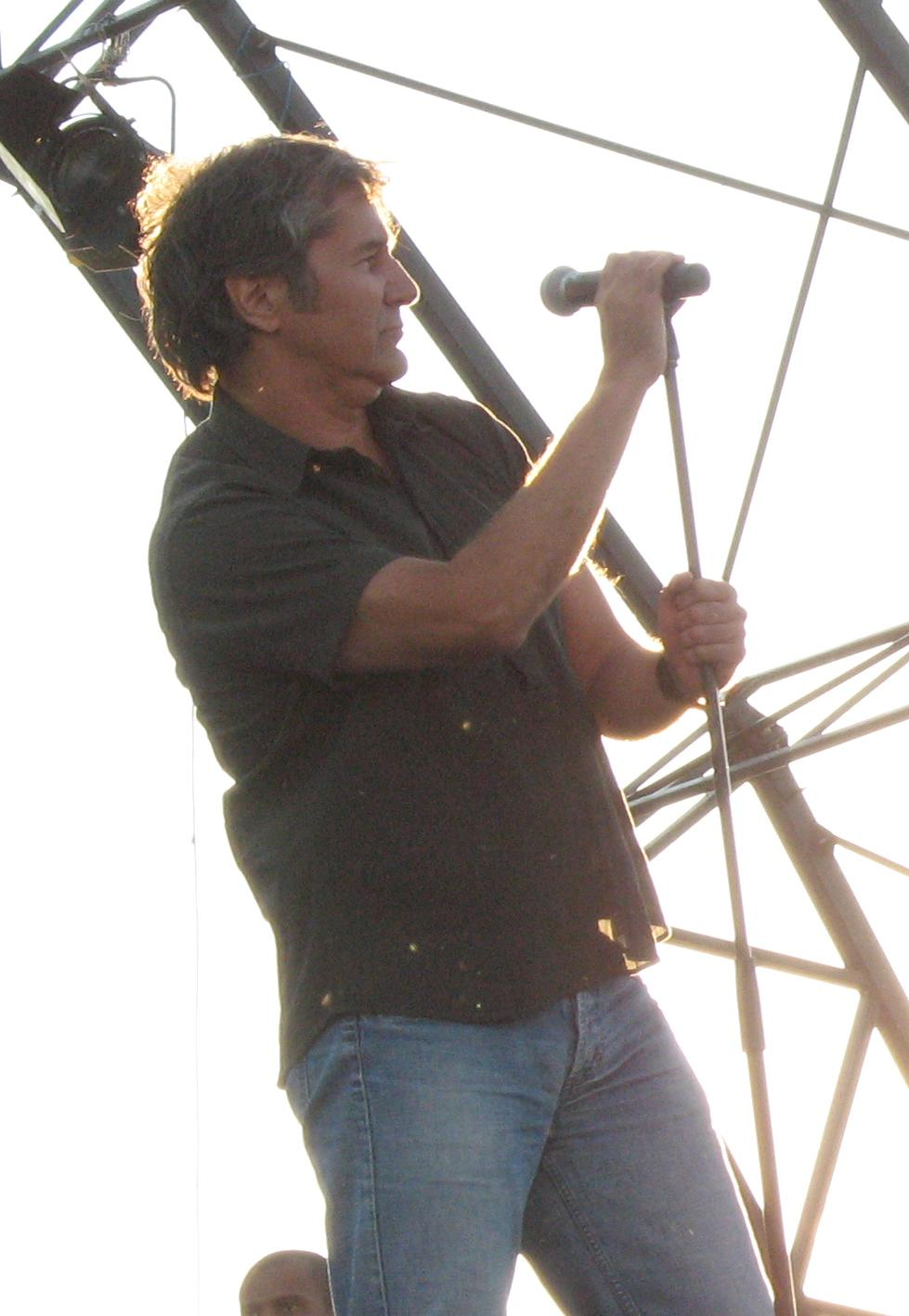
Dan Bittman, the lead singer of Holograf

Holograf is a pop rock band from Bucharest, Romania. Since the band's formation in 1978, Holograf released 18 albums. The band won the Excellence Prize at Romanian Media Music Awards in 2013, the awards for best pop-rock artist and best pop-rock song at Radio Romania Music Awards Gala in 2014 and was nominated multiple times at Romanian Music Awards for Best Group and for Best Song.

== History ==
It was founded in 1978 by Mihai Pocorschi (guitar, voice), Eugen Sonia (bass guitar), Cristian Lesciuc (solo guitar) and Boris Petroff (drums). In 1979 Edi Petroșel (drums) and Tino Furtună (keyboards) joined and are still part of the band. The band received awards at Club A Festival and at other festivals, which helped the band getting signed with Electrecord, the biggest Romanian label at that time, and released Holograf 1 in 1983. In 1988 Holograf released Holograf III, which was sold over 200,000 copies. Holograf continued making music through the 1980s and 1990s, when it toured abroad in countries such as Bulgaria, USSR, East Germany, Poland, North Korea, and the Netherlands. In April 1990 Holograf performed at the Printemps de Bourges Festival. It released a few new works into the new millennium, including the album Pur si simplu (2003). Since 1985, the lead singer of the band is Dan Bittman.

The band is known for hits including "Banii vorbesc", "Dincolo de nori" (which Dan Bittman also sang at Eurovision Song Contest 1994), "Ți-am dat un inel", "Undeva departe", "Să nu-mi iei niciodată dragostea", "Viața are gust" and "Cât de departe". In November 2000, Holograf launched Holografica, which sold over 100,000 copies in the first two weeks of release. In 2003 the band launched Pur și simplu, an album which sold over 250.000 copies, and received gold and platinum certification. In order to promote Pur și simplu, Holograf started toured in Romania for 50 days. On October 10, 2006, Holograf released a new album called Taina. The disc contained 10 new songs, and the first single to be promoted from the album was "Ești atât de frumoasă" ("You are so beautiful"). On July 10, 2009, Holograf received a Gold certification from UPFR for record sales of the Primăvara începe cu tine album. Holograf performed at five editions of the Golden Stag Festival, in 1993, 1997, 2001, 2005 and 2009, and multiple times at the Mamaia Festival since 1987 and Callatis Festival.

The Holograf song "Cât de departe" (English: How far), was broadcast most often on Romanian radio stations, between 2010 and 2015.

Their bassist, Iulian "Mugurel" Vrabete, died from cancer on 12 March 2026, at the age of 70.

== Members ==
- Mihai Pocorschi – guitar, lead vocals, backing vocals (1977–1986)
- Ștefan Rădescu – lead vocals (1977–1982)
- Eugen Sonia – bass (1977–1981)
- Cristian Lesciuc – guitar (1977–1978)
- Dan Ionescu – guitar (1977–1978)
- Lucian Rusu – drums (1977)
- Ionel 'Boris' Petrov – drums (1977–1978)
- Emilian 'Edi' Petroșel – drums, backing vocals (1978–present)
- Cornel Stănescu – guitar, backing vocals (1978–1982)
- Antoniu 'Tino' Furtună – keyboards, piano, backing vocals (1978–present)
- George 'Gică' Petrineanu – bass (1981–1982, 1984)
- Nikos Temistocle – bass (1983–1984)
- Sorin Ciobanu – guitar (1983–1984)
- Gabriel Cotabiță – lead vocals (1983–1985)
- Mihai 'Marty' Popescu – bass (1984–1987)
- Dan Bittman – lead vocals (1985–present)
- Ion 'Nuțu' Olteanu – guitar, backing vocals (1986–1990)
- Iulian 'Mugurel' Vrabete – bass, backing vocals (1987–2026, his death)
- Florin Ochescu – guitar (1990–1993)
- Romeo Dediu – guitar, backing vocals (1993–present)
- Marius Bațu – acoustic guitar, backing vocals (collaborator 1996–present)
- Emil Soumah – percussion, harmonica (collaborator 2000–present)
- Mihai Coman – keyboards, guitar, backing vocals, sound (collaborator 2001–2017)

== Discography ==
=== Studio albums ===
- Holograf 1 (LP, Electrecord, 1983)
- Holograf 2 (LP/MC, Electrecord, 1987)
- Holograf III (LP/MC, Electrecord, 1988)
- Banii vorbesc (LP/MC, Electrecord, 1991)
- World Full of Lies (CD, Capitan Records Company, 1993; reissued in 2013)
- Stai în poala mea (LP/CD/MC, Electrecord, 1995)
- Supersonic (CD/MC, MediaPro Music, 1998; reissued in 2000)
- Holografica (CD/MC, MediaPro Music, 2000; reissued in 2019 on vinyl)
- Pur și simplu (CD/MC, Holograf Production & Roton, 2003; reissued in 2013)
- Taina (CD/MC, Holograf Production & Roton, 2006; reissued in 2013)
- Love Affair (CD, MediaPro Music, 2012)
- Life Line (CD/LP, MediaPro Music & Universal Music România, 2015)

=== Live albums ===
- 69% Unplugged – Live (CD/MC, Zone Records, 1996; reissued in 1997 and 2001)
- Live – Vinarte (promo CD, Holograf Production & Vinarte, 2005)
- Patria Unplugged (CD, MediaPro Music, 2011)

=== Singles and maxi-singles ===
- "Holograf Patru" (or "Holograf 4") (maxi-single, Electrecord, 1990)
- "World Full of Lies" (single, Electrecord, 1991)
- "Viața are gust" (promo single, MediaPro Music & Coca-Cola, 2001)
- "Pierd înălțimea din ochii tăi" (single, MediaPro Music, 2019)
- "N-ai de ce să pleci" (single, MediaPro Music, 2020)
- "Cum bate inima ta" (single, MediaPro Music, 2021)

=== Compilations ===
- Undeva departe (CD/MC, MediaPro Music, 1999; reissued in 2000)
- Best of Holograf – Dimineață în altă viață (CD/MC, MediaPro Music, 2002)
- Balade (promo CD, Roton & City Park, 2008)
- Primăvara începe cu tine (CD, MediaPro Music, 2009)
- Muzică de colecție, Vol. 104 (2xCD, Jurnalul Național, 2009)
- Fericirea începe acasă! (promo CD, MediaPro Music & Millennium Bank, 2010)

=== Video albums ===
- O noapte cu Holograf (DVD, Holograf Production, 2004; reissued in 2013)
- Pur și simplu (DVD, Holograf Production, 2004)
- Concert Taina (DVD, Holograf Production & Roton, 2009)
- Patria Unplugged (DVD, MediaPro Music, 2011)
- Vedere de la Costinești (unreleased DVD, published on the band's YouTube page, 2017)

=== Other releases ===
- Formații de muzică pop 3 (LP, Electrecord, 1979) – collective album, the track "Lungul drum al zilei către noapte"
- Dincolo de nori (maxi-single, Metro Records România, 1994) – released as a solo album by Dan Bittman
- Timpul chitarelor (DVD, TVR Media, 2009) – video album, the video for "Cu fiecare clipă" (filmed at Hotel Forum in Costinești, 1987)

=== Books ===
- Carmen Olaru – Holograf: Să nu-mi iei niciodată dragostea... (Nemira, Bucharest, 2002)

== Awards and nominations ==
Year	Award	Category	For	Result	Notes
2004	MTV Romania Music Awards	Best Song	"Dragostea mea"	Nominated	
2004	MTV Romania Music Awards	Best Group	Holograf	Nominated	
2007	MTV Romania Music Awards	Best Pop	"Ești așa frumoasă"	Nominated	
2007	MTV Romania Music Awards	Best Album	Taina	Nominated	

- Excellence Prize at Romanian Media Music Awards in 2013.
- Best pop-rock artist and best pop-rock song at Radio Romania Music Awards Gala in 2014 for "Morning dew"
- Nomination for Romanian Music Award for Best Rock and Best Group 2014 for Holograf ft Antonia – Intoarce-te acasa
