= Mihai Morar =

Romanian TV presenter, editor and DJ (born 1981)

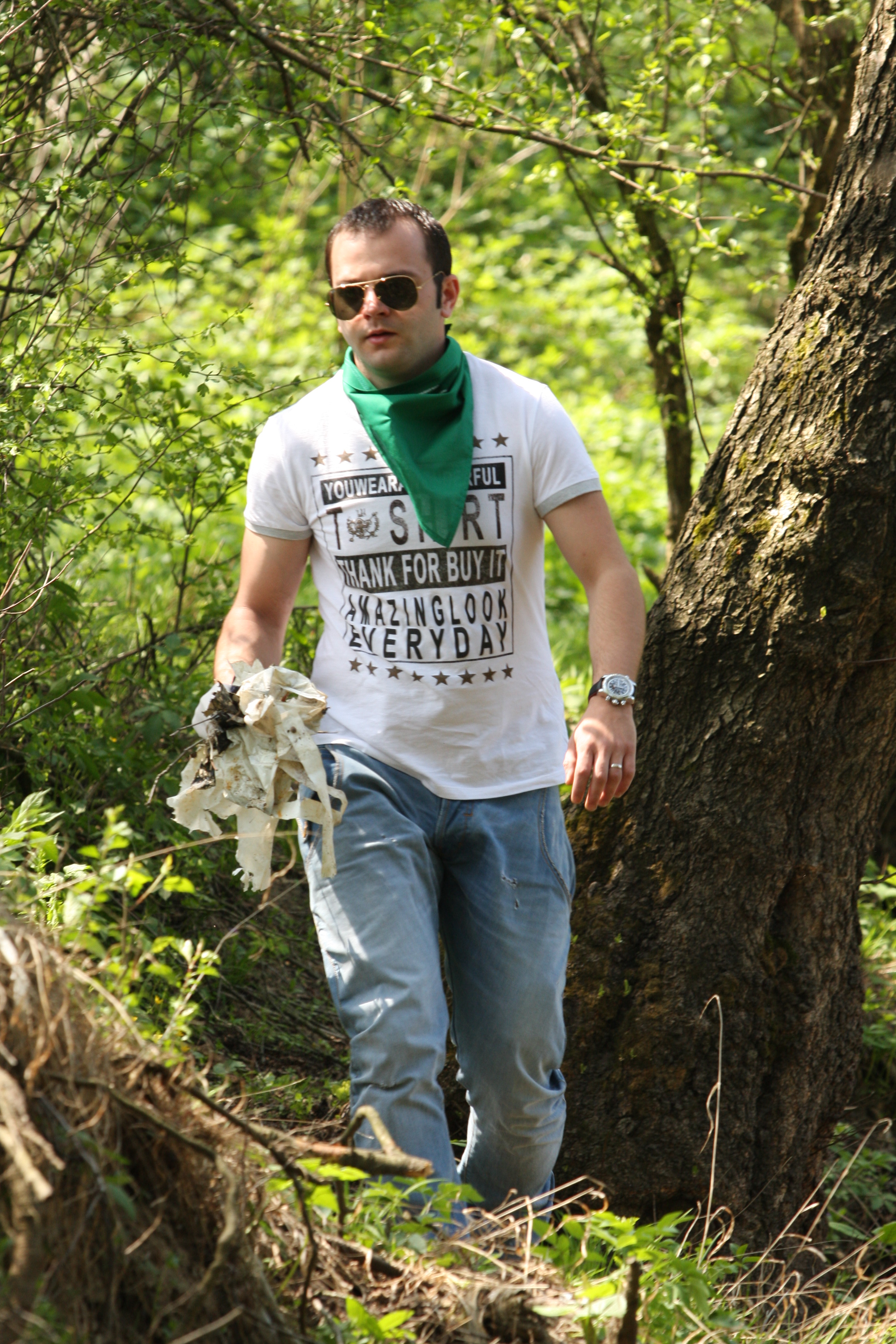
Morar during a forest cleanup in 2008

Mihai Ionuț Morar (born 14 October 1981 in Baia Mare) is a Romanian TV presenter, editor and DJ.

== Career ==
Morar hosts the morning show Radio Zu, with Daniel Buzdugan, and show Răi da' Buni on Antena 2. In 2011 he was part of the jury on the Romanian X Factor.

In 2018 the presenter was chosen by 20th Century Fox to provide the Romanian voice of Alvin in the live-action movie Alvin and the Chipmunks: The Road Chip, alongside Antonia (Jeanette) and Andreea Antonescu (Brittany) for the Romanian version.

== Controversy ==
Between 2006-2011, Mihai Morar and his radio show colleague Daniel Buzdugan were accused several times of stealing texts from bloggers and newspapers; texts they were reading on air on their morning show at Radio ZU without permission or proper credit. One blogger, Radu Bazavan, sued them in 2011, but the trial was delayed for 7 years until the deeds expired.
