= Florin Ristei =

Romanian singer

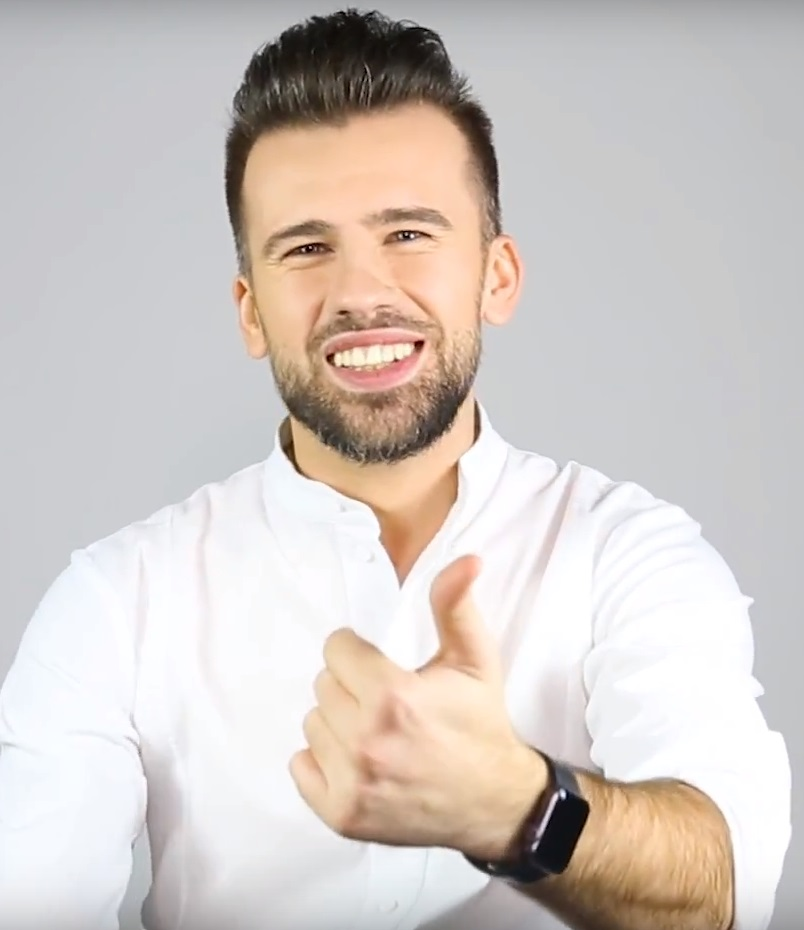
- Born: Traian Florin Ristei; 29 August 1987 (age 38); Galați, Romania
- Partner: Naomi Hedman
- Musical career
- Genres: Pop rock; pop
- Occupations: singer; television presenter
- Instruments: Vocals; violin; piano; guitar; bass; drums
- Years active: 2000–present
- Labels: Cat Music; Music Expert Records

Florin Ristei (born Traian Florin Ristei; 29 August 1987) is a Romanian singer and television presenter. He was born in the city of Galați, Romania, but he currently lives in Bucharest. He is best known for his debut single, "Dana" (together with his former band, Amici) and for winning the third season of the X Factor Romania in 2013.

In 2012, Universal Pictures chose Ristei to sing the main songs the animated movie Disney Magical Music, alongside Paula Seling, and Dalma Kovacs who provide the Romanian version of the film.

== Life and career ==
=== 1987–2012: Early life, Amici and Marfar ===
Ristei attended the General School No. 10 from Galați. His teachers say that he excelled as a student; as a child he was very ambitious, but he also worked hard. He was discovered in 1999 by Lucian Pintilie at a karaoke contest in Constanţa, held by Prima TV. Pintilie wanted to make a film together with Ristei, but after a year of trying, the project did not materialize. Ristei later became the lead singer of the band Amici. It was, at that time, the youngest pop-rock band in Romania. In 2000, they released the smash hit "Dana", with which they entered the national music charts. Together, they released 2 EPs, an album and appeared on a compilation. In 2005, he joined the band Marfar. The band's biggest hit was "Baby Marinaru'" (transl. "Baby Sailor")

=== 2012–present: FreeStay, X Factor and great national success ===
In 2012, Ristei formed the musical project FreeStay, which meant Ristei's return to the national music market. The project's debut song, "Ea a fost Dana" (transl. "She was Dana"), reached Romania's radio and TV stations. They participated on Romania's national selection for the Eurovision Song Contest 2013 with the song "Criminal Mind", placing 9th in the final.

In 2013, Ristei auditioned for the third season of the X Factor Romania talent show. His performances were highly appreciated by both the jury and the viewers, subsequently winning the competition.

He later released the songs "Altfel de magie" (transl. "Another Kind of Magic"), "Cerșetori de iubire" (transl. "Beggars of Love") and "Trebuia să fii tu" (transl. "It had to be You").

In 2016, Ristei released the hit "Las-o..." (transl. "Let her...") together with the rapper Vescan. The song reached number one on Romanian charts. This was followed by many collaborations with top-charting Romanian artists such as: What's Up for the song "Facem ce vrem" (transl. "We do what we want."), Andra for the song "Între noi nu mai e nimic" (transl. "There is nothing between us anymore") and Smiley, who wrote the music and lyrics for the song "Îmi place prietena ei" (transl. "I like her friend").

In 2017, he won the award for the Best Romanian Male Voice at the Radio Romania Awards gala.

In 2020, Ristei became a judge on the ninth season of the X Factor Romania, this way becoming the first ever X Factor Romania winner to ever become a judge later in the show.

== Personal life ==
Florin is currently in a relationship with X Factor season 9 contestant Naomi Hedman, raising suspicions about backstage business. He is the first and only X Factor Romania judge to have ever become involved in a relationship with a contestant.

== Accolades ==
Year	Award	Category	Recipient	Result	Source
2017	Radar de Media Awards	Sexiest Male Star	Himself	Won	
2017	Radio România Awards	Best Romanian Male Voice	Himself	Won	

== Discography ==
=== As featured artist ===
Title	Year	Peak chart positions		Album
Title	Year	Romania Radio Airplay	Romania TV Airplay	Album
"Las-o…"; Vescan featuring Florin Ristei	2016	1	1	Non-album single
"Facem ce vrem" What's Up featuring Florin Ristei	2017	—	—	Non-album single

=== With Amici ===
- 2000: Dana (EP)
- 2000: Iernatik (Compilation)
- 2001: Fata blondă (transl. "The blonde girl") (Album)
- 2003: ASL PLS (EP)
