= Dan Bittman =

Romanian singer and television presenter (born 1962)

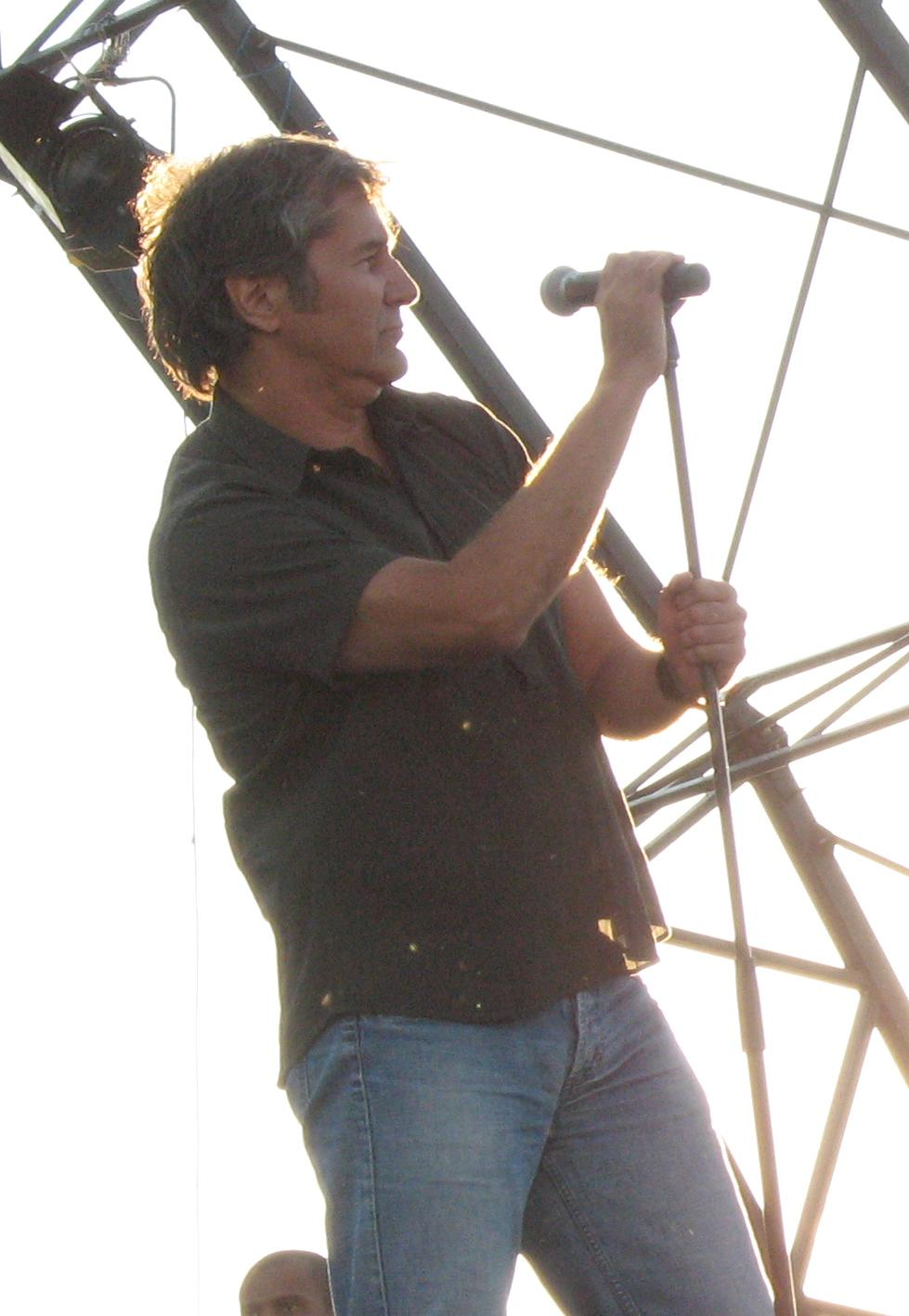
- Dan Bittman performing with Holograf at Live Earth, Bucharest, 7 July 2007

Background information
- Born: Dan Bittman; 29 March 1962 (age 64); Bucharest, Romania
- Genres: Hard rock; Pop rock
- Occupations: Singer; songwriter; television presenter
- Instrument: Vocals
- Years active: 1980–present
- Member of: Holograf

Dan Bittman (Romanian pronunciation: [ˈdan ˈbitman]; born 29 March 1962) is a Romanian singer, songwriter and television presenter. He is the lead vocalist of the Romanian rock band Holograf and represented Romania at the Eurovision Song Contest 1994 with the song "Dincolo de nori", finishing 21st with 14 points.

== Career ==
Bittman began his musical career in the early 1980s, performing with bands such as Blitz and Incognito.

Between 1984 and 1985, he was the lead singer of the Romanian rock band IRIS. In 1985, he joined Holograf, becoming the band's lead vocalist.

With Holograf, he recorded numerous albums, including Holograf 2 (1987), Banii vorbesc (1992), Stai în poala mea (1995), Supersonic (1998), Pur și simplu (2003), Taina (2006), Primăvara începe cu tine (2009) and Love Affair (2012).

In 1994, Bittman represented Romania at the Eurovision Song Contest 1994 with "Dincolo de nori".

From 2004 to 2012, he hosted the television show Dănutz SRL on TVR 1.

In 2008, Bittman provided a voice in the Romanian dubbed version of Disney's The Emperor's New Groove.

== Personal life ==
Bittman was in a long-term relationship with Liliana Ștefan, with whom he has three sons: Alexandru, Patrick and Mark.

Although the couple were together for many years, they never married and reportedly separated in the early 2020s.

In 2015, Bittman underwent surgery following vocal cord health problems, temporarily interrupting his musical activity.

Bittman is of Jewish descent.

== Discography ==
=== With Blitz ===
- 1980 – Concert performances at Clubul de la ora șapte

=== With Incognito ===
- 1982–1984 – Demo recordings

=== With IRIS ===
- Demo recordings (1984–1985)

=== With Holograf ===
- Holograf 2 (1987)
- Holograf 3 (1988)
- Holograf 4 (1989)
- World Full of Lies (1990)
- Banii vorbesc (1992)
- Stai în poala mea (1995)
- Holograf 69% Unplugged (1996)
- Supersonic (1998)
- Undeva departe (1999)
- Holografica (2000)
- Best Of – Dimineață în altă viață (2002)
- Pur și simplu (2003)
- Taina (2006)
- Primăvara începe cu tine (2009)
- Love Affair (2012)
- Life Line (2015)

=== Solo ===
- Dincolo de nori (1994)
- Și îngerii au demonii lor (2015)

Awards and achievements
Preceded by N/A	Romania in the Eurovision Song Contest; 1994	Succeeded by Mălina Olinescu with "Eu cred"
Preceded by Dida Drăgan with "Nu pleca"	Winner of Selecţia Naţională; 1994	Succeeded by Monica Anghel and Sincron with "Rugă pentru pacea lumii"
