= X Factor (Romanian TV series) season 8 =

X Factor
- Season 8
- Hosted by: Mihai Bendeac; Vlad Drăgulin
- Judges: Delia Matache; Horia Brenciu; Ștefan Bănică, Jr. Carla's Dreams
- Winner: Bella Santiago
- Winning mentor: Delia Matache
- Runner-up: Ioana Bulgaru

Release
- Original network: Antena 1
- Original release: August 26 – December 23, 2018

Season chronology
- ← Previous; Season 7 Next → Season 9

X Factor is a Romanian television music competition that aims to find a new music talent to become a star. The eighth started airing on 26 August 2018 on Antena 1.

The hosts of season 8 were Mihai Bendeac and Vlad Drăgulin. Delia Matache, Horia Brenciu, Carla's Dreams and Ștefan Bănică, Jr. returned to the judging panel.

== Judges ==
- Delia Matache

Delia Matache is a famous Romanian eurobeat singer-songwriter, TV celebrity, dancer, philanthropist, former model, fashion designer. She has started her stage music activity in 1999 in N&D music band with Nicolae Marin and had released 4 albums, and after the split off in 2003 she had released another two solo albums.

- Horia Brenciu

Horia Brenciu is a Romanian singer, television host for the Romanian version of Dancing with the Stars, successful entertainer, and philanthropist. He studied at National College Andrei Şaguna from Braşov, then he continued to Şcoala Populară de Artă Braşov, at piano and canto class, and in 1998 he finished The Theater Academy in Bucharest.

- Ștefan Bănică, Jr.

Ștefan Bănică, Jr. is a Romanian entertainer, of roma people origin from his father side, TV presenter, one of the most important Romanian TV personality, the son of actor Ștefan Bănică. He is well known in Romanian for presenting the Romania version of “Dancing with the Stars”, the largest dance competition ever aired in Romania, broadcast on Pro TV.

- Carla's Dreams

Carla's Dreams is a Moldavian musical project which was started by Dobra Robertin 2012. The band is an anonymous group of singers and composers who sing in Romanian, Russian and English. During concerts, the band's vocalist, to hide his identity, wears hood and sunglasses, and his face is masked.

Established in Chișinău, Carla's Dreams combines several musical styles, including hip hop, jazz, rock and pop. The first song produced by Carla's Dreams was Dă-te ("Get Off"). Carla's Dreams has launched in Romania in 2013, along with Inna with the song P.O.H.U.I., later to sing with Loredana Lumea ta ("Your World"), and in 2015 with Delia, releasing songs Cum ne noi ("How We Us") and Da, mamă ("Yes, Mother").

== Auditions ==
Cities that auditions and/or pre-auditions were held in.

Audition process was based on the British and American version. First up were "The Producer's Audition", where the producers chose singers to proceed to the second phase which was "The Audition before the Judging panel".

Summary of auditions
City	Auditions date
Oradea	April 27, 2018
Iași	April 28, 2018
Timișoara	April 29, 2018
Galați	April 30, 2018
Sibiu	May 1, 2018
Craiova	May 3, 2018

The auditions were broadcast from 26 August 2018 until 26 October 2018. The auditions consisted in 10 episodes.

== Bootcamp ==
This season, there will be four categories : Boys (14–24 years), Girls (14–24 years), Over 24s and the Groups.

Brenciu will mentor the Groups, Bănică the Girls, Carla's Dream the Boys and Matache will mentor the Over 24s.

Complete Teams

Color key
– Eliminated in Four-chair challenge
– Eliminated in Duels
– Finalist
– Wildcard

Category (mentor)	Top 40 acts				
Girls (Bănică)	Ioana Bulgaru	Doinița Ioniță	Mălina Ciarnău	Francesca Hojda	Špela Jezovšek
Girls (Bănică)	Francesca Tuzzolino	Ioana Cheche Arsintioaia	Isabela Pamparău	Bianca Moccia	Daria Cojocaru
Overs (Matache)	Bella Santiago	Cristina Vasopol	Raluca Răducanu	Cristian Sanda	Vincenzo Vollaro
Overs (Matache)	Simion Caragia	Maria Coman	Charles Driscoll	Raisa Bordea	Cătălina Adam
Boys (Carlas)	Cristian Moldovan	Alexandru Stremițeanu	Andrei Geamăn	Eduard Ungureanu	Zila Mike
Boys (Carlas)	Alexandru Țală	Cristian Porcari	Robert Hotin	Dragoș Bucătariu	Tudor Leon Mureşan
Groups (Brenciu)	Diamonds	Vox	Angels	Rodica & Cristi	Andreea & Bișu
Groups (Brenciu)	Stardust	MaindFac	Deja Vu	No Fingerprints	Rush

=== Four-chair challenge ===
This season, the categories will face the four-chair challenge. From the 40 acts competing, at the end of this round, only 16 acts will go further in the competition.

The four-chair challenge were broadcast from 2 November 2018 until 23 November 2018. This consisted in 4 episodes, one for each group.

Color key
– Contestant was immediately eliminated after performance without switch
– Contestant was switched out later in the competition and eventually eliminated
– Contestant was not switched out and made the final four of their own category

Contestants performances on the four-chair challenge
Episode	Category (mentor)	Act	Order	Song	Mentor's decision	Switched with
Episode 11 (2 November)	Girls (Bănică)	Ioana Cheche Arsintioaia	1	"Mercy on Me"	Put in Chair 1	Doinița Ioniță
Episode 11 (2 November)	Girls (Bănică)	Daria Cojocaru	2	"Believer"	Put in Chair 2	Bianca Moccia
Episode 11 (2 November)	Girls (Bănică)	Isabela Pamparău	3	"The Prayer"	Put in Chair 3	Francesca Tuzzolino
Episode 11 (2 November)	Girls (Bănică)	Mălina Ciarnău	4	"Killing Me Softly with His Song"	Put in Chair 4	—
Episode 11 (2 November)	Girls (Bănică)	Bianca Moccia	5	"If I Were a Boy"	Put in Chair 2	Špela Jezovšek
Episode 11 (2 November)	Girls (Bănică)	Špela Jezovšek	6	"Clown"	Put in Chair 2	Ioana Bulgaru
Episode 11 (2 November)	Girls (Bănică)	Francesca Tuzzolino	7	"Titanium"	Put in Chair 3	Francesca Hojda
Episode 11 (2 November)	Girls (Bănică)	Doinița Ioniță	8	"Suus"	Put in Chair 1	—
Episode 11 (2 November)	Girls (Bănică)	Francesca Hojda	9	"Not About Angels"	Put in Chair 3	—
Episode 11 (2 November)	Girls (Bănică)	Ioana Bulgaru	10	"It's Oh So Quiet"	Put in Chair 2	—
Episode 12 (9 November)	Overs (Matache)	Raisa Bordea	1	"Runnin' (Lose It All)"	Put in Chair 4	Cristian Sanda
Episode 12 (9 November)	Overs (Matache)	Simion Caragia	2	"Wicked Game"	Put in Chair 3	Bella Santiago
Episode 12 (9 November)	Overs (Matache)	Cristina Vasopol	3	"Calling You"	Put in Chair 2	—
Episode 12 (9 November)	Overs (Matache)	Charles Driscoll	4	"Shouldn't It Be Me"	Put in Chair 1	Vincenzo Vollaro
Episode 12 (9 November)	Overs (Matache)	Cătălina Adam	5	"Selfish Love"	Eliminated	—N/a
Episode 12 (9 November)	Overs (Matache)	Cristian Sanda	6	"When I Was Your Man"	Put in Chair 4	—
Episode 12 (9 November)	Overs (Matache)	Vincenzo Vollaro	7	"One Night Only"	Put in Chair 1	Raluca Răducanu
Episode 12 (9 November)	Overs (Matache)	Maria Coman	8	"Skyscraper"	Eliminated	—N/a
Episode 12 (9 November)	Overs (Matache)	Bella Santiago	9	"Rolling in the Deep"	Put in Chair 3	—
Episode 12 (9 November)	Overs (Matache)	Raluca Răducanu	10	"Billie Jean"	Put in Chair 1	—
Episode 13 (16 November)	Boys (Carla's)	Tudor Leon Mureşan	1	"She's on My Mind"	Eliminated	—N/a
Episode 13 (16 November)	Boys (Carla's)	Robert Hotin	2	"When We Were Young"	Put in Chair 1	Alexandru Stremițeanu
Episode 13 (16 November)	Boys (Carla's)	Cristian Porcari	3	"Shape of My Heart"	Put in Chair 2	Eduard Ungureanu
Episode 13 (16 November)	Boys (Carla's)	Andrei Geamăn	4	"Superstisition"	Put in Chair 3	—
Episode 13 (16 November)	Boys (Carla's)	Zila Mike	5	"Velociraptorul Dance"	Put in Chair 4	Cristian Moldovan
Episode 13 (16 November)	Boys (Carla's)	Dragoș Bucătariu	6	"Say Something"	Eliminated	—N/a
Episode 13 (16 November)	Boys (Carla's)	Alexandru Stremițeanu	7	"Skinny Love"	Put in Chair 1	—
Episode 13 (16 November)	Boys (Carla's)	Eduard Ungureanu	8	"Cry Baby"	Put in Chair 2	—
Episode 13 (16 November)	Boys (Carla's)	Alexandru Țală	9	"Gravity"	Eliminated	—N/a
Episode 13 (16 November)	Boys (Carla's)	Cristian Moldovan	10	"Human"	Put in Chair 4	—
Episode 14 (23 November)	Groups (Brenciu)	Deja Vu	1	"Back in Black"	Put in Chair 1	Stardust
Episode 14 (23 November)	Groups (Brenciu)	Rush	2	"(I've Had) The Time of My Life"	Eliminated	—N/a
Episode 14 (23 November)	Groups (Brenciu)	MaindFac	3	"X"	Put in Chair 2	Vox
Episode 14 (23 November)	Groups (Brenciu)	Rodica & Cristi	4	"Volcano"	Put in Chair 3	—
Episode 14 (23 November)	Groups (Brenciu)	No Fingerprints	5	"Dirty Diana"	Eliminated	—N/a
Episode 14 (23 November)	Groups (Brenciu)	Andreea & Bișu	6	"No Diggity"	Put in Chair 4	Diamonds
Episode 14 (23 November)	Groups (Brenciu)	Stardust	7	"Hello"	Put in Chair 1	Angels
Episode 14 (23 November)	Groups (Brenciu)	Vox	8	"(You Make Me Feel Like) A Natural Woman"	Put in Chair 2	—
Episode 14 (23 November)	Groups (Brenciu)	Angels	9	"Show Me How You Burlesque"	Put in Chair 1	—
Episode 14 (23 November)	Groups (Brenciu)	Diamonds	10	"Perdono"	Put in Chair 4	—

=== Duels ===
At the end of this round there were 8 acts remaining, two for each category. The duels were broadcast on 30 November 2018.

Colour key:

- Artist won the Duel and advanced to the Live shows

- Artist lost the Duel and was eliminated

Contestants performances on the duels challenge
Episode	Category (mentor)	Duel	Act	Order	Song	Result
Episode 15 (30 November)	Groups (Brenciu)	Duel 1	Rodica & Cristi	1	"Rise & Fall"/"Shape"	Eliminated
Episode 15 (30 November)	Groups (Brenciu)	Duel 1	Vox	2	"Runaway Baby"	Finalist
Episode 15 (30 November)	Girls (Bănică)	Duel 2	Mălina Ciarnău	3	"Give It to Me Right"	Eliminated
Episode 15 (30 November)	Girls (Bănică)	Duel 2	Doinița Ioniță	4	"All by Myself"	Finalist
Episode 15 (30 November)	Boys (Carlas)	Duel 3	Andrei Geamăn	5	"Be Alright"	Eliminated
Episode 15 (30 November)	Boys (Carlas)	Duel 3	Cristian Moldovan	6	"A Change Is Gonna Come"	Finalist
Episode 15 (30 November)	Overs (Matache)	Duel 4	Cristian Sanda	7	"Yesterday"	Eliminated
Episode 15 (30 November)	Overs (Matache)	Duel 4	Bella Santiago	8	"Total Eclipse of the Heart"	Finalist
Episode 15 (30 November)	Groups (Brenciu)	Duel 5	Diamonds	9	"Lady Marmalade"	Finalist
Episode 15 (30 November)	Groups (Brenciu)	Duel 5	Angels	10	"Feeling Good"	Eliminated
Episode 15 (30 November)	Boys (Carlas)	Duel 6	Alexandru Stremițeanu	11	"You Are the Reason"	Finalist
Episode 15 (30 November)	Boys (Carlas)	Duel 6	Eduard Ungureanu	12	"The House of the Rising Sun"	Eliminated
Episode 15 (30 November)	Girls (Bănică)	Duel 7	Francesca Hojda	13	"Best Part"	Eliminated
Episode 15 (30 November)	Girls (Bănică)	Duel 7	Ioana Bulgaru	14	"Dog Days Are Over"	Finalist
Episode 15 (30 November)	Overs (Matache)	Duel 8	Cristina Vasopol	15	"Stay with Me"	Finalist
Episode 15 (30 November)	Overs (Matache)	Duel 8	Raluca Răducanu	16	"Love on the Brain"	Eliminated

=== Wildcard ===
In this season, like season 7, the public will have the chance to save one of the acts that competed in the Auditions. The most voted act will go directly to the Live Shows. In the first live show if one of the mentor decides to take him in his team, then he will go further in the competition, otherwise he will be sent home.

The winner of this season selected by the public was Cristian Sanda, from the Overs Category.

== Finalists ==
The nine finalists will compete in the Live Shows.

Color Key
– Winner
– Runner-up
– Third place

Category (mentor)	Acts		
Boys (Carla's)	Cristian Moldovan	Alexandru Stremițeanu	
Girls (Bănică)	Ioana Bulgaru	Doinița Ioniță	
Over 24s (Matache)	Cristian Sanda	Bella Santiago	Cristina Vasopol
Groups (Brenciu)	Diamonds	Vox	

== Live shows ==
=== Results summary ===
Color key

–	Contestant was announced as the winner.
–	Contestant has returned in the competition.
–	Contestant received the most votes from the public.
–	Contestant received the fewest public votes and was immediately eliminated, no duel.

Live shows results per contestant
Contestant	Live Show 1		Live Show 2		Live Show 3	
Contestant	Wildcard	Elimination	Round 1	Round 2	Round 1	Round 2
Bella Santiago	—N/a	Safe	Safe	Safe	Safe	Winner
Ioana Bulgaru	—N/a	Safe	Safe	Safe	Safe	Runner-up
Cristian Moldovan	—N/a	Safe	Safe	Safe	3rd	Eliminated (Gala 3)
Doinița Ioniță	—N/a	Safe	Safe	Safe	4th	Eliminated (Gala 3)
Cristian Sanda	Returned Gala 1	Safe	Safe	5th	Eliminated (Gala 2)	
Cristina Vasopol	—N/a	Safe	Safe	6th	Eliminated (Gala 2)	
Vox	—N/a	Safe	7th	Eliminated (Gala 2)		
Alexandru Stremițeanu	—N/a	Safe	8th	Eliminated (Gala 2)		
Diamonds	—N/a	9th	Eliminated (Gala 1)			
Eliminated
Eliminated	None	Diamonds by public vote	Alexandru Stremițeanu by public vote	Cristina Vasopol by public vote	Doinița Ioniță by public vote	Ioana Bulgaru by public vote
Eliminated	None	Diamonds by public vote	Vox by public vote	Cristian Sanda by public vote	Cristian Moldovan by public vote	Bella Santiago by public vote
Reference(s)						

=== Live show details ===
==== Live Show 1 - 9 December 2018 ====
- Group Song : "Ani de liceu"
- Theme : Romanian Gala
- Interval Act : "Acadele", "Despablito" by Delia Matache

In this live show there were no duels, the act with lowest public votes was eliminated from the competition.

Contestants' performances on the first live show
Act	Order	Song	Result
Cristian Sanda	1	"Salcia"	Safe
Doinița Ioniță	2	"Jocul țambalelor"	Safe
Diamonds	3	"Inima mea"	Eliminated
Cristian Moldovan	4	"Eternitate"	Safe
Bella Santiago	5	"Cine iubeşte şi lasă"	Safe
Vox	6	"Dincolo de nori"	Safe
Alexandru Stremițeanu	7	"Nici o stea"	Safe
Ioana Bulgaru	8	"Tudore"	Safe
Cristina Vasopol	9	"Ciocârlia"	Safe

==== Live Show 2: Semifinal - 16 December 2018 ====
- Group Song : "Din toată inima"
- Theme : Semifinal Gala
- Interval Act : "Ce-ar fi", "Sunt cine vreau să fiu" by Horia Brenciu; "Alerg" by Alexandra Crișan

In this live show there were two rounds, after each round, the two acts with the lowest public votes were eliminated from the competition.

Contestants' performances on the second live show
Act	Order	Song	Result
Round 1
Ioana Bulgaru	1	"Toy"	Safe
Cristian Sanda	2	"Jealous"	Safe
Alexandru Stremițeanu	3	"O stea"	Eliminated
Bella Santiago	4	"It's All Coming Back to Me Now"	Safe
Doinița Ioniță	5	"De-ar fi să vii"	Safe
Vox	6	"Focul"	Eliminated
Cristina Vasopol	7	"Queen"/ "I'm Every Woman"	Safe
Cristian Moldovan	8	"Always"	Safe
Round 2
Ioana Bulgaru	1	"Țărăncută, țărăncuță"	Safe
Cristian Sanda	2	"Cerul"	Eliminated
Bella Santiago	3	"Hora din Moldova"	Safe
Doinița Ioniță	4	"Stone Cold"	Safe
Cristina Vasopol	5	"Au înnebunit salcâmii"	Eliminated
Cristian Moldovan	6	"Ploaia"	Safe

==== Live Show 3: Final - 23 December 2018 ====
===== Round 1 =====
- Theme: Duet with special guest and with their mentor
- Interval Act : ""

Contestants' performances on the third live show
Act	Order	First Song (duet with special guest)	Order	Second Song (duet with mentor)	Result
	1		8		
	2		5		
	3		7		
	4		6		

===== Round 2 =====
- Theme: Final
- Interval Act: "Luna", "Ca benzina" by Carla's Dreams

Contestants' performances on the final live show
Act	Order	Song	Result
Ioana Bulgaru	1		Runner-up
Bella Santiago	2		Winner

== Ratings ==
Ep	Title	Date	National		Urban		18-49		Source
Ep	Title	Date	Average (thousands)	Rating (%)	Average (thousands)	Rating (%)	Average (thousands)	Rating (%)	Source
1	Auditions 1	26 August 2018	901	5.0	529	5.5	232	5.3	
2	Auditions 2	2 September 2018	701	3.9	386	4.0	177	4.0	
3	Auditions 3	11 September 2018	831	4.6	444	4.6	213	4.8	
4	Auditions 4	18 September 2018	824	4.6	491	5.1	246	5.6	
5	Auditions 5	25 September 2018	1 035	5.8	587	6.1	264	6.0	
6	Auditions 6	2 October 2018	Unknown						
7	Auditions 7	9 October 2018	994	5.5	603	6.3	291	6.6	
8	Auditions 8	16 October 2018	749	4.2	385	4.0	153	3.5	
9	Auditions 9	23 October 2018	910	5.1	552	5.7	239	5.4	
10	Auditions 10	26 October 2018	695	3.9	367	3.8	156	3.5	
11	Bootcamp - Four-chair Challenge 1	2 November 2018	678	3.8	362	3.8	181	4.1	
12	Bootcamp - Four-chair Challenge 2	9 November 2018	644	3.4	329	3.4	130	2.9	
13	Bootcamp - Four-chair Challenge 3	16 November 2018	688	3.8	386	4.0	177	4.0	
14	Bootcamp - Four-chair Challenge 4	23 November 2018	660	3.7	349	3.6	157	3.6	
15	Bootcamp - The Duels	30 November 2018	843	4.7	463	4.8	202	4.6	
16	Live Show 1	9 December 2018	589	3.3	311	3.2	138	3.1	
17	Live Show 2 - Semifinal	16 December 2018							
18	Live Show 3 - Final	23 December 2018							
