= Crybaby =

Crybaby, Cry-Baby, CryBaby or Cry Baby may refer to:

== Music ==
=== Albums ===
- Cry Baby (Garnet Mimms album), 1963
- Cry Baby (Melanie Martinez album), 2015
- Cry Baby (Vince Staples album), 2026
- The Crybaby, an album by the American rock band Melvins, 2000
- Crybaby (Lil Peep mixtape), 2016
- Crybaby (Tegan and Sara album), 2022

=== Songs ===
- "Cry Baby" (Garnet Mimms song), 1963, also recorded by Janis Joplin in 1970
- "Cry Baby" (Jemini song), 2003
- "Cry Baby" (Cee Lo Green song), 2010
- "Cry Baby" (Megan Thee Stallion song), 2020
- "Cry Baby" (Melanie Martinez song), 2015
- "Cry Baby" (Official Hige Dandism song), 2021
- "Cry Baby" (Clean Bandit, Anne-Marie and David Guetta song), 2024
- "Crybaby" (Mariah Carey song), 2000
- "Crybaby" (Paloma Faith song), 2017
- "Crybaby" (SZA song), 2024
- "Cry Baby", by the Bonnie Sisters, 1956
- "Cry Baby", by Cheap Trick from Woke Up with a Monster, 1994
- "Cry Baby", by Demi Lovato from Tell Me You Love Me, 2017
- "Cry Baby", by Kix from Midnite Dynamite, 1985
- "Cry Baby", by Lizzo from Cuz I Love You, 2019
- "Cry Baby", by MacKenzie Porter, 2019
- "Cry Baby", by Meghan Trainor from Toy with Me, 2026
- "Cry Baby", by the Neighbourhood from Wiped Out!, 2015
- "Cry Baby", by Reks from Grey Hairs, 2008
- "Cry Baby", by Stray Cats from Choo Choo Hot Fish, 1992
- "Crybaby", by Cults from To the Ghosts, 2024
- "Crybaby", by Utopia from Oblivion, 1984

== Other uses ==
- Cry-Baby, a 1990 film by John Waters
- Cry-Baby (musical), a 2007 musical adaptation of the 1990 film
- Cry Baby, the protagonist of Melanie Martinez's film K-12
- "Crybaby!", a 2010 episode of the web series Battle for Dream Island
- Cry Baby (gum), a brand of sour bubble gum
- Dunlop Cry Baby, a wah-wah effects guitar pedal

== See also ==
- Cry Baby Cry (disambiguation)
