= Cry Baby (Garnet Mimms album) =

Studio album LP by Garnet Mimms
- Released: 1963
- Genre: R&B, Soul
- Label: United Artists
- Producer: Jerry Ragovoy

Cry Baby is a 1963 album by Garnet Mimms featuring "Cry Baby" and 11 other hits produced by Jerry Ragovoy. The album is notable for featuring a hit recording with the Enchanters, "A Quiet Place", which became a popular song among the Carolina beach music community. "Quiet Place" was also adapted with enduring appeal by many Reggae artists, including John Holt,The Paragons, Horace Andy, Doctor Alimantado and Dennis Brown. The reggae versions were released under a number of different titles, the most well-known being "Man Next Door".

== Track listing ==
=== Side 1 ===
1. Cry Baby (Bert Berns, Jerry Ragovoy)
2. Nobody but You (Dee Clark)
3. Until You Were Gone (Joy Byers)
4. Anytime You Want Me (Garnet Mimms, Norman Meade)
5. So Close (Jerry Ragovoy, Sam Bell)
6. For Your Precious Love (Arthur Brooks, Richard Brooks, Jerry Butler)

=== Side 2 ===
1. Baby Don't You Weep (Norman Meade, Bert Russell)
2. A Quiet Place (Norman Meade, Sam Bell)
3. Cry to Me (Bert Russell)
4. Don't Change Your Heart (Sam Bell)
5. Wanting You (Buddy Kaye, Philip Springer)
6. The Truth Hurts (Jimmy Radcliffe, Ora Mae Diamond)

== Personnel ==
- Garnet Mimms - lead vocals
- Zola Pearnell - backing vocals (side 1, track 5; side 2, tracks 2 and 4)
- Sam Bell - backing vocals (side 1, track 5; side 2, tracks 2 and 4)
- Charles Boyer - backing vocals (side 1, track 5; side 2, tracks 2 and 4)
- The Gospelaires (various combinations of Dionne Warwick, Dee Dee Warwick, Estelle Brown, Sylvia Shemwell, Cissy Houston, and others) - backing vocals (all other tracks)
