= Bella Santiago =

- Also known as: Resciebelle Santiago
- Born: Resciebelle Barrios Santiago; 1 December 1989 (age 36); Dasmariñas, Cavite, Philippines
- Origin: Bucharest, Romania
- Genres: Pop
- Occupation: Singer
- Instrument: Vocals
- Years active: 2016–present
- Label: Cat Music

Resciebelle "Bella" Barrios Santiago (born 1 December 1989) is a Filipino-Romanian singer. Santiago first gained notice in Romania in 2016, after becoming a finalist on season six of Românii au talent, Romania's version of Got Talent. She later attracted widespread attention by winning season eight of X Factor Romania in 2018.

Santiago has tried to represent Romania in the Eurovision Song Contest twice. She finished fourth in Selecția Națională 2018 with the song "Auzi cum bate", a collaboration with Romanian band Jukebox, and competed in Selecția Națională 2019 as a solo artist with the song "Army of Love", finishing third.

She will compete again at Selecția Națională 2026 with the song "Romania Queen" in her third attempt.

== Early life ==
Santiago was born in Dasmariñas, Cavite, Philippines, and started singing at age 12. She was raised by her grandmother after her father died when she was just a year old, and her mother left the Philippines to earn money for the family. At 15, she began performing at local bars in Manila and later participated in the Filipino televised singing competitions Pinoy Pop Superstar and Tawag ng Tanghalan. Before moving to Romania, Santiago had worked in Malaysia and Taiwan.

== Career ==
=== 2016–present: Românii au talent, X Factor, and breakthrough ===
In 2016, Santiago auditioned for season six of Românii au talent. She ultimately reached the finals of the competition, but lost to Laura Bretan. After the competition, she was signed to Romanian record label Cat Music. Her debut single "Unpredictable" was released the following year, produced by a Romanian singer and producer Smiley. In 2017, she began collaborating with Romanian band Jukebox. Together, they released three singles:: "Vocea ta", "Auzi cum bate", and "Sugar Gumalaw". "Auzi cum bate" was later selected to compete in Selecția Națională 2018, the Romanian national final for the Eurovision Song Contest 2018. Santiago and Jukebox advanced from the second semi-final held in Timișoara, and later competed in the final held in Bucharest on 25 February 2018. They ultimately placed fourth.

Later in 2018, Santiago auditioned for season eight of X Factor Romania. She advanced past her initial audition and was mentored by Romanian singer Delia Matache during the course of the show. Santiago ultimately was crowned the winner of the competition on 23 December 2018. In January 2019, Romanian singer Dan Bittman announced his withdrawal from Selecția Națională 2019 due to scheduling conflicts, and the Romanian broadcaster Romanian Television (TVR) announced that two wildcard entries would replace him in the competition. A week later, Santiago was announced as one of the two wildcards with the song "Army of Love". Santiago competed in the first semi-final on 27 January 2019 and advanced to the final after winning the jury vote. She competed in the final on 17 February 2019, and placed third behind Ester Peony.

Santiago competed in the 14th season of Te cunosc de undeva! (translation: I know you from somewhere!), the Romanian version of the talent show, Your Face Sounds Familiar. She won the season, gaining 87 points in the finale.

== Personal life ==
Santiago moved to Bucharest in 2016, in order to be with her Romanian boyfriend Nicolae Ionuț Grigorie. They had previously met while both were living in Malaysia. Santiago and Grigorie married in December 2018. Santiago has one daughter from a previous relationship; neither she nor her daughter is in contact with the father.

== Discography ==
Title	Year	Album
"Unpredictable"	2017	Non-album singles
"Vocea ta" (with Jukebox)	2018	Non-album singles
"Auzi cum bate" (with Jukebox)	2018	Non-album singles
"Sugar Gumalaw" (with Jukebox)	2018	Non-album singles
"Army of Love"	2019	Non-album singles
