= Lorraine Ellison =

American singer-songwriter

Background information
- Born: Marybelle Luraine Ellison; March 17, 1931; Philadelphia, United States
- Died: January 31, 1983 (aged 51)
- Genres: Soul, R&B
- Occupations: Singer, songwriter
- Instrument: Vocals
- Years active: 1964–1976
- Labels: Mercury Records; Warner Bros. Records; Loma Records

Lorraine Ellison (March 17, 1931 – January 31, 1983) was an American soul singer and songwriter known for her recording of the song "Stay with Me" (sometimes known as "Stay With Me Baby") in 1966.

== Life and career ==
Born Marybelle Luraine Ellison, in Philadelphia, Pennsylvania, to a musical family, Ellison sang in churches from the age of six and attended the John Bartram High School.

She originally sang gospel music, working in the groups the Ellison Singers and the Golden Chords in the early 1960s. In 1963, Ellison appeared with the Golden Chords on the Introducing The Sweet Chariot The Sensational New Pop Gospel Night Club With Soul Recorded Live album, leading "Wake Me, Shake Me". Ellison also appeared at the Festival of the Two Worlds in Spoleto, Italy.

She switched to the R&B genre in 1964 and her first release was a chart entry, "I Dig You Baby" in 1965, on Mercury Records, which reached number 22 on the US Billboard R&B chart. Initially a slow seller, five months after its release, its reported national sales were 40,000. After another unsuccessful single, she signed with Warner Bros. Records, and in 1966 recorded "Stay with Me" at a last-minute booking, following a studio cancellation by Frank Sinatra."Stay with Me" reached number 11 in the U.S. Billboard R&B chart and number 64 in the U.S. Billboard Hot 100 chart. The song was produced and written by Jerry Ragovoy. Some of her later single releases were on Warner's subsidiary soul music record label, Loma Records. "Stay with Me" would become her signature song. Her follow-up single was "Heart Be Still" a minor hit in 1967. Ellison also recorded "Try (Just a Little Bit Harder)", a song later covered to more success by Janis Joplin. Peter Jones of Record Mirror rated Ellison's "Try (Just a Little Bit Harder)" 4/5 stars, writing, 'Soul-filled ballad here, intense vocals from Lorraine and the femme vocal group. Intense but same-y'. In May 1967, Ellison was due to tour the UK and Ireland, but cancelled due to illness.

Ellison composed some of her own songs (by herself and with manager and later husband, Sam Bell, who was lead singer of soul vocal group, The Enchanters. Her compositions were recorded by several other artists, including Jerry Butler, Garnet Mimms, Howard Tate and Dee Dee Warwick. After leaving Warner, she recorded at least two unissued tracks for the then fast-growing Philadelphia International label in her hometown.

Twice-married and using the surname Gonzalez-Keys, Lorraine Ellison gave up the music business to take care of her mother, but continued to sing in church. Ellison died in January 1983 from ovarian cancer at the age of 51.

== Discography ==
=== Studio albums ===
List of albums, with selected details
Title	Album details
Heart & Soul	Released: 1966; Label: Warner Bros. Records; Format: LP, CD
Stay with Me	Released: 1969; Label: Warner Bros. Records; Format: LP, CD
Lorraine Ellison	Released: 1974; Label: Warner Bros. Records; Format: LP

=== Compilation albums ===
List of albums, with selected details
Title	Album details
The Best of Philadelphia's Queen	Released: 1976; Label: Warner Bros. Records; Format: CD
Stay with Me: The Best of Lorraine Ellison	Released: 1995; Label: Ichiban Records; Format: CD
Sister Love: The Warner Bros. Recordings	Released: 2006; Label: Rhino Handmade; Format: CD, digital download

=== Singles ===
List of singles as a band member, with selected chart positions, sales figures and certifications
Title	Year	Artist	Album
"Open Up Your Heart"	1963	Lorraine Ellison and the Ellison Singers	Non-album single

List of singles as a lead artist, with selected chart positions, sales figures and certifications
Title	Year	Chart positions								Album
Title	Year	US	US R&B /HH	US Cash Box	US R&B Cash Box	US R&B Record World	CAN	UK	UK R&B	Album
"I Dig You Baby"	1965	103	22	116	25	32	—	—	—	Non-album single
"Call Me Anytime You Need Some Lovin'"	1966	—	—	—	—	—	—	—	—	Non-album single
"Stay with Me"	1966	64	11	66	16	9	58	56	6	Heart & Soul
"A Good Love"	1966	131	—	122	33	—	—	—	—	Stay with Me
"If I Had a Hammer"	1967	—	—	144	—	—	—	—	—	Heart & Soul
"No Matter How It All Turns Out"	1967	—	—	—	—	—	—	—	—	Stay with Me
"Heart Be Still"	1967	89	43	106	29	36	—	—	—	Stay with Me
"I Want To Be Loved"	1967	—	—	137	—	—	—	—	—	Stay with Me
"Try (Just A Little Bit Harder)"	1968	—	—	—	—	—	—	—	—	Stay with Me
"Only Your Love"	1969	—	—	—	—	—	—	—	—	Stay with Me
"Stay with Me" (Note: US and Germany re-issue.)	1970	—	—	—	—	—	—	—	—	Stay with Me
"You've Really Got A Hold On Me"	1970	—	—	—	—	—	—	—	—	Lorraine Ellison
"Many Rivers to Cross"	1973	—	—	—	—	—	—	—	—	Lorraine Ellison
"—" denotes releases that did not chart or were not released.

- Notes
