= I'll Take Good Care of You =

"I'll Take Good Care Of You"

Single by Garnet Mimms
- B-side: "Prove It to Me"
- Released: 1966
- Recorded: 1966
- Genre: Northern soul
- Length: 3:19
- Label: United Artists
- Songwriters: Bert Berns and Jerry Ragovoy
- Producers: Jerry Ragovoy and Bert Berns

Garnet Mimms singles chronology
"That Goes to Show You" (1965)	"I'll Take Good Care Of You" (1966)	"It's Been Such a Long Way Home" (1966)

"I'll Take Good Care of You", written by Bert Berns (a.k.a. Bert Russell) and Jerry Ragovoy, is a song recorded by Garnet Mimms for United Artists in 1966. Though more obscure than the Berns/Ragovoy/Mimms song "Cry Baby", "I'll Take Good Care Of You" is another in their joint body of work.

== Song information ==
The song was released in early 1966. It is in the key of G major with a tempo of 48 beats per minute. It peaked at number 30 on the Billboard Hot 100 in May 1966 and charted for 9 weeks.

== Covers ==
A cover version of the song was released in 1967 by Cliff Bennett and the Rebel Rousers.
