= Samantha Rose =

Jamaican singer (born 1954)

- Born: 1954 (age 71–72)
- Origin: Jamaica
- Genres: Reggae, lovers rock
- Occupation: Singer
- Years active: 1975–1991
- Labels: Saturn, Empire, World International, Germain

Samantha Rose (born 1954 in Jamaica) was a lovers rock reggae singer, who was active from the mid-1970s to the beginning of the 1990s. She recorded in London for producers that included Winston Curtis and Les Cliff and is perhaps best known for her interpretation of Marlena Shaw's version of the much covered "Go Away Little Boy" and for her cover of "Angel of the Morning". Other successes included her duet with Les Cliff "Together in Love", and with Ray Mondo on "Easy Lovin'".

== Biography ==
Samantha Rose was born in Jamaica in 1954 and began singing in public at the age of 12. In 1969, she moved to live in London and made her recording debut for reggae music producer Les Cliff at the age of 21 in 1975. The song "Your Tender Lips", written by Les Cliff and Samantha Rose and released on Dennis Harris' D.I.P label, was an early example of lovers rock, a romantic ballad form of reggae that found favour among West Indians living in the United Kingdom.

In 1976–77, she released a number of singles for Les Cliff's own label Saturn. This included "Undying Love", "How I Need You", "My Only Chance" and "Could This Be Love". They sold well enough for her in 1978 to begin recording the LP Samantha Rose in Person, produced by Winston Curtis and released in 1979 on the Empire label. It included new versions of "Angel of the Morning" and "Your Tender Lips" with a number of original songs and covers of popular soul songs that included "Kiss You All Over". She consolidated the success with a further album, Tell Me Why that consisted of similar material produced as previously by Curtis. Her version of "Stay with Me Baby", originally a hit for Lorraine Ellison, proved very popular.

A further album produced by Count Shelley and Fitzroy Sterling appeared in 1982. It included her version of "Go Away Little Boy" that was also issued as a 12" single. Subsequently, Rose failed to find a substantial audience beyond the lovers rock scene and by the late 1980s she had relocated to Miami to work with the burgeoning West Indian music scene. She appeared at the Reggae Sunburst festivals in Miami in 1989 and 1991. Since then, she has recorded sporadically in Jamaica and England. In 2003, Winston Curtis released a collection of her most popular songs from the late '70s and early '80s reviving interest in her career.

== Discography ==
=== Albums and compilations ===
- 1979: Samantha Rose in Person (Empire Records UK)
- 1981: Tell Me Why (Body Music/Live and Love UK)
- 1982: Together in Love (World International UK)
- 2003: A Rose for a Rose (compilation of 1970s/80s material) (Jetstar)
