= Hip Young Guitar Slinger =

Compilation album
- Released: 4 September 2000
- Label: Sequel NEECD486

Hip Young Guitar Slinger is a compilation album of Jimmy Page's pre-Led Zeppelin studio sessions, recorded between 1962 and 1966. It was released on 4 September 2000.

== Background ==
It is not certain whether Page actually played on every track. For instance, the history section of the Lancastrians' official website specifically states that he did not play on "We'll Sing in the Sunshine" – although he did play on the B-side, "Was She Tall".

Likewise, officially Page has been credited with playing acoustic twelve string guitar on two tracks on The Kinks' debut album, specifically on "I'm a Lover Not a Fighter" and "I've Been Driving On Bald Mountain", and possibly on the B-side "I Gotta Move", but not on "Bald Headed Woman" or "Revenge". Page appeared on the album Kinky Music by the "Larry Page Orchestra" on which the track "Revenge" was covered Larry Page, being the Kinks' then manager and co-writer of "Revenge".

Many tracks of this collection (on disc 2) are from the 1968/69 Blues Anytime series.

== Track listing ==
=== Disc 1 ===
1. Carter-Lewis and the Southerners – "Who Told You?" (Barry White, Geoffrey Goddard)
2. Gregory Phillips – "Angie" (Jean Slater, Tom Springfield)
3. Gregory Phillips – "Please Believe Me" (Johnny Beveridge, Peter Oakman)
4. Carter-Lewis and the Southerners – "Somebody Told My Girl" (John Carter, Ken Lewis)
5. Carter-Lewis and the Southerners – "Skinny Minnie" (Arrett "Rusty" Keefer, Bill Haley, Catherine Cafra, Milton Gabler)
6. Wayne Gibson and Dynamic Sounds – "Kelly" (Del Shannon, Maron McKenzie)
7. Wayne Gibson and Dynamic Sounds – "See You Later, Alligator" (Robert Guidry)
8. The Kinks – "Revenge" (Larry Page, Ray Davies)
9. The Kinks – "Bald Headed Woman" (Traditional)
10. The First Gear – "A Certain Girl" (Naomi Neville)
11. The First Gear – "Leave My Kitten Alone" (James McDougal, Little Willie John, Titus Turner)
12. The Primitives – "Help Me" (Ralph Bass, Willie Dixon)
13. The Primitives – "Let Them Talk" (Jeffrey Farthing, John E. Soul)
14. The Lancastrians – "We'll Sing in the Sunshine" (Gale Garnett)
15. The Lancastrians – "Was She Tall" (Barry Langtree)
16. The Primitives – "You Said" (Geoff Tindell)
17. The Primitives – "How Do You Feel" (John E. Soul)
18. The First Gear – "The ‘In’ Crowd" (Jimmy Page)
19. The First Gear – "Gotta Make Their Future Bright" (Michael Purchell, Shel Talmy)
20. The Fifth Avenue – "The Bells of Rhymney" (Idris Davies, Pete Seeger)
21. The Fifth Avenue – "Just Like Anyone Would Do" (Jimmy Page)
22. Nico – "I'm Not Sayin'" (Gordon Lightfoot)
23. Nico – "The Last Mile" (Andrew Loog Oldham, Jimmy Page)
24. Gregory Phillips – "Down in the Boondocks" (Joe South)
25. Gregory Phillips – "That's the One" (Andrew Loog Oldham, Jimmy Page)
26. The Masterminds – "She Belongs to Me" (Bob Dylan)
27. The Masterminds – "Taken My Love" (Doug Meakin, George Cassidy)

=== Disc 2 ===
1. John Mayall's Bluesbreakers – "I'm Your Witchdoctor" (John Mayall)
2. John Mayall's Bluesbreakers – "Telephone Blues" (John Mayall)
3. John Mayall and The Bluesbreakers With Eric Clapton – "On Top of the World" (John Mayall)
4. Les Fleur de Lys – "Moondreams" (Norman Petty)
5. Les Fleur de Lys – "Wait for Me" (Jimmy Page)
6. The Lancastrians – "The World Keeps Going Round" (Ray Davies)
7. The Lancastrians – "Not the Same Anymore" (Kevin Heywood)
8. The Factotums – "Can't Go Home Anymore My Love" (Denver Gerrard)
9. Les Fleur de Lys – "Circles" (Pete Townshend)
10. Les Fleur de Lys – "So, Come On" (Frank Smith, Phil Sawyer)
11. Twice as Much – "Sittin' on a Fence" (Mick Jagger, Keith Richards)
12. Twice as Much – "Step Out of Line" (Andrew Rose, David Skinner)
13. Chris Farlowe – "Moanin'" (Bobby Timmons, Jon Hendricks)
14. Eric Clapton and Jimmy Page – "Choker" (Eric Clapton, Jimmy Page)
15. Eric Clapton and Jimmy Page – "Freight Loader" (Eric Clapton, Jimmy Page)
16. Eric Clapton and Jimmy Page – "Miles Road" (Eric Clapton, Jimmy Page)
17. Eric Clapton and Jimmy Page – "Draggin' My Tail" (Eric Clapton, Jimmy Page)
18. All Stars Featuring Jimmy Page – "L.A. Breakdown" (Jimmy Page)
19. All Stars Featuring Jimmy Page – "Down in the Boots" (Jimmy Page)
20. Eric Clapton – "Snake Drive" (Eric Clapton, Jimmy Page)
21. Eric Clapton – "West Coast Idea" (Eric Clapton, Jimmy Page)
22. Eric Clapton – "Tribute to Elmore" (Eric Clapton, Jimmy Page)
23. The All Stars with Jeff Beck – "Chuckles" (Jimmy Page)
24. The All Stars with Jeff Beck – "Steelin'" (Jimmy Page)
25. The All Stars with Nicky Hopkins – "Piano Shuffle" (Jimmy Page)
26. Cyril Davies and The All Stars – "Not Fade Away" (Charles Hardin, Norman Petty)
