= Verde împărat =

Single by Delia

from the album 7
- Released: 23 October 2017
- Genre: Liquid dubstep; chillout
- Length: 3:35
- Label: Cat Music
- Songwriter: Delia Matache
- Producers: Matache; Alex Cotoi

Delia singles chronology
"Inadaptat" (2017)	"Verde împărat" (2017)	"Fata lu' tata" (2017)

"Verde împărat" (Romanian: Green Emperor) is a song recorded by Romanian singer Delia. It was digitally released on 23 October 2017 through Cat Music as a single from her fifth studio album 7 (2020). The track was written and composed by the singer herself, along with additional production from Alex Cotoi. "Verde împărat" is a liquid dubstep and chillout song, with instrumentation from flute, bass and percussion. Its lyrics revolve around Delia's relationship with her partner, whom she compares to a "green emperor", along with various nature references.

The song was met with positive reviews from music critics, who thought that it expanded her artistry and praised her vocal performance. An accompanying music video for the track was shot by Alex Ceauşu in early October 2017, and uploaded onto Cat Music's official YouTube channel simultaneously with the single's release. The clip received similar acclaim for its showcase of nature and wilderness. It portrays the singer in a forest, wearing multiple nature-inspired outfits. For further promotion, Delia performed "Verde împărat" for Romanian radio station Radio ZU and during her 2017 concert tour Psihedelia at Sala Palatului.

== Background and composition ==
"Verde împărat"
A 22–second sample of "Verde împărat", a Romanian language liquid dubstep and chillout song with various nature-inspired lyrics.

The song was penned by Delia, while production was handled by her along with Alex Cotoi. In an interview, she stated that a number of her material was written as therapy, including "Verde împărat" and her 2016 single "Cine m-a făcut om mare" ("Who Made Me Big"). It was premiered by Delia in March 2017 during a stripped-down performance for Romanian radio station Radio ZU, where she played the flute and piano. She also sang "Verde împărat" during her three–day concert tour Psihedelia at Sala Palatului in Bucharest, Romania, on a piano covered with moss followed by its digital release on 23 October 2017 by Cat Music.

"Verde împărat" is a Romanian language liquid dubstep and chillout song, acting as a departure from the singer's past pop and dance material. Its "smooth and slow" instrumentation consists of "endearing" flute accords, bass, "discreet" percussion and "archaic" sounds. Lyrically, "Verde împărat" deals with Delia's relationship with her love interest, which she compares to a "green emperor", along with various nature references.

== Critical reception ==
"Verde împărat" received universal acclaim from music critics. Alex Stănescu from InfoMusic called the song unique and praised Delia's vocal performance, while Alexandra Cheroiu, writing for Adevărul, positively saw it as different from her past work. In a review of Delia's live performance on Radio ZU, Raluca Chirilă of InfoMusic thought that the track "gives fans the opportunity to see [the singer] in a new hypostasis, musician, and not just pop singer."

== Music video ==
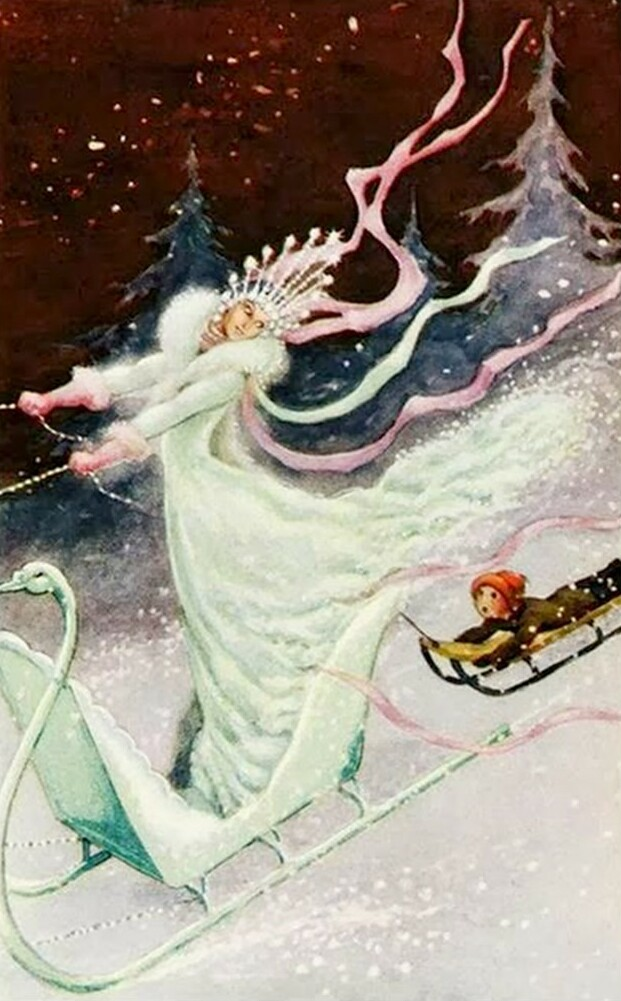
Delia wears multiple nature-inspired outfits and references fairy tales, including the Snow Queen (pictured).

An accompanying music video for "Verde împărat" was shot by Alex Ceauşu in early October 2017 — with whom Delia had collaborated in the past for her visuals for the 2016 and 2017 singles "1234 (Unde dragoste nu e)" ("1234 (Where There Is No Love)") and "Rămâi cu bine" ("Fare You Well") — while post-production was handled by Cristi Smarandoiu and Cristian Bălan. It was uploaded onto Cat Music's official YouTube channel on 23 October 2017. The clip references Romanian fairy tales and features various shots of Delia wearing nature-inspired outfits, a multicolored wig and dressed like the Snow Queen in a "charmed" forest. Make-up, hair and styling were done by Diana Ionescu, Livia Berceanu and Hilke Muslim, respectively.

Critics gave positive reviews of the music video. InfoMusic's Stănescu wrote: "Delia takes us into wild and cruel, pure and green nature in the heart of a magnificent universe [...]." He also called the clip "psychedelic", while associating its approach with Delia's concert tour Psihedelia. Cheroiu, writing for Adevărul, similarly praised the music video: "An atmosphere of fairy tales, a Chameleon Delia, fascinating costumes and makeup [....]," while Bianca Dragomir thought that Delia "has overcome new barriers". An editor of Pro FM associated the singer's appearance with a pink and rainbow hair trend.

== Track listing ==
- Digital download
1. "Verde împărat" – 3:35

== Release history ==
Territory	Date	Format(s)	Label
Worldwide	23 October 2017	Digital download	Cat Music
