= Acadele =

Single by Delia

from the album 7
- Language: Romanian
- Released: 5 November 2018
- Genre: Trap
- Length: 2:43
- Label: Cat
- Songwriter(s): Delia Matache; Alex Cotoi
- Producer(s): Cotoi

Delia singles chronology
"Despablito" (2018)	"Acadele" (2018)	"Trăiește frumos" (2018)

"Acadele" (Romanian: Lollipops) is a song recorded by Romanian singer Delia, and digitally released on 5 November 2018 through Cat Music as a single from her fifth studio album 7 (2020). Alex Cotoi produced the song and co-wrote it with Delia. "Acadele" is a trap song, which is a departure from Delia's previous pop works. In its candy-themed lyrics, she discusses female empowerment and references the LGBT community in Romania. She also alludes to the 2018 Romanian constitutional referendum regarding the constitutional definition of a family.

An accompanying music video for "Acadele" was uploaded onto Delia's official YouTube channel on 4 November 2018, and was directed by Alex Ceaușu. Several scenes of the clip feature candy; several kilograms of multiple sugar-based confectionery were used for the video shooting, including M&M's and marshmallows. In one scene, Delia wears a multicolored anorak reading "Love sees no colour", a reference to the lyrics' LGBT message. She performed "Acadele" live in several venues, including on the eighth season of X Factor Romania and for the Romanian radio station Radio ZU.

== Background and composition ==
"Acadele" was written by Delia and Alex Cotoi, while production was handled by Cotoi. It was made available for digital download on 5 November 2018 by Cat Music. Musically, "Acadele" is a trap song and is a departure from Delia's previous pop music. Its lyrics contain several subtexts and connotations, with the singer saying: "Many people have read behind the lines and each understood the text differently, [...] it has some accents you either catch or not. Or you're just thinking about sugar." Apart from the track's candy theme, the song discusses women's predisposition to diets and features a female empowerment message towards "voluptuous women with attitude".

Known as a supporter of LGBT rights, Delia references the controversy around the LGBT community in Romania by repeating "Boicot, boicot" ("boycott, boycott") throughout "Acadele". She further alludes to the 2018 Romanian constitutional referendum regarding the constitutional definition of marriage in the line: "În dulcele stil clasic și deloc tradițional/Noi n-o ardem în plastic, noi facem totul natural" ("In the sweets, classic style and not at all traditional/We don't [do it] in plastic, we do everything natural").

== Music video and promotion ==
In the video, Delia wears a multicolored sequined anorak which reads "Love sees no colour", as a reference to the song's LGBT message.

An accompanying music video for "Acadele" was uploaded onto Delia's YouTube channel on 4 November 2018. Alex Ceaușu acted as its director and director of photography, while Luca-s Art Film and Radu Selaru were hired as its producers. Upon its release, the clip was trending on YouTube in Romania, and a Facebook filter was also launched, allowing users to "recreate [its] atmosphere".

Nearly every scene of the music video displays candy; apart from some stage props, 500 kg of sugar were used for the clip alongside 10 kg of M&M's, 15 kg of marshmallows, 20 kg of candy, 30 kg of cake, 100 cupcakes and 150 lollipops. Delia recalls, "All [candies] were real and bought in industrial quantities [...]. I have not touched anything, I have only eaten some jellies." During the video, she performs choreography with background dancers, while wearing yellow sneakers, tied hair and a multicolored sequined anorak which reads "Love sees no colour", alluding to the lyrics' LGBT message. She is also shown residing in a pool created out of sugar filled with multicolored balls. Interspersed shots show backup dancers and Delia eating candy, as well as a flashing sign reading "Girls".

An editor of Spynews praised Delia's appearance in the video and the dancing as "sexy", allowing the viewer to "develop a rich imagination". For further promotion of "Acadele", Delia performed it live several times. She sang the track on 5 November for Romanian radio station Radio ZU, as well as on 6 November 2018 on Romanian talk show Prietenii de la 11. Delia named her concert tour "Acadelia" after "Acadele"; during the song's performance, several dancers emerged from a giant cake. On 9 December 2018, the singer—as a juror—appeared on the first live show of the eighth season of X Factor Romania to sing "Acadele". In September 2019, Grigore Gherman covered the song and impersonated Delia on Te cunosc de undeva!.

== Track listing ==
- Digital download
1. "Acadele" – 2:43

== Release history ==
Territory	Date	Format(s)	Label
Worldwide	5 November 2018	Digital download	Cat
