= Cry Baby Cry (disambiguation) =

"Cry Baby Cry" is a 1968 song by the Beatles.

Cry Baby Cry may also refer to:

- "Cry Baby Cry" (Duran Duran song), 2007
- "Cry Baby Cry" (Santana song), 2005
- "Cry, Baby, Cry", 1937, music and lyrics by Terry Shand and Jimmy Eaton, performed by Larry Clinton and his orchestra
- "Cry Baby Cry", 1982 single by Brotherhood of Man, featured on their album Lightning Flash

== See also ==
- Cry Baby (disambiguation)
