= Stay with Me (Lorraine Ellison song) =

Single by Lorraine Ellison

from the album Heart & Soul
- B-side: "I Got My Baby Back"
- Released: October 1966
- Recorded: 1966
- Genre: Soul
- Length: 3:29
- Label: Warner Bros. 5850
- Songwriters: Jerry Ragovoy; George David Weiss
- Producer: Jerry Ragovoy

"Stay with Me" (often credited as "Stay with Me Baby") is a soul song co-written by Jerry Ragovoy and George David Weiss. It was first recorded in 1966 by Lorraine Ellison, and produced by Ragovoy.

Ellison recorded "Stay with Me" following a studio cancellation by Frank Sinatra, which was to be produced by Jerry Ragovoy with a 46-piece orchestra. Ragovoy and arranger Garry Sherman worked up an orchestral arrangement of the song, and called Ellison into the studio to record it live with the orchestra. The recording was engineered by Phil Ramone. Described as 'possibly the best female vocal ever', "Stay with Me" is recognized for Ellison's impassioned vocals, which rise to a sonic and emotional crescendo with each chorus.

"Stay with Me" was issued as a single on the Warner record label. It entered the U.S. Billboard R&B chart on October 15, 1966, and reached No. 11; and peaked at No. 64 on the U.S. Billboard Hot 100. It would become her signature song. Her follow-up single was "Heart Be Still", a minor hit in 1967.

The track has appeared on numerous compilation albums over the years, but 2006's Sister Love: The Warner Bros. Recordings contains all Ellison's songs.

== Critical reception ==
In their November 11, 1966 issue, New Musical Express published, 'It's almost impossible to convey the depth of feeling, emotion and sensitivity expressed by Lorraine Ellison in the dramatic ballad "Stay With Me" (Warner).'

In their September 17, 1966 issue, Cashbox reported:

'Al Jefferson, Dr. Fat Daddy and the entire staff at WCHB, Detroit, say that the new Lorraine Ellison on WB, "Stay With Me," is the "R & B record of the year." Al Jefferson of WWIN says, "This is a new concept and a new dimension in SOUL. It is an entirely new direction. I congratulate producer and writer Jerry Ragavoy. I didn't think he could top his creativity with Garnet Mimms, the Enchanters and Howard Tate, but this is the ultimate!" Al said he hasn't heard anything this good in three years'

In the December 16, 1967 issue of New Musical Express, Alan Smith described being introduced to the song by Maurice Gibb of the Bee Gees:

'The first time I met Maurice he was carrying an old single by Lorraine Ellison, “Stay With Me Baby”, which he thrust on to the record player with urgency and delight. Seconds later I was listening to a full-blooded, screaming, beautiful, agonised, ecstatic, sobbing, sexual, soaring performance of a song that prickled the hairs at the nape of the neck. It was one of the most incredible records I've ever heard, and I raved, Maurice raved, even the man there from the BBC World Service raved. When I heard that Cilla and Lulu were also raving, that was it. My mind was made up. I asked Warner Brothers to rush me a copy as soon as they could, and I raced home and also thrust it on to the record player with urgency and delight.'

The song was ranked number 935 among the greatest singles ever made in Dave Marsh's book The Heart of Rock & Soul (1989).

== Cover versions ==
"Stay With Me" has been covered by numerous musicians, including Bette Midler, in the film The Rose.

Other versions include those by The Walker Brothers, David Essex, Ruby Turner, Rebecca Wheatley, Charity Brown, Janis Joplin, Bobby Hatfield, Robin Lee, Genya Ravan, Terry Reid, The Marmalade, Steve Marriott, Long John Baldry, Sharon Tandy, Les Fleur de Lys, Natalie Cole, Jimmy Witherspoon, Dan McCafferty, Kiki Dee, Shirley Brown, Samantha Rose, Sam Brown, Phil Seymour, Trine Rein, Whitesnake, Ronnie Montrose, Duffy, Mary J. Blige, Melissa Etheridge, La'Porsha Renae, Thunder ft. Jade Smythe and Chris Cornell. The versions by the first four artists named in the previous sentence, all reached the UK Singles Chart.

Duffy's version was the only newly recorded song on the soundtrack of the 2009 UK comedy film, The Boat That Rocked. Although it was the original version that appeared in the film, Duffy's version featured in the closing credits.

It was also performed by Karise Eden on June 17, 2012, for her finale performance on The Voice Australia, reaching No. 1 on the ARIA Singles Chart and by La'Porsha Renae on March 31, 2016 on the final season of American Idol.

Alisan Porter covered the song on The Voice, season 10.

== Charts ==
Chart (1966–67)	Peak position
Canada Top Singles (RPM)	58
UK R&B (Record Mirror)	6
US Billboard Hot 100	64
US Hot R&B/Hip-Hop Songs (Billboard)	11
US Cashbox Top 100	66
US Cashbox R&B	16
US Record World R&B	9
Chart (1969)	Peak position
UK R&B (Record Mirror)	14
Chart (1975)	Peak position
UK Singles (Record Mirror)	56
UK R&B (Record Mirror)	15
Chart (1995)	Peak position
UK Singles (Official Charts)	82
UK Hip Hop/R&B (Official Charts)	14
