= Jerry Ragovoy =

American songwriter and record producer (1930–2011)

- Also known as: Norman Meade
- Born: Jordan Ragovoy; September 4, 1930; Philadelphia, Pennsylvania, United States
- Died: July 13, 2011 (aged 80) Manhattan, New York, United States
- Genres: Pop music
- Occupations: Songwriter, record producer, studio owner
- Years active: 1953–2003

Jordan "Jerry" Ragovoy (September 4, 1930 – July 13, 2011) was an American songwriter and record producer who wrote several pop songs including the instrumental "Time Is on My Side" (under the pseudonym of Norman Meade for Kai Winding), which was recorded by the Rolling Stones with lyrics added by Jimmy Norman for an earlier version by Irma Thomas; "Stay With Me" for Lorraine Ellison (later covered by Bette Midler in the film The Rose); and "Piece of My Heart", which became a significant hit for Janis Joplin when still with Big Brother and the Holding Company.

During the 1960s, Ragovoy "helped mould the new African-American sound of soul music", according to the obituary in The Guardian. During this venture, he co-wrote the Afro-pop dance song "Pata Pata" with Miriam Makeba; the song became a major hit for Makeba and was covered by numerous other artists.

He founded the New York recording studio The Hit Factory in 1969, producing and arranging artists such as Dionne Warwick and Bonnie Raitt until he sold it to Troy Germano in 1975.

== Early life and career ==
Ragovoy was born in Philadelphia, Pennsylvania, the son of a Hungarian-born Jewish optometrist. He entered record production in 1953 with "My Girl Awaits Me" by the Castelles.

Another well-known song by Ragovoy is "Piece of My Heart", co-written with Bert Berns and recorded originally by Erma Franklin, and later famously covered by Big Brother and the Holding Company, featuring Janis Joplin. Between 1966 and 1968, Ragovoy was employed as producer and songwriter for the Warner Bros subsidiary Loma Records. He also co-wrote several songs in Janis Joplin's solo career, including "Try (Just a Little Bit Harder)" (originally by Lorraine Ellison on Loma Records), "Cry Baby" (originally by Garnet Mimms and the Enchanters), "Get it While You Can" (originally by Howard Tate, covered by Joplin) and "My Baby". In 1984, Ragovoy's song "Tell Me What Can I Do", was released as a single by Crystal Gayle and Hong Kong singer Danny Chan.

Prior to Joplin's death, Ragovoy wrote a song especially for her next album, titled "I'm Gonna Rock My Way to Heaven". The song was never recorded or performed until shortly before Ragovoy's death in July 2011, when it was included in the theatrical production A Night with Janis Joplin, written and directed by Randy Johnson with arrangements and musical direction by Len Rhodes. Ragovoy was in attendance on opening night when the show premiered at Portland Center Stage on 27 May 2011.

== Later career ==
Ragovoy also produced recorded work by Bonnie Raitt and Milkwood. However, his involvement in the music industry was less prolific from the 1970s onwards.

In 1969 Ragovoy created and was the original owner of the famous world class recording complex HIT FACTORY STUDIOS in Manhattan hosting numerous well known R&R artists.

In 1973, he won a Grammy Award as producer on Best Score From an Original Cast Show Album, for Don't Bother Me, I Can't Cope.

In 1974, Ragovoy teamed up with Dionne Warwick to produce her Then Came You album, which peaked at No. 35 in the US Billboard R&B albums chart.

In 2003, Ragovoy worked again with Howard Tate. The pair returned with an acclaimed CD, Howard Tate Rediscovered, written, arranged and produced by Ragovoy.

In 2008, Ace Records released a compilation album entitled, The Jerry Ragovoy Story: Time Is on My Side.

In 2012, Ragovoy was portrayed by actor Brad Garrett in the film Not Fade Away.

== Death ==
Ragovoy died, following a stroke, on July 13, 2011, at the age of 80.

== Notable compositions ==
Song title	Artist	Others
"About This Thing Called Love"	Fabian	
"Ain't Nobody Home"	Howard Tate	B. B. King, Bonnie Raitt
"All I Know is the Way I Feel"	Irma Thomas	Howard Tate, the Pointer Sisters
"Anytime You Want Me"	Garnet Mimms and the Enchanters	The Who
"A Wonderful Dream"	The Majors	
"Cloudy with a Chance of Tears"	The Manhattans	
"Cry Baby"	Garnet Mimms and the Enchanters	Janis Joplin
"Eight Days on the Road"	Howard Tate	Aretha Franklin, Foghat
"Either Side of the Same Town"	Howard Tate	Elvis Costello
"Get It While You Can"	Howard Tate	Janis Joplin, Chris Cornell
"Girl Happy"	Elvis Presley	
"Heart Be Still"	Lorraine Ellison	Peter Straker
"I Can't Wait Until I See My Baby's Face"	Baby Washington	Aretha Franklin, Dusty Springfield, Dionne Warwick, Madeline Bell
"I'll Make It Up to You"	Garnet Mimms and the Enchanters	Manfred Mann
"I'll Take Good Care Of You"	Garnet Mimms and the Enchanters	
"It's Been Such a Long Way Home"	Garnet Mimms and the Enchanters	
"It Was Easier to Hurt Her"	Garnet Mimms and the Enchanters	Chris Farlowe, Dusty Springfield, Wayne Fontana
"Looking for You"	Garnet Mimms and the Enchanters	Chris Farlowe
"Love Makin' Music"	Barry White	
"Morning Light" (co-writer with Don Benoliel)	Louis Jordan	Royal Crown Revue
"Move Me No Mountain"	Dionne Warwick	Hank Crawford, Chaka Khan, Soul II Soul, Love Unlimited
"My Baby"	Garnet Mimms and the Enchanters	Janis Joplin, the Yardbirds
"My Girl Awaits Me"	The Castelles	
"Night Moods"	Chaka Khan	
"One Way Love"	The Drifters	Bryan Ferry, Dexy's Midnight Runners
"Pata Pata"	Miriam Makeba	Osibisa, Percy Faith
"Piece of My Heart"	Erma Franklin	Big Brother and the Holding Company, the Brooklyn Bridge, Dusty Springfield, the Move, Bonnie Tyler, Faith Hill, Janis Joplin
"Ring Bell"	Miriam Makeba	
"Stay with Me"	Lorraine Ellison	Sharon Tandy, the Walker Brothers, Bette Midler, Terry Reid, Phil Seymour, Michael Grimm, Ten Wheel Drive, Steve Marriott, Chris Cornell
"Stop"	Howard Tate	James Gang, Jimi Hendrix, Band of Gypsies, Melvins, Super Session (Al Kooper, Mike Bloomfield & Stephen Stills)
"Sure Thing"	Dionne Warwick	
"Tell Me What Can I Do"	Crystal Gayle, Danny Chan	Joey Carbone
"Time Is on My Side"	Kai Winding	Irma Thomas, the Rolling Stones, the Moody Blues, Tracy Nelson
"Try (Just a Little Bit Harder)"	Lorraine Ellison	Janis Joplin
"What's It Gonna Be"	Dusty Springfield	Barbara Acklin
"What Is Love"	Miriam Makeba	Bojoura, Covers: "Saat" by Arhan Tekvar, "Svaret Är Kärleken" by Monica Zetterlund, "Un Libro Una Storia" by Tomas Milian
"Where Did My Baby Go"	Butterfield Blues Band	
"You Better Believe It"	Small Faces	
"You Don't Know Nothing About Love"	Carl Hall	Lorraine Ellison, Renée Geyer, Ryan Shaw, Jill Scott, Mighty Sam McClain, Chris Cornell
"You Got It"	Diana Ross	
