= Man Next Door =

Song originally recorded by The Paragons

"Man Next Door" (also known as "Quiet Place" or "I've Got to Get Away") is a song composed and adapted by John Holt and first recorded by his group The Paragons in 1968. Holt's song is partially based on the original composition, "Quiet Place", recorded by Soul R & B artist Garnet Mimms & The Enchanters, released in 1963 on his Cry Baby album.

The Paragons version was produced by Duke Reid and first released on his Duke label as the B-side of "Left with a Broken Heart".

The song has been covered by numerous other reggae artists including Dennis Brown, UB40 and Horace Andy who also sang on a more electronic version of the song for the Massive Attack album Mezzanine, with samples of the drum break from Led Zeppelin's cover of "When the Levee Breaks" and The Cure's "10:15 Saturday Night". The song was released as a single by The Slits in 1980, when it reached number 5 on the UK Indie Chart, staying on the chart for 13 weeks. Holt's version also formed the basis of L.E.G.A.C.Y.'s rap version, while Horace Andy's "Quiet Place" was used as the basis of deejay versions from Dr Alimantado ("Poison Flour" and "I Shall Fear No Evil"), I-Roy ("Noisy Place") and The Dirty Heads ("Neighborhood"). U-Roy recorded a deejay version of the song with "Peace and Love in the Ghetto" and later again in his album Solid Gold, with the participation of Santigold. In 2012, the electronic music group Sweet Valley sampled "Man Next Door" in their track "Golden Gauntlet".

The song was used to introduce the "I Saw You Coming" sketches in Harry & Paul from series 2.
