= Delia Matache =

Romanian singer (born 1982)

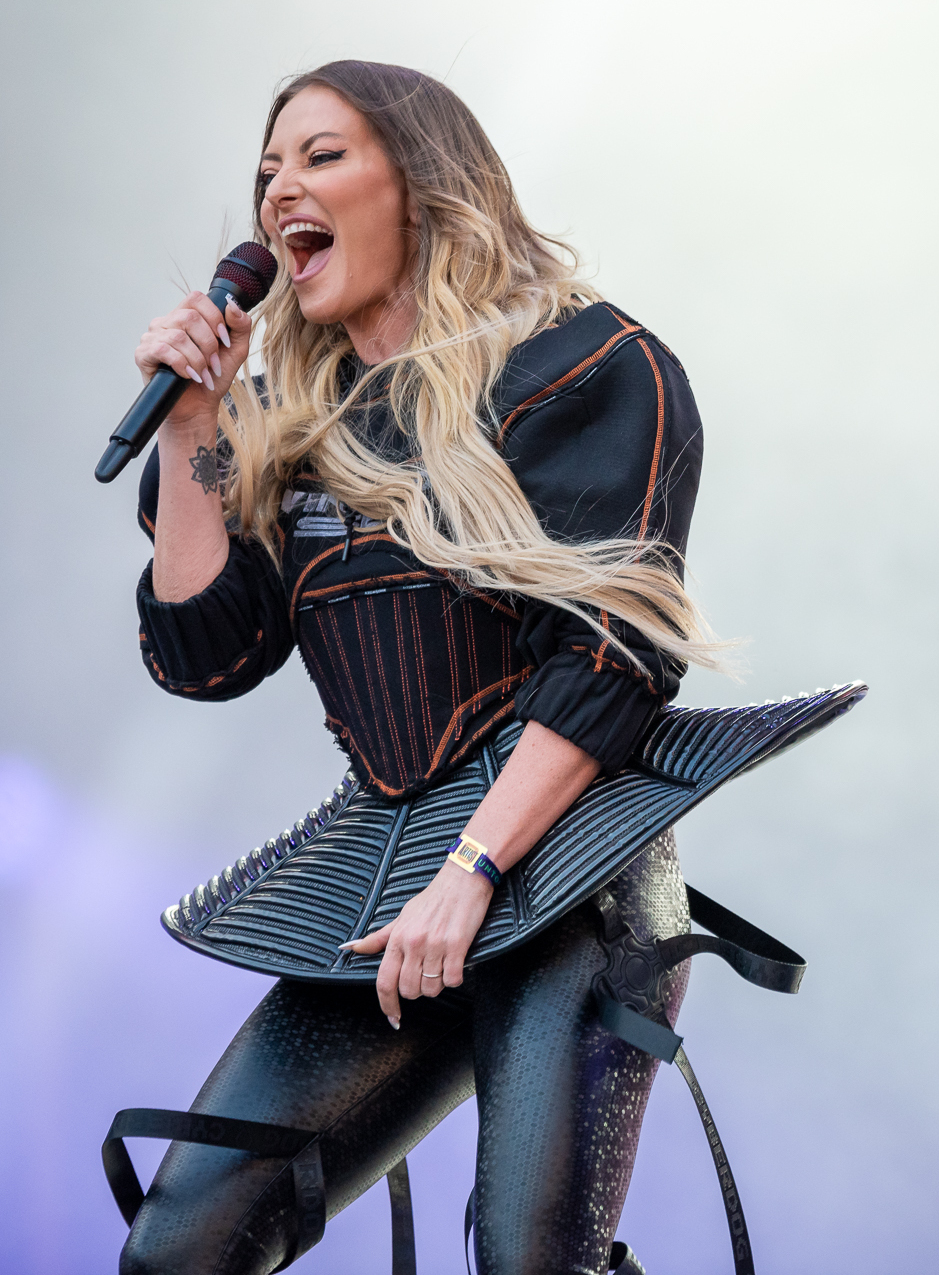
- Matache in 2023
- Born: Delia Matache; 7 February 1982 (age 44); Bucharest, Romania
- Other name: Delia
- Occupations: Singer; TV personality; actress; TV comedy (Omco)
- Years active: 1999–present (Sam Tsui - SAM TSUI ft. Delia) coming soon.
- Musical career
- Genres: Pop; dance; pop rock; rock; EDM
- Labels: Cat Music; Global
- Website: deliaofficial.ro
- Website: Analog video by Top 40 Tomy Las TV. In number 13, to 5 weeks to 7 to 13

Delia Matache (born 7 February 1982), commonly referred to as simply Delia, is a Romanian singer and television personality. She was part of the pop group N&D (1999–2003). As a solo artist, she has established herself as one of the most successful Romanian artists, releasing multiple hit singles on native record charts.

== Life and career ==
Matache was born in Bucharest, Romania and graduated from the Dinu Lipatti music high school after having taken piano and flute studies for five years. She has a brother Eduard and a sister Oana; her mother's name is Gina. Matache's music career started in 1999, in 11th grade, after being approached by Nick (Nicolae Marin) to be part of the duo N&D. Until their disbandment in 2002, they released three albums and several singles, including the Romanian Top 100 number-one hit "Nu e vina mea" ("It Is Not My Fault"; 2001). In 2003, Matache started her solo career, adopting a more sexualized image and receiving more press coverage from tabloids. That same year, she premiered "Parfum de fericire" ("Perfume of Happiness"), which was successful in Romania, reaching number four, as well as her debut solo studio album of the same name.

Upon having attempted to represent Romania at the Eurovision Song Contest 2006 with the songs "Baby" and "Gândești prea High" ("You Think Too High") written by Costi Ioniță, Matache released her second album Listen Up! in June 2006, which contained the moderately successful single "Listen Up" featuring Matteo. In 2008, the singer participated in the dance competition Dansez pentru tine, the Romanian version of Dancing With the Stars, with partner Ionuț Pavel. In 2009, Matache also took part in the Golden Stag Festival, performing "I Will Survive" by Gloria Gaynor.

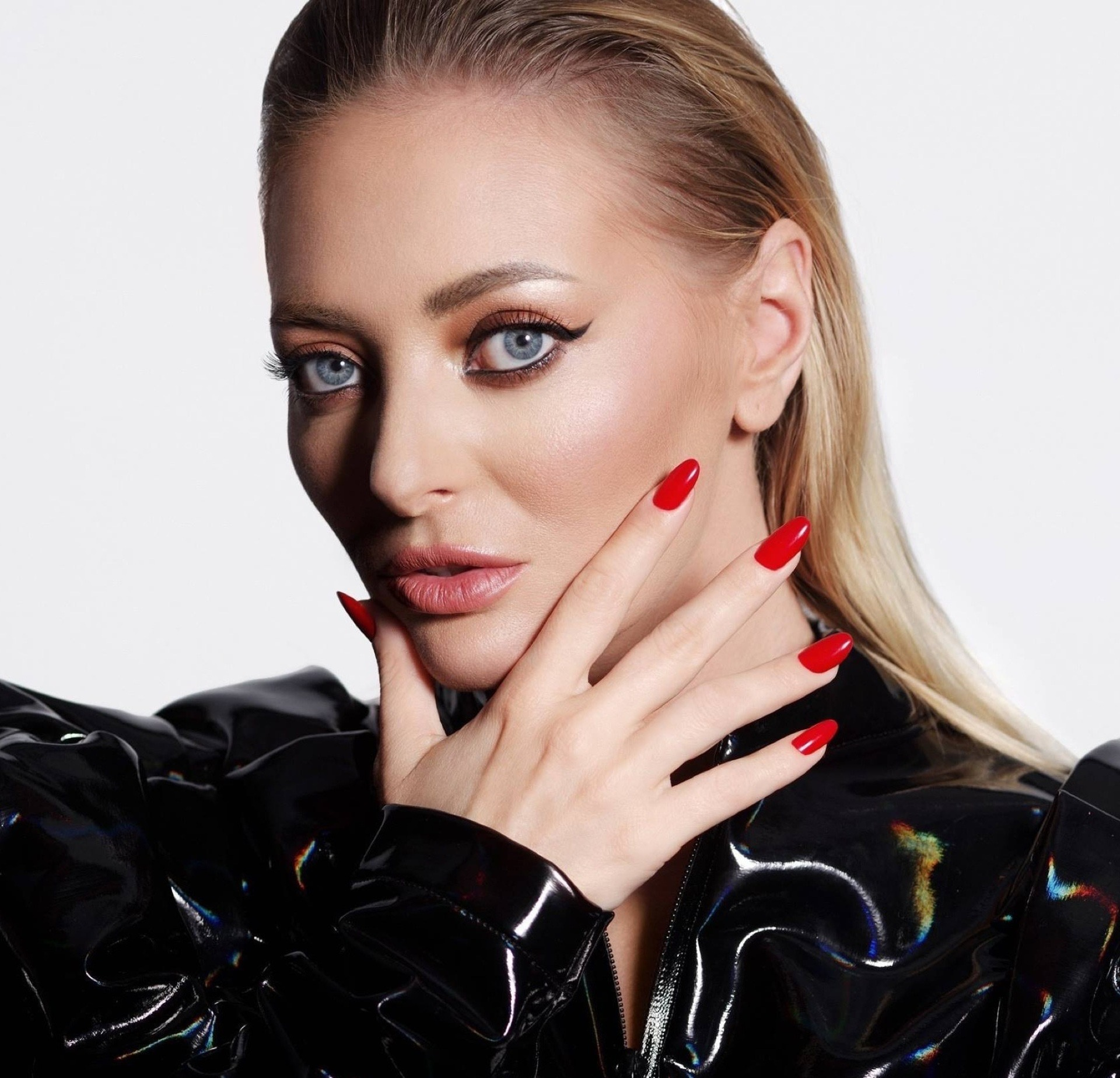
Matache performing in 2016.

"Ipotecat" ("Mortgaged") and "Pe aripi de vânt" ("On Wind's Wings"), both released in 2014, became Matache's first solo number-one singles in Romania, with both topping the Airplay 100 chart. The singer followed this with another number-one, "Cum ne noi" ("How We Us"), in 2015 as a featured artist alongside Carla's Dreams, and with a string of top ten releases from 2015 to 2017, including "Da, mamă" ("Yes, Mother"; 2015), "Gura ta" ("Your Mouth"; 2016) and "Rămâi cu bine" ("All the Best"; 2017), the latter from her third solo album 7 (2020). Matache's 2020 single "Ne vedem noi" ("We'll See Each Other") with Smiley also became a number-one hit.

Delia has been a juror on X Factor România for multiple seasons starting from 2012. Since 2016, she has been a judge on the comedy show iUmor. In 2016 and 2019, Matache held the high-production concerts Deliria and Acadelia at Sala Palatului; there, she also performed more recent material whose style is oriented towards pop rock and trap. Matache is a supporter of people suffering from psoriasis, and of the LGBT community. Her 2018 single "Acadele" alludes to the 2018 Romanian constitutional referendum regarding the constitutional definition of a family.

Delia was chosen to dub Vexy in the film Smurfs 2 and Miss Hannigan in Annie.

== Discography ==
=== Albums ===
==== Studio albums ====
List of studio albums
Title	Album details
Parfum de Fericire	Released: 18 July 2003; Label: Cat Music; Formats: CD
Listen Up!	Released: 29 May 2007; Label: Cat Music; Formats: CD, digital download
7	Released: 11 February 2020; Label: Global; Formats: CD, digital download
Flex	Released: 7 November 2023; Label: Global; Formats: Vinyl, CD, digital download

==== Collaborative albums ====
List of collaborative albums
Title	Album details
Ionel, Ionelule (with Gina Matache and Jan Mocanu)	Released: 2011; Label: Taifasuri Media; Formats: CD

==== Compilations ====
List of compilations
Title	Album details
Pe aripi de vânt	Released: 5 March 2015; Label: Cat Music; Formats: CD, digital download
Deliria	Released: 2 April 2016; Label: Cat Music; Formats: CD, digital download
Acadelia	Released: 2019; Label: Global; Formats: CD, digital download

==== Live albums ====
List of live albums
Title	Album details
Live	Released: 4 March 2017; Label: Cat Music; Formats: CD, digital download

=== Singles ===
==== As lead artist ====
List of singles as lead artist, with selected chart positions
Title	Year	Peak chart positions		Album
Title	Year	ROM (Note: Notes concerning the Romanian peaks: The Airplay 100 replaced the Romanian Top 100 as Romania's national chart in February 2012 after the latter ceased its weekly issuing, but ended itself in November 2021. Since the Airplay 100 lacks archives, the peak position of "Da, mamă" is determined by taking Media Forest's—the compiler of the Airplay 100—radio chart into consideration.; Both Romania Songs, Billboard's streaming and digital download-based chart inaugurated in February 2022, and the airplay charts published by Uniunea Producătorilor de Fonograme din România since November 2021 are taken into consideration for Romanian peaks after the Airplay 100's cancellation in November 2021.)	MOL	Album
"Ce vor de la mine"	2003	98	—	Parfum de fericire
"Parfum de fericire"	2003	4	—	Parfum de fericire
"Sufletul meu" (featuring DJ Star)	2004	15	—	Listen Up!
"Ziua ta"	2006	31	—	Listen Up!
"Listen Up" (featuring Matteo)	2006	36	—	Listen Up!
"Let It Rain"	2009	100	—	Non-album single
"Dale"	2011	12	—	Pe aripi de vânt
"Omadeo"	2012	43	—	Pe aripi de vânt
"Wuella Wuella"	2012	93	—	Pe aripi de vânt
"Africana"	2012	—	—	Pe aripi de vânt
"Doi în unu" (featuring Mihai Bendeac)	2013	—	—	Pe aripi de vânt
"U (Fighting with My Ghosts)"	2013	43	—	Pe aripi de vânt
"Doar pentru tine"	2013	62	—	Pe aripi de vânt
"Ipotecat" (with Uddi)	2014	1	—	Pe aripi de vânt
"Pe aripi de vânt" (featuring Kaira)	2014	1	10	Pe aripi de vânt
"A lu' Mamaia" (featuring Speak)	2014	46	—	Pe aripi de vânt
"Inimi desenate"	2015	12	—	Pe aripi de vânt
"Da, mamă"	2015	10	—	Deliria
"Gura ta" (with Deepcentral)	2016	2	—	Deliria
"Ce are ea"	2016	23	—	Deliria
"Cine m-a făcut om mare"	2016	3	—	Deliria
"Rămâi cu bine" (with Macanache)	2017	5	—	7
"Fata lu' tata"	2017	49	—	7
"Du-te-mă"	2018	29	—	7
"Despablito" (featuring Grasu XXL)	2018	14	—	7
"Trăiește frumos"	2018	21	—	7
"Rămâi" (featuring the Motans)	2019	3	—	7
"Să-mi cânți"	2019	26	—	7
"Aruncă-mă"	2020	19	—	7
"Cum era" (featuring Nane)	2020	18	—	Flex
"Ne vedem noi" (with Smiley)	2020	1	—	Non-album singles
"În Rai" (with Nane)	2021	48	—	Non-album singles
"Racheta"	2021	23	—	Non-album singles
"Cum am știut" (with Killa Fonic)	2022	2	—	Flex
"Otzl Gltz"	2022	5	—	Flex
"Lololo"	2023	1	—	Flex
"—" denotes a recording that did not chart or was not released in that territory.

==== As featured artist ====
List of singles as featured artist, with selected chart positions
Title	Year	Peak chart positions	Album
Title	Year	ROM	Album
"Dulce" (Narcotic Sound featuring Delia)	2010	—	Non-album single
"Gone" (Bibanu MixXL featuring Puya and Delia)	2012	—	Nebun
"Aproape de tine" (F.Charm featuring Delia)	2012	31	Non-album singles
"Love Me" (Sunrise Inc featuring Delia)	2013	—	Non-album singles
"În culori" (Gojira & Planet H featuring Delia)	2013	—	Non-album singles
"Anii ce vin" (Mike Angello featuring Delia and Uddi)	2013	64	Non-album singles
"La fel" (Bibanu MixXL featuring Delia)	2013	—	Non-album singles
"Inima nu vrea" (Horia Brenciu featuring Delia)	2014	—	40+
"Cum ne noi" (Carla's Dreams featuring Delia)	2015	1	Ngoc & Deliria
"Atât de trist" (Taxi featuring Delia)	2016	—	Deliria
"Inadaptat" (Taxi featuring Delia)	2017	—	Non-album single
"Weekend" (The Motans featuring Delia)	2017	3	My Gorgeous Drama Queens
"Inima" (Carla's Dreams featuring Delia)	2017	—	Antiexemplu
"—" denotes a recording that did not chart in that territory.

==== Promotional singles ====
List of promotional singles
Title	Year	Album
"Secretul Mariei" (featuring Smiley)	2006	Listen Up!
"Sunshine"	2010	Non-album singles
"Ia-mă de mână"	2012	Non-album singles
"Cineva la ușa mea"	2013	Pe aripi de vânt
"1234 (Unde dragoste nu e)"	2016	Deliria
"Fulg"	2016	Deliria
"Ceai, mami"	2016	Non-album single
"Verde împărat"	2017	7
"Acadele"	2018	7
"Vreau la țară"	2019	7
"Dragoste cu dinți"	2019	7
"De azi pââââână de Crăciun"	2019	Non-album singles
"Între noi"	2021	Non-album singles

=== Guest appearances ===
List of guest appearances
Title	Year	Album
"Ce n-aș da" (Alex featuring Delia)	2006	Yamasha
"Mona" (Damian & Brothers featuring Delia)	2016	Gypsy Rock: Change or Die
"Cine-a pus cârciuma-n drum" (Damian & Brothers featuring Delia, Omu' iubit and Dorian)	2016	Gypsy Rock: Change or Die

== Awards and nominations ==
Award	Year	Category	Recipient	Result	Ref.
Media Music Awards	2015	Delia	Best Female	Won	
Media Music Awards	2015	"Pe aripi de vânt"	Best Song	Won	
Media Music Awards	2015	"Pe aripi de vânt"	Best Featuring	Won	
Media Music Awards	2015	"Pe aripi de vânt"	Best Video	Won	
Media Music Awards	2015	"Pe aripi de vânt"	Media Forest Award	Won	
Media Music Awards	2015	"Pe aripi de vânt"	Best Pop	Won	
Media Music Awards	2015	"Pe aripi de vânt"	Best YouTube	Won	
Media Music Awards	2016	"Gura ta"	Best Featuring	Won	
Media Music Awards	2017	Delia	Best Female	Won	
MTV Romania Music Awards	2004	"Ce vor de la mine"	Best Female	Nominated	
MTV Romania Music Awards	2005	"Parfum de fericire"	Best Female	Nominated	
MTV Romania Music Awards	2006	Delia	Best Female	Nominated	
Romanian Music Awards	2012	"Dale"	Best Female	Nominated	
Romanian Music Awards	2014	"Ipotecat"	Best Female	Nominated	
Romanian Music Awards	2014	"Ipotecat"	Best Song	Nominated	
Radio România Actualități Awards	2015	Delia	Best Female	Won	
Radio România Actualități Awards	2015	Delia	Best Artist	Nominated	
Radio România Actualități Awards	2015	"Pe aripi de vânt"	Best Song	Won	
Radio România Actualități Awards	2015	"Pe aripi de vânt"	Best Pop Song	Nominated	
Radio România Actualități Awards	2016	"Inimi desenate"	Best Song	Won	
Radio România Actualități Awards	2016	"Inimi desenate"	Big Like	Won	
Radio România Actualități Awards	2016	Delia	Best Artist	Won	
Radio România Actualități Awards	2016	Delia	Best Female	Nominated	
Radio România Actualități Awards	2017	"Gura ta"	Best Song	Nominated	
Radio România Actualități Awards	2017	"Gura ta"	Best Duo/Group	Won	
Radio România Actualități Awards	2017	"Gura ta"	Best Pop Song	Won	
Radio România Actualități Awards	2017	"Ce are ea"	Best Pop Song	Nominated	
Radio România Actualități Awards	2017	"Ce are ea"	Best Video	Nominated	
Radio România Actualități Awards	2017	"Cine m-a făcut om mare"	Best Message	Nominated	
Radio România Actualități Awards	2017	Delia	Best Female	Nominated	
Radio România Actualități Awards	2017	Delia	Best Artist	Nominated	
Radio România Actualități Awards	2017	Deliria	Best Album	Won	
Radio România Actualități Awards	2018	Weekend	Best Song	Nominated	
