= Sharon Tandy =

South African singer (1943–2015)

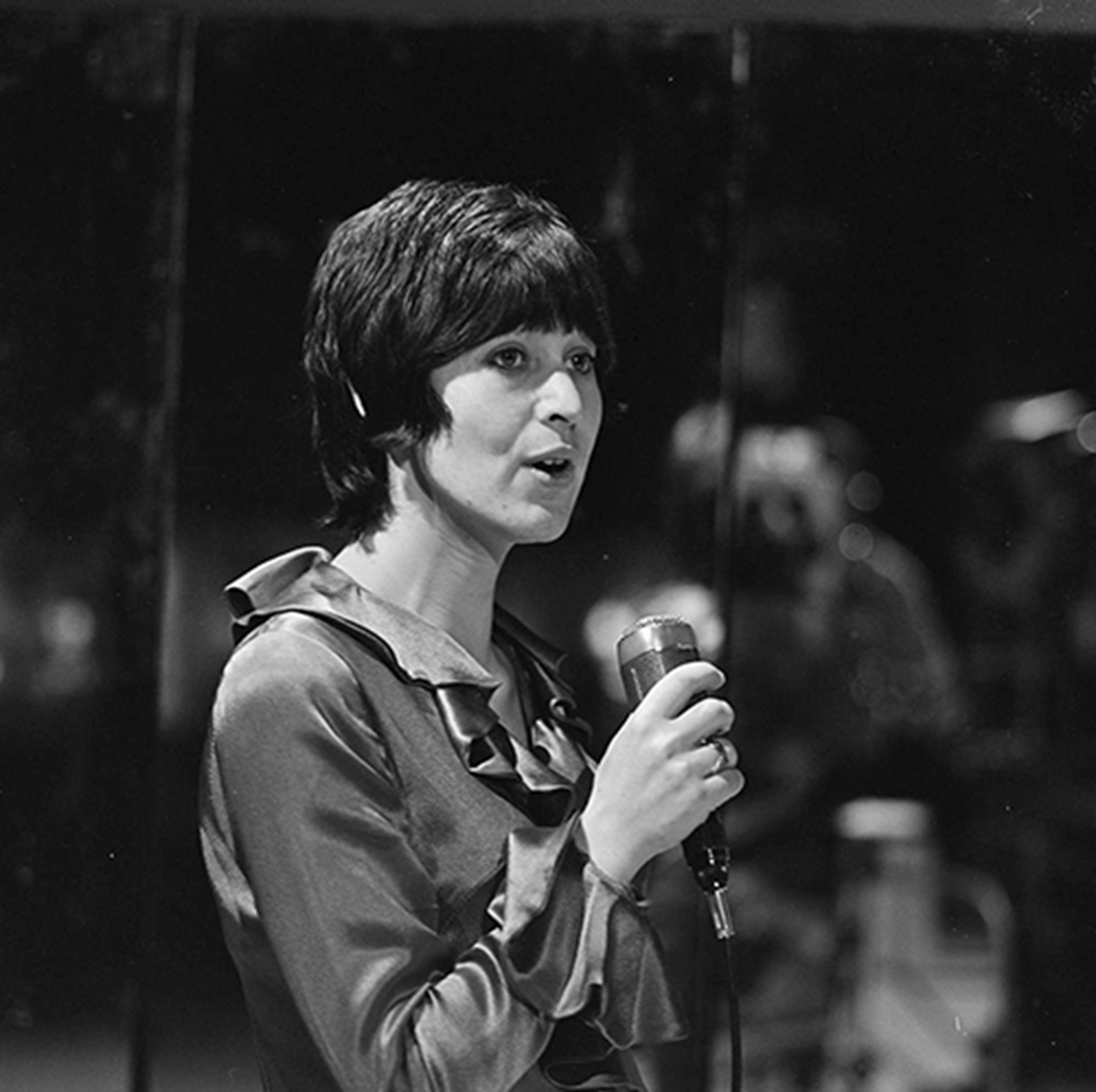
- Tandy performing on Dutch TV in 1968

Background information
- Born: Sharon Finkelstein; 18 September 1943; Johannesburg, South Africa
- Died: 21 March 2015 (aged 71) London, England
- Genres: Blue-eyed soul, freakbeat
- Years active: 1965–2015
- Labels: Pye, Mercury, Atlantic

Sharon Tandy (born Sharon Finkelstein; 18 September 1943 – 21 March 2015) was a South African singer who achieved some success in the United Kingdom in the 1960s as part of the blue-eyed soul and psychedelic movements. In 1966, she recorded some songs at Stax studios, a rarity for a white singer. She also had several chart hits in South Africa in the 1970s.

== 1960s ==
Based in Johannesburg, South Africa, Tandy appeared in South Africa's first beat film, Africa Shakes, and moved to England in 1964 at the suggestion of Frank Fenter, UK head of Atlantic Records, whom she later married. She released several singles between 1965 and 1969, and although none was a hit, she appeared on several contemporary television programmes, such as Beat Club. She has been described by Richie Unterberger as "blue-eyed soul singer rather in the mould of Dusty Springfield, both in terms of her voice and her versatility, blending various shades of soul, British pop, and even some tinges of mod-psychedelia." Her voice has also been compared to those of Julie Driscoll and Christine Perfect.

In 1966 she recorded tracks at Stax Records' McLemore Avenue studios, backed by Booker T. & the M.G.'s and Isaac Hayes, and was an opening act on the 1967 Stax/Volt Tour of Europe. That year she also teamed up with another of Fenter's bands, Les Fleur de Lys and recorded several singles for the Atlantic label and a session for John Peel's "Top Gear". She recorded a single for Polydor in 1967 credited to "Debrah Aire" featuring more pop styled tracks, but this also flopped. The combination of lack of commercial success and the breakdown of her relationship with Fenter led to her return to South Africa in 1970.

== Later career ==
As half of various duets, Tandy scored three South African Top Ten hits between 1972 and 1978. However, little success followed these recordings. In 1989, she appeared in the South African boxing film Brutal Glory as a singer.

After her return to the UK, nostalgic interest in 2004 resulted in her playing a gig at London's 100 Club; a reviewer commented

"the band struck up with a couple of driving soul numbers and were then joined by the diminutive Tandy to a rapturous reception. The smile on Sharon's face could have lit up a small town and did not once dim throughout the show... Sharon simply radiated enjoyment, absolutely loving the opportunity to be singing again."

== Personal life and death ==
Sharon has one daughter, Wendy Crabb (Maas). She has three grandchildren - Leigh Marti (1990), Kelly Van Der Linde (1994), Kaila-Lee Crabb (2009). Sharon is a great-grandmother to Kade Van Der Linde (2017) and Kenzie Van Der Linde (2021).

Sharon Tandy died on 21 March 2015, after a long illness.

== Discography ==
=== Singles ===
1960s UK

- 1965 – "Now That You've Gone" / "Hurtin' Me" (Pye Records 7N 15806)
- 1965 – "I've Found Love" / "Perhaps Not Forever" (Pye 7N15939)
- 1965 – "It's An Uphill Climb to the Bottom" / "Don't Be Proud" (Polydor NH 58103, withdrawn)
- 1966 – "Love Makes the World Go Round" / "By My Side" (Mercury Records MF 898)
- 1967 – "Toe Hold" / "I Can't Get Over It" (Atlantic 584 098)
- 1967 – "Stay with Me" / "Hold On" (Atlantic 584 124)
- 1967 – "Our Day Will Come" / "Look And Find" (Atlantic 584 137)
- 1967 – "This Land of Mine" / "What The World Needs Now Is Love" (Polydor 56180) credited to "Debrah Aire"
- 1968 – "Fool on the Hill" / "For No One" (Atlantic 584 166)
- 1968 – "Love Is Not A Simple Affair" / "Hurry Hurry Choo Choo" (Atlantic 584 181)
- 1968 – "You've Gotta Believe It" / "Border Town" (Atlantic 584 194)
- 1968 – "The Way She Looks at You" / "He'll Hurt Me" (Atlantic 584 214)
- 1968 – "Hold On" / "Daughter of the Sun" (Atlantic 584 219)
- 1969 – "Gotta Get Enough Time" / "Somebody Speaks Your Name" (Atlantic 584 242)
- 1969 – "Two Can Make It Together" / "The Bitter and the Sweet" (Atlantic 584 262)

1970s South Africa

- 1972 – "Hello-A" (duet with Billy Forest), No. 5
- 1977 – "I Believe in You" (duet with Graham Clark), No. 9
- 1978 – "Welcome Home" (as Harvest, duet with Dave Ornellas), No. 10

=== Albums ===
Solo CD

- 2004 – You Gotta Believe It's (compilation of 1960s UK singles)

Compilations

- 1972 – Formidable Rhythm N Blues, Volume 11 (Atlantic 40 261, France): "Stay with Me"
- 1999 – Here Come the Girls Vol.10 (Sequel): "Hurtin' Me", "Perhaps Not Forever"
- 2002 – Reflections 1965–1969 (Blueprint): Les Fleur de Lys compilation
- 2003 – The Rubble Collection: "Hold On" & "Daughter of the Moon"
- 2006 – The Essential 60s Love Album (Metro METRDCD593): "I've Found Love"

Guest appearances

- 1970 – Five Day Rain (self-titled album)
