= Howard Tate =

American singer-songwriter(1939–2011)

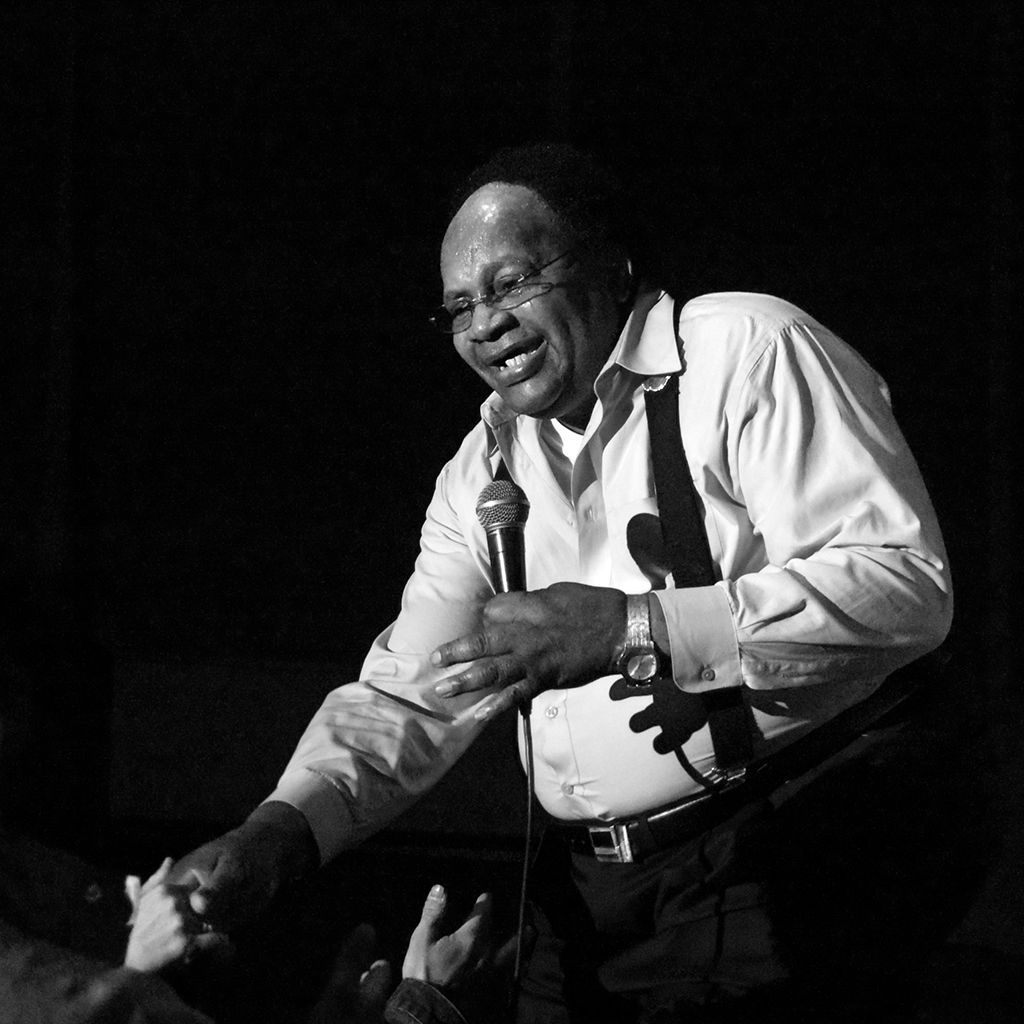
- Tate in concert in Oraison, France, August 2008

Background information
- Born: August 13, 1939; Elberton, Georgia
- Died: December 2, 2011 (aged 72) Burlington, New Jersey
- Genres: R&B, soul, gospel, Chicago blues
- Occupations: Musician, songwriter
- Instrument: Vocals
- Years active: 1962–2011
- Labels: Mercury, Cameo, Verve, Atlantic, Epic, Turntable Records, Shout! Factory, Solid Ground

Howard Tate (August 13, 1939 – December 2, 2011) was an American soul singer and songwriter.

His greatest success came with a string of hit singles in the late 1960s, including "Ain't Nobody Home" and "Get It While You Can," the latter of which became a hit when recorded by singer Janis Joplin. After withdrawing from the music business and struggling with drug addiction, Tate mounted a warmly received comeback in 2001.

== Biography ==
=== Early life ===
According to an interview Tate gave to No Depression magazine writer Edd Hurt in 2006, he was born in Elberton, Georgia. Tate pronounced the town's name as "Eberton," but the 1940 census records for Elberton show a two-year-old boy named Howard Tate as a resident of the city. . According to the census record, Tate's father was named Hult Tate and his mother Roberta Tate. He moved with his family to Philadelphia in the early 1940s. In his teens, he joined a gospel music group that included Garnet Mimms, and, as the Gainors, they recorded rhythm and blues songs for Mercury Records and Cameo Records in the early 1960s. Tate performed with the organist Bill Doggett and returned to Philadelphia.

Mimms, leading a group called the Enchanters, introduced Tate to the record producer Jerry Ragovoy, who began recording Tate for Verve Records. Utilizing New York City session musicians, including Paul Griffin, Richard Tee, Eric Gale, Chuck Rainey, and Herbie Lovelle, Tate and Ragovoy produced a series of soul blues recordings from 1966 to 1968. With Ragovoy he recorded during these years "Ain't Nobody Home", "Look at Granny Run Run", "Baby I Love You" and "Stop". The recordings were well received by record buyers. "Ain't Nobody Home", "Look at Granny" and "Stop" charted in the Top 20 of the Billboard R&B chart.

=== Career ===
Janis Joplin performed another of Tate's Ragovoy songs, "Get It While You Can" (on the album Pearl), around this time. Tate's reputation among critics was high. Robert Christgau wrote in his review of Tate's Verve recordings, "Tate is a blues-drenched Macon native who had the desire to head north and sounds it every time he gooses a lament with one of the trademark keens that signify the escape he never achieved. He brought out the best in soul pro Jerry Ragovoy, who made Tate's records jump instead of arranging them into submission, and gave him lyrics with some wit to them besides."

"This does almost as much for Tate's amazing vocal and emotional range—as cocksure as Wilson Pickett one moment, as sweet and hurting as B.B. King the next, and as corny as Joe Tex to top it off—as his Verve stuff with [Jeff] Ragovoy."

— Review of Howard Tate in Christgau's Record Guide: Rock Albums of the Seventies (1981)

Tate, working apart from Ragovoy, recorded the album Howard Tate's Reaction, produced by Lloyd Price and Johnny Nash and released in 1970 by Turntable Records, it was distributed in small quantities. Christgau wrote, "Tate's voice is potent enough to activate more inert material." The record was reissued, under the title Reaction, in 2003. Ragovoy and Tate reunited for the 1972 album Howard Tate, released by Atlantic Records; it included more songs by Ragovoy, along with Tate's cover versions of "Girl from the North Country", by Bob Dylan, and "Jemima Surrender", by Robbie Robertson and Levon Helm.

After recording a single for Epic Records and a few songs for his own label, Tate retired from the music industry in the late 1970s. He sold securities in the New Jersey and Philadelphia area. In the 1980s, after his 13-year-old daughter died in a house fire, he developed a drug habit and ended up living in a homeless shelter. In the mid-1990s, he began counseling drug abusers and mentally ill people and also worked as a preacher.

=== Rediscovery ===
Phil Casden, a disc jockey from Camden, New Jersey, discovered Tate's whereabouts early in 2001, and in spring 2001 Tate played his first date in many years, in New Orleans. He then began working with Ragovoy on the 2003 album Rediscovered. It included covers of songs by Elvis Costello and Prince and a new version of "Get It While You Can."

At the Roskilde Festival in 2004, he sang "Love Will Keep You Warm" with Swan Lee. A recording of the performance is included on the album Swan Lee: The Complete Collection (2007).

The album Howard Tate Live, recorded in Denmark in 2004, was released by Shout! Factory in 2006. Working with the producer, arranger and songwriter Steve Weisberg, Tate recorded A Portrait of Howard, released in 2006 on the independent Solid Ground label. It included compositions by Randy Newman, Nick Lowe, Lou Reed and Carla Bley, along with songs written by Tate and Weisberg. In late 2007, Tate recorded Blue Day in Nashville with the producer Jon Tiven; it was released in 2008.

That year Tate was a judge for the sixth annual Independent Music Awards to support independent artists' careers.

He and his touring quartet performed songs from his catalogue at Blue Heaven Studios, for an album released in 2010 as a limited-edition vinyl-only, direct-to-disc live recording.

Tate died of complications of multiple myeloma and leukemia on December 2, 2011, at the age of 72.

== Discography ==
=== Albums ===
- Get It While You Can (April 1967)
- Howard Tate's Reaction (1970)
- Howard Tate (1972)
- Rediscovered (2003)
- Live! (2006)
- A Portrait of Howard (2006)
- Blue Day (2008)

=== Chart singles ===
Year	Single	Chart Positions	
Year	Single	U.S. Pop	U.S. R&B
1966	"Ain't Nobody Home"	63	12
1966	"Look at Granny Run, Run"	67	12
1967	"Baby, I Love You"	—	40
1968	"Stop"	76	15
1969	"These Are the Things That Make Me Know You're Gone"	—	28
1970	"My Soul's Got A Hole in It"	100	31
