= The Castelles =

The Castelles were among the originators of the "Philadelphia sound", which features a high tenor lead, a bass, and tenors singing in close harmony, and minimal instrumentation. Its original members included George Grant, Ronald Everett, Anthony Octavius, William Taylor, and Frank Vance. In spite of its popularity with collectors, however, groups with the “Philadelphia Sound” only managed to have regional hits, not national ones.

Grant, lead singer of the Castelles, is an early first example of the high tenor sound, that would culminate with Frankie Lymon. Grant was 16 years old when his first record was cut. This was probably the average age for R&B singers at that time.

The Castelles met around 1949 in the choir at Sulzberger Junior High School in West Philadelphia. Overseen by Miss Joy Goings, the choir included Grant (Castelles), Taylor (Castelles), Octavius (Castelles), Sonny Gordon (Angels), George Tindley (Dreams), George Pounds (Cherokees), Karl English (Cherokees), Melvin Story (Cherokees), and Solomon Burke.

The original members of the Castelles were: George "Pepi" Grant (lead tenor), Octavius Anthony (first tenor), Billy Taylor (first tenor, second tenor, baritone), and Clarence Dunlap (bass). They first called themselves the "Royal Castelles", a name that George just thought up ("I liked the name"). George's nickname of "Pepi" was given to him years later by denizens of the poolhall he frequented; everyone got a nickname, and, because, with his straightened hair, he looked Spanish, he became "Crosstown Pepi".
