= The Fleur de Lys =

British band (1964–1969)

- Origin: Southampton, England
- Genres: Psychedelic rock, freakbeat
- Years active: 1964–1969
- Labels: Immediate, Polydor, Atlantic
- Past members: Frank Smith; Danny Churchill; Alex Chamberlain; Keith Guster; Gordon Haskell; Phil Sawyer; Pete Sears; Bryn Haworth; Tony Head; Tago Byers; Tim "Chris" Andrews

The Fleur de Lys (initially Les Fleur de Lys [sic]) were a British band originally formed in late 1964, in Southampton, Hampshire, England.

== History ==
They recorded singles beginning in 1965 in the transitional Beat to psychedelic music genre, later known as freakbeat. The band had varied line-ups; only drummer Keith Guster was a member throughout their history. The band disbanded in 1969.

Fleur de Lys were managed by Atlantic Records' Frank Fenter, who had also discovered Sharon Tandy, one of few white artists to record for Stax Records. Sweet Feeling's manager Howard Conder recruited the band to record the song "Reflections of Charles Brown", under the name Rupert's People. This single, heavily reminiscent of Procol Harum's "A Whiter Shade of Pale", failed to chart (except in Australia where it reached No. 13 in August 1967) despite receiving airplay but became a collectable item according to Record Collector Magazine (Issue c. 1992). The band recorded a B-side, "Hold On" which was their last work with Conder.

Jimmy Page produced their first single (and wrote the b-side). Glyn Johns produced their second release "Circles". In 1966 Chas Chandler added Jimi Hendrix to "Amen", a song they had recorded in London. They are featured on Hip Young Guitar Slinger and other reissues of 1960s British rock. A compilation of their work was issued in 1996 under the name Reflections.

They backed John Bromley on his only album.

Keyboardist Pete Sears went on to play with Sam Gopal Dream, and recorded on four early Rod Stewart albums including Every Picture Tells a Story, and was a founding member of Jefferson Starship, going on to play with Hot Tuna for 10 years, and working with artists such as John Lee Hooker, Dr. John, and Harvey Mandel. Bassist Gordon Haskell replaced Greg Lake in King Crimson before a successful solo career. Guitarist Bryn Haworth would move to the States and record an unreleased album under the name Wolfgang with a band that included acclaimed bassist Leland Sklar. He would record solo albums in the 1970s for Island Records and A&M Records, before continuing his solo career on Contemporary Christian Music labels.

== Discography ==
=== Singles ===
- 1965 - "Moondreams" (Norman Petty) / "Wait For Me" (Jimmy Page) - (Immediate IM 20, as Les Fleur De Lys)
- 1966 - "Circles" (Townshend) / "So Come On" - (Immediate IM 32, as The Fleur De Lys)
- 1966 - "Mud in Your Eye" / "I've Been Trying" (Mayfield) - (Polydor 56124)
- 1967 - "I Can See a Light" / "Prodigal Son" - (Polydor 56200)
- 1968 - "Gong With the Luminous Nose" (Haskell) / "Hammer Head" (Haskell) - (Polydor 56251)
- 1968 - "Stop Crossing the Bridge" (Dee, Potter) / "Brick by Brick (Stone by Stone)" (Dee, Potter) - (Atlantic 584 193)
- 1969 - "(You're Just A) Liar" (Haworth, Potter) / "One Girl City" - (Atlantic 584 243)

=== Compilation albums ===
- 1991 - Les Fleurs de Lys (FDL 1005)
- 1996 - Reflections (Blueprint/Voiceprint BP256CD)
- 2013 - You've Got To Earn It (Acid Jazz Records AJX 324)

=== EPs ===
- 2009 - The Two Sides of the Fleur De Lys EP (Acid Jazz AJX225S)
