= Garnet Mimms =

American singer (born 1933)

- Born: Garrett Mimms; November 16, 1933 (age 92); Ashland, West Virginia, U.S.
- Genres: Soul, rhythm & blues
- Years active: 1953–1978. 2007-2008
- Labels: United Artists, Veep, Verve, GSF, Arista, Evidence

Garnet Mimms (born Garrett Mimms, November 16, 1933) is an American singer, influential in soul music and rhythm and blues. He first achieved success as the lead singer of Garnet Mimms & The Enchanters and is best known for the 1963 hit "Cry Baby", later recorded by Janis Joplin. According to Steve Huey at AllMusic, his "pleading, gospel-derived intensity made him one of the earliest true soul singers [and] his legacy remains criminally underappreciated."

== Biography ==
Born in Ashland, West Virginia, United States, Mimms grew up in Philadelphia, where he sang in church choirs and in gospel groups such as the Evening Stars and the Harmonizing Four. He first recorded as a member of the Norfolk Four, for Savoy Records in 1953. He returned to Philadelphia after serving in the military and, after a spell in a doo-wop group, the Deltones, formed another group, the Gainors, in 1958, with Sam Bell, Willie Combo, John Jefferson, and Howard Tate. The Gainors recorded several singles over the next few years for the Red Top, Mercury and Talley Ho labels, but failed to have any chart success. Mimms and Bell left the group in 1961, and joined with Charles Boyer and Zola Pearnell to form Garnet Mimms and the Enchanters.

The group moved from Philadelphia to New York in 1963, and began to work with the songwriter and record producer Bert Berns, who signed them to the United Artists label and teamed them with fellow songwriter and producer Jerry Ragovoy. Dominic Turner wrote that "the partnership between the Enchanters on the one hand and Ragovoy and Berns on the other was very much an experiment in applying Mimms' gospel and deep soul roots to the new uptown soul in vogue in New York." The new team had an immediate hit with "Cry Baby", written by Berns and Ragovoy, and with uncredited vocal backing by the Gospelaires, featuring Dionne Warwick, Dee Dee Warwick, and Estelle Brown. The song topped the R&B chart and reached number four on the Billboard Hot 100 in 1963. It sold over one million copies and was certified gold. The group followed it up with "For Your Precious Love," a cover of Jerry Butler and the Impressions' original, which hit the Billboard Top 30 later that year, as did the flip side, "Baby Don't You Weep." Another hit recording with the Enchanters, "A Quiet Place", became a popular song among the Carolina beach music community. "A Quiet Place" was also adapted with enduring appeal by many Reggae artists, including John Holt,The Paragons, Horace Andy, Doctor Alimantado and Dennis Brown. The reggae versions were released under a number of different titles, the most well-known being "Man Next Door".

In 1964, Mimms left the Enchanters for a solo career; with Sam Bell as lead vocalist, the group went on to have a minor hit with "I Wanna Thank You". Mimms continued to record for United Artists, and had several minor R&B hits over the next two years, including "One Girl" and a cover of the Jarmels' "A Little Bit of Soap." Some of his recordings at that time, including "It Was Easier to Hurt Her", "As Long As I Have You", and "Looking For You", later became popular on the British Northern soul scene. Berns and Ragovoy produced Mimms' final Top 40 hit in 1966, "I'll Take Good Care Of You", which climbed to number 15 in the R&B chart and number 30 in the Hot 100. Mimms also released three albums on United Artists, As Long As I Have You (1964), I'll Take Good Care Of You, and Warm and Soulful (both 1966).

He moved to the UA subsidiary label Veep in 1966, releasing several singles including "My Baby", later recorded by Janis Joplin; the song also made the live setlist of the last edition of the Yardbirds/early Led Zeppelin, and the following year he toured in the UK with Jimi Hendrix. An album, Garnet Mimms Live, was recorded with Scottish band 'The Senate' (who featured drummer Robbie McIntosh, later of the Average White Band), and was released in the UK in 1967. He continued to work with Ragovoy, and in 1968 started recording for Verve Records. OF SPECIAL NOTE: In 1968–69, Led Zeppelin performed an extended version of Mimms' "As Long As I Have You" as an early improv showcase piece on their UK and US tours (they used Mimms' song until they recorded "Whole Lotta Love", and then this new song became their improv showcase piece). Mimms' final recordings for several years were issued on the GSF label in 1972.

In the late 1970s, he released a few funk songs under the name Garnet Mimms and the Truckin' Company. He had his only hit in the UK at this time, when "What It Is", produced by Randy Muller of Brass Construction, reached number 44 for one week on the UK Singles Chart in June 1977. Mimms later told the Philadelphia Inquirer, “after my father passed in `78, I just lost the zeal for that kind of music. Disco came in, with the lights and the loud music. I was always a balladeer. I didn’t like all that loud stuff.”

Mimms gave up his music career shortly afterwards. He became a born-again Christian, and in the 1980s found his calling ministering to lost souls as part of the New Jerusalem Prison Ministry. He later established the Bottom Line Revival Ministries, again ministering to prisoners. In 2007 he returned to recording, and a year later released a new album Is Anybody Out There? on the Evidence label, produced and (primarily) written by Jon Tiven. AllMusic's review stated, "The material is all retro soul-gospel and leaves his previous solo gospel outing in the dust." Tiven co-wrote songs for the album with Felix Cavaliere, P.F. Sloan, Little Milton and Spooner Oldham, among others.

Mimms was given a Pioneer Award in 1999 by the Rhythm and Blues Foundation.

== Discography ==
=== Chart singles ===
Year	Title	Chart positions		
Year	Title	US Pop	US R&B	UK
1963	"Cry Baby"; Garnet Mimms & the Enchanters	4	1	-
1963	"For Your Precious Love" / Garnet Mimms & the Enchanters	26	*	-
1963	"Baby Don't You Weep"; Garnet Mimms & the Enchanters	30	*	-
1964	"Tell Me Baby"	69	*	-
1964	"One Girl" /	67	*	-
1964	"A Quiet Place"; Garnet Mimms & the Enchanters	78	*	-
1964	"Look Away"	73	*	-
1965	"A Little Bit of Soap"	95	*	-
1965	"It Was Easier to Hurt Her"	124	-	-
1965	"That Goes to Show You"	115	-	-
1966	"I'll Take Good Care Of You"	30	15	-
1966	"It's Been Such a Long Way Home"	125	-	-
1966	"My Baby"	132	-	-
1977	"What It Is"; Garnet Mimms & the Truckin' Company	-	38	44

Note: * Billboard did not publish R&B chart in this period.
