= Cry Baby (Garnet Mimms song) =

1963 song by Garnet Mimms and the Enchanters

Single by Garnet Mimms and the Enchanters

from the album Cry Baby
- B-side: "Don't Change Your Heart"
- Released: August 5, 1963
- Genre: Soul blues
- Length: 3:22
- Label: United Artists
- Songwriters: Bert Berns; Jerry Ragovoy
- Producer: Bert Berns

Garnet Mimms and the Enchanters singles chronology
"Cry Baby" (1963)	"For Your Precious Love" (1963)

"Cry Baby" is a song originally recorded by Garnet Mimms and the Enchanters, in 1963, and later recorded by rock singer Janis Joplin in 1970. Bert Berns wrote the song with Jerry Ragovoy. Garnet Mimms and the Enchanters recorded it for the United Artists record label. It topped the R&B chart and went to No. 4 on the Billboard Hot 100 chart in 1963, paving the way for soul hits by Aretha Franklin and Otis Redding later in the decade. The third verse was spoken by Mimms until the repeated refrain of the repeated song title. In Canada the song reached No. 5 on the CHUM Charts. On the New Zealand lever hit parade it peaked at No. 5

== Janis Joplin version ==
"Cry Baby"

Single by Janis Joplin and Full Tilt Boogie Band

from the album Pearl
- B-side: "Mercedes Benz"
- Released: 1971
- Recorded: 1970
- Genre: Soul
- Length: 3:55
- Label: Columbia
- Songwriters: Bert Berns; Jerry Ragovoy
- Producer: Paul A. Rothchild

In September and October 1970, Janis Joplin recorded it for her album Pearl, posthumously released in 1971. The song was in more of a blues-rock style and produced by Paul A. Rothchild. Her rendition reached No. 42 on the US Billboard Hot 100, and No. 20 on Cash Box. The B-side included the track "Mercedes Benz".

The song became usual in Joplin's repertoire and today is often performed by many artists such as Joss Stone, Allison Iraheta, Magdolna Rúzsa.
