= Mihai Bendeac =

Romanian actor, comedian, parodist and TV show host

Mihai Bendeac (Romanian pronunciation: [miˈhaj benˈde̯ak]; born 16 February 1983; is a Romanian actor, comedian, parodist and TV show host, best known for the shows La Bloc, Băieți De Oraș, În Puii Mei, Românii au artiști, Teatru TV, iComedy, Jurnalul unui burlac and Mondenii. He returned to jury the show România Dansează in 2016, in season 3, after having missed season 2 and will jury alongside Monica Petrică and Mihai Petre, with whom he collaborated in the play In Puii Mei . Mihai Bendeac wrote the poem Nu mai aștept.

== Filmography ==
- Milionari de weekend (2004) - barman Alex
- The Rest Is Silence (2008) - reporter of the newspaper Epoca
- Supraviețuitorul (2008) - "Poker", Russian roulette player
- Poker (2010) - Cătălin
- Portrait of the Fighter as a Young Man (2010) - Platoon Sergeant Ion
- Băieți de oraș (2016) – Robert 'Roby' Manea (TV series)
- Căsătoria (2024) – Pagubă (and directorial debut)
- Băieți de oraș: Golden boyz (2026) – Roby Roberto Manea (and director)
