= For Your Precious Love =

1958 single by Jerry Butler and the Impressions

Single by Jerry Butler and The Impressions
- B-side: "Sweet Was the Wine"
- Released: 1958
- Recorded: 1958
- Studio: Universal Recording Corp. (Chicago)
- Genre: Rhythm and blues
- Length: 2:41
- Label: Falcon; 1013
- Songwriters: Arthur Brooks, Richard Brooks and Jerry Butler

"For Your Precious Love" is a song written by Arthur Brooks, Richard Brooks and Jerry Butler, and performed by Jerry Butler and The Impressions in 1958. The song was ranked No.335 on Rolling Stone magazine's 500 Greatest Songs of All Time in 2010.

== Chart performance ==
It was released as a single on Vee-Jay Records and peaked at No.3 on the Most Played R&B chart, and No.11 on the Billboard Top 100 charts. In Canada it reached No.18. In addition, a new version by Butler himself peaked at No.99 on the Hot 100 chart in March 1966.

== Other versions ==
The song has been covered numerous times with many versions reaching the US charts as well:

- Garnet Mimms (1963, Hot 100 No.26)
- Otis Redding - for his album The Great Otis Redding Sings Soul Ballads in 1965.
- Oscar Toney, Jr. (1967, Hot 100 No.23) (RPM No.19)
- Jackie Wilson and Count Basie (1968, Hot 100 No.49) (RPM No.46)
- Linda Jones as "Your Precious Love" (1972, Hot 100 No.74)
- Aaron Neville - for his album Orchid in the Stone in 1986.
- The Rolling Stones covered it during their sessions for 1989's Steel Wheels album. It was never released, but can be heard on YouTube.
- A 1968 version in South Africa by the Durban based group, The Flames, reached the top spot on the local charts and has been considered a classic in the country ever since.
- Roy Meriwether covered this instrumentally, on the album “Soul Knight” (1968, Capitol Records)
- David Allan Coe - on his 1984 album, “Just Divorced”.

== Popular culture ==
- The Otis Redding recording appears at the beginning of the 2006 French thriller Tell No One by Guillaume Canet and on the film's soundtrack album.
- The same recording can also be heard in the 2009 movie Mr. Nobody by Jaco Van Dormael.
- Linda Jones's version (1972) can be found among soundtracks in Ali movie of 2001 by Michael Mann.

This recording can be heard in the 1993 film A Bronx Tale directed by Robert De Niro who also stars in the movie. While the main character Cologero talks about his childhood and the neighborhood mobsters it can be heard in the background.
