= Cliché (Hush Hush) =

Studio album (reissue) by Alexandra Stan
- Released: 2 October 2013
- Genre: Dance
- Length: 25:02
- Languages: English; French
- Labels: Maan; Victor
- Producers: Andrei Nemirschi; Marcel Prodan

Alexandra Stan chronology
Saxobeats (2011)	''Cliché (Hush Hush)'' (2013)	Unlocked (2014)

Singles from Clichė (Hush Hush)
- 1. "Lemonade" Released: 12 June 2012; 2. "Cliché (Hush Hush)" Released: 3 October 2012; 3. "All My People" Released: 1 May 2013

Cliché (Hush Hush) is the reissue of Romanian recording artist Alexandra Stan's debut studio album, Saxobeats (2011). It was released for digital download on 2 October 2013 through Maan Studio; its deluxe edition was made available for digital and physical consumption on 23 October 2013 by Victor Entertainment. The record premiered following an alleged physical altercation with her former manager Marcel Prodan, which resulted in Stan taking a break from her career. Along with Andrei Nemirschi and Marcian Alin Soare, Prodan has written and produced nearly all the songs on Cliché (Hush Hush).

Being Stan's last activity with Prodan's label, the reissue additionally features three songs—"Lemonade", "Cliché (Hush Hush)" and "All My People"—which were released worldwide as singles, as intended for her second studio album. While "Lemonade" was certified Gold by the Federation of the Italian Music Industry (FIMI), the latter songs were moderately successful in Italy and Japan. Commercially, Cliché (Hush Hush) peaked at number fifty-three on the Oricon Albums Chart, having sold over 6,100 copies there.

== Background and release ==
Alexandra Stan's second studio album was delayed following an alleged physical altercation with her former manager Marcel Prodan. Stan accused him of physically attacking and blackmailing her; she also appeared injured on Romanian television. Due to this, the singer eventually decided to take a break from her career. Meanwhile, Cliché (Hush Hush), her last activity under Prodan's label—Maan Studio—was made available for consumption in Japan on 2 October 2013; a deluxe version of the record was released on 23 October 2013. It serves as a reissue of Saxobeats (2011), additionally containing three new songs—"Lemonade", "Cliché (Hush Hush)" and "All My People"—which were previously released as singles and were intended for her second studio album. The physical edition of the record is packaged in an obi-stripped jewel case, whose booklet features the cover art of Saxobeats on its back and lyrics in Japanese.

== Promotion ==
"Lemonade" was released as the first single from the reissue on 12 June 2012; its music video premiered on 4 June 2012. With music critics comparing the recording to the works of Ace of Base, Britney Spears, Lady Gaga and Kelis, "Lemonade" experienced commercial success in Europe and Japan. It peaked at number one in Bulgaria, and within the top forty in Hungary, Italy, Japan, Romania and Slovakia, being eventually certified Gold by the Federation of the Italian Music Industry (FIMI) for selling 15,000 copies in Italy. Subsequently, the title track of the record was made available for digital consumption on 3 October 2012, being promoted by a visual filmed by Iulian Moga at Palatul Snagov. The clip later drew comparison to vampire films for teenagers for a scene in which Stan is portrayed in a church surrounded by dark-clothed people. "Cliché (Hush Hush)" charted at number eleven on the Japan Hot 100, and at number fifty on Italy's FIMI chart. A "club-friendly" electro dance recording, "All My People", the last single from Cliché (Hush Hush) premiered on 1 May 2013 and featured the vocals of Prodan's fictional character, Manilla Maniacs. It was moderately successful in Italy, Japan and Romania, reaching the top sixty in the territories. The song's music video was compared by Alexandra Necula of Info Music to the work of Madonna, while its choreography to Michael Jackson's 1980s material.

== Track listing ==
All lyrics written and produced by Andrei Nemirschi and Prodan, unless stated.

Standard version
No.	Title	Length
1.	"Cliché (Hush Hush)"	3:24
2.	"All My People" (featuring Manilla Maniacs)	3:19
3.	"Lemonade"	3:31
4.	"Cliché (Hush Hush)" (Manilla Maniacs Edit)	3:51
5.	"All My People" (featuring Manilla Maniacs) (Extended Version)	4:19
6.	"Lemonade" (Cahill Edit)	3:04
7.	"Cliché (Hush Hush)" (Acoustic Version)	3:24
Total length:		25:02

Deluxe edition bonus tracks
No.	Title	Writer(s)	Length
1.	"Mr. Saxobeat"		3:15
2.	"Ting Ting"		3:55
3.	"Show Me the Way"		3:43
4.	"Lollipop (Param Pam Pam)"		3:55
5.	"Crazy"		3:28
6.	"Bitter-Sweet"		3:37
7.	"Get Back (ASAP)"		3:29
8.	"1.000.000" (featuring Carlprit)	Nemirschi; Prodan; Marcian Alin Soare	3:19
9.	"Mr. Saxobeat" (Maan Studio Remix)		3:42
10.	"Lollipop (Param Pam Pam)" (club version)		4:11
11.	"Get Back (ASAP)" (Maan Studio Remix)		3:21
12.	"Mr. Saxobeat" (extended version)		4:16
13.	"Get Back (ASAP)" (Studio Club Remix Extended Version)		4:27
14.	"1.000.000" (featuring Carlprit; Maan Studio Remix)		4:31
Total length:			53:17

== Personnel ==
Credits adapted from the liner notes of Cliché (Hush Hush).

- Alexandra Stan – lead vocals
- Carlprit – featured artist
- Andrei Nemirschi – composer, producer, photography
- Tokyo Yamada Design Office – design
- Marcel Prodan – composer, producer
- Marcian Alin Soare – composer
- Shogo Yamada – art direction, design

== Charts ==
Chart performance for Cliché (Hush Hush)
Chart (2013)	Peak position
Japanese Albums (Oricon)	53

== Sales ==
Sales for Cliché (Hush Hush)
Region	Certification	Certified units/sales
Japan	None	6,109

== Release history ==
Release history and formats for Cliché (Hush Hush)
Region	Date	Label	Edition(s)
Digital releases
Japan	2 October 2013	Maan	Standard
Japan	23 October 2013	Maan	Deluxe
CD releases
Japan	23 October 2013	Victor	Deluxe

== See also ==
- List of music released by Romanian artists that has charted in major music markets
