= Saxobeats =

- Cover artwork used to commercialize standard editions of Saxobeats in Europe

Studio album by Alexandra Stan
- Released: 29 August 2011
- Recorded: Maan Studio
- Genre: Hi-NRG; dance; Popcorn
- Length: 48:36
- Language: English; French
- Label: Play On
- Producer: Marcel Prodan; Andrei Nemirschi

Alexandra Stan albums chronology
Saxobeats (2011)	Cliché (Hush Hush) (2013)

Alternative cover
- Japanese edition cover

Singles from Saxobeats
- 1. "Lollipop (Param Pam Pam)" Released: late 2009; 2. "Mr. Saxobeat" Released: 12 September 2010; 3. "Get Back (ASAP)" Released: 28 March 2011; 4. "1.000.000" Released: 20 January 2012

Saxobeats is the debut studio album recorded by Romanian singer and songwriter Alexandra Stan, released on 29 August 2011 by Play On Records. It was mainly written and produced by Marcel Prodan and Andrei Nemirschi, who recorded it at their Maan Studio. They had previously discovered the singer at a karaoke bar and offered her a record deal with their own label, Maan Records. Same year she released a promotional single, "Show Me the Way", through the label which was later included on Saxobeats. The music on the album overall approaches genres of hi-NRG and dance music. "Lollipop (Param Pam Pam)" features a sample of American singer Fergie's 2006 single "Fergalicious". The record received mixed reviews from music reviewers, praising it for approaching a danceable style, but also criticizing its formulaic production.

Commercially, Saxobeats was moderately successful on European album charts, while also reaching number 15 in Japan. According to the Recording Industry Association of Japan (RIAJ), it sold more than 68,000 copies in that territory as of May 2012. To promote the album, Stan performed on various concert venues and released four tracks as singles. "Lollipop (Param Pam Pam)", the first one, was heavily broadcast in native Romania, while "Mr. Saxobeat" became a worldwide commercial success. The third release, "Get Back (ASAP)", was moderately successful on European charts, and "1.000.000", the last single, featured vocals from German–Zimbabwe rapper Carlprit.

== Background and development ==
In her teenage years, Alexandra Stan participated in various music-related contests, including the Mamaia Music Festival. In 2009, the singer was discovered by Romanian producers and songwriters Marcel Prodan and Andrei Nemirschi at a karaoke bar, who offered her a record deal with their own label, Maan Records. She also recorded a promotional single called "Show Me the Way" that year. Saxobeats, her debut studio album, was recorded at the producers' Maan Studio, with the singer recalling in an interview with Direct Lyrics prior to the record's release that it "was the best time of [her] life. [She] really enjoyed working with them and [she] had a lot of fun." Writing and production were both handled by Prodan, Nemirschi and Marcian Alin Soare. In the same interview, Stan further revealed that all songs on Saxobeats "are part of [her] life and they represent [her]."

== Release and artwork ==
In an interview prior to the record's release, Stan revealed that it is set to premiere in September 2011. To celebrate the release of Saxobeats, an event with the singer's friends, collaborators and journalists was held. A special website had also been launched to commercialize the album. Saxobeats was first released physically in France by Play On, following which it was digitally distributed in that country on 2 April 2012 by Play On/Jeff. While a deluxe edition premiered on 20 June 2012, the record was further released in September to Germany and Poland. In the United States, it was both physically and digitally distributed in late October 2011 by Ultra Records; the same label also released Saxobeats in Canada that month. The album premiered in Japan on 7 March 2012, with its respective deluxe edition being released one month later. On 22 October 2012, the record was finally distributed to the United Kingdom. In 2013, Saxobeats was re-released in Japan under the name Cliché (Hush Hush), featuring new singles "Lemonade" (2012), "Cliché (Hush Hush)" (2013) and "All My People" (2013).

Saxobeats was commercialized with three different covers shot by Andrei Nemirschi. For European standard releases, it featured Stan wearing a bob in front of a black-white backdrop, with one of her hands being attached to her head. In Japan, the release was accompanied by a photograph of the singer standing with headphones on her shoulders against a black background. All deluxe editions featured Stan leaning on a plastic mannequin, sporting a blue blouse along with various accessories on her hand.

== Composition and reception ==
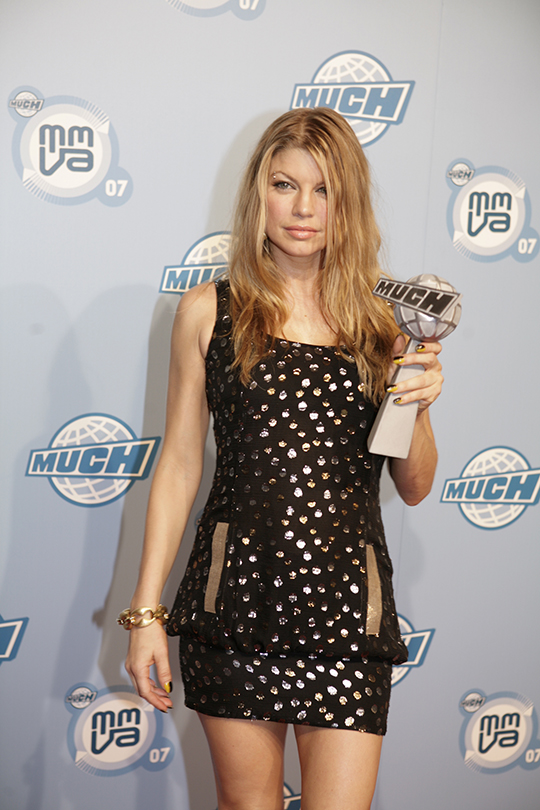
"Lollipop (Param Pam Pam)" contains elements from the Fergie (pictured) recording "Fergalicious" (2006).

AllMusic described Saxobeats as a hi-NRG and dance album, while labelling "Mr. Saxobeat", "Lollipop (Param Pam Pam)" and "Get Back (ASAP)" as "club sensations", and stating that "Bitter-Sweet" "Ting-Ting" and "1.000.000" are "equally addictive". In an interview, Stan confessed that Saxobeats is diverse and includes many genres. Eugen Baltaretu from Devorator Moden found many musical styles in the record, including electronic, house and eurodance. Mike Schiller Schiller of PopMatters regarded "Mr. Saxobeat" as containing "twinkly synths and techno beats" alongside a "ridiculously catchy saxophone loop", while labelling the material on Saxobeats as being of the dance-pop genre. He further praised "Ting-Ting" for incorporating "hints of Balkan folk music into the mix"; the song was described as having a French vibe to it by Yam Magazine. "Lollipop (Param Pam Pam)" features a sample from American singer Fergie's 2006 single "Fergalicious" (2006), with Stan confessing that the track is "club-friendly" alongside "funny lyrics". Musically, "1.000.000" is an R&B and pop song with hip hop beats in its instrumentation.

Professional ratings
Review scores
Source	Rating
AllMusic	3.5/5 stars
Mix1	7/8 stars
PopMatters	5/10 stars
Yam Magazine	3.5/5 stars

Upon its release, Saxobeats received mixed to positive reviews from music critics. Celeste Rhoads of AllMusic positively regarded Saxobeats and awarded it with a rating of 3.5 out of 5 stars. Similarly, German portal Mix1 gave it 7 stars out of 8. PopMatters's Schiller was more mixed towards the record, describing Stan as "the sort of young upstart pop diva that it's hard to hate, yet hard to take seriously." Continuing, he negatively pointed out that the name of the album was related to "Mr. Saxobeat", although "only around half of the eight original tracks here have any hint of saxophone", alongside criticizing the quality of the remixes on Saxobeats, which he overall awarded with 5 stars out of 10. Although Rodrigo of Yam Magazine was "instantly hooked" when hearing "Mr. Saxobeat", he stated in his review that the record's material followed the same structure. Along with criticizing the remixes, as well, he concluded, "Stan has room for improvement [...] making your debut with a repetitive album isn't a good thing."

== Commercial performance ==
Commercially, Saxobeats experienced moderate success on record charts. In Austria, it stayed three weeks on the Ö3 Austria Top 75 Longplay (Albums), peaking at number 25 on 23 September 2011. On Finnish and German charts, the record remained in the top 100 for one and two weeks respectively, reaching its highest position at numbers 27 and 29. Saxobeats was week-wise slightly more successful on France's SNEP chart, where it charted at number 76, and reached position 15 in Japan. On the respective Oricon chart, the record remained 40 weeks, and—according to the Recording Industry Association of Japan (RIAJ)—it sold 68,245 copies as of May 2012. In other European territories like Hungary and Switzerland, Saxobeats peaked at numbers 39 and 24, respectively; on the latter chart, it stayed six weeks in the top 100.

== Promotion ==
In order to promote the record, it was accompanied by several concert tours, with Stan also making an appearance for Romanian radio station Radio ZU. Four singles were released from Saxobeats. "Lollipop (Param Pam Pam)" was the first single released in late 2009 in native Romania, where it reached number 58 on the Romanian Top 100 aided by the radio airplay received. The song was accompanied by a low-budget music video, which was not received well by the audience. The next single from Saxobeat, "Mr. Saxobeat", was distributed on 12 September 2010, initially reaching number one in Romania for eight consecutive weeks. Subsequently, it became commercially acclaimed worldwide, topping the record charts in nine other countries: Austria, Denmark, Germany, Hungary, Israel, Italy, Slovakia, Switzerland and Turkey, The third single from the album, "Get Back (ASAP)" failed to reach the same success, although it reached the top 40 of many European charts. The recording's music video further acts as a continuation to that of "Mr. Saxobeat". "1.000.000", the last release of the album, was distributed in early 2012, and features vocals from German-Zimbabwean rapper Carlprit, following his involvement with Stan in a remix of "Mr. Saxobeat". Promoted by a clip that served to emphasis her image, the track commercially reached the top 40 in Italy and Romania. Saxobeats was further aided by the promotional singles "Show Me the Way" (2009), "Bitter Sweet" (2013), "Crazy" (2013), and "Ting-Ting" (2013).

== Track listing ==
Credits adapted from the liner notes of Saxobeats.

Saxobeats – International version (Note: All international issues of Saxobeats feature the same track list with different remixes added after the eighth track.)
No.	Title	Writer(s)	Producer(s)	Length
1.	"Mr. Saxobeat" (Radio Edit)	Marcel Prodan; Andrei Nemirschi	Prodan; Nemirschi	3:15
2.	"Ting-Ting"	Prodan; Nemirschi	Prodan; Nemirschi	3:56
3.	"Show Me the Way"	Prodan; Nemirschi	Prodan; Nemirschi	3:43
4.	"Lollipop (Param Pam Pam)"	Prodan; Nemirschi	Prodan; Nemirschi	3:55
5.	"Crazy"	Prodan; Nemirschi	Prodan; Nemirschi	3:28
6.	"Bitter-Sweet"	Prodan; Nemirschi	Prodan; Nemirschi	3:37
7.	"Get Back (ASAP)"	Prodan; Nemirschi	Prodan; Nemirschi	3:29
8.	"1.000.000" (featuring Carlprit)	Prodan; Nemirschi; Marcian Alin Soare	Prodan; Nemirschi	3:17
Total length:				48:36

== Charts ==
Chart performance for Saxobeats
Chart (2011–2012)	Peak position
Austrian Albums (Ö3 Austria)	25
Finnish Albums (Suomen virallinen lista)	27
French Albums (SNEP)	76
German Albums (Offizielle Top 100)	29
Hungarian Albums (MAHASZ)	39
Japanese Albums (Oricon)	15
Swiss Albums (Schweizer Hitparade)	24

== Release history ==
Release history and formats for Saxobeats
Region	Date	Format	Label	Edition(s)
France	29 August 2011	CD	Play On	Standard
France	2 April 2012	Digital download	Play On/Jeff	Standard
France	20 June 2012	CD	Mis	Deluxe
Germany	9 September 2011	Digital download	Sony	Standard
Poland	23 September 2011	CD	Universal	Standard
United States	18 October 2011	Digital download	Ultra	Standard
United States	24 October 2011	CD	Ultra	Standard
Canada	18 October 2011	Digital download	Ultra	Standard
Japan	7 March 2012	Digital download	Play On/Jeff	Standard
Japan	20 June 2012	Digital download	Play On/Jeff	Deluxe
United Kingdom	22 October 2012	Digital download	3Beat	Standard

== See also ==
- List of music released by Romanian artists that has charted in major music markets
