= Lemonade (Alexandra Stan song) =

Single by Alexandra Stan

from the album Cliché (Hush Hush)
- Released: 12 June 2012
- Genre: EDM; reggae-pop; dubstep
- Length: 3:30
- Label: MediaPro; Ultra; Columbia
- Songwriters: Marcel Prodan; Andrei Nemirschi
- Producers: Prodan; Nemirschi

Alexandra Stan singles chronology
| "1.000.000" (2012) | "Lemonade" (2012) | "Cliché (Hush Hush)" (2012) |

Music video
- Video on YouTube

"Lemonade" is a song recorded by Romanian singer and songwriter Alexandra Stan for her Japan-only reissue, Cliché (Hush Hush) (2013). It was released for radio airplay in Italy on 12 June 2012, followed by its digital release on 14 June 2012 through MediaPro Music in Romania and on 1 August 2012 in Japan. Written and produced by Marcel Prodan and Andrei Nemirschi, the single incorporates EDM, reggae-pop and dubstep into its composition; it makes use of harmonica and accordions. Upon its release, "Lemonade" was met with positive reviews from music critics, with them naming it "catchy", "fresh" and a highlight, while one of them foresaw it as having a strong radio performance. It also drew comparations to the works of Britney Spears, Kelis and Lady Gaga. At the Radio România Actualități Awards gala in 2013, the recording received a nomination for Radio România Junior.

An accompanying music video for the recording was posted onto YouTube on 4 June 2012; it was shot by Iulian Moga in Buftea, Romania, and portrays Stan walking through the city and being present at a block party. Commercially, "Lemonade" peaked on some European record charts, becoming a number-one hit in Bulgaria and reaching the top thirty in Romania, Italy, Japan and Slovakia. It was as well certified Gold by the Federation of the Italian Music Industry (FIMI) for selling 15,000 copies in Italy.

== Composition ==
"Lemonade"
A sample of "Lemonade", an EDM and reggae-pop recording incorporating a dubstep breakdown.

Winston Cook-Wilson from Inverse called the song an EDM, reggae and "sunny" pop recording featuring a "nonsensical" harmonica. Bradley Stern, writing for MuuMuse, named the genre of the track "Ace of Base-esque reggae-pop", while labeling its lyrics as "completely nonsense" and noticing the use of accordions. Furthermore, Stern pointed out a "stuttering" dubstep breakdown throughout "Lemonade", which, according to him, was inspired by Britney Spears' "Hold It Against Me" (2011). Jonathan Hamard from Pure Charts felt that the recording was of dance-pop genre, auguring "a major musical turn with reggae sounds".

Romanian website Urban.ro stated that the single was a mixture of 1990's music, Kelis' "Milkshake" (2003), Lady Gaga's "Eh, Eh (Nothing Else I Can Say) (2009) and some dubstep influences. The same portal also pointed out the change of Stan's artistry, with them explaining the departure from her previous popcorn styles. According to Stan's label, MediaPro Music, "Lemonade" portrays a positive lyrical message about enjoying life in every moment.

== Reception ==
Upon its release, "Lemonade" received generally positive reviews from music critics. Website Inverse's Winston Cook-Wilson praised the track for being complex. Cook-Wilson continued into saying that the recording "is just something to sip on a hot day – also, a way to cool down when thinking about a loved one". Kevin Apaza, writing for Direct Lyrics labelled the single "fresh and funky", confessing that he likes it better than its predecessors "1.000.000" (2012) and "Get Back (ASAP)" (2011). Furthermore, Apaza foreseed "Lemonade" as a club hit with the help of "a few killer remixes". MTV declared the song as being "catchy", while stating that "you'd be hard-pressed to turn down a glass of what Stan's serving this summer". Music channel Utv applauded the single, foreseeing it successful on radio. At the Radio România Actualități Awards gala in 2013, the recording received a nomination for Radio România Junior.

"Lemonade" debuted at number 74 on the Italian Singles Chart, with it eventually reaching its peak position at number 25. It was certified Gold by the Federation of the Italian Music Industry (FIMI) for selling 15,000 copies in that territory. The recording remained a number-one hit in Bulgaria, while peaking at number 70 in Czech Republic, number 38 in Hungary, number 18 in Slovakia and number 27 on the Japan Hot 100. On native Airplay 100, "Lemonade" managed to peak at number 22.

== Music video ==
Shot from the music video, with Stan walking down a street wearing a lemon-printed dress. Direct Lyrics compared this outfit to gipsy culture.

An accompanying music video for "Lemonade" was posted onto the YouTube channel of Stan's label, Maan Studio, on 4 June 2012 after it was previewed one day before. It was shot by Iulian Moga in April 2012 at the MediaPro Pictures studios in Buftea, Romania. The clip commences with Stan entering a kitchen wearing a red-white striped dress. Subsequently, she is portrayed cutting lemons and making lemonade, following which she makes a phone call and walks down the street sporting a lemon-printed yellow dress and smiling into the camera. Next, Stan is seen singing in front of a red car, flirting with a man, which is followed by the appearance of two police men. They enter a store and the singer is presented selling lemons in the street. Afterwards, the video switches from color to sepia, as she is present at a block party; it closes with Stan posing in front of a backdrop designed with different types of shoes.

Kevin Apaza from Direct Lyrics praised the clip, naming it one of her best works yet. He went on into calling the video "cute" and comparing one of Stan's outfits to gipsy culture. Urban.ro was positive towards the music video, stating that it "illustrates the single beautifully" and that they like "the colors, the styling, all". Los 40 Principales cited the clip in their list of Stan's best videos along with "Dance" (2014), "Cherry Pop" (2014), "Thanks for Leaving" (2014), "Cliché (Hush Hush)" (2012), "Get Back (ASAP)", "1.000.000" (2011), "Mr. Saxobeat" (2011), "Lollipop (Param Pam Pam)" (2009) and "All My People" (2013).

== Track listings ==
Digital single
| No. | Title | Length |
|---|---|---|
| 1. | "Lemonade" | 3:30 |

Digital remixes EP
| No. | Title | Length |
|---|---|---|
| 1. | "Lemonade (Da Brozz Remix)" | 5:05 |
| 2. | "Lemonade (Fedo Mora and Oki Doro Remix)" | 4:56 |
| 3. | "Lemonade (Rudeejay Remix)" | 5:50 |
| 4. | "Lemonade (Rudeejay Radio Edit)" | 3:03 |
| 5. | "Lemonade (Topakabana Remix)" | 4:20 |
| 6. | "Lemonade (Karmin Shiff and Marco Zardi Remix)" | 4:46 |

== Credits and personnel ==
Credits adapted from the liner notes of Cliché (Hush Hush).

Recording

- Recorded at Maan Studio in Constanța, Romania.

Technical and songwriting

- Andrei Nemirschi –songwriter, producer
- Marcel Prodan – songwriter, producer
- Alexandra Stan – lead vocals

== Charts and certifications ==
=== Weekly charts ===
| Chart (2012) | Peak position |
|---|---|
| Bulgaria Airplay (BAMP) | 1 |
| Czech Republic Airplay (ČNS IFPI) | 70 |
| Hungary (Dance Top 40) | 38 |
| Italy (FIMI) | 25 |
| Japan (Japan Hot 100) (Billboard) | 27 |
| Romania (Airplay 100) | 22 |
| Slovakia Airplay (ČNS IFPI) | 18 |

=== Year-end charts ===
| Chart (2012) | Peak position |
|---|---|
| Romania (Media Forest) | 64 |

=== Certifications ===
| Region | Certification | Certified units/sales |
|---|---|---|
| Italy (FIMI) | Gold | 15,000^{*} |
^{*} Sales figures based on certification alone.

== Release ==
=== Process ===
The track was first released for radio airplay in Italy on 12 June 2012, following which it was made available for digital download in Romania on 14 June 2012 through MediaPro Music. Subsequently, "Lemonade" was released in Italy through iTunes Store one day later, with a remixes EP being premiered in that country on 24 July 2012 by Vae Victis. From August to October 2012, the recording was released to Japan, Spain and the United States through Maan Studio, Blanco y Negro Music and Ultra Records, respectively.

=== History ===
| Country | Date | Format | Label |
|---|---|---|---|
| Italy | 12 June 2012 | Radio airplay | —N/a |
| Italy | 15 June 2012 | Digital single | Vae Victis |
| Italy | 24 July 2012 | Digital remixes EP | Vae Victis |
| Romania | 14 June 2012 | Digital single | MediaPro |
| Japan | 1 August 2012 | Digital single | Maan |
| Spain | 7 August 2012 | Digital single | Blanco y Negro |
| United States | 16 October 2012 | Digital single | Ultra & Columbia |

== See also ==
- List of music released by Romanian artists that has charted in major music markets
