= Cliché (Hush Hush) (song) =

Single by Alexandra Stan

from the album Cliché (Hush Hush)
- Released: 3 October 2012
- Recorded: Maan Studio
- Genre: Dance-pop; Eurodance
- Length: 3:23
- Label: MediaPro
- Songwriters: Andrei Nemirschi; Marcel Prodan
- Producers: Nemirschi; Prodan

Alexandra Stan singles chronology
"Lemonade" (2012)	"Cliché (Hush Hush)" (2012)	"All My People" (2013)

Music video
- "Cliché (Hush Hush)" on YouTube

"Cliché (Hush Hush)" is a song recorded by Romanian recording artist Alexandra Stan for her Japan-only reissue of the same name (2013). Written and produced by Marcel Prodan and Andrei Nemirschi, it was first released for digital download on 3 October 2012 in Romania through MediaPro. Described as a dance-pop track that features eurodance elements in its sound, "Cliché (Hush Hush)" discusses different themes of love. An accompanying music video for the single was posted onto YouTube on 27 September 2012, being filmed by Iulian Moga at Palatul Snagov. It was generally praised by music critics, with Los 40 Principales citing it under their list of Stan's best clips. Particularly, a scene of the video was compared to vampire movies for teenagers, while another one to 1970s film works. The track peaked at number 91 in native Romania, as well as at numbers 11 and 28 in Japan and Italy, respectively. It was promoted by several live performances, including a tour throughout the United States and an appearance at French music event Starlooor 2012.

== Composition and reception ==
"Cliché (Hush Hush)"
A 16-second sample of the track, a dance-pop song with Eurodance influences in its sound.

According to Romanian sources, "Cliché (Hush Hush)" is a "dynamic" dance-pop track that incorporates influences of Eurodance into its sound; its lyrics speak about love. About the message of the song, Stan confessed that it "shows love in different ways and portrays as well relationships between obvious couples, which fall into a certain pattern. Love can transform everyone and everything in the most wonderful and important thing in the universe". Alvaro from Spanish music website Popelera pointed out major differences between the dance style of the track and that of its predecessor, "Lemonade" (2012), while Alexandra Necula, writing for Romanian portal Info Music, drew comparisons with the Pussycat Dolls' single "Hush Hush; Hush Hush" (2009). Kevin Apaza of Direct Lyrics implied that Stan "[stepped] away from her 'signature' (very saxobeat) sound to test other 'dance' waters", and wrote that the song "ain't very catchy but [he likes] the pre and the main chorus. Plus, the song is super remixable, [he] can already imagine fist-pumping new versions."

== Music video ==
One scene of the video where Stan, wearing a red robe, is surrounded by dark-clothed people drew comparisons to vampire movies for teenagers.

An accompanying music video for the song was uploaded onto the YouTube channel of Stan's label, Maan Studio, on 27 September 2012, after teasing it on 19 September. The clip was filmed by Iulian Moga at Snagov Palace. It commences with Stan entering a party hall in sepia while being pictured by a photographer. Following her flirting with the man, she leaves the room and the video introduces to pool-party in normal color, where Stan dances along with fellow background dancers sporting a pink outfit. Next, the singer is shown in a dark hall, sitting on an old-fashioned couch. Following this, Stan is portrayed in a church, with her body and face being covered by a red robe; fellow black-clothed people surround her. Subsequently, scenes with the singer and her love interest from a hotel room are shown, after which the clip ends with the people from the church scene getting out of disguise and running through the hall in white lingerie, followed by Stan dancing around a fire after letting candles falling down at a date with her boyfriend.

Necula compared the opening scene of the video to 1970s films, while stating that some parts of the clip did not match with the song's message. She went on to compare the church scene to vampire films for teenagers; Necula stated that one of the outfits sported by Stan were inspired by S&M fetish. Apaza from Direct Lyrics stated that "her clip is like a mix of Paulina Rubio, Twilight and J.Lo's 'Dance Again' (the orgy scenes)." Showbiz.ro's Mia felt that the "80s vibe of the video coincided with the melodic line". Los 40 Principales cited the video as one of Stan's best clips ever.

== Live performances ==
To promote "Cliché (Hush Hush)", Stan embarked on a tour in the United States. She also provided live performances of the song throughout her concert tours that promoted the Japan-only reissue. Furthermore, Stan sang the song in a medley with "Mr. Saxobeat", "Get Back (ASAP)" and "Lemonade" at French event Starfloor 2012.

== Track listing ==
- Italian remixes EP
1. "Cliché (Hush Hush)" (Raf Marchesini Remix) – 3:35
2. "Cliché (Hush Hush)" (Raf Marchesini Remix Edit) – 6:15
3. "Cliché (Hush Hush)" (Da Brozz Remix) – 3:51
4. "Cliché (Hush Hush)" (Da Brozz Remix Edit) – 5:32
- Romanian digital download
1. "Cliché (Hush Hush)" – 3:23
- Italian digital download
1. "Cliché (Hush Hush)" (Radio Edit) – 3:23
2. "Cliché (Hush Hush)" (Maan Extended Version) – 4:25
- Italian digital download (acoustic version)
1. "Cliché (Hush Hush)" (Acoustic Version) – 3:22

== Credits and personnel ==
Credits adapted from the liner notes of Cliché (Hush Hush) and The Collection.

- Alexandra Stan – lead vocals
- Iulian Moga – director
- Andrei Nemirschi – songwriter, producer, photography
- Maan Studio – recording studio
- Marcel Prodan – songwriter, producer
- Iliaro Drago – artists and repertoire

== Charts ==
Chart (2012–13)	Peak position
Italy (FIMI)	28
Japan (Japan Hot 100) (Billboard)	11
Romania (Airplay 100)	91

== Release history ==
Release dates and formats for "Cliché (Hush Hush)"
Region	Date	Version	Format(s)	Label	Ref.
Romania	3 October 2012	Original	Digital download; streaming	MediaPro	
Italy	12 October 2012	Original	Digital download; streaming	Vae Victis	
Italy	19 October 2012	Original	Radio airplay	Ego	
Italy	23 November 2012	Remix EP	Digital download; streaming	Vae Victis	
Italy	11 December 2012	Acoustic	Digital download; streaming	Vae Victis	
Spain	6 November 2012	Original	Digital download; streaming	Blanco y Negro	

== See also ==
- List of music released by Romanian artists that has charted in major music markets
