= More 'N' More (I Love You) =

Single by Haiducii
- Released: 2005
- Recorded: 2005
- Genre: Electropop, Dance
- Length: 3:22
- Label: Universo Spa
- Songwriter(s): Gino Magurno
- Producer(s): Gino Magurno, Amerigo Provenzano

Haiducii singles chronology
"I Need a Boyfriend" (2005)	"More 'N' More (I Love You)" (2005)	"Boom Boom" (2007)

"More 'N' More (I Love You)" is Romanian artist Haiducii's fourth single, released in Italy in December 2005, and it is her second song in English. The song would be included into Haiducii's debut album, Paula Mitrache in Haiducii, released in 2008. The CD single contains two versions of the song, and four Dragostea Din Tei versions (two already released and two new remixes).

== Classification ==
The song reached the top ten in Italy, peaking at no. 8, and is Haiducii's second best-selling single after her first single, the cover version of "Dragostea Din Tei", released in 2004.

== Music video ==
Three months after its release in March 2006, a music video premiered to help promote the song, where Haiducii can be seen with her lover and other male dancers who are used as her puppets.

== Chart performance ==
Chart (2006)	Peak Position
Italy (FIMI)	8

== See also ==
- List of music released by Romanian artists that has charted in major music markets
