= 1.000.000 (song) =

2011 single by Alexandra Stan and Carlprit

Single by Alexandra Stan featuring Carlprit

from the album Saxobeats
- Released: 20 January 2012
- Genre: R&B; pop
- Length: 3:18
- Label: Vae Victis; E2
- Songwriters: Andrei Nemirschi; Marcel Prodan; Marcian Alin Soare
- Producers: Andrei Nemirschi; Marcel Prodan

Alexandra Stan singles chronology
"Get Back (ASAP)" (2011)	"1.000.000" (2012)	"Lemonade" (2012)

Carlprit singles chronology
"1234" (2011)	"1.000.000" (2012)	"Fiesta" (2012)

Music video
- Video on YouTube

"1.000.000" is a song recorded by Romanian recording artist Alexandra Stan for her debut studio album, Saxobeats (2011). Featuring the vocal collaboration of German-Zimbabwean rapper Carlprit, it was made available as a digital download on 22 February 2012 through Vae Victis and E2. The track was written by Andei Nemirschi, Marcel Prodan and Marcian Alin Soare, while being produced by Nemirschi and Prodan. Musically, "1.000.000" is an R&B and pop song which incorporates hip hop beats in its instrumentation; Stan repeats the word "million" over the chorus, which is reminiscent of Romanian band M&G's track "Milioane".

An accompanying music video for the single was uploaded on Prodan's YouTube channel on 22 December 2011, with it being filmed by Iulian Moga in Bucharest in the spawn of thirty hours. The visual portrays both Stan and Carlprit performing to the song in front of a graffiti backdrop and inside a mirrored room; one piece of the singer's clothing included a pair of shoes which was custom made in about forty-eight hours straight. With music critics generally praising "1.000.000", the recording experienced minor commercial success in Europe. It reached number thirteen on native Romanian Top 100, number ten in Israel and number thirty-four in Italy.

== Background and composition ==
After Carlprit's involvement with Stan in a remix of her 2011 single "Mr. Saxobeat", her manager and collaborator Marcel Prodan suggested that the pair work together in the future, which would result in "1.000.000". The song aired for the first time on French radio station Puls Radio. The track was written by Andrei Nemirschi, Prodan and Marcian Alin Soare, while being produced by Prodan and Nemirschi. "1.000.000" incorporates hip hop beats in its instrumentation, whilst Stan provides "warm" vocals. Carlprit opens the song by addressing the lyrics "You're one in a million" to Stan; she repeats the word "million" over the chorus, which is reminiscent of "Milioane" recorded by Romanian band M&G. Italian publication L'Altra Pagina described the single as an evolution in Stan's artistry, pointing out the absence of a saxophone in its composition unlike her previous material, and its style as being oriented to pop rather than her past dance works. According to Rodrigo of Yam-Magazine, the single is of the R&B and pop genre.

== Reception ==
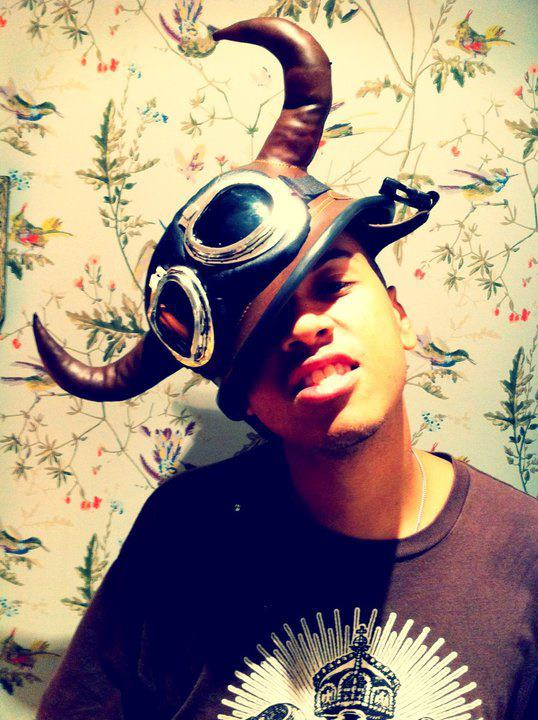
"1.000.000" featured the vocal collaboration of German-Zimbabwean rapper Carlprit.

The recording was generally acclaimed by music critics. Kevin Apaza, writing for Direct Lyrics, called the song "catchy and "super infectious", suggesting that "if promoted correctly '1.000.000' can slay European, and US charts." He went on praising its chorus for being "too cute", and labelling the recording as being "so simple, so generic, but so fire at the same time." Although Romanian music website Utv felt that the refrain's lyrics were "repetitive and monosyllabic", they acclaimed the track's rhythm and stated, "Moreover, Alexandra Stan accustomed us that once she releases a new single, this must be different from the previous ones." German magazine Klatsch–Tratsch said that "1.000.000" contains "gentle and sometimes quite very romantic tones", while AllMusic's Celeste Rhoads called the recording "addictive" during his review of Saxobeats. German portal Mix1 expected the single to become a hit and awarded it a score 6 out of 8. Music website Digijunkies praised Carlprit's contribution on "1.000.000", concluding that the recording is "supple on the dance floor and affectionate in the ear canal." In a mixed review for Saxobeats, Yam Magazine declared that the single "stands out for sounding different than the rest of the tracks [...] and Stan expresses herself well in the genre."

Commercially, "1.000.000" experienced minor success in Europe. On her native Romanian Top 100, it reached number thirteen on 15 January 2012. Furthermore, it managed to chart at number ten in Israel. The track managed to chart at number thirty-four in Italy in its sixth week, and at twenty-one in Spain.

== Music video ==
An accompanying music video for the song was uploaded onto the YouTube channel of Prodan's label, Maan Studio, on 22 December 2011. It was directed by Iulian Moga in Bucharest in the spawn of thirty hours, in over five different settings, with Stan wearing six outfits throughout the clip. About the clothing, she confessed during an interview that she chose to look "precious and glamorous mixed with something urban, R&B and hip-hop" after consulting with her stylist Andra Moga. One of her pieces included a pair of shoes which were custom made in a span of forty-eight hours. Premiering on MTV on 21 December 2011 at 12:00, the visual does not have a plot, serving to emphasis her image.

The clip opens with Carlprit riding a sparkling bicycle in front of a graffiti backdrop, with Stan sitting on a TV in front of him. Subsequently, they are both presented in a mirrored room. Until the track's breakdown is played, the two further dance to the song, following which the singer is portrayed captured in a cage and later laying on the floor covered by silver. The visual ends with the screen becoming dark and Stan looking into the camera. Website Direct Lyrics named the music video "cute", further explaining that "although nothing really happens, Alexandra just hangs around wearing different clothes in different scenes, she takes this opportunity to further strut her sexy figure." Los 40 Principales cited the visual for "1.000.000" as one of Stan's best clips ever.

== Track listing ==
Official versions (Note: This acts as a summary of all versions of the single found on its digital releases.)

1. 1.000.000 (feat. Carlprit) – 3:18
2. 1.000.000 (feat. Carlprit) [Rico Bernasconi Remix] – 5:29
3. 1.000.000 (feat. Carlprit) [Rico Bernasconi Remix Edit] – 2:38
4. 1.000.000 (feat. Carlprit) [Maan Studio Remix] – 4:29

== Credits and personnel ==
Credits adapted from the liner notes of Saxobeats and The Collection.

- Alexandra Stan – lead vocals
- Carlprit – featured artist
- Iulian Moga – director
- Andrei Nemirschi – composer, producer, photography
- Marcel Prodan – composer, producer
- Marcian Alin Soare – composer

== Charts ==
Chart performance for "1.000.000"
Chart (2012)	Peak position
Israel (Media Forest)	10
Italy (FIMI)	34
Romania (Romanian Top 100)	13
Spain Airplay (PROMUSICAE)	21

== Release history ==
Release history and formats for "1.000.000"
Territory	Format(s)	Date	Label
Italy	Digital single	20 January 2012	Vae Victis/ E2
Spain	Digital single	14 February 2012	Blanco y Negro
Japan	Digital single	21 March 2012	Play On/ Jeff
Denmark	Digital single	13 July 2012	Sony
Germany	Digital single	13 July 2012	Sony
Netherlands	Digital single	13 July 2012	Sony
Sweden	Digital single	13 July 2012	Sony
United Kingdom	CD single	—N/a	—N/a

== See also ==
- List of music released by Romanian artists that has charted in major music markets
