= List of music released by Romanian artists that has charted in major music markets =

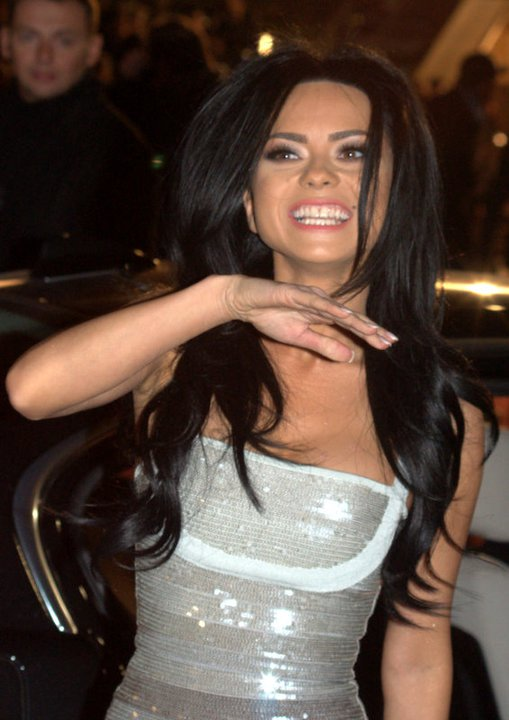
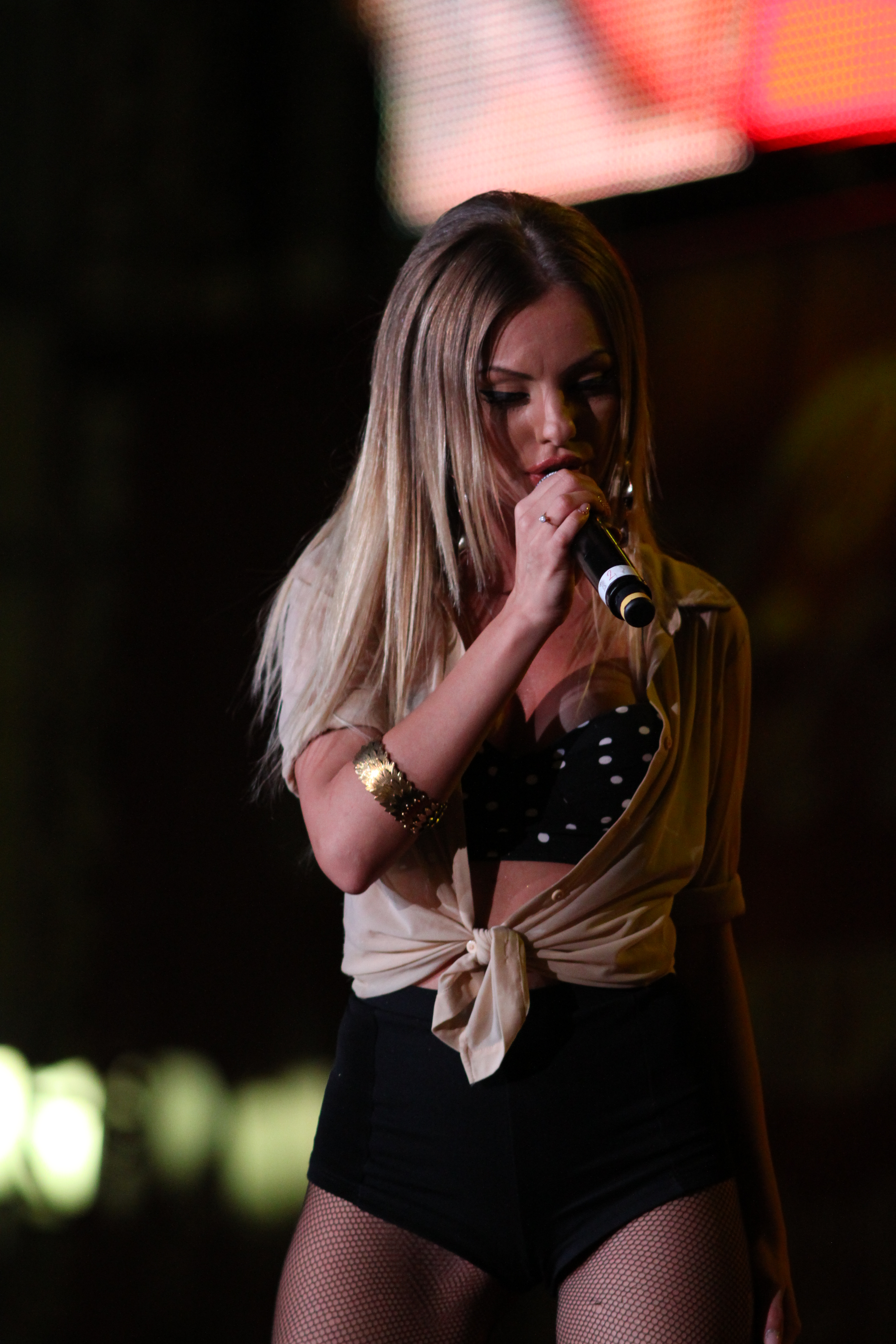
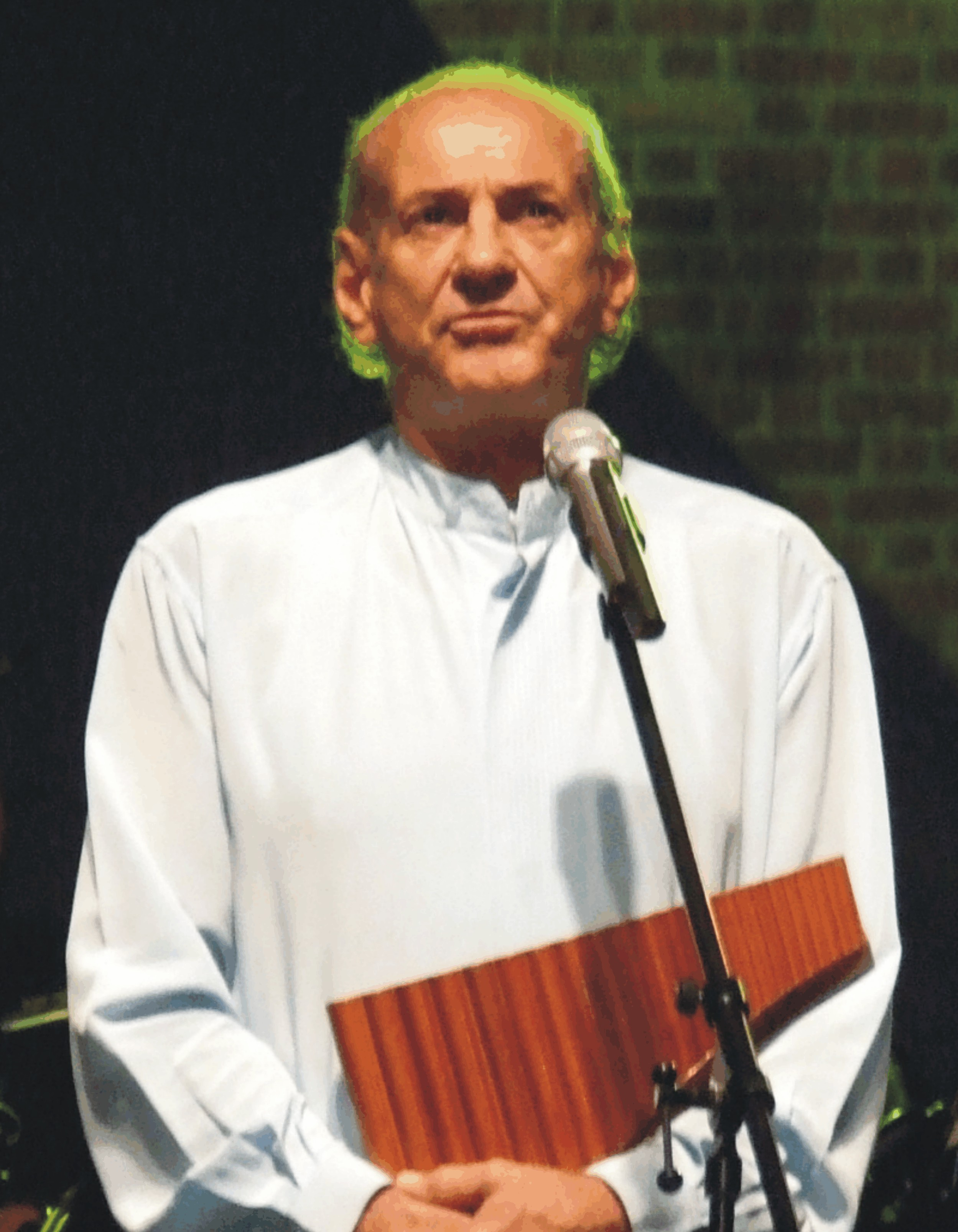
Inna (left), Alexandra Stan (middle) and Gheorghe Zamfir (right) are among the Romanian artists with the most charted or certified releases in the world's largest music markets.

Since the 1970s, songs and albums released by Romanian (Note: This article lists all charting releases, where there is at least one Romanian artist or act credited among the lead or featured artist(s). Music by Moldovan artists is not included, although songs such as the worldwide hit "Dragostea din tei" (2003) performed in Romanian by group O-Zone are often wrongfully referred to as being of Romanian origin. Artists that were born Romanian, but are more widely associated with another country―such as German musicians Peter Maffay, and Miss Platnum—or artists like German singer Linda Teodosiu that are only half-Romanian, are also not taken into consideration.) artists have charted and received certifications in the world's largest music markets. (Note: The International Federation of the Phonographic Industry (IFPI) has annually published the ten largest recorded music markets. This list takes into consideration the countries that have made the most appearances on the IFPI reports throughout the years.) The first Romanian artist to chart in such markets was the nai player Gheorghe Zamfir. His studio albums Music by Candlelight (1978) and Traumland der Panflöte (1979) peaked at number two in the Netherlands and Germany, respectively, while several of his other records released in the 1980s were certified multiple times platinum by Music Canada. Zamfir's singles "Light of Experience (Doina de jale)" and "The Lonely Shepherd" were also successful in some regions. In the late 1990s and early 2000s, soprano opera singer Angela Gheorghiu charted multiple albums on the US Billboard Classical Albums chart and in European countries. The early 2000s saw twin duo the Cheeky Girls scoring four top ten hits on the UK Singles Chart, with "Cheeky Song (Touch My Bum)" (2002) peaking at number two and being awarded gold by the British Phonographic Industry (BPI).

Singer Haiducii reached the top five of the charts in France, Germany, Italy, the Netherlands and Spain with "Dragostea din tei" (2003), a cover of the song of the same name by Moldovan group O-Zone. She went on to have two more top ten hits in Italy in 2004 at around the same time as the group Akcent experienced moderate success in some European countries with their single "Kylie" (2005). Inna released several charting singles from her debut studio album Hot (2009), most notably its lead single of the same name in 2008, which reached number one in Spain and the top ten in France, the Netherlands and the United Kingdom. It was one of the first hits of the popcorn genre, a Romanian style of dance music created in the late 2000s which established itself as part of the international mainstream over the course of the next few years. Other notable popcorn songs are "Stereo Love" (2009) by Edward Maya and Vika Jigulina, and "Mr. Saxobeat" (2010) by Alexandra Stan, which are two of the most successful songs of Romanian origin. Apart from reaching high peak positions and attaining certifications in almost every major music market, "Stereo Love" is the only documented Romanian song to chart in Brazil (number eight), as well as the highest Romanian peak in Canada (number ten in an alternative version released with Canadian singer Mia Martina) and the United States (number 16), while "Mr. Saxobeat" is the only charting Romanian song in Australia (number 19) and the highest-charting release in Japan (number nine).

Throughout the remainder of the 2010s, Inna and Alexandra Stan released other commercially successful singles, such as "Sun Is Up" (2010) and "Get Back (ASAP)" (2011), respectively. Inna also scored two top ten hits in Spain with "More than Friends" (2013) and "Cola Song" (2014), while Alexandra Stan charted several top 40 albums and singles in Japan—Saxobeats (2011), "Lemonade" (2012), "Cliché (Hush Hush)" (2012), "Dance" (2014), Unlocked (2014) and Alesta (2016). "Musica" (2011) by the group Fly Project was a top ten hit in Italy, receiving a double platinum certification from Federazione Industria Musicale Italiana (FIMI). Their 2013 single "Toca-Toca" was awarded gold in the same region and peaked at number ten in France. Other notable Romanian successes in the 2010s include "Zalele" (2013) by Claudia and Asu, which peaked at number five in Italy, and "I Need Your Love" (2015) featuring Romanian musician Costi, which reached the top 40 in the Netherlands, Spain and the United Kingdom, and peaked at number 66 on the Billboard Hot 100.

== Charted releases ==
Key
◁	Indicates an artist not born Romanian
†	Indicates a song that has participated in the Eurovision Song Contest

=== Albums ===
List of charting albums, with selected chart positions and certifications
Year	Title	Artist	Peak chart positions								Certifications
Year	Title	Artist	CAN	FRA	GER (Note: West Germany until 1990)	JPN	NLD	SPA	UK	US Class.	Certifications
1974	Flûtes de pan	Gheorghe Zamfir	—	—	36	—	—	—	—	—	
1978	Music by Candlelight	Gheorghe Zamfir and Harry van Hoof◁	—	—	—	—	2	—	—	—	NVPI: Platinum
1979	Traumland der Panflöte	Gheorghe Zamfir	—	—	2	—	—	—	—	—	BVMI: Gold
1980	Grands thèmes classiques / Classics by Candlelight	Gheorghe Zamfir and Harry van Hoof◁	—	—	—	—	15	—	—	—	
1980	The Lonely Shepherd	Gheorghe Zamfir	—	—	—	—	—	—	—	—	MC: 5× Platinum
1980	Solitude	Gheorghe Zamfir	—	—	—	—	—	—	—	—	MC: 2× Platinum
1982	Romance	Gheorghe Zamfir	63	—	—	—	—	—	—	—	MC: 2× Platinum
1982	Tranquility	Gheorghe Zamfir	—	—	—	—	—	—	—	—	MC: 3× Platinum
1983	Childhood Dreams	Gheorghe Zamfir	65	—	—	—	—	—	—	—	MC: Platinum
1984	Rhapsody	Gheorghe Zamfir	—	—	—	—	—	—	—	—	MC: Gold
1984	The Magic of Zamfir	Gheorghe Zamfir	—	—	—	—	—	—	—	—	MC: Platinum
1984	A Christmas Portrait	Gheorghe Zamfir	—	—	—	—	—	—	—	—	MC: Gold
1985	Fantasy	Gheorghe Zamfir	—	—	—	—	—	—	—	—	MC: Gold
1986	Harmony	Gheorghe Zamfir	—	—	—	—	—	—	—	—	MC: Gold
1987	Encore!	Gheorghe Zamfir	—	—	—	—	—	—	—	—	MC: Gold
1996	Duets & Arias	Roberto Alagna◁ and Angela Gheorghiu	—	—	—	—	—	—	—	6	
1997	La rondine	Roberto Alagna◁ and Angela Gheorghiu	—	—	—	—	—	—	—	32	
1998	Gounod: Romeo et Juliet	Roberto Alagna◁ and Angela Gheorghiu	—	—	—	—	—	—	—	38	
1999	Intemporel	Gheorghe Zamfir	—	14	—	—	—	—	—	—	
2000	Feeling of Romance	Gheorghe Zamfir	—	—	79	—	—	—	—	—	
2001	Tosca	Angela Gheorghiu, Roberto Alagna◁ and Ruggero Raimondi◁	—	89	—	—	—	—	—	—	
2003	PartyTime	The Cheeky Girls	—	—	—	—	—	—	14	—	
2004	Puccini	Angela Gheorghiu	—	69	—	—	16	—	—	11	
2004	Diva	Angela Gheorghiu	—	—	—	—	—	—	—	21	
2008	Spirit of the Andes	Gheorghe Zamfir	—	—	—	—	—	—	31	—	
2009	Madama Butterfly	Angela Gheorghiu	—	143	—	—	—	—	—	—	
2009	Hot	Inna	—	9	—	—	68	77	32	—	SNEP: Platinum
2011	Saxobeats	Alexandra Stan	—	76	29	15	—	—	—	—	
2011	Homage to Maria Callas – Favourite Opera Arias	Angela Gheorghiu	—	124	—	—	—	—	—	—	
2011	I Am the Club Rocker	Inna	—	23	—	45	—	—	—	—	
2013	Cliché (Hush Hush)	Alexandra Stan	—	—	—	53	—	—	—	—	
2013	Party Never Ends	Inna	—	—	—	88 (Note: The Japan-only deluxe edition, released separately as Party Never Ends 2, peaked at number 152.)	—	—	—	—	
2014	Unlocked	Alexandra Stan	—	—	—	21	—	—	—	—	
2015	Inna	Inna	—	—	—	157 (Note: This is the peak position for the Japan-only version of the album, titled Body and the Sun.)	—	—	—	—	
2016	Alesta	Alexandra Stan	—	—	—	34	—	—	—	—	
2018	Mami	Alexandra Stan	—	—	—	119	—	—	—	—	
2018	The Best	Alexandra Stan	—	—	—	131	—	—	—	—	
2018	10 ans des hits!	Inna	—	154	—	—	—	—	—	—	
2022	Champagne Problems	Inna	—	—	— (Note: Champagne Problems did not chart on the German Albums Chart, but reached number 81 on the German Downloads Chart.)	—	—	—	— (Note: Champagne Problems did not chart on the UK Albums Chart, but reached number 72 on the UK Album Downloads Chart.)	—	
"—" denotes an album that did not chart or was not released in that territory.

=== Songs ===
List of charting songs, with selected chart positions and certifications
Year	Title	Artist	Peak chart positions											Certifications
Year	Title	Artist	AUS	BRA	CAN	FRA	GER	ITA	JPN	NLD	SPA	UK	US	Certifications
1976	"Light of Experience (Doina de jale)"	Gheorghe Zamfir	—	—	—	—	―	—	—	22	—	4	—	
1977	"The Lonely Shepherd"	James Last◁ and Gheorghe Zamfir	—	—	—	—	22	—	—	5	—	—	—	
1982	"Blue Navajo"	Gheorghe Zamfir	—	—	— (Note: "Blue Navajo" did not chart on the main RPM singles chart, but peaked at number three on the magazine's adult contemporary chart.)	—	—	—	—	—	—	—	—	
2002	"Cheeky Song (Touch My Bum)"	The Cheeky Girls	—	—	—	19	52	—	—	4	—	2	—	BPI: Gold
2003	"Take Your Shoes Off"	The Cheeky Girls	—	—	—	—	—	—	—	—	—	3	—	
2003	"Hooray Hooray (It's a Cheeky Holiday)"	The Cheeky Girls	—	—	—	—	—	—	—	—	—	3	—	
2003	"Have a Cheeky Christmas"	The Cheeky Girls	—	—	—	—	—	—	—	—	—	10	—	
2003	"Dragostea din tei"	Haiducii	—	—	—	2	2	1	—	4	4	—	— (Note: Haiducii's version of "Dragostea din tei" did not chart on the Billboard Hot 100, but reached number four on the magazine's Dance Singles Sales chart.)	SNEP: Gold
2003	"Hip Hop Jam"	Indiggo	—	—	—	—	57	—	—	—	—	—	—	
2004	"Cheeky Flamenco"	The Cheeky Girls	—	—	—	—	—	—	—	—	—	29	—	
2004	"Boys and Girls (Xmas Time Love)"	The Cheeky Girls	—	—	—	—	—	—	—	—	—	50	—	
2004	"Nara Nara Na Na (Mne s Toboy Horosho)"	Haiducii	—	—	—	—	—	5	—	—	—	—	—	
2004	"More 'N' More (I Love You)"	Haiducii	—	—	—	—	—	8	—	—	—	—	—	
2005	"Kylie"	Akcent	—	—	—	21	91	—	—	4	—	—	—	
2005	"Raisa"	Fly Project	—	—	—	51	—	—	—	—	—	—	—	
2006	"Jokero"	Akcent	—	—	—	—	—	—	—	27	—	—	—	
2006	"Give Me 2Nite"	Crush and Alexandra	—	—	—	—	—	—	—	58	—	—	—	
2006	"Be My Boyfriend"	Indiggo	—	—	—	—	89	—	—	—	—	—	—	
2007	"Angels (Love Is the Answer)"	Morandi	—	—	—	16	—	—	—	—	—	—	—	
2008	"When You Leave (Numa Numa)"	Alina	—	—	—	—	—	—	—	—	—	—	— (Note: "When You Leave (Numa Numa)" did not chart on the Billboard Hot 100, but reached number six on the magazine's Hot Dance Airplay chart.)	
2008	"I'll Do You Like a Truck"	Geo Da Silva	—	—	—	—	—	—	—	37	—	—	—	
2008	"Hot"	Inna	—	—	97	6	80	33	—	4	1	6	— (Note: "Hot" did not chart on the Billboard Hot 100, but reached number one on the magazine's Dance/Mix Show Airplay chart.)	BPI: Silver; FIMI: Gold; PROMUSICAE: Platinum
2009	"Déjà Vu"	Bob Taylor and Inna	—	—	—	6	—	—	—	9	15	60	—	NVPI: Gold
2009	"I Can Feel"	David Deejay featuring Ela Rose	—	—	—	—	—	—	—	91	—	—	—	
2009	"So Bizarre"	David Deejay featuring Dony	—	—	—	—	—	—	—	100	—	—	—	
2009	"Stereo Love"	Edward Maya featuring Vika Jigulina◁ or with Mia Martina◁	—	8	10 (Note: The version of "Stereo Love" with Mia Martina reached number ten on the Canadian Singles Chart, while the version with Vika Jigulina peaked at number 19.)	1	4	4	—	5	1	4	16	BPI: 2× Platinum; BVMI: 2× Platinum; FIMI: 2× Platinum; MC: 3× Platinum (Note: This is the certification for the Mia Martina remix. The original version of "Stereo Love" was certified double platinum in Canada.); PROMUSICAE: 2× Platinum; RIAA: Platinum
2009	"This Is My Life"	Edward Maya featuring Vika Jigulina◁	—	—	—	2	—	—	—	42	—	— (Note: "This Is My Life" did not chart on the UK singles chart, but reached number 36 on the UK Dance Singles Chart.)	—	
2009	"Love"	Inna	—	—	—	—	—	—	—	31	31	—	—	
2009	"Amazing"	Inna	—	—	—	2	36	95	—	23	—	14	—	
2009	"Tyalee"	Sahara (Note: Sahara is a duo consisting of Romanian musician Costi Ioniță and Bulgarian singer Andrea.)	—	—	—	—	—	—	—	47	—	—	—	
2009	"A Beautiful Day"	Tom Boxer featuring Jay	—	—	—	—	—	—	—	—	34	—	—	
2010	"Mr. Saxobeat"	Alexandra Stan	19	—	25	6	1	1	9	4	3	3	21	ARIA: 2× Platinum; BPI: 2× Platinum; BVMI: 5× Gold; FIMI: 4× Platinum; MC: Platinum; PROMUSICAE: Gold; RIAA: Platinum; RIAJ: Platinum
2010	"I Wanna"	Bob Sinclar◁ and Sahara featuring Shaggy◁	—	—	—	—	87	—	—	84	—	—	—	
2010	"Disco Romancing"	Elena	—	—	—	—	—	—	—	59	—	—	—	
2010	"Midnight Sun"	Elena	—	—	—	—	—	—	—	21	—	—	—	
2010	"10 Minutes"	Inna featuring Play & Win	—	—	—	8	—	—	—	76	—	—	—	
2010	"Sun Is Up"	Inna	—	—	—	2	26	30	—	7	22	15	— (Note: "Sun Is Up" did not chart on the Billboard Hot 100, but reached number four on the magazine's Dance/Mix Show Airplay chart.)	BPI: Gold; FIMI: Gold
2010	"Playing with Fire"†	Paula Seling and Ovi	—	—	—	—	—	—	—	—	—	200	—	
2010	"Lonely Heart"	Radio Killer	—	—	—	37	—	—	—	—	—	—	—	
2011	"Get Back (ASAP)"	Alexandra Stan	—	—	—	19	73 (Note: In Germany, "Get Back (ASAP)" charted together with "Mr. Saxobeat".)	24	—	26	25	56	—	
2011	"Tell Me Why"	Amna	—	—	—	—	—	—	—	—	29	—	—	
2011	"I Need You More"	Crush and Alexandra featuring Leslie◁	—	—	—	54	—	—	—	—	—	—	—	
2011	"Never Be Alone"	Deepside Deejays	—	—	—	—	—	99	—	—	—	—	—	
2011	"Hot Girls"	Dony and Elena	—	—	—	—	91	—	—	—	—	—	—	
2011	"Your Captain Tonight"	Elena	—	—	—	—	—	—	—	95	—	—	—	
2011	"Musica"	Fly Project	—	—	—	90	—	6	—	—	—	—	—	FIMI: 2× Platinum
2011	"Club Rocker"	Inna featuring Flo Rida◁	—	—	—	32 (Note: The solo version of "Club Rocker" charted in France.)	55	89	55	79	—	—	—	
2011	"Un Momento"	Inna featuring Juan Magán◁	—	—	—	42	—	88	—	98	46	—	—	
2011	"Ya BB"	Play & Win	—	—	—	69	—	87	—	—	—	—	—	
2011	"All My People"	Sasha Lopez◁ and Andreea D featuring Broono◁	—	—	41	—	42	—	—	—	30	—	—	MC: Gold
2011	"Deep in Love"	Tom Boxer and Morena featuring J Warner◁	—	—	—	—	—	37	—	—	—	—	—	FIMI: Platinum
2012	"1.000.000"	Alexandra Stan featuring Carlprit◁	—	—	—	—	—	34	—	—	— (Note: "1.000.000" did not chart on the Spanish singles chart, but reached number 21 on the Spanish radio airplay chart.)	—	—	
2012	"Lemonade"	Alexandra Stan	—	—	—	—	—	25	27	—	—	—	—	FIMI: Gold
2012	"Cliché (Hush Hush)"	Alexandra Stan	—	—	—	—	—	28	11	—	—	—	—	
2012	"Back In My Life"	Fly Project	—	—	—	—	—	43	—	—	—	—	—	
2012	"Caliente"	Inna	—	—	—	—	—	99	—	—	—	—	—	
2012	"Crazy Sexy Wild"	Inna	—	—	—	—	—	—	49	—	—	—	—	
2012	"Ok"	Inna	—	—	—	185	—	—	—	—	—	—	—	
2012	"Zaleilah"	Mandinga	—	—	—	—	92	—	—	—	—	— (Note: "Zaleilah" did not chart on the UK singles chart, but reached number 31 on the UK Independent Singles Chart.)	—	
2013	"All My People"	Alexandra Stan vs. Manilla Maniacs	—	—	—	—	—	55	50	—	—	—	—	
2013	"Zalele"	Claudia and Asu	—	—	—	—	—	5	—	—	—	—	—	FIMI: Platinum
2013	"Toca-Toca"	Fly Project	—	—	—	10	—	36	—	—	17	—	—	FIMI: Gold; PROMUSICAE: Platinum
2013	"Baby, It's OK"	Follow Your Instinct◁ featuring Alexandra Stan	—	—	—	—	17	—	—	—	—	—	—	
2013	"More than Friends"	Inna featuring Daddy Yankee◁	—	—	—	92	—	52	—	—	7	—	—	PROMUSICAE: Gold
2013	"In Your Eyes"	Inna featuring Yandel◁	—	—	—	—	—	—	—	—	31	—	—	
2013	"Portilla de Bobo"	LoL Deejays◁ vs. Minelli and Follow Your Instinct◁	—	—	—	52	—	—	—	—	—	—	—	
2014	"Thanks for Leaving"	Alexandra Stan	—	—	—	—	—	83	—	—	—	—	—	
2014	"Cherry Pop"	Alexandra Stan	—	—	—	—	—	—	64	—	—	—	—	
2014	"Dance"	Alexandra Stan	—	—	—	—	—	—	25	—	—	—	—	
2014	"Mamma Mia (He's Italiano)"	Elena	—	—	—	—	—	—	—	—	47	—	—	
2014	"Cola Song"	Inna featuring J Balvin◁	—	—	—	—	77	93	—	—	8	—	—	PROMUSICAE: Platinum
2014	"Miracle"†	Paula Seling and Ovi	—	—	—	—	—	—	—	—	—	174	—	
2015	"Red Lips"	Aggro Santos◁ featuring Andreea Bănică	—	—	—	—	—	—	—	—	—	—	— (Note: "Red Lips" did not chart on the Billboard Hot 100, but reached number 13 on the magazine's Dance Club Songs chart.)	
2015	"We Wanna"	Alexandra Stan and Inna featuring Daddy Yankee◁	—	—	—	—	—	60	72	—	83	—	—	FIMI: Gold
2015	"I Need Your Love"	Shaggy◁ featuring Mohombi◁, Faydee◁ and Costi	—	—	74	147	91	—	—	10	25	36	66	BPI: Silver; MC: Gold; PROMUSICAE: Gold; RIAA: Gold
2016	"Balans"	Alexandra Stan featuring Mohombi◁	—	—	—	—	—	—	— (Note: "Balans" did not chart on the Billboard Japan Hot 100, but reached number 32 on the Billboard Japan Radio Songs chart.)	—	—	—	—	
2016	"Love on Repeat"	Dave Ramone◁ featuring Minelli	—	—	—	—	87	—	—	—	—	—	—	
2017	"Ruleta"	Inna featuring Erik	—	—	—	—	—	—	—	—	45	—	—	
2017	"Yodel It!"†	Ilinca and Alex Florea	—	—	—	—	93	—	—	90	—	— (Note: "Yodel It!" did not chart on the UK singles chart, but reached number 44 on the UK singles downloads chart and number 14 on the UK independent chart.)	—	
2018	"Miami"	Manuel Riva featuring Alexandra Stan	—	—	—	—	—	—	—	—	—	—	— (Note: "Miami" did not chart on the Billboard Hot 100, but reached number ten on the magazine's Dance Club Songs chart and number 44 on the Hot Dance/Electronic Songs chart.)	
2021	"It Don't Matter"	Alok◁, Sofi Tukker◁ and Inna	—	—	—	—	—	—	—	—	—	—	— (Note: "It Don't Matter" did not chart on the Billboard Hot 100, but reached number 27 on the magazine's Hot Dance/Electronic Songs chart.)	PMB: Platinum
2021	"Summer's Not Ready"	Flo Rida◁ featuring Inna and Timmy Trumpet◁	—	—	—	—	—	—	—	—	—	—	— (Note: "Summer's Not Ready" did not chart on the Billboard Hot 100, but reached number 35 on the magazine's Hot Dance/Electronic Songs chart.)	
2021	"Up"	Inna featuring Sean Paul◁	—	—	—	125	— (Note: "Up" did not chart on the German Singles Chart, but reached number 77 on the German Downloads Chart.)	—	—	—	—	—	—	
2021	"Rampampam"	Minelli	—	—	—	—	— (Note: "Rampampam" did not chart on the German Singles Chart, but reached number 77 on the German Downloads Chart.)	—	—	—	—	—	—	SNEP: Gold
2022	"Redrum"	Sorana and David Guetta◁	—	—	—	—	—	—	—	71	—	—	— (Note: "Redrum" did not chart on the Billboard Hot 100, but reached number 40 on the Hot Dance/Electronic Songs chart.)	
2022	"Llámame"†	Wrs	—	—	—	—	—	—	—	—	91	— (Note: "Llámame" did not chart on the UK singles chart, but reached number 59 on the UK Singles Downloads Chart.)	—	
2023	"Rock My Body"	Inna, R3hab◁ and Sash!◁	—	—	—	32	—	—	—	21	—	—	—	SNEP: Platinum
2024	"Queen of My Castle"	Kris Kross Amsterdam◁ and Inna	—	—	—	74	—	—	—	32	—	—	—	NVPI: Gold; SNEP: Gold
2025	"Don't Leave (Kylie)"	Akcent, Sera◁ and Misha Miller◁	—	—	—	—	—	—	—	— (Note: "Don't Leave (Kylie)" did not chart on the Dutch Single Top 100, but reached number 25 on the Dutch Single Tip chart.)	—	—	—	
2026	"Choke Me"†	Alexandra Căpitănescu	—	—	—	—	—	—	—	—	—	— (Note: "Choke Me" did not chart on the UK singles chart, but reached number 27 on the UK singles sales chart and number 14 on the UK Rock & Metal Singles Chart.)	—	
"—" denotes a recording that did not chart or was not released in that territory.

== See also ==
- Music of Romania
- List of certified albums in Romania
- Romanian record charts
- List of music released by Moldovan artists that has charted in major music markets
