= Haiducii =

Romanian singer and model (born 1971)

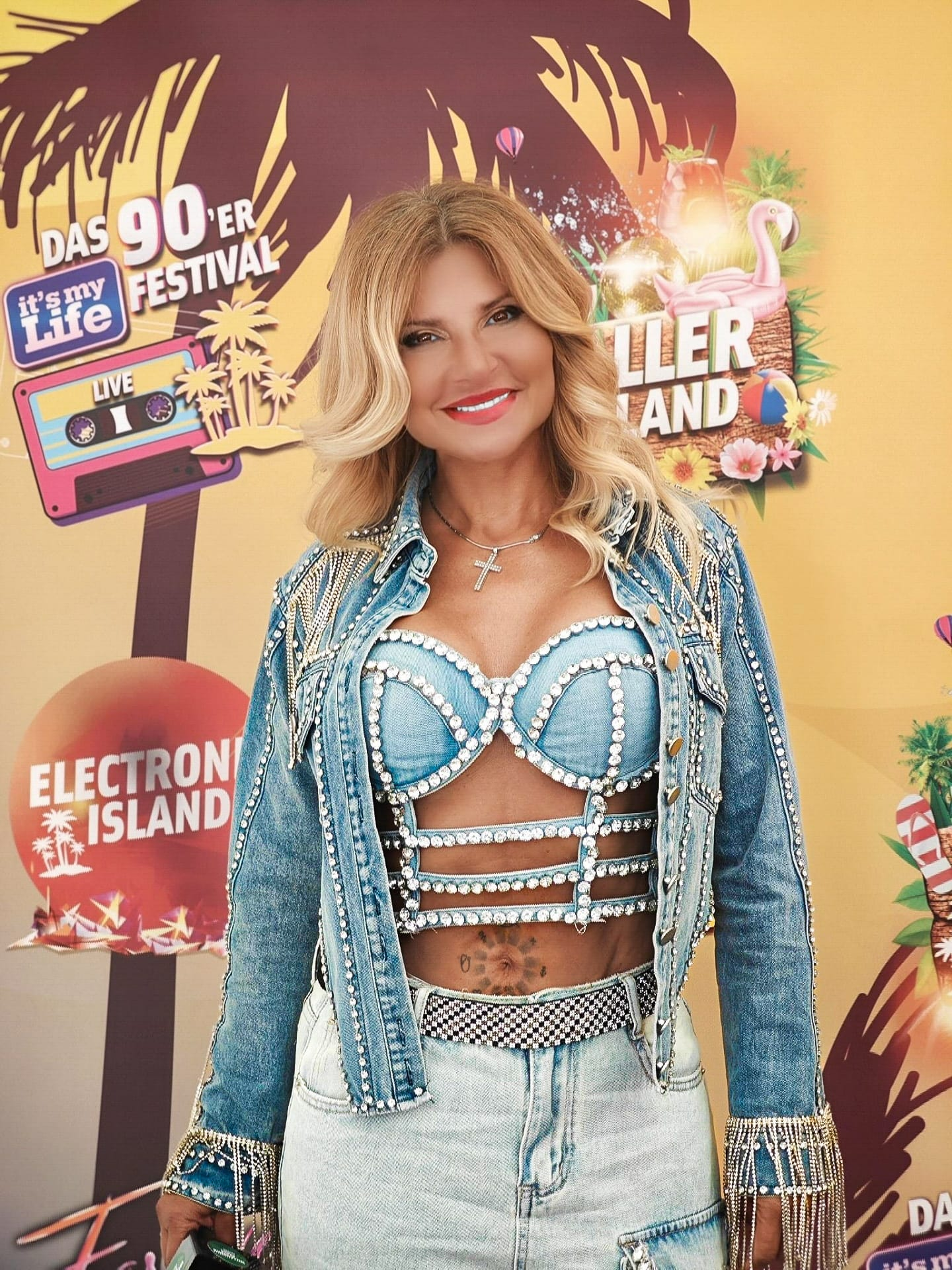
- Haiducii in 2025

Background information
- Also known as: Haiducii
- Born: Paula Monica Mitrache; 14 June 1971 (age 54); Bucharest, Romania
- Origin: Romanian
- Genres: Pop; dance; future rave; Europop; trance
- Occupations: Singer; model
- Instrument: Vocals
- Years active: 2000–present
- Labels: Universo Spa (2004–present); Warner Music Italy (2023–present)

Paula Monica Mitrache (born 14 June 1971), known by the stage name Haiducii (Romanian pronunciation: [hajˈdutʃij]), is a Romanian singer and model. Her first single, "Dragostea din tei", was released in 2004, which is a cover of O-Zone's homonymous single of the previous year; commercially, it reached widespread success, reaching no. 1 in Austria, Italy, Portugal and Sweden, as well as the top ten in eight other countries, and it was also certified Gold and Platinum in several other territories.

In late 2004, Haiducii released another song, "Mne s Toboy Horosho", cover of the homonymous 2003 single of the Russian band Ruki Vverh, and in late 2005 another one, "More 'N' More (I Love You)": these two songs managed to hit the chart, reaching no. 5 and 8 in Italy, respectively. The singer's debut album, Paula Mitrache in Haiducii, followed in 2008 and included these first songs that evolved into hits.

She has Italian citizenship.

== Discography ==
=== Studio albums ===
List of studio albums, showing details
Title	Album details
Paula Mitrache in Haiducii	Released: 2008; Label: Universo Spa; Format: Digital download

=== Singles ===
List of singles, with selected chart positions and certifications
Title	Year	Peak chart positions										Certifications	Album
Title	Year	AUT	DEN	FRA	GER	ITA	NED	NOR	SWE	SWI	US Sales	Certifications	Album
"Dragostea din tei"	2004	1	7	2	2	1	4	4	1	2	60	IFPI AUT: Gold; GLF: Gold; SNEP: Silver	Paula Mitrache in Haiducii
"Mne s Toboy Horosho"	2004	33	—	—	—	5	—	—	—	—	—		Paula Mitrache in Haiducii
"I Need a Boyfriend"	2005	—	—	—	—	—	—	—	—	—	—		Paula Mitrache in Haiducii
"More 'N' More (I Love You)"	2005	—	—	—	—	8	—	—	—	—	—		Paula Mitrache in Haiducii
"Boom Boom"	2007	—	—	—	—	—	—	—	—	—	—		Non-album singles
"Doobie Doobie"	2009	—	—	—	—	—	—	—	—	—	—		Non-album singles
"Mne Uzhe"	2009	—	—	—	—	—	—	—	—	—	—		Non-album singles
"Parliamo Di Gesù"	2019	—	—	—	—	—	—	—	—	—	—		Non-album singles
"—" denotes a title that did not chart, or was not released in that territory.

== Videography ==
=== Official Haiducii Videos ===
- Haiducii – Dragostea din tei (Original version)
- Haiducii – Dragostea din tei (Gabry Ponte Remix)
- Haiducii – I need a boyfriend
- Haiducii – Mne S toboy horosho (Gabry Ponte Remix)
- Haiducii – More 'n' More (I love you)

=== Haiducii Live Videos ===
- Haiducii – Dragostea din tei (CD Live, Italy)
- Haiducii – Dragostea din tei (Competition, France)
- Haiducii – Dragostea din tei (France)
- Haiducii – More 'n' More (I love you) (Italy)
- Haiducii – Dragostea din tei (Italy)
- Haiducii – Maria Maria (Germany)

== See also ==
- List of music released by Romanian artists that has charted in major music markets
