= Fly Project =

Romanian dance group

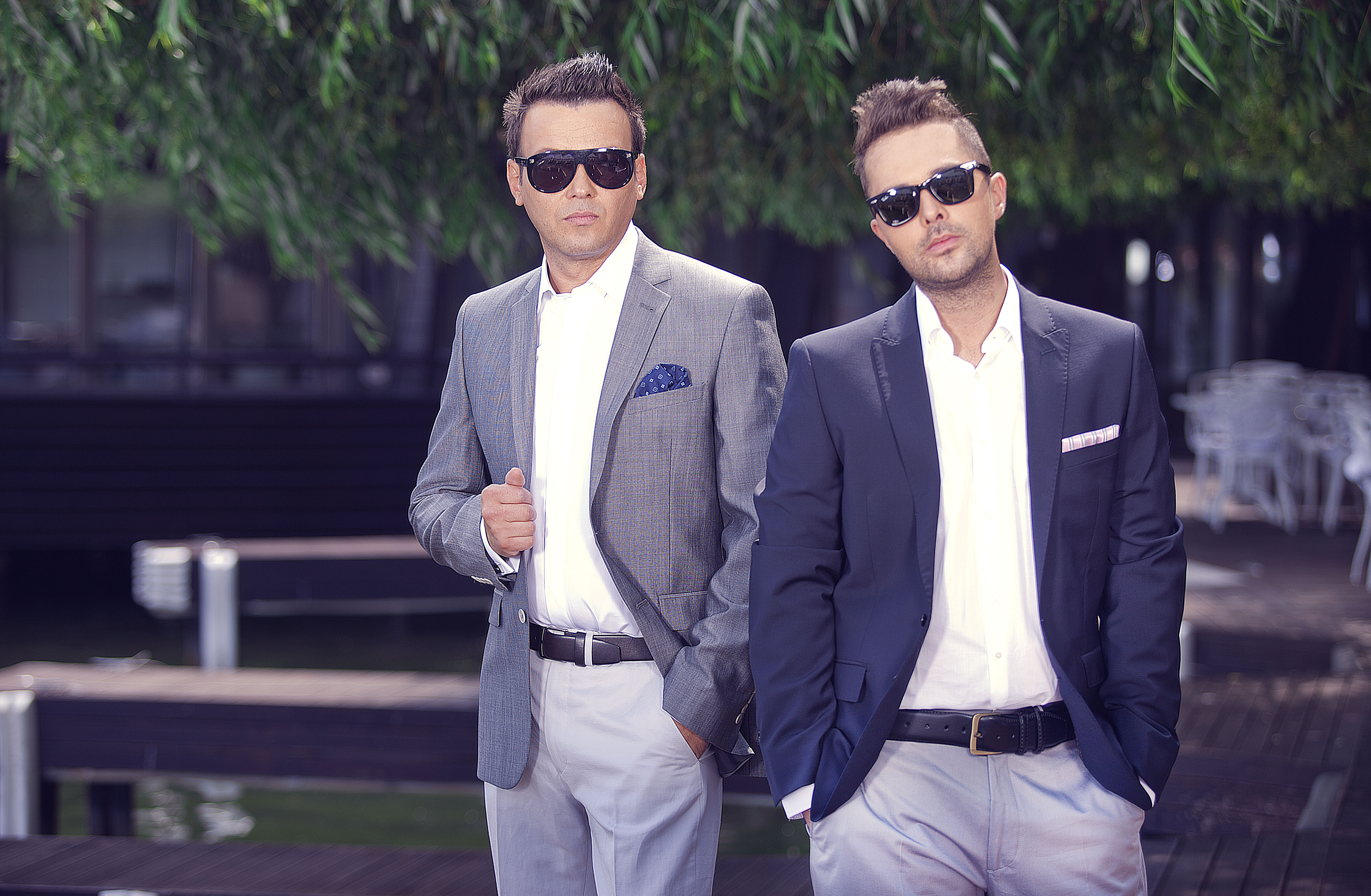
- Fly Project

Background information
- Origin: Bucharest, Romania
- Genres: Dance; Eurodance; house; trance; Latin pop
- Years active: 2005–present
- Label: Roton
- Members: Tudor Ionescu
- Website: http://www.flyproject.ro

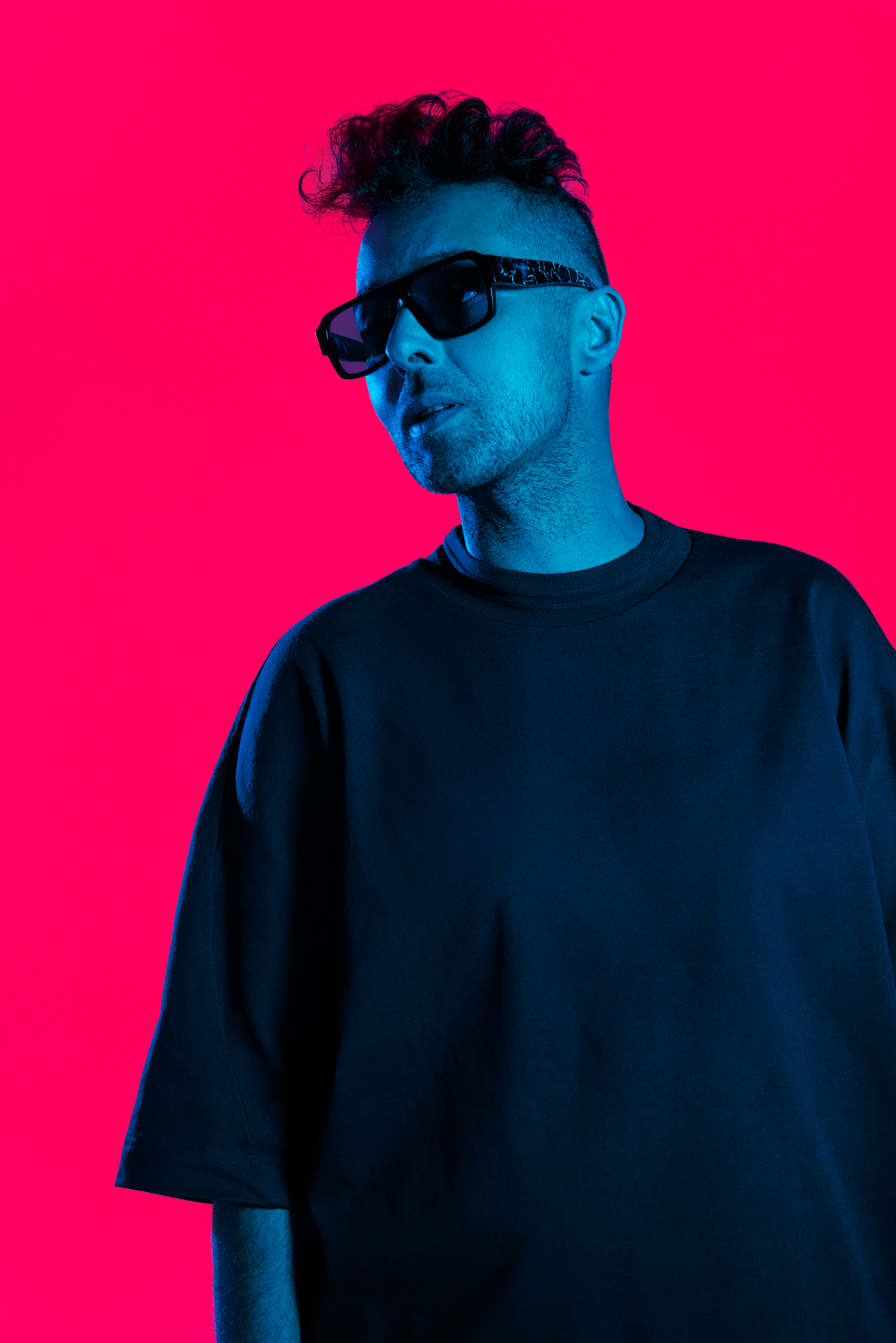
Photo session 2024

Fly Project is a Romanian dance group from Bucharest, Romania, created in 2005 by Tudor Ionescu.

== Career ==
Tudor Ionescu and Dan Deneș release their debut album Fly Project, in 2005. Their first single, "Raisa", was number one in Romania.

In 2007, Fly Project released "K-tinne", another instant success which got them many music awards including the Romanian Top Hits Best Dance and Romanian Top Hits Best Song awards. This was just a prequel to their second album, which registered record sales and broke all booking milestones, managing to secure the most concert bookings in one year.

Following their short musical hits, the band released "Brasil", which similarly topped charts in Romania, Russia, Greece, Spain, Moldova, Turkey, the Netherlands, Serbia and Hungary. Furthermore, the single was nominated for "Best Dance Song" at Romanian Music Awards.

Annually, their next hit singles, "Mandala", "Goodbye", "Musica", "Back In My Life" and "Toca Toca" kept Fly Project as number 1 in the International music charts, from Russia to The Netherlands, India, Greece and Latin America. Fly Project latest single, "Toca Toca" was very popular countries like Italy, Russia, Ukraine, France, Spain, Mexico, Turkey and it continues to be in the music top charts going up even after one year after being released. Fly Project hits again with "Toca Toca" and gets a new Gold Disc for the units they sold in Italy.

In 2014, they won "Best Dance Award", with "Toca Toca", and the "Border Breaker Award", for their international success, at the Romanian Music Awards, marking one of the most important events in the Romanian music industry. Eska Awards is another important event, which takes place in the fall of 2014 in Poland, where Fly Project conquers the audience with its hits. Also, in September 2014, Fly Project took a part in television show Jaka la Melodia, awarded for TV entertainment in Poland. In November 2014, Fly Project has an exceptional show at the Gran Canaria 40 Pop Fashion & Friends, an event of the 40 Principal's radio network in the Canary Islands. With over 40,000 participants, the venue had better stage lighting and monitor system.

In 2015, the group began collaboration with Like a Star. After continuing #MostWanted international tour in June 2015, Fly Project released "So High". In their eleventh anniversary, they released "Next To You". In March 2016, Tudor and Dan released "Tenerife", featuring Romanian artist Misha and DJ Sava. Furthermore, they collaborated for single "Jolie". In the fall of 2016, Fly Project released "Butterfly", featuring Andra and in 2019, they released "Mexico".

As of 2021, Ionescu became the sole member of Fly Project.

== Members ==
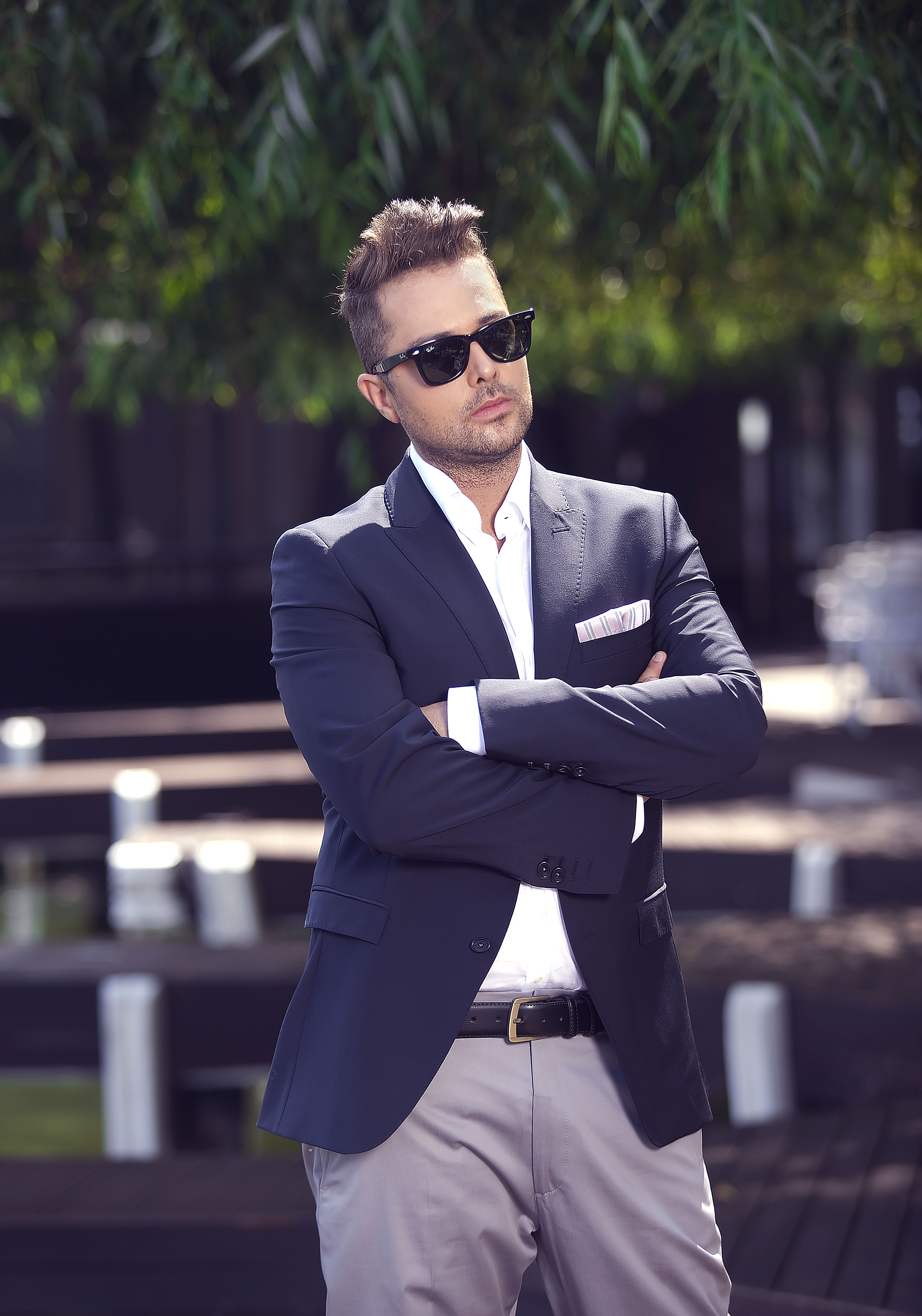
Tudor Ionescu

- Tudor Ionescu (born 3 November 1979, in Brașov)

== Discography ==
=== Albums ===
List of studio albums
Title	Album details
Fly Project	Released: 2005; Label: Roton; Formats: Cassette, CD, digital download
K-Tinne	Released: 3 August 2007; Label: Roton; Formats: CD, digital download

=== Singles ===
==== As lead artist ====
List of singles as lead artist, with selected chart positions and certifications
Title	Year	Peak chart positions							Certifications	Album
Title	Year	ROU	BEL (Wa)	CIS	FRA	ITA	SPA	SWI	Certifications	Album
"Raisa"	2005	1	—	—	51	—	—	—		Fly Project
"Cheyenne"	2006	53	—	—	—	—	—	—		Fly Project
"K-Tinne"	2007	16	—	—	—	—	—	—		K-Tinne
"Tasha"	2007	23	—	—	—	—	—	—		K-Tinne
"Brasil" (featuring Anca Parghel and Tom Boxer)	2008	1	—	3	—	—	—	—		Non-album singles
"Alegria"	2008	—	—	—	—	—	—	—		Non-album singles
"Unisex"	2009	54	—	—	—	—	—	—		Non-album singles
"Mandala"	2010	—	—	8	—	—	—	—		Non-album singles
"Goodbye"	2010	2	—	132	—	—	—	—		Non-album singles
"Musica"	2011	—	—	5	90	6	—	—	FIMI: 2× Platinum	Non-album singles
"Back in My Life"	2012	—	—	5	—	43	—	—		Non-album singles
"Toca-Toca"	2013	—	48	36	10	36	17	75	FIMI: Gold; PROMUSICAE: Platinum	Non-album singles
"Like a Star"	2015	—	—	136	—	—	—	—		Non-album singles
"So High"	2015	—	—	—	—	—	—	—		Non-album singles
"Jolie" (featuring Misha)	2016	—	—	—	—	—	—	—		Non-album singles
"Butterfly" (featuring Andra)	2016	—	—	—	—	—	—	—		Non-album singles
"Dame"	2017	—	—	—	—	—	—	—		Non-album singles
"Get Wet"	2017	—	—	185	—	—	—	—		Non-album singles
"Mexico"	2019	—	—	—	—	—	—	—		Non-album singles
"Millerba"	2021	—	—	—	—	—	—	—		TBA
"En Vogue"	2021	—	—	18	—	—	—	—		TBA
"Bipolar"	2022	—	—	—	—	—	—	—		TBA
“Don Reggaeton”	2023									
Copacabana	2023									
Morenita	2023									
Soarele pe strada mea	2024									
Puerto Rico	2024									
One More Time	2024									
"—" denotes a release that did not chart or was not released in that territory.

==== As featured artist ====
List of singles as featured artist
Title	Year	Peak chart positions	Album
Title	Year	CIS	Album
"Hello" (Mandinga featuring Fly Project)	2014	196	Non-album single
"Fă-mi cu mâna" (Vunk featuring Fly Project)	2015	—	Hituri şi mituri
"Next to You" (Last Night featuring Fly Project)	2016	—	Non-album single
"—" denotes a release that did not chart or was not released in that territory.

==== Other charted songs ====
List of other charted songs
Title	Year	Peak chart positions	Album
Title	Year	ROU	Album
"1001"	2007	82	K-Tinne

== Awards and nominations ==
Fly Project's awards and nominations
Organization	Year	Nominated work	Category	Result (Note: Awards in certain categories do not have prior nominations and only winners are announced by the jury. For simplification and to avoid errors, each award in this list has been presumed to have had a prior nomination.)	Ref.
MTV Romania Music Awards	2006	Fly Project	Best New Artist	Nominated	
MTV Romania Music Awards	2006	"Raisa"	Best Song	Nominated	
Radio România Actualităţi Awards	2006	Fly Project	Best New Artist	Nominated	
Radio România Actualităţi Awards	2006	"Raisa"	Best Pop/Dance Song	Nominated	
Radio România Actualităţi Awards	2008	"K-Tinne"	Best Pop/Dance Song	Nominated	
Radio România Actualităţi Awards	2009	"Brasil"	Best Pop/Dance Song	Won	
Radio România Actualităţi Awards	2017	"Butterfly"	Best Pop/Dance Song	Nominated	
Romanian Music Awards	2008	"Brasil"	Best Dance	Nominated	
Romanian Music Awards	2008	"Brasil"	Best Song	Won	
Romanian Music Awards	2011	Fly Project	Best Group	Nominated	
Romanian Music Awards	2012	"Musica"	Best Dance	Nominated	
Romanian Music Awards	2012	Fly Project	Best Group	Nominated	
Romanian Music Awards	2013	Fly Project	Best Group	Nominated	
Romanian Music Awards	2013	Fly Project	Border Breaker	Won	
Romanian Music Awards	2014	"Toca-toca"	Best Dance	Won	
Romanian Music Awards	2014	Fly Project	Border Breaker	Won	

== See also ==
- List of music released by Romanian artists that has charted in major music markets
