= Toca-Toca =

Single by Fly Project
- Released: 18 September 2013
- Recorded: 2012
- Genre: Latin dance; eurodance; EDM; house
- Length: 2:45
- Label: Roton; Kontor Records; Ego Italy; Wagram
- Songwriters: Tudor Ionescu; Dan Deneș; Tudor Parghel; Tudor Silviu; Adrian Viorel; Filipidescu
- Producer: Fly Project

Fly Project singles chronology
"Musica" (2013)	"Toca-Toca" (2013)	"Hello" (2014)

Music video
- "Toca Toca (official video)" on YouTube; "Toca Toca (lyric video)" on YouTube

"Toca-Toca" is a song performed by Romanian band Fly Project. It was recorded in late 2012, at the Fly Records production studio owned by Tudor Ionescu, Tudor Parghel, Daniel Deneș and Silviu Cristian Tudor. The lead female voice singing the song's chorus is that of Romanian jazz singer, Irina Sârbu. The song was released on 18 September 2013, on Roton Records. It is a bilingual Latin dance song, sung in English and Spanish, and contains some similarities to Eurodance and house music.

The song became popular in early 2014 with Kontor - House of House dance series including it in Volume 19 in February 2014. Following this, "Toca-Toca" became a huge hit in Romania, defending the third position for three non-consecutive weeks. In Spain's PROMUSICAE, the single reached number seventeen. In the French SNEP, the song became a top 10 hit and stayed in the charts for 24 weeks. It also became a top-50 hit in Belgium and a top-80 hit in Switzerland. Although it didn't reach the Italian charts, it was certified gold by the Federation of the Italian Music Industry, denoting downloads exceeding 15,000 units in Italy. "Toca-Toca" was one of the best-selling singles of 2014 in Eastern Europe and reached, as reported by bestmusic.ro, number 56 in the famous chart Shazam World Top 100.

== Music video ==
The official music video was released on 28 October 2013, and was filmed by Romanian director Alex Ceaușu of 'Ador Media' on Rin Grand Hotel's roof in Bucharest, Romania over a period of 24 hours. The video focuses on a couple wearing anthropomorphic "bear" heads who meet and fall in love. When they arrive at a roof party, where Fly Project is singing, the bear-headed couple tries to get the duo on the stage to sing for them. The video exceeds 69 million views on the duo's official YouTube account as of 3 January 2017. In late 2022, a population video were used on the anime version from the Anime Music Video, the video exceeds on 59 million views.

== Track listings ==
- Digital download
1. "Toca-Toca" (Radio Edit) - 2:45
2. "Toca-Toca" (Extended Version) - 4:47
- Italian remix EP
  (Released: February 13, 2014)
1. "Toca-Toca" (Extended Version) - 4:47
2. "Toca-Toca" (Pee4Tee Remix) - 4:18
3. "Toca-Toca" (NRD1 Remix) - 5:27
4. "Toca-Toca" (Gil Sanders Remix) - 4:21
5. "Toca-Toca" (Radio Edit) - 2:45
- The best of Fly Project EP
  (Released: October 09, 2014)
1. "Musica" (Radio Edit) - 3:39
2. "Toca-Toca" (Radio Edit) - 2:45
3. "Back In My Life" (Radio Edit) - 3:16
4. "Musica" (Mollela Remix) - 4:56
5. "Musica" (Pee4Tee Remix) - 5:30
6. "Toca-Toca" (Joe Bertė Remix) - 5:32
7. "Toca-Toca" (Gigi Soriani Remix) - 4:29
8. "Back In My Life" (Felipe C. Remix) - 5:36
9. "Back In My Life" (Alex Noc Remix) - 5:16
10. "Back In My Life" (Daniele P. Remix) - 7:09
- Summer remixes EP
  (Released: July 29, 2014)
1. "Toca-Toca" (Joe Bertė Remix) - 5:32
2. "Toca-Toca" (Gigi Soriani Remix) - 4:29
3. "Toca-Toca" (Daniele Tek Remix) - 6:02
4. "Toca-Toca" (Felipe C. Remix) - 5:50
5. "Toca-Toca" (Mastro J Remix) - 4:38
6. "Toca-Toca" (Venuti & Guat Remix) - 4:44
7. "Toca-Toca" (Joe Bertė Remix Edit) - 3:41

== Charts and certifications ==
=== Weekly charts ===
Chart (2013–2015)	Peak position
Belgium (Ultratop 50 Wallonia)	48
France (SNEP)	10
Italy (FIMI)	36
Poland Airplay (ZPAV)	15
Poland (Polish Airplay TV)	4
Poland (Dance Top 50)	1
Romania (Airplay 100)	3
Russia (NFPP)	36
Spain (Promusicae)	17
Switzerland (Schweizer Hitparade)	75

=== Year-end charts ===
Chart (2014)	Position
France (SNEP)	124
Poland (Dance Top 50)	45
Shazam World Top 100	56

=== Certifications ===
Region	Certification	Certified units/sales
Italy (FIMI)	Platinum	100,000^{‡}
^{‡} Sales+streaming figures based on certification alone.

== See also ==
- List of music released by Romanian artists that has charted in major music markets
