= All My People =

Single by Alexandra Stan vs. Manilla Maniacs

from the album Cliché (Hush Hush)
- Released: 1 May 2013
- Recorded: Maan Studios (Constanța, Romania)
- Genre: Electro dance
- Length: 3:19
- Label: MediaPro
- Songwriters: Marcel Prodan; Andrei Nemirschi
- Producers: Prodan; Nemirschi

Alexandra Stan singles chronology
"Cliché (Hush Hush)" (2012)	"All My People" (2013)	"Baby, It's OK" (2013)

Music video
- "All My People" on YouTube

"All My People" is a song recorded by Romanian recording artist Alexandra Stan for her Japan-only reissue album, Cliché (Hush Hush) (2013). Written and produced by Marcel Prodan and Andrei Nemirschi, the track features vocal collaboration from Prodan's fictional character, Manilla Maniacs. His vocals were particularly praised by music critics as being "low-pitched" and "distorted". Musically, "All My People" is a club-friendly electro dance song and draws influences from Stan's single "Mr. Saxobeat" (2010).

Upon release, the track garnered mostly positive reviews from music critics, who called it "catchy" and found the recording to be unconventional when compared to her previous material. Stan uploaded a music video for the song on YouTube on 3 May 2013—filmed at a heating power plant in Sofia, Bulgaria—the video was directed by Lyusi Ilarionov. Critics pointed out Stan's erotic appearance; the singer is seen lying on a bed sporting lingerie and surrounded by surveillance cameras. Her choreography drew comparisons to work done by American entertainer Michael Jackson, while the singer wore Madonna-esque outfits. "All My People" peaked within the top 60 on music charts in Romania, Italy and Japan.

== Background ==
"All My People"
A 16-second sample of the song, portraying Maniacs' low-pitched and distorted voice in the refrain, which was praised by critics.

The song was written and produced by Marcel Prodan and Andrei Nemirschi, her longtime collaborators, and recorded at their recording studio, Maan Studios, located in Constanța, Romania. Stan made the release of new material public through her Facebook account; she later released an audio version of a new track, "All My People", on SoundCloud. The track portrays a featuring with Prodan's fictional character, Manilla Maniacs, who provides low-pitched and distorted vocals for the refrain. Musically, the single is of the electro dance genre, featuring an alert rhythm and minimal lyrics. Upon the release of the single, Romanian website Urban.ro pointed out the evolution of Stan's artistry, with them confessing that the instrumentation of "All My People" was club-friendly, unlike her 2012 single, "Lemonade", which featured "sweet beats". When interviewed, Stan commented that the song was influenced by her 2010 release, "Mr. Saxobeat".

== Critical reception ==
Kevin Apaza, writing for Direct Lyrics, called the single very "catchy", saying that it was different from the material she had released before; he said that he "just [doesn't] see [the track] as a European monster hit" and confessed that its lyrics and the video concept didn't "make much sense". To close his review, Apaza praised Maniacs's vocal contribution to the song, calling his voice "cool". Frederica de Martino, a writer for the Italian music website Canzoni Web, noted the commercial success of the recording, commenting that "it will be for sure as successful as her previous hits". MTV Romania expected the track to become a "hit".

== Promotion and music video ==
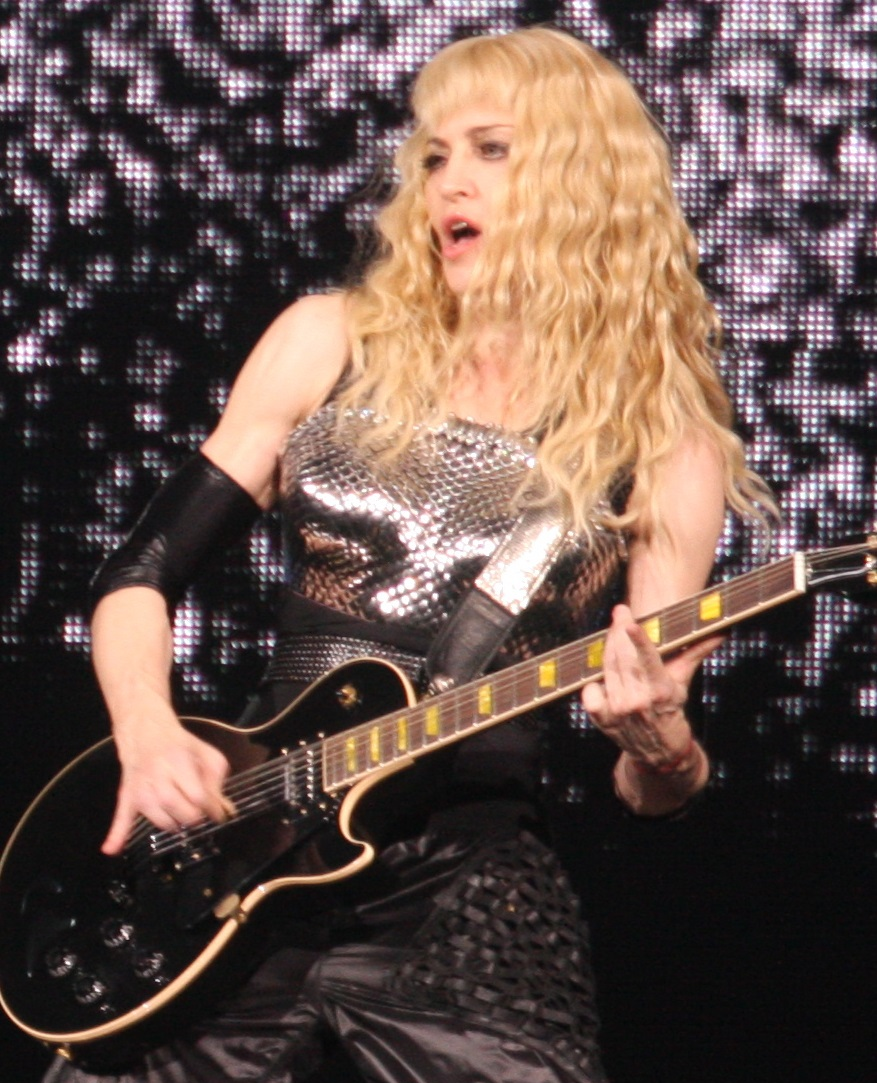
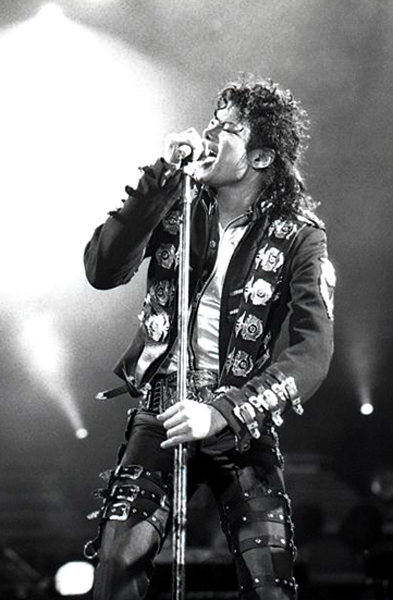
One of the outfits sported by Stan during the video was compared to Madonna (left), while the choreography drew comparations to Michael Jackson's (right) 1980's works.

To promote the song, Stan embarked on a European tour, where she performed in Italy, United Kingdom, Turkey and Russia. Upon its release, Italian radio stations began playing the track on heavy rotation, thus making the song entering the top five of the iTunes Charts there after four days. An official music video for the song was first previewed with a teaser on 2 May 2013, following which it was released onto YouTube on 3 May 2013. Shot in Sofia, Bulgaria, at a heating power plant by Bulgarian director Lyudmil "Lyusi" Ilarionov Borisov, Stan confessed about their collaboration that "[she] knew [him] for a long time and [they] wanted to collaborate already from [her] first music video." Ilarionov revealed that he caught Stan's eye with his work with the Bulgarian singer Andrea. Furthermore, Stan described the filming process as being "difficult", as "the crew didn't speak English or Romanian".

The clip commences with a police car arriving at the heating power plant, followed by Stan lying on a bed surrounded by surveillance cameras, sporting black lingerie. She is then introduced wearing a black hat and white shirt with a tie, while a crowd of male and female dancers perform a synchronized choreography. Following this, Stan makes an appearance wearing a white dress, and a police car is shown arriving. Subsequently, two policemen get out of the car in order to search for Stan. However, they do not find her in the bed and the video ends with Stan leaving the building and the men watching material recorded by the surveillance cameras.

Alexandra Necula, writing for Romanian music website Info Music, said that the clip "exploited the sexuality and sensuality of the artist", with her explaining that Stan's appearance in the video portrayed a woman with pornographic tents. She said that Stan's moves were "lascive", and compared one of her outfits throughout the video to Madonna. Urban.ro compared the choreography of the clip to Michael Jackson's 1980s works. Los 40 Principales cited the video for "All My People" as one of Stan's best clips ever.

== Track listing ==
- Digital download
1. "All My People" - 3:19
- Digital remixes EP
1. "All My People" (Fedo Mora & Oki Doro Remix Edit) - 2:48
2. "All My People" (Fedo Mora & Oki Doro Remix) - 4:50
3. "All My People" (Rudeejay Remix Edit) - 2:55
4. "All My People" (Rudeejay Remix) - 5:24

== Charts ==
Chart (2013–14)	Peak position
Italy (FIMI)	55
Japan (Japan Hot 100) (Billboard)	64
Romania (Airplay 100)	52

== Release history ==
Country	Date	Format	Label
Romania	1 May 2013	Digital single	MediaPro
Italy	3 May 2013	Digital single	Vae Victis
Italy	3 May 2013	Radio airplay	Ego
Italy	12 July 2013	Digital remixes EP	Vae Victis
Spain	2 July 2013	Digital single	Blanco y Negro
Spain	26 November 2013	Digital remixes EP	Blanco y Negro
United States	28 May 2013	Digital single	Ultra

== See also ==
- List of music released by Romanian artists that has charted in major music markets
