= Lollipop (Param Pam Pam) =

Single by Alexandra Stan

from the album Saxobeats
- Released: 2009
- Recorded: Maan Studio (Constanța, Romania)
- Genre: Pop
- Length: 3:55
- Label: Ultra; Prime
- Songwriters: Andrei Nemirschi; Marcel Prodan
- Producer: Marcel Prodan

Alexandra Stan singles chronology
"Lollipop (Param Pam Pam)" (2009)	"Mr. Saxobeat" (2010)

"Lollipop (Param Pam Pam)" is the debut single recorded by Romanian recording artist Alexandra Stan for her debut studio album, Saxobeats (2011). The track was written by Marcel Prodan and Andrei Nemirschi, while production was solely handled by Prodan. It was first released in Romania in 2009. Following the international success of Stan's 2010 single "Mr. Saxobeat", "Lollipop (Param Pam Pam)" was re-distributed in various other countries in 2011. The music video for "Lollipop (Param Pam Pam)" features the singer and other female dancers dancing to the song in front of a purple backdrop; interspersed scenes portray Stan licking a lollipop. She herself described the song as "club-friendly" and as featuring "funny lyrics", while music critics praised it for being a "catchy pop song" and a "club sensation". Sampling elements from American singer Fergie's "Fergalicious" (2006), the single commercially peaked at number 58 on her native Romanian Top 100.

== Background, composition and reception ==
"Lollipop (Param Pam Pam)"
A 20-second sample of the track, which was described as a pop and "club-friendly" song with "funny lyrics".

Before being signed to a record label, Stan participated in various music-related contests, including the Mamaia Music Festival. In 2009, she was discovered by Romanian producers and songwriters Marcel Prodan and Andrei Nemirschi at a karaoke bar. They offered her a record deal with their own label, Maan Records, through which she also released a promotional single called "Show Me The Way". During one of Stan's televised performances on Romanian TV show Acces Direct, she explained that "Lollipop (Param Pam Pam)" was produced "just for fun" after she arrived from a club one night. When interviewed by Urban.ro at her release party of Saxobeats, Stan confessed that she expected positive and negative reception for the song, also saying that it emphasized more her image than her vocal abilities.

The recording makes use of elements from American singer Fergie's 2006 single "Fergalicious" (2006). While Stan said that the track is "club-friendly" and features "funny lyrics", German magazine Klatsch Tratsch named it a "catchy pop song". Celeste Rhoads, writing for AllMusic, praised "Lollipop (Param Pam Pam)" during his review for Saxobeats, calling it a "club sensation" along with 2011 singles "Mr. Saxobeat" and "Get Back (ASAP)". Mike Schiller from PopMatters described the production of the track "generic" and its lyrics "crude", while wishing "that it had been conveniently forgotten about [on the album]".

== Impact and promotion ==
The opening scene of the video sees Stan asking herself which sweets she likes the most, with words such as "candy" appearing on the screen (pictured).

The song reached number 58 on Stan's native Romanian Top 100, receiving airplay on domestic radio stations. It also impacted mainstream radio stations from the United States in early 2010. Meanwhile, the music video for "Lollipop (Param Pam Pam)" garnered 25 million views on YouTube a short time. Following this, various labels from the United Kingdom, Ireland, Canada, Czech Republic, Russia, Italy, France, Israel and the United States asked for license to release the song through their means. In order to promote the single, Stan was invited to perform the recording on various native TV shows, with her as well embarking on a tour in her native Romania. She also provided a live performance of the single during the 2012 Après Ski Hits event in Germany, and sang the song during the concert tours that promoted Saxobeats.

A low-budget accompanying music video for "Lollipop (Param Pam Pam)" was released on 20 December 2009 and was filmed by Andrei Nemirschi in a restaurant. The whole clip portrays Stan and two fellow female dancers performing in front of a purple backdrop. It commences with Stan asking herself which sweets she likes the most, with the words "candy", "chocolate" and "ice cream" appearing on the screen. Following this, the other females are presented wearing white underwear until one of them is shown with a saxophone. Next, Stan is shown blowing a bubble with bubble gum and, after she further dances to the song, the clip ends with the screen displaying the phrase "param pam pam" and finally becoming dark. Scenes interspersed through the main video portrayed Stan seductively licking a lollipop. The clip was not received well by the audience. Spanish-language music station Los 40 Principales named the video for "Lollipop (Param Pam Pam)" as one of Stan's best clips ever.

== Track listing ==
- Digital download
1. Lollipop (Param Pam Pam) [Radio Edit] − 3:55
2. Lollipop (Param Pam Pam) [Club Edit] − 4:12

== Credits and personnel ==
Credits adapted from the liner notes of Saxobeats and The Collection.

Credits

The track samples elements from Fergie's "Fergalicious" (2006).

Personnel

- Maan Studio – recording studio
- Marcel Prodan – songwriter, producer
- Andrei Nemirschi – songwriter, photography, director
- Alexandra Stan – lead vocals

== Charts ==
Chart (2010)	Peak position
Romania (Romanian Top 100)	58

== Release ==
=== Process ===
"Lollipop (Param Pam Pam)" was released as Stan's debut recording in her native Romania in late 2009, charting early in the following year. After the international success of her breakthrough single "Mr. Saxobeat" (2011), it was also issued in various other countries in 2011. In Germany, the single was launched digitally on 9 September 2011 through Prime Music, within the period of the release of its parent record, Saxobeats (2011).

=== History ===
Region	Date	Format	Label
Romania	late 2009	Digital single	—
Canada	31 May 2011	Digital single	Ultra
United States	31 May 2011	Digital single	Ultra
Germany	9 September 2011	Digital single	Prime

== See also ==
- List of media portrayals of bisexuality
