= Get Back (ASAP) =

Single by Alexandra Stan

from the album Saxobeats
- Released: 28 March 2011
- Studio: Maan Studio (Constanța, Romania)
- Genre: Dance
- Length: 3:29 (Radio Edit)
- Label: Play On / Jeff
- Songwriters: Marcel Prodan; Andrei Nemirschi
- Producers: Prodan; Nemirschi

Alexandra Stan singles chronology
"Mr. Saxobeat" (2010)	"Get Back (ASAP)" (2011)	"1.000.000" (2012)

Music video
- Video on YouTube

"Get Back (ASAP)" is a song recorded by Romanian singer Alexandra Stan, released on 28 March 2011 by Play On / Jeff Records as the third single from her debut studio album, Saxobeats (2011). The track was written and produced by Marcel Prodan and Andrei Nemirschi, and was recorded at their Maan Studio in Constanța. Musically, "Get Back (ASAP)" is a dance song with jazz accents, containing a saxophone in its instrumentation. Music critics were positive towards the recording, praising its catchiness, while also comparing it to its predecessor, "Mr. Saxobeat" (2010). "Get Back (ASAP)" also received an award in the Pop/Dance Song of the Year category at the 2012 Radio România Actualități Awards.

Commercially, it was a modest success, reaching the top 20 of the charts in multiple countries. For promotion, an accompanying music video was shot by Iulian Moga in Bucharest, Romania, serving as a continuation for the visual of "Mr. Saxobeat". Uploaded on YouTube on 20 June 2011, it portrays Stan in a saloon bar escaping from two police men that try to arrest her. Another music video was filmed by Ciprian Strugariu for the Maanstudio remix version of the song.

== Composition and reception ==
"Get Back (ASAP)" was recorded at the Maan Studio in Constanța, with writing and production handled by Marcel Prodan and Andrei Nemirschi. It is a 1990s–influenced dance song with jazz accents, also containing a "powerful" saxophone in its instrumentation. Jonathan Mamard of French website Pure Charts and portal Musique Radio noted similarities between the track and its predecessor, "Mr. Saxobeat" (2010). The latter website praised the catchiness of the single, deeming its refrain "more effective" than that of its predecessor, and predicted the track's commercial success. AllMusic's Celeste Rhoads called "Get Back (ASAP)" a "club sensation" along with "Lollipop (Param Pam Pam)" (2009) and "Mr. Saxobeat". The song also received an award in the Pop/Dance Song of the Year category at the 2012 Radio România Actualități Awards.

== Commercial performance ==
The track entered the French Singles Chart at number 42 in April 2011, continuing to ascend until reaching number 19. The song eventually entered the Romanian Top 100 and peaked at number four, her second top five hit after "Mr. Saxobeat", which topped the chart in 2011. "Get Back (ASAP)" also experienced commercial success in other territories, topping the charts in Slovakia and reaching the top ten in Czech Republic, Finland, Hungary and Israel. In the United Kingdom, the single charted on the UK Singles Chart at positions 56.

== Music videos ==
An accompanying music video for "Get Back (ASAP)" was uploaded onto Ultra Music's YouTube channel on 20 June 2011. The clip was shot by Iulian Moga at Castel Film in Bucharest, Romania, in one day. Romanian rapper 1 Q Sapro, Marcel Prodan and Andrei Nemirschi have cameo appearances throughout the video. Stan's label explained that the clip would act as a continuation of "Mr. Saxobeat", "The video continues with the escape of [...] Stan from the police men. To get rid of them, she enters a bar full with rowdy Mexicans that she entices with her music and charm".

The video begins with Stan changing from the police outfit she ended up with in the "Mr. Saxobeat" video into a red dress in a dressing room. Following this, she walks down a staircase into a saloon bar and sings to the bar's crowd. Afterwards, a man makes appearance at the bar and plays cards with Stan in front of all people. Subsequently, the police men who arrested Stan in "Mr. Saxobeat" enter the bar looking for her. They eventually see her and try to arrest her again. However, the man that played cards with the singer defends her, beginning to bar-fight with the police men; they win the fight, with all people lying on the floor. Upon next, the police men are sitting on the bar stool next to the bar man and are presented a tape. Meanwhile, it is shown in a flashback in sepia that, while the men were bar-fighting, Stan was grabbing the money from the cards and ran out of the bar. The video ends with one of the police man punching the bar man. Scenes interspersed throughout the main plot present Stan singing in front of an old-fashioned wall, sporting a white worn blouse and hot pants. An editor from Los 40 Principales cited the video for "Get Back (ASAP)" as one of the singer's best clips ever. Hamard from Pure Charts wrote that the visual would appeal to males and deemed Stan as "sensual".

Another music video for the Maanstudio remix version of the song was shot by Ciprian Strugariu and uploaded onto MediaPro Music's YouTube channel on 9 December 2011. Andra Moga and Violeta Irimia were credited for styling and make-up, respectively. The visual starts with angle shots of the singer lying on sand, followed by her walking on a field wearing a black dress. Subsequently, the singer poses in front of a stonewall and performs to the song sporting a transparent jacket and a black leotard. The last scenes show her on a swing, swimming while a sea storm takes place, and her posing in front of a body of water with a black bodysuit on.

== Track listings ==
- UK digital download
1. "Get Back (ASAP)" [UK Radio Edit] – 2:12
2. "Get Back (ASAP)" [Radio Edit] – 3:29
3. "Get Back (ASAP)" [Extended Version] – 4:26
4. "Get Back (ASAP)" [Rudedog Main Mix] – 6:19
5. "Get Back (ASAP)" [Rudedog Rude Mix] – 6:23
6. "Get Back (ASAP)" [Frisco Remix] – 5:17
7. "Get Back (ASAP)" [Studio Club Radio Edit] – 3:21
8. "Get Back (ASAP)" [Studio Club Mix] – 4:15
- Digital download
1. "Get Back (ASAP)" – 3:29
- Belgian digital download
1. "Get Back (ASAP)" [Radio edit] – 3:30
2. "Get Back (ASAP)" [Extended version] – 4:26
- German/Austrian/Swiss CD single
1. "Get Back (ASAP)" – 3:29
2. "Mr. Saxobeat (Radio Edit)" – 3:17

== Credits and personnel ==
Credits adapted from the liner notes of Saxobeats, Urban.ro and EWow.

- Alexandra Stan – lead vocals
- Andrei Nemirschi – songwriter, producer
- Marcel Prodan – songwriter, producer
- Iulian Moga – director
- Ciprian Strugariu – director (Maanstudio remix version)
- Andra Moga – styling (Maanstudio remix version)
- Violeta Irimia – make-up (Maanstudio remix version)

== Charts ==
=== Weekly charts ===
Chart (2011)	Peak position
Austria (Ö3 Austria Top 40)	27
Belgium (Ultratip Bubbling Under Flanders)	10
Belgium (Ultratop 50 Wallonia)	28
CIS Airplay (TopHit)	123
Czech Republic Airplay (ČNS IFPI)	5
Denmark (Tracklisten)	20
Finland (Suomen virallinen lista)	8
France (SNEP)	19
Germany (Official German Charts) with "Mr. Saxobeat"	73
Global Dance Songs (Billboard)	21
Hungary (Dance Top 40)	20
Hungary (Rádiós Top 40)	8
Israel (Media Forest)	10
Italy (FIMI)	24
Lebanon (OLT20)	18
Netherlands (Dutch Top 40)	18
Poland (Dance Top 50)	14
Poland (Polish Airplay New)	2
Romania (Romanian Top 100)	4
Slovakia Airplay (ČNS IFPI)	1
Spain (Promusicae)	25
Switzerland (Schweizer Hitparade)	23
UK Dance (OCC)	8
UK Singles (OCC)	56

=== Year-end charts ===
Chart (2011)	Position
Hungary (Rádiós Top 40)	77
Poland (Dance Top 50)	41
Romania (Media Forest)	14
Chart (2012)	Position
Hungary (Rádiós Top 40)	98

== Release history ==
Region	Date	Format	Label
France	28 March 2011	Digital download	Play On / Jeff
Spain	17 May 2011	Digital download	Blanco y Negro
Italy	5 July 2011	Digital download	E2 / Vae Victis
Italy	15 July 2011	Radio airplay	Universal
Italy	30 August 2011	CD single	E2 / Ego
United States	10 October 2011	Digital download	Ultra
United Kingdom	18 December 2011	Digital download	3Beat
Germany	2 December 2011	CD single	Columbia

== See also ==
- List of music released by Romanian artists that has charted in major music markets
