= Mr. Saxobeat =

Single by Alexandra Stan

from the album Saxobeats
- Released: 12 September 2010
- Studio: Maan Studios
- Genre: Eurodance; dance-pop; popcorn
- Length: 2:47 (UK version): 3:15 (radio edit); 4:16 (extended mix)
- Label: Ego, Columbia
- Songwriters: Marcel Prodan; Andrei Nemirschi
- Producers: Prodan; Nemirschi

Alexandra Stan singles chronology
"Lollipop (Param Pam Pam)" (2009)	"Mr. Saxobeat" (2010)	"Get Back (ASAP)" (2011)

Music video
- "Mr.Saxobeat" on YouTube

"Mr. Saxobeat" is a song by the Romanian singer Alexandra Stan, released on 12 September 2010 as the second single from her debut album, Saxobeats (2011). The track was written and produced by Marcel Prodan and Andrei Nemirschi, and was recorded at their Maan Studio. Musically, "Mr. Saxobeat" is a Eurodance, dance-pop and popcorn song, with its instrumentation consisting of saxophone and horn as well as synths and techno sounds. The lyrics portray the singer's vision of a perfect man. Reviewers were positive towards the recording, praising its catchiness, the saxophone sequences and Stan's voice.

"Mr. Saxobeat" received nominations at the 2011 Romanian Music Awards and Los Premios 40 Principales 2011, as well as at the 2012 Echo Music Prize. Commercially, it became Stan's breakthrough single, reaching the top ten of the charts in more than 20 countries and being awarded various certifications. As of June 2013, the track sold almost one million units worldwide in less than a year. For promotion, an accompanying music video was shot by Iulian Moga in Buftea, Romania. Uploaded on YouTube on 14 November 2010, it depicts Stan and two friends being arrested, interviewed by the police, put in jail and then escaping from the station. The singer performed the track on multiple occasions, and it was covered by artists such as Selena Gomez & the Scene and Omega. "Mr. Saxobeat" was also featured on some television episodes and on the video games Dance Central 3 and Just Dance 4.

== Background and release ==
In her youth, Alexandra Stan participated in various music-related contests, including the Mamaia Music Festival in 2009. She was discovered by Romanian producers and songwriters Marcel Prodan and Andrei Nemirschi that same year at a karaoke bar in Constanța. They offered her a record deal with their label, Maan Records, and she recorded a promotional single titled "Show Me the Way". The singer rose to fame in Romania with the release of her debut single, "Lollipop (Param Pam Pam)" (2009), which was given radio airplay. It also caught the attention of the management behind the Azerbaijani energy drink Trojka, who approached her with the idea of creating a song to be featured in a commercial for their product. This resulted in "Trojka", a song which would however eventually become the singer's next release, "Mr. Saxobeat". It was recorded at Maan Studios, with the writing and production handled by Prodan and Nemirschi; the mastering was done by Tom Coyne in New York City. In a 2021 interview, Stan stated that she was displeased about not being credited as a composer on the song, claiming that she had been involved in the writing process. A saxophone part was added to "Mr. Saxobeat" since Stan thought it appealed to the Azerbaijani people and culture; she ended up scrapping an older refrain idea in favour of singing the same melody as the saxophone in the chorus. The song was released on 12 September 2010 and was soon after sent to local radio stations.

== Composition ==
"Mr. Saxobeat"
A 23-second sample of "Mr. Saxobeat". Stan's vocal delivery was likened to Barbadian singer Rihanna.

"Mr. Saxobeat" is written in the key of B minor, while its tempo is set at 127 beats per minute. Stan's vocals span from F#_{3} to D_{5}; Maura Johnston from Village Voice compared her delivery to that of Rihanna "in its weary hoarsines". The song is of the Eurodance, dance-pop and popcorn genres. "Mr. Saxobeat" was part of a broader movement in which several Romanian popcorn songs would experience success internationally, promopting the genre to become mainstream. Alongside the "ridiculously catchy" saxophone loop which is played and composed by Cosmin Basasteanu, the track's instrumentation also includes "twinkly" synths, techno beats and horn. The saxophone prominently features a trill, "a very popular effect in sax house records", with it being digitally chopped to bits. Tris McCall from The Star-Ledger wrote, "The link between the saxophone and sexual expression is a long-standing one [...] Breath is tactile and sensuous, and the explosive sound of a sax in full blast carries with it some of the mad rush of desire."

Regarding the saxophone, Stan said when interviewed, "I consider saxophone a very hot and sexy instrument which is also very used in my region." Josh Baines from Vice described the track as a "Balkanized club ballad", further comparing its sound to Yolanda Be Cool and DCUP's "We No Speak Americano" (2010). Billboard called "Mr. Saxobeat" a "one-off mainstream dance single" along with "We No Speak Americano". During the lyrics, Stan sings, "You make me this, bring me up, bring me down, plays it sweet/Make me move like a freak, Mr. Saxobeat", which Baines wrote was Stan's "vision of the perfect man". He also wrote, "The second verse informs us that he's a 'sexy boy' who can set Stan 'free,' but that he's just as 'shy' as he is 'dirty.' Mr. Saxobeat, so it would seem, contains multitudes." Echoing this thought, Stan stated on German television ARD that "Mr. Saxobeat" was only her vision of the perfect man.

== Reception and accolades ==
The song was met with positive reviews from music critics. During a review of Saxobeats, Celeste Rhoads from AllMusic saw "Mr. Saxobeat" as a club sensation along with "Lollipop (Param Pam Pam)" (2009) and "Get Back (ASAP)" (2011). Rodrigo of Yam Magazine wrote, "One day, I heard Mr. Saxobeat by accident and I was instantly hooked. Thanks to its insanely catchy saxophone riffs and Stan's voice, Mr. Saxobeat is a very fun, upbeat song that you can smile and dance to no matter where you are. Plus, the song works like a charm for parties." Both NME's El Hunt and McCall of The Star-Ledger associated the song with the revival of the saxophone in music. The Hollywood Reporter's Shirley Halperin listed the saxophone sequences in "Mr. Saxobeat" in her list of "12 Awesome Sax Solos". Johnston, writing for Village Voice, said "the way they're employed" sounded like Pitbull's "I Know You Want Me (Calle Ocho)" (2009). In his book Stars of 21st Century Dance Pop and EDM: 33 DJs, Producers and Singers ... author James Arena listed it in his "range of sounds that make up the world of the twenty-first century dance music". Fans of the recording include British singer Ellie Goulding, who praised it in a Twitter post in November 2016. At the 2011 Romanian Music Awards, "Mr. Saxobeat" won Best Song and was nominated for Best Dance Song. The track also received a nomination for Best International Song at the Los Premios 40 Principales 2011, and for Hit of the Year at the 2012 Echo Music Prize.

== Commercial performance ==
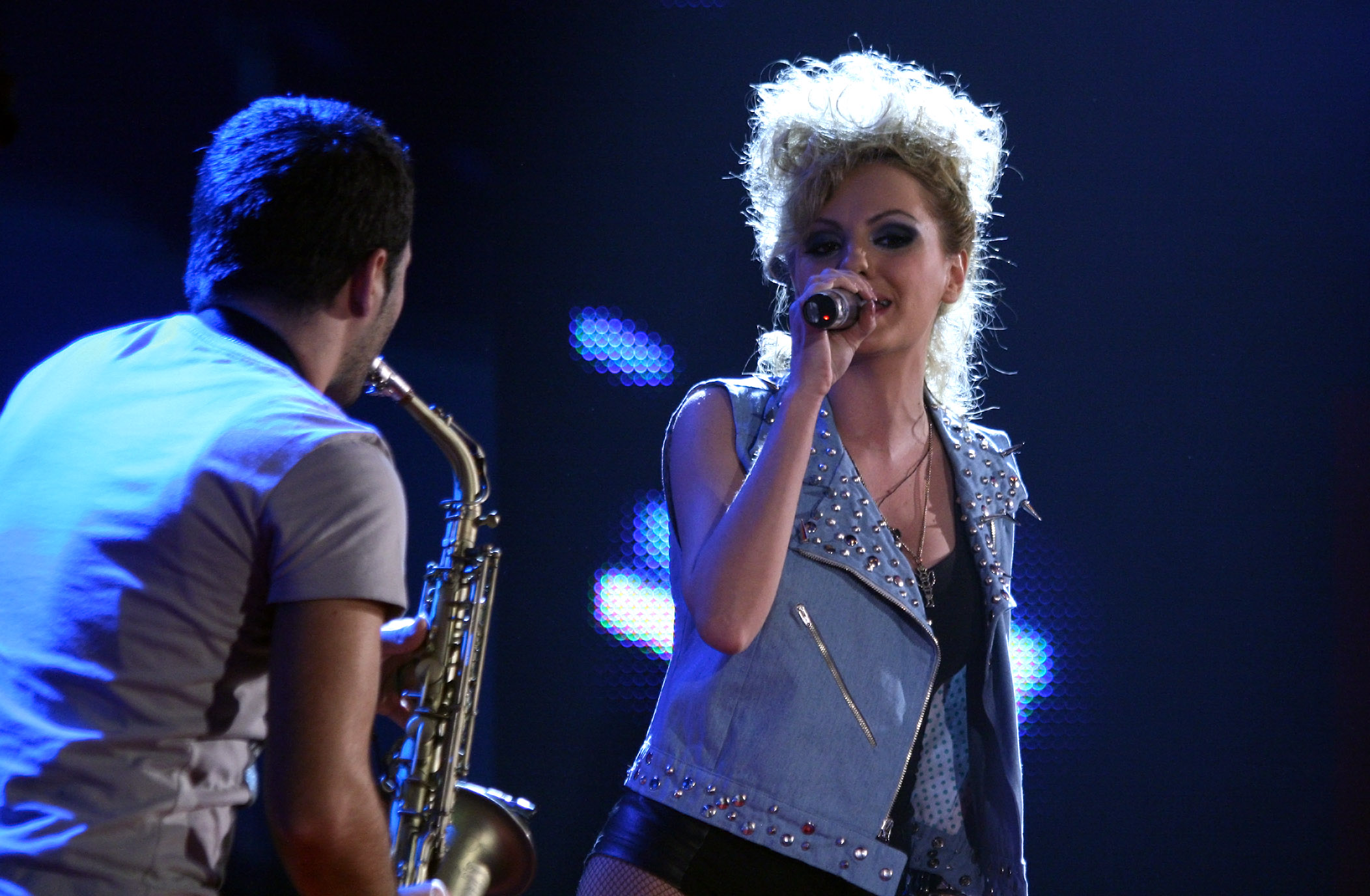
Stan performing "Mr. Saxobeat" on the Austrian Sports Personality of the Year event in 2011 accompanied by saxophonist Cosmin Basasteanu who played the saxophone on the track.

"Mr. Saxobeat" first experienced success in Stan's native country, where it reached number one on the Romanian Top 100 and stayed there for eight consecutive weeks. Subsequently, the single debuted at number 47 on Spain's PROMUSICAE chart, peaking at number three in May 2011 and gaining a Gold certification for exceeding 30,000 units. The single further reached number six in France. In Russia, the single peaked at number one on the country's Tophit chart and was further certified three times Platinum. "Mr. Saxobeat" also notably reached number one in Austria, Denmark, Germany, Hungary, Italy, Slovakia and Switzerland, and was awarded various Gold and Platinum certifications. "Mr. Saxobeat" also reached number three on the UK Singles Chart and number one in Germany. Certified three times Gold, the track was that year's second most successful single in the latter country behind Jennifer Lopez and Pitbull's "On the Floor".

Outside of Europe, "Mr. Saxobeat" debuted on the Canadian Hot 100 at number 72 and peaked at number 25 in that territory. The song spent 20 weeks on the chart and was certified Platinum by Music Canada. In the United States, "Mr. Saxobeats" sold 22,000 units in its first week of availability. On the week ending 30 July 2011, the song debuted on the US Billboard Hot 100 at number 92 and continued rising every week until peaking at number 21. It also managed to reach a number of Billboard's component charts, notably reaching number eight on the US Tropical Airplay chart and number 11 on the Hot Latin Songs chart. "Mr. Saxobeat" became the third Romanian song to top the Dance/Mix Show Airplay chart after Inna's "Hot" (2008) and Edward Maya and Vika Jigulina's "Stereo Love" (2009). By December 2016, the track was certified Platinum by the Recording Industry Association of America (RIAA); it sold one million digital downloads in the United States as of January 2012.

In Australia, Stan's song reached the ARIA chart at position 32, peaking at number 19. "Mr. Saxobeat" was later certified double Platinum by the Australian Recording Industry Association (ARIA). "Mr. Saxobeat" also debuted at number 36 in New Zealand in August 2011 and continued rising upon the charts until reaching number four, similarly earning Stan another Gold certification awarded by the Recording Industry Association of New Zealand (RIANZ). In Asia "Mr. Saxobeat" topped the Israeli Airplay Chart and reached number nine on Lebanon's Lebanese Top 20. In early 2012, the song debuted at the same position on the Japan Hot 100 and was later awarded Platinum by the Recording Industry Association of Japan (RIAJ). As of June 2013, the track sold almost one million copies worldwide in less than a year. Romanian label MediaPro Music further awarded Stan with a Platinum disc for this achievement. In November 2020, "Mr. Saxobeat" reached 200 million streams on Spotify, making it the most streamed song by a Romanian artist on the platform.

== Music video ==
An accompanying music video for "Mr. Saxobeat" was filmed in Buftea, Romania by Iulian Moga on 1 November 2010. The clip was uploaded onto YouTube on 14 November 2010. A behind-the-scenes video was previously aired in November 2010 by Romanian television Music Channel. Los 40 Principales cited the video for "Mr. Saxobeat" as one of Stan's best clips ever. The video begins with scenes of police officers bringing a handcuffed Stan into a room of a police station to interrogate her along with two of her female friends. When she and her friends refuse to give the police any information, they lock them in a jail cell. Stan coaxes and successfully seduces the guard, while her friends steal his police equipment before locking him inside the cell and escaping. The group enters a dressing room where they find police outfits and disguise themselves as officers. They locate the chief's office and hold the police chief and other workers at gun point while duct-taping their hands to the chief's desk. Stan and her friends exit the office and walk inconspicuously through the front lobby and out of the building. Cut scenes show Stan dancing in her cell or her with her friends in police uniform.

== Live performances and covers ==
At most of her live performances of the song, the singer was accompanied by saxophonist Basasteanu on stage, which was his idea. Stan performed the song at French event Starfloor 2011, and on German show Ballermann Hits in late 2011; the latter appearance was controversial as the singer accidentally showed parts of her genitalia. She went on to perform "Mr. Saxobeat" at the 2011 Eska Music Awards, German music show The Dome and on German television ARD's Morgenmagazin as an acoustic version. It was also included on the setlist of concert tours promoting her debut studio album Saxobeats. Covers of the track were done by Russian singer Lena Katina in an acoustic approach, American band Selena Gomez & the Scene on their We Own the Night Tour (2011–12) in Latin America, and Dominican recording artist Omega, whose version peaked at number 25 on Billboard's Latin Digital Songs component chart. "Mr. Saxobeat" was also recorded by Alexandra Stan Tribute Band, reaching number three on the Billboard Luxembourg Digital Songs chart. In July 2021, Strange Fruits Music, Steve Void and DMNDS released their version of the song. Kidz Bop covered "Mr. Saxobeat" in 2012 as part of their album Kidz Bop 21.

== Other usage ==
In December 2011, "Mr. Saxobeat" was released on an extended play with Stan's subsequent single "Get Back (ASAP)" in Germany. It was featured on the sixth episode of the first season of American sitcom Suburgatory titled "Charity Case" and in the last episode of the final season of CSI: Miami, named "Habeas Corpse". The track was also added to the playlist of Cardinal Burns, and was used for the sixth episode of the first season of Faking It. "Mr. Saxobeat" can be further found in Xbox 360 games Dance Central 3 and Just Dance 4. "Endless Summer" (2012) by German singer Oceana, which served as the UEFA Euro 2012 theme song, is based on a sample of "Mr. Saxobeat".

== Track listings ==
- Digital download/French CD single
1. "Mr. Saxobeat" (Radio Edit) – 3:15
2. "Mr. Saxobeat" (Extended Mix) – 4:16
- UK Digital EP
1. "Mr. Saxobeat" (UK Radio Edit) – 2:31
2. "Mr. Saxobeat" (Extended Mix) – 4:15
3. "Mr. Saxobeat" (Hi Def Radio Edit) – 3:00
4. "Mr. Saxobeat" (Hi Def Mix) – 6:53
5. "Mr. Saxobeat" (Kenny Hayes Mix) – 5:30
- Italian CD single
1. "Mr. Saxobeat" (Paolo Noise Radio Edit) – 3:33
2. "Mr. Saxobeat" (Paolo Noise Extended) – 6:04
3. "Mr. Saxobeat" (Gabry Ponte Radio Edit) – 3:02
4. "Mr. Saxobeat" (Gabry Ponte Extended) – 6:03
5. "Mr. Saxobeat" (Ali6 Remix) – 3:22
6. "Mr. Saxobeat" (Wender Remix) – 5:55
- German digital download
1. "Mr. Saxobeat" (Radio Edit) – 3:15
2. "Mr. Saxobeat" (Acoustic Version) – 3:01
3. "Mr. Saxobeat" (Extended Version) – 4:16
4. "Mr. Saxobeat" (Bodybangers Remix) – 5:51
5. "Mr. Saxobeat" (Bodybangers Remix Edit) – 3:23
- German CD single
1. "Mr. Saxobeat" (Radio Edit) – 3:17
2. "Mr. Saxobeat" (Acoustic Version) – 3:03

== Credits and personnel ==
Credits adapted from the liner notes of Saxobeats, Urban.ro and HeavyRotation.ro.

- Alexandra Stan – lead vocals
- Andrei Nemirschi – songwriter, producer
- Marcel Prodan – songwriter, producer
- Tom Coyne – mastering
- Maan Studio – recording studio
- Iulian Moga – director

== Charts ==
=== Weekly charts ===
2010–2012 weekly chart performance for "Mr. Saxobeat"
Chart (2010–2012)	Peak position
Australia (ARIA)	19
Austria (Ö3 Austria Top 40)	1
Belgium (Ultratop 50 Wallonia)	2
Belgium (Ultratop 50 Flanders)	5
Canada Hot 100 (Billboard)	25
CIS Airplay (TopHit)	1
Czech Republic Airplay (ČNS IFPI)	2
Denmark (Tracklisten)	1
Euro Digital Songs (Billboard)	5
Finland (Suomen virallinen lista)	2
France (SNEP)	6
Germany (GfK)	1
Germany Airplay (Nielsen)	1
Global Dance Songs (Billboard)	1
Greece Digital Songs (Billboard)	5
Hungary (Dance Top 40)	4
Hungary (Rádiós Top 40)	1
Hungary (Single Top 40)	8
Ireland (IRMA)	6
Israel Airplay (Media Forest)	1
Italy (FIMI)	1
Japan (Japan Hot 100) (Billboard)	9
Lebanon Airplay (Lebanese Top 20)	9
Luxembourg Digital Songs (Billboard)	6
Mexico (Billboard Mexican Airplay)	2
Mexico Anglo (Monitor Latino)	3
Netherlands (Dutch Top 40)	2
Netherlands (Single Top 100)	4
New Zealand (Recorded Music NZ)	4
Norway (VG-lista)	2
Poland Dance (ZPAV)	2
Poland (Polish TV Airplay Chart)	1
Romania (Romanian Top 100)	1
Romania Airplay (Media Forest)	1
Romania TV Airplay (Media Forest)	1
Russia Airplay (TopHit)	1
Scottish Singles Sales (Official Charts)	2
Slovakia Airplay (ČNS IFPI)	1
Spain (Promusicae)	3
Spain Airplay (PROMUSICAE)	3
Sweden (Sverigetopplistan)	3
Switzerland (Schweizer Hitparade)	1
Turkey (Number One Top 20)	5
UK Dance (Official Charts)	1
UK Singles (Official Charts)	3
Ukraine Airplay (TopHit)	10
US Billboard Hot 100	21
US Dance Club Songs (Billboard)	37
US Dance/Mix Show Airplay (Billboard)	1
US Hot Latin Songs (Billboard)	11
US Pop Airplay (Billboard)	18
US Rhythmic Airplay (Billboard)	29
US Tropical Airplay (Billboard)	8

2025 weekly chart performance for "Mr. Saxobeat"
Chart (2025)	Peak position
Moldova Airplay (TopHit)	73
Poland (Polish Airplay Top 100)	58

=== Year-end charts ===
2010 year-end chart performance for "Mr. Saxobeat"
Chart (2010)	Position
Romania (Romanian Top 100)	69

2011 year-end chart performance for "Mr. Saxobeat"
Chart (2011)	Position
Australia (ARIA)	94
Austria (Ö3 Austria Top 40)	2
Belgium (Ultratop Flanders)	49
Belgium (Ultratop Wallonia)	22
Canada (Canadian Hot 100)	85
CIS (TopHit)	2
Denmark (Tracklisten)	20
Germany (Media Control AG)	2
Greece (IFPI)	33
Hungary (Dance Top 40)	2
Hungary (Rádiós Top 40)	5
Italy (FIMI)	2
Mexico (Monitor Latino)	4
Netherlands (Dutch Top 40)	8
Netherlands (Mega Single Top 100)	17
Poland (Dance Top 50)	9
Romania (Romanian Top 100)	46
Russia Airplay (TopHit)	2
Spain (PROMUSICAE)	12
Spain Airplay (PROMUSICAE)	5
Sweden (Sverigetopplistan)	19
Switzerland (Swiss Hitparade)	3
Ukraine Airplay (TopHit)	22
UK Singles (Official Charts Company)	21
US Dance/Mix Show Airplay (Billboard)	4
US Hot Latin Songs (Billboard)	44

2012 year-end chart performance for "Mr. Saxobeat"
Chart (2012)	Position
Italy (FIMI)	78
Japan (Japan Hot 100)	24
Russia Airplay (TopHit)	98
Ukraine Airplay (TopHit)	146

2024 year-end chart performance for "Mr. Saxobeat"
Chart (2024)	Position
Hungary (Rádiós Top 40)	95

== Certifications ==
Certifications and sales for "Mr. Saxobeat"
Region	Certification	Certified units/sales
Australia (ARIA)	2× Platinum	140,000^{‡}
Austria (IFPI Austria)	Platinum	30,000^{*}
Belgium (BRMA)	Gold	15,000^{*}
Canada (Music Canada)	Platinum	80,000^{*}
Denmark (IFPI Danmark)	2× Platinum	180,000^{‡}
Finland (Musiikkituottajat)	Gold	7,175
France	—	94,400
Germany (BVMI)	5× Gold	750,000^{‡}
Italy (FIMI)	4× Platinum	120,000^{*}
Japan (RIAJ)	Platinum	250,000^{*}
New Zealand (RMNZ)	2× Platinum	60,000^{‡}
Russia (NFPF) Ringtone	3× Platinum	600,000^{*}
Spain (Promusicae)	Gold	30,000^{‡}
Sweden (GLF)	4× Platinum	160,000^{‡}
Switzerland (IFPI Switzerland)	2× Platinum	60,000^{^}
United Kingdom (BPI)	2× Platinum	1,200,000^{‡}
United States (RIAA)	Platinum	1,000,000
Streaming
Denmark (IFPI Danmark)	Gold	50,000^{†}
Summaries
Worldwide	—	1,000,000
^{*} Sales figures based on certification alone.^{^} Shipments figures based on certification alone.^{‡} Sales+streaming figures based on certification alone.^{†} Streaming-only figures based on certification alone.

== Release history ==
Release dates for "Mr. Saxobeat"
Region	Date	Format	Label
Romania	12 September 2010	Unknown	
Italy	28 January 2011	Digital download	Ego
Italy	28 January 2011	Radio airplay	Ego
France	14 February 2011	CD single	Play On / Jeff
Denmark	18 February 2011	Digital download	Sony
United States	24 February 2011	Digital download	Ultra
United Kingdom	21 April 2011	Digital download	AATW
Germany	6 May 2011	Digital download	Sony
Germany	6 May 2011	CD single	Sony
Germany	8 July 2011	CD maxi single	Sony
Italy	28 June 2011	CD single	Ego
Australia	1 July 2011	Digital download	Central Station

== See also ==
- List of music released by Romanian artists that has charted in major music markets
- List of number-one dance airplay hits of 2011 (U.S.)
- List of number-one hits (Denmark)
- List of number-one hits of 2011 (Austria)
- List of number-one hits of 2011 (Germany)
- List of number-one hits of 2011 (Italy)
- List of number-one hits of 2011 (Switzerland)
- List of number-one singles of the 2010s (Hungary)
- List of number-one songs of 2011 (Russia)
- List of Romanian Top 100 number ones
- List of top 10 singles in 2011 (France)
- List of UK Dance Singles Chart number ones of 2011
- List of UK top-ten singles in 2011
