= Alexandra Stan discography =

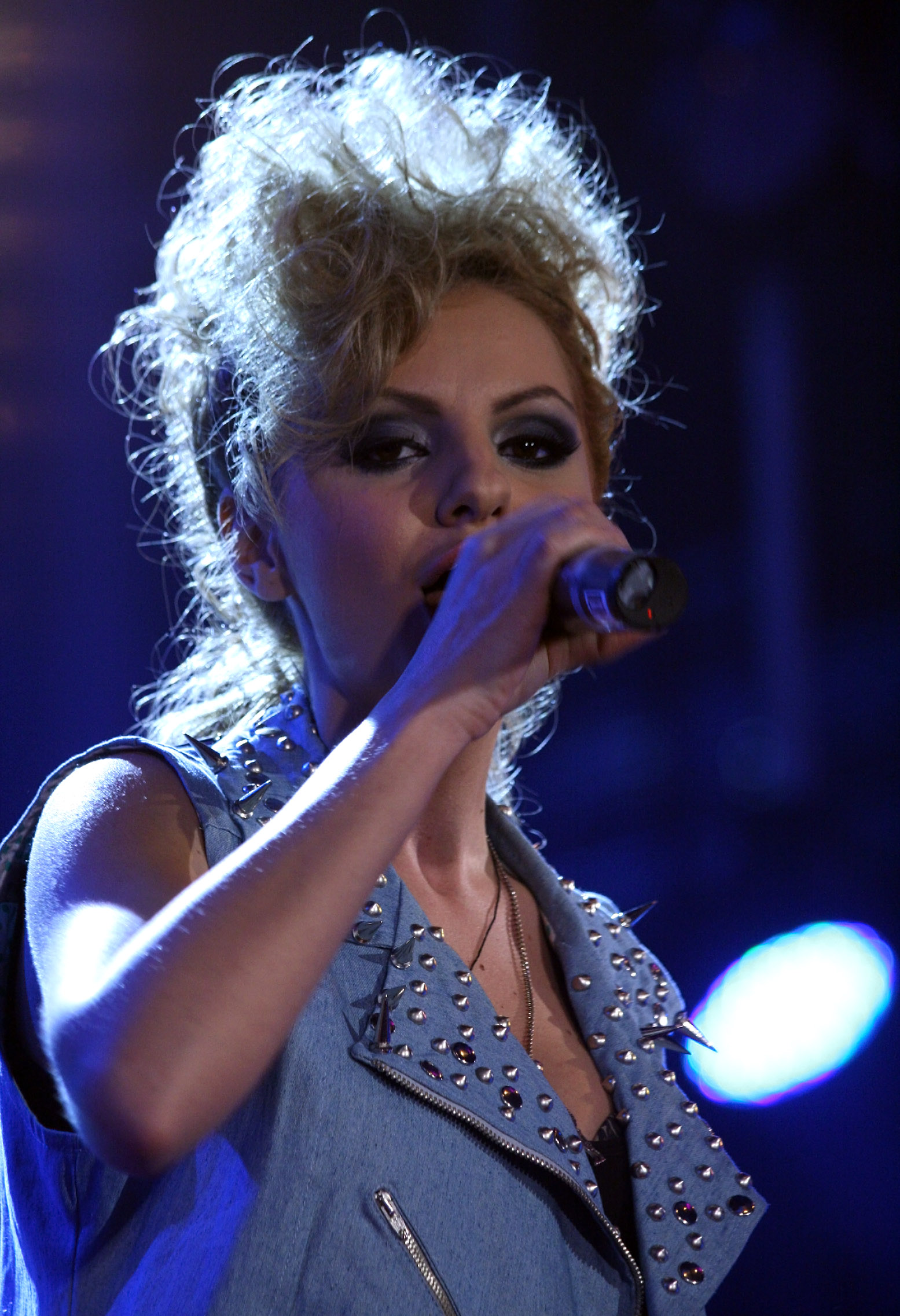
- Stan performing at the Austrian Sports Personality of the Year event in 2011
- Studio albums: 6
- Extended plays: 3
- Compilation albums: 1
- Singles: 32
- Video albums: 1
- Music videos: 43
- Remix albums: 2
- As featured artist: 15
- Promotional singles: 11

Romanian singer Alexandra Stan has released six studio albums, a reissue album, three extended plays, one compilation album, two video albums, two remix albums, 47 singles (including 15 as a featured artist) and 11 promotional singles. Stan's career began in 2009, when music producers Marcel Prodan and Andrei Nemirschi heard her singing at a karaoke bar and signed her to their label, Maan Studio. That same year, she released the promotional song "Show Me the Way". Her debut single, "Lollipop (Param Pam Pam)" (2009), reached number 58 in Romania.

In 2010, the singer released her breakthrough single "Mr. Saxobeat", which was an immediate commercial success, peaking at number one on the Romanian Top 100 for eight consecutive weeks. The single was subsequently released internationally, reaching the top position in several countries across Europe including Germany and Italy. The recording was certified in multiple regions, including Platinum in the United Kingdom and the United States, triple Gold in Germany and Gold in Spain. Stan's follow-up "Get Back (ASAP)" charted in a number of European countries, also peaking at number 56 on the UK Singles Chart. In August 2011, Stan's debut album, Saxobeats, was made available and managed to reach the top 40 in Austria, Finland, Germany, Hungary, Japan and Switzerland.

In 2013, Saxobeats was re-released under the title Cliché (Hush Hush) exclusively in Japan. The reissue spawned three singles: "Lemonade", "Cliché (Hush Hush)" and "All My People". Stan's second studio album, Unlocked, was issued in August 2014 and yielded the singles "Cherry Pop" and "Dance"; both gained popularity in Japan. Unlocked was less commercially successful than Saxobeats, peaking at number 21 on the Japanese Albums Chart. In June 2015, Stan debuted a single with Inna and Daddy Yankee titled "We Wanna" for her third studio album Alesta (2016), reaching modest peaks in several countries. "I Did It, Mama!"—from the same record—peaked at number nine on the local Airplay 100 chart. She was also part of the supergroup G Girls on "Call the Police". Prior to releasing her fourth studio album Mami in April 2018, Stan collaborated with Manuel Riva on "Miami", reaching the top ten in Romania and on the US Dance Club Songs chart. Her 2020 single "Obsesii" reached number 12 on the Airplay 100.

== Albums ==
=== Studio albums ===
List of studio albums, with selected chart positions and sales
| Title | Album details | Peak chart positions | | | | | | | Sales |
| Title | Album details | AUT | FIN | FRA | GER | HUN | JPN | SWI | Sales |
|---|---|---|---|---|---|---|---|---|---|
| Saxobeats | Released: 29 August 2011; Label: MediaPro Music, Play On; Formats: CD, LP, digital download | 25 | 27 | 76 | 29 | 39 | 15 | 24 | JPN: 68,245 (Note: Sales of Saxobeats in Japan as of May 2012) |
| Unlocked | Released: 27 August 2014; Label: Roton, Victor; Formats: CD, digital download | — | — | — | — | — | 21 | — | JPN: 17,045 (Note: Sales of Unlocked in Japan as of January 2015) |
| Alesta | Released: 9 March 2016; Label: Global Records, Roton, Victor; Formats: CD, digital download | — | — | — | — | — | 34 | — | |
| Mami | Released: 25 April 2018; Label: Alexandra Stan, Victor; Formats: CD, digital download | — | — | — | — | — | 119 | — | |
| Rainbows | Released: 29 April 2022; Label: Universal Music Romania; Formats: CD, LP, digital download | — | — | — | — | — | — | — | |
| Energia ta | Released: 11 October 2024; Label: Universal Music Romania; Formats: LP, digital download | — | — | — | — | — | — | — | |
"—" denotes a title that did not chart, or was not released in that territory.

=== Reissued albums ===
List of reissued albums, with selected chart positions and sales
| Title | Album details | Peak chart positions | Sales |
| Title | Album details | JPN | Sales |
|---|---|---|---|
| Cliché (Hush Hush) | Released: 2 October 2013; Label: Maan; Formats: CD, digital download | 53 | JPN: 6,109 (Note: Sales of Cliché (Hush Hush) in Japan as of December 2013) |

=== Remix albums ===
List of remix albums
| Title | Album details |
|---|---|
| Alexandra Stan Mix Exceptional | Released: 12 August 2016; Label: Victor; Format: Digital download |
| Alesta: The Remix + | Released: 23 December 2016; Label: Victor; Format: Digital download |

=== Compilation albums ===
List of compilation albums, with chart positions
| Title | Album details | Peak chart positions |
| Title | Album details | JPN |
|---|---|---|
| The Best | Released: 10 October 2018; Label: Victor; Format: CD | 131 |

== Extended plays ==
List of extended plays
| Title | EP details |
|---|---|
| Get Back (ASAP) // Mr. Saxobeat | Released: 2 December 2011; Label: Columbia; Format: CD, digital download |
| The Best Singles EP | Released: 5 October 2012; Label: E2; Format: Digital download |
| Come Into My World | Released: 6 June 2023; Label: Universal; Format: Streaming |

== Singles ==
=== As lead artist ===
List of singles, with selected chart positions and certifications
| Title | Year | Peak chart positions | | | | | | | | | | Certifications | Album |
| Title | Year | ROM (Note: Airplay 100 replaced the Romanian Top 100 in 2012 after the latter chart ceased its weekly issuing.) | AUT | CZR | FRA | GER | ITA | JPN | SPA | UK | US | Certifications | Album |
|---|---|---|---|---|---|---|---|---|---|---|---|---|---|
| "Lollipop (Param Pam Pam)" | 2009 | 58 | — | — | — | — | — | — | — | — | — | | Saxobeats / Cliché (Hush Hush) |
| "Mr. Saxobeat" | 2010 | 1 | 1 | 2 | 6 | 1 | 1 | 9 | 3 | 3 | 21 | IFPI AUT: Platinum; BPI: 2× Platinum; BVMI: 5× Gold; FIMI: 4× Platinum; RIAJ: Platinum; PROMUSICAE: Gold; RIAA: Platinum | Saxobeats / Cliché (Hush Hush) |
| "Get Back (ASAP)" | 2011 | 4 | 27 | 5 | 19 | 73 (Note: Charted together with "Mr. Saxobeat".) | 24 | — | 25 | 56 | — | | Saxobeats / Cliché (Hush Hush) |
| "1.000.000" (featuring Carlprit) | 2012 | 13 | — | — | — | — | 34 | — | — (Note: "1.000.000" did not chart on the Spanish singles chart, but reached number 21 on the Spanish radio airplay chart.) | — | — | | Saxobeats / Cliché (Hush Hush) |
| "Lemonade" | 2012 | 22 | — | 70 | — | — | 25 | 27 | — | — | — | FIMI: Gold | Cliché (Hush Hush) |
| "Cliché (Hush Hush)" | 2012 | 91 | — | — | — | — | 28 | 11 | — | — | | | Cliché (Hush Hush) |
| "All My People" (vs. Manilla Maniacs) | 2013 | 52 | — | — | — | — | 55 | 50 | — | — | — | | Cliché (Hush Hush) |
| "Thanks for Leaving" | 2014 | 42 | — | — | — | — | 83 | — | — | — | — | | Unlocked |
| "Cherry Pop" | 2014 | 82 | — | — | — | — | — | 64 | — | — | — | | Unlocked |
| "Dance" | 2014 | — | 70 | — | — | — | — | 25 | — | — | — | | Unlocked |
| "Give Me Your Everything" | 2014 | — | — | — | — | — | — | — | — | — | — | | Unlocked |
| "Vanilla Chocolat" (featuring Connect-R) | 2014 | — | — | — | — | — | — | — | — | — | — | | Unlocked |
| "We Wanna" (with Inna featuring Daddy Yankee) | 2015 | 59 | — | 72 | — | — | 60 | 72 | 83 | — | — | FIMI: Gold | Alesta / Inna (Note: "We Wanna" was only present on the Turkish, Polish and Mexican versions of Inna.) / Unlocked (Note: "We Wanna" was only present on the German version of Unlocked.) / Nirvana (Note: "We Wanna" was only present on the Japanese version of Nirvana.) |
| "I Did It, Mama!" | 2015 | 9 | — | — | — | — | — | — | — | — | — | | Alesta |
| "Balans" (featuring Mohombi or the latter and Marc Mysterio) (Note: The version featuring Marc Mysterio was not included on Alesta.) | 2016 | — | — | — | — | — | — | — (Note: "Balans" did not chart on the Billboard Japan Hot 100, but reached number 32 on the Billboard Japan Radio Songs chart.) | — | — | — | IFPI AUT: Gold | Alesta |
| "Écoute" (featuring Havana) | 2016 | 14 | — | — | — | — | — | — | — | — | — | | Alesta |
| "Boom Pow" | 2016 | 67 | — | — | — | — | — | — | — | — | — | | Alesta |
| "9 Lives" (featuring Jahmmi) | 2017 | — | — | — | — | — | — | — | — | — | — | | Alesta |
| "Boy Oh Boy" | 2017 | — | — | — | — | — | — | — | — | — | — | | Mami (Note: "Boy Oh Boy" and "Noi doi" were only present on the Japanese and Italian versions of Mami.) |
| "Noi doi" | 2017 | 80 | — | — | — | — | — | — | — | — | — | | Mami |
| "Mami" | 2018 | — | — | — | — | — | — | — | — | — | — | | Mami |
| "I Think I Love It" | 2019 | 38 | — | — | — | — | — | — | — | — | — | | Rainbows |
| "Obsesii" | 2020 | 12 | — | — | — | — | — | — | — | — | — | | Rainbows |
| "Delfinii" (with Criss Blaziny) | 2020 | — | — | — | — | — | — | — | — | — | — | | Non-album single |
| "Tikari" (featuring LiToo or Mexican Version with W. Corona featuring LiToo) | 2020 | — | — | — | — | — | — | — | — | — | — | | Rainbows |
| "Tembleque" (with Nosfe and Sak Noel featuring Los Tioz) | 2021 | 97 | — | — | — | — | — | — | — | — | — | | Non-album single |
| "Aleasă" | 2021 | 28 | — | — | — | — | — | — | — | — | — | | Rainbows |
| "Come Into My World" (with Nervo) | 2021 | 99 | — | — | — | — | — | — | — | — | — | | Rainbows |
| "Tokyo" | 2021 | — | — | — | — | — | — | — | — | — | — | | Rainbows |
| "Asta-i pentru altcineva" (with Vunk) | 2022 | — | — | — | — | — | — | — | — | — | — | | Non-album single |
| "Bad at Hating You" | 2022 | — | — | — | — | — | — | — | — | — | — | | Rainbows |
| "Heal Your Soul" (with Manuel Riva) | 2022 | — | — | — | — | — | — | — | — | — | — | | Non-album single |
| "Bitch Is Fire" (with Mattn) | 2023 | — | — | — | — | — | — | — | — | — | — | | Non-album single |
| "Bobo" | 2023 | — | — | — | — | — | — | — | — | — | — | | Non-album single |
| "Bine cu puțin rău" | 2023 | — | — | — | — | — | — | — | — | — | — | | Energia ta |
| "Băieții" | 2024 | — | — | — | — | — | — | — | — | — | — | | Energia ta |
| "Dancing in Marabella" (with Sasha Lopez and Manuel Riva) | 2024 | — | — | — | — | — | — | — | — | — | — | | Non-album single |
| "Bambola" (with Toka) | 2024 | — | — | — | — | — | — | — | — | — | — | | Non-album single |
| "Înapoi" | 2024 | — | — | — | — | — | — | — | — | — | — | | Energia ta |
| "Wanna Dance" | 2025 | — | — | — | — | — | — | — | — | — | — | | TBA |
"—" denotes a title that did not chart, or was not released in that territory.

=== As featured artist ===
List of singles, with selected chart positions
| Title | Year | Peak chart positions | | | | | | | Album |
| Title | Year | ROM | AUT | GER | MEX Airplay | SWI | US Dance Club | US Dance/ Elec. | Album |
|---|---|---|---|---|---|---|---|---|---|
| "Mor de dor" (Hi-Q featuring Alexandra Stan) | 2010 | — | — | — | — | — | — | — | Non-album single |
| "Baby, It's OK" (Follow Your Instinct featuring Alexandra Stan) | 2013 | 90 | 31 | 17 | — | 44 | — | — | Animal Kingdom / Alesta |
| "Inimă de gheață" (Trupa Zero featuring Alexandra Stan) | 2014 | 65 | — | — | — | — | — | — | Non-album single |
| "Set Me Free" (DJ Andi featuring Alexandra Stan) | 2014 | — | — | — | — | — | — | — | Unlocked |
| "Motive" (Dorian featuring Alexandra Stan) | 2015 | 62 | — | — | — | — | — | — | Alesta |
| "Au gust zilele" (Criss Blaziny featuring Alexandra Stan) | 2016 | — | — | — | — | — | — | — | Poetul mării |
| "Ciao" (Whitesound featuring Alexandra Stan) | 2016 | — | — | — | — | — | — | — | Non-album singles |
| "Synchronize" (Alex Parker featuring Alexandra Stan) | 2017 | — | — | — | — | — | — | — | Non-album singles |
| "Siempre Tú" (Axel Muñiz featuring Alexandra Stan) | 2017 | — | — | — | 16 | — | — | — | Non-album singles |
| "Save the Night" (Monoir featuring Alexandra Stan) | 2017 | — | — | — | — | — | — | — | Non-album singles |
| "Miami" (Note: After "Miami" has been selected as the anthem for the 2018 Neversea Festival, another version of the song titled "Neversea" with altered lyrics was released along with a music video.) (Manuel Riva featuring Alexandra Stan) | 2018 | 8 | — | — | — | — | 10 | 44 | Non-album singles |
| "Ocean" (8KO featuring Alexandra Stan) | 2018 | — | — | — | — | — | — | — | Non-album singles |
| "Casino Lights" (Tomoro featuring Alexandra Stan) | 2019 | — | — | — | — | — | — | — | Non-album singles |
| "Danger" (RDGLDGRN featuring Nitty Scott and Alexandra Stan) | 2020 | — | — | — | — | — | — | — | Non-album singles |
| "Bandit" (Paul Damixie featuring Alexandra Stan) | 2020 | — | — | — | — | — | — | — | Non-album singles |
| "I Have a Dream (Ecuador)" (MasterM, 24Hours and Alexandra Stan) | 2022 | — | — | — | — | — | — | — | Non-album singles |
| "Mai vară" (Amedeo and Alexandra Stan) | 2022 | — | — | — | — | — | — | — | Non-album singles |
"—" denotes a title that did not chart, or was not released in that territory

=== Promotional singles ===
List of promotional singles
| Title | Year | Album |
|---|---|---|
| "Show Me the Way" | 2009 | Saxobeats |
| "Bitter Sweet" | 2013 | Saxobeats |
| "Crazy" | 2013 | Saxobeats |
| "Ting-Ting" | 2013 | Saxobeats |
| "Like a Virgin" (Note: "Like a Virgin" acts as a cover of Madonna's 1984 song of the same name, and features a new orchestration done by Chris Trace.) | 2017 | Non-album single |
| "Favorite Game" | 2018 | Mami (Note: "Favorite Game" was only present on the Japanese version of Mami.) |
| "Stay" (with Kopo and Drei Ros) | 2018 | Non-album singles |
| "Take Me Home" | 2020 | Rainbows |
| "Future Calling" (with Faustix and Zookeepers) | 2021 | Non-album singles |
| "Home Alone (Macaulay Culkin)" (with Alex Parker) | 2021 | Non-album singles |

=== Other singles ===
List of other singles, with selected chart positions
| Title | Year | Peak chart positions | | Album |
| Title | Year | ROM | POL | Album |
|---|---|---|---|---|
| "Sóc forta" (Note: A charity single for La Marató 2014, "Sóc forta" acts as a Catalan language cover of Cher's "Strong Enough" (1999).) | 2014 | — | — | El Disc de La Marató 2014 |
| "Call the Police" (as part of G Girls) | 2016 | 64 | 6 | Non-album single |
"—" denotes a recording that did not chart or was not released in that territory.

== Videography ==
=== Video albums ===
List of video albums
| Title | Album details | Notes |
|---|---|---|
| The Collection | Released: 19 August 2015; Label: Victor; Formats: DVD | Contains all music videos from "Lollipop (Param Pam Pam)" to "All My People" and from "Thanks for Leaving" to "Vanilla Chocolat" (see music videos). |

=== Music videos ===
List of music videos, with director
| Title | Year | Director |
|---|---|---|
| "Lollipop (Param Pam Pam)" | 2009 | Andrei Nemirschi |
| "Mr. Saxobeat" | 2010 | Iulian Moga |
| "Get Back (ASAP)" | 2011 | Iulian Moga |
| "Get Back (ASAP)" [Maanstudio remix] | 2011 | Ciprian Strugariu |
| "1.000.000" | 2011 | Iulian Moga |
| "Lemonade" | 2012 | Iulian Moga |
| "Cliché (Hush Hush)" | 2012 | Iulian Moga |
| "All My People" | 2013 | Ilarionov Borisov |
| "Baby, It's OK" | 2013 | Oliver Sommer |
| "Inimă de gheață" | 2014 | Khaled Mokhtar |
| "Thanks for Leaving" | 2014 | Khaled Mokhtar |
| "Cherry Pop" | 2014 | Khaled Mokhtar |
| "Dance" | 2014 | Khaled Mokhtar |
| "Give Me Your Everything" | 2014 | Vlad Feneșan |
| "Vanilla Chocolat" | 2014 | Alexandra Stan / The Architect |
| "We Wanna" | 2015 | Khaled Mokhtar / David Gal / Dimitri Caceaune |
| "Motive" | 2015 | Ionut Trandafir |
| "I Did It, Mama!" | 2015 | Bogdan Daragiu |
| "Balans" | 2016 | Anton San |
| "Écoute" | 2016 | Khaled Mokhtar |
| "Call the Police" | 2016 | Roman Burlaca |
| "Au gust zilele" | 2016 | Criss Blaziny |
| "Boom Pow" | 2016 | Ironic Distors |
| "Ciao" | 2016 | Andrei Stan |
| "9 Lives" | 2017 | Criss Blaziny |
| "Synchronize" | 2017 | Criss Blaziny |
| "Siempre Tú" | 2017 | Manuel Escalante |
| "Boy Oh Boy" | 2017 | Bogdan Păun |
| "Noi doi" | 2017 | Bogdan Păun |
| "Save the Night" | 2017 | Unknown |
| "Favorite Game" | 2018 | Gu Suyeon |
| "Mami" | 2018 | Bogdan Păun |
| "Miami" | 2018 | Bogdan Păun |
| "Ocean" | 2018 | Unknown |
| "I Think I Love It" | 2019 | Criss Blaziny |
| "Obsesii" | 2020 | Bogdan Daragiu |
| "Danger" | 2020 | Patrick Lincoln |
| "Take Me Home" | 2020 | Cătălin Dardea |
| "Delfinii" | 2020 | Criss Balziny |
| "Tikari" | 2020 | Loyal Trip Cartel |
| "Bandit" | 2020 | Anton San |
| "Tembleque" | 2021 | Andra Marta / Cristina Poszet |
| "Aleasă" | 2021 | Lofi Blartisio |
| "Come Into My World" | 2021 | Raluca Netca |
| "Tokyo" | 2021 | Raluca Netca |
| "Asta-i pentru altcineva" | 2022 | Anton San |
| "Bad at Hating You" | 2022 | Raluca Netca |
| "Heal Your Soul" | 2022 | Cristina Poszet / Andra Marta / Alexandru Mureșan |
| "Cherry Lips" | 2022 | Claudiu Burcă |
| "Bitch Is Fire" | 2023 | Unknown |
| "Bobo" | 2023 | Bogdan Daragiu |
| "Bine cu Putin Rau" | 2023 | x |

== See also ==
- List of music released by Romanian artists that has charted in major music markets
