= Corazón =

Corazón (Spanish "heart") may refer to:

== Film and TV ==
- Corazón (film), a 1947 Argentine film
- Corazon, an episode from season 6, of Criminal Minds
- Corazon, the alias of a minor character in the manga series One Piece

== Music ==
=== Albums ===
- Corazón (Ednita Nazario album), 1999
- Corazón (Fonseca album), 2005
- Corazón (Santana album), 2014
- Corazones, album by Los Prisioneros, 1990

=== Songs ===
- "Corazón" (Claudia Leitte song), 2015
- "Corazón" (Ricky Martin song), 1997
- "Corazón" (Maluma song), 2017
- "Corazon", a song by Bishop Allen
- "Corazón", a song by Juan Ramón
- "Corazón" (Nelly Furtado and Bomba Estéreo song), 2024
- "Corazón" (Carole King song), on the 1973 album Fantasy
- "Corazón", a song by Hank Crawford, from the 1973 album Wildflower
- "Corazon", a song by Maîtres Gims, 2018
- "Oh My Corazón", a song by Tim Burgess, 2003

== Other uses ==
- Corazón (volcano), a volcano in Ecuador
- Corazon Aquino (1933–2009), president of the Philippines
- Corazon (drag queen), Filipino drag queen
- Corazon Dayro Ong, founder of CDO Foodsphere
