= Boom Pow =

Single by Alexandra Stan

from the album Alesta
- Released: 25 August 2016
- Genre: Europop; dance
- Length: 2:59
- Label: Roton; Global
- Songwriters: David Ciente; Trey Campbell
- Producer: Ciente

Alexandra Stan singles chronology
"Écoute" (2016)	"Boom Pow" (2016)	"9 Lives" (2017)

"Boom Pow" is a song recorded by Romanian recording artist Alexandra Stan for her third studio album, Alesta (2016). It was made available for digital consumption on 25 August 2016 through Roton and Global Records. "Boom Pow" was written by David Ciente and Trey Campbell, while the production process was solely handled by Ciente. A europop and dance recording, Stan confessed that its lyrical content fits with the vibe of Constanța, her home town, where an accompanying music video was also shot in April 2016 by Ironic Distors. While music critics were positive towards the single and its visual, "Boom Pow" commercially peaked at number 67 on Romania's Airplay 100.

== Composition and reception ==
The single was written by David Ciente and Trey Campbell, while production was solely handled by Ciente. Jonathan Currinn, writing for website Celebmix, described "Boom Pow" as a "progressive" song that incorporates both europop and "over-the-top" dance styles in its composition. He further labelled its sound as "mature", and noted the use of "pulsating beats" and "bass-infused synths" in the recording's instrumentation. In an interview, Stan confessed that the track's lyrics "fit perfectly with the vibe of Constanța, which [she] adores. [...] 'Boom Pow' is definitely an invitation to dance and have a good time." While Currinn found the text of "Boom Pow" "catchy" and praised Stan's vocal delivery, Los 40 Principales stated that "no summer is complete without [Stan's] summer bet destined to become a summer song". They also felt that the singer tried new sounds that she hadn't worked with before. Commercially, the single debuted at number 72 on Romania's Airplay 100, and went on to peak at number 67.

== Music video ==
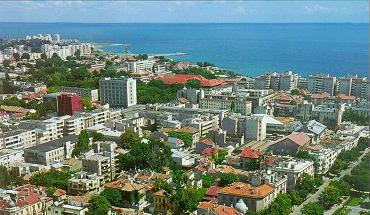
The music video for "Boom Pow" was filmed in various locations of Stan's home town Constanța (pictured), including in front of her residence there.

An accompanying music video for "Boom Pow" was shot in April 2016 but remained unreleased until August 2016, although the singer hinted its premiere through various posts on social media. Together with the track's artwork and a statement for her fans, the visual was finally released on 24 August 2016, after her previous single, Écoute (2016), reached 10 million views on YouTube. It was filmed in various locations in her hometown of Constanța, including in front of her residence, by Ironic Distors, who also served as the director of photography—and features an appearance by her love interest Bogdan Staruiala. Make-up and hair styling were managed by Alex Ifimov and Ema Banita, respectively. About the clip, Stan confessed that she "[loves] the summer and the water, [she is] the child of the sea. [She] wished a 'hometown video' for a long time [...]".

The clip opens with a shot of a sea, and Stan laying on a rock with a pair of white boots designed with her name on them. Subsequently, she is seen dancing in a place sprayed with graffiti and sporting an orange swimsuit paired with a bright blue jacket. Next, while a few males are playing basketball in front of her, she is portrayed watching and interacting with them while wearing a khaki jacket with denim short shorts, a white vest top and white shoes. After the singer and the others further walk through their surrounding and perform to the track, the visual ends with Stan leaning on a wall from the beginning.

Jonathan Currinn, writing for his own music website, described the visual as "relaxed and calm", further stating that the video gives an "insight" of the singer's personality, which can be "constantly seen on her Snapchat stories." He ended his review by concluding that it "may not have a high-end budget, it may not have the best camera work, [...] but it's probably one of most real videos, and I can't help but appreciate the rawness of it."

== Track listing ==
Digital single
No.	Title	Length
1.	"Boom Pow"	2:59

== Charts ==
Chart (2016)	Peak position
Romania (Airplay 100)	67

== Release history ==
Territory	Date	Format(s)	Label
Worldwide	25 August 2016	Digital download	Roton/ Global
