= Balans (song) =

Single by Alexandra Stan featuring Mohombi

from the album Alesta
- Released: 2 March 2016
- Genre: Dance-pop; tropical; Latin
- Length: 3:06
- Label: Global
- Songwriters: Sebastian Barac; Marcel Botezan; Mohombi Nzasi Moupondo; Breyan Isaac
- Producers: Sebastian Barac; Marcel Botezan

Alexandra Stan singles chronology
"I Did It, Mama!" (2016)	"Balans" (2016)	"Écoute" (2016)

Mohombi singles chronology
"Baddest Girl in Town" (2015)	"Balans" (2016)	"Infinity" (2016)

Music video
- "Balans" on YouTube

"Balans" is a song by Romanian recording artist Alexandra Stan for her third studio album, Alesta (2016). Released on 2 March 2016 through Global Records, the track features the vocal collaboration of Swedish-Congolese singer-songwriter Mohombi. "Balans" was produced by Play & Win members Sebastian Barac and Marcel Botezan, while the writing process was handled by the latter two in collaboration with Mohombi and Breyan Isaac.

A dance-pop song incorporating tropical music and Latin music influences into its sound, the recording was compared by critics to the works of fellow Romanian singer Inna. An official music video for "Balans" was shot by Anton San and was uploaded on 9 March 2016 onto YouTube to accompany the single's release. It portrays both Stan and Mohombi being present at a party held in a hall filled halfway by water. Following its release, the song received a mixed review by RnB Junk; they commended the collaboration, but criticized its lack of innovation and formulaic production. Commercially, the song peaked in Japan and Portugal.

== Background and reception ==
"Balans", the third single released from Stan's third record, Alesta (2016), was written by Play & Win members Sebastian Barac and Marcel Botezan, Mohombi and Breyan Isaac, while production was handled by both Barac and Botezan. The artwork used to commercialize the track in Japan was a photograph picked up from the photo shooting for her album, while the international cover sees Stan and Mohombi sporting the outfits from the official music video. The track is an up-tempo dance-pop song, which includes musical elements of tropical music and latin music.

Upon its release, the recording received a mixed review from Italian publication Rnb Junk writer Umberto Olivio, who commended that the song resembles the works of fellow Romanian female singer Inna. He went on into praising Stan's collaboration with Mohombi, but also saying that the "formula" for the recording was "nothing innovative", with him describing the track as "quite obvious". Olivio as well named "the level of palatability" of the tune "a lot weaker than the other songs from Alesta", and denied the possible success of the track in mainstream clubs.

== Promotion and music video ==
Stan (right) and Mohombi (left) flirting during the music video for "Balans".

Stan included "Balans" on the setlist for her Japanese one-week concert tours that promoted the release of her studio album, Alesta, in that territory. Stan performed an acoustic version of the song on Romanian radio station Pro FM. After this, she had also performed a live acoustic version of "Be the One" by English recording artist Dua Lipa.

An accompanying music video for "Balans" was directed by Anton San and released onto Stan's YouTube channel on 2 March 2016; by May 2016, the clip amassed over one million views. The clip was filmed in an abandoned warehouse or a polygon where the inside temperature was of 6 °C. About the video, Stan particularly confessed that "[it] is very dinamic and colored, the way that the life of a pop artist looks like." The clip commences with Stan standing on a pickup, with fellow background dancers being present inside the car. Following their leaving, she looks from above at a partying crowd in a hall, which appears to be halfway filled with water, while sporting pink and red clothing. Subsequently, Stan is displayed dressing a pink fur coat and pants, while walking in the surroundings and finally discovering Mohombi. Following this, he provides his singing part when flirting with Stan, with her dancing around him. Following this, the crowd is once again shown dancing together to the song, and the clip closes with Stan being left alone in the room. Scenes interspersed through the main video show her posing in front of a blue wall or her lying atop the pickup car, with her head being placed on a golden purse. Italian publication RnB Junk writer, Umberto Olivio, criticized the clip for not having a plot and for being "unrealistic".

== Track listing ==
Digital download
No.	Title	Length
1.	"Balans" (featuring Mohombi)	3:06

Remix EP
No.	Title	Length
1.	"Balans [Andros Remix]" (featuring Mohombi)	4:37
2.	"Balans [Deepierro & DJ Rocky Remix]" (featuring Mohombi)	4:23
3.	"Balans [Criminal Sounds Remix]" (featuring Mohombi)	3:21
4.	"Balans [Felipe C. Remix]" (featuring Mohombi)	5:10
5.	"Balans [Sllash Remix]" (featuring Mohombi)	3:41

French version
No.	Title	Length
1.	"Balans" (featuring Mohombi & Marc Mysterio)	3:08

2017 Remix
No.	Title	Length
1.	"Balans 2k18 (French Version) [Deep Matter/Damon Hess English Remix]" (featuring Mohombi & Marc Mysterio)	2:34

== Credits and personnel ==
Credits adapted from the liner notes of Alesta.

Vocal credits

- Alexandra Stan – lead vocals
- Mohombi – featured artist

Technical and songwriting credits

- Sebastian Barac – songwriter, producer
- Marcel Botezan – songwriter, producer
- Mohombi Nzasi Moupondo – songwriter
- Breyan Isaac – songwriter

Visual credits

- Anton San – director, director of photography
- Bogdan Filip – director of photography
- Claudiu Sarghe – hair styling
- Razvan Firea – styling
- Marius Ferascu – styling

== Charts ==
Chart (2016–2018)	Peak position
Japan Radio Songs (Billboard)	32
Portugal (AFP)	21

== Certifications ==
Region	Certification	Certified units/sales
Austria (IFPI Austria)	Gold	15,000^{‡}
^{‡} Sales+streaming figures based on certification alone.

== Release history ==
Country	Date	Format	Label
Japan	2 March 2016	Digital single	Global
Brazil	4 March 2016	Digital single	Global
Greece	4 March 2016	Digital single	Global
Netherlands	4 March 2016	Digital single	Global
Portugal	4 March 2016	Digital single	Global
Romania	4 March 2016	Digital single	Global
Russia	4 March 2016	Digital single	Global
Switzerland	4 March 2016	Digital single	Global
Taiwan	4 March 2016	Digital single	Global
United States	4 March 2016	Digital single	Global
Japan	29 July 2016	Digital remix EP	Global
