= Thanks for Leaving =

Single by Alexandra Stan

from the album Unlocked
- Released: 28 April 2014
- Studio: Perfect Sound, Hollywood, California
- Genre: Electropop
- Length: 3:36
- Label: Fonogram; Roton
- Songwriters: Alexandru Cotoi; Sebastian Jacome; Lee Anna James; Naz Tokio
- Producers: Cotoi; Jacome

Alexandra Stan singles chronology
"Baby, It's OK!" (2013)	"Thanks for Leaving" (2014)	"Cherry Pop" (2014)

"Thanks for Leaving" is a song recorded by Romanian singer Alexandra Stan for her second studio album, Unlocked (2014). It was made available for digital consumption on 28 April 2014 through Fonogram Records and Roton as the record's first single. Written by Alexandru Cotoi, Sebastian Jacome, Lee Anna James and Naz Tokio, the track was solely produced by Cotoi and Jacome. Musically, "Thanks for Leaving" is an electropop ballad whose lyrical themes discuss on new beginnings, choices that can be made in difficult situations to move forward, and discovering the joy of being yourself. Particularly, Stan revealed that the lyrics of the recording were personal to her as referring to her past-manager Marcel Prodan, with whom she had an alleged physical altercation in 2013, which caused her career hiatus that year.

An accompanying music video for the single – directed by Khaled Mokhtar in the United States – was uploaded onto Stan's YouTube channel on 28 April 2014; it was preceded by the release of three short movies. The visual of "Thanks for Leaving" focuses on the singer's relationship with her boyfriend, which ends with him struggling with alcohol issues. Music critics were generally positive towards the recording, praising its lyrical message; one of them found that it could score high at a Eurovision Song Contest. Commercially, the song experienced minor success, reaching number forty-two on the Romanian Airplay 100 and number eighty-three in Italy.

== Background ==
Stan's second studio album, still untitled at that time, was initially intended for a September 2013 release, but following an alleged physical altercation with her former manager Marcel Prodan, the recording was delayed. Stan accused him of physical attack and blackmail. This event led to her appearing injured on Romanian television and taking a career break. Meanwhile, Cliché (Hush Hush), her last record under Prodan's label – Maan Studio – was made available for consumption in Japan. It served as a reissue of Saxobeats (2011) with the addition of three songs ("Lemonade", "Cliché (Hush Hush)" and "All My People"), which were previously released as singles and were intended for her second studio album. After her recovery, the singer was sued by Prodan for using his songs in her live performances without his permission, but won the copyright battle in June 2014. Subsequently, Stan signed a record deal with Fonogram Records and continued working on her album with another team, including new collaborations with record producers and songwriters Alex Cotoi and Erik Lidbom.

== Recordings and composition ==
"When the song was composed, I realized that the people will understand what I have gone through and my wish to fight for a more beautiful life. I wished "Thanks for Leaving" to be the first single after my hiatus, and I am happy that I could express all these sentiments and emotions through the song and its music video."

— Stan on "Thanks for Leaving".

After spending some months in the United States, Stan began working on the track in October 2013 at the two-weeks inaugural international songwriting FonoCamp in 2013, held in Azuga, Romania, where she met various Romanian and international artists. "Thanks for Leaving" was written by Lee Anna James, Naz Tokio, Sebastian Jacome and Alexandru Cotoi, while being solely produced by Jacome and Cotoi. When interviewed by Direct Lyrics, she stated that, "This might sound like a cliché, but I expressed myself best through my work. 'Thanks For Leaving' is a song that I had to do and had to sing, it carries such a strong emotional message for me. It talks about how important it is sometimes to just let go of things and move on. I feel like I've done that. I know others relate to the song's message too, so I do hope it has helped them do the same." The single portrays a "modern" electropop song and a pop ballad, which acts as a departure from her previous dance styles. It also serves as the first ballad released in her career. Lyrically, the recording delves on themes of new beginnings, choices that can be made in difficult situations to move forward, and discovering the joy of being yourself. In interviews, Stan expressed that the content of "Thanks for Leaving" is personal and refers to her recovery following her alleged violent incident previously mentioned with Prodan. Florin Grozea of newspaper Adevărul felt the line "I won't spend another day with you inside my head... How could you be so cruel? Turned me into a liar." was directly addressed to Prodan.

== Reception ==
Upon its release, "Thanks for Leaving" was met with generally positive reviews from music critics. Romanian newspaper Adevărul praised Stan's vocal performance on the song, while also acclaiming its lyrical message. French publication Musique Mag labelled the track "a self-therapy that could climb to the top of the charts this autumn." German music website Hitfire confessed that "Thanks for Leaving" was a "beautiful pop ballad, which also didn't become too dramatic." However, the portal went on into criticizing the singer's accent in her vocals, suggesting that the recording would have sounded better in Romanian language; Hitfire further pointed out that a climax was missing in the track, and denied that "Thanks for Leaving" would become a hit. Commercially, the song experienced minor success. It debuted on the Romanian Airplay 100 at number seventy-one on 11 May 2014, reaching its peak position at number forty-two the next week; it fell to number fifty-one in the week ending 25 May 2014. In Italy, "Thanks for Leaving" opened and peaked on the FIMI chart at position eighty-three, dropping to number ninety-seven the subsequent edition.

== Music video and promotion ==
Shot from the music video, portraying Stan investigating an abandoned vehicle, with her holding a bird on her arm.

The accompanying music video for "Thanks for Leaving" was directed by Khaled Mokhtar, and was previewed by several teasers before being uploaded onto Stan's YouTube channel on 28 April 2014. It was preceded by the release of three short films – "Rebirth of a Passenger", "No Regrets" and "The Right Moment", which featured the singer performing choreography with backup dancers while speaking over a background melody. The visual was filmed in various locations in the United States – including California – in the span of five days; Stan changed eleven outfits throughout the clip.

The visual opens with two men fighting, including one of them being thrown to the floor by the latter. Stan – listening to the action from her house – leaves the place by car, following which she and her boyfriend are presented sitting at opposite ends of a bed. The singer is eventually left by the male alone in the room, with him being shown entering a supermarket while Stan lies on the ground near a piano. Later, he gets back to her house again, but Stan closes the door in his face. Subsequently, she is portrayed traveling with a red car previously shown in the beginning, arriving at an old vehicle and holding a bird on her arm. Over the rest of the music video, the singer is shown meeting her love interest face to face two more times, including a performance of the song to a bar's crowd in which he is featured, sporting a white dress and head accessory. Her suitor ends struggling with alcohol issues. Scenes interspersed through the main video present the singer laying over the abandoned vehicle, and playing the piano in her room.

The song was included on the track list of Stan's Unlocked Tour (2014–15) in Japan. She uploaded a video on her YouTube channel that sees her performing the single while being accompanied by Romanian singer Viky Red on piano. The singer sang the recording live for Romanian radio stations Radio ZU, Pro FM, Radio 21 and Kiss FM. On Radio ZU, Stan further sang a medley of "Mr. Saxobeat" (2011) and "Get Back (ASAP)" (2012).

== Track listing ==
Digital download
No.	Title	Length
1.	"Thanks for Leaving"	3:36

== Credits and personnel ==
Credits adapted from the liner notes of Unlocked and The Collection.

Recording

Recorded at Perfect Sound Studios in Hollywood, California.

Technical and composing credits

- Alexandru Cotoi – composer, producer
- Sebastian Jacome – composer, producer
- Lee Ana James – composer
- John Puzzle – keyboards
- Viky Red – keyboards
- Alexandra Stan – lead vocals
- Naz Tokio – composer

Music video credits

- Mihai Codleanu – Film editing
- Alexandru Dumitru – Foley artist
- Gara Gambucci – styling
- Andra Moga – styling
- Khaled Mokhtar – director, director of photography, script
- Laurent Morel – colorist
- Barna Nemethi – script
- Carmen Rizac – post production coordinator
- Elias Talbot – producer, script

== Charts ==
Chart (2014)	Peak position
Italy (FIMI)	83
Romania (Airplay 100)	42

== Release history ==
Territory	Format	Date	Label(s)
Worldwide	Digital download	28 April 2014	Fonogram; Roton
Italy	Digital download	12 May 2014	Vae Victis; Ego
Italy	Radio airplay	12 May 2014	Ego

== See also ==
- List of music released by Romanian artists that has charted in major music markets
