= Baby, It's OK =

Single by Follow Your Instinct featuring Alexandra Stan

from the album Animal Kingdom and Alesta
- Released: 16 August 2013
- Genre: Dance
- Length: 3:00
- Label: Epic; Sony; Cat
- Songwriters: Harry Wayne Casey; Davon Dixon; Patrick Greska; Addis Mussa; Manuela Necker; Andrei Nemirschi; Marcel Prodan; David Ritter; Marcian Alin Soare; Rainer Wetenkamp
- Producers: Greska; Mussa (co-production); Ritter; Wetenkamp

Follow Your Instinct singles chronology
"My City" (2013)	"Baby, It's OK" (2013)	"Girls" (2013)

Alexandra Stan singles chronology
"All My People" (2013)	"Baby, It's OK" (2013)	"Thanks for Leaving" (2014)

"Baby, It's OK" is a song recorded by German group Follow Your Instinct featuring Romanian recording artist Alexandra Stan for their debut studio album, Animal Kingdom (2016), and the latter's Alesta. It was made available for digital and physical consumption on 16 August 2013 through Epic Records, Sony Music and Cat Music in Germany and Romania. The recording was written by Harry Wayne Casey, Davon Dixon, Patrick Greska, Addis Mussa, Manuela Necker, Andrei Nemirschi, Prodan, David Ritter, Marcian Alin Soare and Rainer Wetenkamp, while production was managed by Greska, Mussa, Ritter and Wetenkamp. Musically, "Baby, It's OK" is a dance song that samples elements of KC and the Sunshine Band's "Give It Up" (1983).

While being generally well received by music critics for being "catchy" and "anthemic", the song experienced moderate success in European territories; it peaked at number seventeen in Germany and within the top fifty in Austria and Switzerland. "Baby, It's OK" was accompanied by the release of a music video shot in Marabella, Spain, which presents the group and Stan performing to the track near a body of water. For further promotion, Follow Your Instinct also made various appearances on media and television.

== Background and composition ==
In an interview, the band confessed that they have worked with Stan for long time, and that their collaboration occurred after a demo version of "Baby, It's OK" was sent to the singer's team, with her eventually accepting the offer. Recording took place before Stan's alleged June 2013 physical altercation with her then-manager, Marcel Prodan.

"Baby, It's OK" was written by Harry Wayne Casey, Davon Dixon, Patrick Greska, Addis Mussa, Manuela Necker, Andrei Nemirschi, Prodan, David Ritter, Marcian Alin Soare and Rainer Wetenkamp, while the production process was handled by Greska, Mussa, Ritter and Wetenkamp. Stan delivers guest vocals for the song, whilst band members Viper and Lionezz have appearances throughout track. A dance recording, "Baby, It's OK" samples elements of "Give It Up" by KC and the Sunshine Band. German magazine Klatsch-Tratsch described the recording to include "anthemic melodies, crisp beats and an extra portion 'eye candy'", while labelling Stan a "pop princess".

== Reception ==
Upon release, the song was generally met with positive reviews from music critics. Romanian publication Libertatea praised the refrain of "Baby, It's OK" for being optimistic, and described its beats as "explosive". Jonathan Currinn, writing in his own website, expected the track to become a hit, although stating that the lyrics "aren't exactly strong and Viper's solo in the song adds nothing. He has a unique voice but it's not something I can see myself listening to, he isn't a great singer, but I can see how his vocals change the track." German portal Mix1 awarded "Baby, It's OK" with seven out of eight stars when reporting about its release.

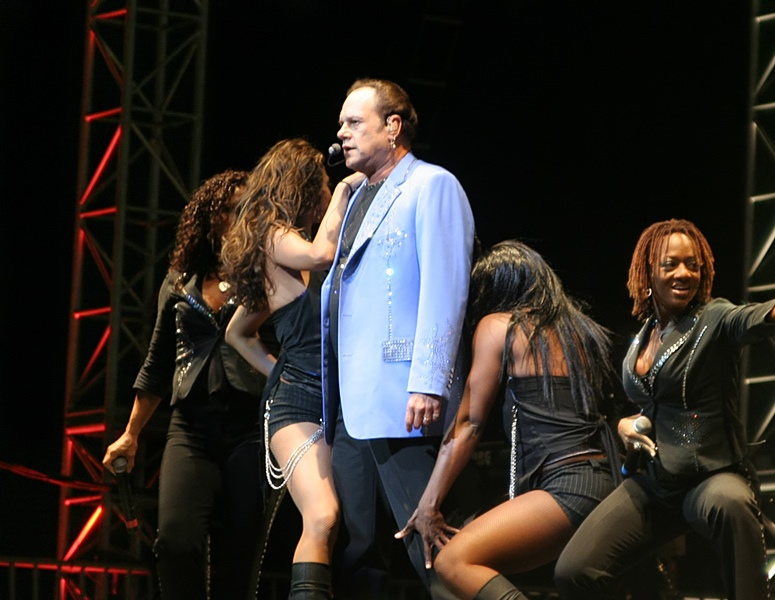
The song samples elements from KC and the Sunshine Band's (pictured) 1983 recording "Give It Up".

Commercially, "Baby, It's OK" was moderately successful in European territories. On the Austrian Singles Chart, the recording debuted at number thirty-one for the week ending 30 August 2013, falling eight positions the next edition. The track spent a total of five weeks on the chart, leaving it in September 2013 at position sixty-four. "Baby, It's OK" reached its highest peak position at number seventeen in Germany, where it remained within the top hundred for six weeks. Additionally, the song opened the Swiss Singles Chart at number forty-four on 1 September 2013, while dropping to position sixty-eight before exiting.

== Promotion ==
An accompanying "summerish" music video for "Baby, It's OK" was filmed in Marabella, Spain and uploaded onto YouTube on 16 August 2013. About the filming, Stan expressed during an interview that "it was very funny [...], the whole team was extremely professional". The visual opens with a woman walking around a pool in early morning, following which the band members and Stan make appearance rapping surrounded by other females in bikinis and lying on a bed outside, respectively. Over the rest of the music video, they further perform to the track near the pool or the sea shore, eventually being present at a night party.

Jonathan Currinn had a mixed review for the visual on his own website, writing, "This music video is a typical video we've seen over and over again, only this has extra scenes you never expect to see in this type of video, so it's not all bad." He went on being positive towards a dance sequence of the clip, calling the dancers "professional", and acclaimed Stan's and Lionezz' appearances. While magazine Klatsch-Tratsch saw the music video as a "catchy beach-clip", French website Pure Charts called it "refreshing and sexy".

The song was solely performed by Follow Your Instinct on German entertainment show ZDF Fernsehgarten on 5 May 2013. The band also appeared on Romanian television shows such as Draga mea prietenă and on the channel Digi24. "Baby, It's OK" was additionally used for Bravo's 2013 compilation "Bravo Black Hits Vol. 29" and Club Sounds's compilation "Club Sounds Vol. 67" released the same year. A version of the recording remixed by German disc jockeys under the pseudonym Bodybangers was included on their debut studio album, Bang the House (2015).

== Track listing ==
Official versions (Note: This acts as a summary of all versions of the single found on its releases.)

1. "Baby, It's OK" (feat. Alexandra Stan) – 3:00
2. "Baby, It's OK" (feat. Alexandra Stan) [Video Edit] – 3:22
3. "Baby, It's OK" (feat. Alexandra Stan) [Radio Edit] – 2:22
4. "Baby, It's OK" (feat. Alexandra Stan) [Acoustic Version] – 3:40
5. "Baby, It's OK" (feat. Alexandra Stan) [Bodybangers Remix] – 5:11
6. "Baby, It's OK" (feat. Alexandra Stan) [Arnold Palmer Remix] – 4:42
7. "Baby, It's OK" (feat. Alexandra Stan) [Bodybangers Remix Edit] – 3:14
8. "Baby, It's OK" (feat. Alexandra Stan) [Dave Ramone Remix Radio Edit] – 3:32

== Credits and personnel ==
Credits adapted from the liner notes of Alesta.

Technical and composing credits

- Harry Wayne Casey – composer
- Davon Dixon – composer
- Patrick Greska – composer, producer
- Addis Mussa – composer, co-producer
- Manuela Necker – composer
- Andrei Nemirschi – composer
- Marcel Prodan – composer
- David Ritter – composer, producer
- Marcian Alin Soare – composer
- Rainer Wetenkamp – composer, producer

Vocal credits

- Follow Your Instinct – lead vocals
- Alexandra Stan – guest vocals

== Charts ==
Chart (2013)	Peak position
Austria (Ö3 Austria Top 40)	31
Germany (GfK)	17
Romania (Airplay 100)	90
Switzerland (Schweizer Hitparade)	44

== Release ==
=== Process ===
"Baby, It's OK" was physically released to the German market on 16 August as a CD single by Epic Records and Sony Music, with it being also made available for consumption in Romania the same day through Cat Music. Additionally, Catchy Tunes Records released a promotional CD in Sweden in 2013, while the single's premiere in Japan occurred in February 2015 through Sony Music. A remixes EP was made available in the United States on 24 September 2013 by Ultra Records.

=== History ===
Country	Date	Format	Label
Germany	16 August 2013	CD single	Epic; Sony
Romania	16 August 2013	Digital download	Cat
Sweden	2013	Promotional CD single	Catchy Tunes
United States	24 September 2013	Digital remixes EP	Ultra
Japan	4 February 2015	Digital download	Sony

== See also ==
- List of music released by Romanian artists that has charted in major music markets
