= Écoute (song) =

Single by Alexandra Stan featuring Havana

from the album Alesta
- Released: 1 July 2016
- Genre: Dance
- Length: 3:16
- Label: Ego
- Songwriters: Nadir Tamuz; Alexandra Ţîrţîrău; Sorin Seniuc; Vanotek
- Producer: Luigi Enciu

Alexandra Stan singles chronology
| "Balans" (2016) | "Écoute" (2016) | "Boom Pow" (2016) |

"Écoute" (French: "Listen") is a song by Romanian recording artist Alexandra Stan for her third studio album, Alesta (2016). Featuring the vocal collaboration of Romanian band Havana, it was sent to Italian radio stations on 1 July 2016 by Ego Music. The lyrics of the recording were written in both English and French by Nadir Tamuz, Alexandra Ţîrţîrău, Sorin Seniuc and Vanotek, with the track being produced by Luigi Enciu. "Ecoute" is a dance song, which incorporates tropical beats and oriental sounds in its instrumentation. According to Stan, the songwriting is based on the theme of limitless and unconditional love.

An accompanying music video for the single was uploaded onto Stan's YouTube channel on 31 May 2016, having surpassed the 10 million views limit the singer set to release a home video for her subsequent single, "Boom Pow" (2016). The visual—portraying Stan performing in front of a snowy landscape—was filmed in March 2016 by Khaled Mokhtar on the top of mountain square Transalpina at −15 °C, near locality Obârșia-Brezoi. Music critics were positive towards the track, comparing Stan's vocals to those of Inna and Fly Project on "Bad Boys" (2015) and "Jolie" (2016), respectively, but also praising it for being bilingual. "Écoute" charted within the top twenty in Romania and Poland's Dance Chart.

== Composition ==
"Écoute"
An 18-second sample of "Écoute", a bilingual dance song which incorporates tropical beats, oriental elements and violins in its instrumentation.

"Écoute" was written by Nadir Tamuz, Alexandra Ţîrţîrău, Sorin Seniuc and Vanotek while being solely produced by Luigi Enciu. Lasting three minutes and sixteen seconds, it is a dance song which musically incorporates tropical beats, oriental elements and violins in its instrumentation. The recording commences with a calm rhythm, and develops in crescendo until the chorus is played. "Écoute" features lyrics written in both English and French, which—according to Stan—delve on "pure love, without barriers, which does not limit you". While Havana provides guest vocals for the track's second verse, Stan's "sexy" vocals in the song were compared by French website Aficia's Valentin Malfroy to those of Romanian singer Inna's on "Bad Boys" (2015) and Romanian band Fly Project's on "Jolie" (2016), with the publication further labeling its lyrics "effective without being complicated". Jonathan Currinn, writing in Outlet Magazine, felt that their vocals "harmonize perfectly giving so much fire that the icy backdrop [from the music video] melts away."

== Reception ==
Upon its release, "Écoute" was acclaimed by music critic Olivio Umberto. Writing for Italian publication RnB Junk, he praised the song for bringing "high-quality dance [music] in European discos", additionally feeling that it was "very desirable for Europe". He concluded, "The English language only serves to capture the listener's attention, since it concerns a very restricted part of the track." Commercially, the recording debuted at number seventy-eight on the Romanian Airplay 100 on 26 June 2016, gradually climbing to number sixteen on 21 August 2016, eventually claiming the place for the next two weeks before reaching its peak position at number fourteen on 11 September 2016. "Écoute" further charted at number eleven on Poland's Dance Chart.

== Promotion ==
Stan performed "Écoute" during various concerts that promoted the release of her album Alesta in Japan and Europe. Accompanied by Havana and a violinist, the singer has also sung the recording in a stripped-down version for Romanian radio stations Kiss FM, Pro FM and Radio 21 on 3 June 7 and 28 June 2016, respectively.

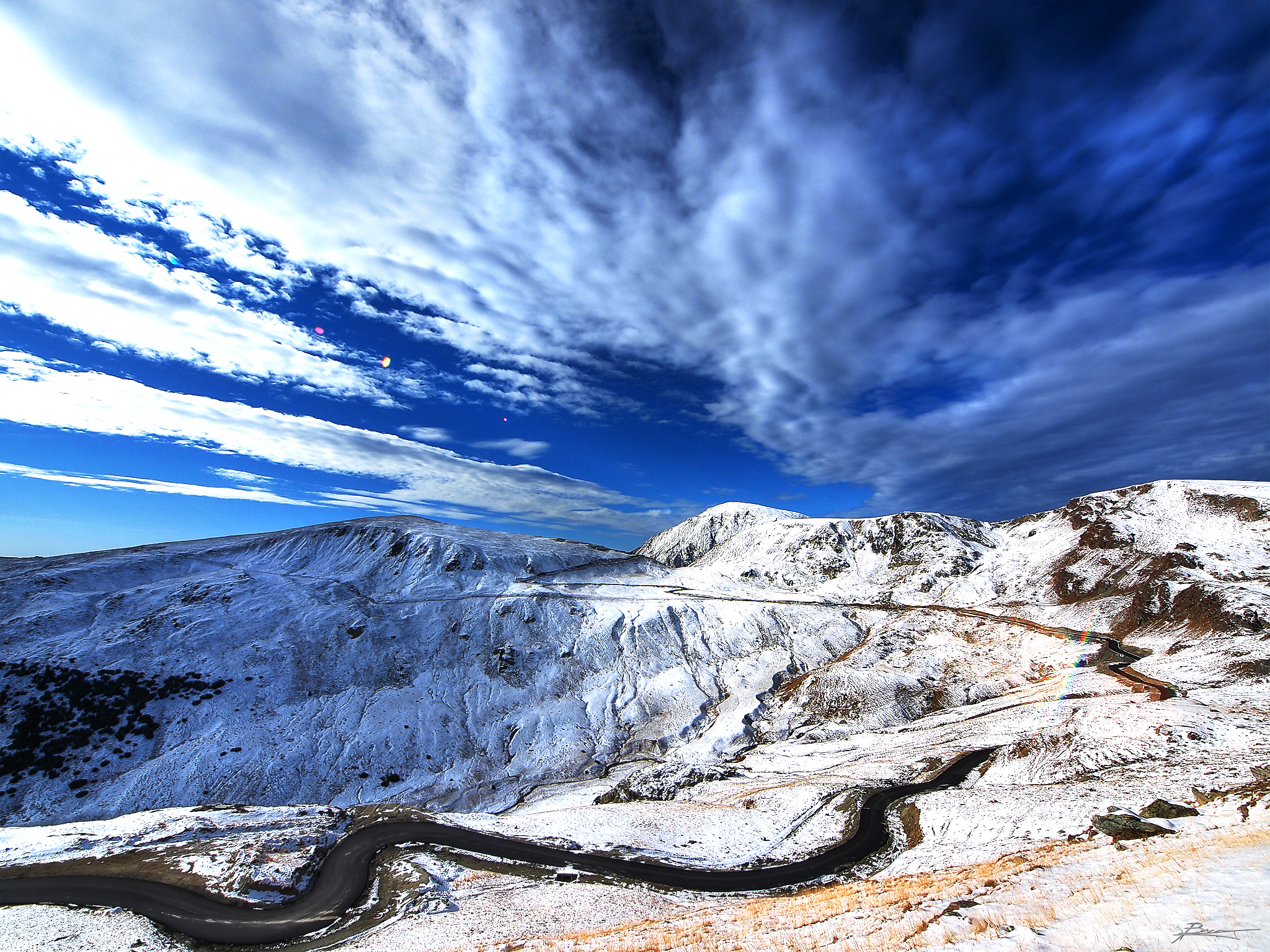
The music video was shot on the Transalpina mountain square (pictured) near Obârșia-Brezoi.

An accompanying music video for the single was uploaded onto Stan's YouTube channel on 31 May 2016; it has surpassed the 10 million views limit the singer set to release a home video for her subsequent single, "Boom Pow" (2016). The visual was filmed in March 2016 by Khaled Mokhtar on the Transalpina mountain square near Romanian locality Obârșia-Brezoi, where Stan used to go with her family in her childhood. The clip was shot at −15˚C on the top of the square, where the entire producing team was brought to with a ratrak. For the shooting, they transformed the refuge of Transalpina Ski Resort's mountain rescuers in a make-up and dressing room.

The visual opens with Stan moving out her jacket, while wearing a blonde wig. Subsequently, a mountain is presented, following which the singer is portrayed with a husky dog in front of a snowy landscape, sporting a white hoodie. Following this, footage with two horses running free is shown, with her tossing her hair in a similar way to the animals' shakes. Over the rest of the music video, Stan further performs to the song, while band Havana make a cameo appearance and are seen in several scenes interspersed through the clip.

Website Aficia confessed that the visual's "snowy landscapes give a winter dimension to the title, in opposition to the heat it could bring." While Info Music claimed that the husky and the white horse used for the music video were metaphors for purity and the singer's personality, respectively, Jonathan Currinn of Outlet Magazine explained that they add "perfect imagery into the clip". Olivio Umberto from RnB Junk was positive towards the visual, with him feeling that "the look, the scenery and clothing present Alexandra in all her beauty and sensuality, but always preserve a class of aura, without ever even getting close to vulgarity."

== Track listing ==
- Russian digital download
1. Écoute (featuring Havana) – 3:16
2. Écoute (featuring Havana) (Extended version) – 4:28

== Credits and personnel ==
Credits adapted from the official music video.

Technical and composing credits

- Luigi Enciu – producer
- Nadir Tamuz – composer
- Alexandra Ţîrţîrău – composer
- Sergiu Musteaţă – mixing, mastering
- Sorin Seniuc – composer
- Vanotek – composer

Vocal credits

- Alexandra Stan – lead vocals
- Havana − featured artist

Visual credits

- Khaled Mokhtar – director

== Charts ==
| Chart (2016) | Peak position |
|---|---|
| Poland Dance (ZPAV) | 11 |
| Romania (Airplay 100) | 14 |
| Turkey (Number One Chart) | 40 |

== Release history ==
| Region | Date | Format | Label |
|---|---|---|---|
| Italy | 1 July 2016 | Radio airplay | Ego |
| Russia | 12 August 2016 | Digital download; streaming | Nikitin |
