= 9 Lives (Alexandra Stan song) =

Single by Alexandra Stan featuring Jahmmi

from the album Alesta
- Released: 13 January 2017
- Genre: Pop; reggae; dancehall; dance
- Length: 3:51
- Label: Roton; Global
- Songwriter(s): Sebastian Arman; Borislav Milanov; Joacim Persson; Jahmmi Youth; Alex Zaidec
- Producer(s): Arman; Persson

Alexandra Stan singles chronology
"Boom Pow" (2016)	"9 Lives" (2017)	"Siempre Tú" (2017)

"9 Lives" is a song recorded by Romanian recording artist Alexandra Stan for her third studio album, Alesta (2016). It was made available for digital download on 13 January 2017 through Roton and Global Records as the record's sixth single, featuring collaborative vocals delivered by Bulgarian reggae performer Jahmmi. "9 Lives" was written by Sebastian Arman, Borislav Milanov, Joacim Persson, Jahmmi Youth and Alex Zaidec, while the production process was handled by Arman and Persson. A pop, reggae, dancehall and dance recording, its optimistic lyrics discuss motivational themes.

An accompanying music video was shot by Criss Blaziny and was released onto the singer's YouTube channel on 12 January 2017. It was filmed in the singer's native Constanța at a seaport and a parkland she used to visit in her youth, and sees her with a black wig walking through her surroundings. Music critics were positive towards the single, acclaiming Jahmmi's contribution and labelling "9 Lives" as catchy and a highlight on Alesta. One reviewer compared the single's title to Stan's 2013 court case and the myth that cats have nine lives.

== Background and composition ==
"9 Lives"
A 22-second sample of "9 Lives", a pop, reggae and dancehall song, which features a motivational message. In the refrain, Stan sings that she has got "attitude and a brand new style".

"9 Lives" features collaborative rap vocals from Bulgarian reggae performer Jahmmi—who received recognition after his appearance on Bulgarian talent show Music Idol—and serves as the sixth single for Stan's third studio album Alesta (2016), which she promoted with a tour throughout Asia in 2016. During an interview, Stan revealed that the recording was initially planned to be released in December 2016, but was finally premiered after "months and months of teasers" in early January 2017 due to "the holidays and everything".

Featuring an extended version, the track was digitally released as a stand-alone single on 13 January 2017 by Roton and Global Records; both versions last three minutes and 51 seconds. A more explicit version of the recording was previously included on Alesta. The song was written by Sebastian Arman, Borislav Milanov, Joacim Persson, Jahmmi Youth and Alex Zaidec, while production was handled by Arman and Persson. It was mixed and mastered by Zino Mikorey. A trenchant pop, reggae, dancehall and dance song, "9 Lives" lyrically delves on the strength to get up and reinvent yourself, with Stan singing that she has got "attitude and a brand new style".

== Critical reception ==
Jonathan Currinn from website Celebmix praised Jahmmi's contribution for "totally taking the spotlight when he needs to", making the recording a highlight on Alesta. Portuguese portal Original Tune labelled Stan as a potential candidate to represent Romania in the Eurovision Song Contest 2017, and Romanian website ZU TV described the sound of "9 Lives" as being catchy and its verses as being optimistic. Gheorghe Chelu of magazine Click! associated its title to both Stan's 2013 court case and the myth that cats have nine lives, naming the singer an optimistic person.

== Promotion ==
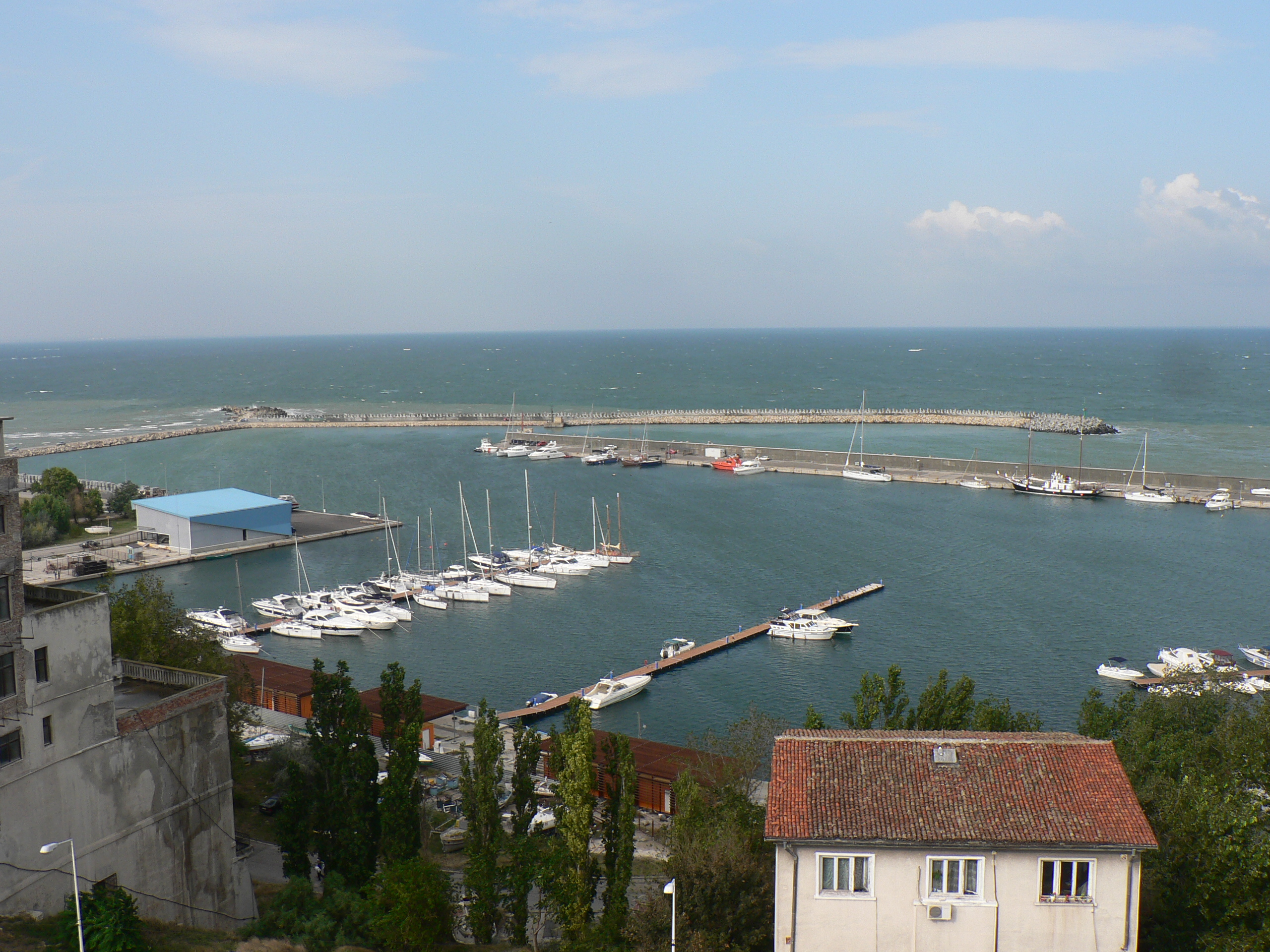
The music video for "9 Lives" was shot at the port of Constanța (pictured) by Criss Blaziny.

Stan performed an acoustic version of "9 Lives" for Romanian radio station Pro FM on 24 January 2017 during their Matinalul ProFM segment. On the same occasion, the singer was challenged to sing with her mouth closed which she eventually accepted, singing her own "Mr. Saxobeat" (2011) alongside Calvin Harris feat. Rihanna's "This Is What You Came For" (2016). She was also invited to sing "9 Lives" on Romanian television show Vorbește Lumea.

An accompanying music video for "9 Lives" was released on 12 January 2017 on Stan's YouTube channel. It was directed by Criss Blaziny in late 2015, with whom the singer had previously collaborated on the 2016 single "Au gust zilele". The clip was filmed in Stan's native Constanța at the port at low temperatures. In the music video, Stan wears a black wig which is made of 100% natural hair.

The visual commences with shots of a black-haired Stan on a swing, with her being subsequently presented at the aforementioned port wearing black clothing along with a grey cap and white shoes. The singer is next shown performing a slutdrop various times and walking through her surroundings. Following this, Stan licks a metal chain and Jahmmi makes appearance in the clip sporting a khaki jacket and black pants. After the latter's rap verse, the singer further dances to the song in the colorful smoke of a firework before the music video ends with her looking in the camera. Jonathan Currinn from music website Celebmix was positive towards "9 Lives", stating about its music video that is a "pure performance piece, with Alexandra Stan bringing some serious performance vibes". He further noticed the singer's appearance in the visual to emphasize the track's message. Russian portal NewsTes noticed the absence of a plot in the recording's music video, naming it a complement to the track.

== Track listing ==
Digital single
No.	Title	Length
1.	"9 Lives (feat. Jahmmi)"	3:51
2.	"9 Lives (feat. Jahmmi) [Extended version]"	3:51

== Release history ==
Territory	Date	Format(s)	Label
Worldwide	13 January 2017	Digital download	Roton/ Global
