= Andas en Mi Cabeza =

2016 single by Chino & Nacho

Single by Chino & Nacho featuring Daddy Yankee
- Released: February 19, 2016
- Length: 4:07
- Label: Machete Music
- Songwriters: Miguel Ignacio Mendoza; Daddy Yankee
- Producer: Jumbo ("El Que Produce Solo")

Chino & Nacho singles chronology
"Se Acabó" (2016)	"Andas en Mi Cabeza" (2016)	"Soy Tu Fan" (2017)

Daddy Yankee singles chronology
"Corazón" (2015)	"Andas en Mi Cabeza" (2016)	"Shaky Shaky" (2016)

Music video
- "Andas en Mi Cabeza" on YouTube

"Andas en Mi Cabeza" is a song by Venezuelan duo Chino & Nacho from their planned fifth studio album, which was never released due to their breakup. It features Puerto Rican singer Daddy Yankee. The track was written by Miguel Ignacio Mendoza and Daddy Yankee, and produced by Jumbo ("El Que Produce Solo"). Machete Music released it as the album's lead single on February 19, 2016. A music video for the song was directed by Nuno Gomes and released on April 19, 2016. It features people proposing to their significant others in various original ways. Chino & Nacho performed the song live as part of numerous televised performances and their Radio Universo Tour.

== Background and composition ==
"Andas En Mi Cabeza" was composed by Miguel Ignacio Mendoza (Nacho) and Daddy Yankee. It was originally written by Mendoza, who sang it together with his colleagues. Daddy Yankee later had the opportunity to listen to the song; he instantly liked it and noted how it was not important if it was one with a romantic background, but a hit in every form. The song was produced by Jumbo (El Que Producer Solo) . It premiered with a live performance by the duo at the Premio Lo Nuestro 2016 on February 18, 2016. The following day it was available for digital download on the iTunes Store. On June 24, 2016, Don Omar announced that he would work on a remix version of "Andas en Mi Cabeza".

"Andas en Mi Cabeza" is a reggaeton and latin pop song. It features romantic lyrics which discuss subjects such as wedding proposals. A writer of El Nacional called it a "love anthem". Writers of Billboard magazine put the song in their list of best songs of the week in March 2016, calling it "catchy".

== Chart performance ==
"Andas en Mi Cabeza" was certified platinum by the Recording Industry Association of America (RIAA) on June 10, 2016 for sales of 60,000 copies in that country. The Productores de Música de España (PROMUSICAE) certified the single platinum for surpassing 8 million streams.

== Music video ==
The music video for the song was directed by Nuno Gomes. It was filmed in various locations across Venezuela, including the Cathedral of Our Lady of Mount Carmel, located in the capital state of Lara, Barquisimeto and Miami. The clip portrays various ways of people asking their lovers to marry them. According to Gomes, the video was "fresh, fun and extrover" with an idea to include various "original, crazy, fun" wedding proposals. On April 8, 2016, the duo released a behind the scenes video of the filming of the video on their official Twitter account. It received its premiere on the program Al Rojo Vivo on the American television network Telemundo on April 19, 2016. The following day it was uploaded on the duo's official Vevo account and other TV platforms in Venezuela.

Following its release on Vevo, the clip for "Andas en Mi Cabeza" broke the record for the most viewed Spanish-language video in a week with 13.6 million views in its first week and 35 million in the first 15 days. By the end of June, the music video for the song was the tenth most-viewed video on YouTube in 2016. A writer of the magazine ¡Hola! opined that the video would "melt the heart" of its female viewers. An El Carabobeño journalist called it a proof of the original ways young people and adults used to propose to their partners. It won in the category for Best Video at the 2016 Heat Latin Music Awards. As of June 2025, the music video has over 1.8 billion views on YouTube and received a nomination for a Lo Nuestro Award for Video of the Year.

== Live performances ==
The first live performance of the song was at the Premio Lo Nuestro 2016 on February 18, 2016. The duo performed the song live as part of the set list during their Radio Universo Tour. Chino & Nacho performed the song live during the 2016 Heat Latin Music Awards on June 16.

== Charts ==
=== Weekly charts ===
Chart (2016)	Peak position
Argentina (Monitor Latino)	11
Argentina Digital Songs (CAPIF)	7
Colombia (Monitor Latino)	1
Ecuador (National-Report)	3
Guatemala (Monitor Latino)	1
Dominican Republic (Monitor Latino)	1
Panama (Monitor Latino)	2
Paraguay (Monitor Latino)	10
Spain (Promusicae)	14
Uruguay (Monitor Latino)	10
US Hot Latin Songs (Billboard)	6
US Latin Airplay (Billboard)	6
US Tropical Airplay (Billboard)	2
Venezuela (Monitor Latino)	1

=== Year-end charts ===
Chart (2016)	Position
Spain (PROMUSICAE)	16
US Hot Latin Songs (Billboard)	17

Chart (2017)	Position
Spain (PROMUSICAE)	55

== Certifications ==
Region	Certification	Certified units/sales
Italy (FIMI)	Gold	25,000^{‡}
Spain (Promusicae)	4× Platinum	160,000^{‡}
United States (RIAA)	15× Platinum (Latin)	900,000^{‡}
^{‡} Sales+streaming figures based on certification alone.

== Accolades ==
Year	Ceremony	Award	Result
2016	Premios Tu Mundo	Party Starter Song	Won
2016	Latin American Music Awards	Favorite Pop/Rock Song	Nominated
2017	Lo Nuestro Awards	Tropical Song of the Year	Nominated
2017	Lo Nuestro Awards	Video of the Year	Nominated
2017	Heat Latin Music Awards	Best Music Video	Pending
