= Siempre Tú =

Single by Axel Muñiz featuring Alexandra Stan
- Released: 21 April 2017
- Studio: Pulse Music Group Studios (Los Angeles, California)
- Genre: Pop; electronic
- Length: 3:37
- Label: Warner Music Mexico
- Songwriter: Axel Muñiz
- Producers: Nico Stadi; Mike Green

Axel Muñiz singles chronology
"Ya No" (2016)	"Siempre Tú" (2017)

Alexandra Stan singles chronology
"9 Lives" (2017)	"Siempre Tú" (2017)	"Boy Oh Boy" (2017)

"Siempre Tú" (English: "Always You") is a song recorded by Mexican singer Axel Muñiz featuring Romanian recording artist Alexandra Stan, released on 21 April 2017 by Warner Music Mexico. It was composed by Muñiz together with its producers Nico Stadi and Mike Green in Los Angeles. "Siempre Tú" has been described as a "contemporary" pop track with electronic influences. It discusses on the theme of love and "how deep it can get with someone, especially when you don't expect it to happen".

The song was met with positive reviews from music critics, who praised its summer vibe and commercial appeal. "Siempre Tú" peaked at number 16 and six on Billboard's Mexico Airplay and Mexico Espanol Airplay charts, respectively. It was promoted by an accompanying music video filmed by Manuel Escalante in Mexico City and Barcelona, presenting Stan and Muñiz virtually walking through the city with virtual reality equipment.

== Background and composition ==
"Siempre Tú" was composed by Muñiz in Los Angeles along with its producers Nico Stadi and Mike Green. It was recorded in the same city at the Pulse Music Group Studios. The idea of the song came to Muñiz after he started to say phrases "like when you think about your girlfriend" accompanied by a piano and an electric guitar. In an interview, the singer stated, "I feel that it is a very Californian song [...] because it is a more proactive and current pop, and the fact that Alexandra Stan recorded a part of the song moved me a lot". On another occasion, he added, "We wanted to do a song with which you can tell a person that you miss her, that you are always thinking about her and longing to be with her. This was the idea of the track". Stan and Muñiz were linked by producer Gabriel Huiban, who previously worked with the latter. "Siempre Tú" was released worldwide on 21 April 2017 through Warner Music Mexico. The accompanying cover artwork shows Muñiz sitting on a chair looking off in the far distance against a backdrop of a street with tall buildings.

Both a Spanish and an English language version of the track were recorded. "Siempre Tú" is a "contemporary" pop track with electronic influences. Its lyrics discuss on the theme of love and "how deep it can get with someone, especially when you don't expect it to happen". Shortly after its release, the song was added to the playlist of Radio Transilvania by the end of April 2017.

== Reception ==
Music critics met the recording with positive reviews. Jonathan Currinn from CelebMix described the song as "full of summer sunshine" and praised Stan and Muñiz's voices for "effortlessly compliment[ing] one another", and the use of the Spanish language. He further wrote that he "can totally see DJs around the world remixing to no end. [He would] love to hear this song in Ibiza as [he] part[ies] the day and the night away". An editor from Antena 1 noted the song's commercial appeal. "Siempre Tú" debuted at number 43 on Billboard's Mexico Espanol Airplay on the week ending 13 May 2017, reaching its peak position at number six on 29 July 2017. On 22 July, the song also peaked on the Mexico Airplay compiled by the same magazine at position 16.

== Music video ==
A lyrics video for the song was uploaded onto Muñiz's YouTube channel on 21 April 2017, showing "some very summery scenes". The release of the official music video followed on 17 May 2017 on the same platform, but was not made available to watch until 26 May 2017. It was directed by Manuel Escalante of Enjambre Producciones in different locations in Mexico City and Barcelona, with production and photography handled by him along with Petter Lettocha and José Casillas. When interviewed, Muñiz explained the concept of the visual, "[...] We were very moved by the idea of having a story of a long-distance virtual and sentimental relationship that is carried out through virtual reality: one in Mexico and the other one in Barcelona. Everything begins [...] when I invariably connect with my partner (Alexandra Stan) through a virtual reality system in which we live a super romance and where we see each other in different locations in Mexico City and Barcelona."

The clip starts with Muñiz texting Stan, with both in different rooms. Following this, the singers put on virtual reality equipment and are seen virtually walking together through the city, sitting on a bench, simulating a kiss, riding bikes and eating at a restaurant. During the last scene of the video, Stan throws Muñiz on the bed before both take off their virtual reality glasses and gloves. The clip received positive response, with Raluca Tanasă from InfoMusic writing that it "showcases the manifestation of love in a virtual way". Currinn of CelebMix stated, "On first watch, the viewers are captured by the beauty of the artists; so much so, that you don’t even realise that they're in different cities during the virtual reality scenes. It's such a sweet and adorable concept, enough to prove that long distance can completely work out between couples if this could actually happen".

== Charts ==
Chart (2017)	Peak position
Mexico Airplay (Billboard)	16

== Release history ==
Territory	Date	Format(s)	Label
Various	21 April 2017	Digital download	Warner
