= Sebastian J. =

Ecuadorian composer, songwriter, and record producer

Sebastian Jacome
- Also known as: Sebastian J.
- Origin: Quito, Ecuador
- Genres: pop, pop rock, dance-pop, electropop, Latin
- Occupation(s): Record producer, Songwriter
- Instrument(s): percussion, synthesizer, keyboards, drums, sampler
- Years active: 2009 – present

Sebastian Jacome, better known as Sebastian J., is a record producer, composer and songwriter who resides in Los Angeles, California. Jacome's production, programming, arranging and remixing credits include artists such as: Alaya, Ozomatli, Huecco, The Cheetah Girls, Jorge Villamizar (Bacilos), Laura Pausini, Christian Chávez, Anahí, Heidi Montag, Paulina Rubio, Justin Bieber, LMFAO, Gloria Trevi, Enrique Iglesias, Demi Lovato and Alexandra Stan.

Jacome was one of the engineers nominated for a Grammy Award in 2008 for the album "Don't Mess with the Dragon" by Ozomatli.
