= Alesta =

- Cover artwork initially used for releases in selected territories; replaced the original standard edition cover for later pressings.

Studio album by Alexandra Stan
- Released: 9 March 2016
- Genre: Dance
- Length: 36:07
- Languages: English; French; Romanian; Spanish
- Labels: Victor; Roton; Global; Warner Bros.; Vae Victis; Ego
- Producers: Sebastian Arman; Sebastian Barac; Marcel Botezan; Ion Chirinciuc; David Ciente; Joacim Persson; Andreas Schuller; Thomas Troelsen

Alexandra Stan chronology
Unlocked (2014)	Alesta (2016)	Mami (2018)

Alternative cover
- Original standard edition cover; replaced by the alternative cover for later pressings except in Japan. The deluxe edition features the same cover, the text being replaced with red.

Singles from Alesta
- 1. "We Wanna" Released: 8 June 2015; 2. "I Did It, Mama!" Released: 27 November 2015; 3. "Balans" Released: 2 March 2016; 4. "Écoute" Released: 9 March 2016 (Note: "Écoute" was not released as a stand-alone single, but was made available for consumption through the premiere of its parent album on 9 March 2016.); 5. "Boom Pow" Released: 25 August 2016; 6. "9 Lives" Released: 13 January 2017

Alesta is the third studio album recorded by Romanian recording artist Alexandra Stan. It was released both digitally and physically on 9 March 2016 through Victor Entertainment as a follow-up to Unlocked (2014). To achieve her desired sound, Stan collaborated with several producers on the record, including Andreas Schuller, Thomas Troelsen, Sebastian Barac and Marcel Botezan. The singer also took part at a music camp organized by Marius Moga, where she further worked on material featured on the album. Musically, Alesta, a dance record, draws influence from ethnic, Eastern and Western European music. Lyrically, Stan confessed during an interview with Cosmopolitan that every recording "[tells] a different story".

Upon its release, Alesta debuted and peaked at number 34 on the Japanese Oricon Albums Chart. Five tracks from the album were released as singles, with "We Wanna"—a collaboration with Inna and Daddy Yankee—reaching the top 60 in several countries. "I Did It, Mama!" was accompanied by a controversial music video, and experienced commercial success in her native country. Fellow singles "Balans", "Écoute" and "9 Lives" portrayed featurings with Swedish-Congolese singer Mohombi, Romanian band Havana and Bulgarian reggae performer Jahmmi, respectively. To promote Alesta, Stan embarked on a two-week venue in Japan, while appearing in many interviews and media coverages there.

== Background and composition ==
Following the release of Unlocked in 2014, Stan commenced working on Alesta the subsequent year at a Romanian music camp organized by Romanian composer Marius Moga; there she collaborated with three recording studios simultaneously. The title of the record is an abbreviation of Stan's stage name, also meaning 'ready' in Turkish. The accompanying artwork for the Japanese and other versions of the album show Stan posing in front of a black backdrop, with lettering displayed in white or red above her head. Editions of Alesta released by Ego Records and Warner Bros. Records featured a photograph with her laying over a motorcycle sporting a blonde wig, white underwear and a distorted pair of blue jeans.

According to Stan's Italian label, Ego Records, the material from Alesta draws influence from Eastern and Western European music, which "confirms her as the undisputed queen of dance music made in Romania". Italian publication RnB Junk labelled the album as a dance record, comparing it to the singer's Unlocked, and stating that it incorporates elements of ethnic and Eastern European music "from other universes". When interviewed by Cosmopolitan, Stan confessed that her favorite track from the album was "Écoute", with every single track "telling a different story". In an interview with TV Groove, the singer felt that the "summerish" record had a "very danceable and partying vibe". According to Stan, most of the songs on Alesta are uptempo, and the album overall incorporates genres of electronic pop, dance and R&B music. The majority of the tracks are sung in English, with some songs performed in French, Romanian and Spanish, as well.

== Promotion ==
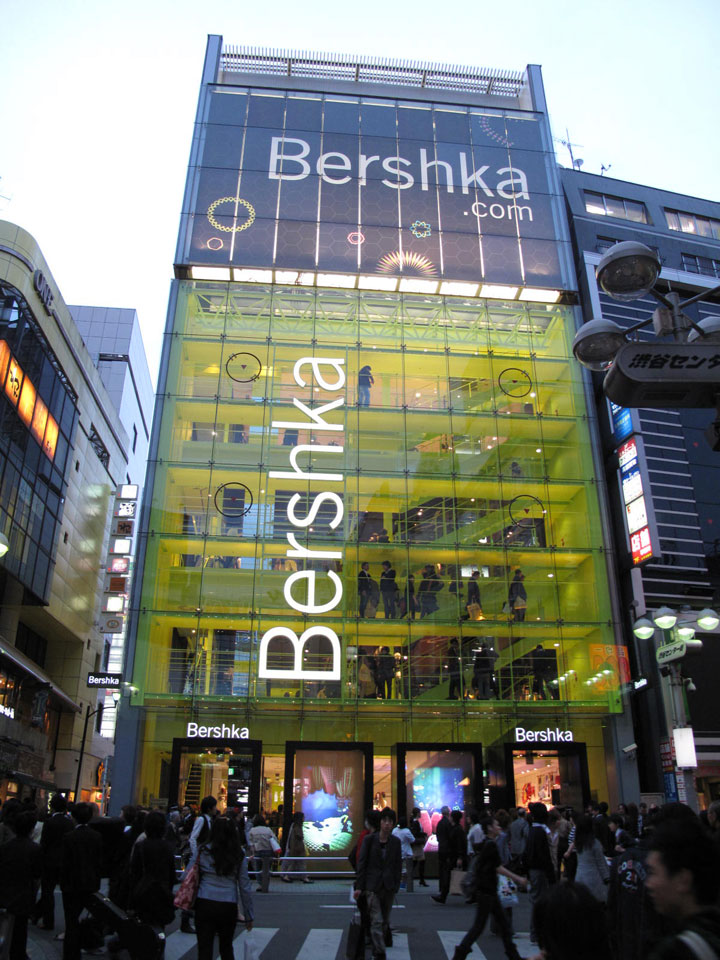
To promote the record, Stan performed in the vitrine of a Bershka shop in Tokyo, Japan (pictured).

To promote Alesta, Stan performed in Tokyo, Japan, in the vitrine of a Bershka shop, where she also released her clothes line, Alesta X Bershka. With this occasion, the singer hosted an autograph session and a press conference with Japanese magazines and televisions from Nagoya and Tokyo. Subsequently, Stan embarked on a two-week tour throughout Japan. Stan further performed material from the album at the 22nd Tokyo Girls Collection, Zippie Dance Party, YouTube Space Tokyo and YouTube Live during March 2016.

The first single from the record—"We Wanna"— was released on 8 June 2015 and featured the vocals of Romanian recording artist Inna and Puerto Rican reggaeton performer Daddy Yankee. With it being previously featured on the German edition of Stan's second studio album Unlocked, the track experienced commercial success when reaching the top 30 of the charts in Argentina, Poland and Turkey, and the top 60 in Italy, Romania and Slovakia. Subsequently, "I Did It, Mama!"—the second release off Alesta—became controversial in Romania because of scenes where Stan was portrayed miming the sexual intercourse with a male background dancer in its music video. While its lyrical message was compared to Madonna's "Papa Don't Preach" (1986) and its title to Delia Matache's "Da Mama" (2013), the recording charted at number nine on native Airplay 100.

The record's third and fourth singles were "Balans", a collaboration with Swedish-Congolese singer Mohombi, and "Écoute", featuring with Romanian band Havana; both songs benefited of a music video, with the clip for the latter single being filmed in Obârșia-Brezoi, the place where Stan spent her youth. "Balans" peaked on both Russia's Tophit and the Japanese Radio Chart at lower positions, and "Écoute" became a minor success in Europe. The fifth release from the album, "Boom Pow", was accompanied by a music video which was shot in her native Constanța and premiered on 24 August 2016, while "9 Lives", the last single, featured collaborative vocals from Bulgarian reggae performer Jahmmi.

== Track listings ==
Credits adapted from the liner notes of Alesta.

Alesta – International version
No.	Title	Writer(s)	Producer(s)	Length
1.	"I Did It, Mama!"	Marcel Botezan; Sebastian Barac; Julimar Santos Oliveira Neponuceno; Eric Turner; David Ciente; Alexandra Stan	Botezan; Barac; Ciente	3:25
2.	"We Wanna" (with Inna featuring Daddy Yankee)	Andreas Schuller; Jacob Luttrell; Thomas Troelsen; Ramon Ayala	Schuller; Troelsen	3:52
3.	"Balans" (featuring Mohombi)	Sebastian Barac; Marcel Botezan; Mohombi Nzasi Moupondo; Breyan Isaac	Barac; Botezan	3:10
4.	"Écoute" (featuring Havana)	Adriana Rusu; Sorin Seniuc; Ion Chirinciuc; Nadir Tamuz; Alexandra Ţîrţîrău	Chirinciuc	3:16
5.	"Get What You Give"	Sebastian Barac; Marcel Botezan; Laila Samuelsen	Barac; Botezan	3:02
6.	"Alone"	Marcel Botezan; Sebastian Barac; Andrew Frampton; Gabriel Benjamin	Botezan; Barac	4:00
7.	"La Fuega"	David Ciente; Trey Campbell	Ciente	2:53
8.	"Step It Up"	David Ciente; Alexandra Stan; Theea-Eliza-Ioana Miculescu	Ciente	2:56
9.	"Boom Pow"	David Ciente; Trey Campbell	Ciente	3:00
10.	"Coco Banana"	David Ciente; Nate Cyphert; Theea-Eliza-Ioana Miculescu	Ciente	2:42
11.	"9 Lives" (featuring Jahmmi)	Borislav Milanov; Sebastian Arman; Joacim Persson	Arman; Persson	3:51
Total length:				36:07

Japanese edition (Note: Following the release of Alesta in Japan, a deluxe edition of the album premiered in that territory, with it incorporating a DVD featuring the music videos and behind-the-stage material of "We Wanna" and "I Did It, Mama!".)
No.	Title	Writer(s)	Producer(s)	Length
1.	"Step It Up"			2:56
2.	"Get What You Give"			3:03
3.	"We Wanna" (with Inna featuring Daddy Yankee)			3:52
4.	"Alone"			3:57
5.	"Ecoute" (featuring Havana)			3:15
6.	"Balans" (featuring Mohombi)			3:09
7.	"Coco Banana"			2:42
8.	"I Did It, Mama!"			3:26
9.	"9 Lives"			3:39
10.	"La Fuega"			2:48
11.	"Boom Pow"			2:49
12.	"Motive" (Dorian featuring Alexandra Stan)	Andrei Mihai; Dorian Micu; Elena Moroşanu	Mihai	3:29
13.	"Baby, It's OK!" (Follow Your Instinct featuring Alexandra Stan)	Marcel Prodan; Marcian Alin Soare; David Ritter; Addis Mussa; Manuela Necker; Davon Dixon; Andrei Nemirschi; Rainer Wetenkamp; Patrick Greska	Wetenkamp; Ritter; Greska	3:23
Total length:				42:35

== Credits and personnel ==
Credits adapted from the liner notes of Alesta.

Vocal credits

- Alexandra Stan – lead vocals, featured artist
- Dorian – lead vocals
- Havana – featured artist
- Inna – featured artist
- Follow Your Instinct – lead vocals
- Jahmmi – featured artist
- Daddy Yankee – featured artist

Technical and composing credits

- Sebastian Arman – composer, producer
- Ramon Ayala – composer
- Sebastian Barac – composer, producer
- Gabriel Benjamin – composer
- Marcel Botezan – composer, producer
- Trey Campbell – composer
- Ion Chirinciuc – composer, producer
- David Ciente – composer, producer
- Nate Cyphert – composer
- Davon Dixon – composer
- Andrew Frampton – composer
- Patrick Greska – composer, producer
- Breyan Isaac – composer
- Jacob Luttrell – composer
- Theea-Eliza-Ioana Miculescu – composer
- Dorian Micu – composer
- Andrei Mihai – composer, producer
- Borislav Milanov – composer
- Mohombi Nzasi Moupondo – composer
- Elena Moroşanu – composer
- Addis Mussa – composer
- Manuela Necker – composer
- Julimar Santos Oliveira Neponuceno – composer
- Andrei Nemirschi – composer
- Joacim Persson – composer, producer
- Marcel Prodan – composer
- David Ritter – composer, producer
- Andreas Schuller – composer, producer
- Marcian Alin Soare – composer
- Adriana Rusu – composer
- Laila Samuelsen – composer
- Sorin Seniuc – composer
- Alexandra Stan – composer
- Nadir Tamuz – composer
- Alexandra Ţîrţîrău – composer
- Thomas Troelsen – composer, producer
- Eric Turner – composer
- Rainer Wetenkamp – composer, producer

== Charts ==
Chart performance for Alesta
Chart (2016)	Peak position
Japanese Albums (Oricon)	34

== Release ==
=== Process ===
Alesta was first released by Victor Entertainment in Japan on 9 March 2016; a deluxe version of the album premiered on the same day. Subsequently, on 16 March 2016, the record was made available for digital download in various other countries by Roton and Global Records, including Romania, France, Germany, Canada and the United Kingdom. In April 2016, Alesta was released in Russia, Chile and Peru, while its Italian release was on 8 July 2016 through Ego Records.

=== History ===
Release history and formats for Alesta
Region	Date	Label	Format(s)	Edition(s)
Japan	9 March 2016	Victor	Digital download/ CD/DVD	Standard
Japan	9 March 2016	Victor	Digital download/ CD/DVD	Deluxe
Romania	16 March 2016	Roton/ Global	Digital download	Standard
France	16 March 2016	Roton/ Global	Digital download	Standard
Germany	16 March 2016	Roton/ Global	Digital download	Standard
Canada	16 March 2016	Roton/ Global	Digital download	Standard
United Kingdom	16 March 2016	Roton/ Global	Digital download	Standard
Russia	18 April 2016	Roton	Digital download	Standard
Mexico	22 April 2016	Warner Bros.	Digital download	Standard
Chile	22 April 2016	Warner Bros.	Digital download	Standard
Peru	22 April 2016	Warner Bros.	Digital download	Standard
Italy	8 July 2016	Vae Victis/ Ego	Digital download	Standard

== See also ==
- List of music released by Romanian artists that has charted in major music markets
