= Alexandra Stan vs. Marcel Prodan =

2013 lawsuit in Romania

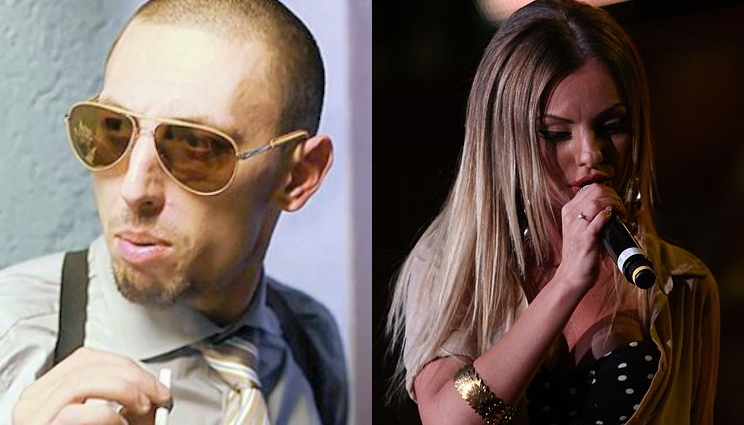
- Manager and producer Marcel Prodan along with singer and songwriter Alexandra Stan
- Court: Constanța
- Full case name: Alexandra Stan vs. Marcel Prodan
- Decided: 21 December 2016

Keywords
- Domestic violence

Alexandra Stan vs. Marcel Prodan was a 2013 Romanian lawsuit in which Romanian singer Alexandra Stan accused her impresario Marcel Prodan and his label Maan Studio of blackmail, bodily harm, common assault and robbery. In June 2013, Stan and Prodan were travelling in a car on Autostrada Soarelui between Constanța and Valu lui Traian. Members of the Romanian traffic police found them fighting on the shoulder of the motorway; Stan's face was visibly bruised and she was taken to the hospital. She later appeared on national television, generating media attention in Romania.

According to the singer, the incident occurred after she asked Prodan for her earnings, to which he reacted violently. Several hearings in Constanța Court were scheduled as part of the lawsuit; during one, Prodan testified that he had acted in self-defense after Stan hit him in his car and threatened to commit suicide. While Stan's accusations of blackmail and bodily harm were deemed groundless by the judges in 2014, Prodan received a seven-month suspended sentence for common assault in February 2016 and was fined damages.

On appeal from both sides, the case was handed over to Constanța Court of Appeal under the case number 5946/212/2015. On 21 December 2016, the court denied Stan's accusations due to the lack of evidence; however, Prodan's sentence was confirmed and his fines increased to €25,000. Music critics noted the impact of the legal case on the singer's later work. Furthermore, Stan initiated the anti-domestic violence campaign Nu bate! Mai bine cântă! (Don't hit! Better sing!) in late 2013.

== Background and lawsuit initiation ==
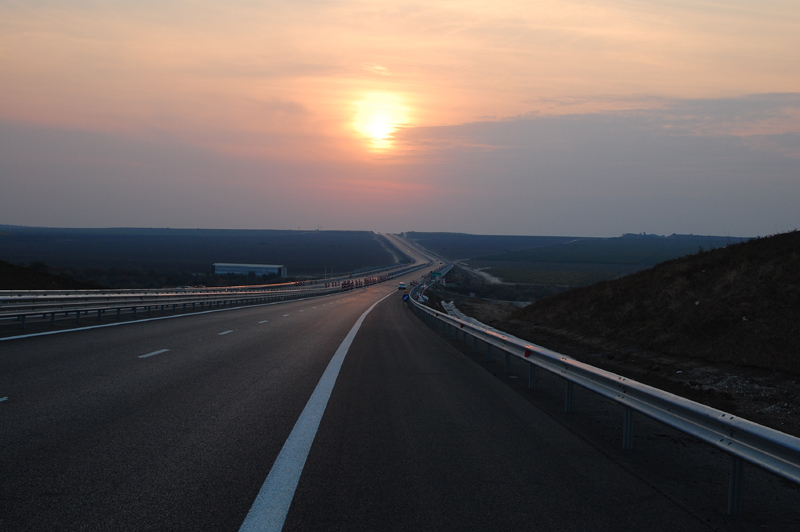
Autostrada Soarelui (pictured in 2011), where a bruised Stan was picked up by local traffic police

In 2009, Romanian singer Alexandra Stan was discovered by producers and songwriters Marcel Prodan and Andrei Nemirschi, who offered her a record deal with their label, Maan Records. In 2010, Stan's breakthrough single "Mr. Saxobeat" topped the Romanian Top 100 chart for several consecutive weeks, and also reached number one in Austria, Denmark, Germany, Hungary, Israel, Italy, Slovakia, Switzerland and Turkey.

According to spokesmen for Poliţia Judeţeană Constanţa (Constanţa County Police Department), members of Poliția Rutieră (traffic police) picked up Stan from Autostrada Soarelui (Sun Motorway) on 16 June 2013 at about 19:00 (EET). Policemen saw the singer and Prodan fighting in a car on the shoulder of the motorway; Stan had facial bruises, which served as visible evidence of physical assault, and was subsequently taken to Spitalul Clinic Judeţean de Urgenţă Constanţa (Constanța County Emergency Hospital). Shortly after, Stan also appeared on Romanian television, attracting media coverage in the country.

During her hospitalization, Stan filed a lawsuit against Prodan and Maan Studio for blackmail, bodily harm, common assault and robbery at Constanța court. Additionally, she insisted that a message posted on her social media saying that she would cancel concerts due to a traffic accident had been posted by Prodan and was untrue. According to Stan, Prodan beat her to intimidate her about demanding her earnings from concerts, a reported total of €40,000. Retrospectively, in a 2021 interview, the singer revealed that Prodan and Nemirschi had lied to her on numerous occasions about her concert incomes early into her career and rewarded her poorly. Additionally, she recalled tensions with the aforementioned two upon reproaching both the aforementioned unorthodox business practices and the contract she had signed with them, which Stan claims disrespected human rights and was written in a way so that Prodan and Nemirschi could have widespread control over her.

== Court proceedings and outcome ==
In June 2014, judges deemed Stan's accusations of blackmail groundless. Furthermore, the singer's claims of bodily harm were denied in the November of the same year due to the lack of physical evidence. In June 2015, a preliminary hearing of Stan and Prodan's case was held. According to Prodan, the incident begun in his recording studio when he told Stan that she had sung poorly. Prodan alleged that Stan did not want to leave the building and reacted aggressively to him pushing her towards the exit. When describing the events in his car, Prodan said Stan had begun kicking him; he defended himself, slapping her when she jerked the steering wheel. Prodan testified that Stan had said she wanted to commit suicide and opened the door to jump out of the car; he grabbed her hand and stopped. Conversely, Stan said Prodan threw her into his car and struck her multiple times. In shock, she jerked the wheel to get out of the car. Further hearings with witnesses were scheduled to take place in September 2015.

At a follow-up hearing in December 2015, Stan demanded around €1 million in damages from Prodan. Among those who testified was Andrei Nemirschi, Prodan's collaborator at Maan Studio. On 19 February 2016, Prodan received a seven-month suspended sentence for common assault and was ordered to pay Stan €193 for medical care and €10,000 in damages. Dissatisfied with the outcome, both Stan and Prodan made appeals, resulting in the case being handed over to Curtea de Apel Constanța (Constanța Court of Appeal) on 9 June 2016. The court ruled that there was insufficient evidence to support the accusations made by the singer. It was reported in late November 2016 that, while Stan was assessed €500 in court costs, Prodan's sentence for assault was confirmed and his required compensation to Stan increased to €25,000. That decision was finalized on 21 December 2016.

== Reception and aftermath ==
In a 2021 interview, Stan said she was dissatisfied with the lawsuit's outcome since she felt that Prodan's sentence did not equate to his felony and its negative impact on her career. She also alleged that Prodan owed her an estimated €2 million, and expressed displeasure about the €25,000 in damages she received because they came near to the court-related costs she had to pay. Furthermore, the singer criticized Romania's judicial system for treating her case with a lack of seriousness, saying the she was "fighting the system on her own". Romanian commentator Mircea Toma observed that the incident was treated "in a derisory way" by Romanian media, writing that "[a] woman who is beaten is [the] subject of irony, something sensationalist and the violence itself is not condemned". However, Toma saw the legal case as a "good opportunity for society to debate domestic violence." The incident and its media coverage resulted in national discussions related to and in tightening the Romanian law concerning the restraining order in situations involving domestic violence.

Stan received widespread support on social media. The incident was noted to be the source of inspiration for the singer's follow-up work. Her song "Thanks for Leaving" (2014) reportedly discusses her recovery, while the title of "9 Lives" (2017) alludes to the event; according to Gheorghe Chelu of Click! magazine, "no trouble has ever managed to bring [Stan] down". In late 2013, the singer launched the anti-domestic violence campaign Nu bate! Mai bine cântă! (Don't hit! Better sing!), and was part of Pro TV's campaign Femeia ca o pradă (The woman as prey) in September 2019.
