= We Wanna =

2015 single by Inna and Alexandra Stan

Single by Alexandra Stan and Inna featuring Daddy Yankee

from the album Alesta, Inna, Unlocked and Nirvana
- Released: 8 June 2015
- Genre: Dance-pop
- Length: 3:52
- Label: Roton; Fonogram; Global
- Songwriter(s): Ramon Ayala; Jacob Luttrell; Andreas Schuller; Thomas Troelsen
- Producer(s): Schuller; Troelsen

Alexandra Stan singles chronology
"Vanilla Chocolat" (2014)	"We Wanna" (2015)	"I Did It, Mama!" (2015)

Inna singles chronology
"Diggy Down" (2014)	"We Wanna" (2015)	"Bop Bop" (2015)

Daddy Yankee singles chronology
"Sígueme y Te Sigo" (2015)	"We Wanna" (2015)	"Corazón" (2015)

Music video
- "We Wanna" on YouTube

"We Wanna" is a song by Romanian singers Alexandra Stan and Inna, the first single from Stan's third studio album, Alesta (2016). Featuring the vocal collaboration of Puerto Rican performer Daddy Yankee, it was made available for digital consumption on 8 June 2015 through Roton, Fonogram and Global Records. The track was written by Ramon Ayala, Jacob Luttrell, Andreas Schuller and Thomas Troelsen, while being produced by Schuller and Troelsen. Musically, "We Wanna" is a dance-pop song inspired by 90s electro music and Paul Johnson's "Get Get Down" (1999), whose lyrics delve on themes such as enjoyment and partying. It was solely intended for Inna, but it was then offered to Stan in order to relaunch in the music industry.

An accompanying music video for the single—directed by Khaled Mokhtar, Dimitri Caceaune and David Gal in both Romania and Puerto Rico—premiered on Stan's YouTube channel on 8 June 2015; it portrays the singers residing in a party hall. Music critics generally acclaimed the recording, praising its melody, chorus, and commercial appeal. Commercially, the song experienced moderate success, reaching the top ten in Argentina and Germany's Black Charts, while peaking within the top forty in Poland, Slovakia and Turkey. It was also certified Gold by the Federazione Industria Musicale Italiana (FIMI) for selling over 25,000 units in Italy. "We Wanna" was promoted by various live performances during Stan's concert tours that supported Alesta, but was also sung in a stripped-down version for Romanian radio station Pro FM.

== Background ==
When asked in an interview with Direct Lyrics about the possibility of a collaboration with Inna in July 2014, Stan said that, "Yes, I do know Inna; we've met at different concerts and other events! I really respect what she's been doing lately and would definitely be open to a collaboration!" On 18 October 2014, Inna uploaded a video on her YouTube channel called "New Music Preview (2014)", where she teased six upcoming songs, including a demo version of "We Wanna", which incorporated some modified lyrics, and did only feature Inna's vocals. It was eventually speculated that the track has been originally composed for her, but she accepted parting the recording with Stan in order to relaunch her in the music industry. About their collaboration, the latter singer stated that, "I think we are like a delicious vanilla-chocolate milkshake, which you simply cannot get enough from." "We Wanna" was made available for digital download on 8 June 2015—near Stan's birthday on 10 June—through Roton, Fonogram and Global Records. Besides of being featured on Stan's third studio album, Alesta (2016), the song was also added to the track list of some editions of Unlocked (2014), Inna (2015) and Nirvana (2018). Pitbull had sent in a rap verse to be featured on "We Wanna", but it was eventually rejected in favor of one by Daddy Yankee.

== Composition ==
"We Wanna"
A 24-second sample of "We Wanna", a dance-pop song inspired by 90s electro music and Paul Johnson's "Get Get Down" (1999).

"We Wanna" was written by Ramon Ayala, Jacob Luttrell, Andreas Schuller and Thomas Troelsen, while being produced by Schuller and Troelsen. The song is an upbeat dance-pop recording inspired by 90s electro music and Paul Johnson's "Get Get Down" (1999); it makes use of saxophones. Lyrically, the track was described by music website Idolator to discuss on "letting your hair down and having a good time"; when interviewed, Stan confessed that its message is about "summer, partying and feeling good".

Lasting three minutes and fifty-two seconds, it begins with Stan singing its chorus and the first strophe, following which she further provides vocals for the mainpart. Next, Inna performs the second burden of the single, and the refrain repeats until Yankee makes a rap-cameo. Music website Pop Shock felt the recording leaned "more towards Alexandra's recent output than Inna's heavier dance sound."

== Reception ==
Upon its release, "We Wanna" was met with positive to mixed reviews by music critics. Henry Einck, writing for German music website Dance Charts, praised the song's "pleasant" melody, which he described as being "suitable for dancing". Additionally, Einck was positive towards Stan's, Inna's and Yankee's vocal parts, but felt they didn't match together. Direct Lyrics's Kevin Apaza labelled the recording as a "future-European-summer-smash", and saw its drop as "going to cause some fierce-dancing moments at clubs". Bradley Stern from MuuMuse felt "We Wanna" was a "super solid, club-ready summer jam bound to blow up from Argentina to Morocco, full of catchy hooks ('Bout to go!') and infectiously sax-y sax noises borrowed from the home of Mr. Saxobeat." He eventually found Stan and Inna outperformed Rihanna and Shakira, and Lady Gaga and Beyoncé, who previously formed female duos. Mike Wass, writing for Idolator, expressed that the track was "a guilty pleasure of the highest order". German portal Hitfire was generally positive towards "We Wanna", explaining that its "verses are disappointingly quiet until the chorus turns up something. Nevertheless, [the refrain] is after a few plays a catchy tune that you want to hear again and again." Music website Pop Shock's Dijei Zasin criticized Yankee's vocal collaboration on the single for "unnecessary [slowing] down the song", suggesting that American rapper Pitbull would be an option to feature on a version of "We Wanna" destined to the United Kingdom and the United States. He further concluded that, "What works here are the verses laced in the singers’ trademark attitude, contrasting with the vibey, chilled chorus."

"We Wanna" experienced moderate commercial success after its release. It entered the Romanian Airplay 100 on 21 June 2015 at number 66, becoming the highest new entry. The next week, the recording jumped to number 60, and back down to number 64 on 5 July 2015; it reached its peak position at number 59 on 19 July 2015. The track opened the Slovak Singles Chart at number 39, and dropped down to number 43 for the next two weeks. "We Wanna" debuted at number 100 on the Czech Singles Chart, moving on 28 positions up the following week, reaching number 72. In Argentina, the recording peaked at number five on 17 October 2015, while further reaching the top twenty on Germany's Black Charts, Poland and Turkey. It was certified Gold by the Federazione Industria Musicale Italiana (FIMI) for moving over 25,000 units in Italy.

== Music video ==
A shot from the music video, featuring Inna (left) and Stan (right) standing close to each other in front of a red backdrop and a cactus.

A music video for the song was uploaded onto Stan's YouTube channel on 8 June 2015. It was previewed by Romanian publication Cancan, which published behind-the-scenes footage on 13 May 2015; three additional teasers preceded its premiere. The visual was shot in Puerto Rico and Romania by Khaled Mokhtar, Dimitri Caceaune and David Gal, with whom both Stan and Inna had collaborated with in the past. The choreography used in the clip was done by Emil Rengle and Cristian Miron.

The video opens with Inna answering to a call she gets from Stan on her Lenovo smartphone, of which the ringtone is the saxophone riff featured in the song. Subsequently, both are presented standing close to each other in front of a red backdrop and a cactus. The next scene portrays Stan and some backup dancers hanging out in the dressing room of a club, with her eventually going downstairs to the full party hall and later meeting Inna there. Next, Yankee makes a cameo appearance in the clip, followed by both singers performing a synchronized choreography. The video ends in the same way it opens. Cut scenes portray Yankee, Stan and Inna singing and dancing to the song in front of yellow, green and blue backdrops, Inna performing to the club's crowd or Stan dancing on a runaway.

Bradley Stern from MuuMuse praised the singers' posing, dancing, make up and hair styling throughout the visual. Idolator's Mike Wass felt the clip featured "raunchy outfits" and "dubious dance moves". Website Hitfire explained that the music video revalued the song, further pointing out the absence of a plot, but naming it "worth seeing".

== Live performances ==
The song was included on the set list for all concert tours that promoted Stan's Alesta, but was also used by Inna for several other venues. The singers performed "We Wanna" live for the first time together on 17 October 2015 in Italy at Discoteca Le Rotonde. They further sang a stripped-down version of the recording for Romanian radio station Pro FM on 9 June 2016, while additionally uploading a video on Stan's YouTube channel that sees them performing the song live at Parcul Herăstrău, Romania.

== Credits and personnel ==
Credits adapted from the liner notes of Alesta and The Collection.

Vocal credits

- Alexandra Stan – lead vocals
- Inna – featured artist
- Daddy Yankee – featured artist

Technical and composing credits

- Ramon Ayala – composer
- Jacob Luttrell – composer
- Andreas Schuller – composer, producer
- Thomas Troelsen – composer, producer

Visual credits

- Dimitri Caceaune – director
- David Gal – director
- Cristian Miron – choreographer
- Khaled Mokhtar – regisor
- Emil Rengle – choreographer

== Track listing ==
Official versions (Note: This acts as a summary of all versions of the single released worldwide.)

1. "We Wanna" (featuring Daddy Yankee) – 3:52
2. "We Wanna" (Menegatti & Fatrix Remix Radio Edit) – 3:09
3. "We Wanna" (XP & Ellis Colin Miami Rmx Radio Edit) – 2:50
4. "We Wanna" (Chiavistelli & Bonetti ReWork Radio Edit) – 3:42
5. "We Wanna" (Alex Molla DJ & Malanga vs. Garofalo Radio Club Edit Remix) – 3:30
6. "We Wanna" (Menegatti & Fatrix Remix) – 4:01
7. "We Wanna" (XP & Ellis Colin Miami Rmx) – 3:52
8. "We Wanna" (Chiavistelli & Bonetti ReWork) – 4:30
9. "We Wanna" (Alex Molla DJ & Malanga vs. Garofalo Club Extended Remix) – 5:30
10. "We Wanna" (Summer Session) – 2:50

== Charts ==
Chart	Peak position
Argentina (Los 40 Principales)	5
Czech Republic (Rádio – Top 100)	72
Germany (Deutsche Black Charts)	2
Italy (FIMI)	60
Japan (Japan Hot 100) (Billboard)	72
Poland (Polish Airplay Top 100)	13
Romania (Airplay 100)	59
Slovakia (Rádio Top 100)	39
Spain (PROMUSICAE)	83
Turkey (Number One Top 40)	15

== Certifications ==
Region	Certification	Certified units/sales
Italy (FIMI)	Gold	25,000^{‡}
^{‡} Sales+streaming figures based on certification alone.

== Release and radio history ==
Release dates and formats for "We Wanna"
Region	Date	Version	Format(s)	Label	Ref.
Various	8 June 2015	Original	Digital download; streaming	Roton; Fonogram; Global	
United States	10 June 2015	Original	Digital download; streaming	Fonogram; Global	
Italy	26 June 2015	Original	Digital download; streaming	Vae Victis; Ego	
Italy	3 July 2015	Original	Radio airplay	Ego	
Italy	28 July 2015	Remix EP	Radio airplay	Ego	
Italy	31 July 2015	Remix EP	Digital download; streaming	Vae Victis; Ego	
Italy	2 October 2015	Summer Session	Digital download; streaming	Vae Victis; Ego	
Japan	15 July 2015	Original	Digital download; streaming	Roton; Fonogram; Global	

== See also ==
- List of music released by Romanian artists that has charted in major music markets
