= Corazón (Claudia Leitte song) =

2015 single by Claudia Leitte

Single by Claudia Leitte featuring Daddy Yankee
- Released: December 17, 2015
- Genre: Latin pop; dance-pop
- Length: 4:05
- Label: Roc Nation
- Songwriter(s): Antonio Rayo Gibo; Beatriz Luengo; Yotuel Romero; Raymond Ayala; Derrus Rachel

Claudia Leitte singles chronology
"Sinais" (2015)	"Corazón" (2015)	"Shiver Down My Spine" (2016)

Daddy Yankee singles chronology
"We Wanna" (2015)	"Corazón" (2015)	"Andas en Mi Cabeza" (2015)

"Corazón" is a song recorded by Brazilian singer Claudia Leitte featuring Daddy Yankee. The track was written by Antonio Rayo Gibo, Beatriz Luengo, Yotuel Romero, Raymond Ayala and Derrus Rachel. "Corazón" is a Latin-pop and reggaeton, backed by lightly clicking percussion, the song was released on December 17, 2015 on TIDAL and iTunes. "Corazón" won the award for Best Latin Collaboration of the Year at the 2016 Latin Music Italian Awards and also won a 2017 Billboard poll for Best Portuguese/Spanish collaboration.

== Background ==
Leitte went to New York in December 2013 where Jay Brown presented her the song, though she took almost two years to release it due to being hesitant at first about recording in Spanish. After making some adjustments in production and adding more Brazilian elements to the final mix, she decided to use the track.

== Live performances ==
Leitte and Yankee gave their first televised rendition of "Corazón" on The Voice Brasil, on December 19, 2015.

== Music video ==
The video was shot in Praia Vermelha, in the city of Rio de Janeiro, and between 15 and 16 December 2015. Shooting took between 10 and 23 hours. The designer Giovanni Frasson was responsible for all of Leitte's costumes in the video. During an interview on Baiana FM on January 8, 2016, Leitte gave some details from the video, defining it as the sexiest of her career.

Leitte announced on Twitter that the music video would be released on January 28. In addition to the announcement, she released two shots from the video. On January 27, Leitte's website begun a countdown to the launch for the video launch. A making-of of it was released that same day on social media.

The website Glamurama released an exclusive video clip of a Leitte photoshoot by Rachel Tanugi Ribas, and announced that the music video was directed by Marcos Mello, a Brazilian pioneer director in fashion film.

== Release history ==
Country	Date	Format	Label	Ref.
Brazil	December 17, 2015	Digital download	Roc Nation	
Brazil	December 17, 2015	Streaming	Roc Nation	
