= I Did It, Mama! =

Single by Alexandra Stan

from the album Alesta
- Released: 27 November 2015
- Genre: Europop; reggaeton; eurodance; dance-pop
- Length: 3:25
- Label: Global; Ego
- Songwriter(s): Marcel Botezan; Sebastian Barac; Julimar Santos Oliveira Neponuceno; Eric Turner; David Ciente; Alexandra Stan
- Producer(s): Play & Win; Ciente

Alexandra Stan singles chronology
| "We Wanna" (2015) | "I Did It, Mama!" (2015) | "Balans" (2016) |

Music video
- "I Did It, Mama!" on YouTube

"I Did It, Mama!" is a song recorded by Romanian singer-songwriter Alexandra Stan for her third studio album, Alesta (2016). Released on 27 November 2015 through Global Records as a single, the track was produced by Play & Win members Sebastian Barac and Marcel Botezan, and David Ciente. The writing process was handled by the latter three in collaboration with Stan, Eric Turner and Julimar Santos Oliveira Neponuceno. A europop, reggaeton, eurodance and dance-pop song incorporating Balcanic and ethnic influences, the record was described as resembling the lyrical message of Madonna's "Papa Don't Preach".

"I Did It, Mama!" was met with mixed reviews, with some music critics calling it "an earworm" and "great", while others named it "boring" and unfriendly for radio airplay. An official music video for "I Did It, Mama!" was shot by Bogdan Daragiu and uploaded in November 2015 onto YouTube in order to accompany the single's release. The clip presents Stan being surrounded by different types of half-naked men, and aroused controversy for cut scenes where she is shown miming sexual intercourse and oral sex with one of her background dancers. Commercially, the track peaked at number nine in Stan's native country.

== Composition and lyrical interpretation ==
"I Did It, Mama!"
A 20-second sample, portraying Stan employing her parents to accept her boyfriend in the first strophe. Subsequently, she stands her ground by repeating the phrase "I did it, mama!".

The song was written by Marcel Botezan, Sebastian Barac, J-Son, Eric Turner, David Ciente and Stan, while production was handled by both Botezan and Barac under their alias Play & Win, and Ciente. Lyrically, "I Did It, Mama!" is about the "conflict between different generations, more specific between children and their parents". Throughout the lyrics, Stan urges her parents to accept her misunderstood new boyfriend. However, with the refrain of the song, she stands her ground, repeating the track's title several times. Bradely Stern, writing for music website Pop Crush, compared the message of the song to that of Madonna's "Papa Don't Preach" (1986), while Stan herself confessed that "[the song] is a more rebellious recording that parents may not understand from the first play". She has, as well, named the tune a mixture between europop, reggaeton and Balkanic music. Hitfire described "I Did, It Mama!" as a "successful" dance-pop track, and Gay Times named it a "eurodance banger". Carlo Andriani of Italian portal Daring To Do pointed out ethnic influences featured into its composition.

== Critical reception ==
Upon its release, the track was met with mixed reviews from music critics. Hitfire praised the refrain and the strophes of the tune, but criticized its drop and main part, confessing that they "destroy the song a little bit". Spanish music website Melty eventually named the recording "great", foreseeing it successful in European clubs. Daring To Do provided a negative review for "I Did It, Mama!", saying that it was "boring" and confessing that its radio potential was "below zero". Romanian magazine Libertatea compared the song's title to that of Delia Matache's "Da, Mama". RnB Junk described the song as "powerful".

== Music video and promotion ==
Critics noted Stan's mime of sexual intercourse (pictured) with a fellow dancer during the music video.

An accompanying music video shot by Bogdan Daragiu for the song was released on 25 November 2015 onto Stan's YouTube channel. Stan, particularly, confessed that "at the filming of the clip, [she] felt very good, like an absolute goddess, with a lot of males teeming around [her] for 24 hours". For the video, several men were employed, such as models, motorcyclists and rugby players from CSA Steaua București. The clip commences with some motorcyclists arriving at an abandoned place, followed by Stan lying on a plastic horse in a neon-lightened room and singing the first strophe in front of the rugby players. Subsequently, she is shown scattered on the ground of a dark room, with half-naked men sporting white fishnet tights and boots appearing from her left and right. After she and the fellow males perform to the song, the clip ends with Stan being left alone on the horse from the beginning. Scenes interspersed through the main video portray her posing in front of a blue wall, sporting black sun glasses and cross-styled earrings.

The clip received mostly positive reviews, with Pop Crush calling the dresses displayed in it "a campy European mixture of ’20s flapper style/old Hollywood glamour in fringe". Hitfire recommended the video, which they called "a feast for both genders". Romanian newspapers Cancan and Click! pointed out cut scenes that portray Stan's miming of sexual intercourse and oral sex with a fellow dancer, which, according to them, would have been a reason for the clip to be banned in Romania. Melty named the video "provocant", while Daring To Do was negative towards it, commending "it presents scenes [they've] already seen countless times, leaving the viewer annoyed with a feeling of déjà vu".

Stan included "I Did It, Mama!" on the track list for her Japanese one-week concert tours that promoted the release of her studio album, Alesta, in that territory. She also performed a stripped-down version of the song on Romanian radio station Pro FM. Romanian singer, dancer and moderator George Papagheorghe impersonated Stan and covered the track on native interactive talent show Te cunosc de undeva!.

== Credits and personnel ==
Credits adapted from the liner notes of Alesta.

Technical and songwriting credits

- Alexandra Stan – songwriter
- Julimar Santos Oliveira Neponuceno – songwriter
- Eric Turner – songwriter
- David Ciente – songwriter, producer
- Marcel Botezan – songwriter, producer
- Sebastian Barac – songwriter, producer

Vocal credits

- Alexandra Stan – lead vocals

Visual credits

- Bogdan Daragiu – video director, director of photography

== Track listing ==
- Digital download
1. "I Did It Mama" – 3:25
- Digital remix EP (Note: The Italian digital remix EP featured the same tracks in a different order, with an extended version of the track acting as a bonus title.)
1. "I Did It Mama" (Jack Mazzoni remix) – 4:26
2. "I Did It Mama" (Jack Mazzoni radio remix) – 3:23
3. "I Did It Mama" (Franques remix) – 4:20
4. "I Did It Mama" (Franques extended mix) – 5:08
5. "I Did It Mama" (Fedo Mora & Oki Doro remix) – 4:30
6. "I Did It Mama" (Fedo Mora & Oki Doro radio remix) – 3:20
7. "I Did It Mama" (Matthew Bee radio remix) – 3:32
8. "I Did It Mama" (Matthew Bee remix) – 4:41

== Charts ==
| Chart | Peak position |
|---|---|
| Romania (Airplay 100) | 9 |

== Release ==
=== Process ===
"I Did It, Mama" was released digitally worldwide on 27 November 2015 on iTunes through Global and Ego labels. Subsequently, a remixes EP was made available for purchase on 7 January 2016 and 15 January in European territories. The cover artwork for the Italian extended play featured the blue coloring from the original one being edited to green, while the sleeve for the other releases featured it changed to red. Ego sent the track to Italian radio stations on 4 December 2015.

=== History ===
| Territory | Date | Label |
Digital single
| Brasil | 27 November 2015 | Global |
| Denmark | 27 November 2015 | Global |
| Germany | 27 November 2015 | Global |
| Italy | 27 November 2015 | Ego |
| Netherlands | 27 November 2015 | Global |
| Portugal | 27 November 2015 | Global |
| Romania | 27 November 2015 | Global |
| Russia | 27 November 2015 | Global |
| Sweden | 27 November 2015 | Global |
| United States | 27 November 2015 | Global |

| Territory | Date | Label |
Radio airplay
| Italy | 4 December 2015 | Ego |

| Territory | Date | Label |
Digital remixes EP
| Brasil | 7 January 2016 | Global |
| Denmark | 7 January 2016 | Global |
| Germany | 7 January 2016 | Global |
| Italy | 15 January 2016 | Ego |
| Netherlands | 7 January 2016 | Global |
| Portugal | 7 January 2016 | Global |
| Romania | 7 January 2016 | Global |
| Russia | 7 January 2016 | Global |
| Sweden | 7 January 2016 | Global |
| United States | 7 January 2016 | Global |
