= Alexandra Stan =

Romanian singer (born 1989)

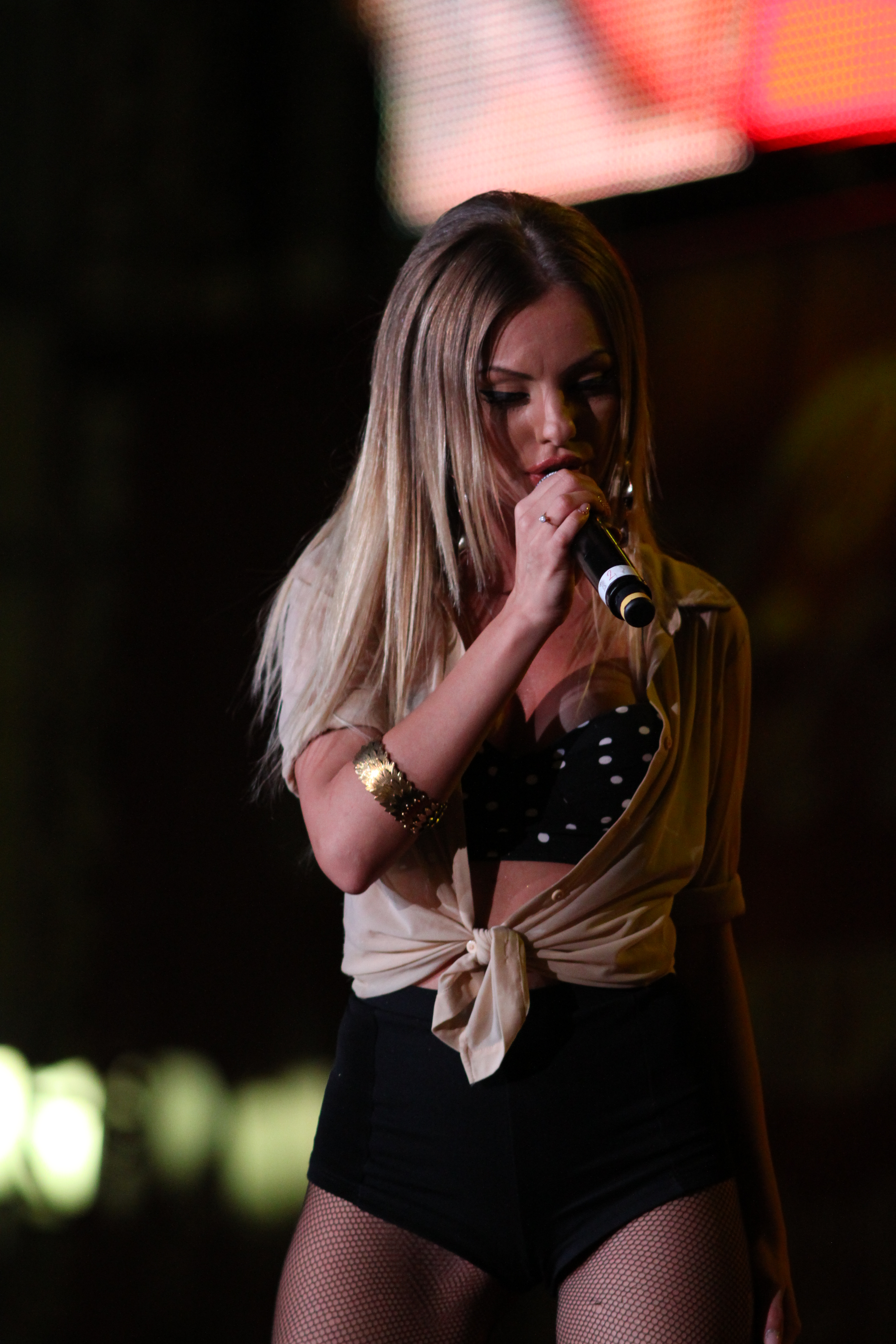
- Stan during a 2012 Sofia performance
- Born: Alexandra Ioana Stan; 10 June 1989 (age 37); Constanța, Romania
- Occupations: Singer; songwriter
- Years active: 2009–present
- Works: Discography
- Musical career
- Genres: Popcorn; Eurodance
- Labels: Alexandra Stan; MediaPro; Ultra; Universal; Victor, Columbia, Sony
- Website: www.alexandra-stan.com

Alexandra Ioana Stan (born 10 June 1989) is a Romanian singer. Born in Constanța, she made her worldwide breakthrough with the 2010 single "Mr. Saxobeat", which was written and produced by Marcel Prodan and Andrei Nemirschi. They had previously discovered Stan at a karaoke bar in 2009 and signed her to their label, Maan Records. "Mr. Saxobeat" had followed the singer's debut single, "Lollipop (Param Pam Pam)" (2009), which brought her moderate fame in Romania. Saxobeats, Stan's debut studio album, was released in August 2011 and features the follow-up singles "Get Back (ASAP)" (2011) and "Lemonade" (2012), which had moderate success in Europe.

An alleged altercation with Prodan in 2013 and a lawsuit against him preceded the release of Stan's second album, Unlocked, which would eventually be issued in August 2014. Two of its singles, "Dance" (2014) and "Cherry Pop" (2014), were successful in Japan. Stan's third studio album, Alesta, was released in March 2016 and included a collaboration with Inna and Daddy Yankee on "We Wanna" (2015); the single went on to reach the top 60 in several countries. Mami, her fourth record, followed in 2018. Preceding the release of its last single was Stan's feature on Manuel Riva's "Miami" (2018), which peaked within the top ten in Romania and on Billboard's Dance Club Songs chart, her fifth studio album Rainbows was released in 2022.

Stan has received a number of awards and nominations, including the European Border Breakers Award, a Japan Gold Disc Award, an MTV Europe Music Award and two Romanian Music Awards. She is also referred to as one of the most successful Romanian artists alongside Inna.

== Life and career ==
=== 1989–2009: Early life and career beginnings ===
Alexandra Ioana Stan was born on 10 June 1989 in Constanța, Romania, to Daniela and George Stan, and has a sister, Andreea, who is three years older. Stan's father used to work as a cook on a ship and was thus absent for a large part of her childhood in the Faleză Nord neighbourhood, which she stated had a large emotional impact on her. In 2005, her family experienced financial problems due to her father's deteriorating health condition and moved to the Valu lui Traian commune, where Stan earned money as a waitress. She recalls having self-esteem issues and being bullied by classmates for being poor, for which she eventually had post-traumatic stress disorder (PTSD) therapy.

Showing an interest in music from a very young age, Stan studied at the Traian Secondary School and later at the Faculty of Management Andrei Șaguna, but dropped out of the latter in favour of pursuing a music career. Her public singing debut was at a Romanian televised show when she was 15 years old. She eventually participated in various music contests, including the Mamaia Music Festival in 2009. Romanian producers and songwriters Marcel Prodan and Andrei Nemirschi discovered Stan that year at a karaoke bar in Constanța and signed her to their record label, Maan Records. Retrospectively, in a 2021 interview, Stan claimed that the contract disrespected human rights and was written in a way so that Prodan and Nemirschi could have a widespread control over her. According to Stan, her reproaching of this matter and the alleged underpayment she was facing to them resulted in several tensions. Stan rose to moderate fame and began being booked for concerts in Romania with the release of her debut single "Lollipop (Param Pam Pam)" (2009), which was given notable radio airplay. Stan's father was involved in her management for two years early in her career.

=== 2010–2014: Saxobeats, Marcel Prodan lawsuit and Unlocked ===
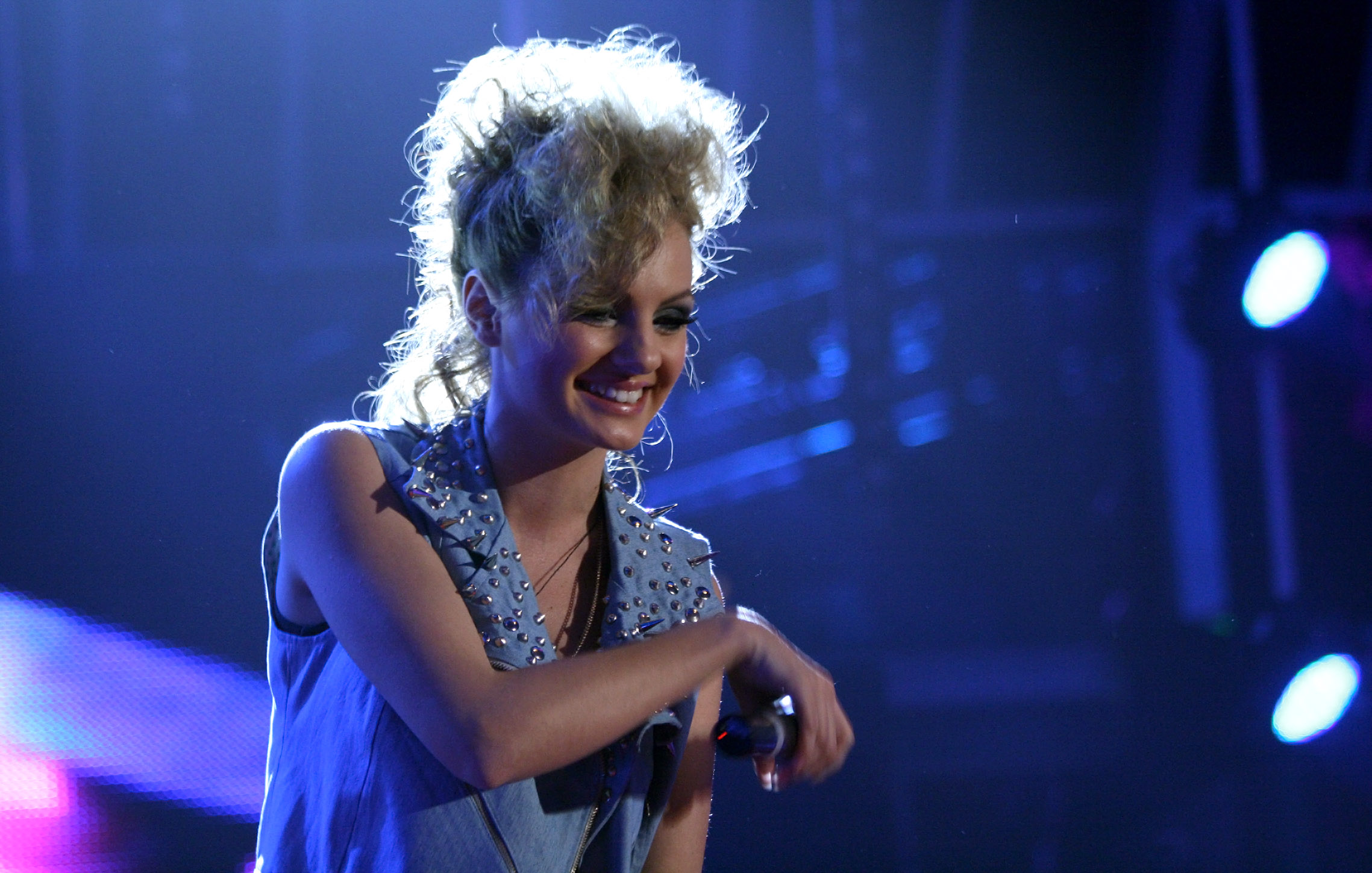
Stan at the Austrian Sports Personality of the Year awards in 2011

In 2010, Stan released her international breakthrough single "Mr. Saxobeat". The song first achieved success in Romania, where it peaked at number one on the Romanian Top 100 for eight consecutive weeks. It then became acclaimed worldwide, topping the record charts in several other countries, and selling almost one million copies in less than year. It has also received various Music recording certifications, including Platinum by the Recording Industry Association of America (RIAA). "Mr. Saxobeat" was part of a broader movement in which several Romanian popcorn songs would experience success internationally, promopting the genre to become mainstream. At the 2011 Romanian Music Awards, Stan and "Mr. Saxobeat" won several awards and received nominations. Stan also won the Best Romanian Act and was nominated for Best European Act at the 2011 MTV Europe Music Awards. In November 2020, "Mr. Saxobeat" reached 200 million streams on Spotify, making it the most streamed song by a Romanian artist on the platform.

After the success of "Mr. Saxobeat", Stan released the follow-up single "Get Back (ASAP)" (2011), which achieved modest success, reaching the top 10 in Finland and Romania and the top 20 in other European countries. The singer's debut studio album Saxobeats was released in August 2011; it was moderately successful in Japan and Europe. For Stan's international achievements in 2011, she won a European Border Breaker award. Her chart success followed into 2012 with "Lemonade", which was certified Gold in Italy. An alleged violent incident between Stan and Prodan and a resulting lawsuit which attracted widespread media coverage in Romania occurred in June 2013. The singer was hospitalized with visible bruises and accused Prodan of blackmail, bodily harm, common assault and robbery. While on a musical hiatus, the collaborative single "Baby, It's OK" with German group Follow Your Instinct was released in August 2013 and fared moderately well in German-speaking Europe.

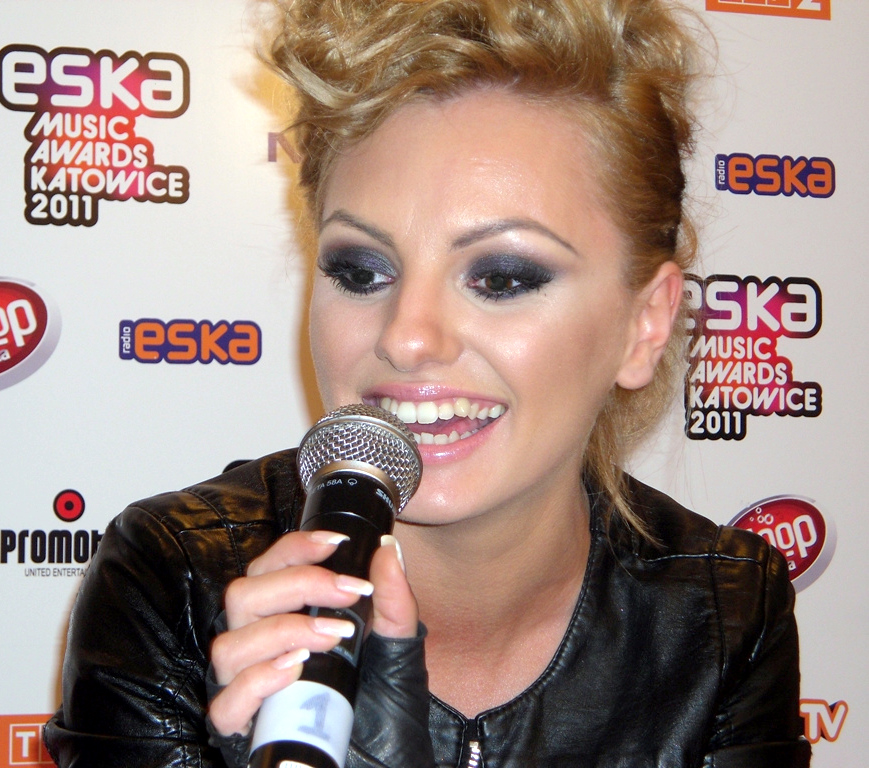
Stan during Eska Music Awards 2011 in Katowice

In April 2014, Stan released her comeback single "Thanks for Leaving", which she said was personal. Several observers connected its lyrical message to her violent incident with Prodan. The follow-up "Cherry Pop" became the most sought-after ringtone on the Recochoku service in Japan within two hours of its release, and "Dance" experienced similar success on its release. Unlocked, Stan's second studio album, was premiered in August 2014, and charted at number 21 in Japan. Stan had also signed a new record deal with Fonogram Records. Later in 2014, the singer performed Cher's "Strong Enough" (1999) translated into Catalan ("Sóc forta") for La Marato, an annual Spanish charity event, and also appeared at the Spanish Carnival of Las Palmas as a special guest.

=== 2015–2019: Alesta and Mami ===
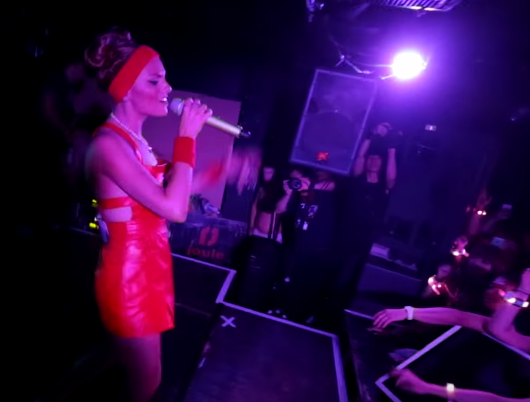
Stan performing in Osaka, during her Unlocked-Tour, 2014

In June 2015, Stan released "We Wanna", a collaboration with Romanian singer Inna and Puerto Rican reggaeton performer Daddy Yankee. The track reached the top 60 in multiple countries including Romania, Argentina and Italy, and was certified Gold in the latter region. The follow-up, "I Did It, Mama!", reached the top ten in her native country. Walt Disney approached Stan in the same year, and she was hired to be the voice of Inger in the Romanian version of Atlantis: Milo's Return. The singer's third studio album Alesta was issued in March 2016, and—supported by a tour in Japan—debuted at number 34 on the Oricon albums chart. Later that year, Stan made her fashion debut with a Japan-only range of clothing called Alesta X Bershka. She also joined the supergroup G Girls along with Antonia, Inna and Lori for the single "Call the Police", which was successful in Poland, and launched her own Alexandra Stan Records label.

In 2017, Stan recorded "Favorite Game" for the soundtrack of the Japanese movie Miko Girl. The film premiered during the 30th Tokyo International Film Festival in October 2017, where Stan appeared on the red carpet with its cast and crew. In April 2018, Stan released her fourth studio album, which is titled Mami, and peaked at number 119 in Japan. She also contributed guest vocals on Manuel Riva's track "Miami", which reached the top ten on the US Dance Club Songs chart; this was Stan's first appearance on an American Billboard ranking since 2011's "Mr. Saxobeat". It also reached the top ten in Romania. The singer opened the 2018 Neversea Festival, which had selected "Miami" as its anthem.

In June 2019, following several months spent in the United States, Stan released "I Think I Love It", her first single as a lead artist in over a year after "Mami" (2018). She had desired to expand her music career to the aforementioned territory and also considered venturing into acting, but returned to Romania due to personal issues and her father's health condition.

=== 2020–present: Rainbows and new music ===
Stan went on to sign record deals with Universal Music Romania and MediaPro Music, and the release "Obsesii" attained success in Romania, reaching number 12 on the local Airplay 100 chart in June 2020. From September to October 2020, the singer appeared as a contestant on reality singing competition Masked Singer România. She also appeared on the second season of reality game show Survivor România in a bid to "discover herself", but was soon evacuated for medical reasons. Her fifth studio album, Rainbows, was first revealed in a September 2020 interview, and eventually released on 29 April 2022.

In late October 2024, Stan released her first full Romanian album, Energia Ta, featuring songs like the title track, whose video was popular in Romania, and "Loop". It received minimal but good critic critiques, but sold less than expected, though, marking Stan's worst selling album.

On 14 March 2025, Stan released the single "Wanna Dance". A music video, directed by Mihai Țiu, was released the same day.

== Artistry and musical style ==
"Dance"
A 27-second sample of "Dance" (2014), an example of the use of a saxophone in her songs which had become her signature sound

When interviewed at the European Border Breakers Awards in 2012, Stan said the diverse nationalities in her home city Constanța have influenced her music. In another interview, she named Michael Jackson, Madonna, Adele, Rihanna, David Guetta, Sia and Robbie Williams as influences. Stan's first studio album Saxobeats features hi-NRG, dance, electronic, house and eurodance music, with saxophone being used on some songs. Stan expressed her interest in the instrument, which is often used in her region. Its use in her songs had become her signature "saxobeat" sound.

Unlocked has elements of dance, techno, pop and R&B, which one music critic described as an evolution in her artistry. The album also features "Thanks for Leaving", which is the first ballad of Stan's career. "Cherry Pop", which appears on the same album, uses a J-pop style. In a 2018 interview, Stan elaborated on the content of her first four studio albums: "Each album represents a stage in my life as a woman. On Saxobeats, I showed my rebellious side, typical of teenagers going to maturity, on Unlocked I rediscovered and reopened myself in front of the audience through the lyrics of songs, on Alesta I wanted to give my fans songs that they can have fun to, and [on Mami] I can say that I feel the most female so far."

== Public image and personal life ==
Stan, along with Inna, has been referred to as one of the most successful and best-paid Romanian artists. Stan frequently receives media attention for her provocative public appearances and photographic shoots. The music video for "I Did It, Mama!", which was released in 2015, included a scene in which she and a background dancer simulate sexual acts, which the Romanian Cancan and Click! publications speculated could have led to a ban of the video in Romania. In December 2019, controversial footage of Stan lasciviously dancing naked surfaced online, with the singer soon after apologizing and deleting the video, saying it had been mistakenly shared. Stan is open about her sexual practices, and revealed that she had experimented with group and lesbian sex; she further stated that she experiences occasional bisexual feelings.

Stan was born with only one kidney and received treatment for the nodules she had on her vocal cords early in her career. She has stated that she believes in God and has her own religious principles, describing herself as a non-traditional Christian. Throughout the years, Stan has lived in various cities including Constanța, Los Angeles, Santa Monica and Bucharest. At the age of 16, the singer was in a one-month romantic relationship with Romanian actor and recording artist Dorian Popa, but the relationship broke down because of alleged infidelity. She also had a short-lived relationship with the bar owner she worked at as a waitress in her youth in Valu lui Traian.

During Stan's court case against Marcel Prodan, he and others testified that she had more than a professional relationship with him; Stan initially denied these claims, but eventually acknowledged their relationship. In a 2022 interview, she revealed that depressive thoughts had led to her attempting suicide twice during that time period. From 2014 to 2019, Stan was in a relationship with Bogdan Stăruială, and also dated Bogdan Drăghici for a couple of months as of November 2020. In July 2021, she revealed to the public that she had married her fiancé Emanuel around two months earlier, on 24 April. Stan announced their separation in October 2021. Shortly after her divorce, Stan began dating singer and music producer Alex Parker. The two ended their relationship after five months of dating.

== Discography ==
Studio albums

- Saxobeats (2011)
- Unlocked (2014)
- Alesta (2016)
- Mami (2018)
- Rainbows (2022)
- Energia ta (2024)

== Awards and nominations ==
Year	Award	Category	Recipient	Result	Ref.
2011	2011 MTV Europe Music Awards	Best Romanian Act	Alexandra Stan	Won	
2011	2011 MTV Europe Music Awards	Best European Act	Alexandra Stan	Nominated	
2011	Romanian Music Awards	Best Song	"Mr. Saxobeat"	Won	
2011	Romanian Music Awards	Best Dance Song	"Mr. Saxobeat"	Nominated	
2011	Romanian Music Awards	Border Breaker	Alexandra Stan	Won	
2011	Romanian Music Awards	Best Female	Alexandra Stan	Nominated	
2011	European Border Breakers Award	Romanian Border Breaker	Alexandra Stan	Won	
2011	Los Premios 40 Principales 2011	Best International Song	"Mr. Saxobeat"	Nominated	
2012	Balkan Music Awards	Worldwide Breakthrough	Alexandra Stan	Won	
2012	Echo Music Prize	Hit of the Year	"Mr. Saxobeat"	Nominated	
2012	Romanian Music Awards	Best Female	Alexandra Stan	Nominated	
2012	Romanian Music Awards	Best Album	Saxobeats	Nominated	
2012	Radio România Actualități Awards	Pop/Dance Song of the Year	"Get Back (ASAP)"	Won	
2012	Radio România Actualități Awards	Pop/Dance Album of the Year	Saxobeats	Nominated	
2012	Radio România Actualități Awards	Pop/Dance Artist of the Year	Alexandra Stan	Nominated	
2012	Radio România Actualități Awards	Female Performer of the Year	Alexandra Stan	Nominated	
2012	Radio România Actualități Awards	Artist of the Year	Alexandra Stan	Nominated	
2013	Japan Gold Disc Award	Best New Artist	Alexandra Stan	Won	
2013	Romanian Music Awards	Best Female	Alexandra Stan	Nominated	
2013	Radio România Actualități Awards	Radio România Junior	"Lemonade"	Nominated	

== See also ==
- List of music released by Romanian artists that has charted in major music markets
