= Rainbows (album) =

Studio album by Alexandra Stan
- Released: 29 April 2022
- Length: 44:19
- Language: English; French; Romanian; Spanish
- Label: Universal Music Romania; Alexandra Stan; Victor
- Producer: Sergiu Ene

Alexandra Stan chronology
| Mami (2018) | Rainbows (2022) | Energia Ta (2024) |

Singles from Rainbows
- 1. "I Think I Love It" Released: 28 June 2019; 2. "Obsesii" Released: 31 January 2020; 3. "Take Me Home" Released: 5 May 2020; 4. "Tikari" Released: 7 August 2020; 5. "Aleasa" Released: 26 February 2021; 6. "Come Into My World" Released: 2 July 2021; 7. "Tokyo" Released: 22 October 2021; 8. "Bad at Hating You" Released: 11 March 2022; 9. "Cherry Lips" Released: 2 May 2022; 10. "Lie" Released: 27 May 2022; 11. "It's My Life" Released: 16 December 2022

Rainbows is the fifth studio album by Romanian singer Alexandra Stan, released on 29 April 2022 via Universal Music. The album marks her first in four years since the release of 2018's, Mami. The album title, cover, and release date were confirmed through Stan's Instagram on 15 April 2022. The album was highly anticipated by eight singles, including "I Think I Love It", "Obsesii", "Come Into My World" with Nervo and "Bad at Hating You".

== Background, promotion and release ==
The album's promotion began with the release of the single "I Think I Love It", which was released for digital download on 28 June 2019 by Universal Music Romania in various countries. Prior to release, Stan had spent several months in the United States, following which she signed new record deals with the aforementioned label and MediaPro Music. The song served as her first single in over a year after "Mami" (2018).

"Obsesii" was released as a single by Universal Music Romania for digital download in various countries on 31 January 2020. Lyrically, the Romanian language song talks about a love turned into obsession. Using several metaphors throughout, the lyrics also describe Stan's carnal desires as "fake illusions". The song was produced with the use of an "urban" sample. Upon release, "Obsesii" received positive reviews from music critics. During the pandemic of COVID-19, the singer released the third single "Take Me Home" on 5 May 2020. The song was released in all the digital platforms and was accompanied also by a music video on her official YouTube channel. In July 2020, Stan was featured in the single “Delfinii“ by the Romanian artist Criss Blaziny. It is their second song together after the 2016 Romanian hit “Au gust zilele“. In August 2020, Stan released the fourth single "Tikari" featuring the Puerto Rican rapper LiToo. The music video of the song was recorded in a small stadium in the singer's hometown, Costanța. Later was released another version adding the Mexican rapper W. Corona. The song obtained notoriety in the Italian and Brazilian's iTunes Stores. From September to October 2020, the singer appeared as a contestant on reality singing competition Masked Singer România. In October 2020, Stan released with the Romanian DJ, Paul Damixie, the single “Bandit". The music video of the song was released on the same day on Damixie's YouTube channel.

In early 2021, the singer's participation in the Romanian reality show Survivor România 2021 was made public, but Stan was soon evacuated for medical reasons. After her auto-elimination from the reality, Stan released a new single, "Aleasă" in February 26. The song is fully in Romanian and obtained a good success in the country, peaked the Top 30 of the Romanian Musical chart. In March 2021, Stan was featured in the newest single, "Tembleque", by the Italian and Romanian artist "Nosfe", in collaboration with the DJ Sak Noel. The song reached popular success in the Italian iTunes Charts. During the summer 2021, Stan released the single "Come Into My World" featuring the Australian duo Nervo. The song was accompanied by a music video released on the singer's official channel. In short time the song became one of the most streamed and listened song in the singer's digital platforms and it turned out a European radio moderate success. In the end of 2021, Stan released the single “Tokyo“ and was featured in the singles "Future Calling" by the DJs "Zookeepers" and "Faustix" and "Home Alone (Macaulay Culkin)" by Alex Parker. Alex Parker already collaborated with the singer for his single "Synchronize" in 2017.

In the early 2022, Stan announced the album's title and the release of new songs, for which she had already shot the music videos. A month before the album's release, the singer released the single "Bad at Hating You" and a new collaboration with Manuel Riva, called "Heal Your Soul". The two collaborated in 2018 for the hit "Miami". On 29 April 2022, the album was finally released, accompanied by the new single “Cherry Lips“. Universal also released an LP version of the album. The album was well acclaimed by the fans and the critics that praised the musical evolution of the singer. To promote the album in Japan, On May 29, was released a new edition with additional remixes and a new album cover, while for the European market were released as a singles the songs "Lie" and "It's My Life". The single "Lie" was released in Summer 2022, with additional remixes that included the DJs, Zookeepers and Manuel Riva. "It's My Life" was sent to the Romanian Radios in December 2022. The album was also promoted with various performances in musical festivals or concerts of the singer around the world during the 2022.

Stan stated many of the songs were written by her after romantic break-ups, "materialize all this suffering into something beautiful" The singer considered it her most personal album and she is happy that she could release what she wants and feels.

"I waited so long for the release of this album!!! And I'm glad it's finally here, you can listen to it too! I worked a lot on "Rainbows", poured my soul into the lyrics, wrote, composed, spent many hours in the studio, but it was all worth it. The album takes you through many states, as it happened to me. In fact, that's why it's called that. An amalgam of experiences, of beautiful feelings, loaded with emotion. You will listen to pop songs, but also ballads, you will dance, but you will also enter a state of melancholy. I hope you enjoy. In "Rainbows" it's about me, about you, about all of us and our experiences"

== Track listing ==
Rainbows track listing
| No. | Title | Writer(s) | Producer(s) | Length |
|---|---|---|---|---|
| 1. | "Rainbows" | Alexandra Stan; George Calin | George Calin | 1:51 |
| 2. | "Come Into My World" (with Nervo) | Nervo; Ummet Ozcan | Nervo; Ummet Ozcan | 3:12 |
| 3. | "It's My Life" | Corneliu Constantin Donici; Hirt Angelica; Laurentiu Duta; Radu Bolfea; Sergiu Calin Buta | Laurentiu Duta | 3:11 |
| 4. | "I Think I Love It" | Stan; Catalin Safta; Ioachim Petre; Krishane; Bolfea; Stanga Adelina; Vlad Lucan | Bolfea; Vlad Lucan | 3:00 |
| 5. | "Tikari" (featuring LiToo) | Stan; Carlos Enrique Perozo Yustin; Serban Cazan | Serban Cazan | 2:34 |
| 6. | "Kame Ha" (featuring Ana Tobor) | Frank-Erik Tchatchoua; Jayson DeZuzio; Madalin Rosioru | Madalin Rosioru | 2:56 |
| 7. | "Tokyo" | Stan; Calin; Mihaela Arsene; Robert Zgarbura | Calin | 3:02 |
| 8. | "Boy, Bye!" | Stan; Calin | Calin | 2:43 |
| 9. | "Bad at Hating You" | Christin Pohl; Calin; Teodora Spiric | Calin | 3:21 |
| 10. | "Cherry Lips" | Stan; Lorena Stoian; Paul Iorga; Tudor Ion | Paul Iorga | 3:06 |
| 11. | "Lie" | Adelina Stîngā; Stan; Maria Lātāretu; Petre Ioachim Octavian; Lucan | Ethos Music | 3:11 |
| 12. | "Outro" | Pohl; Calin; Spiric | Calin | 0:50 |
| 13. | "Obsesii" | Alex Pelin; Lucan | Lucan; Bolfea | 3:34 |
| 14. | "Aleasa" | Pelin; Viky Red | Viky Red | 2:54 |
| 15. | "Take Me Home" | Stan; Sterian | Alexandra Stan | 4:45 |
| Total length: | | | | 44:19 |

Notes

- ^{^[a]} signifies an additional producer

== Release history ==
Release history and formats for Rainbows
| Territory | Date | Format(s) | Label |
|---|---|---|---|
| Various | 29 April 2022 | CD; digital download; LP | Alexandra Stan |
| Japan | May 2022 | CD; digital download; LP | CD; digital download |
