= Noi doi =

Single by Alexandra Stan

from the album Mami
- Released: 8 August 2017
- Length: 3:24
- Label: Alexandra Stan
- Songwriters: Alexandra Stan; Chriss JustUs
- Producers: Cristian Tarcea; Alex Parker; Laurențiu Popescu; Alexandra Stan

Alexandra Stan singles chronology
"Boy Oh Boy" (2017)	"Noi doi" (2017)	"Miami" (2018)

"Noi doi" (Romanian: "Us Both"; stylized as "Noi 2") is a song recorded by Romanian singer Alexandra Stan for her fourth studio album, Mami (2018). It was digitally released on 8 August 2017 through Alexandra Stan Records. The track was written and produced by Stan herself, with additional writing from Chriss JustUs, and production by Cristian Tarcea, Alex Parker and Laurențiu Popescu. "Noi doi" is Stan's first single as a lead artist to be entirely written and performed in Romanian. Lyrically, it features the singer asking her love interest to spend time at the beach with her. "Noi doi" received praise from a music critic for its summery style and Stan's vocal delivery. An accompanying music video was uploaded onto Stan's official YouTube channel simultaneously with the single's release. Shot by Bogdan Păun, it features Stan and two other women on a yacht. Commercially, the song peaked at number 80 in Romania.

== Background and composition ==
"Noi doi"
A 20-second sample of "Noi doi", a Romanian-language song. Lyrically, Stan invites her love interest to come to the beach and spend time with her.

"Noi doi" was written and produced by Stan herself, with additional writing from Chriss JustUs, and production by Cristian Tarcea, Alex Parker and Laurențiu Popescu. It was mixed and mastered by Tarcea at the Thrace Music Studio in Constanța, Romania. "Noi doi" is Stan's first single as a lead artist to be written and performed completely in Romanian. She had previously sung Romanian lyrics when featured on Hi-Q's "Mor de dor" (2010), Trupa Zero's "Inimă de gheață" (2014), Dorian's "Motive" (2015) and Criss Blaziny's "Au gust zilele" (2016). The single was made available for digital download on 8 August 2017 by Alexandra Stan Records, and was the second one to be released under Stan's own label after "Boy Oh Boy".

The lyrics of "Noi doi", when translated to English, feature an invitation to a love interest: "Baby/ Would you do me a favor/ If you come to the sea/ We would be both under the sun/ Under the sun, both of us". Regarding this, Stan said in a press release: "I am the child of the sea, I feed myself with the sun, I love the energy of the water and I think that's what sea means: happiness, fun, where the stress disappears and also the ideal place to start relationships".

== Reception ==
Jonathan Currinn, writing for CelebMix, praised Stan's "relaxed and confident" vocal delivery in Romanian, and called the song a "summer relaxing anthem" and "Romanian pop music at its best". He labelled "Noi doi" a great follow-up to "Boy Oh Boy", while comparing it to Stan's previous singles "Vanilla Chocolat" (2014) and "Écoute" (2016). Commercially, "Noi doi" debuted at number 84 on Romania's Airplay 100 chart for the week ending 24 September 2017, moving to its peak position at number 80 the next week.

== Music video and promotion ==
Stan delivered an acoustic performance of "Noi doi" for Romanian radio station Kiss FM on 15 August 2017. An accompanying music video for the song was shot by Bogdan Păun from video production company NGM Creative and uploaded onto the singer's YouTube account on 8 August 2017. Alexandru Mureșan acted as the director of photography, while hair styling, make-up and styling were handled by Alex Ifimov and Anca Stăruială. The clip mainly portrays Stan and two other women riding the waves on a yacht. Fellow scenes also show the singer parading around with a blow-up banana at a beach, performing to the song in front of a blue car, and residing at what appears to be a circus with the two fellow women.

According to an editor from Antena 1, the visual sees "a gang of playful girls, having fun, with Stan as the captain of the group." Currinn praised the video for relating to the song well, while describing it as "very cheeky and totally brings out [...] Stan's flirtatious side." Writing for his own website, he speculated that a scene portraying the singer and the two fellow women pulling a towel from a man's waist could feature Stan's real-life boyfriend Bogdan Stăruială.

== Track listing ==
Digital download
No.	Title	Length
1.	"Noi doi"	3:24

== Credits and personnel ==
Credits adapted from the official music video.

Technical and songwriting credits

- Alexandra Stan – lead vocals, composer, producer
- Chriss JustUs – composer
- Alex Parker – producer
- Thrace Music Studio – recording studio
- Laurențiu Popescu – producer
- Cristian Tarcea – producer, mixing, mastering

Visual credits

- Alex Ifimov – hair styling, make-up, styling
- Alexandru Mureșan – director of photography
- Bogdan Păun – director
- Anca Stăruială – styling

== Charts ==
Chart (2017)	Peak position
Romania (Airplay 100)	80

== Release history ==
Territory	Date	Format(s)	Label
Various	8 August 2017	Digital download	Alexandra Stan
Italy	19 April 2019	Radio airplay	CDF
