= Cherry Pop =

Single by Alexandra Stan

from the album Unlocked
- Released: 28 May 2014
- Recorded: 2014
- Studio: Fonogram (Bucharest, Romania)
- Genre: J-pop
- Length: 3:11
- Label: Roton
- Songwriters: Lukas Hällgren; Alexandra Stan; Erik Lidbom
- Producers: Hällgren; Lidbom

Alexandra Stan singles chronology
| "Thanks for Leaving" (2014) | "Cherry Pop" (2014) | "Dance" (2014) |

Music video
- "Cherry Pop" on YouTube

"Cherry Pop" is a song recorded by Romanian singer Alexandra Stan for her second studio album Unlocked (2014). It was made available for digital download on 28 May 2014 through Roton as the record's second single. The track was written by the singer, Lukas Hällgren and Erik Lidbom, while production was handled by the latter two. "Cherry Pop" was recorded at the Fonogram Studios in Bucharest, Romania, with additional engineering being done at Lidbom's Hitfire Production.

Musically, "Cherry Pop" is of the J-pop genre, but is also influenced by Eurodance and house music, and has a dubstep breakdown. An accompanying music video for the track was uploaded on 28 May 2014 on Stan's YouTube channel; Khaled Mokhtar was both the clip's director and director of photography. It was shot in Buftea, Romania, and portrays Stan and her background dancers performing choreography created by performer Emil Rengle. The song reached number 64 on the Japan Hot 100 and became the most-sought ringtone on the largest Japanese profile site, Recochoku.

== Background and composition ==
"Cherry Pop"
A 22-second sample of "Cherry Pop", showcasing the song's refrain which is then followed by a dubstep breakdown.

"Cherry Pop" was written by Stan herself, Lukas Hällgren and Erik Lidbom, while production was handled by both Hällgren and Lidbom. It was recorded at the Fonogram Studios in Bucharest, Romania and was additionally mixed and engineered at Lidbom's Hitfire Production in Uppsala, Sweden. Further's work on the track was done during FonoCamp2013, the first Romanian international songwriting camp held in Azuga. Fellow Romanian and international singers were also present at the two-weeks event, such as Delia Matache, Mohombi, Smiley and Deepcentral.

Stan described "Cherry Pop" as a J-pop song, noting that while she had not worked with the genre "[it] fits my style", as she finds J-pop music "very energetic, it's got such a positive vibe to it." She also noticed influences to Eurodance. An administrator of IasiFun commended the recording as being influenced by house, while also describing the song's instrumentation as "electric" and "vibrant". Anthony Easton, a writer for The Singles Jukebox, described the song as a "popluxe", while Ian Mew compared it to "Bubble Pop!" by South Korean singer Hyuna. According to Popdust, "Cherry Pop" uses dubstep for its breakdown. The main idea for the song was based on Stan's first kiss which, according to her, "tasted like candy".

== Critical reception ==
I am also very surprised [about the fact that "Cherry Pop" debuted atop the Japanese iTunes Singles Chart]. I didn't think that the song would enter so speedy to the iTunes Charts in Japan. My Japanese fans were waiting for me and I think they missed me. I missed them, too, of course. That's the life. When you choose to see the things as positive and to go on, there's nothing bad that can happen to you[.]

— Stan on "Cherry Pop"

"Cherry Pop" received generally mixed reviews from music critics upon release. The Singles Jukebox gave the song an overall rating of 5/10, with one of the writers, Andy Hutchins, confessed that "a better title for the song might have been 'Dr Pepper'". Website Popdust described the song as "outdated", but at the same time catchy and funny. Hitfire praised the song's refrain as being "earwhormy" and "trashy". They went on saying that "Cherry Pop" "doesn't reach the standards like of her previously launched songs, 'Mr. Saxobeat', 'Get Back (ASAP)' and 'Lemonade'". Music website Pop Shock described the single as a "grower track". Website Addictivoz praised overall her album Unlocked, mentioning also that the song is "ironic". Another article called the song ″rather obvious″ but ″perfect for the summer″. In a 2019 retrospective for Unlocked, writer Jan Bran from R&BJUNK praised Stan's ability to navigate a variety of subgenres, citing ″Cherry Pop″ as an example.

== Commercial performance ==
According to the biggest Japanese profile site, Recochoku, "Cherry Pop" became the most sought ringtone on their website within two hours. The news that "Cherry Pop" achieved so much success in Japan came to Stan when she was on tour in Turkey. There, the organizers of her show displayed the sentence "Congratulations, Alexandra Stan, you're number 1!" on the main screen of the club. The song entered the Japan Hot 100 at number 64 on 5 July 2014. It subsequently left the chart after just one week. "Cherry Pop" also peaked at number 82 on the native Airplay 100 chart, and reached number two on the Turkish Number One Top 20 compiled on 6 September 2014.

== Music video ==
An accompanying music video for "Cherry Pop" was uploaded onto Stan's YouTube channel on 28 May 2014, where it has since amassed a total of 5 million views. The clip was shot by Khaled Mokhtar in Buftea, Romania in a set built specially for this project. The accompanying choreography was choreographed by Romanian performer Emil Rengle and the eight "shiny and glam" different outfits used for the video were designed by Andra Moga. Particularly, Stan described the video as incorporating "both a futuristic and a retro point of view".

The video opens with Stan and some of her male back-up dancers being presented in a dark white room. Subsequently, the room becomes enlightened and Stan is seen wearing transparent sunglasses, a white sweatband and a silver jacket. Following this, she retrieves a tennis racket from one of her background dancers and holds it in front of her face before returning the racket to a nearby dancer. Next, Stan performs the pre-refrain of the song, while two female performers clutch a hair dryer in their hands. For the refrain, she and ten other female background dancers are performing synchronized dances, with them having wigs on, and dressing white clothing and red accessories. Following this, Stan is presented standing on a yellow plate which is kept in the air by two threads. She wears a silver leotard and a multicolored wig. Next, Stan is shown walking into a tennis field, whereon she plays a tennis match against herself. For the breakdown of "Cherry Pop", the video gets introduced into a dark-lighted room. There, her previously shown male background dancers are presented; the video continues with Stan dancing accompanied by her dancers. The clip finally ends with a pink tennis ball dropping out of the ceiling, while the screen becomes black.

== Live performances ==
On 12 December 2014, Stan performed both "Cherry Pop" and "Vanilla Chocolat" on an episode of Vocea României. Shortly after her performance, juror Tudor Chirilă expressed how he was very disappointed by Stan's act, as she did not provide live vocals. In an interview with Cancan, Stan confessed that "[her] conditions of appearance at Vocea României were previously discussed with the producers of the show, so no one should have been surprised about [her] performing playback". "Cherry Pop" was included on the track list of her Unlocked Tour (2014) and her Cherry Pop Summer Tour (2014).

== Track listings ==
- Digital download
1. "Cherry Pop" – 3:11
- Spanish digital remix EP
1. "Cherry Pop" (DJ Kone & Marc Palacios radio edit) – 3:33
2. "Cherry Pop" (Geo Da Silva & Jack Mazzoni radio remix) – 3:15
3. "Cherry Pop" (CryDuom remix radio) – 3:13
4. "Cherry Pop" (DJ Kone & Marc Palacios remix) – 6:24
5. "Cherry Pop" (Geo Da Silva & Jack Mazzoni remix) – 4:17
6. "Cherry Pop" (CryDuom remix extended) – 4:06

== Credits and personnel ==
Credits adapted from the liner notes of Unlocked and The Collection.

Visual credits

- Ema Băniță – styling assistant
- Mihai Codleanu – editing
- Georgeta Nicoleta Cîmpeanu – make-up artist, hair styling assistant
- Irina Iancius – make-up artist, hair styling assistant
- Oana Imbrea – production coordinator
- Alex Iftimov – hair styling, make-up artist, script
- Andra Moga – styling, script
- Khaled Mokhtar – director, director of photography, script
- Laurent Morel – colorist
- Emil Rengle – choreography

Recording and vocal credits

- Recorded at Fonogram Studios in Bucharest, Romania.
- Mixed and engineered at Hitfire Production in Uppsala, Sweden.
- Alexandra Stan – lead vocals

Technical and songwriting credits

- Lukas Hällgren – songwriting, additional producing
- Erik Lidbom – songwriting, producing
- Alexandra Stan – songwriting

== Charts ==
| Chart (2014) | Peak position |
|---|---|
| Japan (Japan Hot 100) (Billboard) | 64 |
| Romania (Airplay 100) | 82 |
| Turkey (Number One Top 20) | 2 |

== Release history ==
| Country | Date | Format | Label |
|---|---|---|---|
| Romania | 28 May 2014 | Digital single | Roton |
| Japan | 18 June 2014 | Digital single | Victor |
| Spain | 22 July 2014 | Digital single | Blanco y Negro |
| Italy | 30 July 2014 | Digital single; radio airplay | Ego |
| Spain | 2 December 2014 | Digital remix EP | Blanco y Negro |

== See also ==
- List of music released by Romanian artists that has charted in major music markets
