= Give Me Your Everything =

Single by Alexandra Stan

from the album Unlocked
- Released: 20 August 2014
- Recorded: 2014; Fonogram Studios; HaHaHa Studios (Bucharest, Romania)
- Genre: Dance-pop
- Length: 3:25
- Label: Victor
- Songwriters: Șerban Cazan; Alexandra Stan; LeeAnna James; Naz Tokio; Andrei Mihai
- Producer: Șerban Cazan

Alexandra Stan singles chronology
"Dance" (2014)	"Give Me Your Everything" (2014)	"Vanilla Chocolat" (2014)

Music video
- "Give Me Your Everything" on YouTube

"Give Me Your Everything" is a song recorded by Romanian singer Alexandra Stan for her second studio album, Unlocked (2014). It was made available for digital download on 20 August 2014 through Victor Entertainment. "Give Me Your Everything" was written by Stan, Serban Cazan, LeAnna James, Naz Tokio and Andrei Mihai, while production was solely handled by Cazan. A music video for the song was directed by Vlad Fenesan and uploaded onto the singer's YouTube channel, where it has amassed over three million views. The clip shows Stan chasing a masked man in a dark landscape. Upon its release, the video aroused controversy for a scene in which Stan is wearing a white robe with masonic symbols inscribed on its back. Particularly, Urban.ro named the clip "her most bizarre video ever".

The recording was met with positive reviews. Some music critics praised the song's "Caribbean groove" and the singer's "hypnotic" and "crystalline" vocals, while others comparing "Give Me Your Everything" to the material featured on Rihanna's A Girl like Me (2006). The style of the song has been described as "urban" and "tribal". During an interview in Spain, Stan explained that "Give Me Your Everything" was written as a present for her Asian and Arabic fans, due to the song's more oriental style and spiritual meaning.

== Background ==
In May 2014, it was announced that Stan would tour in Japan during her Unlocked Tour (2014) for the first time in two years. During the tour, a new track called "Give Me Your Everything" was unveiled at the end of Stan's concert at Shibuya Womb in Tokyo on 18 July 2014, with her also confessing that it was scheduled to be released on 27 August 2014 as the fourth single from Unlocked. When asked about the track by her Japanese label Victor Entertainment, Stan felt that she had made a song with an oriental mood, weaving together an African and Asian feel with a Balkan sound". Particularly, during website Barks's review of her performance in Tokyo, they called the silver leotard she wore "bold", while also describing "Give Me Your Everything" as a song having a "violently dark melody".

== Recording and composition ==
"Give Me Your Everything"
A 20-second sample of the track. Stan described it as a "more oriental" recording during an interview.

The song was written by Stan herself, Șerban Cazan, LeAnna James, and Naz Tokio; the production was made by Cazan. It was composed during FonoCamp 2013, the first international songwriting camp in Romania which was organized by both Fonogram and HaHaHa Studios and held in Azuga. Fellow Romanian and international singers were also present at the two-weeks event, such as Delia Matache, Mohombi, Smiley and Deepcentral. The track was mixed for HaHaHa Production and recorded at Fonogram Studios and HaHaHa Studios. In an interview in Barcelona, Spain, Stan described the song as "more oriental, with a lot of spiritual meaning". She continued to explain that "Give Me Your Everything" was written as a present for her Arabic and Asian fans due to the song's vibe. According to Pop Shock, the track is a Caucasian-flavoured mid-tempo ballad. Lyrically, Stan tells her unidentified boyfriend not to be so hard on her, and if he really loves her, he needs to give her his everything. The chorus of "Give Me Your Everything" consists solely of the phrase "Don't you be so hard on me / If you love me, come and give me your everything".

== Reception ==
Pop Shock praised the song, saying that they didn't expect Stan to choose such a genre for a track. Pop Shock went on saying that the track "reinvents the cutesy, innuendo-loving Europop star into an exotic vixen of global proportions". Addictivoz compared "Give Me Your Everything" to Shakira. Pure Charts labelled the song as "tribal" and "urban", pointing out the sexual lyrics "I'm doing limbo / Your body is my temple." Digital Journal praised the song, confessing that Stan "displays a different style to her artistry." The song's Middle Eastern melodic flair "enhances [the song] sonically". They went on saying that Stan's vocals are "hypnotic" and "crystalline." Digital Journal noted that Stan "is not afraid to take risks and try new things." Direct Lyrics compared "Give Me Your Everything" to the material featured on Rihanna's A Girl like Me (2006).

== Music video ==
=== Release and synopsis ===
An accompanying music video for "Give Me Your Everything" premiered on 27 August 2014 on Stan's YouTube channel, where it has amassed over three million views as of August 2018. It was directed by Vlad Fenesan with production studio Griffon & Swans. The clip is featured on Stan's Japanese DVD release The Collection. The video opens with a lost Stan that seeks refuge in a dark forest full of fog and smoke, sporting a black cloak and holding a violet flame in her hand that guides her. Afterwards, she encounters a mysterious black-clothed person whose face cannot be seen. After performing a choreography with her fellow backup dancers, she steps into a white realm full of light. Subsequently, the mysterious person appears again and Stan chases him whereby she enters a pitch-black room. Following this, she performs a dance act in front of more mirrors. Afterwards, Stan is shown wearing a white robe and walking through a jungle-like setting. After encountering the mysterious person again, the video ends with her removing his mask to see his true identity. Scenes interspersed through the main video show Stan dancing with her black-clothed background dancers.

=== Analysis and controversy ===
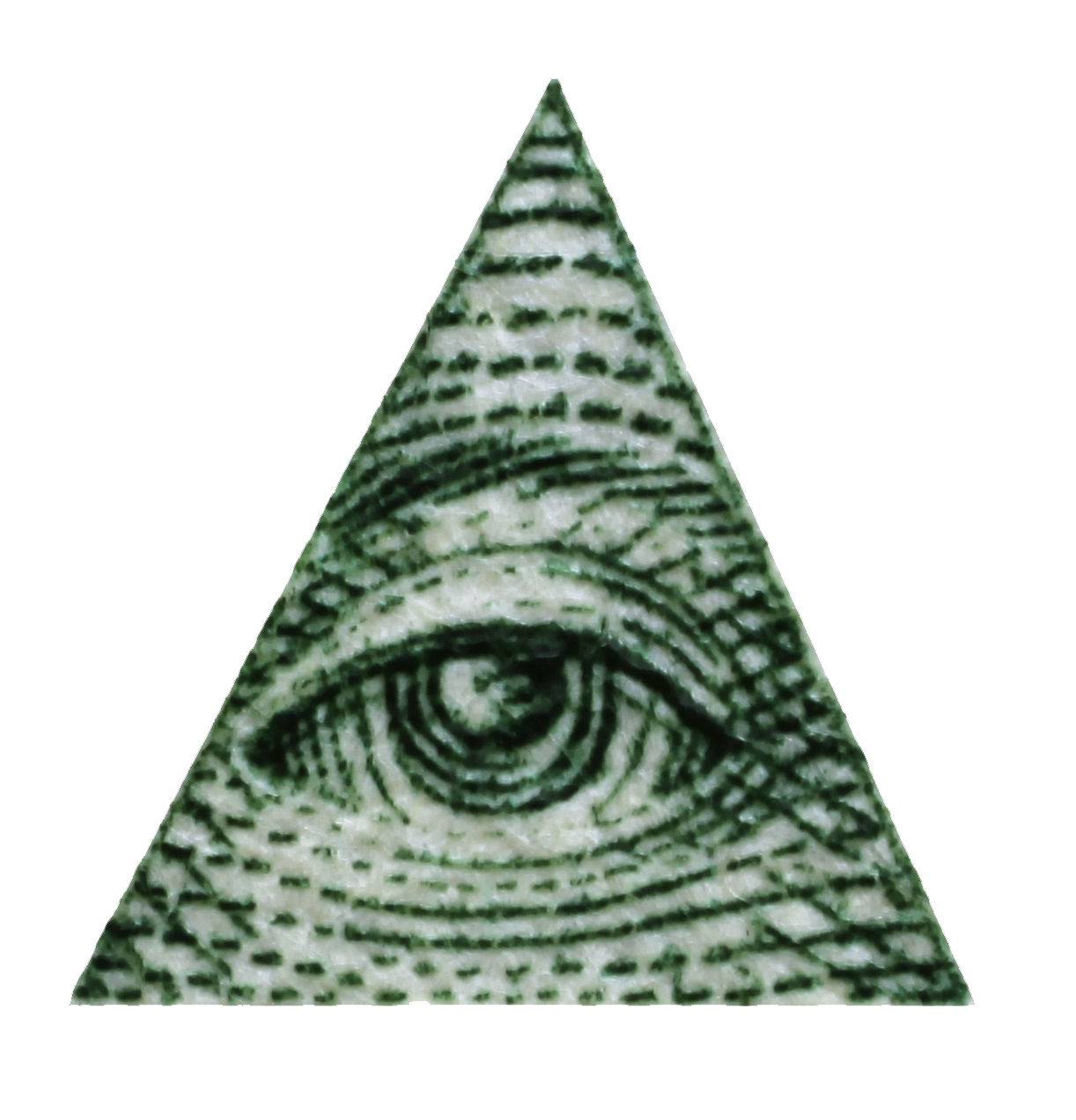
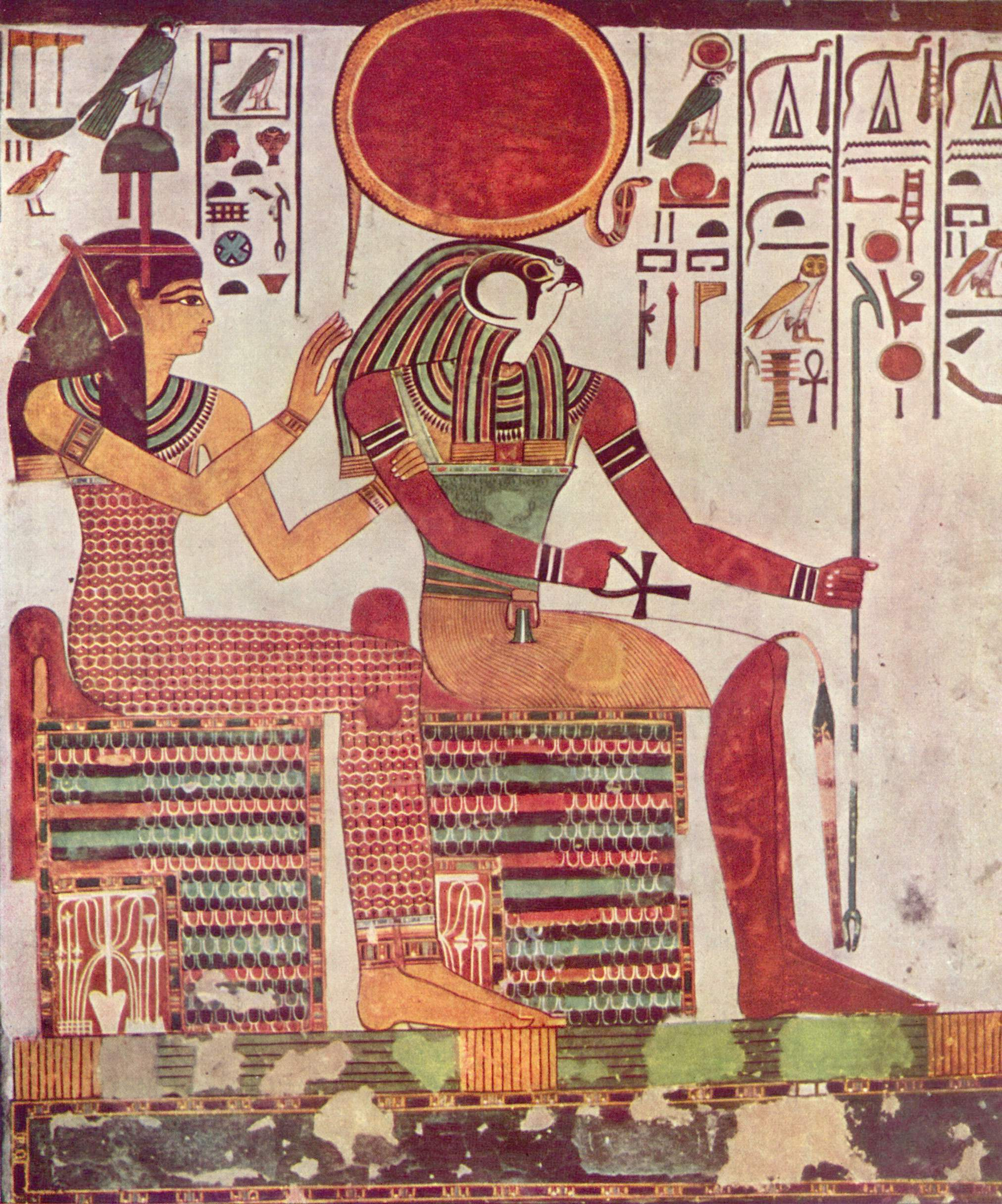
The usage of the pyramid (left) and Egyptian sun god Ra (right) throughout the video was pointed out by critics.

Urban.ro praised the music video for being "exceptional", while also naming it "her most bizarre video ever". They also pointed out the use of masonic symbols by displaying a screenshot of the video where Stan is wearing a white cloak and pointing out inscriptions on the back of the screen. The symbols inscribed are the pyramid and Ra. "These are the most obvious moments of video; the rest is suggested." Urban.ro compared the man, which Stan is chasing, to a demon, due to his black clothing. They went on to compare one scene of the video to Beyoncé's clip for her song, "Grown Woman" (2013). Pro TV felt that the clip for "Give Me Your Everything" is very different from her previous works. They felt that the video showed a more daring side of Stan, compared to her previous videos featuring "summerly-dressed dancers", due to the incorporation of religious and cultural references. Direct Lyrics has cited that: "Just like the song, the 'Give Me Your Everything' visual also has dark vibe." They went on into saying that the clip "will definitely keep your on your seat till the end."

== Credits and personnel ==
Credits are adapted from the liner notes of Unlocked.

Recording

- Produced for HaHaHa Production in Bucharest, Romania.
- Recorded at Fonogram Studios in Bucharest, Romania.
- Recorded at HaHaHa Studios in Bucharest, Romania.

Personnel

- Dimitri Caceaune – photography
- Șerban Cazan – songwriting, producing
- LeeAnna James – songwriting
- Andrei Mihai – songwriting
- Alexandra Stan – lead vocals, songwriting
- Naz Tokio – songwriting

== Track listing ==
- Digital download
1. "Give Me Your Everything" – 3:25

== Release history ==
Territory	Date	Format	Label
Japan	20 August 2014	Digital single	Victor Entertainment
Belgium	27 August 2014	Digital single	Roton / Fonogram Records
Brazil	27 August 2014	Digital single	Roton / Fonogram Records
Denmark	27 August 2014	Digital single	Roton / Fonogram Records
Norway	27 August 2014	Digital single	Roton / Fonogram Records
Romania	27 August 2014	Digital single	Roton / Fonogram Records
Sweden	27 August 2014	Digital single	Roton / Fonogram Records
United Kingdom	27 August 2014	Digital single	Roton / Fonogram Records
United States	27 August 2014	Digital single	Roton / Fonogram Records
Spain	28 October 2014	Digital single	Blanco y Negro
