= Manuel Riva =

Romanian DJ and musical artist

- Born: George Emanuel Călin; Romania
- Genres: Romanian pop, dance
- Occupation: DJ
- Website: manuelriva.com

George Emanuel Călin better known as Manuel Riva is a Romanian DJ and record producer. A long running artist and DJ, he started with the trop Demmo and later in the duo Deepcentral.

== In Demmo (Romania) (2001-2006) ==
Demmo (Romania)
- Origin: Romania
- Genres: Romanian pop
- Years active: 2001-2006
- Past members: George Călin; Anamaria Ferentz; Vik

Manuel Riva began his musical career as George Călin with the band Demmo, that also included Anamaria Ferentz and Vik. Together they released four albums: Pentru inima ta, Trei, Ding Dang Dong and Cântecul meu. The band had a considerable hit with the Romanian version of "Darla Dirladada". The band lasted from 2001 to 2006.

== In Deepcentral (2008-2013) ==
Deepcentral
- Origin: Bucharest, Romania
- Genres: Electro, House, Pop
- Years active: 2008-2013
- Label: Universal Music Romania
- Past members: George Călin(DJ); Doru Todoruț (vocalist)

In 2008 George Călin established the band Deepcentral with him as DJ and Doru Todoruț as vocalist. with two albums through Universal Music Romania, Deepcentral (in 2009) and O stea (2013). Charting hits with Deecentral included notably "Russian Girl", "In Love", "Music Makes Me Free" and "Speed of Sound" in the period 2009 to 2011. His song "Gura ta" by Delia and Deepcentral, topped as number one Romanian hit for 2016.

== As Manuel Riva ==
In 2016, Manuel Riva built on his DJ career and in the course of 2 years released many tracks and remixes. One of his collaborations, "Close the Deal" (with Optick and Eneli), a deep house with progressive influences, drew the attention of Dutch DJ Tiësto who played it on his Club Life radio show. In February 2016, Manuel Riva released alongside Eneli the song "Mhm Mhm" with heavy rotation on all major Romanian radio stations peaking at number 3 on the Billboard Dance / Club Chart in the United States in addition to charting in many European Shazam charts. He was nominated for the Best Romanian Act at the MTV Europe Music Awards 2016. In November 2016, he released "Hey Now" another hit for Riva. He solidified his success in 2017 with "Resolution", "Saturday Night, Man", in collaboration with Hyptonix, "Treehouse" (featuring Waleed) and "Kiyomi". His songs were mixed or included in the podcasts of renowned DJs such as Sam Feldt, Oliver Heldens, Ummet Ozcan and Cosmic Gate. At the Media Music Awards 2017, Manuel Riva was named "Best Romanian DJ". Also in 2017, he opened the Untold music festival on the main stage.

In 2018 he collaborated with Alexandra Stan, with whom he released the single "Miami" featuring her voice. "Miami" became a big international hit, although the original comes from 2016. The song was used as the anthem for the 2018 Neversea Festival. It also charted on the Romanian Airplay 100 chart as well as Billboard Dance Club Songs peaking at number 10 and on Dance/Electronic Songs charts peaking at number 44.

== Discography as George Călin ==
=== Albums ===
With Demmo (Romania)

- Pentru inima ta
- Trei
- Ding Dang Dong
- Cântecul meu

With Deepcentral

- Deepcentral (2009)
- O stea (2013)

== Discography as Manuel Riva ==
=== Singles ===
- 2016: "Mhm Mhm" (feat Eneli)
- 2016: "Hey Now"
- 2017: "Sacred Touch" (feat. Misha Miller)
- 2018: "Miami" (feat Alexandra Stan)
- 2019: "What Mama Said" (ft. Misha Miller)
- 2020: Confusion (feat Florena)

==== Charting ====
Title	Year	Peak positions			Album
Title	Year	ROM	US Dance Club	US Dance/ Elec.	Album
"Mhm Mhm" (featuring Eneli)	2016	—N/a	25	—	Non-album singles
"Miami" (featuring Alexandra Stan)	2018	8	10	44	Non-album singles
"—" denotes a release that did not chart or was not released in that territory.

==== Non-charting ====
- 2015: "How You Say" (feat. Hyptonix)
- 2015: "Wrong or Right" (feat. Eneli)
- 2016: "We Are One" (feat. Eneli)
- 2016: "Close the Deal" (feat. Optick & Eneli)
- 2016: "We Own the Night" (feat. Onuc & Luise)
- 2017: "Resolution"
- 2017: "Saturday Night, Man" (feat. Hyptonix)
- 2017: "Treehouse" (feat. Waleed)
- 2017: "Kiyomi
- 2017: "Jupiter Sun"
- 2017: "Ravin'" (feat. Robert Konstantin)
- 2017: "The Wall" (feat. Robert Konstantin)

=== Remixes ===
List of remixes, showing year released and original artists
Year	Title	Original artists	Ref.
2014	"Troublemaker" (Manuel Riva Remix)	Deepcentral	
2014	"Divided Sky" (Manuel Riva Remix)	Bianca Linta	
2015	"Hipsterium" (Manuel Riva Remix)	DJ Marika and Tripwerk featuring Junkyard	
2016	"Naughty Truck" (Manuel Riva Remix)	Bianca Linta	
2016	"Faith in You" (Manuel Riva Remix)	U-Gin featuring Luise	
2016	"Time" (Manuel Riva Remix)	Paul Damixie featuring FELI	
2016	"Save It" (Manuel Riva Remix)	Salt Ashes	
2017	"Tuesday" (Manuel Riva Remix)	Burak Yeter featuring Danelle Sandoval	
2017	"Heaven" (Manuel Riva Remix)	Inna	
2017	"Say My Name" (Manuel Riva Remix)	Moonsound	
2018	"Sticks & Stones" (Manuel Riva & Cristian Poow Remix)	Metro and Nelly Furtado	
2018	"Move On" (DJ Marika & Manuel Riva Remix)	Mike Maiden	
2018	"The Longest Road" (Manuel Riva Remix)	Morgan Page featuring Lissie	
2019	"Coffee Shop" (Manuel Riva Remix)	Sunnery James & Ryan Marciano featuring Kes Kross	

== See also ==
- List of music released by Romanian artists that has charted in major music markets
