= Unlocked (Alexandra Stan album) =

- Cover artwork used in all markets except Japan

Studio album by Alexandra Stan
- Released: 27 August 2014
- Studios: Fonogram Studios in Bucharest, Romania; Perfect Sound Studios in Hollywood, California
- Genres: Dance; techno; pop; R&B
- Length: 57:22
- Languages: English; French; Spanish
- Labels: Victor; Fonogram
- Producers: Prince Chrishan; Alexandru Cotoi; Mika Moupondo; Ionuț Adrian Radu; Lukas Hällgren; Anton Kuhl; Șerban Cazan; Gabriel Huiban; Victor Bourosu; Andreas Schuller; Sebastian Jacome

Alexandra Stan chronology
Cliché (Hush Hush) (2013)	Unlocked (2014)	Alesta (2016)

Alternative cover
- Cover artwork used in Japan. The Japanese deluxe edition is a colored version of this photograph.

Singles from Unlocked
- 1. "Thanks for Leaving" Released: 28 April 2014; 2. "Cherry Pop" Released: 28 May 2014; 3. "Dance" Released: 18 July 2014; 4. "Give Me Your Everything" Released: 20 August 2014; 5. "Vanilla Chocolat" Released: 24 December 2014

Unlocked is the second studio album by Romanian singer-songwriter Alexandra Stan, released on 27 August 2014, by Victor Entertainment. Several collaborators are credited for the record's production, including Andreas Schuller, Sebastian Jacome, Chrishan Prince, Erik Lidbom, and Gabriel Huiban; songs were developed during the first Romanian international songwriting camp FonoCamp in 2013. Unlocked was released following an alleged physical altercation between Stan and her former manager Marcel Prodan, which led to a court case and a short hiatus in 2013. As a result, she left Prodan's label and signed a record deal with Fonogram Records to distribute the record in various countries.

Unlocked features dance, techno, pop, and R&B genres, with influences varying from J-pop to house music. Lyrically, it deals with themes of liberation and new beginnings. Music critics gave the album mixed reviews, criticizing the songs' lack of originality. Unlocked debuted and peaked at number 21 on the Oricon Albums Chart in Japan, where it had sold 17,045 units by January 2015. Five singles were released to promote the album, of which two—"Cherry Pop" and "Dance"—charted on the Billboard Japan Hot 100. To further promote Unlocked, the singer embarked on the Cherry Pop Summer Tour and the Unlocked Tour in 2014 performing in Japan, Mexico, Russia, and Turkey.

== Background and development ==
From a professional point of view, Unlocked is a musical and artistic testimony to all that happened to me during the last year. I transposed all the feelings I had in the lyrics and music featured on the album. It is called Unlocked because it means that I now feel without limits, creative, free and open. I worked very hard on the record and sometimes it seemed hard to sing all the sad verses in some songs. Now, when I see the finished product, I'm very happy.

— Stan talking about Unlocked on Adevărul.

In 2012 and 2013, Stan released the singles "Lemonade", "Cliché (Hush Hush)" and "All My People" for her second album. But the record's release was postponed following an alleged physical altercation with her manager Marcel Prodan, which led to Stan accusing him of multiple offenses in a court case. A Japan-only reissue of Saxobeats (2011) was released in October 2013 with the addition of the singles—the singer's last album on Prodan's label, Maan Records.

In late 2013 Stan began working with another team—including record producers and songwriters Alex Cotoi and Erik Lidbom—on her second studio album, Unlocked. She left Prodan's label and signed a record deal with Fonogram Records. Work on the album continued during the FonoCamp 2013, the first Romanian international songwriting camp held in Azuga, where she was accompanied by Romanian singers and producers. Stan was involved in the writing process for all the songs featured on Unlocked, except for "Thanks for Leaving", "Set Me Free" and "Trumpet Blows".

== Release and artwork ==
Unlocked was released to Japanese digital outlets on 27 August 2014, preceded by a preview of the album lasting eight minutes and 34 seconds uploaded onto YouTube. Digital and physical releases followed later that year in other countries, while a bonus DVD and deluxe edition were made available in Japan. The Spanish version of Unlocked incorporates both original tracks and remixes on two separate track lists. For digital versions distributed in Germany "We Wanna" (2015), a track featuring Inna and Daddy Yankee, was added to the main track list. Dimitri Caceaune photographed the cover art for Unlocked. It shows Stan wearing a multicolored jacket in front of a pink-purple background. In the alternative black-and-white artwork for the Japanese edition of the album, her eyes were made up to look larger as the singer felt that the Japanese were "very obsessed by big eyes."

== Promotion and commercial performance ==
Unlocked was supported by the Cherry Pop Summer Tour and the Unlocked Tour. The first tour started in Russia on 5 July and continued to Mexico, Turkey, and Japan, ending on 29 July 2014. Romanian dance group StanBoyz accompanied Stan for her Unlocked Tour, which visited the same countries.

"Thanks for Leaving" was released on 28 April 2014, along with its accompanying music video as the lead single from Unlocked, peaking at number 42 on Romania's Airplay 100 chart, number 83 on Italy's FIMI ranking. "Cherry Pop", the record's second single, followed on 28 May 2014. Khaled Mokhtar shot the official music video in Buftea, Romania, showing the singer playing tennis against herself in a futuristic setting. The track charted at number 64 on the Billboard Japan Hot 100. The album's best-performing single on that chart, "Dance", was released on 18 July 2014. Promoted by a music video also shot by Mokhtar, the recording peaked at number 25 in Japan, and at number 70 on Austria's Ö3 Austria Top 40 chart.

The album's fourth single, "Give Me Your Everything", followed on 20 August 2014. Its accompanying clip, shot by Mokhtar, caused controversy for a scene in which the singer is seen wearing a white robe with masonic symbols inscribed on its back; website Urban.ro called the visual "her most bizarre video ever." "Vanilla Chocolat" was released on 24 December 2014, as the fifth single from Unlocked, including vocals from Connect-R. It was accompanied by a selfie video showing them singing and performing at various live shows and at their label Roton. "We Wanna" — a bonus single available only on German digital editions of Unlocked, and later included on Stan's third studio album Alesta (2016) — peaked within the top 60 in Poland, Italy, Romania, and Slovakia, and was certified Gold by the FIMI. Unlocked itself debuted at number 21 on the Japanese Oricon Albums Chart with sales of 3,859 copies, eventually selling 17,045 units by January 2015.

== Composition and reception ==
"Dance"
A 20-second sample of "Dance", bringing a house influence to the album. One reviewer noticed that the saxophone sound from "Mr. Saxobeat" (2011) returned on "Dance".

All the lyrics on Unlocked are in English, except for some French verses in "Vanilla Chocolat" and a couple of lines of Spanish in "We Wanna". None are in Stan's native Romanian, though Hitfire suggested that her accent is strong enough that "Thanks for Leaving", a ballad written in the aftermath of Stan's violent breakup with Prodan, would have sounded better in Romanian. The songs are a mixture of dance, techno, pop, and R&B, with influences varying from J-pop ("Cherry Pop") to house ("Dance"). A saxophone sound similar to that on "Mr. Saxobeat" (2011) is used on "Dance". The songs on the album touch on themes such as freedom and new beginnings.

Several reviews found the music danceable but criticized the songs for lacking originality. Hitfire described "Vanilla Chocolat" as catchy, but found the lyrics meaningless and the track unremarkable. Pure Charts described "We Wanna" as "nothing new," and another Hitfire editor felt that "Dance", while better than the earlier singles from Unlocked, was unoriginal. "Thanks for Leaving" drew some positive comments and was described as a "grown up breakup ballad" and "a nice pop ballad, not too dramatic", with further praise for Stan's vocals and the song's message. RnB Junk's review was more favorable, describing the album as a major evolution in Stan's style beyond straightforward dance songs, and recommending "Thanks for Leaving", "Unlocked", "Set Me Free" and "Give Me Your Everything" as the highlights of the record. In a retrospective review from 2019, the publication called the album "underrated"; writer Jan Bran noted that while Unlocked had its highs and lows, it is worthy to be listened to in full, advising readers not to snub it.

== Track listing ==
Credits adapted from the liner notes of Unlocked.

Unlocked – International version
No.	Title	Writer(s)	Producer(s)	Length
1.	"Little Lies"	Prince Chrishan; Kyle Coleman; Alexandru Cotoi; Alexandra Stan; Mika Moupondo; Ionut Adrian Radu; Jade Burges (vocal sample)	Crishan; Cotoi	3:41
2.	"Cherry Pop"	Stan; Lukas Hällgren	Lidbom; Hällgren (add.)	3:11
3.	"Dance"	Cotoi; Stan; Mika Moupondo; Lee Anna McCollum; Cosmin Basasteanu; Lidbom	Cotoi; Lidbom	3:41
4.	"Back to Light"	Nazarine Henderson; McCollum; Stan; Anton Kuhl; Cotoi	Kuhl; Cotoi	3:34
5.	"Give Me Your Everything"	Serban Cazan; Stan; McCollum; Henderson; Andrei Mihai	Cazan	3:25
6.	"Kiss Me Goodbye"	Cotoi; Mika Moupondo; Stan	Cotoi	3:18
7.	"Vanilla Chocolat" (featuring Connect-R)	Cotoi; Stan; Stefan Mihalache; Mika Moupondo; Sava Constantin	Cotoi	3:17
8.	"Trumpet Blows"	Gabriel Huiban; Karen Amanda Reifer; Kerrie Thomas-Armstrong; Thomas-Ray Armstrong	Huiban	2:52
9.	"Set Me Free" (featuring Grano)	Mika Moupondo; Cotoi; Radu	Cotoi; Radu; Moupondo	3:55
10.	"Celebrate"	Stan; Radu; McCollum; Henderson; Cotoi	Radu	3:27
11.	"Happy"	Victor Bourosu; Stan; McCollum; Henderson	Bourosu	3:30
12.	"Thanks for Leaving"	McCollum; Henderson; Sebastian Jacome; Cotoi	Cotoi; Jacome	3:36
13.	"Holding Aces"	Crishan; Angelica Vasilcov; Coleman; Stan; Cotoi; Radu	Crishan; Cotoi; Radu	3:23
14.	"Unlocked"	Cotoi; Bourosu; Stan; Mika Moupondo	Cotoi; Bourosu	8:14
15.	"Dance" (Grano Remix)	Cotoi; Stan; Mika Moupondo; McCollum; Basasteanu	Cotoi	4:18
Total length:				57:22

Japanese standard edition
No.	Title	Writer(s)	Length
1.	"Little Lies"		3:42
2.	"Cherry Pop"		3:12
3.	"Dance"		3:42
4.	"Back to Light"		3:35
5.	"Give Me Your Everything"		3:26
6.	"Kiss Me Goodbye"		3:19
7.	"Digital"	Lidbom; Claire Rodrigues Lee	3:50
8.	"Zoom Zoom"	Lidbom; Anne Judith Wik; Nermin Harambasic; Ronny Svendsen	3:26
9.	"Set Me Free" (featuring Grano)		3:55
10.	"Celebrate"		3:28
11.	"Happy"		3:30
12.	"Thanks for Leaving"		3:37
13.	"Holding Aces"		3:24
14.	"Dance" (Grano Remix)		4:19
15.	"Cherry Pop" (Sonic-E & Woolhouse Remix)		3:05
Total length:			53:30

Japanese deluxe edition
No.	Title	Length
1.	"Little Lies"	3:42
2.	"Cherry Pop"	3:12
3.	"Dance"	3:42
4.	"Back to Light"	3:35
5.	"Give Me Your Everything"	3:26
6.	"Kiss Me Goodbye"	3:19
7.	"Digital"	3:50
8.	"Zoom Zoom"	3:26
9.	"Vanilla Chocolat" (featuring Connect-R)	3:18
10.	"Trumpet Blows"	2:54
11.	"Set Me Free" (featuring Grano)	3:54
12.	"Celebrate"	3:28
13.	"Happy"	3:30
14.	"Thanks for Leaving"	3:37
15.	"Holding Aces"	3:25
16.	"Unlocked"	8:14
17.	"Dance" (Grano Remix)	4:19
18.	"Cherry Pop" (Sonic-E & Woolhouse Remix)	3:05
Total length:		68:06

Japanese deluxe edition DVD
No.	Title	Length
1.	"Cherry Pop" (music video)	3:21
2.	"Dance" (music video)	3:44
3.	"Give Me Your Everything" (music video)	3:30
4.	"Thanks for Leaving" (music video)	4:10
5.	"Credits"	0:18
Total length:		15:03

Spanish standard edition
No.	Title	Length
1.	"Little Lies"	3:42
2.	"Dance"	3:42
3.	"Cherry Pop"	3:12
4.	"Back to Light"	3:35
5.	"Give Me Your Everything"	3:26
6.	"Kiss Me Goodbye"	3:19
7.	"Vanilla Chocolat" (featuring Connect-R)	3:18
8.	"Trumpet Blows"	2:52
9.	"Set Me Free" (featuring Grano)	3:54
10.	"Celebrate"	3:28
11.	"Happy"	3:30
12.	"Thanks for Leaving"	3:37
13.	"Holding Aces"	3:25
14.	"Unlocked"	8:14
Total length:		53:12

Spanish standard edition (Remixes)
No.	Title	Length
1.	"Dance" (Geo Da Silva & Jack Mazzoni Radio Edit)	3:16
2.	"Dance" (CryDuom Radio Edit)	3:16
3.	"Dance" (DJ Kone & Marc Palacios Radio Edit)	3:43
4.	"Dance" (Grano Remix)	4:18
5.	"Cherry Pop" (DJ Kone & Marc Palacios Radio Edit)	3:33
6.	"Cherry Pop" (Geo Da Silva & Jack Mazzoni Radio Remix)	3:15
7.	"Cherry Pop" (CryDuom Remix Radio)	3:13
8.	"Dance" (Geo Da Silva & Jack Mazzoni Extended Remix)	4:03
9.	"Dance" (CryDuom Extended Remix)	4:19
10.	"Dance" (DJ Kone & Marc Palacios Extended Remix)	6:25
11.	"Cherry Pop" (DJ Kone & Marc Palacios Extended Remix)	6:24
12.	"Cherry Pop" (Geo Da Silva & Jack Mazzoni Extended Remix)	4:17
13.	"Cherry Pop" (Cry Duom Extended Remix)	4:02

German standard edition
No.	Title	Writer(s)	Producer(s)	Length
1.	"We Wanna" (with Inna featuring Daddy Yankee)	Andreas Schuller; Jacob Luttrell; Thomas Troelsen; Ramon Ayala	Schuller; Troelsen	3:52
2.	"Little Lies"			3:42
3.	"Dance"			3:42
4.	"Cherry Pop"			3:12
5.	"Back to Light"			3:35
6.	"Give Me Your Everything"			3:26
7.	"Kiss Me Goodbye"			3:19
8.	"Vanilla Chocolat" (featuring Connect-R)			3:18
9.	"Trumpet Blows"			2:52
10.	"Set Me Free" (featuring Grano)			3:54
11.	"Celebrate"			3:28
12.	"Happy"			3:30
13.	"Thanks for Leaving"			3:37
14.	"Holding Aces"			3:25
15.	"Unlocked"			8:14
16.	"Dance" (Grano Remix)			4:18
Total length:				61:14

== Personnel ==
Credits adapted from the liner notes of Unlocked.

Locations

- Produced for Fonogram Music Production in Bucharest, Romania.
- Produced for Hitfire Production in Uppsala, Sweden.

Vocals

- Alexandra Stan – lead vocals
- Jade Burges – vocal sample
- Connect-R – featured artist

Creative and visual

- David Gal – art direction, packaging design, creative director
- Griffon & Swans – art direction, packaging design, creative director
- Dimitri Caceaune – creative director, photography
- Alex Ifimov – hair stylist, make-up artist
- Ema Băniță – styling assistant
- Andra Moga – styling

== Charts ==
Chart performance for Unlocked
Chart (2014)	Peak position
Japanese Albums (Oricon)	21

== Release history ==
=== Digital releases ===
Digital releases of Unlocked
Region	Date	Label	Edition(s)
Japan	27 August 2014	Victor	Standard
Japan	24 December 2014	Victor	Deluxe
Turkey	25 November 2014	Yeni Dünya	Standard
Various	25 November 2014	Fonogram, Roton	Standard
Italy	16 December 2014	Ego	Standard
Spain	24 February 2015	Blanco y Negro	Standard
Germany	7 August 2015	Kontor	Standard

=== Physical releases ===
Physical releases of Unlocked
Region	Date	Label	Edition(s)
Japan	27 August 2014	Victor	Standard
Japan	24 December 2014	Victor	Deluxe + DVD
Spain	N/A 2014	Blanco y Negro	Standard
Turkey	N/A 2014	Yeni Dünya	Standard
Australia	N/A 2015	Central Station; Fonogram	Standard
Germany	N/A 2015	Fonogram	Standard
Romania	N/A 2015	Roton	Standard

== See also ==
- List of music released by Romanian artists that has charted in major music markets
