= Boy Oh Boy (Alexandra Stan song) =

Single by Alexandra Stan

from the album Mami
- Released: 30 June 2017
- Genre: Electropop
- Length: 3:19
- Label: Alexandra Stan
- Songwriter(s): Andy Grasu; Marius Mirică; Alexandra Stan
- Producer(s): Marius Mirică; Alexandra Stan

Alexandra Stan singles chronology
"Siempre Tú" (2017)	"Boy Oh Boy" (2017)	"Noi doi" (2017)

"Boy Oh Boy" is a song recorded by Romanian singer Alexandra Stan for her fourth studio album, Mami (2018). It was digitally released on 30 June 2017 through Alexandra Stan Records, her own label, due to the singer's desire to work independently. The track was written by Andy Grasu, Marius Mirică and Stan, while production was handled by Mirică and Stan. Musically, "Boy Oh Boy" is a 90s-influenced electropop song with dancehall and reggae elements revolving around a girl's need to be loved and Stan's volatile relationship with her partner.

Music critics were positive towards "Boy Oh Boy", praising its vibe and summery style. An accompanying music video for the track was uploaded onto Stan's official YouTube channel simultaneously with the single's release. Shot by Bogdan Păun in Kuala Lumpur, it features Stan walking through the city and a food warehouse. She confessed that she wanted to capture Asian culture in the video.

== Background and composition ==
"Boy Oh Boy"
A 19-second sample of "Boy Oh Boy", an electropop song with dancehall and reggae influences talking about the girls' need to be loved and Stan's volatile relationship with her partner.

"Boy Oh Boy" was written by Andy Grasu, Marius Mirică and Stan, with production handled by Mirică and Stan. Both Narcotic Creation and representatives of Alexandra Stan Records served as co-producers. The single was made available for digital download on 30 June 2017 by Alexandra Stan Records, the singer's own label, as she desired to work independently.

"Boy Oh Boy" is a 90s–influenced electropop song with dancehall and reggae elements. Regarding its style, Stan confessed, "I want to release what I like and not to follow the trend and speed up the creation process just because something needs to be released. [The song] is a mixture of [different] styles. I would say it is a more '90s track but with a contemporary feel". On another occasion, the singer described the single as an "old kind of style, but a new style. It's like eurodance." According to her, the lyrical message is "[her way] of expressing the girls' need to be loved [...] and sometimes you just need to tell to the guy, 'tell me that you love me'". Jonathan Currinn from CelebMix noted, "As for the meaning behind the song, the lyrics suggest a relationship where a guy is always breaking her heart even though she knows that he actually cares for her. Such a deep emotional message behind this infectious tune."

== Critical reception ==
Music critics were positive towards "Boy Oh Boy". Teodora Dinu from Antena 1 found the song had a positive vibe and was full of energy. Another editor from the same website applauded the summery style and danceable rhythm of the track. Currinn from CelebMix praised Stan's vocal delivery and saw "Boy Oh Boy" as the "perfect" transition from her previous single "9 Lives" (2017) due to its reggae vibes, although noting Stan took a new direction: "She keeps to her usual style, adding flavour, texture, and progression."

== Music video ==
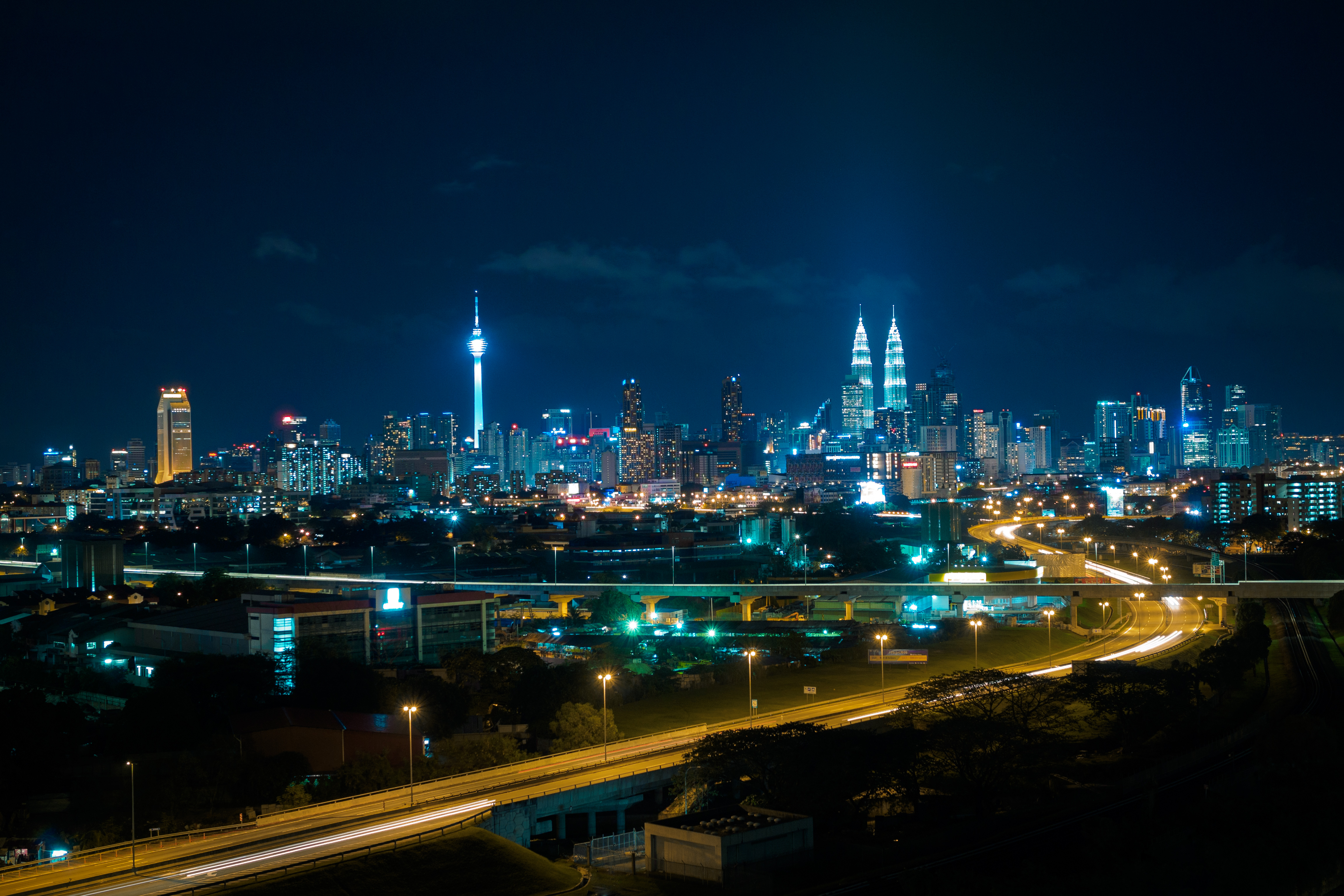
The music video was shot by Bogdan Păun in Kuala Lumpur, Malaysia (pictured).

Stan first confirmed the release of an accompanying music video shot in Kuala Lumpur, Malaysia in an article on her website. A first teaser was uploaded onto the singer's YouTube channel on 25 June 2017, lasting 25 seconds and showing her "out in the rain, on a motorbike, and with an orange ponytail". Stan also posted various behind-the-scenes pictures on her Instagram account, followed by a second teaser released on 27 June 2017. The preview lasted 17 seconds, and showcased a portion of the song and its lyrics.

The music video premiered on 30 June 2017. It was shot by Bogdan Păun from the production company NGM Creative, with Alexandru Mureșan serving as the director of photography. Alex Ifimov did the make-up and hair styling for the video, and collaborated with Ema Băniță for its styling. Regarding the clip, the singer said, "I have an affinity for Asia, and I wanted to capture the Asian culture and atmosphere on the streets, the people and their customs. I met many lovely people that helped us with the filming and even wanted to appear in the clip. It was an unforgettable experience."

The clip starts with Stan sitting on stairs in front of a temple, wearing pink clothing and an orange ponytail attached to her hair. Following this, she walks through the city interacting with the people, and performs to the song in what appears to be a food warehouse, wearing an orange top and a black and white coat. The video continues in a similar style and ends with her in front of skyscrapers. A writer from Antena 1 found that Stan's appearance in the music video was "the hottest [...] of the year", while Currinn of CelebMix compared it to her previous works, writing, "she brings her usual stage presence and energetic vibes, whilst managing to display a relaxed vigour". Yannick Murgalé of Aficia suggested that the singer is "more sober, but always so attractive."

== Track listing ==
Digital download
No.	Title	Length
1.	"Boy Oh Boy"	3:19

== Credits and personnel ==
Credits adapted from the official music video.

Technical and composing credits

- Narcotic Creation – co-producer
- Andy Grasu – composer
- Marius Mirică – composer, producer
- Alexandra Stan – lead vocals, composer, producer
- Alexandra Stan Records – co-producer

Visual credits

- Ema Băniță – styling
- Alex Ifimov – make-up, hair styling, styling
- Alexandru Mureșan − director of photography
- Bogdan Păun (NGM Creative) – director

== Release history ==
Territory	Date	Format(s)	Label
Romania	30 June 2017	Digital download	Alexandra Stan
Japan	13 December 2017	Digital download	Alexandra Stan
Italy	28 September 2018	Digital download; radio airplay	CDF
