= Dance (Alexandra Stan song) =

Single by Alexandra Stan

from the album Unlocked
- Released: 16 July 2014
- Recorded: 2014; Fonogram Studios (Bucharest, Romania)
- Genre: Dance; house
- Length: 3:41
- Label: Victor; Roton; Blanco y Negro; Ego; Vae Victis; Kontor
- Songwriters: Cosmin Basasteanu; Alexandru Cotoi; Lee Anna McCollum; Mika Moupondo; Alexandra Stan
- Producers: Alexandru Cotoi; Erik Lidbom

Alexandra Stan singles chronology
"Cherry Pop" (2014)	"Dance" (2014)	"Give Me Your Everything" (2014)

"Dance" is a song recorded by Romanian recording artist Alexandra Stan for her second studio album, Unlocked (2014). The track was made available for digital download on 16 July 2014, as the album's third single. "Dance" was written by Stan, Cosmin Basasteanu, Alexandru Cotoi, Lee Anna McCollum, Mika Moupondo and Erik Lidbom, while production was handled by both Cazan and Lidbom. A music video for the song was directed by Khaled Mokhtar and debuted on Stan's YouTube channel on 18 July 2014, where it has since amassed over ten million views. The clip was shot over three days in Bucharest, Romania and sees Stan and her backup dancers performing choreographed dances, which were choreographed by Romanian performer Emil Rengle.

The recording was met with positive reviews. Digital Journal praised the song for being "catchy", and Stan for providing "honey-rich" vocals. In an interview, Alexandra Stan explained that "Dance" is a "very sexy club song and club image". The track was performed during Stan's Unlocked Tour (2014). The song became a success in Japan, where it ranked at number 25 on the Japan Hot 100.

== Composition ==
"Dance"
A 20-second sample of the song, showcasing its end. Digital Journal described the vocals that Stan provides for this part as "honey-rich".

"Dance" was recorded at Fonogram Studios in Bucharest, Romania. Stan first thought of the song's melody and lyrics in Paris, and later brought her idea for further development by her team at Fonogram Records, led by producers Alexandru Cotoi and Mika Moupondo. The song is a dance track, also incorporating house music influences into its sound. The track opens with acoustic guitar chords, which are then followed by a pop strophe. The refrain consists of a saxophone drop, which is backed by cut saws and plucks. "Dance" ends with the last lyrics of the song being backed by acoustic guitar. Lyrically, the track speaks about the art of dancing, but also features references to friendship and romance. Markos Papadatos from Digital Journal pointed out the opening lyrics of the song for beginning rebellious, but turning into positive and optimistic. He also compared the instrumentation of "Dance" with that one of Kesha's "Die Young".

== Critical response ==
Markos Papadatos from Digital Journal compared "Dance" to Stan's 2010 song "Mr. Saxobeat", confessing that the song "has a catchy melody". He went on praising Stan's "honey-rich" voice on the verses "Why don't you dance dance dance / and fall in love with friends / let's start a new romance". Furthermore, Papadatos said that the track deserves to top the Billboard Hot Dance Club Songs charts. Concerning the music video of "Dance", he praised Khaled Mokhtar for doing a "brilliant job directing [the clip]", and Emil Rengle for choreographing "the dancers and Stan in the video exceptionally well". He went on saying that Stan "looks breathtakingly beautiful in this video". Papadatos gave the music video and the song itself an A rating. Direct Lyrics praised "Dance" for having "enough summer flavour to do well this upcoming hot season" and confessed that they like the track better than its predecessor, "Cherry Pop". Los 40 Principales cited the video for "Dance" as one of Stan's best clips ever.

== Track listings ==
- Digital download
1. "Dance" – 3:41
- Italian digital download
1. "Dance" (Radio Edit) – 3:41
2. "Dance" (Grano Remix) – 4:18
- German digital remix EP
1. "Dance" (Radio Edit) – 3:41
2. "Dance" (Grano Remix) – 4:18
- Spanish digital remix EP
1. "Dance" (Geo Da Silva & Jack Mazzoni Radio Edit) – 3:16
2. "Dance" (DJ Kone & Marc Palacios Radio Edit) – 3:43
3. "Dance" (CryDuom Radio Edit) – 3:16
4. "Dance" (Geo Da Silva & Jack Mazzoni Remix) – 4:03
5. "Dance" (DJ Kone & Marc Palacios Remix) – 6:25
6. "Dance" (CryDuom Extended) – 3:58

== Credits and personnel ==
Credits adapted from the liner notes of Unlocked and The Collection.

Recording and vocal credits

- Recorded at Fonogram Studios in Bucharest, Romania.
- Produced for Fonogram Music Production in Bucharest, Romania.
- Alexandra Stan – lead vocals

Technical and songwriting credits

- Cosmin Basasteanu – songwriter
- Alexandru Cotoi – songwriter, mixing, producer
- Erik Lidbom – songwriter, mixing engineer
- Mika Moupondo – songwriter
- Lee Anna McCollum – songwriter

Visual credits

- Alex Ifimov – make-up artist, hairstyling
- Oana Imbrea – producing coordinator
- Laurent Marel – colorist
- Andra Moga – styling
- Khaled Mokhtar – director of photography, regisor
- Emil Rengle – choreography

== Charts ==
Weekly chart performance for "Dance"
Chart (2014)	Peak position
Austria (Ö3 Austria Top 40)	70
Japan (Japan Hot 100)	64
Turkey (Turkish Singles Chart)	6

Annual chart rankings for "Dance"
Chart (2014)	Rank
Japan Adult Contemporary (Billboard)	87

== Release history ==
Country	Date	Format	Label
Japan	16 July 2014	Digital single	Victor Entertainment
Romania	18 July 2014	Digital single	Roton
Spain	2 September 2014	Digital single	Blanco y Negro
Spain	23 December 2014	Digital remix EP	Blanco y Negro
Italy	12 September 2014	Digital single	Ego/ Vae Victis
Germany	26 September 2014	Digital remix EP	Kontor Records

== See also ==
- List of music released by Romanian artists that has charted in major music markets
