= Gary Caos =

Italian DJ and producer

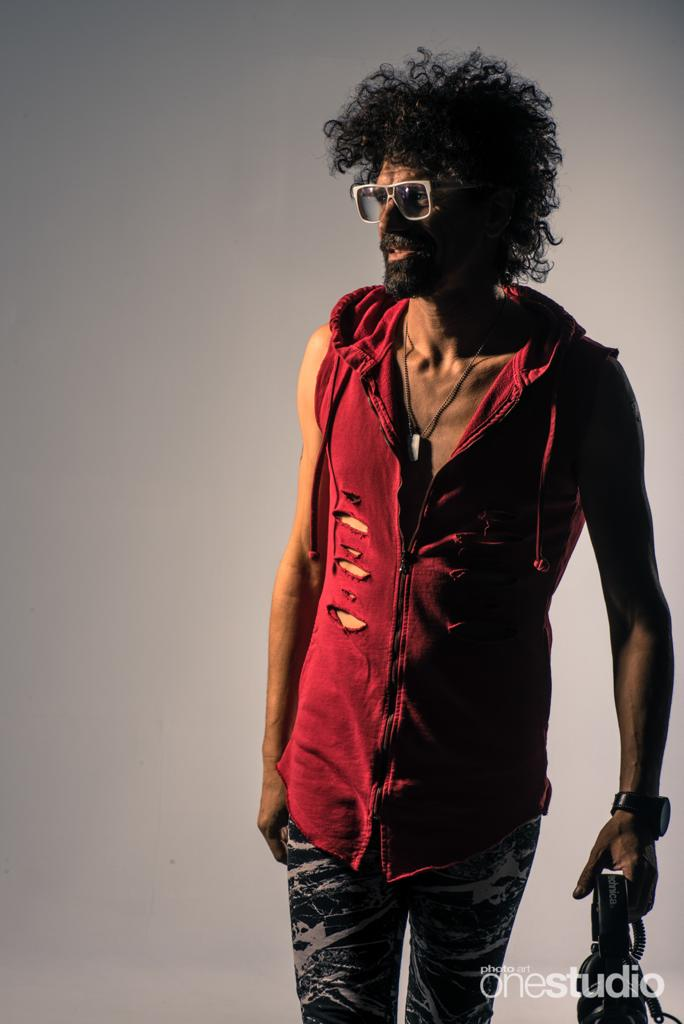

Background information
- Origin: Italy
- Genre: Deep house
- Occupations: DJ; producer; musician
- Labels: Casa Rossa; Spinnin' Records
- Website: http://www.garycaos.com

Gary Caos (real name Gherardo Casini) is an Italian DJ, producer and radio speaker. He is known for several top chart house music productions that topped the Beatport charts. He produced songs with and for international artists such as Pitbull, In-Grid, Leandro Da Silva (with the release "Cafè" out for Spinnin' Records) and also produced the official remix of the classic "Hit the Road Jack" by Ray Charles. He also collaborated with fellow Italian DJ Glovibes, titled "Watch Out". He is set to feature in the Miami Music Week 2017 event "House Stars" on 22 March 2017.

In 2018 he joined Peter Kharma's side projects Slicerboys and Italian Disco Mafia with the Italian singer Antonio Mezzancella. In his career he produced more than 200 tracks for the labels: Armada, Ultra, Ministry Of Sound, Universal, StreetKing, HedKandi, EGO, Time Records, Warner Music.

He is the founder of the record label "Casa Rossa" (transl. "Red House", founded in 2009).

== Discography ==
=== Releases ===
Title	Featuring	Year	Label
Disco Inferno	Adrian Michaels	2021	Casa Rossa
Love Love Love	Lopez, Gary Nesta Pine	2020	Casa Rossa
Prainha (Peter Kharma & Gary Caos Mix)	Slicerboys, Peter Kharma	2020	Whitepromo
Going Down		2020	RH2
Boogie Wonder		2020	Casa Rossa
Kalimba De Luna	Luca Garaboni, Gary Caos, Tony Esposito	2020	Casa Rossa
Rescue Me		2019	Club Session
Get On Up		2019	InStereo Recordings
Listen To The Beat	Slicerboys, Peter Kharma	2019	Casa Rossa
I'm Burning	Soliaris, House Of Virus	2018	Warner Music Group
Lots More Moving	Frankie Gada, Gary Caos	2018	Casa Rossa
Smoke Everyday		2017	Casa Rossa
Cafè	Leandro Da Silva	2017	Spinnin' Records
Festa (Gary Caos Remix)	Sud Sound System, Danilo Secli	2016	Smilax
Freak Out		2016	Electroscene
When The Love Gets In The Way	Damon Grey, Michael Murica, R.O.N.N.	2016	RH2
I House You (Gary Caos Remix)	Code3000	2015	I House You
Dance With You	Peter Brown, Jerome Robins	2014	Reflective Music
Soul Power		2013	Casa Rossa
Push The Button		2013	Ego
La Trompette	Rico Bernasconi, In-Grid	2012	Energy Production
Mama Lover (Gary Caos Remix)	Serebro	2012	Ego
Specialize In Love		2012	Armada Music
Hit the Road Jack (Official Remix)	Ray Charles	2010	Time Records
Get Phunky	Jellyboyz, Gary Caos	2010	Frequenza
Immature	Renee	2009	Casa Rossa
Madre Terra		2009	Casa Rossa

=== Charted singles ===
Title	Year	Peak chart positions	
Title	Year	US Dance	US Club
"Watch Out" (with Glovibes)	2016	47	7
