= Mami (album) =

- Artwork used for the international version of the album. The covers for the Japanese releases feature the same shot of Stan edited differently.

Studio album by Alexandra Stan
- Released: 25 April 2018
- Recorded: Los Angeles, United States
- Genre: Dance-pop
- Length: 25:22
- Language: English; French; Romanian; Spanish
- Label: Alexandra Stan; Victor
- Producer: Sergiu Ene; Castel Pavel Danileanu; Enri Demi; Katie DiCicco; Jay Freedom; Adam Kulling; Marius Mirică; Andrei Sorin Ovezea; Alex Parker; Laurențiu Popescu; Alexandra Stan; Simon Says; Cristian Ștefănescu; Suark; Cristian Tarcea; Christian Theodoru; Clayton Williams

Alexandra Stan chronology
Alesta (2016)	Mami (2018)	Rainbows (2022)

Singles from Mami
- 1. "Boy Oh Boy" Released: 30 June 2017; 2. "Noi doi" Released: 8 August 2017; 3. "Mami" Released: 14 February 2018

Mami is the fourth studio album by Romanian singer Alexandra Stan. It was released on 25 April 2018 in digital and physical formats by Alexandra Stan Records and Victor Entertainment. Stan collaborated with producers from multiple countries, including Marius Mirică, Alex Parker, Laurențiu Popescu, Simon Says, Cristian Ștefănescu and Cristian Tarcea. She recorded Mami in Los Angeles, United States, where she relocated with her boyfriend in September 2017. The singer was involved in the writing process of several songs featured on the album.

Music critic Jonathan Currinn of website CelebMix gave Mami a mixed review. While picking several tracks as highlights and praising the contributions of the featured artists on the album, he criticized selected songs as "rushed" and unfinished. Musically, Mami has been described as a Latin-inspired dance-pop album; according to Stan, influences include pop, reggae and Balkan music. The singer also said that the album's title represents her femininity and artistic maturity. Mami was preceded by the release of three singles, "Boy Oh Boy" (2017), "Noi doi" (2017) and "Mami" (2018), to minor success in Romania, as well as the promotional single "Favorite Game". The album itself reached number 119 on the Japanese Oricon Albums Chart. Stan promoted it with live appearances in Japan, as well in Europe and Canada.

== Background and release ==
Alexandra Stan initially referred to the album as AS4 in a late 2017 interview with a Brazilian website, and confirmed that it would be released in 2018. At that time, she had begun to record new material for the record, which she described as "pop ballads, with a touch of reggae, or Balkanic sounds". In September 2017, Stan bought a residence in Los Angeles, United States with her boyfriend Bogdan Stăruială, where she went to local studios to record and compose material for three months as of December 2017. The tracklist for the Japanese edition of Mami was unveiled during one of Stan's Facebook posts on 6 April 2018. She originally announced that the record would be released at the end of February or at the beginning of March 2018. Stan elaborated on the album's title:

"[It] is not chosen by chance, with it celebrating the Latin, loving mother, mother of 'all lost boys,' who always thinks about the happiness of others, but at the same time forgets to be careful with herself, to love herself and to be the beloved 'caliente' wife that any man desires. Each [of my] album[s] suggests a stage in my life as a woman [...], and at the age of 28, I can say I am the oldest [in my career], so the album is called Mami. I know who I am, what I want and where I go."

For Mami, Stan collaborated with several record producers from Switzerland, Sweden, Canada, the United States and Romania, while also being involved in the writing process of nearly all songs. Mixing and mastering was handled at Sterling Sound in New York City by Luigi Barone, Narcotic Creation, Caloway the Donuts, Serge Courtois, Rappy Sergio, Thrace Music and Cole Nystorm. The album was made available in digital and physical formats on 25 April 2018 in Japan by Alexandra Stan Records and Victor Entertainment, respectively. A deluxe edition, containing a bonus DVD with the music videos produced for the album's singles, was released on the same date by the latter label. Mami was later released in Italy on 15 June, and in various other countries on 15 August 2018.

== Composition ==
"Boy Oh Boy"
A 19-second sample of "Boy Oh Boy", an electropop song with dancehall and reggae influences talking about a girl's need to be loved and Stan's relationship with her partner.

A writer of Antena 1 labelled Mami a Latin-influenced dance-pop album, noting that "the songs are composed in such a way to rensemble all of Stan's fans, regardless of their nationalities." The record's international version starts with "Rablaton", an English and Spanish Latin pop song that Jonathan Currinn of website CelebMix likened to the works of Barbadian singer Rihanna and Australian rapper Iggy Azalea. It is followed by "Mami", a trilingual song combining English, French and Spanish; its lyrics deal with feminity. Mami continues with "You Used to Know" and "Ou La La", with the latter being entirely written in French and having sex-inspired lyrics that feature Stan tantalisingly asking questions. The fourth track on Mami, "India", features American rapper Kent Archie. Currinn described it as an experimental "progressive, adventure song" musically inspired by The Lion King.

Dominican singer Jenn Morel features on the tropical song "Whine It Up". Stan sings in a higher octave, while Morel provides an "afrobeat rap". The next track, "Thinking About You", opens up with "90's bubblegum pop/club/house beats", which Currinn found reminiscent of Australian singer Kylie Minogue's older material. Closing the album, "Round & Round" features multiple instruments in its backing track. "Boy Oh Boy", featured solely on the Italian and Japanese versions of Mami, is a 1990s–influenced electropop song with dancehall and reggae elements. It lyrically revolves around a girl's need to be loved and Stan's volatile relationship with her partner. Similarly not included on the record's international issue, "Noi doi" is entirely written in Romanian and has the singer asking her love interest to spend time at the beach with her.

== Critical reception ==
Currinn of CelebMix gave a mixed review of Mami's international version. He found it disappointing that the album solely featured eight tracks and lacked the songs "Boy Oh Boy", "Noi doi" and "Favorite Game" in comparison to earlier versions of Mami released. Currinn praised the contribution from Archie and Morel, as well as Stan's vocal delivery on multiple tracks. He picked "Rablaton", "You Used to Know" and "Round & Round" as highlights on the record. However, Currinn labelled the song "India" as "unpolished", and also criticized "Whine It Up" as "rushed". He suggested Stan sings in a tonality that does not suit her, and wrote that "the backing track is too Coca-Cola tropical". Currinn concluded his review: "We know Stan can do better, but it does open up new directions for her and we’re excited to see what new music she brings to the industry."

== Singles and promotion ==
"Boy Oh Boy" was released as the first single from Mami on 30 June 2017 through Stan's newly founded Alexandra Stan Records. "Noi doi" was made available as the second single on 8 August 2017, reaching number 80 in Stan's native country. The album's homonymous and last single was self-released on 4 April 2018. Accompanying music videos were produced for all aforementioned singles, including one for the Japan-only promotional release "Favorite Game", which was featured on the soundtrack of Japanese movie Miko Girl (2017). Stan promoted Mami with concert dates in Poland (Sopot Hit Festival), Turkey, Romania, Canada and Japan from mid August to early September 2018.

== Track listing ==
Credits adapted from the liner notes of Mami.

Mami – International edition
No.	Title	Writer(s)	Producer(s)	Length
1.	"Rablaton"	Stan	Sergiu Ene; Enri Demi	2:57
2.	"Mami"	Katie DiCicco; Stan	Simon Says; DiCicco	3:32
3.	"You Used to Know"	Stan	Ene; Demi	3:13
4.	"Ou La La"	Lucian Darie; Demi; Ene; Ovidiu Nicolae; Stan	Ene; Demi	3:23
5.	"India" (featuring Kent Archie)	Archie; Stan	Ene; Demi	3:40
6.	"Whine It Up" (featuring Jenn Morel)	DiCicco; Joelii; Morel; Stan	Clayton Williams; Jay Freedom; DiCicco	2:39
7.	"Thinking About You" (featuring Surak)	DiCicco; Stan; Cameron Stymeist	Suark; DiCicco; Stymeist^{[a]}	2:56
8.	"Round & Round"	Ninos Hanna; Adam Kulling; Eric Riddick; Stan	Kulling; Andrei Sorin Ovezea; Christian Theodoru; Castel Pavel Danileanu	2:57
Total length:				25:22

Japanese standard version
No.	Title	Writer(s)	Producer(s)	Length
1.	"Mami"			3:34
2.	"Boy Oh Boy"	Andy Grasu; Marius Mirică; Stan	Mirică; Stan	3:19
3.	"India" (featuring Kent Archie)			3:42
4.	"Round & Round"			2:57
5.	"Whine It Up" (featuring Jenn Morel)			2:40
6.	"Ou La La"			3:22
7.	"Thinking About You" (featuring Suark)			2:58
8.	"You Used to Know"			3:14
9.	"Rablaton"			2:56
10.	"Noi doi"	Chriss JustUs; Stan	Alex Parker; Laurențiu Popescu; Stan; Cristian Tarcea	3:25
11.	"Favorite Game"	Austin Jesse Mitchell; Cristian Ștefănescu	Ștefănescu	3:03
Total length:				35:16

Japanese deluxe edition DVD
No.	Title	Length
1.	"Mami" (music video)	3:34
2.	"Boy Oh Boy" (music video)	3:21
3.	"Noi doi" (music video)	3:25
4.	"Favorite Game" (music video)	3:03
Total length:		13:23

Italian standard edition
No.	Title	Length
1.	"Mami"	3:32
2.	"Round & Round"	2:57
3.	"You Used to Know"	3:13
4.	"Whine It Up" (featuring Jenn Morel)	2:39
5.	"Boy Oh Boy"	3:19
6.	"Noi doi"	3:24
7.	"Oh La La"	3:23
8.	"India" (featuring Kent Archie)	3:40
9.	"Thinking About You" (featuring Suark)	2:56
10.	"Rablaton"	2:57
Total length:		32:01

Notes

- ^{^[a]} signifies an additional producer

== Charts ==
Chart performance for Mami
Chart (2018)	Peak position
Japanese Albums (Oricon)	119

== Release history ==
Release history and formats for Mami
Region	Date	Format	Label	Edition(s)	Ref.
Japan	25 April 2018	Digital download	Alexandra Stan	Standard	
Japan	25 April 2018	CD	Victor	Standard; deluxe	
Italy	15 June 2018	Digital download	CDF	Standard	
Various	15 August 2018	Digital download	Alexandra Stan	Standard	

== See also ==
- List of music released by Romanian artists that has charted in major music markets
