= I Think I Love It =

Single by Alexandra Stan

from the album Rainbows
- Released: 28 June 2019
- Genre: Reggae pop
- Length: 3:00
- Label: Universal
- Songwriters: Krishane; Radu Bolfea
- Producers: Alexandra Stan; Bolfea; Cătălin Safta; Achi; Adelina Stinga; Vlad Lucan

Alexandra Stan singles chronology
"Mami" (2018)	"I Think I Love It" (2019)	"Obsesii" (2020)

Music video
- "I Think I Love It" on YouTube

"I Think I Love It" is a song by Romanian singer Alexandra Stan, digitally released through Universal Music Romania on 28 June 2019 as the first single from Stan’s fifth album Rainbows. It was written by Krishane and Radu Bolfea, while the production was handled by Stan, Bolfea, Cătălin Safta, Achi, Adelina Stinga and Vlad Lucan. A reggae pop track, the song's lyrics discuss the theme of love and freedom. An accompanying music video for the song was uploaded to Stan's YouTube channel on 1 July 2019, directed by Criss Blaziny. Making use of several explicit scenes, it features the singer and model Geni Olaru driving a red Corvette car and posing in different ways. Further promoted by several live performances, the song peaked at number 38 on Romania's Airplay 100 ranking.

== Background and composition ==
"I Think I Love It" was released for digital download on 28 June 2019 by Universal Music Romania in various countries. Prior to release, Stan had spent several months in the United States, following which she signed new record deals with the aforementioned label and MediaPro Music. The song served as her first single in over a year after "Mami" (2018). It was written by Krishane and Radu Bolfea, while production was handled by Stan, Bolfea, Cătălin Safta, Achi, Adelina Stinga and Vlad Lucan; the latter also provided mixing and mastering. A reggae pop track, the genre is further emphasized by a "producer" hook featured throughout. The lyrics "paint a picture of being in love and the good and happy feelings that come with that", as well as reminding "us to take risks, to fall in love, to dance and to do the most crazy things".

== Music video and promotion ==
An accompanying music video for "I Think I Love It" was uploaded to Stan's official YouTube channel on 1 July 2019. It was directed by Criss Blaziny in Constanța, Romania, and features the guest appearance from model Geani Olaru. The colorful video begins with Stan topless underneath a pink polyester jacket, pink hot pants and cowboy boots, alongside Olaru driving a red Corvette car, stopping for the singer to interact with a butterfly and pose in front of a pink screen board. Following this, she can be seen sporting a green long-sleeved wet suit in front of the same board. She further wears a red heart as a top alongside jeweled pink hot pants in front of another large board, patterned with bananas and LED border lights, in the clip's next scene. The video closes out with scenes of Stan and Olaru covering themselves in mud. Jonathan Currinn of CelebMix praised the display of "confidence, sexiness, and a sense of feeling free", while he also noted the heavy use of explicit imagery. Stan posted explicit pictures from the music video's filming process on her social media, with them gaining attention on the internet and in Romanian press.

For further promotion, Stan performed "I Think I Love It" live for Romanian radio station Kiss FM on 15 July 2019, alongside a cover of "Dancing with a Stranger" (2019) by Sam Smith and Normani. Writing for CelebMix, Currinn thought that Stan "impress[ed] to no end", describing her as "giving off a relaxed vibe when she sang" and praising her vocals as "on-point throughout sounding just like the studio track". On 18 July, the singer sang the song for Virgin Radio Romania, also covering "Bad Guy" (2019) by Billie Eilish. Stan made further appearances to perform "I Think I Love It" on Pro FM, and on Romanian television show Vorbește lumea throughout the same month.

== Credits and personnel ==
Credits adapted from YouTube.

- Achi – producer
- Krishane – songwriter
- Radu Bolfea – songwriter, producer
- Vlad Lucan – producer, mixing, mastering
- Cătălin Safta – producer
- Alexandra Stan – lead vocals, producer
- Adelina Stinga – producer

== Track listing ==
- Digital download
1. "I Think I Love It" – 3:00

== Charts ==
Chart (2019)	Peak position
Romania (Airplay 100)	38
Romania TV Airplay (Media Forest)	16

== Release history ==
Country	Date	Format(s)	Label	Ref.
Various	28 June 2019	Digital download	Universal	
