= Glovibes =

Italian DJ and producer

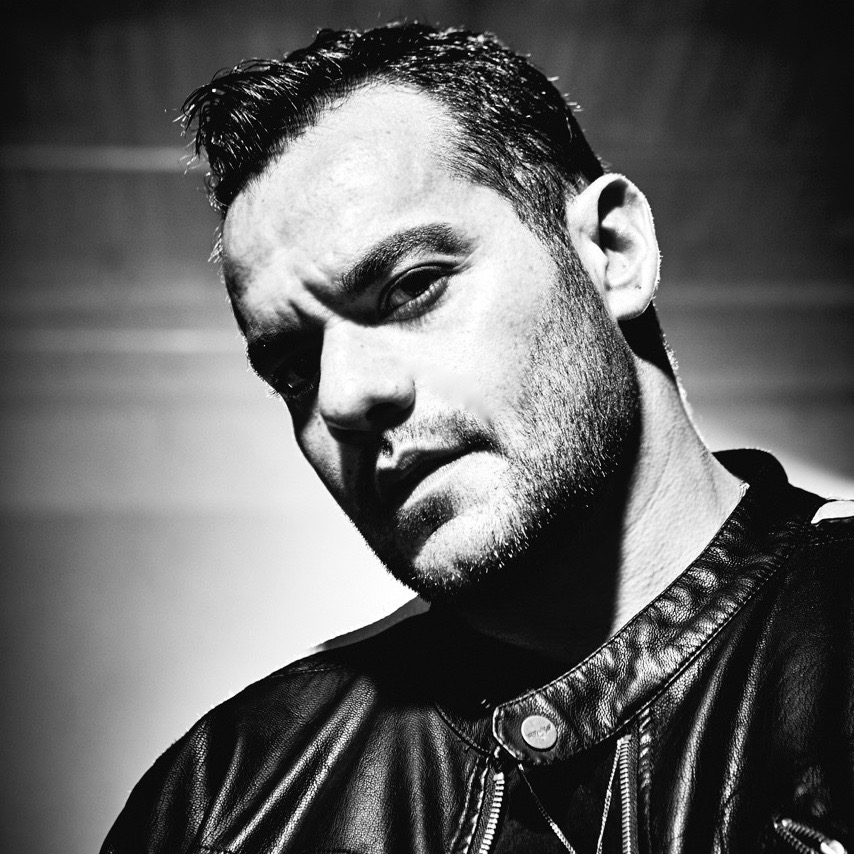

Background information
- Birth name: Leonardo Abbate
- Origin: Italy; London, U.K. Los Angeles, U.S.
- Genres: Deep house; future house
- Occupations: DJ; producer; musician
- Instrument: Digital audio workstation
- Labels: Go Deeva; Casa Rossa; Area 94; Scavo World Music; Bonanza
- Website: glovibes.com

Leonardo Abbate, better known by his stage name Glovibes, is an Italian DJ and music producer of house music based in Los Angeles.

== Career ==
Abbate's DJ career began at the age of 14. At 16, he played at several well-known clubs and radio stations in Italy. He was regularly featured on Italian radio station, Kiss Kiss FM. Prior to moving to Los Angeles, Abbate spent several years in London performing at well-known clubs such as Ministry of Sound, The Egg, Fabric and Heaven. His collaborative single with Luciana titled "One By One" was released via Young & Vicious on 16 March 2015.

Abbate has three songs charted on the Billboard charts; "One By One", a collaboration with Luciana, "Shake Ur Bumpa", a collaboration with Cristian Poow, and "Watch Out", a collaboration with Gary Caos. "Watch Out" was remixed by several producers including Rick Cross, Moodyboy and NerveStrain. "Shake Ur Bumpa" got remixed by Gus Bonani, Lambert & Handle, The Perry Twins plus one extra rework by Cristian Poow himself. Abbate was announced as part of the "House Stars" event for the Miami Music Week 2017.

== Discography ==
=== Charted singles ===
Title	Year	Peak chart positions	
Title	Year	US Dance	US Club
"One By One" (with Luciana)	2015	33	5
"Shake Ur Bumpa" (with Cristian Poow)	2017	-	27
"Watch Out" (with Gary Caos)	2017	47	7
