= Obsesii =

Romanian song

Single by Alexandra Stan

from the album Rainbows (Note: "Obsesii" appears on the standard version of Rainbows as a bonus track.)
- Released: 31 January 2020
- Length: 3:34
- Label: Universal
- Songwriters: Alex Pelin; Vlad Lucan
- Producers: Radu Bolfea; Lucan

Alexandra Stan singles chronology
"I Think I Love It" (2019)	"Obsesii" (2020)	"Definii" (2020)

Music video
- "Obsesii" on YouTube

"Obsesii" (English: "Obsessions") is a song recorded by Romanian singer Alexandra Stan, released as a single by Universal Music Romania for digital download on 31 January 2020. A Romanian language track, it was written by Alex Pelin and Vlan Lucan, while the latter handled the production alongside Radu Bolfea. Lyrically, "Obsesii" discusses a love which has turned into obsession. Music critics particularly praised the song's lyrics, as well as Stan's vocal delivery. An accompanying music video was uploaded to her YouTube channel on 2 February 2020. Directed by Bogdan Daragiu, the black and white clip depicts Stan and several dancers wearing loose shirts to symbolize freedom. To further promote "Obsesii", the singer performed the track on Romanian talk shows and radio stations. Commercially, it reached number 12 on the local Airplay 100 chart. The song is the second single from her fifth album Rainbows.

== Background, composition and reception ==
"Obsesii" was written by Alex Pelin and Vlad Lucan, while the latter solely handled the mixing and mastering process. Lucan produced the track alongside Radu Bolfea. With a length of three minutes and 34 seconds, "Obsesii" was released as a single by Universal Music Romania for digital download in various countries on 31 January 2020. Lyrically, the Romanian language song talks about a love turned into obsession. Using several metaphors throughout, the lyrics also describe Stan's carnal desires as "fake illusions". The song was produced with the use of an "urban" sample.

Upon release, "Obsesii" received positive reviews from music critics. Mihai Burlacu of Pro TV lauded the song's lyrics, describing them as "poetry" and praising the use of metaphors. He further wrote that the track's vibe "seems to lead you into a personal universe, which relies on images created by the imagination". Similarly, Jonathan Currinn of CelebMix praised the writing, and noted an "intellectual vibe". He also lauded Stan's vocal delivery and deemed "Obsesii" as "unforgettable". Commercially, the song entered the local Airplay 100 chart for the week ending 8 March 2020 at number 75, and has since risen to number 12 on 14 June.

== Music video and promotion ==
Directed by Bogdan Daragiu, an accompanying music video for "Obsesii" was uploaded to Stan's YouTube channel on 2 February 2020 around 20:00 (EET). Shot in black and white, the clip depicts Stan as an "angelic figure, surrounded by silent dancers trapped in [their] movements". They wear loose shirts to symbolize freedom. Other scenes show a lake, rain, fluctuating lights and Stan lying on the back of a horse. The music video was generally praised by reviewers. Burlacu of Pro TV wrote that its images build a "magnetic universe", and InfoMusic's Stănescu similarly noted "magical and mesmerizing visuals". An editor of Aficia called the clip "sober, intimate and sensual". Currinn of CelebMix slightly criticized the use of choreography throughout the video. To further promote "Obsesii", Stan performed the track on Romanian talk shows Vorbește lumea and La Măruță in early February 2020. Furthermore, she sang the song on Kiss FM later that month.

== Credits and personnel ==
Credits adapted from Tidal.

- Radu Bolfea – producer
- Vlad Lucan – composer, lyricist, mixing, mastering, producer
- Alex Pelin – composer, lyricist
- Alexandra Stan – lead vocals

== Track listing ==
- Digital download
1. "Obsesii" – 3:34
- Digital downloads (Remixes EP)
1. "Obsesii" (Acoustic Version) – 3:43
2. "Obsesii" (Nomad Digital Remix) – 3:40
3. "Obsesii" (Village Remix) – 4:14
4. "Obsesii" (Albwho Remix) – 4:29
5. "Obsesii" – 3:34

== Charts ==
Chart (2020)	Peak position
Romania (Airplay 100)	14
Romania (Romanian Radio Airplay)	12
Romania (Romania TV Airplay)	11

=== Year-end charts ===
Chart (2020)	Position
Romania (Airplay 100)	46

== Release history ==
Country	Date	Format(s)	Label	Ref.
Various	31 January 2020	Digital download	Universal	
