= Deepcentral =

Romanian pop music duo

DeepCentral
- Origin: Bucharest, Romania
- Genres: Electro, house, pop
- Years active: 2009-present
- Label: Universal Music Romania
- Members: George Călin (DJ); Doru Todoruț (vocalist)
- Website: www.deepcentral.ro

Deepcentral is a Romanian pop duo with house music influences formed in 2009 by Romanian DJ George Călin (now known as Manuel Riva) and vocalist Doru Todoruț.

Călin, the DJ of the duo had begun his musical career with the band Demmo, that also included Anamaria Ferentz and Vik. Demmo they released four albums: Pentru inima ta, Trei, Ding Dang Dong and Cântecul meu. The band lasted from 2001 to 2006.

Deepcentral released their self-titled debut album Deepcentral of mainly dance house music on 3 June 2009 on Universal Music Romania with "Cry It Away" being their first charting single.

Deepcentral stylized at times as DeepCentral had the biggest Romanian hit of 2010 with "In Love". The single was as the top of the year-end list of Romanian hits, after having spent 7 weeks at the top of the Romanian Top 100 in the period March to May that year, with a total of 17 weeks in the Top 10. As a result, Deepcentral was nominated to MTV Europe Music Award for Best Romanian Act as one of 5 possible acts to win the title in 2010. But the title eventually went to Romanian singer Inna. The band was also featured in Xonia's hit "My Beautiful One". The single stayed 64 weeks in the Romanian Top 100.

George Călin the DJ of the duo has gone on to music producing under the name Manuel Riva with "Miami" becoming an international hit for him in a song featuring Alexandra Stan.

== Discography ==
=== Albums ===
Year	Album and details	Notes
2009	Deepcentral: Date released: 3 August 2009; Format: Digital album; Record label: Universal Music Romania	Track list: 1. "Undercover" (4:18); 2. "Lost In You" (3:48); 3. "Cry It Away" (3:25); 4. "Is It Real" (4:50); 5. "Play Again" (4:15); 6. "High" (feat. Miss DJ Vika Jigulina) (3:59); 7. "I Can't Live Without You" (3:36); 8. "Russian Girl" (4:07); 9. "A Lot Of You" (4:00); 10. "Tell Me" (4:30); 11. "In & Out" (5:10); 12. "Cry It Away" (Liquid Remix) (5:36); 13. "Russian Girl" (Summer Mix) (3:36)
2013	O Stea: Date released: 3 June 2013; Format: Digital album, CD; Record label: Universal Music Romania	Track list: 1. "Raindrops" (feat. Elefteria) (3:42); 2. "In Love" (3:45); 3. "Cocaine" (3:54); 4. "O stea" (3:47); 5. "Speed Of Sound" (4:04); 6. "So Divine" (3:47); 7. "Music Makes Me Free" (3:35); 8. "Back To Life" (3:59); 9. "În urma ta" (Sistem vs. Deepcentral) (3:42); 10. "My Way" (feat. Ivan Martin & Tom Chaos) (3:53); 11. "O stea" (Killing Time Remix) (4:17); 12. "Music Makes Me Free" (RLS Remix)(2:56); 13. "Shooting Star" (3:47); 14. "I F***ed Up" (Sistem vs. Deepcentral) (3:40)

=== Singles ===
Year	Single	Peak position		Album
Year	Single	RO	RU	Album
2009	"Russian Girl"	10	35	Deepcentral
2009	"Cry It Away"	—	—	Deepcentral
2010	"In Love"	1	65	O stea
2010	"Music Makes Me Free"	3	—	O stea
2011	"Speed of Sound"	8	—	O stea
2012	"So Divine"	58	—	O stea
2012	"O stea"	35	—	O stea
2013	"Sus Pana La Cer"	—	—	non-album singles
2014	"dragosteaînvinge" / "Troublemaker"	—	—	non-album singles
2014	"Hey Girl (Dreaming of Moscow)"	—	—	non-album singles
2015	"Noapte Albă"	—	—	non-album singles
