= Gabriel Huiban =

Liviu Gabriel Huiban
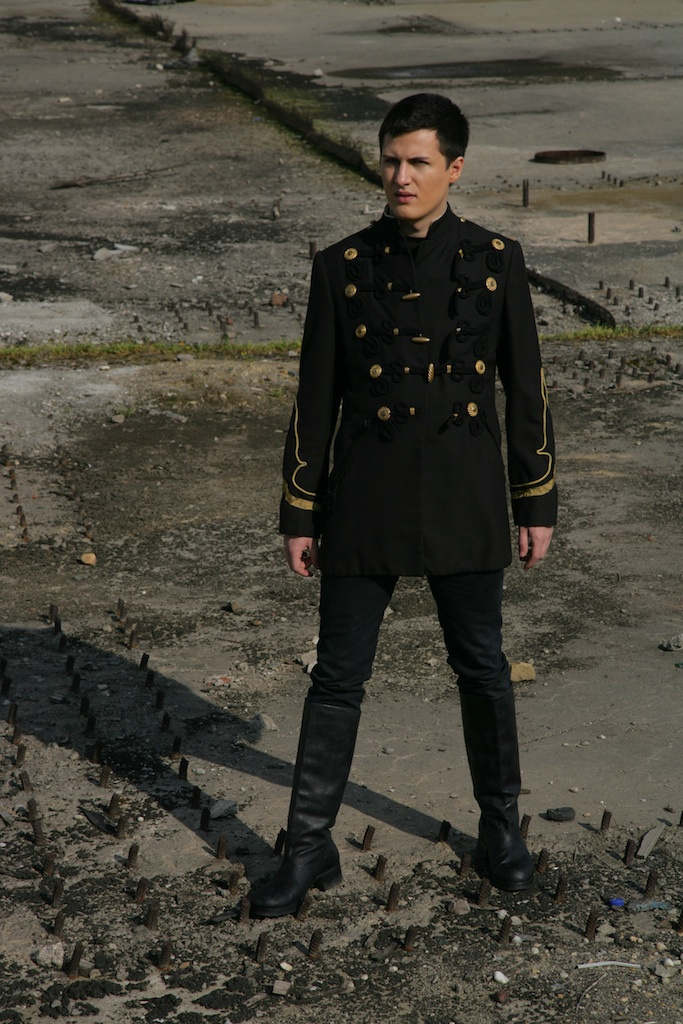
- Gabriel Huiban

Background information
- Origin: Bârlad, Vaslui County, Romania
- Genres: Pop, rock, R&B, dance
- Occupations: Record producer, songwriter, singer, musician
- Instruments: Keyboard, guitar
- Years active: 1998-present
- Label: Gala
- Website: www.gabrielhuiban.ro

Liviu Gabriel Huiban is a Romanian songwriter, keyboardist, arranger, and composer of numerous scores for the advertising industry, radio, television and motion pictures.

== Career ==
In 20 years of activity, he had been writing for more than 60 artists, renowned or beginners, assembling a 400 song portfolio from which 50 reached Top 15 charts.

He established an enduring collaboration in Romania with the music band DJ Project. They began working together in 2005 and released 10 hit-singles that reached Top 5 and 6 of them make it to No. 1 on the charts.

Huiban has worked with artists such as Akcent, Andreea Banica, Giulia, Heaven, Markus Schulz, Dan Balan (Crazy Loop) Alexandra Stan, Elena Gheorghe, CRBL, Delia, Petra, Randi, Dan Balan, Holograf, Vunk Anna Lesko and many more.
