= Vanilla Chocolat =

2014 single by Alexandra Stan

Single by Alexandra Stan featuring Connect-R

from the album Unlocked
- Released: 24 December 2014
- Recorded: 2014
- Studio: Fonogram (Bucharest, Romania)
- Genre: Dance-pop
- Length: 3:18
- Label: Fonogram; Blanco y Negro; Yeni Dünya; Magic
- Songwriters: Sava Constantin; Alexandru Cotoi; Stefan Mihalache; Mika Moupondo; Alexandra Stan
- Producer: Alexandru Cotoi

Alexandra Stan singles chronology
"Give Me Your Everything" (2014)	"Vanilla Chocolat" (2014)	"We Wanna" (2015)

Connect-R singles chronology
"Tren de Noapte" (2014)	"Vanilla Chocolat" (2014)	"Rece ca Decembrie" (2014)

Music video
- "Vanilla Chocolat" on YouTube

"Vanilla Chocolat" is a song recorded by Romanian singer Alexandra Stan for her second studio album, Unlocked (2014). It features guest vocals provided by Romanian rapper Connect-R. The track was made available for digital download on 24 December 2014 as the album's fifth single. "Vanilla Chocolat" was written by Stan, Connect-R, Sava Constantin, Alexandru Cotoi and Mika Moupondo, while production was handled by Cotoi. A selfie music video for the song was directed by Stan and The Architect, and debuted on Stan's YouTube channel on 18 December 2014. After its release, music critics praised "Vanilla Chocolat" for Connect-R's "catchy rap" and French bits, while others pointed out the "easy-to-sing", but at the same time "nonsense" lyrics of the track. The song was performed during Stan's "Unlocked Tour" (2014), and together with "Cherry Pop" on Romanian show Vocea României.

== Background and recording ==
"Vanilla Chocolat"
A 26-second sample of the song, showcasing the refrain of the track which was compared to Bollywood music by critics.

"Vanilla Chocolat" was written by Stan, Sava Constantin, Alexandru Cotoi, Stefan Mihalache and Mika Moupondo, while production was handled by Cotoi. The track was recorded at Fonogram Studios in Bucharest, Romania, and features lyrics written in both English and French. "Vanilla Chocolat" was composed during the song-writing Fonocamp-camp in Azuga, Romania, where the singer worked on new songs along with fellow Romanian and international artists. Particularly, Stan felt that she was very "pleased with the collaboration, because [she] really wanted to work with Romanian artists, not just with Romanian producers like on [her] second studio album." She talked about the choosing of Connect-R as the guest vocalist for "Vanilla Chocolat":

"I chose Connect-R because it seems that he can "deal" with every music genre, because he is flexible and he can continue even with every unexpected change or sound combination. Connect-R can also sing in every language without any problems, because he believes in his own work. We met at the Fonogram Studios, and we started 'half seriously and jokingly' to work on the song, along with Alex Cotoi. The result is 'sweet and fragrant'.

== Critical reception ==
The recording received generally positive reviews from music critics upon release. Pop Shock reviewed Stan's second studio album, Unlocked, in late 2014, where they commended that "Vanilla Chocolat" was one of the best songs of the album. They felt that "everything about this track is pure pop perfection – from the playful French bits, to the Bollywood-inspired chorus. It also sounds completely different to everything else in the charts right now." Pop Shock were initially disappointed by the video being "Selfie cam", but they went on to say that "it holds up to multiple viewings and suits the joyous nature of the song". German website Hitfire reported the video premiere of "Vanilla Chocolat" on 1 January 2015, where they praised the catchy dance-pop beat incorporated in the refrain of the song and its "easy-to-sing", but at the same time "nonsense" lyrics". They concluded, "It's very unlikely to become a worldwide hit, because it is too mediocre."

== Music video ==
I thought that it would be very nice to film a selfie video for our song. I thought to make a video in which my fans could find myself in very natural, but at the same time in artistic poses. They couldn't discover me in the bath or going shopping, but going to shows and interacting with journalists and radio people. It is a burst of energy.

—Stan talking about the selfie video for "Vanilla Chocolat".

Stan performing at "Neata cu Razvan si Dani" in the selfie video for "Vanilla Chocolat"

A selfie video, which also served as the official video for "Vanilla Chocolat", premiered on 18 December 2014 on Alexandra Stan's official YouTube channel. It was directed by Stan during one single week. She filmed herself on different TV shows, where she was invited to perform the track, including "Neata cu Razvan si Dani" and "La Maruță". Stan additionally directed at the Fonogram Studios, Roton Studios, the rehearsal room of Emil Rengle and her own house, describing the video as being "full of energy" for featuring many public figures such as Mihai Morar, Răzvan și Dani or Adelina Pestrițu. Few scenes of the video were not filmed by the singer alone, for which The Architect served as the cameraman. Particularly, Dinu and Deea Maxer compared the selfie video for "Vanilla Chocolat" with their clip for "Selfie en Paris".

== Live performances ==
Stan's first live performance of "Vanilla Chocolat" was on 1 December 2014 on Neatza cu Razvan si Dani, which was followed by her lip-synced performance of the song on Wowbiz, to film some scenes for the single's accompanying selfie video. Following the release of the clip, Stan performed a stripped-down version of "Vanilla Chocolat" on the Romanian radio station Pro FM on 2 December 2014, where she also sang Romania's national anthem backed with instruments played by Andrei Gheorghe, Greeg (Grigore Șerban) and Alexandru Cotoi. Stan was subsequently invited to perform on the Romanian version of The Voice on 12 December 2014. There, she lip-synced both "Cherry Pop" and "Vanilla Chocolat". Shortly after her act, juror Tudor Chirila expressed how he was very "disappointed" of Stan's appearance, as she didn't provide live vocals. In an interview with Cancan, Stan confessed that "[her] conditions of appearance on Vocea României were already discussed with the show's producers, so no one should have been surprised about [her] playback-performance".

== Credits and personnel ==
Credits adapted from the liner notes of Unlocked and The Collection

Recording

- Recorded at Fonogram Studios in Bucharest, Romania.
- Produced for Fonogram Music Productions in Bucharest, Romania.

Technical and songwriting credits

- Alexandra Stan – songwriting
- Stefan Mihalache – songwriting
- Alexandru Cotoi – songwriting, producing
- Sava Constantin – songwriting
- Mika Moupondo – songwriting

Visual credits

- The Architect – cameraman
- Emil Rengle – choreography
- Alexandra Stan – camera

Vocal credits

- Alexandra Stan – lead vocals
- Connect-R – featured artist

== Track listings ==
- Spanish digital remix EP
1. "Vanilla Chocolat" (DJ Valdi Remix) – 3:22
2. "Vanilla Chocolat" (DJ Valdi Remix Edit) – 4:20
3. "Vanilla Chocolat" (CryDuom Remix) – 3:06
4. "Vanilla Chocolat" (CryDuom Remix Edit) – 3:52
- Japanese digital download
1. "Vanilla Chocolat" (feat. Connect-R) – 3:18
- Spanish / Turkish / Polish digital download
1. "Vanilla Chocolat" (feat. Connect-R) – 3:17

== Release history ==
Country	Date	Format	Label
Japan	24 December 2014	Digital single	Fonogram
Spain	24 February 2015	Digital single	Blanco y Negro
Spain	22 May 2015	Digital remix EP	Blanco y Negro
Turkey	6 April 2015	Digital single	Yeni Dünya
Poland	19 May 2015	Digital single	Magic
