= Miami (Manuel Riva song) =

Single by Manuel Riva featuring Alexandra Stan
- Released: 6 March 2018
- Length: 3:31
- Label: Roton; Forward Music Agency
- Songwriters: George Emanuel Călin; Cristian Sorin Ochiu
- Producer: George Emanuel Călin

Manuel Riva singles chronology
"The Wall" (2017)	"Miami" (2018)	"Machines" (2018)

Alexandra Stan singles chronology
"Noi doi" (2017)	"Miami" (2018)	"Mami" (2018)

"Miami" is a song recorded by Romanian producer and disc jockey Manuel Riva featuring guest vocals from Romanian singer Alexandra Stan. It released on 6 March 2018 by Roton and Forward Music Agency. Riva produced the song, and wrote it with Cristian Sorin Ochiu. He worked on the track during the songwriting camp Tabăra Internaţională de Muzică TIC (International Music Camp TIC) held in Romania in 2017. A Latin-inspired track, "Miami" lyrically talks about freedom and emotional expression.

A music critic from CelebMix gave a positive review of the song, praising the lyrics, production and Stan's vocal delivery. Commercially, "Miami" experienced moderate success on record charts, reaching the top ten on the Romanian Airplay 100, in Bulgaria, and on Billboard's Dance Club Songs component chart, as well as number 44 on the Hot Dance/Electronic Songs ranking also compiled by the same publication. It was aided by a music video released onto Roton's official YouTube channel on 16 March 2018. Shot by Bogdan Păun in the United States, it shows two male and female characters dancing and interacting with a masked man. "Miami" was used as the anthem for the 2018 Neversea Festival.

== Background and release ==
Manuel Riva wrote "Miami" in 2016, while further work was done during the songwriting camp Tabăra Internaţională de Muzică TIC (International Music Camp TIC) held in Romania one year later. Cristian Sorin Ochiu is credited as a co-writer, while Riva also handled the production. The track features guest vocals from Alexandra Stan, who was played the song in the summer of 2017. Riva elaborated on its title in an interview with Nexus Radio: "If you listen to the lyrics, it’s not about Miami as a city but about freedom; it's about some place that gives you a certain vibe. The whole concept behind tries to bring that up… people will get the feeling that is about them". On another occasion, Riva further stated regarding the song's message:

"'Mami' talks about the vibe you have when you think of this city. It is about liberation and expression without language, ethnic, religious or sexual barriers. I think people simply are and exist, and the labels do nothing but limit us. Generally, I like to live now, [...] I do not want to project myself [...] at a time in the future, because it would mean no longer to enjoy the things that are happening now."

"Miami"
A 25-second sample of "Miami", a "laid-back" and Latin-inspired song featuring the vocals of Alexandra Stan.

During the lyrics, Stan alludes to a beach in Miami. Musically, the song has been described as "laid-back" and Latin-inspired by music critics. A writer of PRWeb stated: "[The track] showcases Riva’s diverse musical style – one that avoids the familiar, and breaks down barriers between genres." "Miami" was digitally released on 6 March 2018 in multiple European countries by both Roton and Forward Music Agency, featuring an extended version on its B-side. It debuted on Romanian radio stations on 22 March 2018. The song was made available in the United States on 16 March 2018 through Radikal Records; the same label distributed a ten-track digital remixes extended play (EP) the following month. After "Miami" has been selected as the anthem for the 2018 Neversea Festival, another version of the song titled "Neversea" with altered lyrics was premiered along with a music video.

== Reception ==
Jonathan Currinn, a music critic writing for CelebMix, praised the song as "epic", as well as applauded Stan's vocal delivery, the production and the lyrics. Commercially, "Miami" experienced moderate success on record charts. On the native Airplay 100, it reached number eight in July 2018. The song climbed again to its peak position in September 2018. In May, "Miami" entered Billboard's Dance Club Songs chart at number 50, making it Riva's second overall appearance after his "Mhm Mhm" charted in 2016. It also serves as Stan's second entry after "Mr. Saxobeat" reached number 37 in 2011. "Miami" has since reached number ten in the ranking. The song further peaked at number 44 on Billboard's fellow Hot Dance/Electronic Songs chart, and at number five in Bulgaria.

== Music video ==
An accompanying music video for "Miami" was uploaded onto Roton's official YouTube channel on 16 March 2018. It was sent to native television stations on the same date. The clip was shot by NGM Creative's Bogdan Păun in the United States in 2017. Alexandru Mureșan was hired as the director of photography. The video begins with Stan posing against the sunrise on a beach, wearing a flattering golden robe. Following this, a man walks through a desert sporting a yellow costume and a silver mask, accompanied by two male and female characters "spreading their love for each other and for what they call home". They perform subtle choreography and later lie on the ground to hold hands. According to a Currinn of CelebMix, the characters "seem to be puppets to [the aforementioned] masked man, who we presume is Manuel Riva", with them also marching while carrying flags displaying Riva's logo. Scenes interspersed during the visual's main plot show Stan performing to the song wearing white and black costumes. Currinn gave a mixed review of the music video, stating that it "doesn’t quite meet [his] expectations". He further pointed out the dancers' subtle movements "as if they're in a trance-like state, in line with the gentle lyrics rather than the upbeat track". Currinn praised Stan's appearance and her outfits.

== Track listing ==
- Digital download
1. "Miami" (feat. Alexandra Stan) [Radio Edit] − 3:31
2. "Miami" (feat. Alexandra Stan) [Extended Version] − 5:36
- Digital remixes EP
1. "Miami" (feat. Alexandra Stan) [Riva's Private Remix] – 5:50
2. "Miami" (feat. Alexandra Stan) [Adrian Funk X OLiX Remix] – 3:02
3. "Miami" (feat. Alexandra Stan) [MoonSound Radio Edit] – 3:41
4. "Miami" (feat. Alexandra Stan) [Hauz Brothers Radio Edit] – 3:42
5. "Miami" (feat. Alexandra Stan) [Gabriel M Remix] – 5:08
6. "Miami" (feat. Alexandra Stan) [Cristian Poow Radio Mix] – 3:36
7. "Miami" (feat. Alexandra Stan) [Adrian Funk X OLiX Remix Extended] – 4:02
8. "Miami" (feat. Alexandra Stan) [MoonSound Remix] – 5:10
9. "Miami" (feat. Alexandra Stan) [Hauz Brothers Remix] – 4:50
10. "Miami" (feat. Alexandra Stan) [Cristian Poow Club Mix] – 5:15

== Credits and personnel ==
Credits adapted from the official music video.

Technical and songwriting credits

- Alexandra Stan – lead vocals
- George Emanuel Călin – composer, producer
- Cristian Sorin Ochiu – composer

Visual credits

- Bogdan Păun – director
- Alexandru Mureșan – director of photography

== Charts ==
=== Weekly charts ===
Weekly chart performance for "Miami"
Chart (2018)	Peak position
Bulgaria (PROPHON)	5
Romania (Airplay 100)	8
Romania Airplay (Media Forest)	5
Romania TV Airplay (Media Forest)	9
US Dance Club Songs (Billboard)	10
US Hot Dance/Electronic Songs (Billboard)	44

=== Year-end charts ===
Year-end chart performance for "Miami"
Chart (2018)	Position
Romania (Airplay 100)	21

== Release history ==
Release history and formats for "Miami"
Territory	Date	Format(s)	Label
Romania	6 March 2018	Digital download	Roton/ Forward Music Agency
Italy	6 March 2018	Digital download	Roton/ Forward Music Agency
Spain	6 March 2018	Digital download	Roton/ Forward Music Agency
United Kingdom	6 March 2018	Digital download	Roton/ Forward Music Agency
United States	16 March 2018	Digital download	Radikal

== See also ==
- List of music released by Romanian artists that has charted in major music markets
