= Mami (song) =

Single by Alexandra Stan

from the album Mami
- Released: 4 April 2018
- Length: 3:32
- Label: Alexandra Stan
- Songwriter(s): Alexandra Stan; Katie DiCicco
- Producer(s): Simon Says

Alexandra Stan singles chronology
"Miami" (2018)	"Mami" (2018)	"I Think I Love It" (2019)

"Mami" is a song recorded by Romanian singer Alexandra Stan for her fourth studio album of the same name (2018), independently released as its third single on 4 April 2018. It was written by Stan and Katie DiCicco, while production was handled by DiCicco and Simon Says. A trilingual recording, "Mami" explores femininity. An accompanying music video was filmed by Bogdan Păun of NGM Creative and was uploaded onto Stan's official YouTube channel on 14 February 2018. Inspired by Mexican culture, it portrays the machismo idealism of a Latina girl next door daydreaming of her love interest.

== Background and lyrics ==
"Mami" was written by Alexandra Stan and Katie DiCicco, while production was handled by DiCicco and Los Angeles-based record producer Simon Says. Serge Courtois was credited for mixing and mastering the track. It was independently released as the third single from her fourth studio album of the same name (2018) on 4 April 2018 in Japan. The song was written mostly in English, though a few lyrics are in French (C'est incroyable/C'est impossible) and Spanish. During the refrain, Stan repeats: "I love it when you call me Mami/I love it when you call me Mami/I love it when you call me Mami/'Cause you shake me like a Tsunami", insinuating her desire to be viewed as a "mami". Valentin Malfroy of French website Aficia found the singer's vocals to be sensualized. Regarding the song's message, the singer said: "I am "Mami", I'm loving, I feel like the mother of all boys looking for attention and love, I feel fulfilled and happy with my femininity." During a Q&A session on her website, Stan dedicated "Mami" to "all the amazing women who are strong and powerful, who don't forget to love themselves and to love the others[, and to] all the men who respect women in general [...]."

== Music video ==
Well, when I say "Mami", my first thought is about a Latin woman. I wanted something colorful, caliente and I have to be honest that I really like Mexican food.

—Stan talking about choosing Mexico as an inspiration for the music video.

An accompanying music video for the song was uploaded onto Stan's official YouTube channel on 14 February 2018. It was filmed by Bogdan Păun from NGM Creative in Romania, while Alexandru Mureșan acted as the director of photography. Ovidiu Buță, Ely Adam, Alexandra Craescu and Claudiu Alex Sarghe were additionally hired for styling, assistance, make-up and hair styling, respectively. Stan's hair styling was inspired by her mother's youth.

An editor of Antena 1 wrote that Stan portrays a "lovely and sensual" Latina cooking in the kitchen. The singer is then seen daydreaming of her "papi". The publication also pointed out the video's "color, sensual movements and [its] Latin atmosphere." Jonathan Currinn of CelebMix pointed out elements of comedy in the video, writing: "Stan's mind wanders as she cooks food, imagining her lover appearing in the kitchen. Together, they knock out some dance moves and some provocative sexual scenes that become comedic when her mind drifts back to reality." Stan described the music video as being inspired by Mexican culture, having coming up with the idea with her crew. She further explained that she wanted to showcase her love for cooking, as well as her desire to portray a girl next door. Malfroy of Aficia wrote that Stan played a femme fatale. Prior to the release of the visual, Stan received backlash from her fans for gaining weight and allegedly having breast implants.

== Track listing ==
- Digital download
1. "Mami" – 3:32

== Credits and personnel ==
Credits adapted from Antena 1.

Technical and composing credits

- Alexandra Stan – lead vocals, composer
- Katie DiCicco – composer
- Serge Courtois – mixing and mastering
- Simon Says – producer

Visual credits

- Bogdan Păun – director
- Alexandru Mureșan – director of photography
- Ovidiu Buță – styling
- Ely Adam – assistant
- Alexandra Crăescu – make-up
- Claudiu Alex Sarghe – hair styling

== Release history ==
Territory	Date	Format(s)	Label
Japan	4 April 2018	Digital download	Alexandra Stan
Italy	15 June 2018	Digital download; radio airplay	CDF
