= Shake Ur Bumpa =

Single by Cristian Poow and Glovibes
- Released: 27 January 2017
- Genre: Tech house
- Length: 6:51
- Label: Bonanza Records; Dbeatzion Records
- Composer(s): Cristian Poow; GloVibes
- Lyricist(s): Cristian Poow

Cristian Poow singles chronology
"Rhythm Is A Dancer (New Remix Series 1)" (2016)	"Shake Ur Bumpa" (2017)	"I Want So Bad" (2017)

GloVibes singles chronology
"Shake Ur Bumpa" (2017)

"Shake Ur Bumpa" is a dance music song by Argentinian DJ and music producer Cristian Poow and Italian DJ Glovibes. The song peaked at 27th on the US Dance Club Songs chart.

== Background ==
This is the very first dance music song to ever get into the Billboard Charts made by an Argentinian music producer. Cristian said to Billboard, "Being an Argentinian breaking on Billboard is more than an achievement." He was intensely excited to have a song charted on the Billboard chart and for the very first time after working for so many #1 artists on the remix duties (i.e. Katy Perry, StoneBridge, Jonas Blue). The song has been actively topping the Billboard charts for several weeks, giving Cristian a new step forward on the US club scene, with major achievements like officially being hired by StoneBridge for the 2016 revisit of his classic "Put 'em High" and later on being listed as one of the biggest music producers in Argentina at that moment, always producing different styles (house, deep house, progressive house, circuit/tribal house).

== Track listing ==
- Digital download – Bonanza Records
1. "Shake Ur Bumpa" [Original Mix] − 6:51
- Digital remixes EP – Dbeatzion Records
1. "Shake Ur Bumpa" [Gus Bonani Remix] – 7:30
2. "Shake Ur Bumpa" [Lambert & Handle Remix] – 5:15
3. "Shake Ur Bumpa" [The Perry Twins Remix] – 5:42
4. "Shake Ur Bumpa" [Cristian Poow's More Shake Mix] – 6:41

== Charts ==
Chart (2017)	Peak position
US Dance Club Songs (Billboard)	27
