= Lariss =

Romanian pop singer-songwriter

Larisa Petronela Borza (born 31 December 1989), known professionally as Lariss, is a Romanian pop singer-songwriter. She rose to prominence following the release of her 2014 debut single "Dale Papi", which achieved commercial success in Eastern Europe and the Mediterranean region. Her musical style fuses Latin, electronic, and urban contemporary sounds.

== Early life ==
Borza was born in Iași, Romania. She began studying violin at the age of seven at the National Art College “Octav Bancila”. She recalls organizing amateur concerts for her friends and neighbours at a young age. In fifth grade, she started taking piano lessons and joined a vocal choir.

As a Romanian Orthodox Christian, religious music also formed a central part of her early development, and Lariss frequently performed Byzantine and choral music for the Romanian Church. She also competed in singing competitions in Italy, Holland, Belgium, and Austria.

In 2013, Lariss graduated from the National University of Music Bucharest, Romania.

== Career ==
On 24 November 2014, Lariss released her debut single "Dale Papi", produced by Sergiu Musteata and co-written with David Ciente and Shift. A music video was published a few days later. The song reached #2 on the Bulgarian charts, secured a Top 5 position on the Romanian Music Charts, and achieving commercial success in countries such as Turkey, Greece, and Cyprus.

"Dale Papi" was rated Romania's "Favourite Song" in the Shazam Top Songs chart. As of August 2026, the song's music video has nearly 100 million views on the video-sharing platform YouTube. Skope Magazine attributed the single's viral success to the "sultry" music video that accompanies it.

In 2015, Lariss won the "Best New Artist" category at the Media Music Awards.

During 2015 and 2016, she performed in European cities like Monaco, Paris, and Chisinau and appeared at music festivals in Turkey and Greece. She is listed as a producer for Romanian pop singer Antonia's 2015 single "Chica Loco".

In 2016, Lariss joined the girl supergroup G Girls, replacing Alexandra Stan in the original lineup alongside Inna, Antonia, and Lori. Shortly after she joined the group, G Girls released the single, "Call the Police", which peaked at #6 on the Polish charts. In 2017, Lariss released a remix of "Dale Papi" for a United States audience, featuring American hip-hop artist K7.

In 2023, Romanian online business and financial news portal Money reported that she had launched a profile on adult subscription service, OnlyFans.

== Personal life ==
Borza resides in Bucharest. She maintains her childhood Christianity, remaining outspoken about her faith and referring to herself as a "warrior of God".
