= Dancing with the Stars (Albanian TV series) season 8 =

Dancing with the Stars
- Season 8
- Hosted by: Bora Zemani; Eno Popi
- Judges: Armand Peza; Dalina Buzi; Kledi Kadiu; Valbona Selimllari
- Celebrity winner: Sara Hoxha
- Professional winner: Luixhino Hala
- No. of episodes: 14

Release
- Original network: Top Channel
- Original release: 7 October 2022 – 1 January 2023

Season chronology
- Next → Season 9

The eighth season of Dancing with the Stars premiered on Top Channel on 7 October 2022, almost four years since it last aired on Vizion Plus. The host of this season was Bora Zemani, with Eno Popi joining as co-host.

In the judging panel were Armand Peza, Dalina Buzi, Kledi Kadiu and Valbona Selimllari.

The series was won by Sara Hoxha and her professional partner Luixhino Hala. The runners-up were Megi Pojani and Jurgen Bala.

== Host and judges ==
On 2 August 2022, a promo was published on social networks, thus showing that the eighth season of Dancing with the stars will start very soon and also after many hints it has been confirmed that the presenter of this season will be Bora Zemani, who also appears in the promo. On 30 September 2022, Eno Popi announced on the television show Wake Up, that he would be joining the show alongside Zemani as co-host.

On 2 September 2022, it was announced that the Italian dancer and actor Kledi Kadiu, will be the first judge. On 28 September 2022, Dalina Buzi announced on the television show Goca dhe Gra on Top Channel that she will be the second judge of the show. On 1 October 2022, Top Channel announced that Valbona Selimllari and Armand Peza were the third and fourth judges.

== Couples ==
On 2 September 2022, the production of Dancing with the stars announced on their Instagram-account that the first celebrity participant will be Alban Nimani. Celebrity contestants continued to be revealed until 22 September 2022, when the full line-up was announced.

Celebrity	Notability	Professional partner	Status
Ilir Dushkaj	Cocktail master	Frenki Ziaj	Eliminated 1st on 14 October 2022
Alban Nimani	Singer	Odeta Dishnica	Eliminated 2nd on 21 October 2022
Irini Qirjako	Singer	Eltion Merja	Eliminated 3rd on 28 October 2022
Elona Duro	Journalist & radio presenter	Anxhelo Mucollari	Eliminated 4th on 4 November 2022
Gent Hazizi	Actor	Emanuela Omeri	Eliminated 5th on 11 November 2022
Debora Keci	Swimmer	Niko Spiro	Eliminated 6th on 18 November 2022
Arbër Çepani	Big Brother season 1 winner	Erisa Govaci; Silvester Shuta (week 9)	Eliminated 7th on 2 December 2022
Julia Gramo	Singer	Silvester Shuta; Jurgen Bala (weeks 9)	Eliminated 8th on 16 December 2022
Salsano Rrapi	Actor & Portokalli presenter	Lori Bala; Ledia Sulaj (week 9)	Eliminated 9th on 23 December 2022
Isli Islami	Journalist & television presenter	Ledia Sulaj; Jora Hodo (week 9)	Eliminated 10th on 23 December 2022
Ardit Cuni	Singer, dancer, actor & director	Jora Hodo; Erisa Govaci (week 9)	4th place on 1 January 2023
Elhaida Dani	Singer, songwriter & actress	Ledian Agallijaj; Luixhino Hala (week 9)	3rd place on 1 January 2023
Megi Pojani	Social media personality	Jurgen Bala; Lori Bala (week 9)	Runners-up on 1 January 2023
Sara Hoxha	Social media personality	Luixhino Hala; Ledian Agallijaj (week 9)	Winners on 1 January 2023

== Scoring chart ==
The highest score each week is indicated in bold green with a dagger (†), while the lowest score each week is indicated in italicized red with a double-dagger (‡).

Color key:

Winners
Runners-up
3rd place
4th place
Bottom two
Immune
Eliminated

Dancing with the Stars (season 8) - Weekly scores
Couple	Pl.	Week													
Couple	Pl.	1	2	1+2	3	4	5	6	7	8 (Note: The couples were scored on a 50-point scale due to the presence of a guest judge.)	9	10	11	12	13
Sara & Luixhino	1st	22	24	46	28	32	**37**†	26‡	30	48	34	38‡	36+38=74	34+34=68	40+38+40=**118**† (Note: This couple finished in first place.)
Megi & Jurgen	2nd	21	25	46	27	26	33+33=**66**†	26‡	36	39	**39**†	40	37+36=73 (Note: This couple had immunity.)	36+33=69	39+35+39=113‡ (Note: This couple finished in second place.)
Elhaida & Ledian	3rd	27	**32**†	**59**†	**32**†	28	**37**†	34	**40**†	**50**†	32	**44**†	26+40=66‡ (Note: This couple was in the bottom two, but was not eliminated.)	40+40=**80**†	40+38+40=**118**† (Note: This couple finished in third place.)
Ardit & Jora	4th	**28**†	21	49	**32**†	**37**†	**37**†	**38**†	34	**50**†	31	41	40+38=78	38+40=78	40+37+39=116 (Note: This couple finished in fourth place.)
Isli & Ledia	5th	21	**32**†	53	27	31	33+31=64	34	37	49	30	38‡	40+40=**80**†	32+34=66‡ (Note: This couple was eliminated.)	
Salsano & Lori	6th	19	27	46	**32**†	36	33+30=63	33	30	**50**†	30	41	40+34=74	36+30=66‡	
Julia & Silvester	7th	20	26	46	27	27	**37**†	32	30	39	27‡	38‡	37+31=68		
Arbër & Erisa	8th	24	24	48	**32**†	27	**37**†	29	35	34‡	31				
Debora & Niko	9th	26	22	48	27	22	33+30=63	33	26‡						
Gent & Emanuela	10th	19	16	35	24	20	**37**†	27							
Elona & Anxhelo	11th	18	19	37	25	23	33+23=56‡								
Irini & Eltion	12th	23	20	43	18	18‡									
Alban & Odeta	13th	17	16	33	9‡										
Ilir & Frenki	14th	16‡	15‡	31‡											

=== Average chart ===
This table only counts for dances scored on a traditional 40-points scale. Scores from guest judges are not included.

Couple	Rank by average	Total points	Number of dances	Total average
Ardit & Jora	1	602	17	35.4
Elhaida & Ledian	2	600	17	35.3
Sara & Luixhino	3	559	17	32.9
Isli & Ledia	4	490	15	32.7
Megi & Jurgen	5	581	18	32.3
Salsano & Lori	6	482	15	32.1
Julia & Silvester	7	352	12	29.3
Arbër & Erisa	8	254	9	28.2
Debora & Niko	9	219	8	27.4
Gent & Emanuela	10	143	6	23.8
Elona & Anxhelo	11	141	6	23.5
Irini & Eltion	12	79	4	19.8
Ilir & Frenki	13	31	2	15.5
Alban & Odeta	14	42	3	14.0

== Highest and lowest scoring performances of the series ==
The best and worst performances in each dance according to the judges' 40-point scale are as follows. Scores from guest judges are not included.

Dance	Celebrity	Highest score	Celebrity	Lowest score
Argentine tango	Megi Pojani	39	Ardit Cuni	38
Bachata	Elhaida Dani; Isli Islami	32	Ardit Cuni	21
Cha-Cha-Cha	Ardit Cuni; Sara Hoxha	40	Sara Hoxha	22
Charleston	Isli Islami	34	Ilir Dushkaj	15
Contemporary	Ardit Cuni; Isli Islami	40	Alban Nimani	16
Foxtrot	Ardit Cuni	38	Alban Nimani	17
Freestyle	Isli Islami	40	Elhaida Dani	26
Jive	Elhaida Dani	40	Debora Keci	26
Latin	Alban Nimani	9		
Paso Doble	Ardit Cuni	40	Gent Hazizi	20
Quickstep	Isli Islami	37	Julia Gramo	20
Rock and Roll	Julia Gramo	27	Ilir Dushkaj; Gent Hazizi	16
Rumba	Elhaida Dani	40	Julia Gramo	26
Salsa	Elhaida Dani	40	Irini Qirjako	18
Samba	Elhaida Dani	40	Elona Duro	19
Showdance	Elhaida Dani; Sara Hoxha	40	Ardit Cuni; Megi Pojani	39
Swing	Salsano Rrapi	33	Elona Duro	18
Tango	Ardit Cuni	38	Irini Qirjako	18
Viennese Waltz	Megi Pojani	26	Debora Keci	22
Waltz	Elhaida Dani; Salsano Rrapi	40	Irini Qirjako	20

== Couples' highest and lowest scoring dances ==
Scores are based upon a potential 40-point maximum. Scores from guest judges are not included.

Couples	Highest scoring dance	Lowest scoring dance
Sara & Luixhino	Cha-Cha-Cha; Dance-off (40)	Cha-Cha-Cha (22)
Megi & Jurgen	Argentine tango Samba; Dance-off (39)	Samba (21)
Elhaida & Ledian	Samba; Jive; Salsa; Waltz; Rumba; Dance-off (40)	Freestyle (26)
Ardit & Jora	Contemporary; Cha-Cha-Cha; Paso Doble (40)	Bachata (21)
Isli & Ledia	Freestyle; Contemporary (40)	Waltz (21)
Salsano & Lori	Waltz (40)	Salsa (19)
Julia & Silvester	Foxtrot (37)	Quickstep (20)
Arbër & Erisa	Paso Doble (35)	Tango; Quickstep (24)
Debora & Niko	Foxtrot (33)	Salsa; Viennese Waltz (22)
Gent & Emanuela	Waltz (27)	Rock and Roll (16)
Elona & Anxhelo	Foxtrot (25)	Slow Swing (18)
Irini & Eltion	Bachata (23)	Salsa; Tango (18)
Alban & Odeta	Foxtrot (17)	Latin (9)
Ilir & Frenki	Rock and Roll (16)	Charleston (15)

== Weekly scores and songs ==
Unless indicated otherwise, individual judges scores in the charts below (given in parentheses) are listed in this order from left to right: Dalina Buzi, Armand Peza, Kledi Kadiu, Valbona Selimllari.

=== Week 1: First Dances ===
There was no elimination this week; all scores carried over to the following week. Couples are listed in the order they performed.

Couple	Score	Dance	Music
Arbër & Erisa	24 (6, 5, 6, 7)	Tango	"Illusion of Us (Feel Project Remix)"—Dan Aslow & Lou Starry
Elona & Anxhelo	18 (5, 4, 4, 5)	Swing	"Cake by the Ocean"—DNCE
Sara & Luixhino	22 (6, 6, 5, 5)	Cha-Cha-Cha	"Let's Get Loud"—Jennifer Lopez
Gent & Emanuela	19 (4, 5, 5, 5)	Charleston	"La terza guerra mondiale"—Adriano Celentano
Isli & Ledia	21 (5, 6, 5, 5)	Waltz	"Nothing Else Matters"—Metallica
Debora & Niko	26 (6, 7, 6, 7)	Jive	"Candyman"—Christina Aguilera
Irini & Eltion	23 (7, 5, 6, 5)	Bachata	"Girls Like You"—Maroon 5 ft. Cardi B
Julia & Silvester	20 (5, 5, 5, 5)	Quickstep	"Walking on Sunshine"—Katrina and the Waves
Elhaida & Ledian	27 (6, 7, 7, 7)	Rumba	"Could I Have This Kiss Forever"—Whitney Houston & Enrique Iglesias
Ilir & Frenki	16 (4, 4, 4, 4)	Rock and Roll	"Jesus He Knows Me"—Genesis
Ardit & Jora	28 (6, 7, 7, 8)	Paso Doble	"You Take My Hand"—Tinlicker ft. Jamie Irrepressible
Alban & Odeta	17 (5, 4, 4, 4)	Foxtrot	"Can't Take My Eyes Off You"—Frankie Valli
Salsano & Lori	19 (4, 5, 5, 5)	Salsa	"Trendafil"—Dhurata Dora ft. Flori Mumajesi
Megi & Jurgen	21 (5, 5, 5, 6)	Samba	"Hips Don't Lie"—Shakira ft. Wyclef Jean

=== Week 2: First Elimination ===
Couples are listed in the order they performed.

Couple	Score	Dance	Music	Result
Salsano & Lori	27 (7, 7, 6, 7)	Jive	"Faith"—Stevie Wonder ft. Ariana Grande	Safe
Debora & Niko	22 (5, 5, 6, 6)	Salsa	"Vivir Mi Vida"—Marc Anthony	Safe
Ardit & Jora	21 (5, 5, 5, 6)	Bachata	"How Deep Is Your Love"—Calvin Harris & Disciples	Safe
Gent & Emanuela	16 (3, 4, 4, 5)	Rock and Roll	"Sajzeza"—Elita 5 & Adelina Ismaili	Bottom two
Ilir & Frenki	15 (3, 5, 3, 4)	Charleston	"Engjell Apo Djall"—Pirro Cako	Eliminated
Elhaida & Ledian	32 (8, 8, 8, 8)	Paso Doble	"Viva la Vida"—Coldplay	Safe
Alban & Odeta	16 (4, 4, 3, 5)	Contemporary	"In Your Room"—Depeche Mode	Safe
Arbër & Erisa	24 (5, 6, 6, 7)	Quickstep	"Hit Me Up"—Gia Farrell	Safe
Irini & Eltion	20 (5, 4, 5, 6)	Waltz	"Une dhe ti"—Alban Skënderaj	Safe
Isli & Ledia	32 (8, 8, 8, 8)	Cha-Cha-Cha	"Blurred Lines"—Robin Thicke ft. T.I. & Pharrell Williams	Safe
Megi & Jurgen	25 (7, 6, 6, 6)	Tango	"La Fama"—Rosalía ft. The Weeknd	Safe
Julia & Silvester	26 (6, 7, 6, 7)	Rumba	"Let You Love Me"—Rita Ora	Safe
Sara & Luixhino	24 (5, 6, 5, 8)	Foxtrot	"I'm Not the Only One"—Sam Smith	Safe
Elona & Anxhelo	19 (4, 5, 4, 6)	Samba	"Şımarık"—Tarkan	Safe

=== Week 3: Top Fest Night ===
Musical guest: Besa Kokëdhima—"Engjejt Vrasin Njelloj"/"Unik"/"Fishekzjarre"

Couples are listed in the order they performed.

Couple	Score	Dance	Music	Result
Isli & Ledia	27 (6, 7, 6, 8)	Rumba	"Si Trëndafil"—Poni	Safe
Julia & Silvester	27 (7, 7, 6, 7)	Jive	"Edhe Nje Here"—Xhensila Myrtezaj	Safe
Megi & Jurgen	27 (7, 7, 6, 7)	Salsa	"Vetem ti je"—Noizy ft. Elgit Doda	Safe
Sara & Luixhino	28 (7, 7, 6, 8)	Tango	"Shko"—Ledri Vula & Ermal Fejzullahu & Lumi B	Safe
Irini & Eltion	18 (5, 4, 4, 5)	Salsa	"Lady lady"—Stine & Abi	Bottom two
Elona & Anxhelo	25 (5, 7, 6, 7)	Foxtrot	"Per nje dashuri"—Ermal Fejzullahu	Safe
Debora & Niko	27 (6, 7, 6, 8)	Tango	"Falma"—Blero ft. Shpat Kasapi	Safe
Alban & Odeta	9 (2, 2, 2, 3)	Latin	"Mendoja c'do gje merr fund pa ty"—Asgje sikur dielli	Eliminated
Elhaida & Ledian	32 (8, 8, 8, 8)	Contemporary	"S'je më"—Elhaida Dani	Safe
Salsano & Lori	32 (8, 8, 8, 8)	Waltz	"Vetëm ty"—Alban Skënderaj	Safe
Gent & Emanuela	24 (6, 6, 6, 6)	Bachata	"Lamtumire"—Stresi & Xheraldina Berisha	Safe
Arbër & Erisa	32 (8, 9, 7, 8)	Samba	"Ngadale"—Anjeza Branka & Niku	Safe
Ardit & Jora	32 (9, 7, 8, 8)	Quickstep	"Pasion"—Dr. Flori & Fatima	Safe

=== Week 4: Halloween Night ===
Couples are listed in the order they performed.

Couple	Score	Dance	Music	Result
Debora & Niko	22 (6, 5, 5, 6)	Viennese Waltz	"I Put a Spell on You"—Annie Lennox	Safe
Irini & Eltion	18 (4, 5, 4, 5)	Tango	"Disturbia"—Rihanna	Eliminated
Sara & Luixhino	32 (8, 9, 7, 8)	Contemporary	"Every Breath You Take"—The Police	Safe
Ardit & Jora	37 (9, 10, 9, 9)	Contemporary	"I Got 5 on It (Tethered Mix)"—Luniz feat. Michael Marshall from Us	Safe
Elona & Anxhelo	23 (6, 6, 5, 6)	Charleston	"Crazy in Love"—Emeli Sandé	Safe
Elhaida & Ledian	28 (7, 7, 7, 7)	Tango	"Swan Lake Remix"—District 78	Safe
Isli & Ledia	31 (8, 9, 6, 8)	Paso Doble	"Animals"—Martin Garrix	Safe
Arbër & Erisa	27 (6, 7, 7, 7)	Waltz	"I'd Do Anything for Love (But I Won't Do That)"—Meat Loaf feat. Lorraine Crosby	Safe
Gent & Emanuela	20 (5, 5, 5, 5)	Paso Doble	"Roundtable Rival"—Lindsey Stirling	Bottom two
Megi & Jurgen	26 (7, 7, 5, 7)	Viennese Waltz	"Secret"—The Pierces	Safe
Julia & Silvester	27 (7, 7, 6, 7)	Waltz	"You Don't Own Me"—Grace feat. G-Eazy	Safe
Salsano & Lori	36 (9, 9, 9, 9)	Contemporary	"Toxic"—2WEI	Safe

Judges' votes to save

- Dalina: Gent & Emanuela
- Armand: Gent & Emanuela
- Kledi: Did not vote
- Valbona: Gent & Emanuela

=== Week 5: Latin Night ===
This week, the show was in two parts. In the first part the couples danced in teams, and the winner team had immunity for the second part and the loser team had to dance again in one unlearned dance in the second part. Couples are listed in the order they performed.

Couple	Score	Dance	Music	Result
Arbër & Erisa Ardit & Jora Elhaida & Ledian Gent & Emanuela Julia & Silvester Sara & Luixhino	37 (10, 9, 9, 9)	Freestyle	"Despechá"—Rosalía "Monotonia"—Shakira & Ozuna "Tití Me Preguntó"—Bad Bunny "Don't Go Yet"—Camila Cabello	Winner (Won Immunity)
Debora & Niko Elona & Anxhelo Isli & Ledia Megi & Jurgen Salsano & Lori	33 (8, 9, 8, 8)	Freestyle	"Despechá"—Rosalía "Monotonia"—Shakira & Ozuna "Tití Me Preguntó"—Bad Bunny "Don't Go Yet"—Camila Cabello	Loser
Salsano & Lori	30 (7, 8, 7, 8)	Cha-Cha-Cha	"Chilly Cha Cha"—Jessica Jay	Bottom two
Debora & Niko	30 (7, 8, 7, 8)	Cha-Cha-Cha	"Bailar"—Deorro ft. Elvis Crespo	Safe
Isli & Ledia	31 (7, 9, 7, 8)	Samba	"Limbo"—Daddy Yankee	Safe
Elona & Anxhelo	23 (5, 6, 6, 6)	Salsa	"Reggaetón Lento (Bailemos)"—CNCO	Eliminated
Megi & Jurgen	33 (8, 8, 8, 9)	Paso Doble	"La Llorona"—Alanna Ubach & Antonio Sol	Safe

Judges' votes to save

- Dalina: Salsano & Lori
- Armand: Salsano & Lori
- Kledi: Did not vote
- Valbona: Salsano & Lori

=== Week 6: DigitAlb Movie Night ===
Couples are listed in the order they performed.

Couple	Score	Dance	Music	DigitAlb film	Result
Sara & Luixhino	26 (6, 7, 6, 7)	Charleston	"Kur me vjen burri nga stani"	Koncert ne Vitin 1936	Safe
Salsano & Lori	33 (8, 9, 8, 8)	Swing	"Hey! Pachuco!"	The Mask	Safe
Debora & Niko	33 (8, 8, 8, 9)	Foxtrot	"Let It Go"	Frozen	Safe
Arbër & Erisa	29 (7, 7, 7, 8)	Salsa	"Cinema Italiano"	Nine	Bottom two
Ardit & Jora	38 (10, 9, 9, 10)	Tango	"Clubbed to Death"	The Matrix	Safe
Isli & Ledia	34 (9, 8, 8, 9)	Jive	"Misirlou"	Pulp Fiction	Safe
Elhaida & Ledian	34 (9, 8, 8, 9)	Cha-Cha-Cha	"Lady Marmalade"	Moulin Rouge!	Safe
Megi & Jurgen	26 (6, 7, 6, 7)	Rumba	"After Dark"	From Dusk till Dawn	Safe
Julia & Silvester	32 (8, 8, 8, 8)	Tango	"Oh, Pretty Woman"	Pretty Woman	Safe
Gent & Emanuela	27 (6, 7, 7, 7)	Waltz	"Lulekuqet mbi Mure"	Lulekuqet mbi Mure	Eliminated

Judges' votes to save

- Dalina: Arbër & Erisa
- Armand: Gent & Emanuela
- Kledi: Arbër & Erisa (Since the other judges were not unanimous, Kledi, as head judge, made the final decision to save Arbër & Erisa.)
- Valbona: Arbër & Erisa

=== Week 7 ===
Couples are listed in the order they performed.

Couple	Score	Dance	Music	Result
Elhaida & Ledian	40 (10, 10, 10, 10)	Samba	"La Tortura"—Shakira feat. Alejandro Sanz	Safe
Debora & Niko	26 (6, 7, 6, 7)	Swing	"Not Fair"—Lily Allen	Eliminated
Megi & Jurgen	36 (9, 10, 8, 9)	Contemporary	"When the Party's Over"—Billie Eilish	Safe
Isli & Ledia	37 (9, 10, 9, 9)	Quickstep	"Umbrella"—The Baseballs	Safe
Julia & Silvester	30 (7, 8, 7, 8)	Samba	"Fireball"—Pitbull feat. John Ryan	Bottom two
Ardit & Jora	34 (8, 9, 8, 9)	Salsa	"Conga"—Gloria Estefan	Safe
Sara & Luixhino	30 (7, 8, 7, 8)	Bachata	"Obsesión"—Aventura feat. Judy Santos	Safe
Salsano & Lori	30 (7, 8, 7, 8)	Foxtrot	"Fever"—Peggy Lee	Safe
Arbër & Erisa	35 (9, 9, 8, 9)	Paso Doble	"Canción del Mariachi"—Los Lobos & Antonio Banderas	Safe

Judges' votes to save

- Dalina: Julia & Silvester
- Armand: Debora & Niko
- Kledi: Julia & Silvester (Since the other judges were not unanimous, Kledi, as head judge, made the final decision to save Julia & Silvester.)
- Valbona: Julia & Silvester

=== Week 8: Albanian dances night ===
Individual judges' scores are given in this order from left to right: Dalina Buzi, Armand Peza, Lili Cingu, Kledi Kadiu, Valbona Selimllari.

Lili Cingu appeared as a guest judge.

Couples are listed in the order they performed.

Couple	Score	Dance	Music
Arbër & Erisa	34 (6, 6, 9, 6, 7)	Vallja e Shqipeve	Albanian music
Isli & Ledia	49 (10, 10, 10, 9, 10)	Vallja e Dibres	Albanian music
Megi & Jurgen	39 (8, 7, 9, 7, 8)	Vallja e Tropojës	Albanian music
Julia & Silvester	39 (7, 8, 9, 7, 8)	Vallja e Librazhdit	Albanian music
Sara & Luixhino	48 (10, 10, 10, 9, 9)	Vallja e Rugovës	Albanian music
Elhaida & Ledian	50 (10, 10, 10, 10, 10)	Vallja e Tiranes	Albanian music
Ardit & Jora	50 (10, 10, 10, 10, 10)	Vallja e Osman Takes	Albanian music
Salsano & Lori	50 (10, 10, 10, 10, 10)	Vallja Gorarçe	Albanian music

=== Week 9: Switch-Up Night ===
The celebrities performed one unlearned dance with a different partner selected by themselves. Couples are listed in the order they performed.

Couple	Score	Dance	Music	Result
Julia & Jurgen	27 (6, 7, 6, 8)	Rock and Roll	"Somebody Told Me"—Måneskin	Safe
Megi & Lori	39 (10, 10, 9, 10)	Argentine tango	"...Baby One More Time"—Britney Spears	Safe
Isli & Jora	30 (6, 9, 7, 8)	Salsa	"La Bomba"—Ricky Martin	Safe
Salsano & Ledia	30 (7, 8, 7, 8)	Tango	"Carmen"—Stromae	Safe
Arbër & Silvester	31 (8, 8, 7, 8)	Contemporary	"Run Boy Run"—Woodkid	Eliminated
Sara & Ledian	34 (8, 9, 8, 9)	Paso Doble	"Natural"—Imagine Dragons	Safe
Ardit & Erisa	31 (8, 8, 7, 8)	Waltz	"I Have Nothing"—Whitney Houston	Bottom two
Elhaida & Luixhino	32 (8, 8, 8, 8)	Bachata	"Don't Start Now"—Dua Lipa	Safe

Dance-Off

Couples are listed in the order they performed.

Couple	Dance	Music	Result
Arbër & Erisa	Freestyle	"I Will Survive"—Gloria Gaynor	Eliminated
Ardit & Jora	Freestyle	"I Will Survive"—Gloria Gaynor	Safe

Judges' votes to save

- Dalina: Ardit & Jora
- Armand: Ardit & Jora
- Kledi: Did not vote, but would have voted to save Ardit & Jora
- Valbona: Ardit & Jora

=== Week 10: Elvana Gjata Night ===
Individual judges' scores are given in this order from left to right: Dalina Buzi, Armand Peza, Elvana Gjata, Kledi Kadiu, Valbona Selimllari.

Musical guest: Elvana Gjata—"Me tana"/"Puthe"/"Clap Clap"/"Loti". Gjata also appeared as a guest judge.

Each couple performed one dance to a song by Elvana Gjata. Couples are listed in the order they performed.

Couple	Score	Dance	Elvana Gjata Music
Ardit & Jora	41 (7, 8, 9, 8, 9)	Samba	"Disco Disco"
Sara & Luixhino	38 (6, 8, 10, 6, 8)	Waltz	"Më fal"
Salsano & Lori	41 (7, 9, 9, 7, 9)	Paso Doble	"Lejla"
Isli & Ledia	38 (7, 7, 9, 7, 8)	Tango	"Si unë"
Megi & Jurgen	40 (8, 7, 10, 7, 8)	Charleston	"Xheloz"
Elhaida & Ledian	44 (8, 8, 10, 9, 9)	Quickstep	"Mos u ngut"
Julia & Silvester	38 (6, 8, 10, 6, 8)	Contemporary	"Pow"

=== Week 11: Quarter-Final ===
Each couple performed one trio dance and one unlearned dance. Each couple chose one member from their Family or Friends to dance with them. Couples are listed in the order they performed.

Couple	Trio dance partner	Score	Dance	Music	Result
Salsano & Lori	Erjona Kakeli	40 (10, 10, 10, 10)	Waltz	"Home"—Michael Bublé	Safe
Salsano & Lori		34 (8, 9, 8, 9)	Samba	"Bella ciao"—Ndlovu Youth Choir	Safe
Megi & Jurgen	Ina & Marsi Pojani	37 (10, 9, 8, 10)	Freestyle	"Dirrty"—Christina Aguilera feat. Redman	Immune
Megi & Jurgen		36 (9, 9, 9, 9)	Quickstep	"Diamonds Are a Girl's Best Friend"—Marilyn Monroe	Immune
Elhaida & Ledian	Orsola Mema	26 (6, 7, 6, 7)	Freestyle	"Human"—The Killers	Bottom two
Elhaida & Ledian		40 (10, 10, 10, 10)	Jive	"Dear Future Husband"—Meghan Trainor	Bottom two
Sara & Luixhino	Agron Vula	36 (9, 9, 9, 9)	Waltz	"You Raise Me Up"—Josh Groban	Safe
Sara & Luixhino		38 (9, 10, 9, 10)	Salsa	"Que Viva la Vida"—Wisin	Safe
Ardit & Jora	Ardit's mother	40 (10, 10, 10, 10)	Contemporary	"Who You Are"—Jessie J	Safe
Ardit & Jora		38 (9, 10, 9, 10)	Argentine tango	"Assassin’s tango"—John Powell	Safe
Isli & Ledia	Ori Nebijaj	40 (10, 10, 10, 10)	Freestyle	"Uptown Funk"—Mark Ronson feat. Bruno Mars	Safe
Isli & Ledia		40 (10, 10, 10, 10)	Contemporary	"This place was a shelter"—Ólafur Arnalds	Safe
Julia & Silvester	Andi Islami	37 (9, 9, 9, 10)	Foxtrot	"Just the Two of Us"—Grover Washington Jr. & Bill Withers	Eliminated
Julia & Silvester		31 (8, 8, 7, 8)	Cha-Cha-Cha	"Hold My Hand"—Jess Glynne	Eliminated

Judges' votes to save

- Dalina: Elhaida & Ledian
- Armand: Elhaida & Ledian
- Kledi: Did not vote
- Valbona: Elhaida & Ledian

=== Week 12: Semifinal ===
Each couple performed one unlearned ballroom dance and one unlearned Latin dance. Two couples were eliminated at the end of the night in a double elimination. Couples are listed in the order they performed.

Couple	Score	Dance	Music	Result
Sara & Luixhino	34 (9, 8, 8, 9)	Quickstep	"Love On Top"—Beyoncé	Safe
Sara & Luixhino	34 (8, 9, 8, 9)	Samba	"Nel blu, dipinto di blu"—Gipsy Kings	Safe
Ardit & Jora	38 (10, 9, 9, 10)	Foxtrot	"Qaj"—Ardit Cuni & Daniela Toci	Bottom three
Ardit & Jora	40 (10, 10, 10, 10)	Cha-Cha-Cha	"Love Runs Out"—OneRepublic	Bottom three
Isli & Ledia	32 (8, 8, 7, 9)	Bachata	"Stand by Me"—Ben E. King	Eliminated by judges' votes
Isli & Ledia	34 (8, 9, 8, 9)	Charleston	"Milord"—Édith Piaf	Eliminated by judges' votes
Salsano & Lori	36 (9, 9, 9, 9)	Quickstep	"Sing, Sing, Sing (With a Swing)"—Benny Goodman	Eliminated immediately
Salsano & Lori	30 (7, 8, 7, 8)	Rumba	"Nana Triste"—Natalia Lacunza & Guitarricadelafuente	Eliminated immediately
Megi & Jurgen	36 (9, 9, 9, 9)	Cha-Cha-Cha	"When I Grow Up"—The Pussycat Dolls	Safe
Megi & Jurgen	33 (8, 8, 8, 9)	Foxtrot	"Diamonds"—Rihanna	Safe
Elhaida & Ledian	40 (10, 10, 10, 10)	Salsa	"María"—Ricky Martin	Safe
Elhaida & Ledian	40 (10, 10, 10, 10)	Waltz	"Kissing You"—Sam Smith ft. BBC Concert Orchestra	Safe

Dance-Off

Couples are listed in the order they performed.

Couple	Dance	Music	Result
Ardit & Jora	Cha-Cha-Cha	"Love Runs Out"—OneRepublic	Safe
Isli & Ledia	Charleston	"Milord"—Édith Piaf	Eliminated

Judges' votes to save

- Dalina: Ardit & Jora
- Armand: Ardit & Jora
- Kledi: Did not vote
- Valbona: Ardit & Jora

=== Week 13: Final ===
Couples are listed in the order they performed.

Couple	Score	Dance	Music	Result
Sara & Luixhino	40 (10, 10, 10, 10)	Cha-Cha-Cha	"Let's Get Loud"—Jennifer Lopez	Winners
Sara & Luixhino	38 (9, 10, 9, 10)	Freestyle	"Girl on Fire"—Alicia Keys/"Hollaback Girl"—Gwen Stefani/"Kings"—Ledri Vula	Winners
Sara & Luixhino	40 (10, 10, 10, 10)	Showdance	"One Moment in Time"—Whitney Houston	Winners
Ardit & Jora	40 (10, 10, 10, 10)	Paso Doble	"You Take My Hand"—Tinlicker ft. Jamie Irrepressible	4th place
Ardit & Jora	37 (9, 10, 9, 9)	Freestyle	"Creepin'"—Metro Boomin, the Weeknd & 21 Savage/"Watch Out for This (Bumaye)"—Major Lazer ft. Busy Signal, The Flexican & FS Green/"Boom Boom Pow"—Black Eyed Peas	4th place
Ardit & Jora	39 (10, 10, 9, 10)	Showdance	"Set Fire to the Rain"—Adele	4th place
Elhaida & Ledian	40 (10, 10, 10, 10)	Rumba	"Could I Have This Kiss Forever"—Whitney Houston & Enrique Iglesias	3rd place
Elhaida & Ledian	38 (9, 10, 9, 10)	Freestyle	"Crazy in Love"—Beyoncé ft. Jay-Z	3rd place
Elhaida & Ledian	40 (10, 10, 10, 10)	Showdance	"Rule the World"—Take That	3rd place
Megi & Jurgen	39 (10, 10, 9, 10)	Samba	"Hips Don't Lie"—Shakira ft. Wyclef Jean	Runners-Up
Megi & Jurgen	35 (8, 10, 8, 9)	Freestyle	"Survivor"—Destiny's Child/"Born This Way"—Lady Gaga	Runners-Up
Megi & Jurgen	39 (10, 10, 9, 10)	Showdance	"The Show Must Go On"—Queen	Runners-Up

== Dance chart ==
The couples performed the following each week:

- Week 1-4: One unlearned dance
- Week 5: One unlearned dance & team dance
- Week 6-10: One unlearned dance
- Week 11: One unlearned dance & one dance with family/friends
- Week 12: Two unlearned dances
- Week 13: Couple's first dance, Freestyle and Showdance

Dancing with the Stars (season 8) - Dance chart
Couple	Week																	
Couple	1	2	3	4	5		6	7	8	9	10	11		12		13		
Sara & Luixhino	Cha-Cha-Cha	Foxtrot	Tango	Contemp.	Team Freestyle	Immunity	Charleston	Bachata	Vallja e Rugovës	Paso Doble	Waltz	Waltz	Salsa	Quickstep	Samba	Cha-Cha-Cha	Freestyle	Showdance
Megi & Jurgen	Samba	Tango	Salsa	Viennese Waltz	Team Freestyle	Paso Doble	Rumba	Contemp.	Vallja e Tropojës	Argentine tango	Charleston	Freestyle	Quickstep	Cha-Cha-Cha	Foxtrot	Samba	Freestyle	Showdance
Elhaida & Ledian	Rumba	Paso Doble	Contemp.	Tango	Team Freestyle	Immunity	Cha-Cha-Cha	Samba	Vallja e Tiranes	Bachata	Quickstep	Freestyle	Jive	Salsa	Waltz	Rumba	Freestyle	Showdance
Ardit & Jora	Paso Doble	Bachata	Quickstep	Contemp.	Team Freestyle	Immunity	Tango	Salsa	Vallja e Osman Takes	Waltz	Samba	Contemp.	Argentine tango	Foxtrot	Cha-Cha-Cha	Paso Doble	Freestyle	Showdance
Isli & Ledia	Waltz	Cha-Cha-Cha	Rumba	Paso Doble	Team Freestyle	Samba	Jive	Quickstep	Vallja e Dibres	Salsa	Tango	Freestyle	Contemp.	Bachata	Charleston			
Salsano & Lori	Salsa	Jive	Waltz	Contemp.	Team Freestyle	Cha-Cha-Cha	Swing	Foxtrot	Vallja Gorarçe	Tango	Paso Doble	Waltz	Samba	Quickstep	Rumba			
Julia & Silvester	Quickstep	Rumba	Jive	Waltz	Team Freestyle	Immunity	Tango	Samba	Vallja e Librazhdit	Rock and Roll	Contemp.	Foxtrot	Cha-Cha-Cha					
Arbër & Erisa	Tango	Quickstep	Samba	Waltz	Team Freestyle	Immunity	Salsa	Paso Doble	Vallja e Shqipeve	Contemp.								
Debora & Niko	Jive	Salsa	Tango	Viennese Waltz	Team Freestyle	Cha-Cha-Cha	Foxtrot	Swing										
Gent & Emanuela	Charleston	Rock and Roll	Bachata	Paso Doble	Team Freestyle	Immunity	Waltz											
Elona & Anxhelo	Swing	Samba	Foxtrot	Charleston	Team Freestyle	Salsa												
Irini & Eltion	Bachata	Waltz	Salsa	Tango														
Alban & Odeta	Foxtrot	Contemp.	Latin															
Ilir & Frenki	Rock and Roll	Charleston																
