= Poni =

Poni may refer to:

- Poni (province), Burkina Faso
- Poni Adams (born 1921), American actress
- Project on Nuclear Issues, a program hosted by the Center for Strategic and International Studies
- Domagoj Gavran, klošar bez bele nicknamed "Poni"
- Poni, an Albanian singer
- Petru Poni, Romanian chemist
- Matilda Cugler-Poni, Romanian poet and wife of Petru

== See also ==
- Pony
- Pomi
- Pomni
