= Tom Boxer =

Romanian musician and DJ

- Born: Cosmin Simionică; 6 January 1977 (age 49); Craiova, Romania
- Genres: Popcorn
- Occupations: Electronic musician; DJ; record producer
- Years active: 2004–present
- Label: Roton
- Website: tomboxermusic.com

Tom Boxer (born Cosmin Simionică on 6 January 1977 in Craiova) is a Romanian musician, disc jockey and record producer.

== Musical Career ==
He released his debut studio album Zamorena in 2008, spawning the single "Brasil" in collaboration with Anca Parghel and Fly Project, which topped the Romanian Top 100. Success followed with "Morena" (2009) featuring Antonia, reaching number two in Romania and the top ten in several other countries. The single was promoted by a controversial music video featuring lesbian scenes. After Boxer quit relations with Antonia, he started to collaborate with his long-time girlfriend Morena; this yielded the commercially successful release "Deep in Love" in 2011, which was certified Platinum by the Federazione Industria Musicale Italiana (FIMI) for 30,000 copies sold in Italy.

== Discography ==
=== Singles ===
Title	Year	Peak chart positions									Certifications	Album
Title	Year	ROM	ROM Radio	ROM TV	BUL	HUN Dance	ITA	POL Dance	RUS	SPA	Certifications	Album
"Brasil" (featuring Anca Parghel and Fly Project)	2007	1	–	–	–	–	–	–	3	–		Zamorena
"A Beautiful Day" (featuring Jay)	2009	–	–	–	–	–	–	–	–	34		Morena
"Morena" (featuring Antonia)	2009	2	1	8	3	8	–	2	50	–		Morena
"Shake It Mamma" (featuring Antonia)	2010	—	–	–	–	–	–	–	–	–		Non-album singles
"You" (with Catherine Cassidy)	2011	–	–	–	–	–	–	–	–	–		Non-album singles
"I Feel You" (featuring Alexandra Blake)	2011	–	–	–	–	–	–	–	–	–		Non-album singles
"Deep in Love" (with Morena featuring J Warner)	2011	18	9	–	–	8	37	18	109	–	FIMI: Platinum	Non-album singles
"Voulez Vous" (with Morena featuring Meital De Razon)	2012	–	–	–	–	–	–	–	–	–		Non-album singles
"Summertime" (with Morena )	2013	–	–	–	–	–	–	–	–	–		Non-album singles
"Las Vegus" (with Morena featuring Sirreal)	2013	–	–	–	–	–	–	–	–	–		Non-album singles
"Don't Cry" (featuring Isaia)	2014	–	–	–	–	–	–	–	–	–		Non-album singles
"Balans" (with Morena)	2014	–	–	–	–	–	–	–	–	–		Non-album singles
"Vamos a bailar" (with Morena featuring Juliana Pasini)	2014	–	–	–	–	–	–	–	–	–		Non-album singles
"Beautiful Change"	2017	–	–	–	–	–	–	–	–	–		Non-album singles
"Lie" (with Morena featuring Veo)	2018	–	–	–	–	–	–	–	–	–		Non-album singles
"Love Is the Way"	2018	–	–	–	–	–	–	–	–	–		Non-album singles
"Never Let Me Go" (with Morena)	2019	–	–	–	–	–	–	–	–	–		Non-album singles
"—" denotes a release that did not chart or was not released in that territory.

== See also ==
- List of music released by Romanian artists that has charted in major music markets
