= Tiberian =

Tiberian may refer to:

- Mircea Tiberian (1955–2025), Romanian jazz pianist and composer
- Tiberian vocalization, an oral tradition within the Hebrew language
- Tiberian Hebrew, the variety of Hebrew based on Tiberian vocalization
- Tiberias, a city in Lower Galilee, Israel
- Tiberius, relating to the reign of the Roman emperor
- Command & Conquer: Tiberian series, several titles in a series of computer games
