= Deep in Love =

Single by Tom Boxer and Morena featuring J Warner
- Released: 31 October 2011
- Recorded: 2011
- Length: 3:28
- Label: Step and Go; Roton
- Songwriters: Tom Boxer; J Warner
- Producer: Boxer

Tom Boxer singles chronology
"You" (2011)	"Deep in Love" (2011)	"Voulez vous" (2012)

Audio sample
- "Deep in Love": file; help

Music video
- "Deep in Love" on YouTube

"Deep in Love" is a song by Romanian producer Tom Boxer and singer Morena, featuring guest vocals by English recording artist J Warner. It was released as a CD single in Italy on 31 October 2011 through Step and Go, while later made available for digital download in various countries on 14 February 2012 through Roton. The track was written by Boxer and Warner, and solely produced by Boxer; the latter came up with the song in Morocco in 2011 and recorded a demo while travelling to a concert there. He ultimately worked on the track for four months. A love song, its lyrics include a reference to the popular paradigm that men are from Mars and women are from Venus.

Filmed in a studio in Bucharest and on the Canary Islands, an accompanying music video for "Deep in Love" was uploaded to Roton's YouTube channel on 15 August 2011. For further promotion, the song was performed at the ZU Loves You event organized by Radio ZU. It reached the top 40 on Hungarian, Romanian, Polish and Italian music charts, while being awarded a Platinum certification in the latter region by the Federazione Industria Musicale Italiana (FIMI) for 30,000 copies sold.

== Background and release ==
"Deep in Love" was written by Tom Boxer and J Warner — the latter of whom provides guest vocals — while production was solely handled by Boxer. Boxer composed the song in 2011 in Morocco; while she and Morena were driving to a show there by car, he came up with a melody and recorded a demo on his mobile phone. Work on "Deep in Love" was completed in four months, and the vocals were mixed at a studio in London.

Lyrics from the love song include "I'm from Venus, you're from Mars/When we're together, we create stars", on which Morena elaborated during an interview, saying that it describes two persons that share a special connection and love, "creat[ing] stars [...] high up in the sky". Boxer stated that he "[likes] to put some message" in his material, and that the aforementioned lyrics were inspired by the popular paradigm that men are from Mars and women are from Venus.

"Deep in Love" was made available as a CD single in Italy on 31 October 2011 via Step and Go, and released for digital download in various countries on 14 February 2012 through Roton. Two remix extended plays (EPs) were also released, and the song was used on three Kontor Records compilations.

== Music video and promotion ==
An accompanying music video for "Deep in Love" was uploaded onto Roton's official YouTube channel on 15 August, preceded by the release of a teaser on 9 August 2011. It was filmed at a studio in Bucharest, Romania, as well as on the Canary Islands; all outfits used were created by Morena. The clip begins with Morena posing against a desert landscape, wearing a white catsuit with a red veil attached to its back and white boots. The rest of the video alternates between other shots, including her dancing with three background dancers, footage of Warner and Boxer, as well as close-up shots of Morena in front of a camera and a floral background. Occasionally, the song's lyrics and arrows appear onscreen. For further promotion, "Deep in Love" was performed on Radio ZU's Zu Loves You event on 16 February 2012.

== Commercial performance ==
Commercially, "Deep in Love" attained moderate success on record charts. It peaked at number 18 on native Romanian Top 100 in December 2011, while reaching number nine on Media Forest's radio airplay chart in early 2012. Media Forest conducted a year-end radio airplay chart for 2012, where the track ranked at number 29. "Deep in Love" reached number 37 on the FIMI Singles Chart, spending more than 40 weeks on the chart. It was eventually certified Platinum in the region in 2013 by the Federazione Industria Musicale Italiana (FIMI) for exceeding 30,000 in digital copies sold. The song peaked at number eight on Hungary's Dance Top 40 chart, number 18 on Poland's Dance Top 50 chart, and number 109 on the Tophit ranking in Russia.

== Track listings ==
- Italian CD single
1. "Deep in Love" (Extended Version) – 5:03
2. "Deep in Love" (Club Edit) – 5:18
3. "Deep in Love" (Kros vs Simone Farina Remix) – 5:17
4. "Deep in Love" (Pink Room Remix) – 5:06
5. "Deep in Love" (Radio Edit) – 3:28
- Digital download
1. "Deep in Love" (Radio Edit) [feat. J Warner] – 3:28
- Remix EP 1
1. "Deep in Love" (Radio Edit) – 3:28
2. "Deep in Love" (Club Edit) – 5:17
3. "Deep in Love" (Extended Version) – 5:02
4. "Deep in Love" (The Perez Brothers Remix) – 5:17
5. "Deep in Love" (The Perez Brothers Remix Radio Edit) – 3:49
6. "Deep in Love" (Pink Room Remix) – 5:05
- Remix EP 2
1. "Deep in Love" (Extended Version) – 5:03
2. "Deep in Love" (Club Edit) – 5:18
3. "Deep in Love" (Kros vs Simone Farina Remix) – 5:17
4. "Deep in Love" (Pink Room Remix) – 5:06
5. "Deep in Love" (Radio Edit) – 3:28

== Credits and personnel ==
Credits adapted from the liner notes of the CD single.

- Songwriter – Tom Boxer, J. Warner
- Producer – Tom Boxer
- Mix – Karim Razak, Kros, Oreste Spagnuolo, Simone Farina

== Charts ==
=== Weekly charts ===
Weekly chart performance for "Deep in Love"
Chart (2011–2012)	Peak position
Hungary (Dance Top 40)	8
Italy (FIMI)	37
Poland (Dance Top 50)	18
Romania (Romanian Top 100)	18
Romania Radio Songs (Media Forest)	9
Russia (Tophit)	109

=== Year-end charts ===
Year-end chart performance for "Deep in Love"
Chart (2012)	Rank
Italy (FIMI)	70
Romania (Media Forest)	29

== Certifications ==
Certifications for "Deep in Love"
Region	Certification	Certified units/sales
Italy (FIMI)	Platinum	30,000^{*}
^{*} Sales figures based on certification alone.

== Release history ==
Release dates for "Deep in Love"
Country	Date	Format	Label	Ref.
Italy	31 October 2011	CD single	Step and Go	
Various	14 February 2012	Digital download	Roton	

== See also ==
- List of music released by Romanian artists that has charted in major music markets
