= The Bodyguard's Cure =

- Theatrical release poster
- Directed by: Carlo Arturo Sigon
- Written by: Carlo Arturo Sigon; Walter Lupo
- Screenplay by: Pasquale Plastino; Sandrone Dazieri
- Produced by: Maurizio Totti
- Starring: Claudio Bisio; Stefania Rocca; Ernest Borgnine
- Cinematography: Federico Masiero
- Edited by: Claudio Cormio
- Music by: Daniele Luppi
- Production company: Colorado Film
- Distributed by: Warner Bros. Pictures
- Release date: 3 February 2006
- Country: Italy
- Language: Italian

The Bodyguard's Cure (Italian: La cura del gorilla) is a 2006 Italian neo-noir film directed by Carlo Arturo Sigon.

== Cast ==
- Claudio Bisio: Sandrone
- Stefania Rocca: Vera
- Ernest Borgnine: Jerry Warden
- Antonio Catania: Giò Pesce
- Gigio Alberti: Luke
- Bebo Storti: Gipi
- Kledi Kadiu: Adrian
