= Kledi Kadiu =

Albanian-Italian dancer-actor

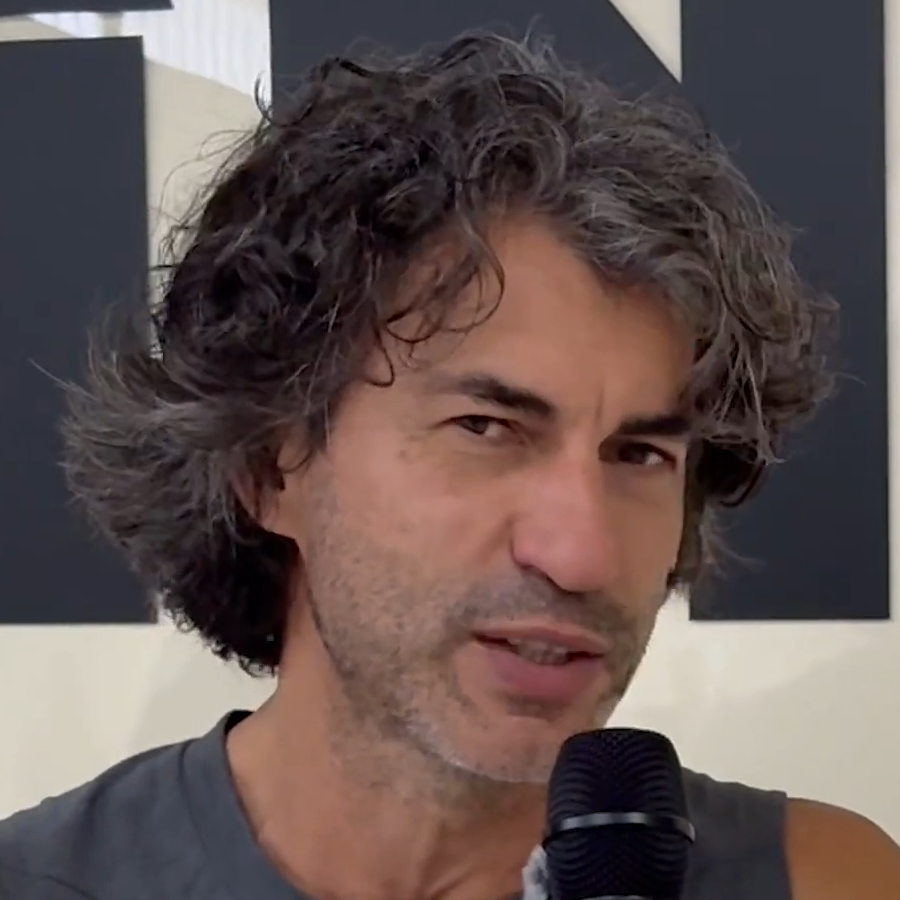
- Born: 7 April 1974 (age 52); Tirana, PR Albania
- Occupations: Dancer; dance teacher; choreographer; television personality; actor

Kledi Kadiu (born 7 April 1974) also known simple as Kledi, is an Albanian-born naturalized Italian dancer, choreographer, dance teacher and television personality. He is a regular dancer on the popular talent show Amici di Maria De Filippi (Friends of Maria De Filippi), which is presented by Maria De Filippi on Mediaset's Canale 5. He starred in his first film Passa a Due in 2005. In 2008, Kadiu became an Italian citizen.

== Career ==
Kledi Kadiu was born in Tirana, Albania, the son of Fisnik Kadiu, an engineer, and Lindita Kadiu, a pharmacist. He grew up in an apartment in the centre of Tirana, along with his parents, sister Ada, and grandparents Xhavit and Kimete. Kadiu attended the National Dance Academy, where he graduated in 1992. He soon began working as a ballet dancer in the National Theatre of Opera and Ballet, where he became the principal dancer, performing in ballets such as Giselle, The Nutcracker Suite, Don Quixote and Daphnis et Chloé.

In 1993, at the age of nineteen, he moved to Italy. Three years later, he made his television debut as a dancer on the Canale 5 programme Quizzone. From 1997 to 2003, Kadiu was a regular dancer on the Buona Domenica variety show. This was followed by work on two popular programmes hosted by Maria De Filippi on Canale 5, C'è posta per te and the Fame-based talent show Amici di Maria De Filippi.

Kadiu posed for the 2003 Calendar of the men's magazine Max. In 2004, Kadiu founded the Kledi Dance school in Rome. The following year, he starred in his first film Passo a Due, a semi-biographical movie directed by Andrea Barzini, where Kadiu portrays Beni, a young Albanian who arrives in Italy seeking fame and fortune as a dancer. He starred in another cinematographic film, La cura del gorilla, as well as a television mini-series which was broadcast by Rai Uno in 2007. That same year, he performed in the ballet Romeo and Juliet, which was produced by the dance company Balletto di Roma.

Kadiu has won two awards. In 2004, he received the Premio Gino Tani Award for Best Artist of the Year, and in 2006, he received the Ginestra d'Oro Award for Best Dancer of the Year.

In January 2009, Kadiu returned to Amici di Maria De Filippi where he is one of the regular dancers on the programme.

On 27 January 2009, Kadiu's autobiography, Meglio di una Favola (Better Than a Fairy-Tale), published by Mondadori, went on sale in Italy.

On 2 September 2022, it was announced that Kadiu would be a judge on the eighth season of the Albanian version of Dancing with the Stars on Top Channel.

In November 2023, he was announced as one of the hosts of the 62nd edition of the Albanian song contest Festivali i Këngës.

== Personal life ==
In 2005, Kadiu began dating Desy Luccini, who was elected Miss Deborah Toscana 2005, and also a finalist in the 2005 edition of the Miss Italy Beauty Pageant. The relationship ended in 2007.

In May 2008, Kadiu was physically assaulted and verbally-abused by a group of three men in a xenophobic attack which took place inside his dance school in the Appio district of Rome. Although Kadiu was not seriously hurt, the attack was condemned by the city's mayor Gianni Alemanno.

At an official ceremony in the Palazzo del Quirinale presided over by Italian president Giorgio Napolitano, Kadiu became an Italian citizen in November 2008. However, he remains proud of his Albanian origins, is a prominent member of the Albanian community in Italy, and was chosen as the face of the "Italian-Albanian Friendship Day" organized by the Italian Foreign Ministry in Tirana, Albania.

== Filmography ==
=== As an actor ===
Year	Title	Role
2005	Passo a due	Beni
2006	The Bodyguard's Cure	Adrian
2007	Ma chi l'avrebbe mai detto	Yassin

=== As himself ===
Year	Title	Notes
2001–2017	Amici di Maria De Filippi	Talent show: professional dancer and member of the dance crew (seasons 1–2, 4–9); contemporary dance teacher (seasons 13–17)
2005	Striscia la notizia	Variety show: guest host (season 17) alongside Maria De Filippi and Garrison Rochelle
2016	Pequeños gigantes	Children's talent show: coach (season 1)
2017	Just Dance World Cup	Special: judge (Just Dance talent show)
2022–2023	Dancing with the Stars	Judge season 8
2023	Festivali i Këngës 62	Host
