= Morena (Tom Boxer song) =

Single by Tom Boxer featuring Antonia

from the album Morena and This Is Antonia
- Released: October 2009
- Length: 3:35
- Label: Radikal; AATW
- Songwriter: Tom Boxer
- Producer: Boxer

Tom Boxer singles chronology
"Beautiful Day" (2009)	"Morena" (2009)	"Shake It Mamma" (2010)

Antonia singles chronology
"Roses on Fire" (2009)	"Morena" (2009)	"Shake It Mamma" (2010)

"Morena" (also known under the title of "Morena My Love") is a song by Romanian producer Tom Boxer and singer Antonia for Boxer's third studio album of the same name (2010) and the latter's first record This Is Antonia (2015). Written and produced solely by Boxer, the song was released in October 2009. Boxer came up with it in Greece, waiting for his order to arrive at a restaurant. A music critic from Viva magazine praised "Morena" for its catchiness and simple structure. The song also received an award in the Best Dance category at the 2010 Romanian Music Awards.

An accompanying music video for the track was released on 19 February 2010, featuring Antonia making out with a woman after leaving a bar she performed at. The clip aroused controversy for its portrayal of lesbianism, but attained heavy airplay in Romania and Poland. "Morena" was performed on multiple occasions, including on X Factor Bulgaria in 2011. On several concert dates, Antonia was replaced with other singers due to her pregnancy at the time. Commercially, the single went on to reach number two on native Romanian Top 100 and the top ten on Bulgarian, Hungarian and Polish charts.

== Background and release ==
Romanian producer Tom Boxer and singer Antonia have met in 2008, subsequently releasing the single "Roses on Fire" in 2009, achieving success in Romania. Both joined again in the October of the same year and launched another single, "Morena", also known as "Morena My Love". The track was eventually made available for digital download in 2011 in the United States, United Kingdom and several European countries. It was also later featured on Boxer's third studio album of the same name (2010) and on Antonia's first studio album This Is Antonia (2015). In an interview with Musichat.ro, Boxer — who solely wrote and produced "Morena" — revealed that he came up with the song while in vacation in Greece, waiting at a restaurant for his greek salad to arrive. "Bored", he recorded his ideas as a demo on his mobile phone. Eventually, he invited Antonia to his studio and used her first recording attempt for the track's final cut.

== Reception ==
An editor of Romanian magazine Viva praised "Morena", attributing its commercial success to it being catchy and easy to sing along to. Pro FM included the track in their list of Antonia's best songs. Chartwise, "Morena" reached number two on native Romanian Top 100 in early 2010, while also topping Media Forest's radio airplay chart. The song peaked at number 19 on Romanian Top 100's year-end chart in 2010, and reached numbers ten and 91 on the year-end rankings conducted by Media Forest in 2010 and 2011, respectively. Elsewhere, "Morena" reached number three on the Bulgarian radio airplay chart, number eight on the Hungarian Dance Top 40 chart, number one in Poland and two on its Dance Top 50 component chart, as well as number 20 in Israel, 50 in the Commonwealth of Independent States, and number 69 in Greece. At the 2010 Romanian Music Awards, the song won an award in the Best Dance category.

== Music video ==
A screenshot of the music video, showing Antonia (right) singing in a bar while Cristina Bizu (left) dances around her. Both eventually kiss, which caused controversy for the video's portrayal of lesbianism.

An accompanying music video for "Morena" was exclusively premiered on Kiss TV on 19 February 2010, followed by its release onto the official YouTube channel of label Roton on the same date. The clip was shortly made private on the aforementioned platform, with an Urban.ro editor suggesting that this had been done to allow further work on it. The music video was filmed by Tom Boxer in early 2010, who wrote on his blog that it "was shot as a short film not as a regular video". Selected outfits used were specifically created for the visual, and it features cameo appearances by Romanian musicians Mike Diamondz, Tom Boxer and Cristina Bizu.

The music video begins with a close shot of Antonia licking honey that is poured onto a microphone. Wearing a black suit with a white ribbon attached to its back, she is later seen carrying a CD and performing in front of an audience at a bar. Subsequently, a woman from the audience sporting a white dress and hat (Bizu) stands up and walks to Antonia. After dancing to the song around her, she mimes kissing her by holding her hat in front of their faces. As the music video transitions, Antonia walks out of the bar crying. Dialogue is shown onscreen as Bizu appears from behind, wanting Antonia not to leave. In response, the singer expresses her love for Bizu, but is disappointed about her having a relationship with a man. Antonia tells her that she wants to leave and asks Bizu to come with her, kissing her to "help [her] decide". As Antonia drives off, Bizu calls her name and gets inside eventually. The clip ends with both kissing again in the car, with Bizu admitting that "[Antonia's] kiss really helped [her] decide".

Upon its release, the music video was controversial for its depiction of lesbianism. According to Antonia in an interview on Romanian show La Măruță, the clip was made "for fun", without having a real message. She also revealed that her kiss with Morena was fake, and that the clip's scenery was inspired by telenovelas. On another occasion in Macedonia, the singer stated that the visual's lesbian vibe was not captured in the song itself. The clip attained notable television airplay in Romania and Poland, peaking at numbers eight and one on Media Forest's and on ZPAV's airplay charts.

== Live performances ==
"Morena" received promotion through several live performances. On various concert dates, Antonia was replaced with other singers due to her pregnancy. She herself performed "Morena" at the 2011 Armenian Music Awards and at Romanian talk show Neața cu răzvan și dani in 2010. Tom Boxer used singer Alexandra Blake for the 2010 Hity na czasie in Poland and another Neața cu răzvan și dani appearance in 2011. Bizu also sang the track on X Factor Bulgaria in 2011 and at Radio ZU's ZU Loves You event in Romania in 2012.

== Track listing ==
- American digital download/CD single
1. "Morena" (Original Radio Edit) [feat. Antonia] – 3:35
2. "Morena" (Extended Original Mix) [feat. Antonia] – 6:03
3. "Morena" (Treitl Hammond Remix) [feat. Antonia] – 6:41
4. "Morena" (Victor Magan Remix) [feat. Antonia] – 5:48
5. "Morena" (Malibu Breeze Remix) [feat. Antonia] – 6:50
6. "Morena" (UK Edit) [feat. Antonia] – 3:35
- British digital download
1. "Morena" (Radio Edit) [feat. Antonia] – 3:33
- Digital remixes EP
1. "Morena" (The Perez Brother Remix) – 5:15
2. "Morena" (Kash Trivedi Remix) – 6:47
3. "Morena" (Sean Garnier Remix) – 8:05
4. "Morena" (Mute Box & PhunkBomb Remix) – 6:38
5. "Morena" (Funky Junction & Claudio Viti Remix) – 5:13

== Charts ==
=== Weekly charts ===
Chart (2010–2011)	Peak position
Bulgaria (BAMP)	1
CIS Airplay (TopHit)	50
Greece (IFPI Greece)	69
Hungary (Dance Top 40)	8
Israel (Media Forest)	20
Poland Airplay (ZPAV)	1
Poland (Dance Top 50)	2
Poland TV Airplay (ZPAV)	1
Romania (Romanian Top 100)	2
Romania Radio Songs (Media Forest)	1
Romania TV Airplay (Media Forest)	8

=== Year-end charts ===
Chart (2010)	Peak position
Romania (Romanian Top 100)	19
Romania (Media Forest)	10
Chart (2011)	Peak position
Romania (Media Forest)	91

== Release history ==
Territory	Date	Format(s)	Label
Romania	October 2009	—N/a	—N/a
United States	11 January 2011	Digital download	Radikal
United States	N/A 2011	CD single	Radikal
United Kingdom	12 June 2011	Digital download	AATW
Various	2 November 2011	Digital download	Radikal
