= Mircea Tiberian =

Romanian musician (1955–2025)

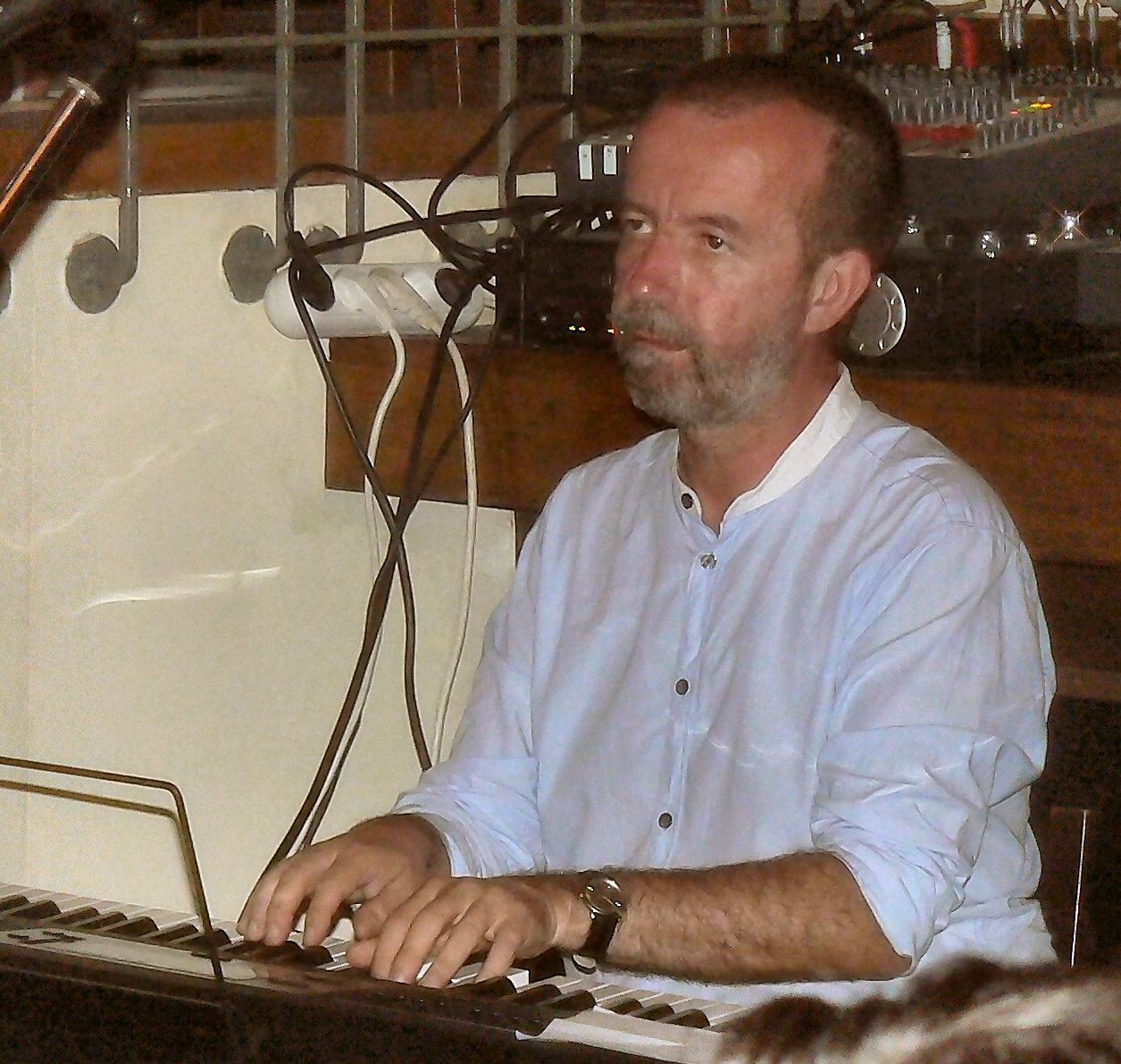
- Tiberian in 2008

Background information
- Born: 4 May 1955; Cluj, Romania
- Died: 18 October 2025 (aged 70) Galați, Romania
- Genres: Jazz
- Occupation(s): Musician, academic
- Instrument: Piano
- Years active: 1974–2025
- Website: https://mirceatiberian.com/

Mircea Tiberian (4 May 1955 – 18 October 2025) was a Romanian jazz musician and academic who was a professor of music at the National University of Music in Bucharest. He coordinated the jazz department, which he set up in 1991.

== Life and career ==
Tiberian spent his childhood and adolescence in Sibiu, Transylvania, where he made his debut at the International Jazz Festival in 1974. He held a doctorate in music. Tiberian later lived in Bucharest. He performed around the world with such musicians as Larry Coryell, Tomasz Stanko, Herb Robertson, John Betsch, Ed Shuller, Nicholas Simion, Adam Pierończyk, Maurice de Martin, Theo Jörgensmann and the Romanians Johnny Raducanu, Aura Urziceanu, Anca Parghel and Dan Mandrila. Tiberian died on 18 October 2025, at the age of 70.

== Awards ==
- Composers Union Award (1990, 1996, 2000, 2003)
- Romanian Musician of the Year Award (2003, 2007, 2008)
- The Enescu-Brancusi Scholarship granted by the Romanian Cultural Institute

== Publications ==
- Tehnica Improvizatiei in Muzica de Jazz (A Course of Improvisation Techniques), Editura UNMB, Bucharest, 2005
- Notes on Music and Music Notes (book and CDs), Editura Muzeului National al Literaturii Romane, Bucharest, 2005
- Cartea de muzica (An anthology of musicology studies), Editura Tracus Arte, Bucharest, 2008

== Intercultural projects ==
Liniada (2000), Agnus Dei (2001), Les annes folles de Bucharest (2004), Jazz and Cinema (2005 –20??), Dark (2006), Eurotique (2006), Jazzy Tarot - musical (2007–2008) – theatre Metropolis Bucuresti

== Discography ==
- Magic Bird (Electrecord, 1990)
- Never Ending Story (Blue Label, 1992)
- Working Underground (Prima Records, 1994)
- Alone in Heaven (Intercont, 1998)
- Hotel of Three Beginnings (Intercont, 1999)
- Interzone (Editura Casa Radio, 2000)
- Interzone plays with Adam Pieronczyk (Not Two, 2001)
- Crossing Atlas 45 (Not Two, 2002)
- Eleven (Jazz and More, 2002)
- Back to my Angel (Editura Muzicala, 2002)
- Viata Lumii (Jazz and More, 2003)
- Lumini (La Strada, 2003)
- Palindrome (Jazz and More, 2004)
- Shining of the Abyss (Jazz and More, 2004)
- Notes on Music and Music Notes – double CD anthology (Editura Muzeului National al Literaturii Romane, 2005)
- Dark (Editura Muzeului National al Literaturii Romane, 2006)
- November (Openart Records, 2008)
- Ulysses (Openart Records, 2008)
