= Anca Parghel =

Romanian musician

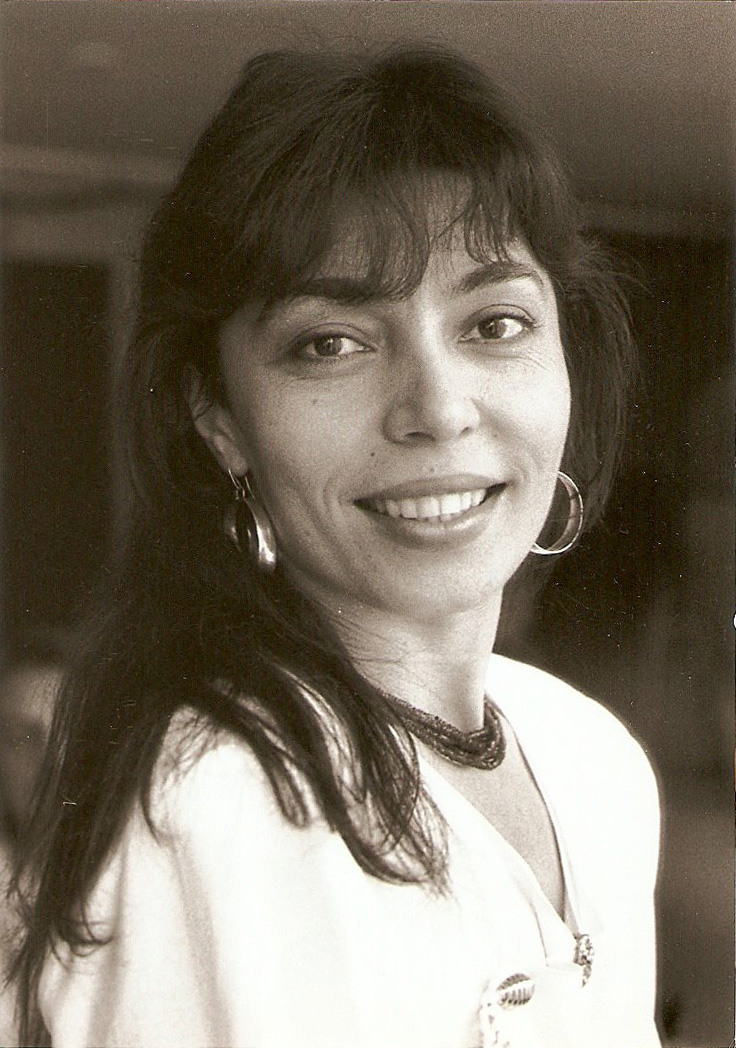
- Anca Parghel c. 1999

Background information
- Born: Anca Simion; September 16, 1957; Câmpulung Moldovenesc, Suceava County, Romania
- Died: December 5, 2008 (aged 51) Timișoara, Timiș County, Romania
- Genres: Jazz, vocal jazz
- Occupations: Musician, composer
- Instruments: Vocals, piano
- Years active: 1984–2008
- Labels: Electrecord, Blue Flame, Amadeo, Polydor, Koala, Nabel, Prima Club, Intercont, Miramar, Acoustic, Nrg!a/Roton
- Website: www.ancaparghel.ro
- Resting place: Bellu Cemetery, Bucharest

Anca Parghel (September 16, 1957– December 5, 2008) was a Romanian jazz singer, composer, arranger, pianist, choir conductor, and music teacher. As a jazz vocalist, she excelled in scat, vocal percussion, and improvisation. Her voice had a four octave range, this being one of the reasons she was compared to Yma Sumac in the Romanian music press. She had an exceptional ability to interpret songs in English, French, German, Italian, Spanish, or Portuguese.

== Biography ==
=== Early years ===
Born in Câmpulung Moldovenesc, Suceava County, Romania, to a poor family, she began singing at the age of three and performed onstage as a prodigy child. She also sang in the local church choir.

She left home at age 14 to enroll at the Music High School in Iaşi. Anca Parghel attended the Iaşi Music Conservatory, from which she graduated in 1981, having as primary instrument piano, and secondary bel canto. However, since jazz was not exactly popular nor officially encouraged in this part of the world living behind the Iron Curtain, she studied jazz on her own from tapes and vinyl albums that were hard to find. At the age of 18, she married painter Virgiliu Parghel (divorced 2001), with whom she had two sons, Ciprian and Tudor, who became jazz musicians themselves.

=== Teaching ===
Anca Parghel taught music in Suceava (Bucovina, Northern part of Romania) at the local Arts high-school before turning to a professional singing career (c. 1988–1989). She lived in Bucharest in the first part of the 1990s, before moving to Brussels in 1997. She was a professor of vocal jazz at the Royal Conservatory in Brussels and the Lemmens Institute in Leuven (1997–2002). She lived in Brussels for eight years before making a return to her home country around 2005. Her Conservatory diploma dissertation work was about the improvisation of Charlie Parker. As a music instructor and choir conductor, she taught many generations of aspiring singers and professional musicians, and led many workshops across Europe in Bucharest, Chișinău, Brussels, Namur, in Germany and England.

=== Performing ===
She was a gifted jazz pianist and frequently played "one-woman shows" where she accompanied herself in the crooner's tradition. She composed her own jazz songs, including original poetical lyrics as in the Primal Sound album, and frequently arranged music for Big Band orchestras, frequently performing with the Romanian Big Band conducted by Ionel Tudor in Bucharest. She toured extensively in Europe, mostly playing in local jazz clubs in Germany, the Netherlands, Belgium, France, Italy, Spain, Austria and Switzerland.

She performed in Canada, most notably at the Rimouski Jazz Festival 2003 where she preceded and eclipsed famed French singer Anne Ducros (cf. Rimouski local press, in early September 2003 reporting on "Rimouski Festi Jazz"), and sporadically in the United States (2003–2006). She performed on-stage and recorded with well-known jazz performers such as Aldo Romano, Archie Shepp, Billy Hart, Bruno Castellucci, Charles Loos, Claudio Roditi, Decebal Badila, Eric Legnini, Felix Simtaine, Gustavo Bergalli, Hein van de Geyn, Ivan Paduart, Jean-Louis Rassinfosse, John Dankworth, John Engels, John Ruocco, Jon Hendricks, Klaus Ignatzek, Larry Coryell, Marc Levine, Mark Griffith, Mircea Tiberian, Norma Winstone, Paolo Radoni, Peter Herbolzheimer, Peter Hertmans, Philip Catherine, Pierre Vaiana, Pierre Van Dormael, Riccardo Del Fra, Rob Radna, Ron Van Rossum, Stéphane Galland, Theo de Jong, Tomasz Stanko, and the Romanian Radio Big-Band.

She made unannounced late night appearances at jazz clubs in New York City, where she played with the local bands led either by Pat Higgins at the "Lennox Lounge", "St. Nick's Pub" or by Manny Duran at Cleopatra's Needle. Her concert in Danville, Virginia, at the North Theater on November 10, 2006, was played to an enchanted full house and created a local sensation (cf. Danville, Virginia press).

Anca Parghel recorded an electro-pop album in 2007, and submitted the tune "Brasil" to National Selection Contest 2008 for Eurovision. The song was not selected, but "Brasil" gained commercial success in Romania and in Europe.

Anca Parghel died in Timișoara from late complications of breast cancer. She appeared on stage one month prior to her death. She was buried on the "Artists' Alley" at Bellu Cemetery in Bucharest, not far from Romanian artists Maria Tănase, Florian Pittiș, and Adrian Pintea.

== Discography ==
- Tinerii dansează (Electrecord, 1986)
- Soul, My Secret Place (Blue Flame, 1987)
- Magic Bird (with Mircea Tiberian) (Electrecord, 1990)
- Indian Princess (Blue Flame, 1990)
- Octet Ost (Amadeo, 1990)
- Ron und Tania (Polydor, 1991)
- Is That So? (Koala, 1992)
- Airballoon (Nabel, 1992)
- Beautiful Colours (Nabel, 1993)
- Carpathian Colours (Nabel, 1994)
- Jazz, My Secret Soul (Intercont, 1994)
- Noapte albă de crăciun/White Christmas Night (Prima Club, 1994)
- Indian Princess (Jazz Specials Edition) (Miramar 1995)
- Midnight Prayer (Intercont, 1996)
- Primal Sound (Acoustic Music, 1999)
- Zamorena (feat. Tom Boxer; Roton, 2008)
- Brasil (Re-release of Zamorena feat. Tom Boxer and Fly Project; Roton, 2009)
