= Clap Clap (Gran Error, Elvana Gjata and Antonia song) =

2022 single by Gran Error, Elvana Gjata and Antonia

Single by Gran Error, Elvana Gjata and Antonia
- Language: English, Spanish
- Released: 8 July 2022
- Length: 2:41
- Label: Global
- Songwriters: Achi; Iraida; Marcel Botezan; Sebastian Barac
- Producers: Achi; Marcel Botezan; Sebastian Barac

Gran Error singles chronology
| "Shukar" (2021) | "Clap Clap" (2022) |

Elvana Gjata singles chronology
| "Gajde" (2022) | "Clap Clap" (2022) |

Antonia singles chronology
| "Tranquilo Papi" (2022) | "Clap Clap" (2022) | "Ibiza" (2022) |

Music video
- "Clap Clap" on YouTube

"Clap Clap" is a song by Romanian duo Gran Error, Albanian singer Elvana Gjata and Romanian singer Antonia. The song was produced by Achi, Marcel Botezan and Sebastian Barac, who served as co-writers with Iraida. It was released as a single for digital download and streaming by Global Records on 8 July 2022. An English and Spanish-language techno-inspired song, it encourages to be bold and transparent, and to let go of anything that stops their freedom. The song received positive receptions from a few music critics, who applauded the music and sound. It reached the record charts at number one in Albania, number three in Romania and number 32 in Poland. An accompanying music video was directed by Alexandru Muresan and Elena Maria Popescu, and uploaded to Gjata's YouTube channel alongside the single release. Filmed in Bucharest, Romania, the video finds the artists and several other people dancing and partying in a karting arena and gaming center.

== Background and composition ==
Achi, Marcel Botezan and Sebastian Barac produced "Clap Clap" and wrote it with Iraida. The song was released as a single for digital download and streaming by Global Records in various territories on 8 July 2022. Regarding their collaboration, Antonia stated, "I'm super excited about this collaboration with Elvana, she is an artist I admire for her talent and energy, I feel we have a lot of chemistry and I hope it is not the first and last time we sing together. And of course I love Gran Error, some of the most talented producers I've worked with [...]" An English and Spanish-language techno-inspired song, "Clap Clap" has been described as an anthem of fun with a catchy rhythm and a good energy. Featuring an empowerment message, the song encourages someone to be bold and transparent, and to let go of anything that stops them from being free.

== Reception ==
"Clap Clap" was met with positive receptions from a few music critics upon release. Zangba Thomson for Bong Mintes Entertainment labelled the song as an "enjoyable tune" with a narrative reminiscent of Puerto Rican singer Farruko's single "Pepas" (2021). He further wrote that "[it] welcomes listeners to a fun town, where you might feel down if the music stops playing". B. Gorani from Radio Televizioni 21 complimented the song's music and sound, writing that "if you listen to it, you will not be able to remain passive, since the rhythm will keep you dancing". A writer of News-31 commended the collaboration between the artists, adding that "['the song'] would make you dance even after 12 hours of work […] but also because of the artists". Commercially, "Clap Clap" reached number one in Albania, number three on the Romanian Radio Airplay chart and number 32 on the Polish Airplay Top 100 ranking. The song also reached number eight on the airplay chart published by Uniunea Producătorilor de Fonograme din România (UPFR) on 8 November. It further received radio airplay among stations in the Commonwealth of Independent States (CIS), Russia, Ukraine and Lithuania. The song was listed at number 77 on the Media Forest's 2022 Summer Chart in Romania. In the year 2022, Top Albania Radio included the song in its year-end compilation of the top songs, positioning it at number five.

== Music video ==
The music video for "Clap Clap" was uploaded to Gjata's official YouTube channel on 8 July 2022. The video was directed by Alexandru Muresan and Elena Maria Popescu, with footage filmed at the Vmax Karting and Hype Arena in Bucharest, Romania. In the beginning, it introduces Gjata and Antonia standing close to each other on a karting runway, succeeded by a scene of a group of young people entering an empty gaming center and then a shot of Gran Error in a virtually dark setting. As the video progresses, Gjata is shown singing and walking on the runway, interrupted by scenes of the group of dancing people, until Antonia appears. Antonia is depicted singing in a pink and turquoise-lighted setting, both on a runway and in the gaming center. Other shots find them singing and dancing together in the aforementioned settings, accompanied by several partying people. Further interspersed scenes throughout the main plot show retro-styled images and videos of the singers. Anna Tepșanu from Kiss FM labelled the video as "cool" and "dynamic", while Thomson of Bong Mintes Entertainment deemed it "attractive", complimenting Gjata and Antonia's "fashionable" outfits.

== Charts ==
=== Weekly charts ===
Weekly chart performance for "Clap Clap"
| Chart (2022–2023) | Peak position |
|---|---|
| Albania (The Top List) | 1 |
| CIS Airplay (TopHit) | 121 |
| Latvia Airplay (TopHit) | 117 |
| Lithuania Airplay (Radiomonitor) | 3 |
| Poland Airplay (ZPAV) | 32 |
| Romania Airplay (UPFR) | 8 |
| Romania Airplay (Media Forest) | 3 |
| Ukraine Airplay (TopHit) | 180 |

=== Monthly charts ===
Monthly chart performance for "Clap Clap"
| Chart (2023) | Peak position |
|---|---|
| Romania Airplay (TopHit) | 27 |

=== Year-end charts ===
Year-end chart performance for "Clap Clap"
| Chart (2022) | Position |
|---|---|
| Albania (The Top List) | 5 |
| Romania Airplay (Media Forest) | 22 |

== Release history ==
Release dates and formats for "Clap Clap"
| Region | Date | Format(s) | Label | Ref. |
|---|---|---|---|---|
| Various | 8 July 2022 | Digital download; streaming | Global | |
