= Call the Police (G Girls song) =

Single by G Girls
- Released: 14 June 2016
- Genre: Eurodance
- Length: 3:08
- Label: Global; Roton; Ego
- Songwriters: Eric Turner; Julimar Santos Oliveira Neponunceno
- Producers: Marcel Botezan; Sebastian Barac

G Girls singles chronology
"Call the Police" (2016)	"Milk & Honey" (2017)

Music video
- "Call the Police" on YouTube

"Call the Police" is a song recorded by Romanian girl supergroup G Girls. It was made available for digital consumption on 14 June 2016 through Global Records and Roton worldwide, while being distributed in Italy on 15 July 2016 by Ego. Serving as the group's debut recording, the track was written by Eric Turner and J-Son, while production was handled by Marcel Botezan and Sebastian Barac. Musically, "Call the Police" is a "typical" Eurodance song which musically incorporates "Romanian music dance vibe".

Music critics were positive towards "Call the Police", noting the track as being catchy and comparing it to band member Inna's works. For promotion, an accompanying music video for the single was shot by Roman Burlaca at Palatul Noblesse. Commercially, "Call the Police" experienced moderate success on music charts; while it peaked at number six on Poland's Airplay Top 100, the track reached position 64 in Romania.

== Background and release ==
G Girls was a four-part girl band started by label Global Records, consisting of Romanian singers Alexandra Stan, Antonia, Inna and Lori; the latter previously participated at Romanian reality singing competition Vocea României. "Call the Police" was written by Eric Turner and Julimar Santos Oliveira Neponunceno, while the production process was handled by Marcel Botezan and Sebastian Barac. On 14 June 2016, the recording was distributed in multiple regions through Global and Roton, while being made available for purchase in Italy on 15 July 2016 by Ego. At the time of the track's premiere, Stan and Antonia were promoting "Écoute" and "Sună-mă", respectively, and Inna would release "Heaven".

== Composition and reception ==
"Call the Police"
A 17-second sample of "Call the Police", a Eurodance song with a "Romanian music dance vibe".

According to magazine Beebee, the recording is a "typical" Eurodance track which musically incorporates "Romanian music dance vibe" in its composition. Jonali particularly called the single a "club-ready summer jam" and an "infectiously island-infused groove". Iko, writing for magazine Beebee, described the release of the single and the forming of the "hottest girl group out there" a surprise, while comparing the track to Inna's works. He further noted the band's commercial appeal, with him praising the accompanying music video for "Call the Police".

Jonali from his own music website named the song's hooks as being catchy, pointing out its refrain, "Somebody better call the police on me, somebody better call the police"; he also drew comparisons to Inna. Japanese portal TV Groove saw the single as an "exquisite catchy club tune that is perfect for summer, packed with an addictive island groove". MuuMuse's Bradley Stern included "Call the Police" in his list of July 2016's best releases. Upon its release, "Call the Police" experienced moderate success on record charts. It reached a peak position at number six and five on Poland's Airplay Chart and Dance Top 50, respectively. In native Romania, the single debuted at number 64 on the Airplay 100 on the week ending 24 July 2016; the single also claimed the same position in its second and last week on the chart.

== Music video ==
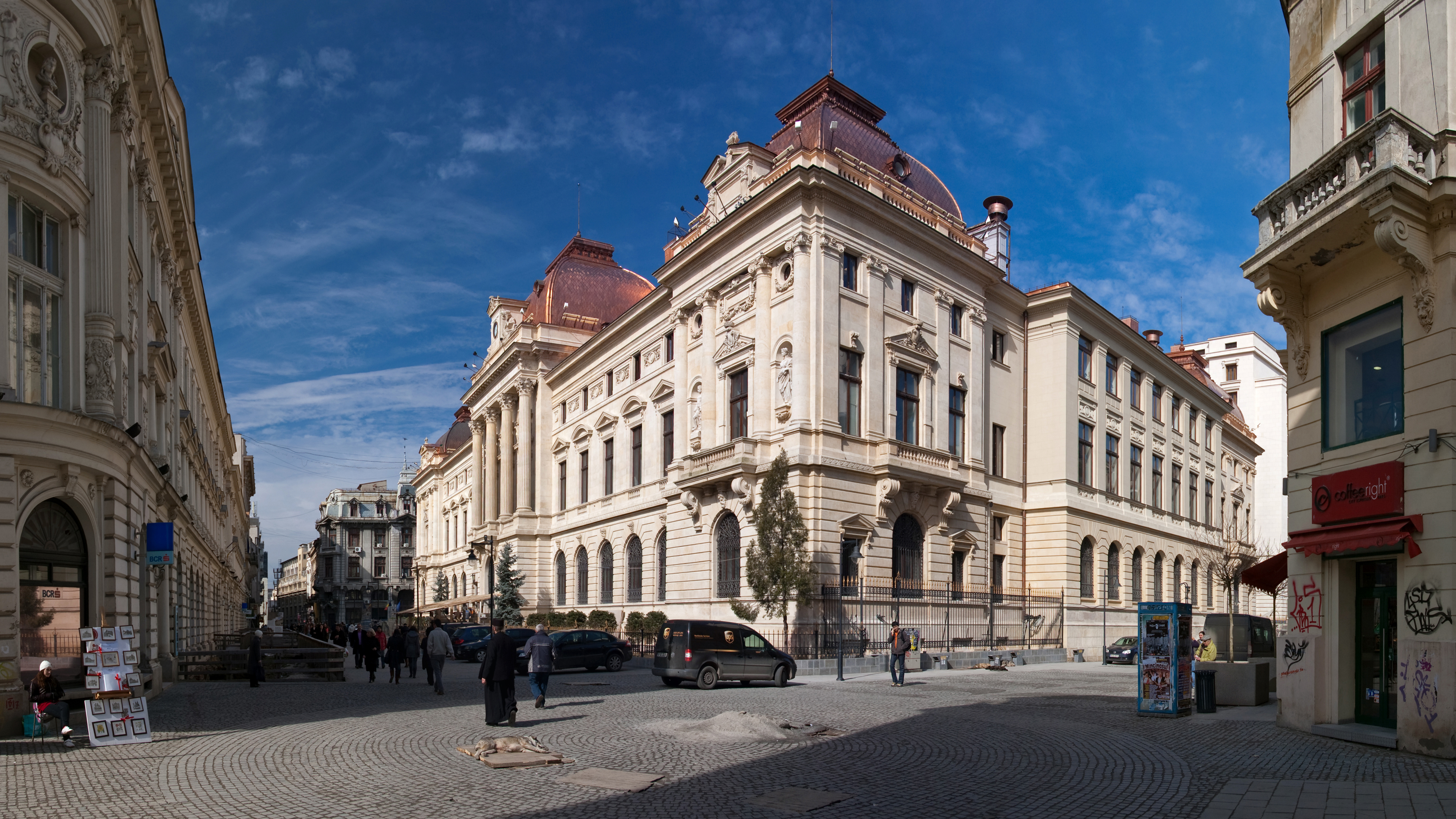
The accompanying music video for "Call the Police" was shot by Roman Burlaca in Bucharest. (pictured)

An accompanying video for the song was shot by Roman Burlaca at Palatul Noblesse in Bucharest, and was uploaded onto the YouTube channel of label Global Records on 1 June 2016. Marius Panduru served as the director of photography, while make-up was managed by Tania Cozma, Andra Manea and Dana Pertina, and hair styling by Alex Ifimov and Sorin Stratulat.

The video commences with Inna and Antonia entering the building after nodding to each other. Afterwards, the latter walks to a hall full of partying people while taking and developing photographs. Meanwhile, Inna is shown sitting on a mask-designed chair surrounded by males in tie in a white room. Stan, dressed in red lingerie, is displayed with a man which she later ties up to a chair in the video and steals his money. Fellow band member Lori then walks in a neon-green room where both lesbian and gay couples are shown kissing, with the latter being portrayed in a bathtub letting a glass of water falling on one's body. She subsequently writes "911" on a mirror, and all the band members are shown dressing neon and sparkling outfits in order to be visible in the dark. After Lori mixes up some pink drinks, the visual ends with them walking out of the building while throwing all the frames that were taken by Antonia in the beginning on the floor. Scenes interspersed through the main video show the band performing to the track close to each other in light or dark places.

== Track listing ==
Digital download / streaming

1. "Call the Police" – 3:08

== Credits and personnel ==
Credits adapted from Top Românesc.

Vocal and technical credits

- G Girls – vocals
  - Alexandra Stan – main vocals
  - Antonia – main vocals
  - Inna – main vocals
  - Lori – main vocals
- Sebastian Barac – producer
- Marcel Botezan – producer
- Julimar Santos Oliveira Neponunceno – songwriter
- Eric Turner – songwriter

Visual credits

- Roman Burlaca – director
- Tania Cozma – make-up
- Alex Ifimov – hair styling
- Andra Manea – make-up
- Sorin Stratulat – hair styling
- Marius Panduru – director of photography
- Dana Pertina – make-up

== Charts ==
Chart (2016)	Peak position
Poland Airplay (ZPAV)	6
Poland Dance (ZPAV)	5
Poland (Polish TV Airplay Chart)	2
Romania (Airplay 100)	64

== Release history ==
Release dates and formats for "Call the Police"
Region	Date	Format(s)	Label(s)	Ref.
Denmark	14 June 2016	Digital download; streaming	Global; Roton	
Germany	14 June 2016	Digital download; streaming	Global; Roton	
Romania	14 June 2016	Digital download; streaming	Global; Roton	
United Kingdom	14 June 2016	Digital download; streaming	Global; Roton	
United States	14 June 2016	Digital download; streaming	Global; Roton	
Italy	15 July 2016	Digital download; streaming	Ego	
Italy	15 July 2016	Radio airplay	Ego	
