= G Girls =

Romanian supergroup

- From left to right, clockwise: past member Alexandra Stan, and current members Lori, Inna and Antonia on the cover artwork of "Call the Police".

Background information
- Origin: Romania
- Genres: Eurodance
- Years active: 2016–2017
- Label: Global
- Past members: Alexandra Stan; Antonia; Inna; Lariss; Lori

G Girls was a Romanian girl supergroup, which was created by their label Global Records. It initially consisted of Inna, Antonia, Loredana Ciobotaru (Lori) and Alexandra Stan; who later departed and was replaced with Lariss. The group experienced commercial success with their debut single, "Call the Police" (2016), which peaked at number six in Poland.

== History ==
G Girls started in 2016 through the suggestion of record label Global Records. For their debut single, "Call the Police" (2016), the group consisted of Inna, Alexandra Stan, Antonia, and Lori. The song was commercially successful, peaking at number 64 on Romania's Airplay 100 and at number six in Poland. The band released the music video for their second single, "Milk & Honey", on 3 March 2017. Stan was replaced with Romanian singer Lariss. The song peaked at number 67 in their native country.

== Discography ==
=== Singles ===
List of singles, with selected chart positions
Title	Year	Peak chart positions		
Title	Year	ROM	POL	POL Dance
"Call the Police"	2016	64	6	5
"Milk & Honey"	2017	67	—	—
"—" denotes a title that did not chart, or was not released in that territory.
