= Antonia Iacobescu =

Romanian singer (born 1989)

Antonia
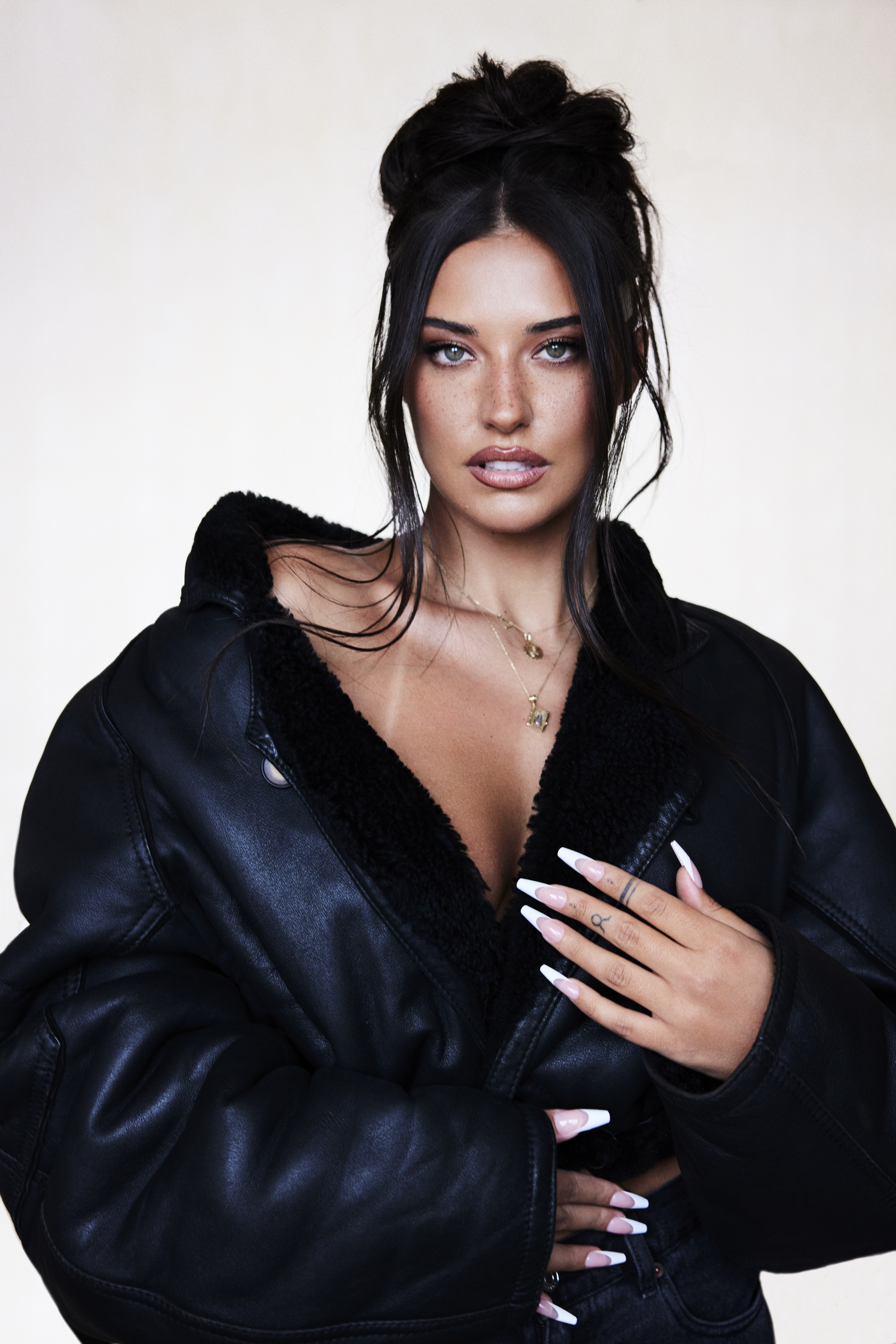
- Antonia in 2021
- Born: Antonia Clara Iacobescu; 12 April 1989 (age 37); Bucharest, Romania
- Occupations: Singer; model
- Years active: 2009–present
- Spouse: Vincenzo Castellano (m. 2011; div. 2020)
- Partner: Alex Velea
- Children: 3
- Musical career
- Genres: Popcorn; Dance-pop; EDM; house; Latin pop
- Instrument: Vocals
- Labels: MediaPro Music; Roton; Global
- Website: www.antoniaofficial.com

Antonia Clara Iacobescu (born 12 April 1989), known professionally as Antonia, is a Romanian singer.

== Early life ==
Antonia Clara Iacobescu was born on 12 April 1989 in Bucharest, Romania and moved with family to the United States at the age of five. She spent her childhood in Utah, singing at the age of ten, and American culture strongly influenced her musical style. She finished high school in Las Vegas, Nevada and entered the modelling world.

Iacobescu has participated in hundreds of photoshoots for catalogues and has collaborated with American agencies such as Lenz and Ford Models. In 2013, she launched her clothing line called MOJA. At the age of 18, Antonia returned to Romania with her family.

== Career ==
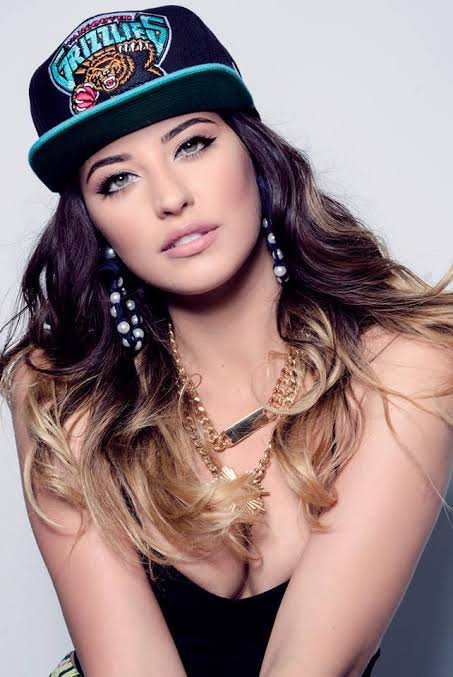
Antonia in 2012

In 2009, she met the Romanian producer Tom Boxer through a friend who had heard her singing. After the two met, Antonia and Tom created their first song known as "Roses on Fire". They also created a music video for the song, directed and filmed by Boxer.

In 2011, she released a single entitled "Pleacă" with the Vunk band. In mid-summer of 2012, Antonia released the promotional song "I got you" and the single "Jameia", the latter reaching 5th place in Romania. After the birth of her first child, Antonia returned to music as a solo singer. She released "Marionette", written by the Dutch producer and Afrojack.

In 2014, she participated as a judge in the TV show Kids Sing, broadcast by Kanal D. On 17 April 2015, Antonia released her debut album This Is Antonia through the Romanian record label Roton. The album contains 12 tracks and is available in physical and digital format. In 2017 Antonia participated with Alex Velea as contestants in the show Look Who's Dancing on Pro TV. Also, in 2017 and 2018, she was on the jury of the television show The Four, broadcast by Antena 1.

The artist was also chosen, because of her notoriety, to dub Janette's Romanian voice in Alvin and the Chipmunks: The Road Chip.

== Personal life ==
Antonia married Italian businessman Vincenzo Castellano in 2011, and they have a daughter together, Maya Rosario Castellano (born 2010). The two separated in 2013 and were in the process of divorcing, which ended in 2020. In 2013, Antonia started a relationship with Romanian singer Alex Velea, with whom she has two children, Dominic (born 2014) and Akim (born 2016). The two announced their engagement in July 2021.

Antonia is deeply religious. Before she married Castellano, she was a member of the The Church of Jesus Christ of Latter-day Saints and was committed to the conservative faith, which forbids alcohol, coffee, and smoking. However, due to the Mormon Church's prohibition on inter-faith marriages, when she married Castellano, she was excluded from the Church. According to a Mormon priest that knew Antonia, it was not just Antonia's marriage to a Catholic that was controversial. The Church also found her risqué approach to modesty and her often erotic presentation in modelling and music videos problematic:

"It's a great pity what she did, and that she posed naked and that she married a Catholic man. If she married a Catholic, The Church of Jesus Christ of Latter-day Saints no longer recognizes her."

Subsequently, Antonia has converted to Roman Catholicism, even baptizing her daughter Maya in that faith. She remains a devout Christian. Her current husband, Velea, is also a practicing Christian.

== Discography ==
=== Albums ===
Title	Details
This Is Antonia	Released: 17 April 2015; Label: Roton; Format: CD, Digital download

=== Singles ===
==== As lead artist ====
List of singles, with selected chart positions
Song	Year	Peak chart positions				Album
Song	Year	ROM (Note: Airplay 100 replaced the Romanian Top 100 in 2012 after the latter chart ceased its weekly issuing. However, the Airplay 100 was itself cancelled in 2021, and Billboard's Romania Songs chart inaugurated in 2022 is thus taken into consideration for Romanian peaks.)	BUL	MDA	POL	Album
"Shake It Mamma" (Note: The song was originally credited to both Tom Boxer and Antonia. However, when the music video was published, the song was only credited to Antonia. This further applies to the digital release of the song.)	2010	26	—	—	—	This is Antonia
"Marionette"	2011	15	—	—	—	This is Antonia
"Jameia"	2012	5	23	—	—	This is Antonia
"Marabou"	2013	1	1	9	—	This is Antonia
"Hurricane" (solo or featuring Puya)	2013	8	8	—	—	This is Antonia
"Wild Horses" (Note: A remix EP of the song titled "Wild Wild Horses" which additionally credits Lotus as a main artist and features Pitbull was released in 2018.) (featuring Jay Sean)	2014	31	—	—	—	This is Antonia
"Chica Loca"	2015	34	—	—	—	This is Antonia
"Greșesc" (Note: The exact release date of "Greșesc" is unknown. While the digital release of the song is 18 February 2016, it was present in the Airplay 100 in June 2015.)	2015	53	—	—	—	Non-album singles
"Dream About My Face"	2015	—	—	—	—	Non-album singles
"Vorbește lumea"	2016	—	—	—	—	Non-album singles
"Sună-mă" (featuring Carla's Dreams)	2016	28	—	—	—	Ngoc
"Get Up and Dance" (featuring Achi)	2016	89	—	—	—	Non-album singles
"Dor de tine"	2017	30	—	—	—	Non-album singles
"Iubirea mea"	2017	45	—	—	—	Non-album singles
"Amya"	2017	—	—	—	—	Non-album singles
"Adio" (featuring Connect-R)	2018	—	—	—	—	Non-album singles
"Tango"	2018	72	—	—	—	Non-album singles
"Hotel Lounge"	2018	59	—	—	—	Non-album singles
"Mátame" (featuring Erik Frank)	2018	2	—	—	—	Non-album singles
"Touch Me"	2019	49	—	—	—	Non-album singles
"Lie I Tell Myself"	2020	79	—	—	—	Non-album singles
"Como ¡Ay!"	2020	94	—	—	—	Non-album singles
"Rebound"	2020	24	—	—	—	Non-album singles
"Taifun" (solo or with Toto H) (Note: The version with Toto H is titled "Typhoon" and is sung in English and Bulgarian.)	2021	—	—	—	—	Non-album singles
"Dinero" (with Yoss Bones)	2021	41	—	—	—	Non-album singles
"Îmi placi tu"	2021	57	—	—	—	Non-album singles
"I Think I Love Him"	2021	—	—	—	—	Non-album singles
"Benny Hana" (with Pitt Leffer and Guilty Pleasure)	2021	72	—	—	—	Non-album singles
"Amor"	2021	—	—	—	—	Non-album singles
"Complicated" (with Arkanian)	2022	20	—	—	—	Non-album singles
"Una Favela" (with Qodës)	2022	—	—	—	—	Non-album singles
"Send Me Your Love" (with Gromee)	2022	—	—	—	5	Tiny Sparks
"Tranquilo Papi" (with Alex Velea)	2022	—	—	—	—	Non-album single
"Clap Clap" (with Gran Error and Elvana Gjata)	2022	—	—	—	32	Non-album single
"—" denotes a recording that did not chart or was not released in that territory.

==== As featured artist ====
List of singles as featured artist, with selected chart positions
Song	Year	Peak chart positions							Album
Song	Year	ROM	BUL	CIS	ISR	MDA	GRE	POL	Album
"Roses on Fire" (Pink Room featuring Antonia) (Note: On Morena, the song is credited as Tom Boxer featuring Antonia and Pink Room.)	2009	—	—	—	—	—	—	—	Morena
"Morena" (Tom Boxer featuring Antonia)	2009	2	3	50	20	—	69	1	This is Antonia / Morena
"Pleacă" (Vunk featuring Antonia)	2011	1	—	—	—	9	—	—	Non-album single
"Întoarce-te acasă" (Holograf featuring Antonia)	2014	13	—	—	—	—	—	—	Life Line
"Fie ce-o fi" (Dara featuring Inna, Antonia & Carla's Dreams)	2014	55	—	—	—	4	—	—	Non-album singles
"El Amor" (Micke featuring Antonia)	2017	—	—	—	—	—	—	—	Non-album singles
"Sahara" (Alex Velea featuring Antonia & Lino Golden)	2018	—	—	—	—	—	—	—	Non-album singles
"Anxietate" (Carla's Dreams featuring Antonia)	2019	—	—	—	—	—	—	—	Non-album singles
"Trika Trika" (Faydee featuring Antonia)	2019	3	9	—	—	—	—	—	Non-album singles
"—" denotes a recording that did not chart or was not released in that territory.

==== Promotional singles ====
List of promotional singles, with selected chart positions
Song	Year	Peak chart positions	Album
Song	Year	ROM	Album
"I Got You"	2012	—	This is Antonia
"Hawaii" (Note: Also known as "Nu stau în Hawaii" during its release. On This is Antonia, the song is merely titled "Hawaii".)	2013	89	This is Antonia
"În oglindă"	2019	—	Non-album singles
"Muți"	2020	—	Non-album singles
"Take Me Somewhere" (with Avalan)	2021	—	Non-album singles
"—" denotes a recording that did not chart or was not released in that territory.

==== Other singles ====
List of other singles, with selected chart positions
Song	Year	Peak chart positions		Album
Song	Year	ROM	POL	Album
"Santa Baby" (Note: A cover of the original song performed by Eartha Kitt and Henri René and His Orchestra.)	2011	—	—	Non-album singles
"The Christmas Song" (Note: A cover of the original song written by Robert Wells and Mel Tormé.)	2011	—	—	Non-album singles
"Iarăși e Crăciunul" (as part of Kiss FM All Stars)	2014	—	—	Non-album singles
"Call the Police" (as part of G Girls)	2016	64	6	Non-album singles
"Milk & Honey" (as part of G Girls)	2017	67	—	Non-album singles
"Poveste de Crăciun" (as part of Kiss FM All Stars)	2017	—	—	Non-album singles
"A venit Crăciunul" (as part of Kiss FM All Stars)	2020	—	—	Non-album singles
"—" denotes a recording that did not chart or was not released in that territory.

==== Guest appearances ====
List of guest appearances
Title	Year	Album
"The Game" (Tom Boxer featuring Antonia)	2010	Morena
"Feel the Joy" (Tom Boxer featuring Antonia)	2010	Morena
