= Poni (singer) =

Albanian singer (born 1981)

- Born: Shqiponja Karafilaj; 8 November 1981; Vlorë, PSR Albania
- Years active: 2000–present
- Notable work: Dashuria Labe, Dale moj dale, Si trëndafil
- Children: 1
- Musical career
- Genre: pop folk
- Occupation: singer
- Instruments: vocals

Shqiponja Karafilaj (born 8 November 1981), known professionally as Poni, is an Albanian singer and songwriter, noted for her contributions to Albanian pop and folk-inspired music. Active since the early 2000s, she is recognized as one of the most popular performers of contemporary Albanian folk music, distinguished for her expressive vocals, incorporating traditional musical elements into modern compositions.

== Early life and education ==
Shqiponja Karafilaj was born in Vlorë, People's Socialist Republic of Albania. She developed an interest in singing at a young age and later began performing professionally, drawing inspiration from southern Albanian folk traditions, particularly those of the Labëria region. Her childhood nickname, "Poni", later became her permanent stage name.

She studied singing at the music school "Naim Frashëri" in her hometown, while also participating in artistic activities at the local “Petro Marko” theatre. Her first stage appearance was at the "Vlora Song Festival", when she was still a student. For two years, she worked as a music teacher.

Aside from her music career, Poni pursued her higher education by graduating in political science from Marin Barleti University.

== Career ==
Poni began her professional career in the early 2000s and gradually achieved nationwide popularity through televised music events, concerts and festival appearances. Her debut album, As Po As Jo, was released in 2005, followed by a series of albums that confirmed her place in Albanian pop-folk music.

She gained wide acclaim through her participation at the fourth edition of Top Fest, in 2007, where she performed the popular ballad "Si trëndafil", which won the Internet Prize as the most voted song by the public. In 2012, she won First Prize at the folk music festival Nota Fest in Skopje, with the song "Është e jona Shqipëria".

That same year, at the Albanian music video awards, Netët e Klipit Shqiptar, she received the award for Best Folk Music Video for the clip accompanying the song "Fjala ime është kënga".

Over the years, she continued to appear on Albanian television programmes, live stages and concert tours across the country and the Albanian-speaking diaspora.

Poni's music is characterised by a synthesis of pop melodies combined with folk elements.

== Discography ==
=== Albums ===
Year	Title
2005	As Po As Jo
2006	Dashuria Labe
2008	Shpirtin kam tek ju
2010	Fjala ime është kënga
2013	Xhan Xhan!
2015	Bio
2019	Identitet

=== Singles ===
Year	Song
2006	"Dashuria Labe"
2006	"Dil moj dil"
2007	"Si trëndafil"
2008	"Hopa Hopa"
2008	"Labëri moj Labëri"
2010	"Fjala ime është kënga"
2010	"Vjosa, lumi im i këngës"
2013	"Xhan Xhan"
2013	"Bëja fora"
2013	"Dale Dale"
2013	"Ç’janë ato lastare"
2013	"Çokollata"
2013	"Unë jam n’Labëri"
2015	"Më dhe emrin nënë"
2015	"Ishim ne"
2015	"Diamanti i Vlorës"
2015	"Fol shqip"
2015	"Të ndarë"
2015	"Jemi një"
2015	"Zemra bam"
2015	"Kolazh dasme"
2019	"Nuse mirësevjen"
2019	"Vallëzo me mua"
2019	"Kolazh 1"
2019	"Ja e marr nga Vlora"
2019	"Njësoj"
2019	"Kolazh 2"
