= X Factor (Italian TV series) season 9 =

X Factor
- Season 9
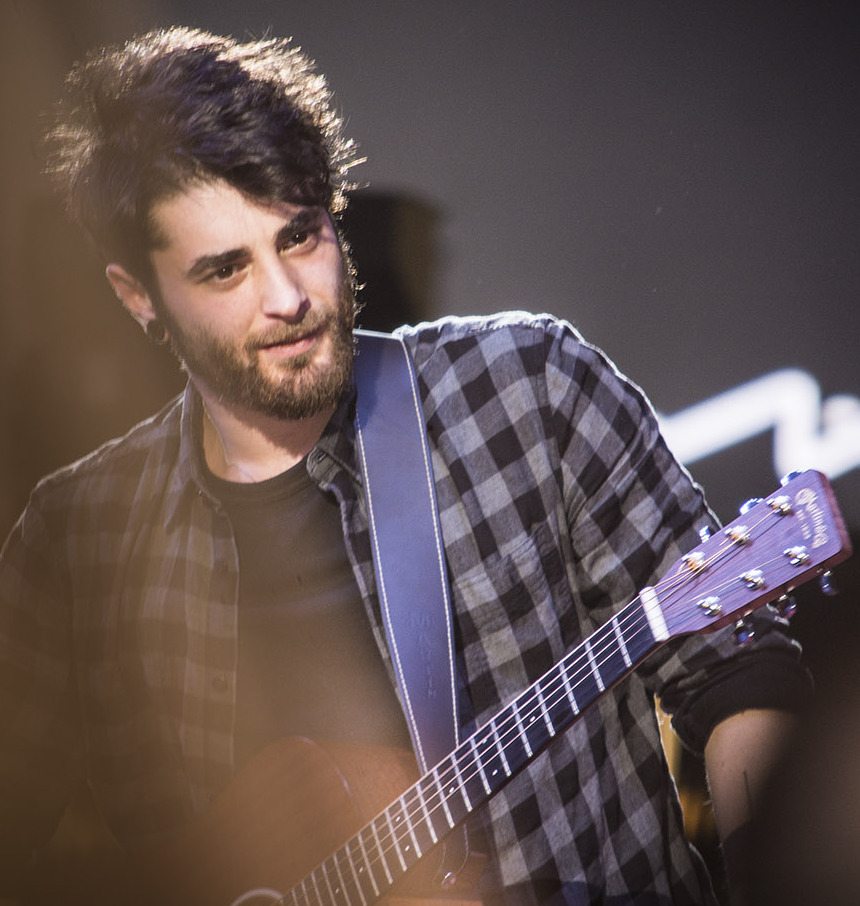
- Hosted by: Alessandro Cattelan (Sky Uno)
- Judges: Elio; Mika; Skin; Fedez
- Winner: Giosada
- Winning mentor: Elio
- Runner-up: Urban Strangers

Release
- Original network: Sky Uno; Cielo
- Original release: 10 September – 10 December 2015

Season chronology
- ← Previous; Season 8 Next → Season 10

X Factor is an Italian television music competition to find new singing talent; the winner was Giò Sada: he received a € 300,000 recording contract with Sony Music. Fedez and Mika would be confirmed as judges and mentors, while Skin and Elio have been chosen for replacing Morgan and Victoria Cabello in the role; also Alessandro Cattelan returned as host. The ninth season has been airing on Sky Uno since 10 September 2015.

== Judges' houses ==
The "Home Visit" is the final phase before the Live Shows. In this phase, the contestants who passed the Bootcamp had to perform one last time in front of their specific judge, in four different locations. At the end of this audition, the top twelve contestants were chosen.

The twelve eliminated acts were:

- Boys: Marco Gori, Angel Gabriel Marmolejos, Cranio Randagio
- Girls: Gaia Albertazzi, Martina Galli, Selene Capitanucci
- 25+: David Aiyeniwon, Diego Esposito, Marco Sbarbati
- Groups: Iron Mais, Street Chords, OSC2X

== Contestants and categories ==
Key:

– Winner
– Runner-up
– Third place

Category (mentor)	Acts		
Boys (Mika)	Eva	Leonardo Marius Dragusin	Luca Valenti
Girls (Skin)	Eleonora Anania	Margherita Principi	Enrica Tara
25+ (Elio)	Massimiliano D'Alessandro	Giosada	Davide Sciortino
Groups (Fedez)	Landlord	Moseek	Urban Strangers

== Live shows ==
=== Results summary ===
The number of votes received by each act were released by Sky Italia after the final.

Colour key

–	Contestant was in the bottom two/three and had to sing again in the final showdown
–	Contestant was in the bottom three but received the fewest votes and was immediately eliminated
–	Contestant received the fewest public votes and was immediately eliminated (no final showdown)
–	Contestant received the most public votes
–	Contestant was in the bottom four (only for Week 2) and had to sing again at the showdown which determined the final bottom two

Weekly results per contestant
Contestant	Week 1		Week 2			Week 3		Week 4		Week 5		Quarter-Final		Semi-Final		Final		
Contestant	Part 1	Part 2	Part 1	Part 2	Part 3	Part 1	Part 2	Part 1	Part 2	Round 1	Round 2	Round 1	Round 2	Round 1	Round 2	Round 1	Round 2	Round 3
Giosada	—N/a	3rd 14.02%	1st 24.35%	—N/a	—N/a	—N/a	2nd 20.14%	—N/a	2nd 28.40%	6th 11.61%	6th 13.48%	1st 23.94%	1st 26.33%	1st 30.59%	1st 32.72%	1st 38.31%	1st 41.01%	Winner; 52.66%
Urban Strangers	—N/a	1st 29.50%	—N/a	1st 39.28%	—N/a	—N/a	1st 38.04%	1st 31.57%	—N/a	1st 20.13%	1st 20.72%	2nd 23.53%	2nd 26.07%	2nd 23.94%	2nd 27.56%	2nd 29.86%	2nd 34.21%	Runner-up; 47.34%
Davide Sciortino	1st 24.49%	—N/a	—N/a	2nd 22.56%	—N/a	1st 26.97%	—N/a	3rd 17.81%	—N/a	5th 12.19%	2nd 15.06%	3rd 15.70%	4th 16.38%	4th 15.53%	3rd 19.99%	3rd 16.94%	3rd 24.78%	Eliminated (final)
Enrica Tara	5th 12.16%	—N/a	4th 15.53%	—N/a	—N/a	—N/a	3rd 15.38%	2nd 22.92%	—N/a	3rd 13.25%	5th 13.58%	6th 11.33%	—N/a	5th 13.94%	—N/a	4th 14.89%	Eliminated (final)	
Moseek	—N/a	5th 12.32%	3rd 16.71%	—N/a	—N/a	3rd 20.61%	—N/a	—N/a	1st 34.43%	2nd 13.26%	4th 14.13%	5th 12.19%	3rd 16.57%	3rd 15.99%	4th 19.72%	Eliminated (semi-final)		
Luca Valenti	3rd 18.46%	—N/a	2nd 20.86%	—N/a	—N/a	2nd 22.83%	—N/a	5th 12.69%	—N/a	4th 12.56%	3rd 14.25%	4th 13.31%	5th 14.65%	Eliminated (quarter-final)				
Landlord	4th 17.47%	—N/a	—N/a	3rd 15.77%	—N/a	4th 15.00%	—N/a	4th 15.01%	—N/a	7th 9.55%	7th 8.79%	Eliminated (Week 5)						
Leonardo Marius Dragusin	—N/a	4th 12.55%	—N/a	5th 10.21%	2nd 29.75%	—N/a	4th 14.19%	—N/a	3rd 19.31%	8th 7.45%	Eliminated (Week 5)							
Margherita Principi	2nd 20.43%	—N/a	—N/a	4th 12.18%	1st 33.45%	—N/a	5th 12.25%	—N/a	4th 17.86%	Eliminated (Week 4)								
Eleonora Anania	—N/a	2nd 19.59%	5th 15.03%	—N/a	3rd 21.10%	5th 14.59%	—N/a	Eliminated (Week 3)										
Eva	6th 6.99%	—N/a	6th 7.52%	—N/a	4th 15.70%	Eliminated (Week 2)												
Massimiliano D'Alessandro	—N/a	6th 12.02%	Eliminated (Week 1)															
Final showdown	Eva, Massimiliano D'Alessandro		Eleonora Anania, Eva			Eleonora Anania, Margherita Principi		Luca Valenti, Margherita Principi		Giosada, Landlord		Enrica Tara, Luca Vaelnti		Enrica Tara, Moseek		No final showdown or judges' vote: results will be based on public votes alone		
Judges' vote to eliminate																No final showdown or judges' vote: results will be based on public votes alone		
Elio's vote	Eva		Eva			Eleonora Anania		Margherita Principi		Landlord		Luca Valenti		Moseek		No final showdown or judges' vote: results will be based on public votes alone		
Fedez's vote	Massimiliano D'Alessandro		Eva			Eleonora Anania		Luca Valenti		Giosada		Enrica Tara		Enrica Tara		No final showdown or judges' vote: results will be based on public votes alone		
Mika's vote	Massimiliano D'Alessandro		Eleonora Anania			Eleonora Anania		Margherita Principi		Landlord		Enrica Tara		Enrica Tara		No final showdown or judges' vote: results will be based on public votes alone		
Skin's vote	Massimiliano D'Alessandro		Eva			Eleonora Anania		Luca Valenti		Landlord		Luca Valenti		Moseek		No final showdown or judges' vote: results will be based on public votes alone		
Eliminated	Massimiliano D'Alessandro; 3 of 4 votes majority		Eva; 3 of 4 votes majority			Eleonora Anania; 4 of 4 votes majority		Margherita Principi; Public vote to save		Leonardo Marius Dragusin; Public vote to save		Luca Valenti; Public vote to save		Moseek; Public vote to save		Enrica Tara; Public vote to save	Davide Sciortino; Public vote to save	Urban Strangers; Public vote to win
Eliminated	Massimiliano D'Alessandro; 3 of 4 votes majority		Eva; 3 of 4 votes majority			Eleonora Anania; 4 of 4 votes majority		Margherita Principi; Public vote to save		Landlord; 3 of 4 votes majority		Luca Valenti; Public vote to save		Moseek; Public vote to save		Enrica Tara; Public vote to save	Davide Sciortino; Public vote to save	Urban Strangers; Public vote to win

=== Live show details ===
==== Week 1 (22 October 2015) ====
- Celebrity performers: Duran Duran ("Pressure Off")

Contestants' performances on the first live show
Part 1
Act	Order	Song	Result
Enrica Tara	1	"Heaven"	Safe
Eva	2	"Per me è importante"	Bottom two
Davide Sciortino	3	"Play That Funky Music"	Safe
Landlord	4	"Iris"	Safe
Luca Valenti	5	"Stole the Show"	Safe
Margherita Principi	6	"Every Breath You Take"	Safe
Part 2
Act	Order	Song	Result
Eleonora Anania	7	"Dedicato"	Safe
Urban Strangers	8	"Cupid's Chokehold"	Safe
Leonardo Marius Dragusin	9	"Red"	Safe
Massimiliano D'Alessandro	10	"Terra mia"	Bottom two
Moseek	11	"Don't Wait"	Safe
Giosada	12	"The Real Me"	Safe
Final showdown details
Act	Order	Songs	Result
Eva	13	"Fix You"	Safe
Massimiliano D'Alessandro	14	"Am I Wrong"	Eliminated

Judges' votes to eliminate

- Mika: Massimiliano D'Alessandro – backed his own act, Eva.
- Elio: Eva – backed his own act, Massimiliano D'Alessandro.
- Skin: Massimiliano D'Alessandro – said that she preferred Eva.
- Fedez: Massimiliano D'Alessandro – thought that Eva was better suited for the show.

==== Week 2 (29 October 2015) ====
- Celebrity performers: Justin Bieber ("What Do You Mean?") and Francesca Michielin ("L'amore esiste" and "Lontano")

Contestants' performances on the second live show
Part 1
Act	Order	Song	Result
Moseek	1	"Time to Pretend"	Safe
Eleonora Anania	2	"Meravigliosa creatura"	Bottom two
Luca Valenti	3	"Blank Space"	Safe
Giosada	4	"Retrograde"	Safe
Eva	5	"Everybody's Changing"	Bottom two
Enrica Tara	6	"Like a Star"	Safe
Part 2
Act	Order	Song	Result
Davide Sciortino	7	"Quello che"	Safe
Leonardo Marius Dragusin	8	"Wake Me Up"	Bottom two
Landlord	9	"Habits"	Safe
Margherita Principi	10	"I Believe in You"	Bottom two
Urban Strangers	11	"Oceans"	Safe
Final showdown details
Act	Order	Songs	Result
Eleonora Anania	12	"Sally"	Bottom two
Eva	13	"Eppure sentire (Un senso di te)"	Eliminated
Leonardo Marius Dragusin	14	"All of Me"	Safe
Margherita Principi	15	"Summertime Sadness"	Safe

Judges' votes to eliminate

- Skin: Eva – backed her own act, Eleonora Anania.
- Mika: Eleonora Anania – backed his own act, Eva.
- Fedez: Eva – preferred Anania on the night.
- Elio: Eva – enhanced the uniqueness of Anania.

==== Week 3 (5 November 2015) ====
- Celebrity performers: Emma ("Arriverà l'amore")

Contestants' performances on the third live show
Part 1
Act	Order	Song	Result
Eleonora Anania	1	"Ma il cielo è sempre più blu"	Bottom two
Moseek	2	"The Passenger"	Safe
Luca Valenti	3	"Runnin' (Lose It All)"	Safe
Landlord	4	"Universo"	Safe
Davide Sciortino	5	"A Change Is Gonna Come"	Safe
Part 2
Act	Order	Song	Result
Urban Strangers	6	"Rape Me"	Safe
Enrica Tara	7	"I Try"	Safe
Giosada	8	"Love Me Two Times"	Safe
Leonardo Marius Dragusin	9	"Lay Me Down"	Safe
Margherita Principi	10	"Yellow Flicker Beat"	Bottom two
Final showdown details
Act	Order	Songs	Result
Eleonora Anania	11	"Con il nastro rosa"	Eliminated
Margherita Principi	12	"Addicted to You"	Safe

Judges' votes to eliminate

- Skin: Eleonora Anania – thought that Anania could go further in the competition.
- Mika: Eleonora Anania – said that he preferred Anania's voice.
- Fedez: Eleonora Anania – based on the final showdown performance.
- Elio was not required to vote as there was already a majority, but confirmed he would have eliminated Anania.

==== Week 4 (12 November 2015) ====
- Celebrity performers: 5 Seconds of Summer ("Hey Everybody!") and Giorgio Moroder

Contestants' performances on the fourth live show
Part 1
Act	Order	Song	Result
Enrica Tara	1	"Burnin' Up"	Safe
Davide Sciortino	2	"Things Can Only Get Better"	Safe
Urban Strangers	3	"Numb/Encore"	Safe
Luca Valenti	4	"Always on My Mind"	Bottom two
Landlord	5	"Promises"	Safe
Part 2
Act	Order	Song	Result
Margherita Principi	6	"Tainted Love"	Bottom two
Moseek	7	"Revolusion"	Safe
Leonardo Marius Dragusin	8	"Only You"	Safe
Giosada	9	"Girl U Want"	Safe
Final showdown details
Act	Order	Songs	Result
Luca Valenti	10	"Say Something"	Safe
Margherita Principi	11	"Hallelujah"	Eliminated

Judges' votes to eliminate

- Mika: Margherita Principi – backed his own act, Luca Valenti.
- Skin: Luca Valenti – backed her own act, Margherita Principi.
- Elio: Margherita Principi – based on the final showdown performance.
- Fedez: Luca Valenti – could not decide so chose to take it to deadlock.

With both acts receiving two votes each, the result went to deadlock and a new public vote commenced for 200 seconds. Margherita Principi was eliminated as the act with the fewest public votes.

==== Week 5 (19 November 2015) ====
Contestants' performances on the fifth live show
Round 1
Act	Order	Song	Result
Landlord	1	"Universo"	Safe
Davide Sciortino	2	"Iron Sky"	Safe
Leonardo Marius Dragusin	3	"Stay with Me"	Eliminated
Urban Strangers	4	"No Church in the Wild"	Safe
Enrica Tara	5	"Like a Star"	Safe
Giosada	6	"Retrograde"	Safe
Luca Valenti	7	"Take Me to Church"	Safe
Moseek	8	"The Passenger"	Safe
Round 2
Act	Order	Song	Result
Giosada	9	"Sex on Fire"	Bottom two
Luca Valenti	10	"All of the Stars"	Safe
Moseek	11	"Don't Speak"	Safe
Enrica Tara	12	"Are You Gonna Go My Way"	Safe
Davide Sciortino	13	"Vedrai vedrai"	Safe
Urban Strangers	14	"What I Got"	Safe
Landlord	15	"Metal & Dust"	Bottom two
Final showdown details
Act	Order	Songs	Result
Giosada	16	"Free Fallin'"	Safe
Landlord	17	"Youth"	Eliminated

Judge's vote to eliminate

- Fedez: Giosada – backed his own act, Landlord
- Elio: Landlord – backed his own act, Giosada
- Skin: Landlord – gave no reason.
- Mika: Landlord – gave no reason.

==== Week 6: Quarter-final (26 November 2015) ====
Contestants' performances on the sixth live show
Round 1
Act	Order	Song	Result
Davide Sciortino	1	"L'italiano"	Safe
Enrica Tara	2	"Adesso e qui"	Bottom two
Moseek	3	"Tutti i miei sbagli"	Safe
Giosada	4	"Amore che vieni, amore che vai"	Safe
Luca Valenti	5	"Ti scatterò una foto"	Safe
Urban Strangers	6	"La libertà"	Safe
Round 2
Act	Order	Song	Result
Moseek	7	"Do I Wanna Know?"	Safe
Luca Valenti	8	"Stitches"	Bottom two
Giosada	9	"Shock The Monkey"	Safe
Urban Strangers	10	"Loser"	Safe
Davide Sciortino	11	"Wildfire"	Safe
Final showdown details
Act	Order	Songs	Result
Enrica Tara	12	"One and Only"	Safe
Luca Valenti	13	"My Immortal"	Eliminated

Judges' votes to eliminate

- Mika: Enrica Tara – backed his own act, Luca Valenti.
- Skin: Luca Valenti – backed her own act, Enrica Tara.
- Elio: Luca Valenti – gave no reason
- Fedez: Enrica Tara – could not decide so chose to take it to deadlock.

With both acts receiving two votes each, the result went to deadlock and a new public vote commenced for 200 seconds. Luca Valenti was eliminated as the act with the fewest public votes.

==== Week 7: Semi-final (3 December 2015) ====
Contestants' performances on the seventh live show
Round 1
Act	Order	Song	Result
Moseek	1	"Elliott"	Safe
Giosada	2	"Il rimpianto di te"	Safe
Enrica Tara	3	"I Found You"	Bottom two
Urban Strangers	4	"Runaway"	Safe
Davide Sciortino	5	"My Soul Trigger"	Safe
Round 2
Act	Order	Song	Result
Davide Sciortino	6	"Can't Feel My Face"	Safe
Urban Strangers	7	"Pompeii"	Safe
Giosada	8	"Best Day of My Life"	Safe
Moseek	9	"Lean On"	Bottom two
Final showdown details
Act	Order	Songs	Result
Enrica Tara	10	"Something's Got a Hold on Me"	Safe
Moseek	11	"Somebody to Love"	Eliminated

Judge's vote to eliminate

- Fedez: Enrica Tara – backed his own act, Moseek.
- Skin: Moseek – backed her own act, Enrica Tara.
- Mika: Enrica Tara – gave no reason.
- Elio: Moseek – could not decide so chose to take it to deadlock.

With both acts receiving two votes each, the result went to deadlock and reverted to the earlier public vote. Moseek were eliminated as the act with the fewest public votes.

==== Week 8: Final (10 December 2015) ====
Contestants' performances on the final live show
Round 1
Act	Order	Song (Duet with Cesare Cremonini)	Result
Giosada	1	"Logico #1"	Safe
Davide Sciortino	2	"Mondo"	Safe
Enrica Tara	3	"La nuova stella di Broadway"	4th place
Urban Strangers	4	"Buon viaggio (Share the Love)"	Safe
Round 2
Act	Order	Song	Result
Davide Sciortino	5	"My Soul Trigger"	3rd place
Urban Strangers	6	"Runaway"	Safe
Giosada	7	"Il rimpianto di te"	Safe
Round 3
Act	Order	Song	Result
Giosada	8	"Best of You"	Winner
Urban Strangers	9	"Oceans"	Runner-up
