= X Factor (Italian TV series) =

Singing competition

- Created by: Simon Cowell
- Presented by: Francesco Facchinetti; Alessandro Cattelan; Ludovico Tersigni; Francesca Michielin; Giorgia
- Judges: Morgan; Mara Maionchi; Simona Ventura; Claudia Mori; Elio; Enrico Ruggeri; Anna Tatangelo; Arisa; Mika; Fedez; Victoria Cabello; Skin; Manuel Agnelli; Álvaro Soler; Levante; Asia Argento; Lodo Guenzi; Malika Ayane; Sfera Ebbasta; Samuel Romano; Emma; Hell Raton; Ambra Angiolini; Dargen D'Amico; Rkomi; Paola Iezzi; Jake La Furia; Achille Lauro; Francesco Gabbani; Irama
- Country of origin: Italy
- No. of seasons: 20
- No. of episodes: 212

Production
- Production companies: Fremantle Italia; Magnolia

Original release
- Network: Rai Due (2008–2010); Cielo (free-to-air, 2011–2015); Sky Uno/Sky Uno HD (2011–); TV8 (free-to-air, 2016–)
- Release: 10 March 2008 – present

X Factor Italia is an Italian television show and singing competition, based on the British TV programme The X Factor, and part of The X Factor franchise, created by Simon Cowell. The show's first series premiered on 10 March 2008 and was broadcast by Rai Due, but since its fifth series, launched on 20 October 2011, it moved to Sky Uno, becoming the first version of the franchise to be broadcast by a pay television channel.

Each series of the show sees amateur singers of all ages and backgrounds auditioning in front of a panel of judges, selected for their role in the Italian or international music industry. Through several selection stages, each judge chooses a set of singers to mentor. Selected singers later compete on live shows, with a public vote eliminating these contestants one by one, until the final winner is declared.

X Factor was initially presented by Francesco Facchinetti (series 1–series 4). Alessandro Cattelan was the show's presenter from series 5 to series 14, followed by Ludovico Tersigni (series 15), Francesca Michielin (series 16 and series 17) and Giorgia (series 18 and series 19).

The show launched the career of several popular Italian singers, including Giusy Ferreri (series 1), Noemi (series 2), Marco Mengoni (series 3), Francesca Michielin (series 5), Chiara Galiazzo and Mahmood (series 6), Michele Bravi (series 7), Lorenzo Fragola (series 8), Enrico Nigiotti and Måneskin (series 11).

== Judges and presenters ==
Color key

Presenter
Guest Presenter
Judge
Contestant

| Cast Member | Series | | | | | | | | | | | | | | | | | | | |
| Cast Member | 1 | 2 | 3 | 4 | 5 | 6 | 7 | 8 | 9 | 10 | 11 | 12 | 13 | 14 | 15 | 16 | 17 | 18 | 19 | 20 |
|---|---|---|---|---|---|---|---|---|---|---|---|---|---|---|---|---|---|---|---|---|
| Francesco Facchinetti | ● | ● | ● | ● | | | | | | | | | | | | | | | | |
| Alessandro Cattelan | | | | | ● | ● | ● | ● | ● | ● | ● | ● | ● | ● | | | | | | |
| Ludovico Tersigni | | | | | | | | | | | | | | | ● | | | | | |
| Francesca Michielin | | | | | ● | | | | | | | | | | | ● | ● | | | |
| Giorgia | | | | | | | | | | | | | | | | | | ● | ● | ● |
| Daniela Collu | | | | | | | | | | | | | | ●^{1} | | | | | | |
| Mara Maionchi | ● | ● | ● | ● | | | | | | | ● | ● | ● | | | | | | | |
| Morgan | ● | ● | ● | | ● | ● | ● | ● | | | | | | | | | ●^{2} | | | |
| Simona Ventura | ● | ● | | | ● | ● | ● | | | | | | | | | | | | | |
| Claudia Mori | | | ● | | | | | | | | | | | | | | | | | |
| Elio | | | | ● | ● | ● | ● | | ● | | | | | | | | | | | |
| Anna Tatangelo | | | | ● | | | | | | | | | | | | | | | | |
| Enrico Ruggeri | | | | ● | | | | | | | | | | | | | | | | |
| Arisa | | | | | ● | ● | | | | ● | | | | | | | | | | |
| Mika | | | | | | | ● | ● | ● | | | | | ● | ● | | | | | |
| Victoria Cabello | | | | | | | | ● | | | | | | | | | | | | |
| Fedez | | | | | | | | ● | ● | ● | ● | ● | | | | ● | ● | | | |
| Skin | | | | | | | | | ● | | | | | | | | | | | |
| Álvaro Soler | | | | | | | | | | ● | | | | | | | | | | |
| Manuel Agnelli | | | | | | | | | | ● | ● | ● | | ● | ● | | | ● | | |
| Levante | | | | | | | | | | | ● | | | | | | | | | |
| Asia Argento | | | | | | | | | | | | ●^{3} | | | | | | | | |
| Lodo Guenzi | | | | | | | | | | | | ●^{3} | | | | | | | | |
| Samuel | | | | | | | | | | | | | ● | | | | | | | |
| Malika Ayane | | | | | | | | | | | | | ● | | | | | | | |
| Sfera Ebbasta | | | | | | | | | | | | | ● | | | | | | | |
| Emma Marrone | | | | | | | | | | | | | | ● | ● | | | | | |
| Hell Raton | | | | | | | | | | | | | | ● | ● | | | | | |
| Rkomi | | | | | | | | | | | | | | | | ● | | | | |
| Dargen D'Amico | | | | | | | | | | | | | | | | ● | ● | | | |
| Ambra Angiolini | | | | | | | | | | | | | | | | ● | ● | | | |
| Paola Iezzi | | | | | | | | | | | | | | | | | | ● | ● | ● |
| Jake La Furia | | | | | | | | | | | | | | | | | | ● | ● | ● |
| Achille Lauro | | | | | | | | | | | | | | | | | | ● | ● | |
| Francesco Gabbani | | | | | | | | | | | | | | | | | | | ● | ● |
| Irama | | | | | | | | | | | | | | | | | | | | ● |

Annotations

- ^{1} Daniela Collu presented the second and third live show of X Factor series 14, replacing Alessandro Cattelan, who tested positive to COVID-19.
- ^{2} Morgan was fired after the fourth live show of the seventeenth series of X Factor for «inappropriate behaviors», and was not replaced by any other judge for the last three episodes of the show.
- ^{3} Asia Argento served as a judge on the pre-recorded selection stages of the twelfth series of X Factor, but was replaced by Lodo Guenzi for the live shows, following allegations that Argento sexually assaulted actor Jimmy Bennett.

== Series summary ==
- Act in Mara's Category
- Act in Morgan's Category
- Act in Simona's Category
- Act in Claudia's Category
- Act in Elio's Category
- Act in Enrico's Category
- Act in Arisa's Category
- Act in Mika's Category
- Act in Victoria's Category
- Act in Fedez's Category
- Act in Skin's Category
- Act in Álvaro's Category
- Act in Manuel's Category
- Act in Asia/Lodo's Category
- Act in Samuel's Category
- Act in Malika's Category
- Act in Sfera's Category
- Act in Emma's Category
- Act in Hell's Category
- Act in Ambra's Category
- Act in Dargen's Category
- Act in Rkomi's Category
- Act in Lauro's Category
- Act in Paola's Category
- Act in Jake's Category
- Act in Francesco's Category

| Season | Start | Finish | Winner | Runner-up | Third place | Fourth place | Winning mentor | Host | Judges (seating order) | | | |
|---|---|---|---|---|---|---|---|---|---|---|---|---|
| 1 | 10 March 2008 | 27 May 2008 | Aram Quartet; Groups | Giusy Ferreri; Over 25s | Emanuele Dabbono; Over 25s | Tony Maiello; 16-24s | Morgan | Francesco Facchinetti | Mara | Morgan | Simona | —N/a |
| 2 | 12 January 2009 | 19 April 2009 | Matteo Becucci; Over 25s | The Bastards Sons of Dioniso; Groups | Jury Magliolo; 16-24s | Daniele Magro; 16-24s | Morgan | Francesco Facchinetti | Mara | Morgan | Simona | —N/a |
| 3 | 10 September 2009 | 2 December 2009 | Marco Mengoni; 16-24s | Guilano Rassu; Over 25s | Yavanna; Groups | Silver; 16-24s | Morgan | Francesco Facchinetti | Mara | Morgan | Claudia | —N/a |
| 4 | 7 September 2010 | 23 November 2010 | Nathalie; Over 25s | Davide; Boys | Nevruz Joku; Over 25s | Kymera; Groups | Elio | Francesco Facchinetti | Elio | Mara | Anna | Enrico |
| 5 | 20 October 2011 | 6 January 2012 | Francesca Michielin; Girls | I Moderni; Groups | Antonella Lo Coco; Over 25s | Nicole Tuzzi; Girls | Simona Ventura | Alessandro Cattelan | Morgan | Arisa | Simona | Elio |
| 6 | 20 September 2012 | 7 December 2012 | Chiara Galiazzo; Over 25s | Ics; Over 25s | Davide Merlini; Boys | Cixi; Girls | Morgan | Alessandro Cattelan | Morgan | Simona | Arisa | Elio |
| 7 | 26 September 2013 | 12 December 2013 | Michele Bravi; Boys | Ape Escape; Groups | Violetta Zironi; Girls | Aba; Overs | Morgan | Alessandro Cattelan | Morgan | Simona | Mika | Elio |
| 8 | 18 September 2014 | 11 December 2014 | Lorenzo Fragola; Boys | Madh; Boys | Ilaria Rastrelli; Girls | Mario Gavino Garrucciu; Overs | Fedez | Alessandro Cattelan | Morgan | Victoria | Mika | Fedez |
| 9 | 10 September 2015 | 10 December 2015 | Giosada; Overs | Urban Strangers; Groups | Davide Shorty; Overs | Enrica Tara; Girls | Elio | Alessandro Cattelan | Elio | Skin | Mika | Fedez |
| 10 | 15 September 2016 | 15 December 2016 | Soul System; Groups | Gaia Gozzi; Girls | Eva Pevarello; Overs | Roshelle; Girls | Álvaro Soler | Alessandro Cattelan | Manuel | Arisa | Álvaro | Fedez |
| 11 | 14 September 2017 | 14 December 2017 | Lorenzo Licitra; Overs | Måneskin; Groups | Enrico Nigiotti; Overs | Samuel Storm; Boys | Mara Maionchi | Alessandro Cattelan | Manuel | Levante | Mara | Fedez |
| 12 | 6 September 2018 | 13 December 2018 | Anastasio; Boys | Naomi Rivieccio; Overs | Luna Melis; Girls | BowLand; Groups | Mara Maionchi | Alessandro Cattelan | Mara | Manuel | Asia | Fedez |
| 12 | 6 September 2018 | 13 December 2018 | Anastasio; Boys | Naomi Rivieccio; Overs | Luna Melis; Girls | BowLand; Groups | Mara Maionchi | Alessandro Cattelan | Manuel | Lodo | Mara | Fedez |
| 13 | 12 September 2019 | 12 December 2019 | Sofia Tornambene; Girls | Booda; Groups | Sierra; Groups | Davide Rossi; Boys | Sfera Ebbasta | Alessandro Cattelan | Sfera | Mara | Malika | Samuel |
| 14 | 17 September 2020 | 10 December 2020 | Casadilego; Girls | Little Pieces of Marmelade; Groups | Blind; Boys | N.A.I.P. Overs | Hell Raton | Alessandro Cattelan | Manuel | Emma | Mika | Hell |
| 15 | 16 September 2021 | 9 December 2021 | Baltimora | Gianmaria | Bengala Fire | Fellow | Hell Raton | Ludovico Tersigni | Manuel | Emma | Mika | Hell |
| 16 | 15 September 2022 | 8 December 2022 | Santi Francesi | Beatrice Quinta | Linda | Tropea | Rkomi | Francesca Michielin | Dargen | Ambra | Rkomi | Fedez |
| 17 | 14 September 2023 | 7 December 2023 | Sarafine | Stunt Pilots | II Solito Dandy | Maria Tomba | Fedez | Francesca Michielin | Dargen | Morgan | Ambra | Fedez |
| 18 | 12 September 2024 | 5 December 2024 | Mimì Caruso | Les Votives | I Patagarri | Lorenzo Salvetti | Manuel Agnelli | Giorgia | Manuel | Jake | Paola | Lauro |
| 19 | 11 September 2025 | 4 December 2025 | Rob | EroCaddeo | Delia Buglisi | PierC | Paola Iezzi | Giorgia | Francesco | Jake | Paola | Lauro |
| 20 | 10 September 2026 | 3 December 2026 | Current season | | | | | Giorgia | Francesco | Jake | Paola | Irama |

== Contestants, categories and judges ==
Key:

– Winning judge/category. Winners are in bold, eliminated contestants in small font.

| Series | Morgan | Simona Ventura | Mara Maionchi | N/A |
|---|---|---|---|---|
| One | **Groups**; **Aram Quartet**; Cluster; Sei Ottavi; 4 Sound; FM; Cherries | **25+** Giusy Ferreri; Emanuele Dabbono; Annalisa Baldi; Gino Scannapiego; Antonio Marino; Dante Pontone; Adriano De Pasquale | **16-24**; Tony Maiello; Ilaria Porceddu; Silvia Aprile; Luna Di Nardo; Vittoria Hyde; Maria Teresa d'Alise | N/A |
| Two | **25+** **Matteo Becucci**; Noemi; Laura Binda; Enrico Nordio; Chiarastella Calconi; Andrea Gioacchini; Elisa Rossi | **16-24**; Jury Magliolo; Daniele Magro; Ambra Marie Facchetti; Serena Abrami; Giacomo Salvietti | **Groups**; The Bastard Sons of Dioniso; Farias; Sisters of Soul; Sinacria Sinphony | N/A |
| Three | Morgan | Claudia Mori | Mara Maionchi | N/A |
| Three | **16-24**; **Marco Mengoni**; Silver; Chiara Ranieri; Cristiana Soriano; Mario Spada; Ornella Felicetti | **25+** Giuliano Rassu; Paola Canestrelli; Sofia; Damiano Fiorella; Francesca Ciampa; Francesco Gramegna | **Groups**; Yavanna; Luana Biz; A&K; Horrible Porno Stuntmen | N/A |
| Four | Enrico Ruggeri | Anna Tatangelo | Mara Maionchi | Elio |
| Four | **Groups**; Kymera; Effetto Doppler; Borghi Bros | **Girls**; Marika Lermani; Dorina Leka; Sofia Buconi; Alessandra Falconieri | **Boys**; Davide Mogavero; Stefano Filipponi; Ruggero Pasquarelli; Dami | **25+** **Nathalie Giannitrapani**; Nevruz Joku; Cassandra Raffaele; Manuela Zanier |
| Five | Morgan | Simona Ventura | Arisa | Elio |
| Five | **Boys**; Vincenzo Di Bella; Valerio De Rosa; Davide Papasidero | **Girls**; **Francesca Michielin**; Nicole Tuzii; Jessica Mazzoli | **25+** Antonella Lo Coco; Claudio Cera; Rahma Hafsi | **Groups**; I Moderni; Cafè Margot; Le 5 |
| Six | **25+** **Chiara Galiazzo**; Ics; Romina Falconi | **Boys**; Davide Merlini; Daniele Coletta; Alessandro Mahmoud; Nicola Aliotta | **Groups**; Frères Chaos; Le Donatella; Akmé | **Girls**; Cixi; Nice; Yendry Fiorentino |
| Seven | Morgan | Simona Ventura | Mika | Elio |
| Seven | **Boys**; **Michele Bravi**; Andrea D'Alessio; Lorenzo Iuracà | **Groups**; Ape Escape; Street Clerks; FreeBoys | **Girls**; Violetta Zironi; Gaia Galizia; Valentina Tioli; Roberta Pompa | **25+** Aba; Fabio Santini; Alan Scaffardi |
| Eight | Morgan | Fedez | Mika | Victoria Cabello |
| Eight | **Groups**; Komminuet; Spritz for Five; The Wise | **Boys**; **Lorenzo Fragola**; Madh; Leiner Riflessi; Riccardo Schiara | **25+** Mario Gavino Garrucciu; Emma Morton; Diluvio | **Girls**; Ilaria Rastrelli; Vivian Grillo; Camilla Andrea Magli |
| Nine | Skin | Fedez | Mika | Elio |
| Nine | **Girls**; Enrica Tara; Margherita Principi; Eleonora Anania | **Groups**; Urban Strangers; Moseek; Landlord | **Boys**; Luca Valenti; Leonardo Marius Dragusin; Eva | **25+** **Giosada**; Davide Sciortino; Massimiliano D'Alessandro |
| Ten | Álvaro Soler | Fedez | Arisa | Manuel Agnelli |
| Ten | **Groups**; **Soul System**; Daiana Lou; Les Enfants | **Girls**; Gaia Gozzi; Roshelle; Caterina Cropelli | **Boys**; Loomy; Fem; Diego Conti | **25+** Eva Pevarello; Andrea Biagioni; Silva Fortes |
| Eleven | Levante | Fedez | Mara Maionchi | Manuel Agnelli |
| Eleven | **Girls**; Rita Bellanza; Camille Cabaltera; Virginia Perbellini | **Boys**; Samuel Storm; Gabriele Esposito; Lorenzo Bonamano | **25+** **Lorenzo Licitra**; Enrico Nigiotti; Andrea Radice | **Groups**; Måneskin; Ros; Sem & Stenn |
| Twelve | Asia Argento/Lodo Guenzi | Fedez | Mara Maionchi | Manuel Agnelli |
| Twelve | **Groups**; BowLand; Seveso Casino Palace; Red Bricks Foundation | **25+** Naomi Rivieccio; Renza Castelli; Matteo Costanzo | **Boys**; **Anastasio**; Leo Gassman; Emanuele Bertelli | **Girls**; Luna Melis; Martina Attili; Sherol dos Santos |
| Thirteen | Samuel | Sfera Ebbasta | Mara Maionchi | Malika Ayane |
| Thirteen | **Groups**; Booda; Sierra; Seawards | **Girls**; **Sofia Tornambene**; Giordana Petralia; Mariam Rouass | **25+** Eugenio Campagna; Nicola Cavallaro; Marco Saltari | **Boys**; Davide Rossi; Lorenzo Rinaldi; Enrico Di Lauro |
| Fourteen | Mika | Hell Raton | Emma Marrone | Manuel Agnelli |
| Fourteen | **25+** N.A.I.P. Vergo; Eda Marì | **Girls**; **Casadilego**; Mydrama; Cmqmartina | **Boys**; Blind; Blue Phelix; Santi | **Groups**; Little Pieces of Marmelade; Melancholia; Manitoba |
| Fifteen | Fellow; Nika Paris; Westfalia | **Baltimora**; Versailles; Karakaz | Gianmaria; Le Endrigo; Vale LP | Bengala Fire; Erio; Mutonia |
| Sixteen | Dargen D'Amico | Fedez | Ambra Angiolini | Rkomi |
| Sixteen | Beatrice Quinta; Disco Club Paradiso; Matteo Orsi | Linda; Omini; Dadà | Tropea; Lucrezia; Matteo Siffredi | **Santi Francesi**; Joėlle; Iako |
| Seventeen | Morgan | Fedez | Ambra Angiolini | Dargen D'Amico |
| Seventeen | ~~Astromare~~; Sickteens; Selmi; Animaux Formidables | **Sarafine**; Maria Tomba; Asia | Angelica Bove; Astromare; Matteo Alieno; Gaetano De Caro | Stunt Pilots; Il Solito Dandy; Settembre |
| Eighteen | Achille Lauro | Jake La Furia | Paola Iezzi | Manuel Agnelli |
| Eighteen | I Patagarri; Les Votives; Lorenzo Salvetti | Francamente; The Foolz; El Ma | Lowrah; Pablo Murphy; Dimensione Brama | **Mimì Caruso**; Punkcake; Danielle |
| Nineteen | Achille Lauro | Jake La Furia | Paola Iezzi | Francesco Gabbani |
| Nineteen | EroCaddeo; Layana Oriot; Copper Jitters | Delia Buglisi; Tomasi; Amanda Bottini | **Rob**; Viscardi; Mayu Lucisano | PierC; Tellynonpiangere; Michelle Lufo |
| Twenty | Irama | Jake La Furia | Paola Iezzi | Francesco Gabbani |
| Twenty | Le Distanze; Patrizia Napolano; Lenanie | Alex Fontana; Alìa; Veronica Bruganelli | Mad-Dog; Camilla Guerini; Manù | Teo Bok; Giacomo Calò; Scraffs; Alice Fregoso |

== First season (2008) ==
In the first edition held in the period 10 March 2008 to 27 May 2008, Morgan's contestants (Vocal Groups) were labelled "pastel green contestants", Simona's contestants (25+ years) the "pink contestants" and Mara's (16–24 years) the "pastel blue contestants"

| | Week 1 | Week 2 | Week 3 | Week 4 | Week 5 | Week 6 | Week 7 | Week 8 | Week 9 | Week 10 | Week 11 | FINAL Week 12 | | |
|---|---|---|---|---|---|---|---|---|---|---|---|---|---|---|
| Aram Quartet | Safe | Safe | Safe | Safe | Safe | Safe | Safe | Safe | Safe | Safe | Safe | Safe | Safe | Winner (Week 12) |
| Giusy Ferreri | Not in competitions | | | | | | | Safe | Safe | Safe | Safe | Safe | Safe | Runner-up (Week 12) |
| Emanuele Dabbono | Safe | Safe | Bottom; Two | Bottom; Four | Safe | Safe | Safe | Bottom; Two | Bottom; Two | Safe | Safe | Safe | Bottom | Eliminated (Week 12) |
| Tony Maiello | Safe | Safe | Safe | Safe | Safe | Bottom; Two | Safe | Safe | Safe | Safe | Bottom; Two | Bottom | Eliminated (Week 12) | |
| Ilaria Porceddu | Safe | Bottom; Four | Safe | Safe | Safe | Safe | Safe | Safe | Safe | Bottom; Two | Bottom; Two | Eliminated (Week 11) | | |
| Cluster | Not in competitions | | | | | | | | Safe | Bottom; Two | Eliminated (Week 10) | | | |
| Sei Ottavi | Safe | Safe | Safe | Bottom; Four | Safe | Safe | Bottom; Two | Safe | Bottom; Two | Eliminated (Week 9) | | | | |
| Annalisa Baldi | Bottom; Six | Safe | Safe | Safe | Bottom; Two | Safe | Safe | Bottom; Two | Eliminated (Week 8) | | | | | |
| Gino Scannapiego | Not in competitions | | | | | Safe | Bottom; Two | Eliminated (Week 7) | | | | | | |
| Silvia Aprile | Not in competitions | | | Safe | Safe | Bottom; Two | Eliminated (Week 6) | | | | | | | |
| Antonio Marino | Safe | Safe | Safe | Safe | Bottom; Two | Eliminated (Week 5) | | | | | | | | |
| 4 Sound | Bottom; Six | Bottom; Four | Safe | Bottom; Four | Eliminated (Week 4) | | | | | | | | | |
| Dante Pontone | Safe | Safe | Safe | Bottom; Four | Eliminated (Week 4) | | | | | | | | | |
| FM | Safe | Safe | Bottom; Two | Eliminated (Week 3) | | | | | | | | | | |
| Luna Di Nardo | Safe | Bottom; Four | Eliminated (Week 2) | | | | | | | | | | | |
| Vittoria Hyde | Bottom; Six | Bottom; Four | Eliminated (Week 2) | | | | | | | | | | | |
| Maria Teresa d'Alise | Bottom; Six | Eliminated (Week 1) | | | | | | | | | | | | |
| Cherries | Bottom; Six | Eliminated (Week 1) | | | | | | | | | | | | |
| Adriano De Pasquale | Bottom; Six | Eliminated (Week 1) | | | | | | | | | | | | |
| Final Showdown | Adriano, Annalisa 4 Sound, Cherries M. Teresa, Vittoria | 4 Sound, Vittoria Ilaria, Luna | Emanuele, FM | Dante, Sei Ottavi 4 Sound, Emanuele | Annalisa, Antonio | Tony, Silvia | Gino, Sei Ottavi | Annalisa, Emanuele | Sei Ottavi, Emanuele | Cluster, Ilaria | Tony, Ilaria | No final shodown in last week | | |
| Simona's vote | Adriano | Vittoria Ilaria | FM | Sei Ottavi 4 Sound | Antonio | Silvia | Sei Ottavi | Annalisa | Emanuele | Cluster | Ilaria | No final shodown in last week | | |
| Morgan's vote | Cherries | Vittoria Luna | Emanuele | Dante Emanuele | Antonio | Tony | Gino | Emanuele | Sei Ottavi | Ilaria | Tony | No final shodown in last week | | |
| Mara's vote | M. Teresa | 4 Sound Luna | FM | Dante 4 Sound | Annalisa | Silvia | Gino | Annalisa | Sei Ottavi | Cluster | Ilaria | No final shodown in last week | | |
| Eliminates | Adriano; 1 of 1 Votes Cherries; 1 of 1 Votes M. Teresa; 1 of 1 Votes | Vittoria; 2 of 3 Votes Luna; 2 of 3 Votes | FM; 2 of 3 Votes | Dante; 2 of 3 Votes 4 Sound; 2 of 3 Votes | Antonio; 2 of 3 Votes | Silvia; 2 of 3 Votes | Gino; 2 of 3 Votes | Annalisa; 2 of 3 Votes | Sei Ottavi; 2 of 3 Votes | Cluster; 2 of 3 Votes | Ilaria; 2 of 3 Votes | Tony bottom | Emanuele bottom | Giusy; 42% Runner-up |
| Eliminates | Adriano; 1 of 1 Votes Cherries; 1 of 1 Votes M. Teresa; 1 of 1 Votes | Vittoria; 2 of 3 Votes Luna; 2 of 3 Votes | FM; 2 of 3 Votes | Dante; 2 of 3 Votes 4 Sound; 2 of 3 Votes | Antonio; 2 of 3 Votes | Silvia; 2 of 3 Votes | Gino; 2 of 3 Votes | Annalisa; 2 of 3 Votes | Sei Ottavi; 2 of 3 Votes | Cluster; 2 of 3 Votes | Ilaria; 2 of 3 Votes | Tony bottom | Emanuele bottom | Aram Quartet; 58% Winners |

== Second season (2008–2009) ==
The second season was held between 25 November 2008 and 19 April 2009. The three judges were the same as the first series line-up. Simona Ventura mentored the "16-24s", Morgan the "25 and Overs" and Mara Maionchi the Groups. The winner was Matteo Becucci from the 25 and over category.

| | Week 1 | Week 2 | Week 3 | Week 4 | Week 5 | Week 6 | Week 7 | Week 8 | Week 9 | Week 10 | Week 11 | Week 12 | Week 13 | FINAL Week 14 | |
|---|---|---|---|---|---|---|---|---|---|---|---|---|---|---|---|
| | Week 1 | Week 2 | Week 3 | Week 4 | Week 5 | Week 6 | Week 7 | Week 8 | Week 9 | Week 10 | Week 11 | Week 12 | Week 13 | Round 1 | Round 2 |
| Matteo Becucci | Safe | Safe | Safe | Safe | Safe | Safe | Safe | Safe | Safe | Safe | Safe | Safe | Safe | Safe | Winner (Final Week) |
| The Bastard Sons of Dioniso | Safe | Safe | Safe | Safe | Safe | Safe | Safe | Safe | Safe | Safe | Safe | Safe | Safe | Safe | Runner-up (Final Week) |
| Jury Magliolo | Not in competitions | | | | | Safe | Safe | Safe | Safe | Safe | Bottom; Two | Bottom; Two | Bottom; Two | Bottom | Eliminated (Final Week) |
| Daniele Magro | Safe | Safe | Safe | Safe | Safe | Bottom; Two | Safe | Bottom; Two | Safe | Safe | Safe | Safe | Bottom; Two | Eliminated (Week 13) | |
| Noemi | Safe | Safe | Safe | Safe | Safe | Safe | Bottom; Two | Safe | Safe | Bottom; Two | Safe | Bottom; Two | Eliminated (Week 12) | | |
| Laura Binda | Not in competitions | | | | | | | | | | Bottom; Two | Eliminated (Week 11) | | | |
| Enrico Nordio | Safe | Safe | Safe | Safe | Safe | Safe | Safe | Safe | Bottom; Two | Bottom; Two | Eliminated (Week 10) | | | | |
| Farias | Safe | Bottom; Two | Safe | Safe | Bottom; Two | Safe | Safe | Safe | Bottom; Two | Eliminated (Week 9) | | | | | |
| Chiarastella Calconi | Not in competitions | | | | | | | Bottom; Two | Eliminated (Week 8) | | | | | | |
| Andrea Gioacchini | Not in competitions | | | Safe | Safe | Safe | Bottom; Two | Eliminated (Week 7) | | | | | | | |
| Ambra Marie Facchetti | Safe | Safe | Bottom; Two | Safe | Safe | Bottom; Two | Eliminated (Week 6) | | | | | | | | |
| Sisters of Soul | Bottom; Two | Safe | Safe | Bottom; Two | Bottom; Two | Eliminated (Week 5) | | | | | | | | | |
| Serena Abrami | Safe | Safe | Safe | Bottom; Two | Eliminated (Week 4) | | | | | | | | | | |
| Giacomo Salvietti | Safe | Safe | Bottom; Two | Eliminated (Week 3) | | | | | | | | | | | |
| Elisa Rossi | Safe | Bottom; Two | Eliminated (Week 2) | | | | | | | | | | | | |
| Sinacria Sinphony | Bottom; Two | Eliminated (Week 1) | | | | | | | | | | | | | |
| Bottom Two | Sisters of Soul, Sinacria; Sinphony | Elisa, Farias | Ambra Marie, Giacomo | Sisters of Soul, Serena | Sisters of Soul, Farias | Daniele, Ambra Marie | Andrea, Noemi | Daniele, Chiarastella | Enrico, Farias | Enrico, Noemi | Laura, Jury | Noemi, Jury | Daniele, Jury | - | |
| Simona's vote | Sinacria; Sinphony | Elisa | - | Sisters of Soul | Sisters of Soul | Ambra; Marie | Andrea | Chiarastella | Farias | Enrico | Laura | Noemi | Daniele | - | |
| Morgan's vote | Sinacria; Sinphony | Farias | Giacomo | Serena | Farias | Daniele | Andrea | Daniele | Farias | - | Jury | Jury | Jury | - | |
| Mara's vote | - | Elisa | Giacomo | Serena | Sisters of Soul | Ambra; Marie | Noemi | Chiarastella | Enrico | Enrico | Laura | Noemi | Daniele | - | |
| Eliminates | Sinacria; Sinphony; 2 of 2 Votes | Elisa; 2 of 3 Votes | Giacomo; 2 of 2 Votes | Serena; 2 of 3 Votes | Sisters of Soul; 2 of 3 Votes | Ambra; Marie; 2 of 3 Votes | Andrea; 2 of 3 Votes | Chiarastella; 2 of 3 Votes | Farias; 2 of 3 Votes | Enrico; 2 of 2 Votes | Laura; 2 of 3 Votes | Noemi; 2 of 3 Votes | Daniele; 2 of 3 Votes | Jury bottom | The Bastard Sons of Dioniso; Runner-up |
| Eliminates | Sinacria; Sinphony; 2 of 2 Votes | Elisa; 2 of 3 Votes | Giacomo; 2 of 2 Votes | Serena; 2 of 3 Votes | Sisters of Soul; 2 of 3 Votes | Ambra; Marie; 2 of 3 Votes | Andrea; 2 of 3 Votes | Chiarastella; 2 of 3 Votes | Farias; 2 of 3 Votes | Enrico; 2 of 2 Votes | Laura; 2 of 3 Votes | Noemi; 2 of 3 Votes | Daniele; 2 of 3 Votes | Jury bottom | Matteo; Winner |

== Third season (2009) ==
In the third edition from 16 June 2009 until 2 December 2009, the judge Simona Ventura was replaced by Claudia Mori. Morgan's contestants (16–24 years) were dubbed the "blue contestants", Claudia Mori's contestants (25+ years) the "orange" and Mara Maionchi's category of the Vocal Groups, the "red contestants".

| | Week 1 | Week 2 | Week 3 | Week 4 | Week 5 | Week 6 | Week 7 | Week 8 | Week 9 | Week 10 | Week 11 | Week 12 | FINAL Week 13 | |
|---|---|---|---|---|---|---|---|---|---|---|---|---|---|---|
| | Week 1 | Week 2 | Week 3 | Week 4 | Week 5 | Week 6 | Week 7 | Week 8 | Week 9 | Week 10 | Week 11 | Week 12 | Round 1 | Round 2 |
| Marco Mengoni | Safe | Safe | Safe | Safe | Safe | Safe | Safe | Safe | Safe | Safe | Safe | Safe | Safe | Winner (Final Week) |
| Giuliano Rassu | Not in competitions | | | | | | | Safe | Safe | Safe | Safe | Safe | Safe | Runner-up (Final Week) |
| Yavanna | Safe | Bottom; Two | Safe | Safe | Safe | Bottom; Four | Safe | Bottom; Two | Safe | Safe | Bottom; Two | Bottom; Two | Bottom | Eliminated (Final Week) |
| Silver | Safe | Safe | Safe | Safe | Safe | Safe | Safe | Safe | Safe | Bottom; Two | Safe | Bottom; Two | Eliminated (Week 12) | |
| Paola Canestrelli | Not in competitions | | | | | | | | | Safe | Bottom; Two | Eliminated (Week 11) | | |
| Chiara Ranieri | Safe | Safe | Safe | Safe | Safe | Safe | Safe | Safe | Bottom; Two | Bottom; Two | Eliminated (Week 10) | | | |
| Sofia | Safe | Safe | Safe | Bottom; Two | Bottom; Two | Safe | Safe | Safe | Bottom; Two | Eliminated (Week 9) | | | | |
| Damiano Fiorella | Safe | Safe | Safe | Safe | Safe | Bottom; Four | Bottom; Two | Bottom; Two | Eliminated (Week 8) | | | | | |
| Cristiana Soriano | Not in competitions | | | | | Safe | Bottom; Two | Eliminated (Week 7) | | | | | | |
| Francesca Ciampa | Safe | Safe | Bottom; Two | Safe | Safe | Bottom; Four | Eliminated (Week 6) | | | | | | | |
| Luana Biz | Safe | Safe | Safe | Safe | Safe | Bottom; Four | Eliminated (Week 6) | | | | | | | |
| Mario Spada | Not in competitions | | | Safe | Bottom; Two | Eliminated (Week 5) | | | | | | | | |
| Ornella Felicetti | Safe | Safe | Safe | Bottom; Two | Eliminated (Week 4) | | | | | | | | | |
| A&K | Bottom; Two | Safe | Bottom; Two | Eliminated (Week 3) | | | | | | | | | | |
| Horrible Porno Stuntmen | Safe | Bottom; Two | Eliminated (Week 2) | | | | | | | | | | | |
| Francesco Gramegna | Bottom; Two | Eliminated (Week 1) | | | | | | | | | | | | |
| Bottom Two | A&K, Francesco | Yavanna, Horrible Porno; Stuntmen | A&K, Francesca | Ornella, Sofia | Sofia, Mario | Damiano, L. Biz Francesca, Yavanna | Cristiana, Damiano | Yavanna, Damiano | Chiara, Sofia | Chiara, Silver | Paola, Yavanna | Silver, Yavanna | | |
| Morgan's vote | --- | Horrible Porno; Stuntmen | - | Sofia | Sofia | L. Biz Francesca | Damiano | Damiano | Sofia | Chiara | Paola | Yavanna | - | |
| Claudia's vote | Francesco | Yavanna | A&K | Ornella | Mario | L. Biz Yavanna | Cristiana | Yavanna | Chiara | Silver | Yavanna | Silver | - | |
| Mara's vote | Francesco | Horrible Porno; Stuntmen | A&K | Ornella | Mario | Damiano Francesca | Cristiana | Damiano | Sofia | Chiara | Paola | Silver | - | |
| Eliminates | Francesco; 2 of 2 Votes | Horrible Porno; Stuntmen; 2 of 3 Votes | A&K; 2 of 2 Votes | Ornella; 2 of 3 Votes | Mario; 2 of 3 Votes | Luana Biz; 2 of 3 Votes | Cristiana; 2 of 3 Votes | Damiano; 2 of 3 Votes | Sofia; 2 of 3 Votes | Chiara; 2 of 3 Votes | Paola; 2 of 3 Votes | Silver; 2 of 3 Votes | Yavanna bottom | Giuliano; Runner-up |
| Eliminates | Francesco; 2 of 2 Votes | Horrible Porno; Stuntmen; 2 of 3 Votes | A&K; 2 of 2 Votes | Ornella; 2 of 3 Votes | Mario; 2 of 3 Votes | Francesca; 2 of 3 Votes | Cristiana; 2 of 3 Votes | Damiano; 2 of 3 Votes | Sofia; 2 of 3 Votes | Chiara; 2 of 3 Votes | Paola; 2 of 3 Votes | Silver; 2 of 3 Votes | Yavanna bottom | Marco; Winner |

The A&K, Mara's group, were formed by Andrea and Chiara (Kiara). However, Chiara was later disqualified from the show because of a regulation prohibiting the sons/daughters of RAI employees from entering the show, in this case, Chiara's Mother. She was replaced by Daniele Vit.

== Fourth season (2010) ==
From that year there are four categories with the respective judges:

- Mara Maionchi (16-24 Boys)
- Anna Tatangelo (16-24 Girls)
- Elio (25 +)
- Enrico Ruggeri (Vocal Groups)

| | Week 1 | Week 2 | Week 3 | Week 4 | Week 5 | Week 6 | Week 7 | Week 8 | Week 9 | Week 10 | | Week 11 | FINAL Week 12 | |
| | Week 1 | Week 2 | Week 3 | Week 4 | Week 5 | Week 6 | Week 7 | Week 8 | Week 9 | Saturday | Tuesday | Week 11 | Round 1 | Round 2 |
|---|---|---|---|---|---|---|---|---|---|---|---|---|---|---|
| Nathalie Giannitrapani | Bottom two | Safe | Safe | Safe | Safe | Safe | Safe | Safe | Bottom two | Safe | Safe | Safe | Safe | Winner (Final Week) |
| Davide Mogavero | Safe | Safe | Safe | Safe | Safe | Safe | Safe | Bottom two | Safe | Safe | Safe | Safe | Safe | Runner-up (Final Week) |
| Nevruz Joku | Safe | Safe | Safe | Safe | Safe | Safe | Safe | Safe | Safe | Bottom two | Safe | Bottom two | Bottom | Eliminated (Final Week) |
| Kymera | Safe | Safe | Safe | Safe | Safe | Bottom two | Safe | Safe | Safe | Safe | Bottom two | Bottom two | Eliminated (Week 12) | |
| Stefano Filipponi | Safe | Safe | Safe | Safe | Safe | Safe | Safe | Safe | Safe | Safe | Bottom two | Eliminated (Week 11) | | |
| Ruggero Pasquarelli | Safe | Safe | Safe | Safe | Safe | Safe | Bottom two | Safe | Safe | Bottom two | Eliminated (Week 10) | | | |
| Marika Lermani | Not in Competition | | | | | | | | Bottom two | Eliminated (Week 9) | | | | |
| Dami | Not in Competition | | | | | Safe | Safe | Bottom two | Eliminated (Week 8) | | | | | |
| Cassandra Raffaele | Not in Competition | | | Safe | Bottom two | Safe | Bottom two | Eliminated (Week 7) | | | | | | |
| Dorina Leka | Safe | Bottom two | Safe | Safe | Safe | Bottom two | Eliminated (Week 6) | | | | | | | |
| Manuela Zanier | Safe | Safe | Safe | Bottom two | Bottom two | Eliminated (Week 5) | | | | | | | | |
| Effetto Doppler | Safe | Safe | Bottom two | Bottom two | Eliminated (Week 4) | | | | | | | | | |
| Borghi Bros | Safe | Safe | Bottom two | Eliminated (Week 3) | | | | | | | | | | |
| Sofia Buconi | Safe | Bottom two | Eliminated (Week 2) | | | | | | | | | | | |
| Alessandra Falconieri | Bottom two | Eliminated (Week 1) | | | | | | | | | | | | |
| Bottom two | Nathalie, Alessandra | Dorina, Sofia | Effetto Doppler, Borghi Bros | Effetto Doppler, Manuela | Cassandra, Manuela | Dorina, Kymera | Cassandra, Ruggero | Dami, Davide | Marika, Nathalie | Ruggero, Nevruz | Kymera, Stefano | Kymera, Nevruz | | |
| Elio's vote | Alessandra | Sofia | Effetto Doppler | Effetto Doppler | Manuela | Kymera | Ruggero | Dami | Marika | Ruggero | Stefano | Kymera | | |
| Mara's vote | Alessandra | (Sofia) | Borghi Bros | Effetto Doppler | Cassandra | Dorina | Cassandra | Davide | Marika | Nevruz | Kymera | Kymera | | |
| Anna's vote | Nathalie | Sofia | Borghi Bros | Effetto Doppler | Manuela | Kymera | Cassandra | Dami | Nathalie | Nevruz | Kymera | Kymera | | |
| Enrico's vote | Nathalie | Sofia | Borghi Bros | Manuela | Manuela | Dorina | Cassandra | Dami | Marika | Ruggero | Stefano | Nevruz | | |
| Eliminates | Alessandra public vote | Sofia; 3 of 3 votes | Borghi Bros; 3 of 4 votes | Effetto Doppler; 3 of 4 votes | Manuela; 3 of 4 votes | Dorina public vote | Cassandra; 3 of 4 votes | Dami; 3 of 4 votes | Marika; 3 of 4 votes | Ruggero public vote | Stefano public vote | Kymera; 3 of 4 votes | Nevruz bottom | Davide; Runner-up |
| Eliminates | Alessandra public vote | Sofia; 3 of 3 votes | Borghi Bros; 3 of 4 votes | Effetto Doppler; 3 of 4 votes | Manuela; 3 of 4 votes | Dorina public vote | Cassandra; 3 of 4 votes | Dami; 3 of 4 votes | Marika; 3 of 4 votes | Ruggero public vote | Stefano public vote | Kymera; 3 of 4 votes | Nevruz bottom | Nathalie; Winner |

== Fifth season (2011–2012) ==
The fifth season of X Factor was televised from 20 October 2011 to 5 January 2012. For the first time, it was broadcast by Sky Uno HD, rather than Rai 2. The auditions were held from 5 July to 12 September 2011.

== Sixth season (2012) ==
The sixth season of X Factor started on 20 September 2012. It is broadcast live by Sky Uno HD, and a short version recorded broadcast on free digital TV Cielo.

== Seventh season (2013) ==
The seventh season of X Factor started on 26 September 2013. It is broadcast live by Sky Uno HD.

== Eighth season (2014) ==
The eighth season of X Factor started on 18 September 2014. It is broadcast live by Sky Uno HD.

== Ninth season (2015) ==
The ninth season of X Factor started on 10 September 2015. It is broadcast live by Sky Uno HD.

== Tenth season (2016) ==
The tenth season of X Factor started on 22 September 2016. It was broadcast live by Sky Uno HD, and a recorded version was broadcast on free digital channel TV8.

== Eleventh season (2017) ==
The eleventh season of X Factor started on 14 September 2017. It is broadcast live by Sky Uno HD, and a recorded version is broadcast on free digital channel TV8. The season finale, aired on 14 December 2017, marked the victory of Lorenzo Licitra against Måneskin and became the most viewed Italian X Factor live show ever.

== Twelfth season (2018) ==
The twelfth season of X Factor started on 6 September 2018. It was broadcast live by Sky Uno HD, and a recorded version was broadcast on free digital channel TV8. The final episode of the season, aired on both Sky Uno HD and TV8, was won by Anastasio. This marked Mara Maionchi's second victory in a row.

This season also featured Asia Argento as a judge before she was fired after being accused of sexual misconduct by actor Jimmy Bennett.

== Thirteenth season (2019) ==
The thirteenth season of X Factor started on 12 September 2019. It was broadcast live by Sky Uno HD, and a recorded version was broadcast on free digital channel TV8.

== Fourteenth season (2020) ==
The fourteenth season of X Factor started on 17 September 2020. It was broadcast live by Sky Uno HD and a recorded version was broadcast on free digital channel TV8. The final episode of the season, aired on both Sky Uno HD and TV8, was won by Casadilego. This marked Hell Raton's first victory.

== Fifteenth season (2021) ==
The fifteenth season of X Factor started on 16 September 2021 and concluded on 9 December with Baltimora being the winner, marking the second and final victory for Hell Raton.

== Sixteenth season (2022) ==
The sixteenth season of X Factor started on 15 September 2022 and concluded on 8 December with Santi Francesi winning, marking the only victory for Rkomi.

== Seventeenth season (2023) ==
The seventeenth season of X Factor started on 14 September 2023, and concluded on 7 December with Sarafine winning, marking the second win for Fedez.

Following the fourth live show, Morgan would be fired as judge following inappropriate behavior towards production and fellow judges. This would mark the second time in the show's history of a judge being fired mid-season.

== Eighteenth season (2024) ==
The eighteenth season of X Factor started on 12 September 2024, and concluded on 5 December with Mimì Caruso winning, marking the first win for Manuel Agnelli.

This season, mentor Achille Lauro became the first judge in the history of the show to bring three acts to the final.

== Nineteenth season (2025) ==
The nineteenth season of X Factor started on 11 September 2025, and concluded on 4 December with Rob winning, marking the first win for Paola Iezzi.

== Twentieth season (2026) ==
The twentieth season of X Factor started on 10 September 2026.
