= Licitra =

Licitra is a surname. Notable people with the surname include:

- Lorenzo Licitra (born 1991), Italian pop singer
- Salvatore Licitra (1968–2011), Italian operatic tenor

== See also ==
- Meanings of minor-planet names: 15001–16000#088
