= Giò Sada =

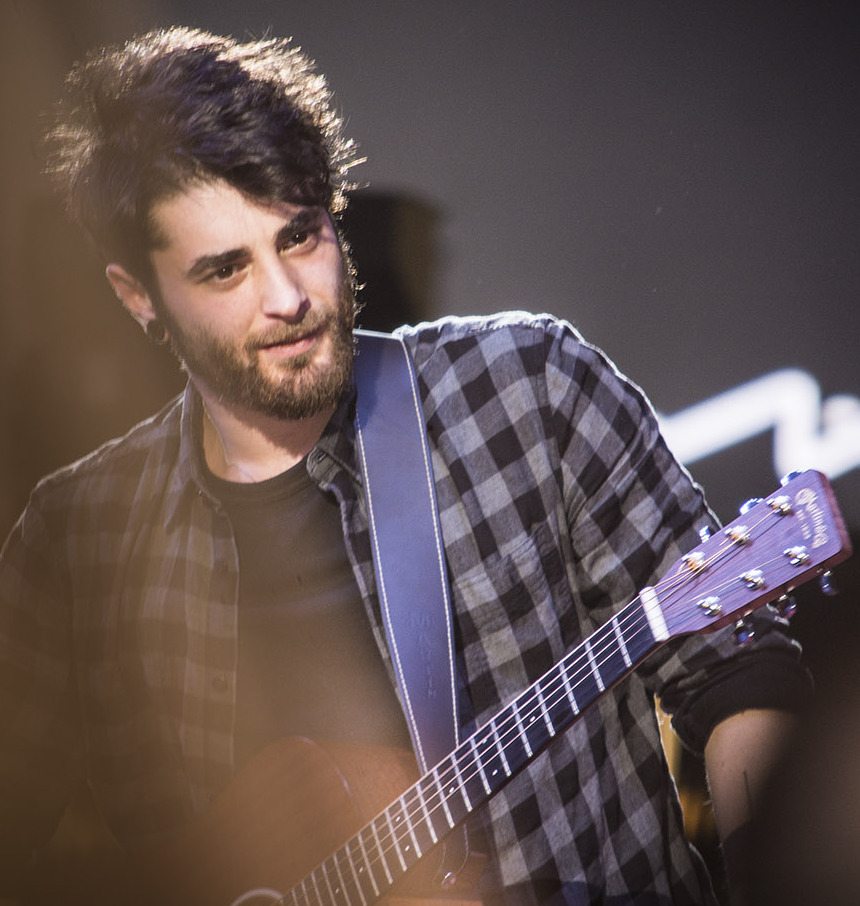
- Sada in concert in Turin in 2015

Background information
- Also known as: Gulliver
- Born: Giovanni Sada; 10 September 1989 (age 36); Bari, Italy
- Genres: Rock
- Occupations: Singer-songwriter, actor
- Years active: 2015–present
- Label: Sony Music

Giovanni "Giò" Sada (born 10 September 1989), also known as Gulliver, is an Italian singer-songwriter and actor. He is best known for winning the ninth season of the Italian talent show X Factor in 2015. His debut single, "Il rimpianto di te", was released on 4 December 2015.

== Early life ==
Giovanni Sada was born in Bari, Apulia, in southern Italy, on 10 September 1989. Encouraged by his father Silvio, a member of the band "Addosso gli scalini", and by his mother Paola, a dancer and musician, he began singing at the age of seven.

Shortly after starting to study Food and Wine Heritage at the Università degli studi di Bari Aldo Moro, he left university and focused on music, touring across Europe. He also worked as a porter and as a stage assembler, and he later joined an acting company.

== Career ==
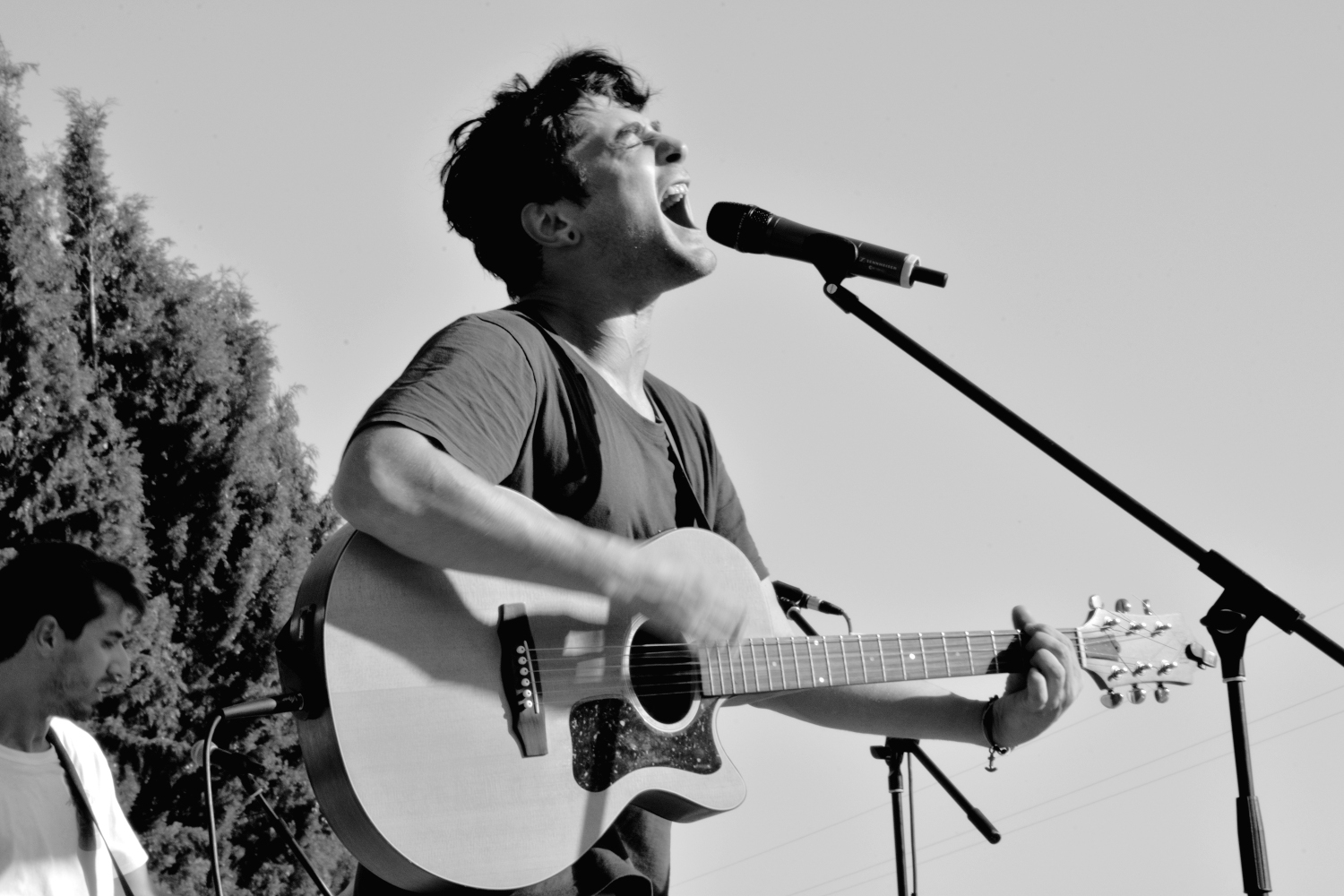
Giò Sada live with Barismoothsquad

In 2007, Sada became the lead singer of his first band, No Blame, a punk rock band from Bari that released an EP, Keep the Hardcore Elite in 2008 and an album Burning the Blindfolds in 2010 and went on tour around Europe following the release of the record. His next experience is with the band Waiting for Better Days, performing hardcore punk and metal music.

The band released the album To Those Who Believe to Be Left Alone in April 2012, for Italian independent label Indelirium Records. In 2013, he also became the leader of the band Barismoothsquad, which released its first self-produced studio album in July 2014, Barismoothsquad. Together with his bands, Giosada also toured across Europe.

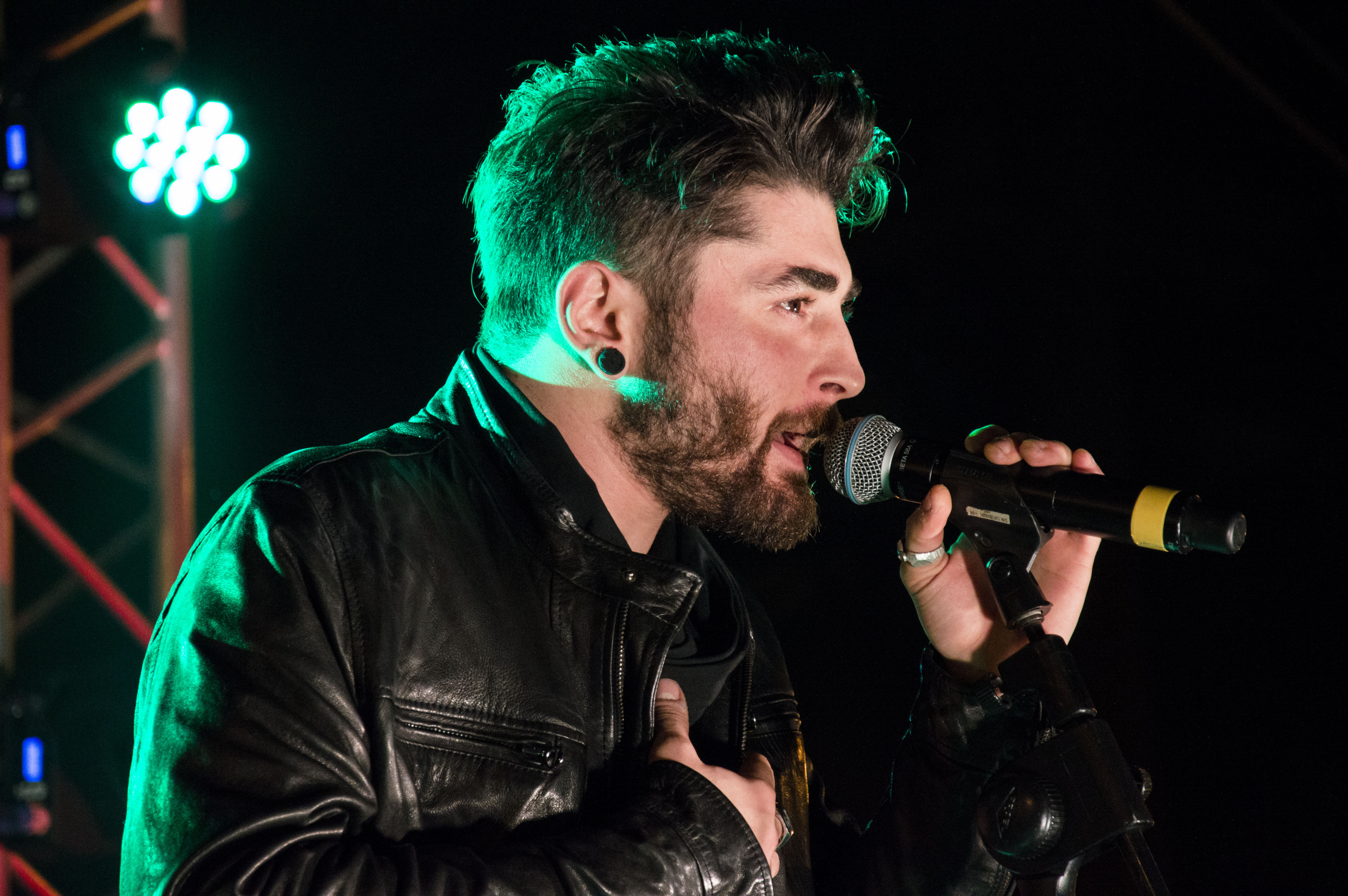
Giosada performing live in Bari

In 2015, Sada took part in the shooting of the independent film Dove chi entra urla, directed by Fabrizio Pastore, interpreting one of the main characters, Priso. The film is set to be released in Italian theatres in 2016. During the same year, he successfully auditioned for the ninth series of X Factor, singing Depeche Mode's "Personal Jesus". He competed in the "Over 25" category, mentored by Elio. During the fifth live show, he finished in the bottom two, but was saved by the judges, who voted to eliminate the band Landlord. On 3 December 2015, during the semi-final of the show, Sada performed his first single, "Il rimpianto di te", co-written with Italian singer-songwriter Pacifico and Alberto Tafuri, and released the following day to digital stores and Italian radio stations. On 10 December 2015, Sada was announced the winner, beating runner up duo Urban Strangers. Sada's self-titled debut EP, including the single "Il rimpianto di te" and five studio recordings of covers previously performed during the show, was released on 11 December 2015.

== Discography ==
=== Studio albums ===
List of studio albums, with selected chart positions and certifications
Title	Album details	Peak chart positions
Title	Album details	ITA
Volando al contrario	Released: 23 September 2016; Label: Sony BMG; Formats: CD, digital download	8
Terranova (as Gulliver)	Released: 28 February 2020; Label: Kallax Records; Formats: CD, digital download	—
"—" denotes an item that did not chart in that country.

=== EPs ===
List of extended plays, with selected chart positions and certifications
Title	Details	Peak chart positions
Title	Details	ITA
Giosada	Released: 11 December 2015; Label: Sony BMG; Formats: CD, digital download	25
Grande buio	Released: 2 July 2021; Label: Kallax Records; Formats: digital download	—
"—" denotes an item that did not chart in that country.

=== Singles ===
List of singles, with chart positions and certifications, showing year released and album name
Title	Year	Peak chart positions	Certifications	Album or EP
Title	Year	ITA	Certifications	Album or EP
"Il rimpianto di te"	2015	6	FIMI: Gold	Giosada
"Volando al contrario"	2016	—		Volando al contrario
"Deserto"	2016	—		Volando al contrario
"Lago"	2017	—		Volando al contrario
"Without an Edge" (featuring Concerto)	2017	—		Non-album single
"100 vite" (as Gulliver)	2019	—		Terranova
"L'essere meccanico" (as Gulliver)	2019	—		Terranova
"Se non sono necessario" (as Gulliver)	2020	—		Terranova
"—" denotes an item that did not chart in that country.

=== Other charted songs ===
List of other charted songs, with chart positions and certifications in Italy
Song	Year	Peak chart positions	Album or EP
Song	Year	ITA	Album or EP
"Retrograde"	2015	98	Giosada

=== Music videos ===
Title	Year	Director(s)
"Il rimpianto di te"	2015	Gaetano Morbioli

== Filmography ==
Television and films credits
Year	Film	Director	Role	Notes
2016	Dove chi entra urla	Fabrizio Pastore	Priso	
2016	Argento	Nicola Pertino	Antonio	Short film

Awards and achievements
Preceded by Lorenzo Fragola	Italian X Factor; Winner; 2015	Succeeded by Soul System
