= X Factor (Italian TV series) season 10 =

X Factor
- Season 10
- Hosted by: Alessandro Cattelan (Sky Uno)/(TV8)
- Judges: Alvaro Soler; Arisa; Fedez; Manuel Agnelli
- Winner: Soul System
- Winning mentor: Alvaro Soler
- Runner-up: Gaia

Release
- Original network: Sky Uno; TV8
- Original release: 15 September – 15 December 2016

Season chronology
- ← Previous; Season 9 Next → Season 11

X Factor is an Italian television music competition to find new singing talent; the winner receives a recording contract with Sony Music. Fedez was confirmed as judge and mentor, Arisa returned, while Manuel Agnelli and Alvaro Soler were chosen to replace Skin and Elio; Alessandro Cattelan was confirmed as host. The tenth season aired on Sky Uno and TV8 starting from September 2016. Soul System became the second group to win the competition since it began.

== Judges' houses ==
The "Home Visit" is the final phase before the Live Shows. In this phase, the contestants who passed the "Bootcamp" had to perform one last time in front of their specific judge, each in a different location. At the end of this audition, the top twelve contestants were chosen.

The twelve eliminated acts were:

- Boys at Turin: Lorenzo Aleandri, Salvatore Misiano, Diego Micheli
- Girls at Saint-Tropez: Valentina Giardullo, Sofia Rollo, Grace
- 25+ at Bologna: Simone Nannicini, Giovanni Diana, Veronica Marchi
- Groups at Barcelona: IISO, Soul System, Oak

== Contestants and categories ==
Key:

– Winner
– Runner-up
– Third place
– Withdrew

| Category (mentor) | Acts | | |
|---|---|---|---|
| Boys (Arisa) | Diego Conti | Fem (Marco Ferreri) | Loomy (Lorenzo Lumia) |
| Girls (Fedez) | Caterina Cropelli | Gaia Gozzi | Roshelle (Rossella Discolo) |
| 25+ (Agnelli) | Andrea Biagioni | Silva Fortes (Alessandra Fortes Silva) | Eva Pevarello |
| Groups (Alvaro Soler) | Daiana Lou | Les Enfants | Soul System |

Soul System replaced Jarvis who withdrew from the competition before the live shows.

== Live shows ==
=== Results summary ===
Colour key

| – | Contestant was in the bottom two/three and had to sing again in the final showdown |
| – | Contestant was announced at risk being in the bottom three |
| – | Contestant received the fewest public votes and was immediately eliminated (no final showdown) |
| – | Contestant received the most public votes |

Weekly results per contestant
| Contestant | Week 1 | | Week 2 | | Week 3 | | Week 4 | | | Week 5 | | Quarter-final | | Semi-Final | | Final | | |
| Contestant | Part 1 | Part 2 | Part 1 | Part 2 | Part 1 | Part 2 | Part 1 | Part 2 | Part 3 | Round 1 | Round 2 | Round 1 | Round 2 | Round 1 | Round 2 | Round 1 | Round 2 | Round 3 |
|---|---|---|---|---|---|---|---|---|---|---|---|---|---|---|---|---|---|---|
| Soul System | 1st | —N/a | —N/a | 1st | —N/a | 1st | —N/a | —N/a | 1st | 1st | 1st | 1st | 1st | 1st | 1st | 1st | 1st | Winner |
| Gaia Gozzi | 2nd | —N/a | 1st | —N/a | 2nd | —N/a | —N/a | 1st | —N/a | 2nd | 2nd | 3rd | 5th | 3rd | 2nd | 2nd | 2nd | Runner-Up |
| Eva Pevarello | —N/a | 1st | 2nd | —N/a | 1st | —N/a | 2nd | —N/a | —N/a | 3rd | 6th | 2nd | 2nd | 2nd | 3rd | 3rd | 3rd | Eliminated (final) |
| Roshelle | —N/a | 3rd | —N/a | 2nd | —N/a | 3rd | 1st | —N/a | —N/a | 6th | 3rd | 5th | 3rd | 4th | 4th | 4th | Eliminated (final) | |
| Andrea Biagioni | —N/a | 2nd | —N/a | 3rd | —N/a | 2nd | —N/a | 2nd | —N/a | 5th | 4th | 4th | 4th | 5th | —N/a | Eliminated (semi-final) | | |
| Loomy | —N/a | 4th | 4th | —N/a | —N/a | 5th | 3rd | —N/a | —N/a | 4th | 5th | 6th | —N/a | Eliminated (quarter-final) | | | | |
| Caterina Cropelli | 3rd | —N/a | —N/a | 5th | —N/a | 4th | —N/a | —N/a | 2nd | 7th | 7th | Eliminated (Week 5) | | | | | | |
| Fem | 5th | —N/a | —N/a | 4th | 4th | —N/a | —N/a | —N/a | 3rd | Eliminated (Week 4) | | | | | | | | |
| Daiana Lou | —N/a | 5th | 3rd | —N/a | 3rd | —N/a | —N/a | 3rd | —N/a | Withdrew (Week 4) | | | | | | | | |
| Silva Fortes | 4th | —N/a | 5th | —N/a | 5th | —N/a | Eliminated (Week 3) | | | | | | | | | | | |
| Les Enfants | 6th | —N/a | 6th | —N/a | Eliminated (Week 2) | | | | | | | | | | | | | |
| Diego Conti | —N/a | 6th | Eliminated (Week 1) | | | | | | | | | | | | | | | |
| Final showdown | Les Enfants; Diego Conti | | Les Enfants; Caterina Cropelli | | Silva Fortes; Loomy | | Fem; Loomy; Daiana Lou | | | Caterina Cropelli; Eva Pevarello | | Loomy; Gaia Gozzi | | Andrea Biagioni; Roshelle | | No final showdown or judges' vote: results will be based on public votes alone | | |
| Judges' vote to eliminate | | | | | | | | | | | | | | | | No final showdown or judges' vote: results will be based on public votes alone | | |
| Agnelli's vote | Diego Conti | | Caterina Cropelli | | Loomy | | - | | | Caterina Cropelli | | Loomy | | Roshelle | | No final showdown or judges' vote: results will be based on public votes alone | | |
| Arisa's vote | Les Enfants | | Les Enfants | | Silva Fortes | | - | | | Caterina Cropelli | | Gaia Gozzi | | Andrea Biagioni | | No final showdown or judges' vote: results will be based on public votes alone | | |
| Fedez's vote | Diego Conti | | Les Enfants | | Silva Fortes | | - | | | Eva Pevarello | | Loomy | | Andrea Biagioni | | No final showdown or judges' vote: results will be based on public votes alone | | |
| Soler's vote | Diego Conti | | Caterina Cropelli | | Silva Fortes | | - | | | Caterina Cropelli | | Loomy | | Roshelle | | No final showdown or judges' vote: results will be based on public votes alone | | |
| Eliminated | Diego Conti; 3 of 4 votes majority | | Les Enfants; Public vote to save | | Silva Fortes; 3 of 4 votes majority | | Fem; Public vote to save Daiana Lou; Withdrew | | | Caterina Cropelli; 3 of 4 votes majority | | Loomy; 3 of 4 votes majority | | Andrea Biagioni; Public vote to save | | Roshelle; 4th place | Eva Pevarello; 3rd place | Gaia Gozzi; Runner-Up |
| Eliminated | Diego Conti; 3 of 4 votes majority | | Les Enfants; Public vote to save | | Silva Fortes; 3 of 4 votes majority | | Fem; Public vote to save Daiana Lou; Withdrew | | | Caterina Cropelli; 3 of 4 votes majority | | Loomy; 3 of 4 votes majority | | Andrea Biagioni; Public vote to save | | Roshelle; 4th place | Eva Pevarello; 3rd place | Soul System; Winner |

=== Live show details ===
==== Week 1 (27 October) ====
- Celebrity performers: Marco Mengoni ("Sai che") and Matt Simons ("Light in You"/"Ad occhi chiusi")

Contestants' performances on the first live show
Part 1
| Act | Order | Song | Result |
|---|---|---|---|
| Soul System | 1 | "Holy Grail" | Safe |
| Caterina Cropelli | 2 | "La canzone di Marinella" | Safe |
| Fem | 3 | "Love Runs Out" | Safe |
| Silva Fortes | 4 | "The Blower's Daughter" | Safe |
| Les Enfants | 5 | "Bologna è una regola" | Bottom two |
| Gaia Gozzi | 6 | "Fast Car" | Safe |
Part 2
| Act | Order | Song | Result |
| Roshelle | 7 | "Heavydirtysoul" | Safe |
| Andrea Biagioni | 8 | "Fake Plastic Trees" | Safe |
| Loomy | 9 | "Panda"/"Don't Touch Me" | Safe |
| Daiana Lou | 10 | "Back in Black" | Safe |
| Diego Conti | 11 | "L'estate di John Wayne" | Bottom two |
| Eva Pevarello | 12 | "Wise Up" | Safe |
Final showdown details
| Act | Order | Song | Result |
| Les Enfants | 13 | "Che fantastica storia è la vita" | Safe |
| Diego Conti | 14 | "Io vivrò" | Eliminated |

Judges' votes to eliminate

- Soler: Diego Conti – backed his own act, Les Enfants.
- Arisa: Les Enfants – backed her own act, Diego Conti.
- Fedez: Diego Conti – said that he preferred Les Enfants.
- Agnelli: Diego Conti – said that he preferred Les Enfants.

==== Week 2 (3 November) ====
- Celebrity performers: Giorgia ("Oronero")

Contestants' performances on the second live show
Part 1
| Act | Order | Song | Result |
|---|---|---|---|
| Les Enfants | 1 | "Of the Night" | Bottom two |
| Loomy | 2 | "Ghost"/"Could You Be Loved" | Safe |
| Eva Pevarello | 3 | "Don't Wanna Fight" | Safe |
| Gaia Gozzi | 4 | "Human" | Safe |
| Daiana Lou | 5 | "Running with the Wolves" | Safe |
| Silva Fortes | 6 | "Another Way to Die" | Safe |
Part 2
| Act | Order | Song | Result |
| Fem | 7 | "Latch" | Safe |
| Soul System | 8 | "All That She Wants" | Safe |
| Caterina Cropelli | 9 | "Don't Know Why" | Bottom two |
| Andrea Biagioni | 10 | "Ballata per la mia piccola iena" | Safe |
| Roshelle | 11 | "Animal" | Safe |
Final showdown details
| Act | Order | Song | Result |
| Les Enfants | 12 | "I'm On Fire" | Eliminated |
| Caterina Cropelli | 13 | "Summertime Sadness" | Safe |

Judges' votes to eliminate

- Soler: Caterina Cropelli – backed his own act, Les Enfants.
- Fedez: Les Enfants – backed his own act, Caterina Cropelli.
- Arisa: Les Enfants – felt more connected to Caterina.
- Agnelli: Caterina Cropelli – said that he preferred Les Enfants.

With the acts in the sing-off receiving two votes each, the result went to deadlock and a new public vote commenced for 200 seconds. Les Enfants were eliminated as the act with the fewest public votes.

==== Week 3 (10 November) ====
- Theme: Generation icon
- Celebrity performers: Robbie Williams ("Party Like a Russian"/"Love My Life") and Shawn Mendes ("Mercy")

Contestants' performances on the third live show
Part 1
| Act | Order | Song | Result |
|---|---|---|---|
| Gaia Gozzi | 1 | "Piece of My Heart" | Safe |
| Silva Fortes | 2 | "Life on Mars?" | Bottom two |
| Fem | 3 | "Perfect Illusion" | Safe |
| Daiana Lou | 4 | "Wrecking Ball" | Safe |
| Eva Pevarello | 5 | "Lust for Life"/"Valerie" | Safe |
Part 2
| Act | Order | Song | Result |
| Soul System | 6 | "Thinking Out Loud" | Safe |
| Caterina Cropelli | 7 | "Everybody Hurts" | Safe |
| Loomy | 8 | "Anima Fragile" | Bottom two |
| Andrea Biagioni | 9 | "Black or White" | Safe |
| Roshelle | 10 | "Take Ü There" | Safe |
Final showdown details
| Act | Order | Song | Result |
| Silva Fortes | 11 | "A Change Is Gonna Come" | Eliminated |
| Loomy | 12 | "Formidable" | Safe |

Judges' votes to eliminate

- Agnelli: Loomy – backed his own act, Silva Fortes.
- Arisa: Silva Fortes – backed her own act, Loomy.
- Fedez: Silva Fortes – felt closer to Loomy and happy that there were rappers in his path like him.
- Soler: Silva Fortes – appreciated the continuous improvement of Loomy.

==== Week 4 (17 November) ====
- Celebrity performers: Lorenzo Fragola ("D'improvviso")

Contestants' performances on the fourth live show
Part 1
| Act | Order | Song | Result |
|---|---|---|---|
| Roshelle | 1 | "Confetti" | Safe |
| Loomy | 2 | "Gangnam Style" | Bottom three |
| Eva Pevarello | 3 | "Caruso" | Safe |
Part 2
| Act | Order | Song | Result |
| Andrea Biagioni | 4 | "Monna Lisa" | Safe |
| Gaia Gozzi | 5 | "Wild Things" | Safe |
| Daiana Lou | 6 | "Dio, come ti amo" | Bottom three |
Part 3
| Act | Order | Song | Result |
| Fem | 7 | "Sledgehammer" | Bottom three |
| Soul System | 8 | "Gold Digger" | Safe |
| Caterina Cropelli | 9 | "Kiss the Sky" | Safe |
Final showdown details
| Act | Order | Song | Result |
| Loomy | 10 | "Panda"/"Don't Touch Me" | Safe |
| Daiana Lou | 11 | "Chandelier" | Withdrew |
| Fem | 12 | "Writing's on the Wall" | Eliminated |

==== Week 5 (24 November) ====
- Celebrity performers: Little Mix ("Shout Out to My Ex")

Contestants' performances on the fifth live show
Round 1
| Act | Order | Song | Result |
|---|---|---|---|
| Andrea Biagioni | 1 | "Hurt" | At risk |
| Soul System | 2 | "Gravity" | Safe |
| Caterina Cropelli | 3 | "Wake Me Up" | At risk |
| Eva Pevarello | 4 | "Across the Universe" | Safe |
| Roshelle | 5 | "Hide and Seek" | At risk |
| Loomy | 6 | "Hey Boy Hey Girl" | Safe |
| Gaia Gozzi | 7 | "Vedrai vedrai" | Safe |
Round 2
| Act | Order | Song | Result |
| Roshelle | 8 | "Umbrella" | Safe |
| Andrea Biagioni | 9 | "Uptown Funk" | Safe |
| Soul System | 10 | "Midnight City" | Safe |
| Loomy | 11 | "Il piccolo corazziere" | Safe |
| Gaia Gozzi | 12 | "Lean On" | Safe |
| Eva Pevarello | 13 | "Is This Love" | Bottom two |
| Caterina Cropelli | 14 | "Burn" | Bottom two |
Final showdown details
| Act | Order | Song | Result |
| Eva Pevarello | 15 | "I Put a Spell on You" | Safe |
| Caterina Cropelli | 16 | "Creep" | Eliminated |

Judges' votes to eliminate

- Agenlli: Caterina Cropelli – backed his own act, Eva Pevarello
- Fedez: Eva Pevarello – backed his own act, Caterina Cropelli
- Arisa: Caterina Cropelli – stated that she had preferred Pevarello.
- Soler: Caterina Cropelli – said he did not understand why Pevarello was in the bottom two.

==== Week 6: Quarter-final (1 December) ====
- Celebrity performers: Skunk Anansie & Fabio Rovazzi

Contestants' performances on the sixth live show
Round 1
| Act | Order | Song | Result |
|---|---|---|---|
| Roshelle | 1 | "Doo Wop (That Thing)" | Safe |
| Soul System | 2 | "Feel Good Inc." | Safe |
| Eva Pevarello | 3 | "Mad About You" | Safe |
| Loomy | 4 | "Cheap Thrills" | Bottom two |
| Andrea Biagioni | 5 | "Wonderwall" | Safe |
| Gaia Gozzi | 6 | "Let It Go" | Safe |
Round 2
| Act | Order | Song | Result |
| Andrea Biagioni | 7 | "Please, Please, Please Let Me Get What I Want" | Safe |
| Roshelle | 8 | "No" | Safe |
| Gaia Gozzi | 9 | "Come foglie" | Bottom two |
| Soul System | 10 | "Where Is the Love?" | Safe |
| Eva Pevarello | 11 | "Senza Fine" | Safe |
Final showdown details
| Act | Order | Song | Result |
| Loomy | 12 | "Anima Fragile" | Eliminated |
| Gaia Gozzi | 13 | "Youth" | Safe |

Judges' votes to eliminate

- Arisa: Gaia Gozzi – backed her own act, Loomy.
- Fedez: Loomy – backed his own act, Gaia Gozzi.
- Soler: Loomy – gave no reason.
- Agnelli: Loomy – said that he wanted to hear more from Gozzi.

==== Week 7: Semi-final (8 December) ====
Contestants' performances on the seventh live show
Round 1
| Act | Order | Original Songs | Result |
|---|---|---|---|
| Gaia Gozzi | 1 | "New Dawns" | Safe |
| Eva Pevarello | 2 | "Voglio andare fino in fondo" | Safe |
| Soul System | 3 | "She's Like a Star" | Safe |
| Roshelle | 4 | "What U Do to Me" | Safe |
| Andrea Biagioni | 5 | "Il mare dentro" | Bottom two |
Round 2
| Act | Order | Song | Result |
| Roshelle | 6 | "Best Mistake" | Bottom two |
| Eva Pevarello | 7 | "Appletree" | Safe |
| Gaia Gozzi | 8 | "Worry" | Safe |
| Soul System | 9 | "Can't Hold Us" | Safe |
Final showdown details
| Act | Order | Song | Result |
| Andrea Biagioni | 10 | "Hallelujah" | Eliminated |
| Roshelle | 11 | "Cold Water" | Safe |

Judges' votes to eliminate

- Agnelli: Roshelle – backed his own act, Andrea Biagioni.
- Fedez: Andrea Biagioni – backed his own act, Roshelle.
- Arisa: Andrea Biagioni – gave no reason.
- Soler: Roshelle – could not decide so chose to take it to deadlock.

With the acts in the sing-off receiving two votes each, the result went to deadlock and reverted to the earlier public vote. Andrea Biagioni was eliminated as the act with the fewest public votes.

==== Week 8: Final (15 December) ====
Contestants' performances on the final live show
Round 1
| Act | Order | Song | Result |
|---|---|---|---|
| Gaia Gozzi | 1 | "I Will Pray (Pregherò)" (With Giorgia) | Safe |
| Soul System | 2 | "Roma-Bangkok" (with Giusy Ferreri and Baby K) | Safe |
| Eva Pevarello | 3 | "L'ultimo bacio" (with Carmen Consoli) | Safe |
| Roshelle | 4 | "Rockabye" (with Clean Bandit) | 4th place |
Round 2
| Act | Order | Original Songs | Result |
| Eva Pevarello | 5 | "Voglio andare fino in fondo" | 3rd place |
| Soul System | 6 | "She's Like a Star" | Safe |
| Gaia Gozzi | 7 | "New Dawns" | Safe |
Round 3
| Act | Order | Mashup | Result |
| Gaia Gozzi | 8 | "Human"/"Piece of My Heart"/"Lean On" | Runner-up |
| Soul System | 9 | "Gravity"/"Gold Digger"/"Can't Hold Us" | Winner |
