= Victoria Cabello =

Italian television presenter

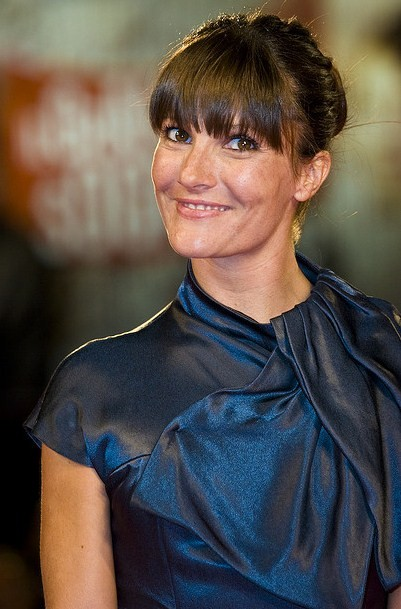
Victoria Cabello

Victoria Ellen Cabello (born 12 March 1975, in London) is an Italian television presenter, and actress.

She was born in London to an Italian father and an English mother, and grew up in Valsolda, a small town in the province of Como, just a few kilometers from Switzerland.

Cabello started her television career in 1997 as one of MTV Italy's original VJs, where she hosted Select MTV from London. She also appeared on Italia 1's Le Iene (the Italian version of Caiga quien caiga) where she performed comic interviews with famous Italian and international celebrities. Between 2005 and 2008, Cabello hosted the talk show Very Victoria on MTV Italy. In 2006, she hosted the 56th Sanremo Music Festival with Giorgio Panariello. In 2009, she moved from MTV Italy to La7, where she hosted the talk show Victor Victoria – Niente è come sembra.

From September 2011 to May 2013, she hosted a show about football Quelli che... il Calcio on Rai 2.

In 2014, she replaced Simona Ventura as judge on the eighth season of the Italian version of X Factor alongside Fedez, Morgan, and Mika.

== Filmography ==
Film
Year	Title	Role(s)	Notes
1995	Ragazzi della notte	Sylvie	
2008	Il cosmo sul comò	Lady with an Ermine	
2011	Rio	Gioiel (voice)	Italian dub; voice role
2012	Tell No One	Herself	Cameo appearance
2013	Border	None	Executive producer

Television
Year	Title	Role(s)	Notes
2004–2005	Cuore contro cuore	Alice	Main role
2004–2007	Drawn Together	Toot Braunstein	Main role; voice
2010	A un pelo dalla Victoria	Herself	Web series; lead role

== Television ==
Year	Title	Role(s)	Notes
1997–1998	MTV Select	Herself / Presenter	Musical program
1998	MTV on the Beach	Herself / Presenter	Special
1998	MTV Europe Music Awards	Herself / Interviewer	Annual ceremony
1998–2008	MTV Day	Herself / Presenter	Musical program
2000	MTV Video Music Awards	Herself / Interviewer	Annual ceremony
2000	MTV Movie & TV Awards	Herself / Interviewer	Annual ceremony
2000	World Pride Roma 2000	Herself / Interviewer	Special
2002–2007	Le Iene	Herself / Reporter	Information program (seasons 6–10)
2005	Isle of MTV	Herself / Presenter	Annual event
2005–2008	Very Victoria	Herself / Presenter	Talk show
2006	Sanremo Music Festival 2006	Herself / Co-host	Annual music festival
2009–2010	Victor Victoria	Herself / Presenter	Talk show
2010	A un pelo dalla Victoria	Herself	Web series; lead role
2011–2013	Quelli che... il Calcio	Herself / Presenter	Sports program (season 19–20)
2014	The X Factor	Herself / Judge	Talent show (season 8)
2019	Scoprire la Cina: Galà dell'amicizia Italia-Cina	Herself / Presenter	Special
2022	Pechino Express	Herself / Contestant	Reality show (season 9)
2023	Victoria Cabello: Viaggi pazzeschi	Herself / Host	Docuseries
