= Davide Shorty =

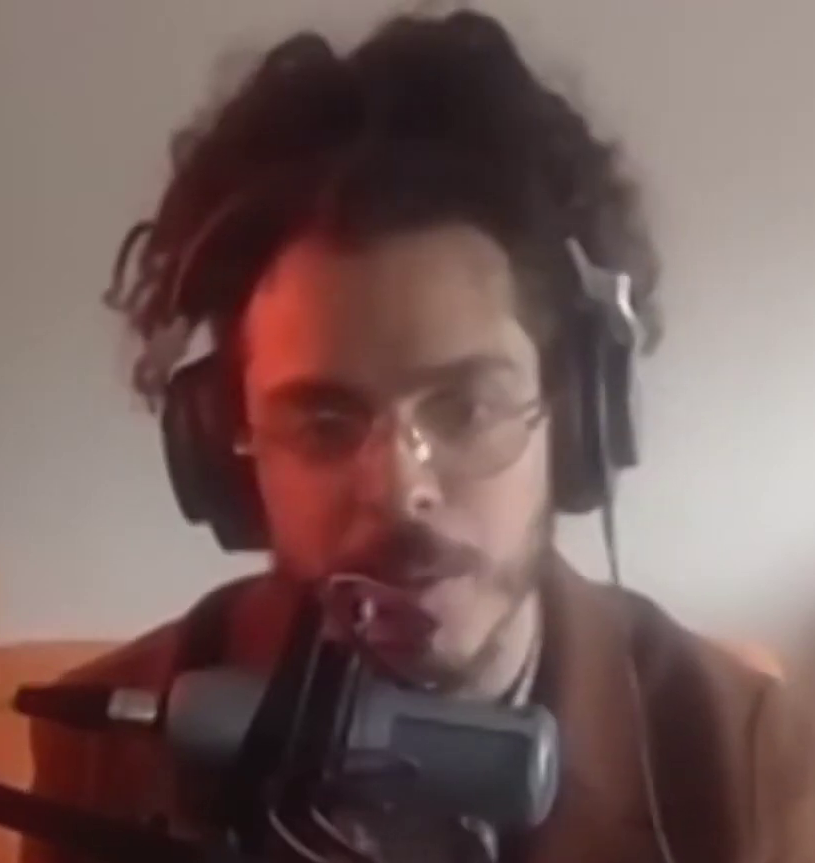

Background information
- Born: Davide Sciortino; 27 June 1989 (age 37); Palermo, Sicily, Italy
- Genres: Hip-hop soul; contemporary R&B; funk
- Years active: 2007–present
- Labels: Sony Music; Macro Beats; Totally Imported; Artist First

Davide Sciortino (born 27 June 1989), known as Davide Shorty or simply Shorty, is an Italian singer.

== Biography ==
Active as musician and frontman in various bands from the end of the years 2000 and the early years 2010, from 2007 till 2010 he was part of the group Combomastas' with whom he realised the albums Piccolo and Shorty VS The Supa Produsa. After that he settled in London where two years later he founded the Retrospective for Love with guitar player Alessandro La Barbera, pianist and producer Gaba and base guitarist Agostino Collura. Later Leslie Phillips joined them. With this formation the published Retrospective for Love EP (2014) and Random Activities of a Heart (2017).

In 2015 he took part in the ninth series of Italian TV programme X Factor, where he came in third. During the show, he released the single "My Soul Trigger", which reached the top ten of the Italian FIMI Singles Chart. On 11 December of the same year he released the EP Davide Shorty for the Sony Music label.

On February 24, 2017, he released his first solo album, Straniero, through the Macro Beats label and distributed by A1 Entertainment. The following year he collaborated with Funk Shui Project on the album Terapia di gruppo, which he continued the following year with La soluzione. In June 2020, a re-edition of the album entitled La Soluzione was released.

On 15 July 2020, the single Canti ancora?! was released in collaboration with Elio, while the following October he was selected for AmaSanremo (i.e. five of the six evenings that make up Sanremo Giovani 2020) with the song "Regina". On 17 December he reached the final of the programme, at the end of which he was included in the list of eight young artists participating in the Sanremo Music Festival 2021 in the New Proposals section. At the event, in addition to placing second, he won the "Lucio Dalla" Press Room Award, the Lunezia Award and the "Enzo Jannacci" Award.

On 5 March 2021, the EP Fusion a metà was released, aimed at anticipating the second album Fusion, released on the following 30 April.

At the 2026 Winter Olympics closing ceremony, on 22 February in Verona, Shorty sang with Margherita Vicario to the music of Calibro 35.

== Discography ==
=== Solo ===
==== Studio albums ====
- 2017 – Straniero
- 2018 – Terapia di gruppo (with Funk Shui Project)
- 2019 – La soluzione (with Funk Shui Project)
- 2021 – Fusion.
- 2025 – Nuova forma

==== EPs ====
- 2015 – Davide Shorty
- 2021 – Fusion a metà

==== Singles ====
- 2015 – "My Soul Trigger"
- 2016 – "Cosa vorrei"
- 2018 – "Fallin' in Love" (with Palmaria)
- 2019 – "Dormi (Funk Rimini RMX)" (with Funk Shui Project)
- 2019 – "Visione" (with Funk Shui Project)
- 2019 – "In un abbraccio" (with Funk Shui Project)
- 2019 – "Solo con me"' (with Funk Shui Project, featuring Johnny Marsiglia)
- 2020 – "Reboot" (with Funk Shui Project)
- 2020 – "Canti ancora?!" (featuring Elio)
- 2020 – "Regina"
- 2021 – "Prima che faccia notte"
- 2022 – "Fame chimica"

==== Collaborations ====
- 2010 – "Avvoltoi" (DJ Myke feat. Claver Gold and Davide Shorty)
- 2016 – "Love & Feelings" (Cranio Randagio feat. Davide Shorty)
- 2017 – "Oltre" (DJ Argento feat. Blo/B, Davide Shorty & Lord Madness)
- 2017 – "How About U" (Godblesscomputers feat. Davide Shorty)
- 2017 – "Notte di vino" (Claver Gold feat. Davide Shorty)
- 2018 – "Clessidra" (Johnny Marsiglia feat. Davide Shorty)
- 2018 – "Tempo" (Alien Army feat. Davide Shorty e Inoki Ness)
- 2018 – "A prima vista" (Shakalab feat. Davide Shorty)
- 2019 – "Tempi modesti" (Daniele Silvestri feat. Davide Shorty)
- 2020 – "Antiferno" (Claver Gold e Murubutu feat. Davide Shorty)
- 2022 – "Il mare" (Egreen feat. Davide Shorty)

=== With the Combomastas' ===
- 2007 – Piccolo
- 2010 – Shorty VS The Supa Produsa

=== With the Retrospective for Love ===
Studio album

- 2017 – Random Activities of a Heart

EP

- 2014 - Retrospective for Love EP

== Awards ==
- Festival di Sanremo
  - 2021 – Premio della Sala Stampa Lucio Dalla for the song "Regina"
  - 2021 – Premio Enzo Jannacci for the best interpretation
  - 2021 – Premio Lunezia for the musical-literary value of the song "Regina"
