= Soul System (Italian group) =

Italian band

- Origin: Brescia, Lombardy, Italy; Verona, Veneto, Italy
- Genres: Pop, R&B
- Years active: 2016-present
- Members: Leslie Sackey; Joel; Jiggy; David Yeboah; Alberto

Soul System is an Italian group who won the tenth season of the Italian version of the X Factor.

== History ==
Four of the band members have Ghanaian origins, but they were born in Verona and Brescia, Italy. They met in local Ghanaian and evangelical communities and eventually decided to form a band. The opportunity came when they met at the recording studio of Joel Ainoo, one of the members. In the summer of 2016 they had a number of live performances. After that, the band participated to the selection of The X Factor: first refused, the judge Álvaro Soler brought them back after the band Jarvis had left the show. Soul System reached the final and finally won the competition. They presented the song "She's Like a Star".

Together with Sergio Sylvestre, the band performed Nino Ferrer's "La pelle nera" during the third evening of the Sanremo Music Festival 2017. At the beginning of July they released a new song called "Liquido", which contains a sample of "Narcotic" by the German band Liquido. Their first studio album titled Back to the Future was released in September 2017.

== Discography ==
=== Studio albums ===
List of studio albums, with details and chart positions
Title	Album details	Peak chart positions
Title	Album details	ITA
Back to the Future	Released: 8 September 2017; Label: Sony Music; Format: CD, digital download	52

=== Extended plays ===
List of extended plays, with details and chart positions
Title	EP details	Peak chart positions
Title	EP details	ITA
She's Like a Star	Released: 9 December 2016; Label: Sony Music; Format: CD, digital download	20

=== Singles ===
List of singles, with chart positions, album name and certifications
Single	Year	Peak chart positions	Certifications	Album or EP
Single	Year	ITA	Certifications	Album or EP
"She's Like a Star"	2016	7	FIMI: Gold	She's Like a Star
"Liquido"	2017	—		Back to the Future
"White Niggas"	2017	—		Back to the Future
"Coma"	2019	—		Non-album single
"Topless"	2020	—		Non-album single
"Starlights"	2020	—		Non-album single
"Double Identity" (featuring Arya)	2021	—		Non-album single
"—" denotes an item that did not chart in that country.

==== As featured artist ====
Single	Year	Peak chart positions	Album or EP
Single	Year	ITA	Album or EP
"Stammi bene (On My Mind)" (Deborah Iurato featuring Soul System)	2019	—	Non-album single
"—" denotes an item that did not chart in that country.

Preceded by Giò Sada	X Factor (Italy); Winner; 2016	Succeeded by Lorenzo Licitra
