= X Factor (Italian TV series) season 11 =

X Factor
- Season 11
- Hosted by: Alessandro Cattelan
- Judges: Fedez; Levante; Manuel Agnelli; Mara Maionchi
- Winner: Lorenzo Licitra
- Winning mentor: Mara Maionchi
- Runner-up: Måneskin

Release
- Original network: Sky Uno; TV8
- Original release: 14 September – 14 December 2017

Season chronology
- ← Previous; Season 10 Next → Season 12

X Factor is an Italian television music competition to find new singing talent; the winner receives a recording contract with Sony Music. Fedez and Manuel Agnelli were confirmed as judges and mentors, as in previous seasons, Mara Maionchi returned to the panel, while singer-songwriter Levante made her debut. Alessandro Cattelan was confirmed as host. The eleventh season was aired on Thursday evenings on Sky Uno and TV8 between September and December 2017. Lorenzo Licitra won the competition and Mara Maionchi became the winning mentor for the first time. Runner-up Måneskin would later go on to win the Sanremo Music Festival 2021 and the Eurovision Song Contest 2021.

== Judges' houses ==
The "Home Visit" is the final phase before the Live Shows. In this phase, the contestants who passed the "Bootcamp" had to perform one last time in front of their allocated judge, each in a different locations. Manuel Agnelli chose Manchester as the location for his group category and was joined by former X-Factor Italy judge and mentor Skin. At the end of this final audition, the top twelve contestants were chosen.

The eight eliminated acts were:

- Boys: Domenico Arezzo, Kamless Kishnah
- Girls: Francesca Giannizzari, Isaure Cassone
- 25+: Andrea Spigaroli, Valerio Bifulco
- Groups: Ana & Carolina, The Heron Temple

== Contestants and categories ==
Key:

– Winner
– Runner-up
– Third place

Category (mentor)	Acts		
Boys (Fedez)	Lorenzo Bonamano	Gabriele Esposito	Samuel Storm
Girls (Levante)	Rita Bellanza	Camille Cabaltera	Virginia Perbellini
25+ (Maionchi)	Lorenzo Licitra	Enrico Nigiotti	Andrea Radice
Groups (Agnelli)	Måneskin	Ros	Sem & Stenn

== Live shows ==
=== Results summary ===
The number of votes received by each act will be released by Sky Italia after the final.

Colour key

–	Contestant was in the bottom two/three and had to sing again in the final showdown
–	Contestant was in the bottom three but was saved
–	Contestant was in the bottom three but received the fewest votes and was immediately eliminated
–	Contestant received the fewest public votes and was immediately eliminated (no final showdown)
–	Contestant received the most public votes

Weekly results per contestant
Contestant	Week 1	Week 2		Week 3		Week 4			Week 5		Quarter-Final		Semi-Final	Final		
Contestant	Week 1	Part 1	Part 2	Part 1	Part 2	Part 1	Part 2	Part 3	Round 1	Round 2	Round 1	Round 2	Semi-Final	Round 1	Round 2	Round 3
Lorenzo Licitra	1st	—N/a	1st	—N/a	1st	—N/a	1st	—N/a	3rd	3rd	1st	1st	2nd	1st	1st	Winner
Måneskin	3rd	1st	—N/a	1st	—N/a	—N/a	—N/a	1st	1st	1st	2nd	2nd	1st	2nd	2nd	Runner-up
Enrico Nigiotti	8th	3rd	—N/a	2nd	—N/a	1st	—N/a	—N/a	2nd	2nd	3rd	3rd	3rd	3rd	3rd	Eliminated (final)
Samuel Storm	5th	—N/a	2nd	3rd	—N/a	2nd	—N/a	—N/a	4th	4th	5th	4th	4th	4th	Eliminated (final)	
Ros	7th	—N/a	5th	5th	—N/a	—N/a	2nd	—N/a	7th	5th	4th	5th	5th	Eliminated (semi-final)		
Andrea Radice	4th	—N/a	3rd	—N/a	2nd	—N/a	—N/a	2nd	5th	6th	6th	6th	Eliminated (quarter-final)			
Rita Bellanza	2nd	4th	—N/a	—N/a	3rd	—N/a	3rd	—N/a	6th	7th	7th	Eliminated (quarter-final)				
Gabriele Esposito	9th	2nd	—N/a	—N/a	4th	—N/a	—N/a	3rd	8th	—N/a	Eliminated (Week 5)					
Camille Cabaltera	6th	—N/a	4th	4th	—N/a	3rd	—N/a	—N/a	Eliminated (Week 4)							
Sem & Stenn	10th	5th	—N/a	—N/a	5th	Eliminated (Week 3)										
Virginia Perbellini	12th	6th	—N/a	Eliminated (Week 2)												
Lorenzo Bonamano	11th	Eliminated (Week 1)														
Final showdown	Lorenzo Bonamano; Gabriele Esposito	Virginia Perbellini; Ros		Ros; Sem & Stenn		Camille Cabaltera; Gabriele Esposito			Rita Bellanza; Gabriele Esposito		Andrea Radice; Ros		Ros; Samuel Storm	No final showdown or judges' vote: results will be based on public votes alone		
Judges' vote to eliminate														No final showdown or judges' vote: results will be based on public votes alone		
Agnelli's vote	-	Virginia Perbellini		Sem & Stenn		Camille Cabaltera			Gabriele Esposito		Andrea Radice		Samuel Storm	No final showdown or judges' vote: results will be based on public votes alone		
Fedez's vote	-	Virginia Perbellini		Ros		Camille Cabaltera			Rita Bellanza		Andrea Radice		Ros	No final showdown or judges' vote: results will be based on public votes alone		
Levante's vote	-	Ros		Ros		Gabriele Esposito			Gabriele Esposito		Andrea Radice		Ros	No final showdown or judges' vote: results will be based on public votes alone		
Maionchi's vote	-	Ros		Sem & Stenn		Camille Cabaltera			Gabriele Esposito		Ros		Ros	No final showdown or judges' vote: results will be based on public votes alone		
Eliminated	Lorenzo Bonamano; Public vote to save	Virginia Perbellini; Public vote to save		Sem & Stenn; Public vote to save		Camille Cabaltera; 3 of 4 votes majority			Gabriele Esposito; 3 of 4 votes majority		Rita Bellanza; Public vote to save		Ros; 3 of 4 votes majority	Samuel Storm; 4th place	Enrico Nigiotti; 3rd place	Måneskin; Runner-up
Eliminated	Lorenzo Bonamano; Public vote to save	Virginia Perbellini; Public vote to save		Sem & Stenn; Public vote to save		Camille Cabaltera; 3 of 4 votes majority			Gabriele Esposito; 3 of 4 votes majority		Andrea Radice; 3 of 4 votes majority		Ros; 3 of 4 votes majority	Samuel Storm; 4th place	Enrico Nigiotti; 3rd place	Lorenzo Licitra; Winner

=== Live show details ===
==== Week 1 (26 October) ====
- Celebrity performers: Ibeyi ("No Man is Big Enough for My Arms" and "River") and J-Ax ("Sconosciuti da una vita" (with Fedez))

Contestants' performances on the first live show
Act	Order	Song	Result
Måneskin	1	"Let's Get It Started"	Safe
Enrico Nigiotti	2	"La canzone dei vecchi amanti"	Safe
Camille Cabaltera	3	"Team"	Safe
Gabriele Esposito	4	"Adam's Song"	Bottom three
Sem & Stenn	5	"Let's Go to Bed"	Safe
Lorenzo Bonamano	6	"High Hopes"	Bottom three
Lorenzo Licitra	7	"Your Song"	Safe
Virginia Perbellini	8	"Thank U"	Safe
Ros	9	"Battito di ciglia"	Safe
Samuel Storm	10	"Location"	Saved
Rita Bellanza	11	"Le rondini"	Safe
Andrea Radice	12	"Superstition"	Safe
Final showdown details
Act	Order	Song	Result
Gabriele Esposito	13	"Ain't No Sunshine"	Safe
Lorenzo Bonamano	14	"Radioactive"	Eliminated

==== Week 2 (2 November) ====
- Celebrity performers: Sam Smith ("Stay with Me" and "Too Good at Goodbyes") and Dua Lipa ("New Rules")

Contestants' performances on the second live show
Part 1
Act	Order	Song	Result
Enrico Nigiotti	1	"Quelli che benpensano"	Safe
Sem & Stenn	2	"The Dope Show"	Safe
Rita Bellanza	3	"La verità"	Safe
Gabriele Esposito	4	"The Judge"	Safe
Måneskin	5	"Beggin'"	Safe
Virginia Perbellini	6	"Dog Days Are Over"	Bottom two
Part 2
Act	Order	Song	Result
Andrea Radice	7	"Make It Rain"	Safe
Ros	8	"Fiori d'arancio"	Bottom two
Samuel Storm	9	"Unsteady"	Safe
Camille Cabaltera	10	"Chandelier"	Safe
Lorenzo Licitra	11	"Miserere"	Safe
Final showdown details
Act	Order	Song	Result
Virginia Perbellini	12	"Rise Up"	Eliminated
Ros	13	"Svalutation"	Safe

Judges' votes to eliminate

- Agnelli: Virginia Perbellini - backed his own act, Ros
- Fedez: Virginia Perbellini - gave no reason.
- Levante: Ros - backed her own act, Virginia Perbellini
- Maionchi: Ros - could not decide so chose to take it to deadlock.

With the acts in the sing-off receiving two votes each, the result was deadlock and a new public vote commenced for 200 seconds. Virginia Perbellini was eliminated as the act with the fewest public votes.

==== Week 3 (9 November) ====
- Celebrity performers: Michele Bravi ("Il diario degli errori" and "Tanto per cominciare") and Harry Styles ("Sign of the Times")

Contestants' performances on the third live show
Part 1
Act	Order	Song	Result
Camille Cabaltera	1	"Royals"	Safe
Ros	2	"Supermassive Black Hole"	Bottom two
Lorenzo Licitra	3	"Sere nere"	Safe
Samuel Storm	4	"Super Rich Kids"	Safe
Måneskin	5	"Somebody Told Me"	Safe
Part 2
Act	Order	Song	Result
Rita Bellanza	6	"Lost on You"	Safe
Enrico Nigiotti	7	"Il Mio Nemico"	Safe
Sem & Stenn	8	"Electric Feel"	Bottom two
Gabriele Esposito	9	"Growing Up"	Safe
Andrea Radice	10	"I Need a Dollar"	Safe
Final showdown details
Act	Order	Song	Result
Ros	11	"Nessuno mi può giudicare"	Safe
Sem & Stenn	12	"This Is Not a Love Song"	Eliminated

Judges' votes to eliminate

- Maionchi: Sem & Stenn - gave no reason.
- Levante: Ros - gave no reason.
- Fedez: Ros - gave no reason.
- Agnelli: Sem & Stenn - could not decide between his two acts so chose to take it to deadlock.

With the acts in the sing-off receiving two votes each, the result went to deadlock and reverted to the earlier public vote. Sem & Stenn were eliminated as the act with the fewest public votes.

==== Week 4 (16 November) ====
- Celebrity performers: Afterhours ("Bianca") and Gianni Morandi ("Dobbiamo fare luce")

Contestants' performances on the fourth live show
Part 1
Act	Order	Song	Result
Camille Cabaltera	1	"Sorry Not Sorry"	Bottom three
Samuel Storm	2	"A Song for You"	Safe
Lorenzo Licitra	3	"Nothing Else Matters"	Safe
Part 2
Act	Order	Song	Result
Rita Bellanza	4	"La donna cannone"	Bottom three
Ros	5	"Why'd You Only Call Me When You're High?"	Safe
Enrico Nigiotti	6	"Make You Feel My Love"	Safe
Part 3
Act	Order	Song	Result
Måneskin	7	"Un temporale"	Safe
Andrea Radice	8	"Love Me Again"/"Get Lucky"	Safe
Gabriele Esposito	9	"Hotel California"	Bottom three
Final showdown details
Act	Order	Song	Result
Camille Cabaltera	1	"Bang Bang"	Eliminated
Rita Bellanza	2	"Sally"	Saved
Gabriele Esposito	3	"The Man Who Can't Be Moved"	Safe

Judges' votes to eliminate

- Fedez: Camille Cabaltera - backed his own act, Gabriele Esposito.
- Levante: Gabriele Esposito - backed her own act, Camille Cabaltera.
- Agnelli: Camille Cabaltera - believed that Esposito had a better record path.
- Maionchi: Camille Cabaltera - felt that Esposito had more potential.

==== Week 5 (23 November) ====
- Theme: Previously unreleased songs (Round 1), Artists top sellers (Round 2)
- Celebrity performers: Negramaro ("Solo 3 minuti"/"Estate"/"L'immenso"/"Nuvole e lenzuola" (with the contestants) and "Fino all'Imbrunire")

Contestants' performances on the fifth live show
Round 1
Act	Order	Song	Result
Lorenzo Licitra	1	"In the Name of Love"	Safe
Gabriele Esposito	2	"Limits"	Bottom two
Måneskin	3	"Chosen"	Safe
Andrea Radice	4	"Lascia che sia"	Safe
Rita Bellanza	5	"Le parole che non dico mai"	Safe
Samuel Storm	6	"The Story"	Safe
Ros	7	"Rumore"	Safe
Enrico Nigiotti	8	"L'amore è"	Safe
Round 2
Act	Order	Song	Result
Samuel Storm	9	"Rolling in the Deep"	Safe
Ros	10	"Song 2"	Safe
Rita Bellanza	11	"Águas de março"	Bottom two
Andrea Radice	12	"Can't Stop the Feeling!"	Safe
Lorenzo Licitra	13	"Somebody That I Used to Know"	Safe
Måneskin	14	"Take Me Out"	Safe
Enrico Nigiotti	15	"L'isola che non c'è"	Safe
Final showdown details
Act	Order	Song	Result
Gabriele Esposito	16	"When We Were Young"	Eliminated
Rita Bellanza	17	"Le rondini"	Safe

Judges' votes to eliminate

- Fedez: Rita Bellanza - backed his own act, Gabriele Esposito.
- Levante: Gabriele Esposito - backed her own act, Rita Bellanza.
- Agnelli: Gabriele Esposito - believed that Bellanza had more potential.
- Maionchi: Gabriele Esposito - thought that Bellanza's performances were the best.

==== Week 6: Quarter-final (30 November) ====
- Celebrity performer: Noel Gallagher's High Flying Birds ("Don't Look Back in Anger" and "Holy Mountain")

Contestants' performances on the sixth live show
Round 1
Act	Order	Song	Result
Ros	1	"Killing in the Name"	Safe
Enrico Nigiotti	2	"Mi fido di te"	Safe
Samuel Storm	3	"She's on My Mind"	Safe
Andrea Radice	4	"Diamante"	Safe
Måneskin	5	"Flow"	Safe
Rita Bellanza	6	"In questo misero show"	Eliminated
Lorenzo Licitra	7	"Who Wants to Live Forever"	Safe
Round 2
Act	Order	Song	Result
Enrico Nigiotti	8	"Vento d'estate"	Safe
Samuel Storm	9	"Say Something"	Safe
Lorenzo Licitra	10	"Million Reasons"	Safe
Ros	11	"Future Starts Slow"	Bottom two
Andrea Radice	12	"Transformer"	Bottom two
Måneskin	13	"Kiss This"	Safe
Final showdown details
Act	Order	Song	Result
Ros	14	"L'unica cosa"	Saved
Andrea Radice	15	"Recovery"	Eliminated

Judge's vote to eliminate

- Agnelli: Andrea Radice - backed his own act, Ros.
- Maionchi: Ros - backed her own act, Andrea Radice.
- Levante: Andrea Radice - recognized the improvement in Ros.
- Fedez: Andrea Radice - felt that Ros had more potential.

==== Week 7: Semi-final (7 December) ====
Contestants' performances on the seventh live show
Act	Order	First song	Order	Second song	Result
Samuel Storm	1	"The Story"	8	"Stand By Me"	Bottom two
Ros	2	"Rumore"	7	"Acida"	Bottom two
Enrico Nigiotti	3	"L'amore è"	6	"Redemption Song"	Safe
Måneskin	4	"Chosen"	10	"You're Nobody 'Til Somebody Loves You"	Safe
Lorenzo Licitra	5	"In the Name of Love"	9	"Diamonds"	Safe
Final showdown details
Act		Order		Song	Result
Ros		11		"I Only Lie When I Love You"	Eliminated
Samuel Storm		12		"Freedom"	Saved

Judges' vote to eliminate

- Agnelli: Samuel Storm - backed his own act, Ros.
- Fedez: Ros - backed his own act, Samuel Storm.
- Levante: Ros - found Storm's vocals more interesting.
- Maionchi: Ros - gave no reason.

==== Week 8: Final (14 December) ====
Celebrity guest artists: James Arthur (duet with each finalist), Tiziano Ferro, Ed Sheeran.

Contestants' performances on the final live show
Round 1
Act	Order	Song	Result
Samuel Storm	1	"Naked"	4th place
Lorenzo Licitra	2	"Impossible"	Safe
Måneskin	3	"Prisoner"	Safe
Enrico Nigiotti	4	"Say You Won't Let Go"	Safe
Round 2
Act	Order	Song	Result
Måneskin	5	"Beggin'"/"Take Me Out"/"Somebody Told Me"	Safe
Enrico Nigiotti	6	"Make You Feel My Love"/"Il mio nemico" /"Mi fido di te"	3rd place
Lorenzo Licitra	7	"Your Song"/"Million Reasons"/"Who Wants to Live Forever"	Safe
Round 3
Act	Order	Song	Result
Lorenzo Licitra	8	"In the Name of Love"	Winner
Måneskin	9	"Chosen"	Runner-up
