= Morgan (singer) =

Italian musician

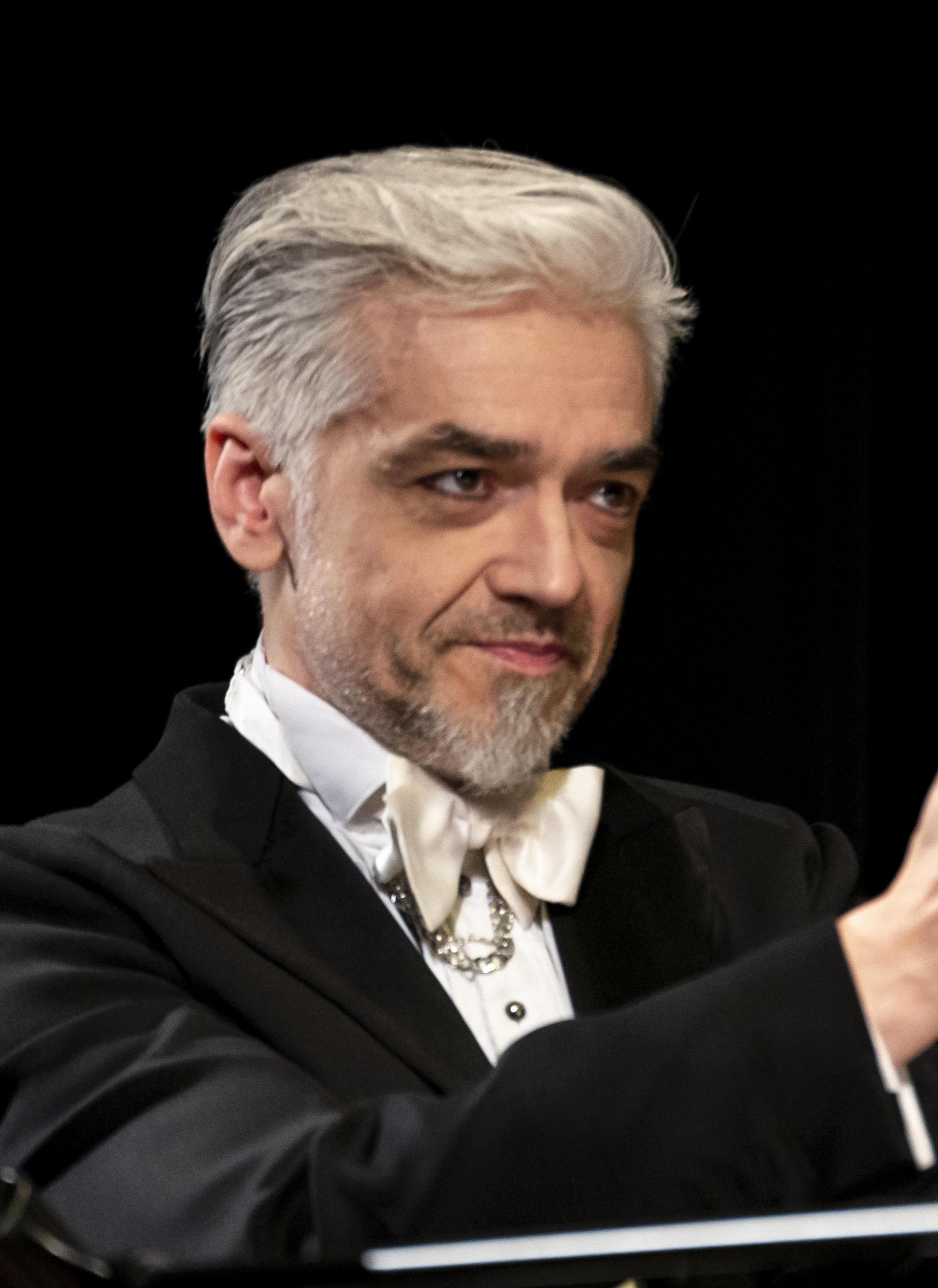
- Morgan in 2023

Background information
- Born: Marco Castoldi; 23 December 1972 (age 53); Milan, Italy
- Genres: Alternative rock; electronic rock; experimental rock; synth-pop
- Occupations: Singer; songwriter; musician
- Instruments: Vocals; bass; piano; keyboards; guitars; ukulele; harmonica; glockenspiel
- Member of: Bluvertigo

Marco Castoldi (born 23 December 1972), better known by his stage name Morgan, is an Italian singer, songwriter and musician. His musical genres are mainly alternative rock and electronic rock, sometimes experimental rock and synth-pop. He has also been a judge for eight seasons in the Italian version of The X Factor, winning five of them through acts he mentored: Aram Quartet (series 1 – 2008), Matteo Becucci (series 2 – 2008–9), Marco Mengoni (series 3 – 2009), Chiara Galiazzo (series 6 – 2012) and Michele Bravi (series 7 – 2013). He was also a coach on The Voice of Italy in 2019.

He is also a founding member of Bluvertigo, an Italian band formed in 1992. Morgan has 3 daughters; the first, Anna Lou Castoldi, with Asia Argento.

== Discography ==
=== Solo ===
- 2003: Canzoni dell'appartamento
- 2004: Il suono della vanità
- 2005: Non al denaro, non all'amore né al cielo
- 2007: Da A ad A
- 2008: È successo a Morgan
- 2009: Italian Songbook Volume 1
- 2010: Morganicomio
- 2012: Italian Songbook Volume 2
- 2020: La musica seria
- 2023: ...e quindi, insomma ossia

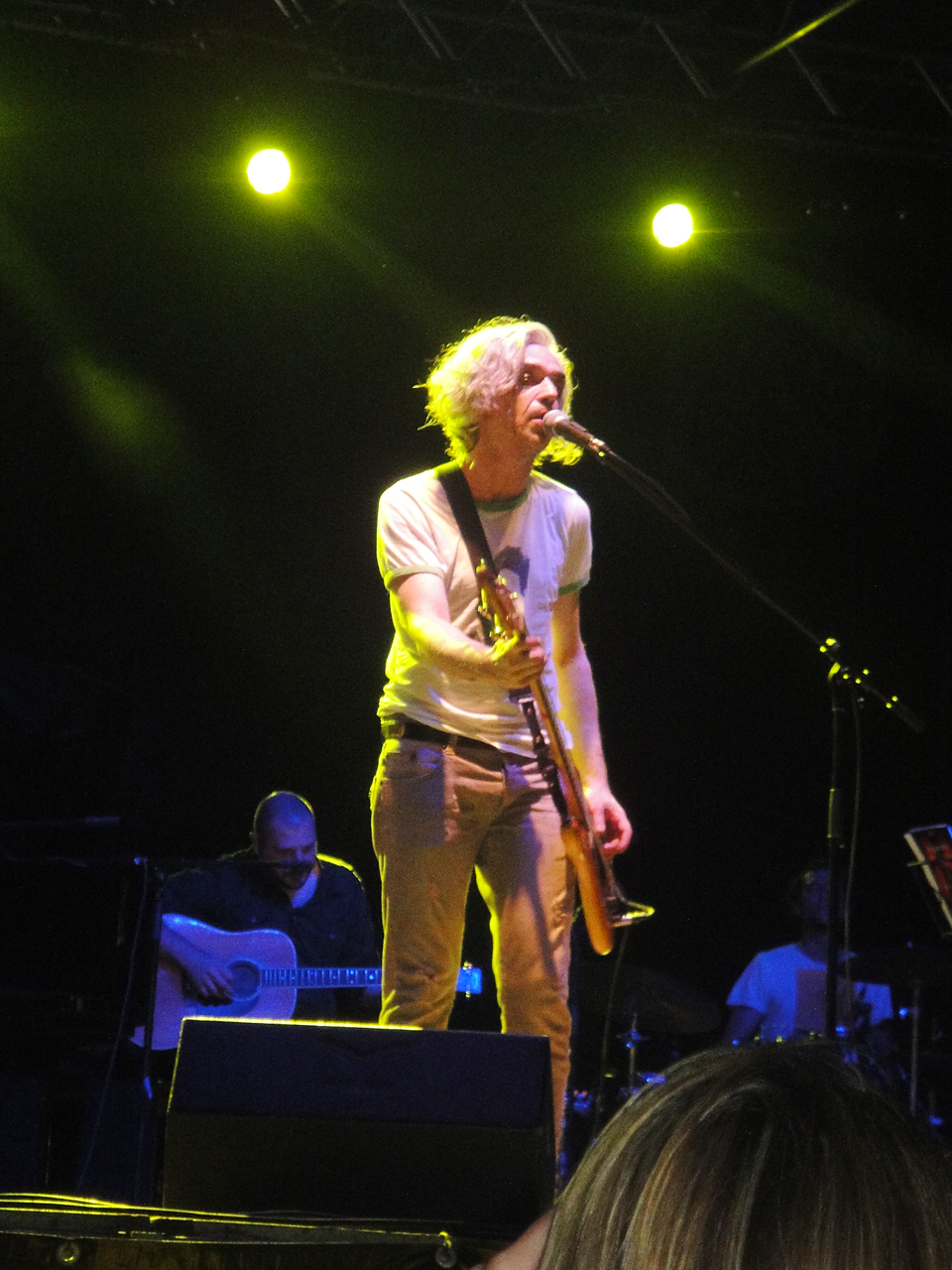
Morgan live concert at the Cathedral of Asti (Italy) – 15 July 2011

=== With Bluvertigo ===
Studio Albums

- 1995: Acidi e basi
- 1997: Metallo non metallo
- 1999: Zero - ovvero la famosa nevicata dell'85

Greatest Hits

- 2001: Pop Tools

Live albums

- 2008: MTV Storytellers

=== Collaborations ===
- Franco Battiato in album Gommalacca
- Antonella Ruggiero in Registrazioni moderne
- Alice in her albums Exit, Personal Juke Box and Viaggio in Italia
- Subsonica in Discoteca Labirinto
- Cristina Donà in album Nido
- Paola & Chiara in Arsenico
- Mauro Pagani in Parole a caso
- Banco del Mutuo Soccorso in No palco
- Modena City Ramblers in Appunti partigiani
- Patty Pravo in Il vento e le rose
- Artisti uniti per l'Abruzzo in Domani 21/04.09
- Bugo in Sincero

=== Producer ===
- Mao in Black Mokette
- Soerba in Playback
- La Sintesi in L'eroe romantico
- Aram Quartet in the song Chi (Who)

== Filmography ==
=== Film ===
Year	Title	Role(s)	Notes
2003	Lost Love	Bassist	Uncredited
2004	The Vanity Serum	Cat-Man	Cameo
2006	Il quarto sesso	Karl Marx	
2006	Transylvania	Milan Agustin	

=== Television ===
Year	Title	Role(s)	Notes
2001	Sanremo Music Festival 2001	Himself / Contestant	Performing "L'assenzio" (16th place)
2008–2014; 2023	X Factor	Himself / Judge	Talent show (1–3, 5–8, 17)
2010	Le invasioni barbariche	Himself / Guest	Talk show
2013	MTV Spit	Himself / Judge	Talent show (season 2)
2016	Sanremo Music Festival 2016	Himself / Contestant	Performing "Semplicemente" (16th place)
2016	Amici di Maria De Filippi	Himself / Judge	Talent show (season 15, final stage)
2017	Amici di Maria De Filippi	Himself / Coach	Talent show (season 16, final stage)
2017–2019	Premio Tenco	Himself / Host	Annual ceremony
2019	Sanremo Music Festival 2019	Himself / Guest performer	Performing with Achille Lauro in the duets night
2019	The Voice of Italy	Himself / Coach	Talent show (season 6)
2020	Sanremo Music Festival 2020	Himself / Contestant	Performing "Sincero" with Bugo (disqualified)
2020	Sanremo Giovani	Himself / Judge	Talent show
2021	Ballando con le Stelle	Himself / Contestant	Reality competition (season 16)
2023	StraMorgan	Himself / Host	Variety show

== Bibliography ==
- 1998: Dissoluzione (Bompiani - I buchi neri)
- 2008: In pArte Morgan (Eleuthera)
- 2014: "Il libro di Morgan - Io l'Amore la Musica gli Stronzi e Dio" (Einaudi stile libero)
- 2022: Parole d'aMorgan (with Pasquale Panella)
