= Urban Strangers =

Italian musical duo

- Origin: Somma Vesuviana, Campania, Italy
- Years active: 2012–2020
- Label: Sony Music
- Past members: Gennaro Raia; Alessio Iodice

The Urban Strangers were an Italian musical duo formed by Gennaro Raia and Alessio Iodice.

== History ==
The duo, active since 2012, achieved success after participating in the ninth edition of the Italian X Factor in 2015, where they finished in second place. Signed to Sony Music, they released their debut studio album Runaway, which was certified gold, featuring the eponymous single that topped the FIMI Singles Chart and achieved platinum certification.

In 2016, they released their second album Detachment. In 2018, they launched their first single in Italian, "Non so", which preceded the album U.S, released on 7 September. In March 2020, they announced a hiatus from their musical project.

In March 2025, Raia debuted as a solo artist under the name Genn Butch.

== Discography ==
=== Studio albums ===
List of studio albums, with details and chart positions
Title	Album details	Peak chart positions	Certifications
Title	Album details	ITA	Certifications
Runaway	Released: 11 December 2015; Label: Sony Music	6	FIMI: Gold
Detachment	Released: 14 October 2016; Label: Sony Music	4	
U.S	Released: 7 September 2018; Label: Sony Music	31	

=== EPs ===
List of extended plays, with details and chart positions
Title	EP details	Peak chart positions
Title	EP details	ITA
Urban Strangers	Released: 15 June 2015; Label: Casa Lavica; Format: CD, digital download	16

=== Singles ===
Song	Year	Peak positions	Certifications	Album
Song	Year	ITA	Certifications	Album
"Runaway"	2015	1	FIMI: Platinum	Runaway
"Last Part"	2016	57		Runaway
"Bones"	2016	—		Detachment
"Stronger"	2017	—		Detachment
"Non so"	2018	—		U.S
"Non andrò via"	2018	—		U.S

=== Other charted songs ===
Title	Year	Peak chart positions	Album
Title	Year	ITA	Album
"Cupid's Chokehold"	2015	34	Runaway
"Oceans"	2015	25	Runaway
"Rape Me"	2015	66	Runaway
