= Lorenzo Licitra =

Italian singer (born 1991)

- Born: 25 September 1991 (age 34); Ragusa, Sicily, Italy
- Genres: Pop
- Occupation: Singer
- Years active: 2017–present
- Label: Sony Music (2017–present)

Lorenzo Licitra (born 25 September 1991) is an Italian singer, best known for winning the eleventh season of the Italian talent show X Factor in 2017. His debut single, "In the Name of Love", was released on 24 November 2017.

== Discography ==
=== Extended plays ===
List of extended plays, with chart positions and certifications
Title	EP details	Peak chart positions
Title	EP details	ITA
In the Name of Love	Released: 8 December 2017; Label: Sony Music; Format: CD, digital download	24
"—" denotes an item that did not chart in that country.

=== Singles ===
List of singles, with chart positions, album name and certifications
Single	Year	Peak chart positions	Album or EP
Single	Year	ITA	Album or EP
"In the Name of Love"	2017	37	In the Name of Love
"Sai che ti ho pensato sempre"	2019	—	Non-album singles
"Eli Hallo" (featuring Anggun)	2022	—	Non-album singles
"Never Give Up"	2023	—	Non-album singles
"Libero"	2023	—	Non-album singles
"Il mio giusto momento"	2024	—	Non-album singles
"Relax"	2024	—	Non-album singles
"Come musica"	2024	—	Non-album singles
"—" denotes an item that did not chart in that country.

Awards and achievements
Preceded by Soul System	Italian X Factor; Winner; 2017	Succeeded by Anastasio
