= Matteo Becucci =

Italian pop singer and musician

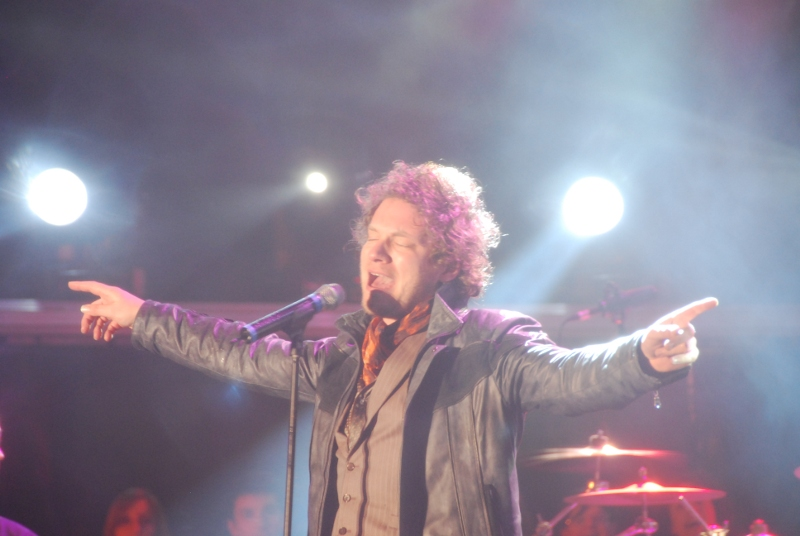
- Matteo Becucci in Trento, 27 April 2009

Background information
- Born: Matteo Becucci; 4 August 1970 (age 56)
- Genres: Pop
- Occupations: Singer, songwriter
- Instruments: Guitar, voice
- Years active: 1994–2011
- Labels: RCA Italy, Sony Music Italy
- Website: www.matteobecucciofficial.com

Matteo Becucci (born in Livorno on 4 August 1970) is an Italian pop singer and musician, best known for winning the second season of the X Factor reality singing contest in 2009.

== Biography ==
In 1990, aged 20, he made his debut with performances in the province of Livorno, accompanied by Richard Towers and Claudio Fabiani. Three years later he joined the group "Rien à faire", who disbanded in 1995. Between 1994 and 1995, he opened some concerts for Sergio Caputo. In 1995 he formed a duo with Franco Ceccanti, the '"Check-Back", disbanded in 1997, when Becucci began working with Mr. Pitiful Soul Band, then finished in 2006. Come in 2000 he released Come una cosa andrò for the soundtrack of the film Non come un bang by Mariano Lamberti. In 2003 he released the album Liberi di mente the singer's first album, Leghorn. From 2007 he was the male voice of "Bubbles Montenisa Band, a 10 piece group, with whom he collaborated until 2008.

In 2008 he was selected by Morgan to take part at the second Italian season of X Factor, during the final he interpret the single Impossibile, co-written by Belgian X Factor winner Udo Mechels. On 19 April 2009 is proclaimed winner of X Factor for just 16 votes more than The Bastard Sons of Dioniso, winning a contract with Sony Music in the value of 300,000 €. On 24 April 2009, after winning X Factor, he released his first EP: Impossible, which takes its title from the single released and won the gold.

From 23 October 2009 take part on the radio programming the single Ti troverò, in Italian rehabilitation of I Did not Know the PhD, which anticipates the release of the album 13 November 2009 Cioccolato amaro e caffè. Are extracted two more singles from the album: Cioccolato amaro e caffè and Sei unica (the last single is a cover of the Michael Bublé's song Everything. With the latest work, the singer does not repeat the success with the EP, released during the final of X Factor; decides to introduce a song for the Festival di Sanremo 2010 but is excluded. In 2010 he decided to try the musical: plays the role of Judas in the musical Jesus Christ Superstar.

== Discography ==
=== Albums ===
- 2003: Liberi di mente
- 2009: Cioccolato amaro e caffè (reached #27)
- 2011: Matteo Becucci

=== EPs ===
- 2009: Impossibile (reached #5)

=== Singles ===
- 2009: "Impossibile" (reached #2)
- 2009: "Ti troverò"
- 2010: "Cioccolato amaro e caffè"
- 2010: "Sei unica"
- 2011: "La cucina Giapponese"
- 2013: "Fammi dormire"

Preceded by Aram Quartet	X Factor (Italy); Winner; 2008–2009	Succeeded by Marco Mengoni
