= Cielo (TV channel) =

Italian television channel

- Country: Italy
- Broadcast area: Italy; Switzerland

Programming
- Language: Italian
- Picture format: 576i (SDTV); 1080i (HDTV)

Ownership
- Owner: Sky Italia
- Sister channels: TV8; Sky TG24

History
- Launched: 16 December 2009

Links
- Website: www.cielotv.it

Availability

Terrestrial
- Digital: Channel 26 (HD)

Streaming media
- cielotv.it: Watch live

Cielo (Italian for 'sky'; stylised as cielo) is an Italian free-to-air television channel owned by Sky Italia aimed towards young audiences, and is available on digital terrestrial television and on Sky satellite television platform. Originally planned to be launched on 1 December 2009, it was delayed to 16 December 2009.

Cielo mainly airs reruns of programs aired on Sky premium channels, similarly to Sky UK's counterpart Sky Mix. However, it also simulcasts Sky TG24 news bulletins.

As of 15th September 2025, Cielo is being transmitted in HD on all platforms along with Sky TG24.

Sky Italia has broadcast the coverage of the XXII Olympic Winter Games in Sochi (in which Sky owned broadcasting rights for Italy) free-to-air on the channel.
