= TV8 (Italian TV channel) =

Italian television station

- Country: Italy
- Broadcast area: Italy; Switzerland
- Network: Sky Italia

Programming
- Language: Italian
- Picture format: 576i (SDTV); 1080i (HDTV)

Ownership
- Owner: Sky Italia
- Sister channels: Cielo; Sky TG24

History
- Launched: 1 August 2015; 11 years ago
- Replaced: MTV (DTT)
- Former names: MTV8 (2015–2016)

Links
- Website: www.tv8.it

Availability

Terrestrial
- Digital: Channels 8 (HD), 108 and 508 (SD)

TV8 is a digital-terrestrial free-to-air Italian general entertainment TV channel owned by Sky Italia. The channel is allocated at number 8 of the Italian virtual channel list.

== History ==
On 31 July 2015 Sky Italia took over ownership of the free-to-air MTV Italy. On 14 September 2015, MTV Italy was rebranded as MTV8 by Sky Italia.

On the same day, Viacom launched a new MTV-channel for Italy, MTV Next (now MTV), and is now only available as a subscription service on Sky. This ended an era where MTV Italy was available to the majority of homes across Italy free-to-air. The Music-station of Viacom in Italy, MTV Music remained available free to air until 1 July 2016, when it moved to Sky Italia.

=== Birth of TV8 ===
On 8 January 2016, Sky introduced new on-air graphics for MTV8 focusing on the number 8 and launched the channel's website.

On 18 February 2016, Sky changed the channel's name to TV8.

== Programming ==
TV8 is Sky's main barker channel. The channel's programming mainly broadcasts, like Sky Mix, reruns of Sky programmes, comedy shows, crime shows, movies, but also some sport, such as UEFA Europa League and UEFA Champions League matches with no Italian teams at all, delayed MotoGP and Formula 1, live Superbike World Championship, and very few original shows.

=== Documentaries ===
- Affari legali
- Baby Animals - Cuccioli petalosi
- Body Shock
- Cheaters - Tradimenti
- Cold blood: nuove verità
- Coppie che uccidono
- Eredità da star
- Finché morte non ci separi
- Finding My Father
- I'm a Stripper
- Intervention - Noi ti salveremo
- Istinto killer
- Lady Killer
- La dottoressa Garavaglia
- Mamme sull'orlo di una crisi da ballo
- Matrimonio a prima vista USA
- Nato per uccidere
- Non volevo è stata colpa sua
- Scandali ad Hollywood
- Stalker: attrazione fatale
- The Impostors - Le vite degli altri
- Vanity Fair Confidential

=== Show ===
- Cucine da Incubo Italia (Kitchen Nightmares Italy)
- Hell's Kitchen USA
- Hell's Kitchen Italia (st. 2+)
- House of Gag
- Italia's Got Talent (st. 7+)
- Planet's Got Talent
- TuttiGiorni's Got Talent
- Squadre da incubo
- Singing in the car
- Top 20 Countdowns
- X Factor
