= Totem (disambiguation) =

A totem is a spirit embodied in an object that watches over a group of people.

Totem may also refer to:

== Arts, entertainment and media ==
=== Film and theatre ===
- Totem (Cirque du Soleil), a show premiering in Montréal in May 2010
- Totem (film), a 2017 American supernatural horror film
- Tótem (film), a 2023 Mexican drama film
- Totem, an object that allows the user to distinguish dreams from reality in the 2010 film Inception

=== Music ===
- Tótem (band), an Uruguayan band formed in the early 1970s
- "Totem", a song on the 1996 Rush album Test for Echo

==== Albums ====
- Totem (Zazie album), 2007
- Totem (Satyr album), 2022
- Totem (Soulfly album)
- Totem, a series of albums by Italian rapper En?gma
  - Totem – Episodio uno, the first part
  - Totem – Episodio due, the second part
  - Totem – Episodio tre, the third part
  - Totem – Episodio quattro, the fourth part

=== Sculptures ===
- Totem (Paluzzi), a sculpture by artist Rinaldo Paluzzi
- Totem pole, a monumental sculpture carved from trees
- Festival totem, identification staffs built for music festivals

=== Other media ===
- Totems (video game), a video game for the Xbox 360 and PC
- The Totem, a 1979 novel by David Morrell (writer)
- Totem (poetry collection), a 2004 poetry collection by Luke Davies

== Science and technology ==
- Totem (software), a free software media player for the GNOME computer desktop environment
- TOTEM experiment, an experiment at the CERN Large Hadron Collider
- Totem pole output, a kind of electronic circuit

== Other uses ==
- Aerodyne Totem Bi, a French two-place paraglider design
- Operation Totem, a pair of British atmospheric nuclear tests in Australia
- Tote'm Stores, the original name of 7-Eleven convenience stores

== See also ==
- Totem pole (disambiguation)
