= Sofia Tornambene =

Italian singer

Kimono
- Born: Sofia Tornambene; 12 September 2002 (age 24); Civitanova Marche, Italy
- Genre: Pop
- Occupation: Singer
- Years active: 2019–present
- Label: Sony Music (2019–present)

Sofia Tornambene (born 12 September 2002), also known as Kimono, is an Italian singer. She is best known for winning the thirteenth season of the Italian talent show X Factor.

== Early life ==
Sofia Tornambene was born in 2002 in Civitanova Marche.

== Career ==
=== 2019–2023: X Factor Italia and career debut ===
In February 2019, Tornambene participated in Sanremo Young, finishing third. She won the thirteenth edition of the Italian version of the X Factor in December 2019 with her single "A domani per sempre", whiche entered the Italian singles chart.

She released her second single "Ruota panoramica" on 24 April 2020. During the summer, she recorded three acoustic songs ("Tra l'asfalto e le nuvole", "Finali imprevisti", "Fiori viola") at RCA Studio Sessions. On 10 December 2020, she launched her new single "Solo" performing live at the finale of the fourteenth edition of X Factor. Her debut EP Dance Mania: Stereo Love was released on 15 October 2021 by Columbia and Sony Music.

=== 2023–present: Kimono ===
In 2023, after a two-year hiatus, she released two singles, "Tempesta" and "In ostaggio", under the name Kimono. A third single, "Piena di se", was released on 19 April 2024.

In late 2024, Kimono participated in Area Sanremo, a contest for young musicians partly used as a selection for the Sanremo Music Festival 2025, and was proclaimed one of the ten winners on 22 November 2024. She was ultimately not selected for the final stage. Two years later, she was one of the winners of Area Sanremo 2026, but once again did not advance to the televised stage.

== Discography ==
=== Extended plays ===
List of extended plays, with chart positions and certifications
| Title | EP details | Peak chart positions |
| Title | EP details | ITA |
|---|---|---|
| Dance Mania: Stereo Love | Released: 15 October 2021; Label: Columbia, Sony Music; Format: digital download | — |
"—" denotes an item that did not chart in that country.

=== Singles ===
List of singles, with chart positions, album name and certifications
| Single | Year | Peak chart positions | Album or EP |
| Single | Year | ITA | Album or EP |
|---|---|---|---|
| "A domani per sempre" | 2019 | 27 | Non-album single |
| "Ruota panoramica" | 2020 | — | Non-album single |
| "Tra l'asfalto e le nuvole" | 2020 | — | Non-album single |
| "Finali imprevisti" | 2020 | — | Non-album single |
| "Fiori viola" | 2020 | — | Non-album single |
| "Solo" | 2020 | — | Non-album single |
| "Tempesta" | 2023 | — | Non-album single |
| "In ostaggio" | 2023 | — | Non-album single |
| "Piena di se" | 2024 | — | Non-album single |
| "Parafulmini" | 2024 | — | Non-album single |
| "Leggera" | 2024 | — | Non-album single |
| "Fuori tempo" | 2025 | — | Non-album single |
| "Niente di noi" | 2025 | — | Non-album single |
"—" denotes an item that did not chart in that country.

Awards and achievements
| Preceded by Anastasio | Italian X Factor; Winner; 2019 | Succeeded by Casadilego |
