= Bomaye =

Bomaye may refer to:

- "Bomaye" (Sleiman song), a 2016 song by Danish rapper Sleiman
- "Bomaye" (En?gma song), a 2020 song by Italian rapper En?gma
