= Blind (rapper) =

Italian rapper (born 2001)

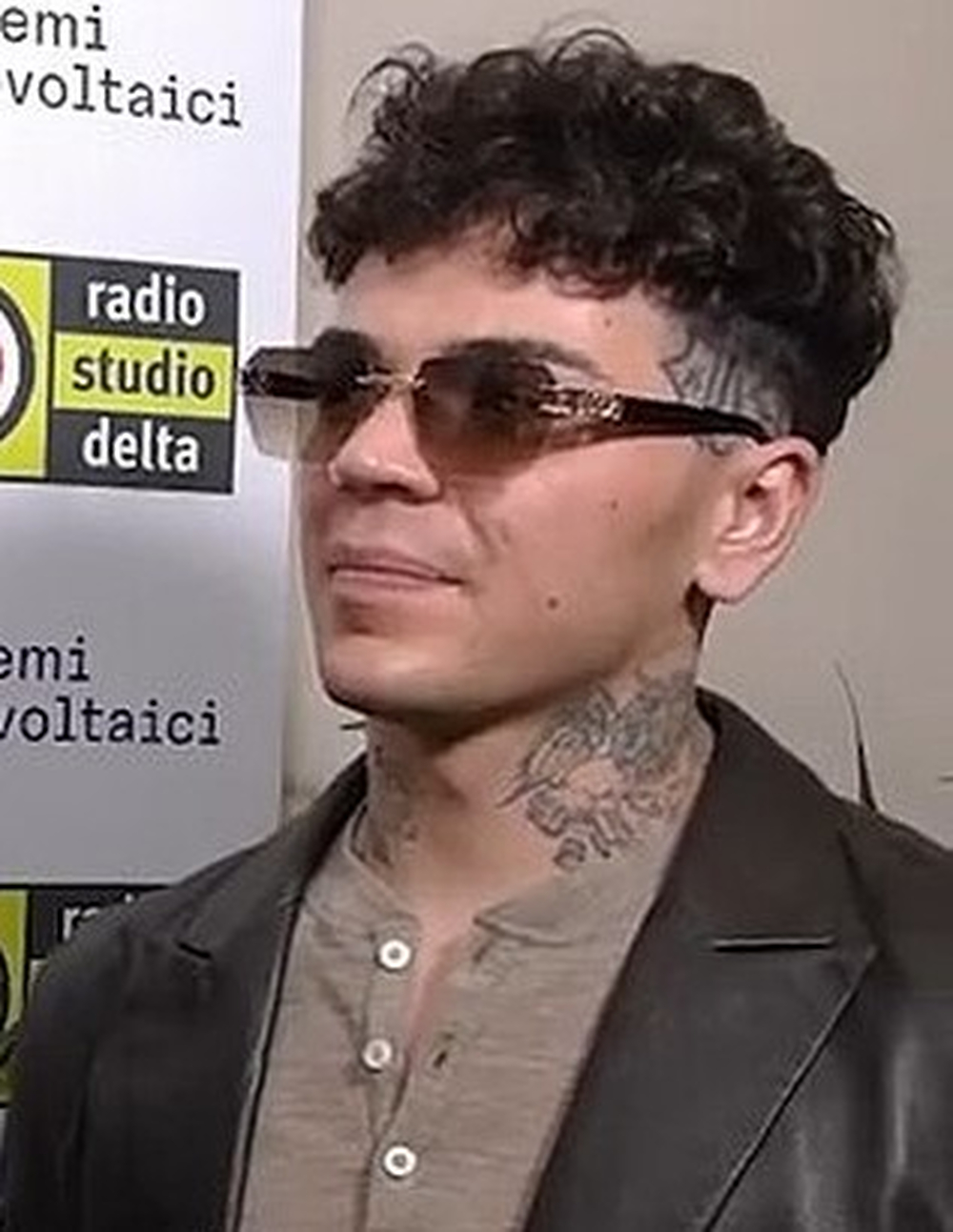
- Blind in February 2026

Background information
- Born: Franco Popi Rujan; 13 January 2000 (age 26); Perugia, Umbria, Italy
- Origin: Ponte San Giovanni, Perugia, Umbria, Italy
- Genres: Hip hop; pop rap
- Occupation: Rapper
- Instruments: Vocals
- Years active: 2017–present
- Label: Sony Music

Franco Popi Rujan (born 13 January 2000), better known as Blind, is an Italian rapper. He rose to fame in late 2020, when he took part in the fourteenth edition of Italian talent show X Factor, finishing in third place and achieving commercial success with the single "Cuore nero". The said single peaked at number 2 on the FIMI Single Chart and was certified platinum, denoting 70,000 equivalent units.

== Life and career ==
Blind was born to Romanian parents in Perugia and grew up in Ponte San Giovanni, a frazione of his hometown. After going through family issues, he cut ties with his father. He left school at the age of 15, and he admitted he later dealt and used drugs. Inspired by American artists whose lyrics described the suburbs they lived in, Blind started playing music at the age of 16. During his adolescence, he was charged multiple times for theft and brawl. The Juvenile court entrusted him to the association "Risorse & Talenti", which helped him to pursue his musical goals.

He chose to perform under the pseudonym "Blind", because "it means not looking at barriers, criticism, and everything that can hinder you". Since 2017, he started releasing songs online, including the track "Sotto 'sti palazzi". His first music video was self-produced, with financial help from his friends who collected money to support his music. In 2019, he released the single "Classe 2000", featuring Italian rapper Vacca. He also performed as an opening act for Italian rappers such as Izi, Rkomi, Tedua, and Drefgold.

During the summer of 2019, while working as a barman in Marina di Massa, he met Maurizio Laudicino, Pistoia Basket 2000's head of marketing. As a result, Blind composed and recorded the song "Jordan", filming a music video together with the basket team and performing the song live in Piazza del Duomo, Pistoia, as well as at PalaCarrara, during the season's opening match.

In 2020, he auditioned for the fourteenth series of Italian talent show X Factor, performing his original song "Cuore nero". He was chosen by his mentor Emma Marrone as one of the contestants in the "Boys" category. During the first live show, he performed "Cuore nero", which was immediately released as part of the X Factor Mixtape, together with all the contestants' original songs. The song was also released as a single on 30 October 2020. During the live shows, Blind also performed his own songs "Cicatrici" and "Affari tuoi", as well as reworked hits with original lyrics. After reaching the final, he ended up in third place, behind the series' winner Casadilego and runner-up band Little Pieces of Marmelade.

The single "Cuore nero" was certified gold before the final of the show, and went on to receive a platinum certification. An extended play with the same title was also released in December 2020, featuring studio recordings of six songs originally performed during X Factor, as well as a new original track, "Hola". A new song, titled "Promettimi", was recorded with fellow rappers Gué Pequeno and Nicola Siciliano, and released as a single on 24 February 2021. His autobiography, titled Cicatrici, was released in June 2021.

On 8 February 2022, Blind was announced as one of the ten established artists competing in the final of Una voce per San Marino. However, on 18 February, one day before the final, it was announced that he would withdraw from the contest for health reasons.

In a trio with El Ma and Soniko, Blind was among the ten winning acts of the Area Sanremo contest on 12 December 2025, and the following day the three were selected to compete in the Newcomers' section of the Sanremo Music Festival 2026. Their entry, titled "Nei miei DM", was eliminated in the semi-final.

== Discography ==
=== Extended plays ===
Title	Details	Peak chart positions
Title	Details	ITA
Cuore nero	Released: 11 December 2020; Label: Sony Music; Format: CD, digital download	19

=== Singles ===
Title	Year	Peak chart positions	Certifications	Album
Title	Year	ITA	Certifications	Album
"Cuore nero"	2020	2	FIMI: Platinum	Cuore nero
"Cicatrici"	2020	59		Cuore nero
"Affari tuoi"	2020	—		Cuore nero
"Promettimi" (featuring Gué Pequeno and Nicola Siciliano)	2021	—		Non-album singles
"Triste" (with Giaime)	2021	—		Non-album singles
"Popolari"	2021	—		Non-album singles
"Non mi perdo più"	2022	—		Non-album singles
"Non dormo da una settimana" (featuring Random)	2022	—		Non-album singles
"Corro veloce"	2022	—		Non-album singles
"Mala"	2024	—		Non-album singles
"Spento"	2025	—		Non-album singles
"Game Over"	2025	—		Non-album singles
"The Last Raider"	2025	—		Non-album singles
"Nei miei DM" (with El Ma and Soniko)	2025	67		Non-album singles
"—" denotes a recording that did not chart or was not released.

=== Featured singles ===
Title	Year
"Non cambi mai" (Mameli featuring Blind and Nashley)	2021

== Television programs ==
Year	Title	Network(s)	Notes
2020	X Factor	Sky Uno; Now; TV8	Contestant (season 14)
2022	L'isola dei famosi	Canale 5	Contestant (season 16)

== Bibliography ==
- Blind (2021). Cicatrici. Mondadori Electa. ISBN 978-8891832733.
