= Ferzetti =

Ferzetti is an Italian surname. Notable people with the surname include:

- Anna Ferzetti (born 1982), Italian actress
- Gabriele Ferzetti (1925–2015), Italian actor
