= Festival totem =

Identification staffs at music festivals

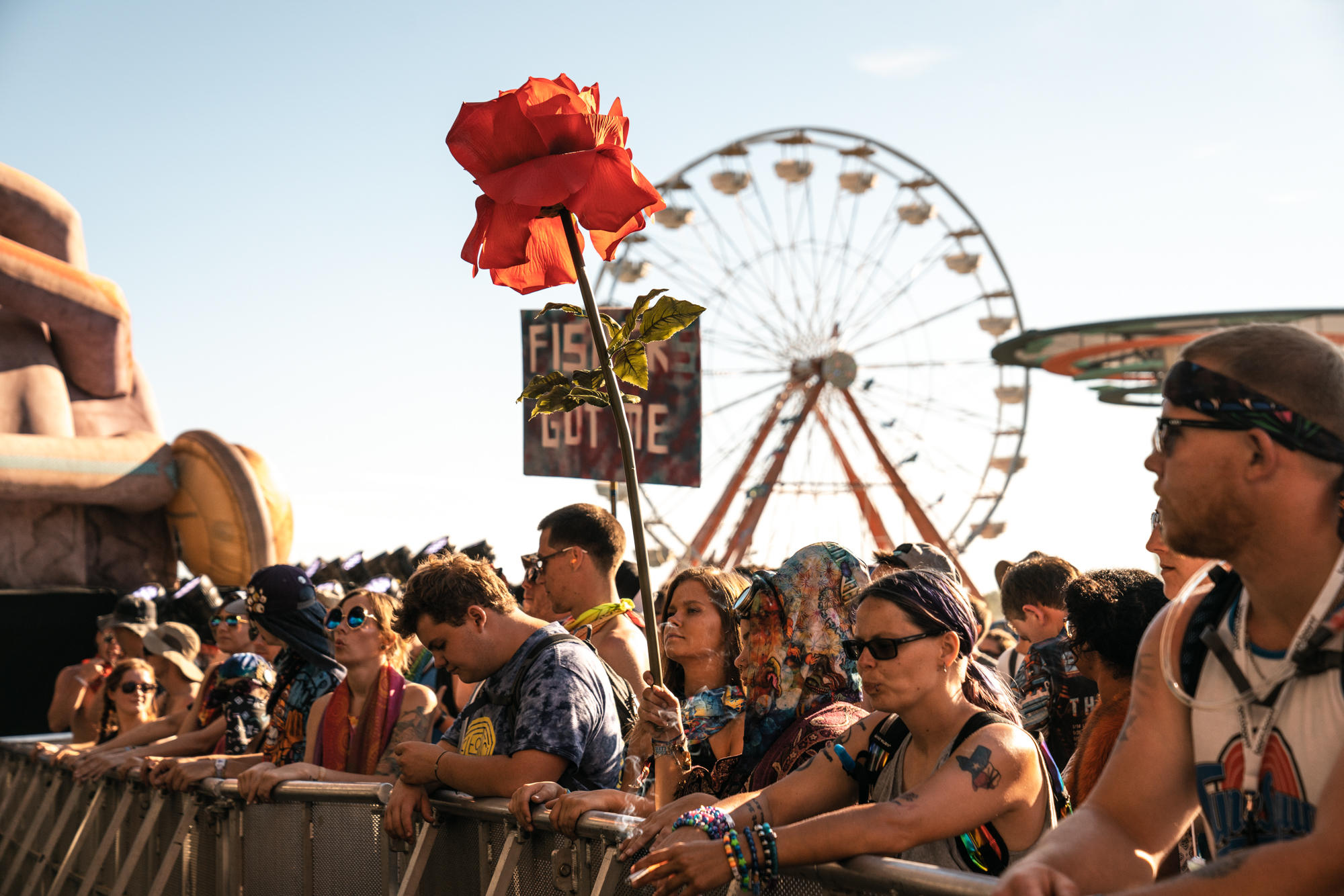
A flower totem in front of a sign totem at Electric Forest

Festival totems (sometimes known as doof sticks, rave totems, or rage sticks) are decorative objects, signs, toys, or symbols prominently displayed on poles by attendees at various music festivals and cultural events worldwide. Often seen in the crowds and campsites at large outdoor festivals, festival totems serve various purposes, ranging from artistic expression to utilitarian practical navigation and communication in large crowds. Typically, totems are DIY projects created by festival attendees, which are made from a variety of crafting materials and updated to reference current events, memes, music, or a festival, but have also recently become available to purchase online from totem creation companies.

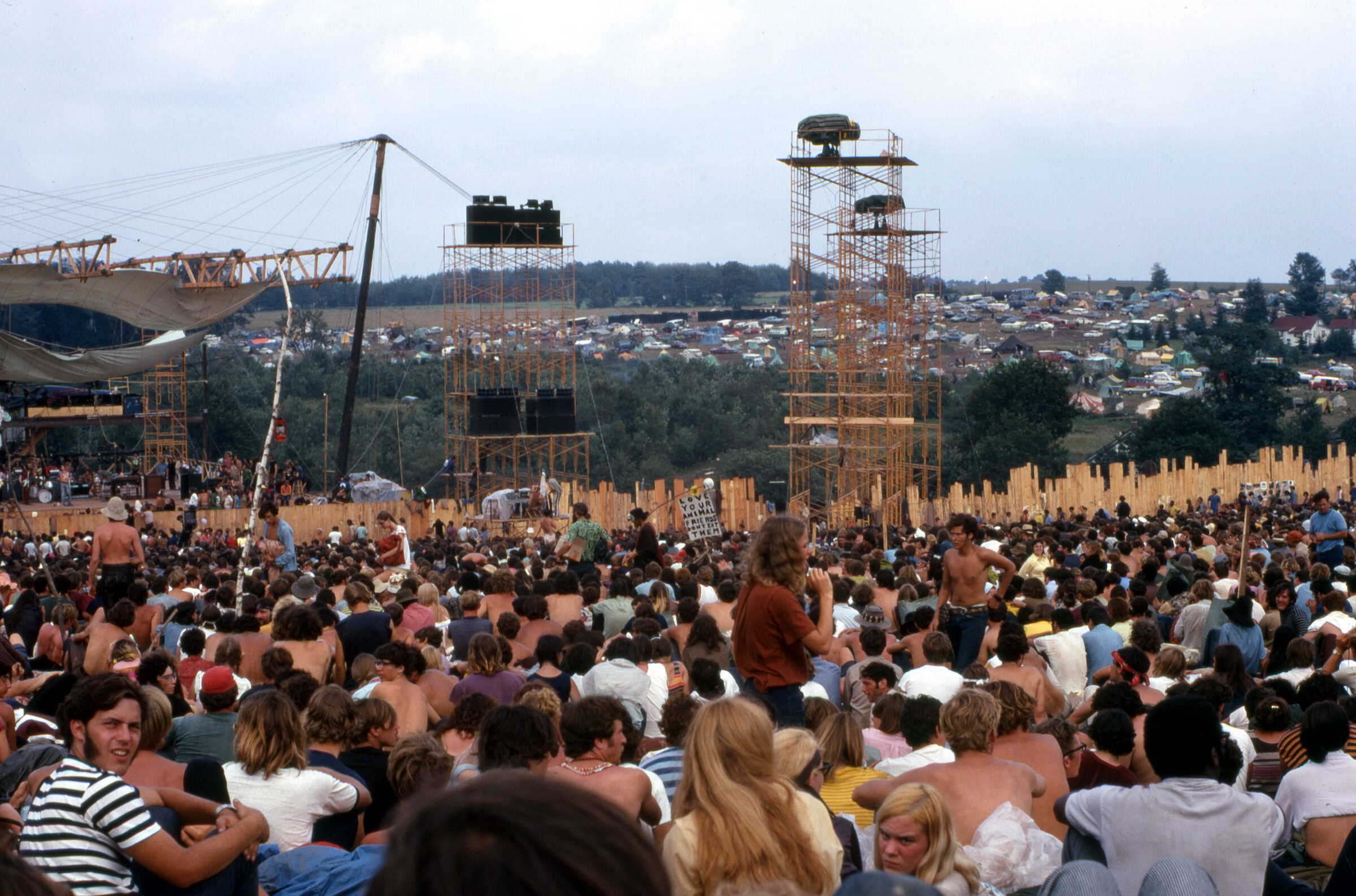
A crowd at Woodstock; visible far center is a sign-on-a-stick totem (displaying "LOVE YOUR ANIMAL FRIENDS DONT EAT THEM") and an object-on-a-stick totem

== Modern usage ==
The first totem use at a music festival is unconfirmed, with some attributing it to Woodstock in 1969. At contemporary music and arts festivals, totems are commonly used by groups of attendees to locate one another in crowded environments. Festivals such as Burning Man, Electric Daisy Carnival, Bonnaroo, Glastonbury, Electric Forest, and Tomorrowland have become known for their vibrant displays of totems and flags, which often feature unique handmade designs, humorous messages, current memes, or references to popular culture or the festival. A festival totem generally utilizes an object rather than a flag so that it can be easily seen fully in any wind conditions, and provide opportunity for 3D creativity. Most commonly referred to as a "totem" by festival attendees, the staffs also may be called "rage sticks" or "doof sticks" depending on the type of festival attended and the country of the festival.

Artists themselves have also encouraged the use of totems at their shows and may post how-to guides or videos for fans to learn how to add to the festival show experience. The popularity and restrictions on festival totems and flags have led to the appearance of custom manufacturers online.

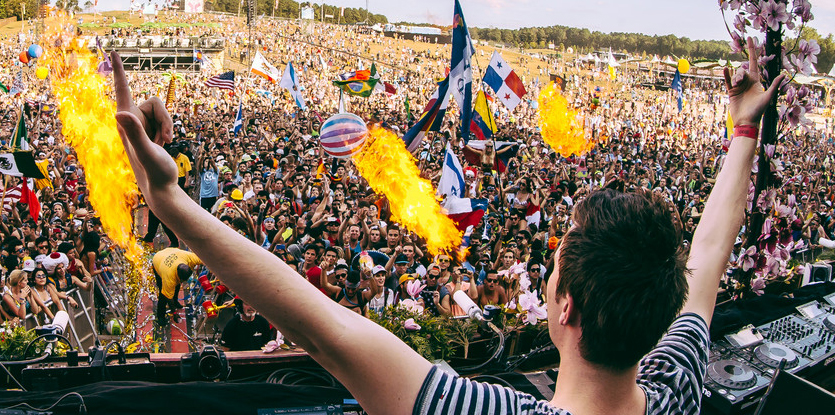
Totems and flags in the crowd at Tomorrowland Festival

Festival totems today may be utilized for a variety of purposes:

- Group Locator: a festival totem's main purpose is generally to make it easy to identify the location of friends in the crowd.
- Camp Locator: a festival totem may be placed at a campsite, like a flagpole might, to identify a camp location in large fields.
- Identity Expression/Statements: a festival totem may make a personal or political statement, as it is hoisted up for thousands to see in person at the festival, on live streams, and in video recorded performances.
- Artist/Crowd Communication: a festival totem may have a message an attendee hopes a performing artist will read, or words meant to attract or solicit conversations from other festival attendees in the crowd.
- Safety and Security: a festival totem may be utilized by safety and security staff at festivals, especially during night, to attempt to locate a person in need or causing a disruption.

== Historical comparisons and nomenclature ==
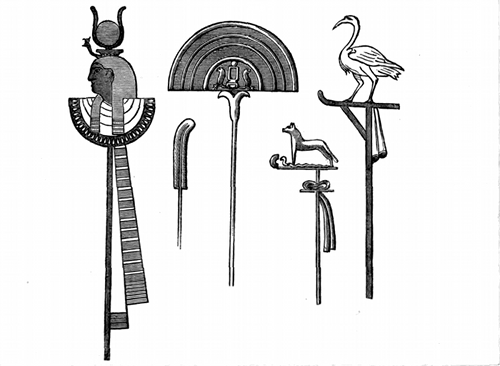
Examples of Egyptian vexilloids

The concept of using "totems" and related staffs to indicate locations was prevalent in ancient armies before festival use. Festival totem carriers today use totems for group identification, which NAVA writers have analogized to vexilloids due to similar practical purposes. Throughout history, armies employed vexilloids as military standards, serving both practical and symbolic purposes; and in warfare, warriors would carry staffs, flags, and banners adorned with distinctive designs to distinguish allies from foes during battle. The first vexilloids were thought to originally be staffs topped by animal parts, like a skull. The staffs served as a designation for leaders of groups, such as military units, and were also used as a visible sign to rally around or point to a direction of attack. A specific example is the Romans using a vexillum, a military standard of the ancient Roman army carried by a vexillarius that attached a square cloth on a staff for similar purposes.

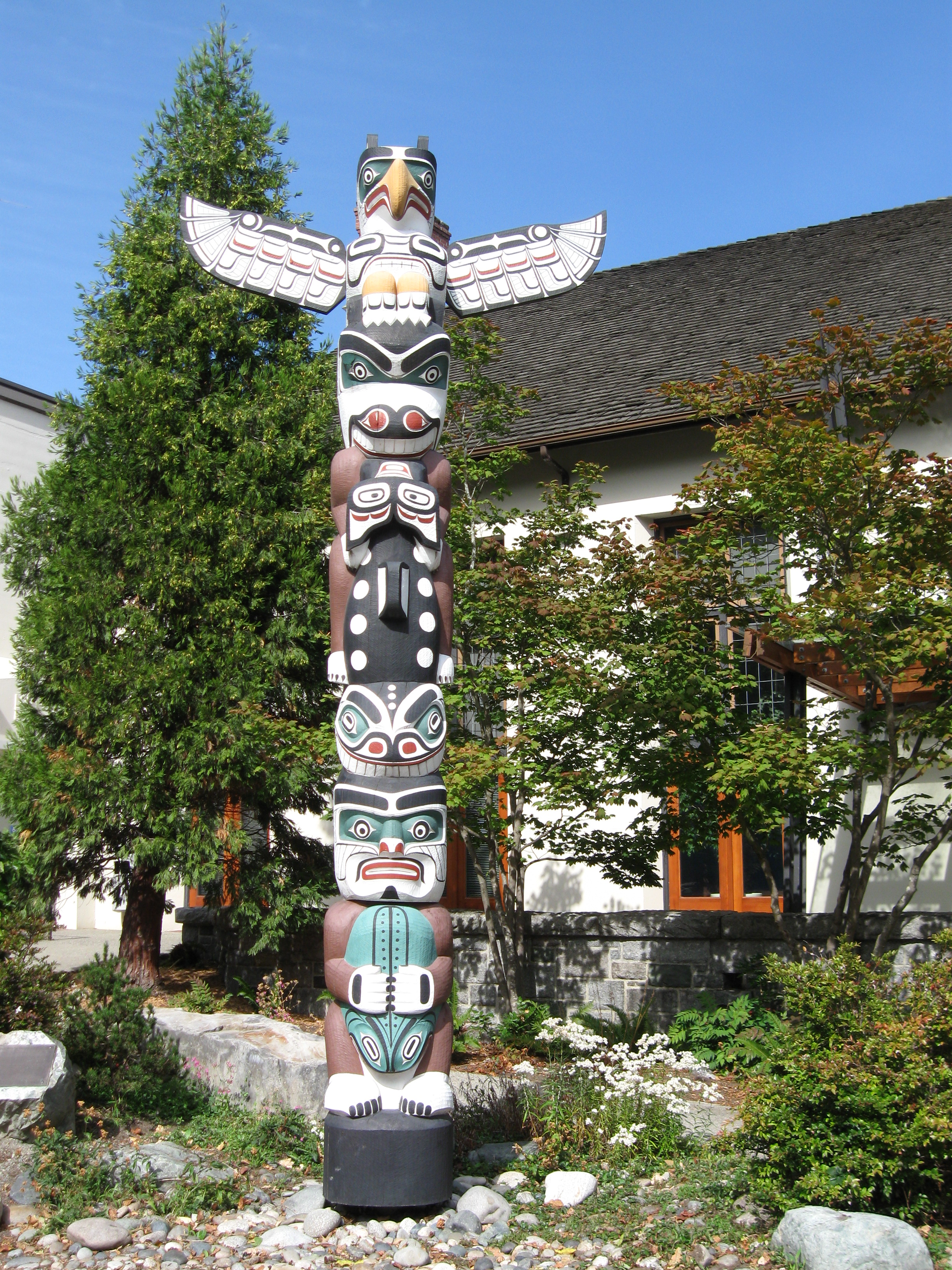
A Native American totem pole

The "totem" name may have come from the comparison to Native American totem poles—festival totems are not as culturally or religiously significant as a totem pole, but similarly display artist creations, recent events, and stand tall to locate certain areas.

== Design and materials ==
Festival totems can be crafted from a variety of materials, including wood, metal, plastic, foam, extendable poles, and fabric. The top of the totem may be a sign, a cutout image, a stuffed animal, or another object. Some festival totems are simple and utilitarian, such as poles attaching premade flags or signs, while others are intricate works of original art featuring LEDs, holographic materials, or kinetic elements that move with the wind or respond to music. Festival totems are usually distinct from flags on poles at festivals as totems generally contain an object and not loose cloth; however, both may be called a "totem" while being utilized in a festival crowd. Festival-goers frequently utilize memes, inside jokes, and other current event references to display on the totem.

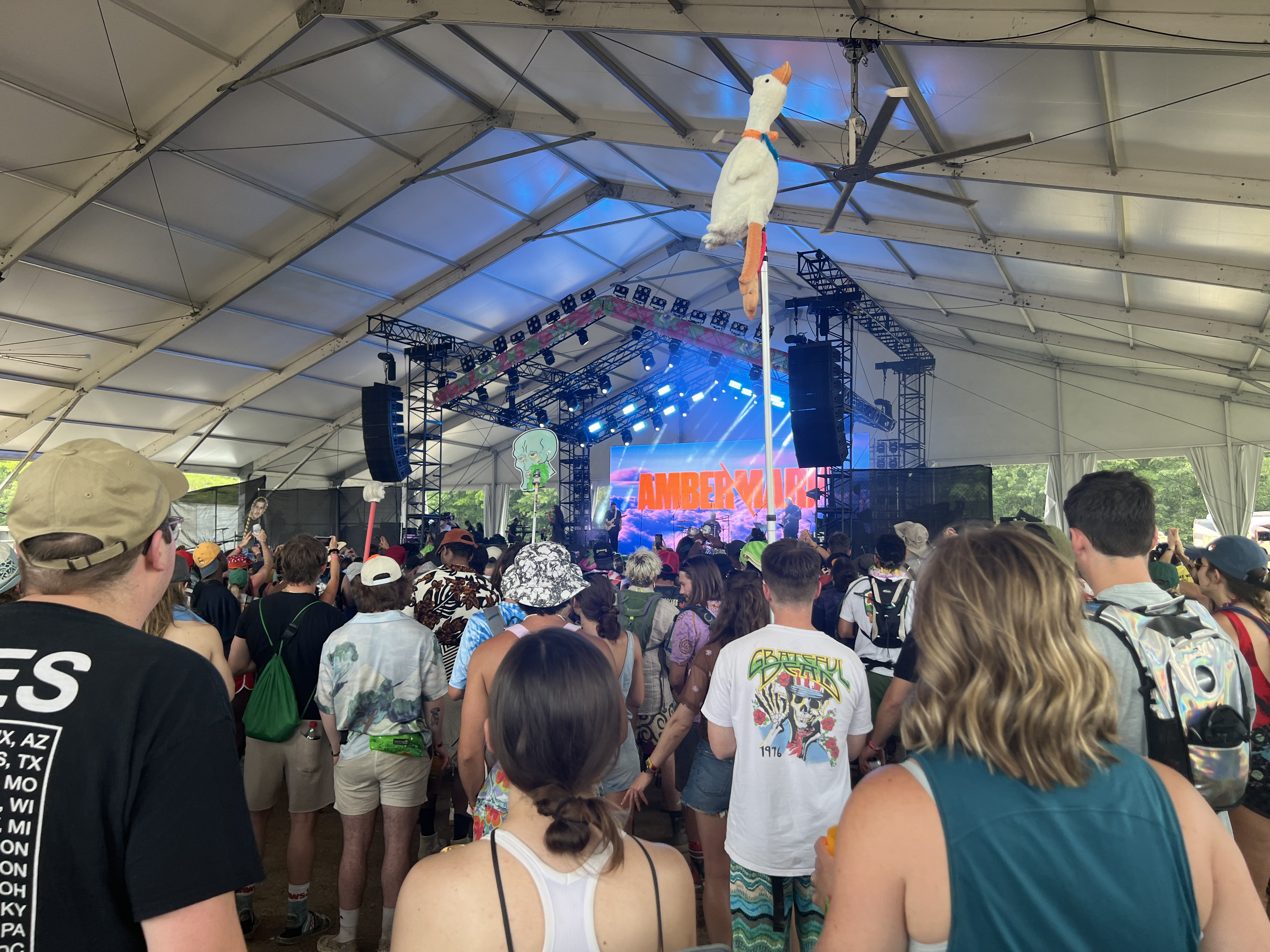
A festival totem constructed of a simple extendable pole and a goose stuffed animal

== Etiquette and regulations ==
Despite their practical benefits, totems have sparked debate within the festival community. With the primary function of festival totems serving as beacons to find groups in large crowds at shows to find friends at a distance, this leads to festival totems blocking the view of stages during shows. Festival attendees have opined that totems should not obstruct the view of others or interfere with the festival experience for fellow attendees and follow the PLUR rave community guidelines. Other attendees and publications note that festival totems supplement the festival experience and add artistic value to the festival while providing a crucial utilitarian purpose of finding friends in disorienting crowds at night.

Some organizers and attendees have raised concerns about safety and the potential for totems to block views of stages or performances. As a result, many festivals have implemented guidelines or restrictions regarding the size, material, height, and usage of totems.
