= L'amore in bocca =

Single by Santi Francesi
- Released: 7 February 2024
- Length: 3:10
- Label: Epic; Sony
- Songwriters: Alessandro De Santis; Mario Lorenzo Francese; Antonio Filippelli; Daniel Bestonzo; Cecilia Del Bono
- Producers: Santi Francesi; Antonio Filippelli; Daniel Bestonzo

Santi Francesi singles chronology
"Occhi tristi" (2023)	"L'amore in bocca" (2024)	"Tutta vera" (2024)

Music video
- "L'amore in bocca" on YouTube

"L'amore in bocca" (transl. "Love in [my] mouth"; a pun on l'amaro in bocca, lit. 'bitter taste in [someone's] mouth', i.e. 'disappointment') is a song by Italian duo Santi Francesi. It was released as a digital download and for streaming on 7 February 2024 by Epic Records and Sony Music.

The song was Santi Francesi's entry for the Sanremo Music Festival 2024, the 74th edition of Italy's musical festival that doubles also as a selection of the act for the Eurovision Song Contest, where it placed 18th in the grand final.

== Music video ==
A music video to accompany the release of "L'amore in bocca", directed by Nicolò Bassetto, was first released onto YouTube on 7 February 2024.

== Charts ==
Chart performance for "L'amore in bocca"
Chart (2024)	Peak position
Italy (FIMI)	24
Italy Airplay (EarOne)	49

== Certifications ==
Region	Certification	Certified units/sales
Italy (FIMI)	Gold	50,000^{‡}
^{‡} Sales+streaming figures based on certification alone.
