= Hell Raton =

Italian rapper and record producer

- Born: Manuel Zappadu; 14 May 1990 (age 35); Olbia, Sardinia, Italy
- Occupations: Rapper; record producer
- Years active: 2010–present
- Label: Machete Empire Records

Manuel Zappadu (born 14 May 1990), known as Hell Raton, is an Italian rapper and record producer. He is best known for his project Machete Empire Records and his crew Machete Crew, founded in 2010 with Salmo, Slait and En?gma (the latter having exited it in 2016); as well as for being one of the four judges in the fourteenth season of X Factor Italia, which was won by Casadilego who formed part of his category (Girls). He returned for the X Factor (Italian season 15) and won again with Baltimora.

== Biography ==
In 2020 he was engaged in some charitable projects such as Machete Aid on Twitch.tv for those working in the music industry and facing the crisis caused by the COVID-19 pandemic. On 9 June 2020 his participation as judge in the fourteenth edition of X Factor was announced, captaining the Girls category (which included Mydrama, Casadilego and Cmqmartina) and winning the edition with Casadilego. In 2021, he won X Factor again with his pupil Baltimora.

== Judicial proceedings ==
In 2020 the newspaper La Nuova Sardegna reported that Zappadu was accused of the crime of complicity in aggravated personal injury, along with 11 other people. According to the accusation, the rapper was part of a group of 12 boys who in 2015 beat 3 young people in front of a nightclub in Ortacesus.

== Discography ==
=== Mixtapes ===
- 2011 – Basura Muzik Vol. 1 (published as El Raton)

=== EP ===
- 2014 – Rattopsy EP (published as El Raton)

=== Singles ===
As El Raton

- 2011 – Multicultural
- 2013 – The Island (Salmo feat. El Raton & Enigma)
- 2014 – Paper Street (feat. DJ Slait)
- 2014 – Jerry il Sorcio

As Hell Raton

- 2017 – Buganda Rock
- 2017 – Hell Taxi

=== Collaborations ===
- 2012 – Machete Crew – Machete Mixtape
- 2012 – DJ Slait – Bloody Vinyl
- 2012 – Machete Crew – Machete Mixtape Vol II
- 2014 – Machete Crew – Machete Mixtape III
- 2015 – DJ Slait – Bloody Vinyl 2
- 2019 – Machete Crew – Machete Mixtape 4
- 2020 – DJ Slait, Low Kidd, Tha Supreme e Young Miles – Bloody Vinyl 3
