= El Ma =

Bulgarian singer-songwriter (born 2007)

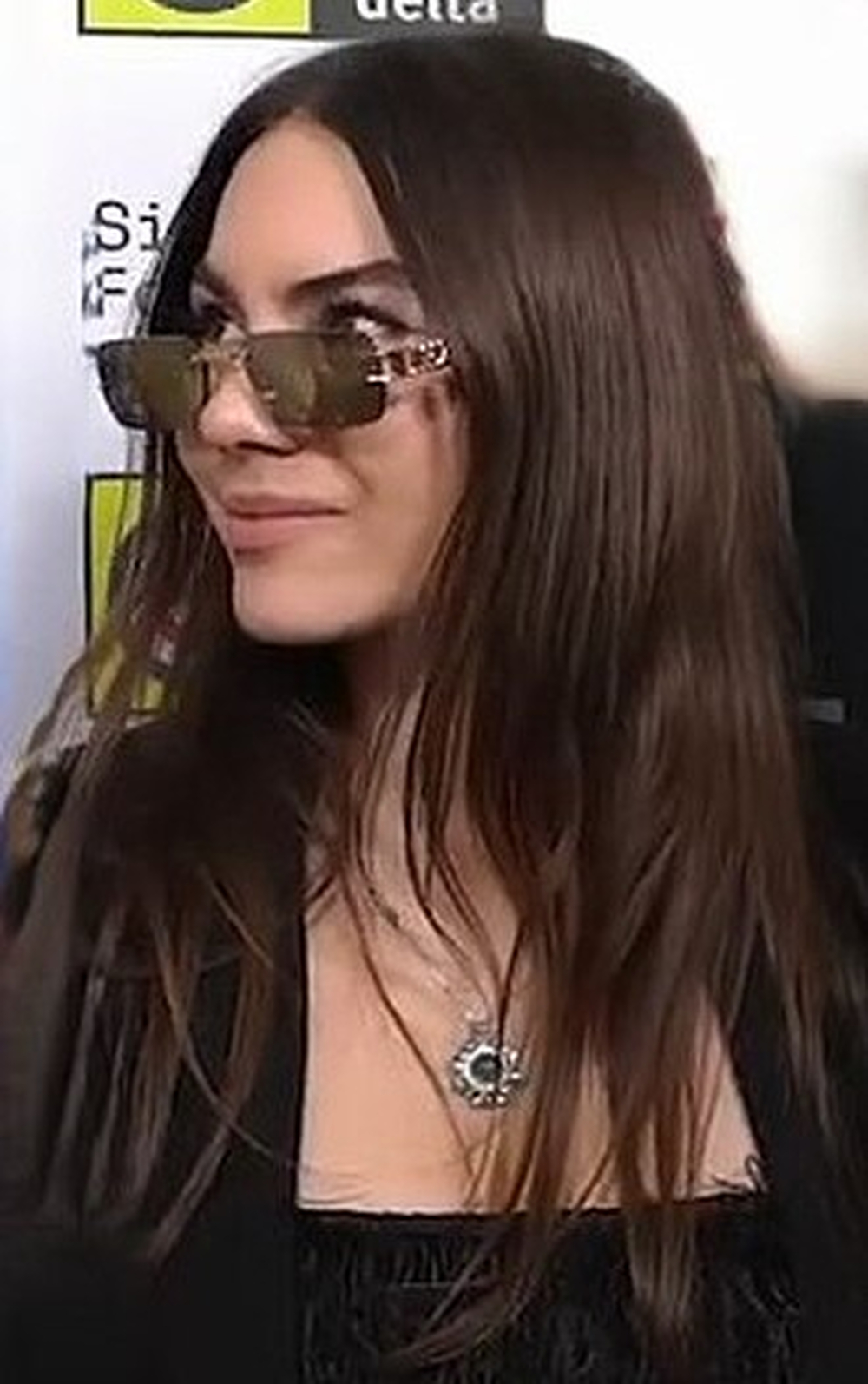
- El Ma in February 2026

Background information
- Born: Elmira Marinova; 21 May 2007 (age 18); Sofia, Bulgaria
- Genres: Pop
- Occupations: Singer; songwriter
- Instrument: Vocals
- Years active: 2023–present
- Labels: Kontradikt; ADA; Warner Music Italy

Elmira Marinova (Bulgarian: Елмира Маринова, born 21 May 2007), known professionally as El Ma (Bulgarian: Ел Ма), is a Bulgarian singer-songwriter based in Italy.

== Early life and education ==
Born in 2007 in Sofia, the capital of Bulgaria, she is the daughter of a former Bulgarian national youth soccer player and a former model committed to supporting charitable foundations. Her brother is a drum and bass musician.

At the age of nine, she began taking singing lessons, joining a children's choir taught by Adelina Koleva. At fourteen, she moved to Italy to pursue her musical career, and at fifteen, she released her first original song, recorded at Dariana Koumanova's Studio20 Milano.

== Career ==
In 2023 she collaborated with MD DJ releasing the songs "Tired of Loving You (MD DJ Remix)" , "Stop This Flame" and "Say My Name". In the same year she won the title of European Champion in the singing category, during the European Championship of Performing Arts, held in Rome.

In 2024 she released the songs "Going Down", "Domino" and "Blow Your Mind", the latter two featuring MD DJ. In the same year she decided to sign up for the casting of the eighteenth edition of the talent show X Factor, hosted by Giorgia, where she took part in Jake La Furia's team. She was then eliminated during the third episode on 26 September. In 2025 with MD DJ she released the singles "Blow Your Mind", "Beautiful Life", "Dilema" and "Sky" and the solo singles "Give it to me", "Beats again" and "Julie".

El Ma joined a trio with Blind and Soniko, and together they were among the ten winning acts of the Area Sanremo contest on 12 December 2025. The trio was selected to compete in the Newcomers' section of the Sanremo Music Festival 2026. Their entry, titled "Nei miei DM", was eliminated in the semi-final. On 13 February 2026, the single "Dicitencello vuje" was released. On 24 April the single "Mille sguardi" together with Garelli was released.

== Discography ==
=== Singles ===
List of singles, with chart positions and album name
Title	Year	Peak chart positions	Album or EP
Title	Year	ITA	Album or EP
"Tired of Loving You (MD DJ Remix)" (with MD DJ)	2023	—	Non-album singles
"Stop This Flame" (with MD DJ)	2023	—	Non-album singles
"Say My Name" (with MD DJ)	2023	—	Non-album singles
"Going Down"	2024	—	Non-album singles
"Domino" (with MD DJ)	2024	—	Non-album singles
"Blow Your Mind" (with MD DJ)	2024	—	Non-album singles
"Beautiful Life" (with MD DJ)	2025	—	Non-album singles
"Give it to me"	2025	—	Non-album singles
"Beats again"	2025	—	Non-album singles
"Dilema" (with MD DJ)	2025	—	Non-album singles
"Sky" (with MD DJ)	2025	—	Non-album singles
"Julie"	2025	—	Non-album singles
"Nei miei DM" (with Blind and Soniko)	2025	67	Non-album singles
"Dicitencello vuje"	2026	—	Non-album singles
"Mille sguardi" (with Garelli)	2026	—	Non-album singles
"—" denotes singles that did not chart or were not released.

== Television programs ==
Year	Title	Network	Notes
2024	X Factor	Sky Uno	Contestant (season 18)
