= Baltimora (singer) =

Italian singer

- Born: Edoardo Spinsante; 20 May 2001 (age 25); Ancona, Marche, Italy
- Genre: Pop
- Occupations: Singer; songwriter; producer
- Years active: 2021–present
- Label: Sony Music (2021–2022)

Edoardo Spinsante (born 20 May 2001), known professionally as Baltimora, is an Italian singer-songwriter and record producer, most known for winning the fifteenth season of the Italian talent show X Factor.

== Early life ==
Edoardo Spinsante was born in 2001 and grew up in Ancona, where he attended the liceo scientifico.

In 2020, he started producing his own music under the pen name Plugsaints, with his band which include his friends Elsic, Gabbo and Jmane.

== Career ==
=== 2021–2024: X Factor Italia and career debut ===
In September 2021, Spinsante debuted as a singer with "Luci spente" and changed his name to Baltimora. He participated as a contestant at the fifteenth edition of the Italian version of X Factor, and was mentored by coach Hell Raton. On 9 December 2021, he won the competition with his single "Altro". During the fifth live show on 25 November 2021, he also performed his second single entitled "Baltimora".

On 28 January 2022, he released his first single after X Factor, entitled "Colore". His debut extended play Marecittà was released on 11 March 2022.

To further his musical career, Baltimora moved to Milan, where he became involved in the city's music scene.

=== 2025–present: In tasca ===
In 2025, Baltimora returned to Ancona, explaining that Milan "wasn't helping me develop my identity, so I came back to rediscover myself". On 5 September 2025, he performed at the Festa del Mare.

On 29 May 2026, he released his debut studio album, In tasca, featuring ten tracks, including a duet with Emma Nolde.

== Discography ==
=== Studio albums ===
- In tasca (2026)

=== EPs ===
- Marecittà (2022)

=== Singles ===
- "Luci spente" (2021)
- "Altro" (2021)
- "Baltimora" (2021)
- "Colore" (2022)
- "Marecittà" (2022)
- "Dove andare" (2026)
- "Maltempo" (2026)

Awards and achievements
Preceded by Casadilego	Italian X Factor; Winner; 2021	Succeeded by Santi Francesi
