= My Soul Summer =

2022 Italian musical comedy film

- Directed by: Fabio Mollo
- Screenplay by: Doriana Leondeff; Antonio Leotti
- Story by: Regina Boemi
- Starring: Casadilego; Tommaso Ragno; Luka Zunic; Agnese Claisse; Anna Ferzetti; Lunetta Savino
- Cinematography: Daniele Ciprì
- Edited by: Filippo Montemurro
- Music by: Valerio C. Faggioni; Casadilego
- Production companies: Bartleby Film; Fidelio; Rai Cinema
- Release dates: 16 October 2022 (Rome); 24 October 2022 (Italy)
- Running time: 115 minutes
- Country: Italy
- Language: Italian

My Soul Summer is a 2022 Italian musical coming-of-age film directed by Fabio Mollo, and starring Casadilego, Tommaso Ragno, Luka Zunic, Agnese Claisse, Anna Ferzetti, and Lunetta Savino.

The film premiered on 16 October 2022 at Alice nella città, an independent parallel section of the Rome Film Festival. It was released in Italian cinemas on 24 October 2022.

== Plot ==
Anita is a 17-year-old girl who feels comfortable only when playing the piano. To prepare for her conservatory entrance examinations, her parents send her to her grandmother's seaside home in Calabria. During the summer, she reconnects with a lively childhood friend, Vittore, and meets famous singer Vins, who helps her discovering her own musical talent.

== Cast ==
- Casadilego as Anita Fanelli
- Tommaso Ragno as Vins
- Luka Zunic as Vittore
- Agnese Claisse as Sara
- Anna Ferzetti as Ludovica
- Lunetta Savino as Daria
- Martina Maria Monti as Sofia
- Matteo Lanfranchi as Umberto
- Matteo Oscar Giuggioli as Lip
- Timothy Martin as Wally
- Chiara Tomarelli as Isabella
- Mario Berna as Stefano
