= Soniko =

Italian singer-songwriter, rapper, record producer and disc jockey (born 2001)

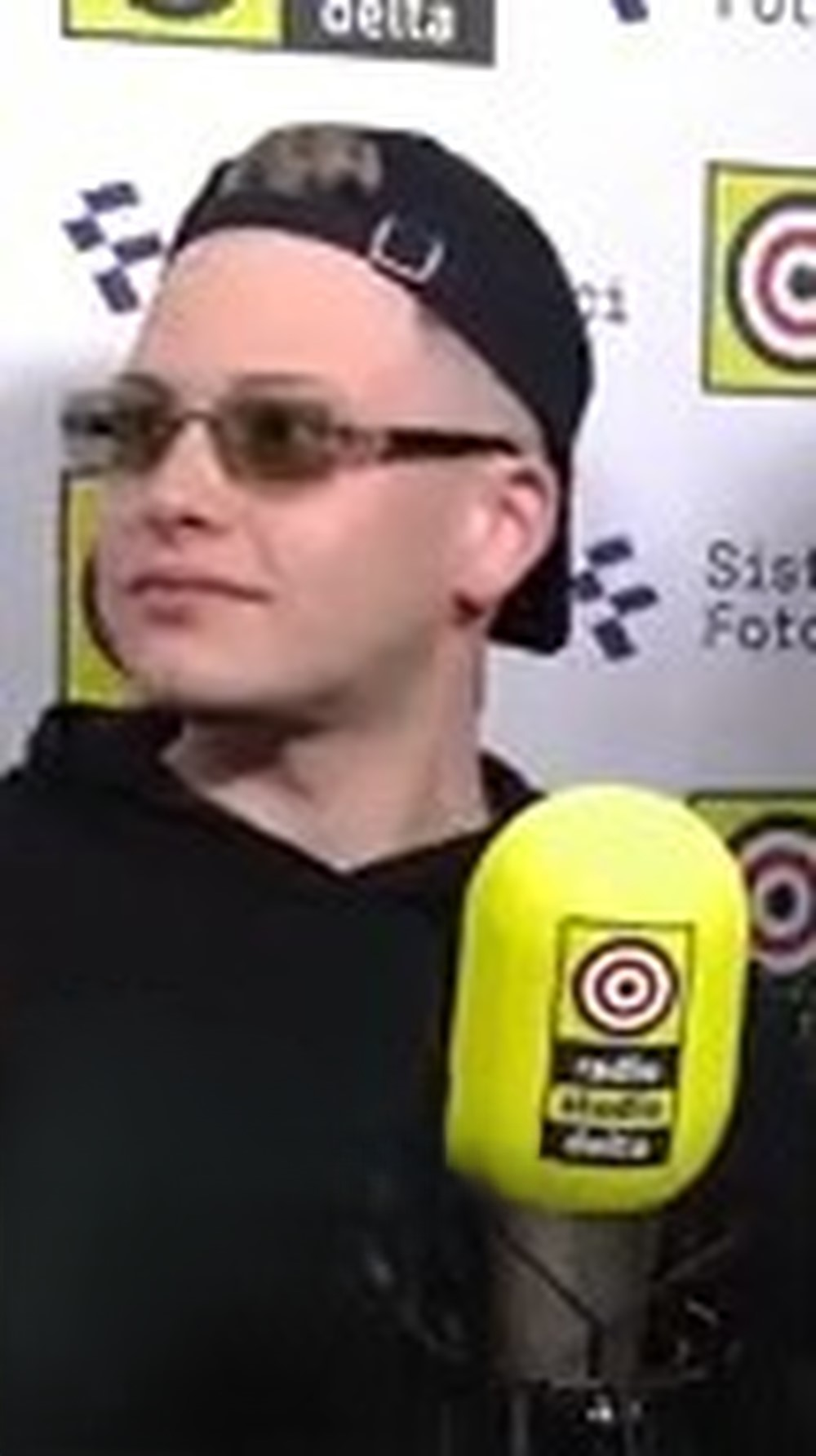
- Soniko in February 2026

Background information
- Born: Niccolò Cervellin; 7 August 2001 (age 24); Cittadella, Veneto, Italy
- Genres: Pop rap; rock
- Occupations: Singer; songwriter; rapper; record producer; disc jockey
- Instruments: Vocals; console
- Years active: 2017–present
- Labels: Hokuto Empire; Sony Music; Digitalvip

Niccolò Cervellin (born 7 August 2001), known professionally as Soniko, is an Italian singer-songwriter, rapper, record producer and disc jockey.

== Early life and education ==
Born in 2001 in Cittadella (PD) and raised in Castelfranco Veneto (TV), he is the son of the entrepreneur Sergio Cervellin. Passionate about music since he was a child, Soniko has drawn inspiration from various musical genres (pop, trap, dance and rock) and has cited several artists, including Queen, Gianluca Grignani, Nek and 883.

== Career ==
In 2018, she began her musical career by releasing her first single, "Kissa", on 29 June. On 23 November she released the single "Amare l'amore", with which she won the Lunezia Award for Teen Artist of the Year the following year. The single "Rum e reggaeton" was released on 15 May 2019, followed by the single "Alice" on 14 February 2020.

On 29 May 2020 the single "Odio tutti" by Nuela was released, on which she collaborated. The single "Baila caliente (ti chiamo summer perché...)" was released on 10 July, followed on 9 September by the single "Quimica" featuring El Guillo. The single "Chanel" was released on 19 March 2021. On 29 April 2022 he released the single "Lividi", followed by the single "Faremo notte" on 19 September.

On 4 July 2025 he released the single "Sweet Talking". In the same year Soniko joined a trio with Blind and El Ma, and together they were among the ten winning acts of the Area Sanremo contest on 12 December. The trio was selected to compete in the Newcomers' section of the Sanremo Music Festival 2026. Their entry, titled "Nei miei DM", was eliminated in the semi-final.

== Discography ==
=== Singles ===
==== As lead artist ====
List of singles, with chart positions and album name
Single	Year	Peak chart positions	Album or EP
Single	Year	ITA	Album or EP
"Kissa"	2018	—	Non-album singles
"Amare l'amore"	2018	—	Non-album singles
"Rum e reggaeton"	2019	—	Non-album singles
"Alice"	2019	—	Non-album singles
"Baila caliente (ti chiamo summer perché...)"	2020	—	Non-album singles
"Quimica" (with El Guillo)	2020	—	Non-album singles
"Chanel"	2021	—	Non-album singles
"Lividi"	2022	—	Non-album singles
"Faremo notte"	2022	—	Non-album singles
"Sweet Talking"	2025	—	Non-album singles
"Nei miei DM" (with Blind and El Ma)	2025	67	Non-album singles
"—" denotes singles that did not chart or were not released.

==== As featured artist ====
List of singles
Title	Year
"Odio tutti" (Nuela featuring Soniko)	2020

== Awards and nominations ==
Year	Award	Nomination	Work	Result	Notes
2019	Lunezia Award	Teen Artist of the Year	"Amare l'amore"	Won	
