= Santi Francesi =

Italian musical duo

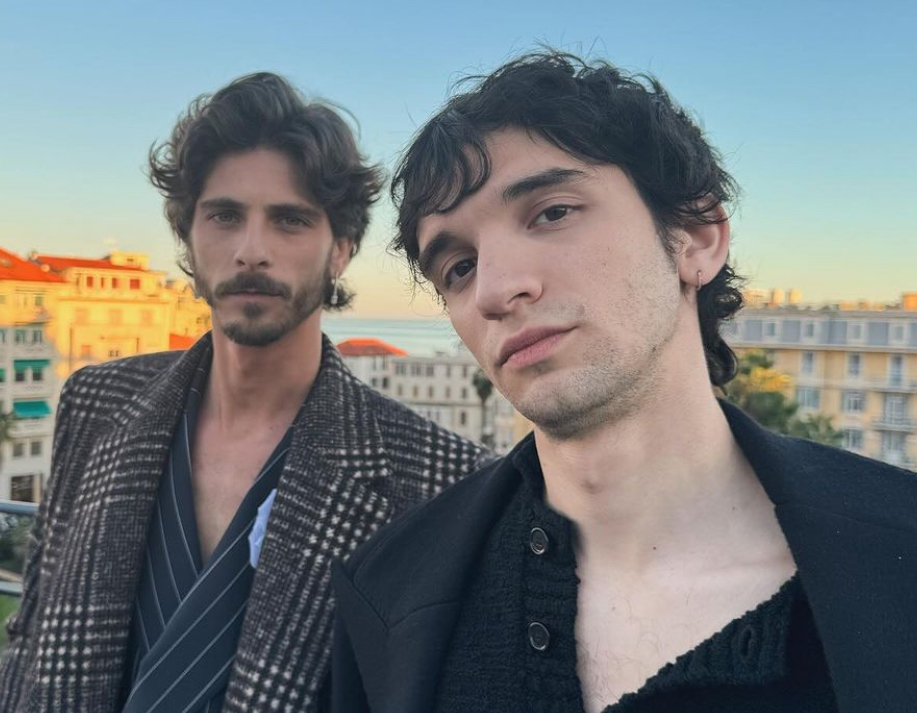
- De Santis (left) and Francese (right)

Background information
- Also known as: The Jab
- Origin: Ivrea, Piedmont, Italy
- Genres: Pop
- Years active: 2015–present
- Members: Alessandro De Santis; Mario Lorenzo Francese
- Past members: Davide Vuono

Santi Francesi (Italian for 'French Saints', a pun on the members' last names), previously known as The Jab, is an Italian musical duo from Ivrea, consisting of Alessandro De Santis and Mario Lorenzo Francese. They won the sixteenth season of X Factor Italia.

== History ==
Founded as The Jab, they won Luciano Ligabue's Liga Rock Park Contest with their first single "Regina", which allowed them to open his event Liga Rock Park in September 2016.

In 2017 they participated at the 17th season of the Italian talent show Amici di Maria De Filippi. After this experience, they released the three songs "Costenzo", "Vaniglia" and "Lei". In 2019 they released the studio album Tutti manifesti and various singles between 2018 and 2021.

Early in 2021, Santi Francesi took part the Spaghetti Unplugged festival. In June 2021, they won the 32nd edition of the festival Musicultura, which takes place in Recanati and was broadcast on Rai 1, with the song "Giovani favolosi", co-authored with Dade (Salmo, Linea 77, Marracash and Margherita Vicario). The song was released as a single and was included in the soundtrack of the third season of the Netflix series Summertime the following year.

In early 2022 the single "Signorino" (feat. Rodrigo D'Erasmo, produced by Dade) was released, followed by "Buttami giù" (co-produced by Heysimo) in May 2022. In the summer they performed at the Ferrara Summer Festival, before Madame and Blanco.

In late 2022, they participated as contestants at the sixteenth edition of X Factor Italia, and were mentored by coach Rkomi. On 8 December 2022, they won the competition with their single "Non è così male". On 12 December 2022, the band released the extended play In fieri, which included their winning single, two cover songs performed during the show and three original songs; the album was supported by a club tour across the cities of Turin, Bologna, Milan, Rome, Naples and Florence.

On 16 June 2023, Santi Francesi released the single "La noia", followed by a summer tour which included a date at the Sziget Festival in Budapest. On 19 December 2023, they competed in the final of Sanremo Giovani 2023 with the song "Occhi tristi". They were among the three artists selected to take part in the Sanremo Music Festival 2024, with the song "L'amore in bocca".

== Personnel ==
- Alessandro De Santis – vocals, guitar, ukulele
- Mario Lorenzo Francese – keyboard, synthesizer, bass guitar

== Discography ==
=== Studio albums ===
As The Jab

- Tutti manifesti (2019)

=== EPs ===
- In fieri (2022)
- Potrebbe non avere peso (2024)

=== Singles ===
As The Jab

- "Regina" (2016)
- "Polvere" (2016)
- "Elena" (2018)
- "Costenzo" (2018)
- "Vaniglia" (2018)
- "Lei" (2019)
- "Bianca" (2019)
- "Giovani favolosi" (2021)

As Santi Francesi

- "Signorino" (2022)
- "Buttami giù" (2022)
- "Non è così male" (2022)
- "La noia" (2023)
- "Occhi tristi" (2023)
- "L'amore in bocca" (2024)
- "Tutta vera" (2024)
- "Ho paura di tutto" (2024)

Awards and achievements
Preceded by Baltimora	Italian X Factor; Winner; 2022	Succeeded by Sarafine
