= X Factor (Italian TV series) season 13 =

X Factor
- Season 13
- Hosted by: Alessandro Cattelan
- Judges: Samuel; Malika Ayane; Mara Maionchi; Sfera Ebbasta
- Winner: Sofia Tornambene
- Winning mentor: Sfera Ebbasta
- Runner-up: Booda

Release
- Original network: Sky Uno; TV8
- Original release: 27 February – 1 May 2017

Season chronology
- ← Previous; Season 12 Next → Season 14

X Factor is an Italian television music competition to find new singing talent; the winner receives a recording contract with Sony Music., Mara Maionchi is the only judge who will return from last season, while Samuel, Malika Ayane and Sfera Ebbasta and is the new entry; also Alessandro Cattelan was confirmed as host. The thirteenth season was aired on Sky Uno and TV8 since September 2019. Sofia Tornambene won the competition and Sfera Ebbasta became the winning coach for the first time.

== Judges' houses ==
The "Home Visit" is the final phase before the Live Shows. In this phase, the contestants who passed the "Bootcamp" had to perform one last time in front of their specific judge, in four different locations. At the end of this audition, the top twelve contestants were chosen.

The eight eliminated acts were:

- Boys: Daniel Acerboni, Emanuele Crisanti (Nuela)
- Girls: Silvia "Sissi" Cesana, Beatrice Giliberti
- 25+: Tomas Tai, Gabriele Troisi
- Groups: K_Mono, Kyber

== Contestants and categories ==
Key:

– Winner
– Runner-up
– Third place

Category (mentor)	Acts		
Boys (Ayane)	Enrico Di Lauro (Harry Dila)	Lorenzo Rinaldi	Davide Rossi
Girls (Ebbasta)	Giordana Petralia	Mariam Rouass (Maryam)	Sofia Tornambene (Kimono)
25+ (Maionchi)	Eugenio Campagna (Comete)	Nicola Cavallaro	Marco Saltari (Jordy Brown)
Groups (Samuel)	Booda	Seawards	Sierra

== Live shows ==
=== Results summary ===
The number of votes received by each act will be released by Sky Italia after the final.

Colour key

–	Contestant was in the bottom two/three and had to sing again in the final showdown
–	Contestant was in the bottom three but was saved
–	Contestant was in the bottom three but received the fewest votes and was immediately eliminated
–	Contestant received the fewest public votes and was immediately eliminated (no final showdown)
–	Contestant received the most public votes

Weekly results per contestant
Contestant	Week 1			Week 2		Week 3		Week 4		Week 5	Quarter-Final			Semi-Final		Final		
Contestant	Part 1	Part 2	Part 3	Part 1	Part 2	Round 1	Round 2	Part 1	Part 2	Week 5	Round 1	Round 2	Round 3	Round 1	Round 2	Round 1	Round 2	Round 3
Sofia Tornambene	—N/a	—N/a	1st	—N/a	1st	1st	1st	—N/a	2nd	1st	1st	1st	—N/a	1st	1st	1st	1st	Winner; 60.21%
Booda	—N/a	1st	—N/a	1st	—N/a	3rd	3rd	—N/a	3rd	4th	3rd	4th	1st	2nd	4th	2nd	2nd	Runner-up; 39.79%
Sierra	—N/a	—N/a	3rd	3rd	—N/a	4th	4th	3rd	—N/a	3rd	2nd	3rd	—N/a	4th	3rd	3rd	3rd	Eliminated (final)
Davide Rossi	2nd	—N/a	—N/a	—N/a	4th	6th	6th	1st	—N/a	5th	5th	5th	2nd	3rd	2nd	4th	Eliminated (final)	
Eugenio Campagna	1st	—N/a	—N/a	—N/a	2nd	2nd	2nd	—N/a	1st	2nd	4th	2nd	—N/a	5th	—N/a	Eliminated (semi-final)		
Nicola Cavallaro	—N/a	2nd	—N/a	2nd	—N/a	8th	7th	2nd	—N/a	6th	6th	6th	3rd	Eliminated (quarter-final)				
Giordana Petralia	—N/a	4th	—N/a	4th	—N/a	9th	9th	4th	—N/a	7th	—N/a	Eliminated (quarter-final)						
Seawards	3rd	—N/a	—N/a	—N/a	3rd	5th	5th	—N/a	4th	Eliminated (Week 4)								
Lorenzo Rinaldi	—N/a	3rd	—N/a	5th	—N/a	7th	8th	Eliminated (Week 3)										
Marco Saltari	—N/a	—N/a	2nd	—N/a	5th	10th	Eliminated (Week 3)											
Enrico Di Lauro	—N/a	—N/a	4th	6th	—N/a	Eliminated (Week 2)												
Mariam Rouass	4th	—N/a	—N/a	Eliminated (Week 1)														
Final Showdown	Mariam Rouass; Enrico Di Lauro			Enrico Di Lauro; Marco Saltari		Lorenzo Rinaldi; Giordana Petralia		Giordana Petralia; Seawards		Giordana Petralia; Davide Rossi		Davide Rossi; Nicola Cavallaro		Eugenio Campagna; Booda		No final showdown or judges' vote: results will be based on public votes alone		
Judges' vote to eliminate																No final showdown or judges' vote: results will be based on public votes alone		
Samuel's vote	Mariam Rouass			Enrico Di Lauro		Lorenzo Rinaldi		Giordana Petralia		Giordana Petralia		Nicola Cavallaro		Eugenio Campagna		No final showdown or judges' vote: results will be based on public votes alone		
Maionchi's vote	Enrico Di Lauro			Enrico Di Lauro		Lorenzo Rinaldi		Seawards		Giordana Petralia		Davide Rossi		Booda		No final showdown or judges' vote: results will be based on public votes alone		
Ebbasta's vote	Enrico Di Lauro			Enrico Di Lauro		Lorenzo Rinaldi		Seawards		Davide Rossi		Nicola Cavallaro		Eugenio Campagna		No final showdown or judges' vote: results will be based on public votes alone		
Ayane's vote	Mariam Rouass			Marco Saltari		Giordana Petralia		Seawards		Giordana Petralia		Nicola Cavallaro		Eugenio Campagna		No final showdown or judges' vote: results will be based on public votes alone		
Eliminated	Mariam Rouass; Public vote to save			Enrico Di Lauro; 3 of 4 votes majority		Marco Saltari; Public vote to save		Seawards; 3 of 4 votes majority		Giordana Petralia; 3 of 4 votes majority		Nicola Cavallaro; 3 of 4 votes majority		Eugenio Campagna; 3 of 4 votes majority		Davide Rossi; Public vote to win	Sierra; Public vote to win	Booda; Public vote to win
Eliminated	Mariam Rouass; Public vote to save			Enrico Di Lauro; 3 of 4 votes majority		Lorenzo Rinaldi; 3 of 4 votes majority		Seawards; 3 of 4 votes majority		Giordana Petralia; 3 of 4 votes majority		Nicola Cavallaro; 3 of 4 votes majority		Eugenio Campagna; 3 of 4 votes majority		Davide Rossi; Public vote to win	Sierra; Public vote to win	Booda; Public vote to win

=== Live show details ===
==== Week 1 (24 October) ====
Contestants' performances on the first live show
Part 1
Act	Order	Song	Result
Mariam Rouass	1	"Juice"	Bottom three
Seawards	2	"Pyro"	Safe
Eugenio Campagna	3	"Arsenico"	Safe
Davide Rossi	4	"How Long Has This Been Going On?"	Safe
Part 2
Act	Order	Song	Result
Nicola Cavallaro	5	"This Is America"	Safe
Lorenzo Rinaldi	6	"Don't Look Back in Anger"	Safe
Booda	7	"212"	Safe
Giordana Petralia	8	"Jocelyn Flores"	Bottom three
Part 3
Act	Order	Song	Result
Sofia Tornambene	9	"L'ultimo bacio"	Safe
Enrico Di Lauro	10	"Love Will Tear Us Apart"	Bottom three
Sierra	11	"Dark Horse"	Safe
Marco Saltari	12	"Sugarman"	Safe
Act	Order	Song	Result
Final showdown details
Act	Order	Song	Result
Mariam Rouass	13	"Gioventù bruciata"	Eliminated
Giordana Petralia	14	"Strange World"	Saved
Enrico Di Lauro	15	"Make You Feel My Love"	Safe

Judges' votes to eliminate

- Ebbasta: Enrico Di Lauro - backed his own act, Mariam Rouass.
- Ayane: Mariam Rouass - backed her own act, Enrico Di Lauro.
- Samuel: Mariam Rouass - gave no reason.
- Maionchi: Enrico Di Lauro - gave no reason.

With the acts in the sing-off receiving two votes each, the result was deadlocked and a new public vote commenced for 200 seconds. Mariam Rouass was eliminated as the act with the fewest public votes.

==== Week 2 (31 October) ====
Contestants' performances on the second live show
Part 1
Act	Order	Song	Result
Booda	1	"Take Ü There"	Safe
Giordana Petralia	2	"Summertime Sadness"	Safe
Enrico Di Lauro	3	"Cieli immensi"	Bottom two
Nicola Cavallaro	4	"Old Town Road"	Safe
Sierra	5	"7 Rings"	Safe
Lorenzo Rinaldi	6	"La notte"	Safe
Part 2
Act	Order	Song	Result
Sofia Tornambene	7	"Fix You"	Safe
Marco Saltari	8	"My Sweet Lord"	Bottom two
Seawards	9	"Clocks Go Forwards"	Safe
Davide Rossi	10	"In alto mare"	Safe
Eugenio Campagna	11	"Scomparire"	Safe
Act	Order	Song	Result
Final showdown details
Act	Order	Song	Result
Enrico Di Lauro	12	"Yesterday"	Eliminated
Marco Saltari	13	"Breaking the Girl"	Safe

Judge's vote to eliminate

- Ebbasta: Enrico Di Lauro - gave no reason.
- Ayane: Marco Saltari - backed her own act, Enrico Di Lauro.
- Samuel: Enrico Di Lauro - gave no reason.
- Maionchi: Enrico Di Lauro - backed her own act, Marco Saltari.

==== Week 3 (7 November) ====
Contestants' performances on the third live show
Round 1
Act	Order	Song	Result
Lorenzo Rinaldi	1	"Let Her Go"	Safe
Sierra	2	"Enfasi" (original song)	Safe
Giordana Petralia	3	"Wicked Game"	Safe
Eugenio Campagna	4	"En e Xanax"	Safe
Booda	5	"Hey Mama"	Safe
Nicola Cavallaro	6	"Love Is a Losing Game"	Safe
Seawards	7	"Dream On"	Safe
Sofia Tornambene	8	"A domani per sempre" (original song)	Safe
Marco Saltari	9	"Get Up, Stand Up"	Eliminated
Davide Rossi	10	"Lately"	Safe
Round 2
Act	Order	Song	Result
Booda	1	"All or Nothing"	Safe
Nicola Cavallaro	2	"Happy"	Safe
Sofia Tornambene	3	"C'est la vie"	Safe
Lorenzo Rinaldi	4	"Baby, I Love You"	Eliminated
Sierra	5	"Le acciughe fanno il pallone"	Safe
Giordana Petralia	6	"Bellyache"	Bottom two
Eugenio Campagna	7	"Cornflakes" (original song)	Safe
Davide Rossi	8	"Why'd You Only Call Me When You're High?"	Safe
Seawards	9	"Vedrai, vedrai"	Safe

Judge's vote to eliminate

- Ebbasta: Lorenzo Rinaldi - backed his own act, Giordana Petralia.
- Ayane: Giordana Petralia - backed her own act, Lorenzo Rinaldi.
- Samuel: Lorenzo Rinaldi - gave no reason.
- Maionchi: Lorenzo Rinaldi - gave no reason.

==== Week 4 (14 November) ====
Contestants' performances on the fourth live show
Part 1
Act	Order	Song	Result
Davide Rossi	1	"Don't Stop Me Now"	Safe
Giordana Petralia	2	"Highest in the Room"	Bottom two
Sierra	3	"Snow (Hey Oh)"	Safe
Nicola Cavallaro	4	"90 MIN"	Safe
Part 2
Act	Order	Song	Result
Booda	5	"M.I.L.F. $"	Safe
Eugenio Campana	6	"Delicate"	Safe
Seawards	7	"Feel" (original song)	Bottom two
Sofia Tornambene	8	"Papaoutai"	Safe
Final showdown details
Act	Order	Song	Result
Giordana Petralia	9	"Call Out My Name"	Safe
Seawards	10	"Clocks Go Forwards"	Eliminated

Judges' votes to eliminate

- Ebbasta: Seawards - backed his own act, Girodana Petralia.
- Ayane: Seawards - gave no reason.
- Samuel: Girodana Petrali - backed his own act, Seawards.
- Maionchi: Seawards - gave no reason.

==== Week 5 (21 November) ====
Contestants' performances on the fifth live show
Act	Order	Song	Result
Booda	1	"Elefante"	Safe
Giordana Petralia	2	"Chasing Paper"	Final showdown
Sierra	3	"Enfasi"	Safe
Nicola Cavallaro	4	"Like I Could"	Safe
Sofia Tornambene	5	"A domani per sempre"	Safe
Davide Rossi	6	"Glum"	Safe
Eugenio Campagna	7	"Cornflakes"	Safe

There was no elimination that week; the act with the fewest votes sang again in the final showdown in week 6.

==== Week 6: Quarter-final (28 November) ====
Contestants' performances on the sixth live show
Final showdown details
Act	Order	Song	Result
Giordana Petralia	1	"Chasing Paper"	Eliminated
Davide Rossi	2	"Glum"	Safe

Judges' vote to eliminate

- Ebbasta: Davide Rossi - backed his own act, Giordana Petralia.
- Ayane: Giordana Petralia - backed her own act, Davide Rossi.
- Samuel: Giordana Petralia - gave no reason.
- Maionchi: Giordana Petralia - gave no reason.

Act	Order	Song	Result
Sierra	1	"The Ecstasy of Gold"	Safe
Nicola Cavallaro	2	"The Sound of Silence"	Bottom three
Sofia Tornambene	3	"I Love You"	Safe
Davide Rossi	4	"Treat You Better"	Bottom three
Booda	5	"Hold Up"	Bottom three
Eugenio Campagna	6	"Cosa mi manchi a fare"	Safe
Act	Order	Song	Result
Final showdown details
Act	Order	Song	Result
Nicola Cavallaro	1	"Location"	Eliminated
Davide Rossi	2	"Follow Through"	Safe
Booda	3	"212"	Saved

Judges' votes to eliminate

- Maionchi: Davide Rossi - backed her own act, Nicola Cavallaro
- Ayane: Nicola Cavallaro - backed her own act, Davide Rossi
- Ebbasta: Nicola Cavallaro - gave no reason.
- Samuel: Nicola Cavallaro - gave no reason.

==== Week 7: Semi-final (5 December) ====
Contestants' performances on the seventh live show
Round 1
Act	Order	First song	Result
Sierra	1	"Born Slippy .NUXX"	Safe
Sofia Tornambene	2	"Human Nature"	Safe
Davide Rossi	3	"Toxic"	Safe
Booda	4	"Dibby Dibby Sound"	Safe
Eugenio Campagna	5	"Una buona idea"	Bottom two
Round 2
Act	Order	Second song	Result
Davide Rossi	6	"Uptown Funk"	Safe
Sierra	7	"Ni Bien Ni Mal"	Safe
Sofia Tornambene	8	"Love of My Life"	Safe
Booda	9	"Level Up"	Bottom two
Final showdown details
Act	Order	Song	Result
Eugenio Campagna	10	"Glovo" (original song)	Eliminated
Booda	11	"M.I.L.F. $"	Safe

Judge's vote to eliminate

- Maionchi: Booda - backed her own act, Eugenio Campagna.
- Samuel: Eugenio Campagna - backed his own act, Booda.
- Ebbasta: Eugenio Campagna - gave no reason.
- Ayane: Eugenio Campagna - gave no reason.

==== Week 8: Final (12 December) ====
Contestants' performances on the final live show
Round 1
Act	Order	Song	Result
Sofia Tornambene	1	"She's the One" (with Robbie Williams)	Safe
Sierra	2	"Kids" (with Robbie Williams)	Safe
Booda	3	"Supreme" (with Robbie Williams)	Safe
Davide Rossi	4	"Feel" (with Robbie Williams)	4th place
Round 2
Act	Order	Song	Result
Booda	5	"Heartbeat"/"212"/"Hey Mama"	Safe
Sofia Tornambene	6	"Fix You"/"Papaoutai"/"C'est la vie"	Safe
Sierra	7	"Le acciughe fanno il pallone"/"7 Rings"/"Dark Horse"	3rd place
Round 3
Act	Order	Song	Result
Booda	8	"Elefante"	Runner-up
Sofia Tornambene	9	"A domani per sempre"	Winner
