= Vexilloid =

Flag-like object that represents an entity

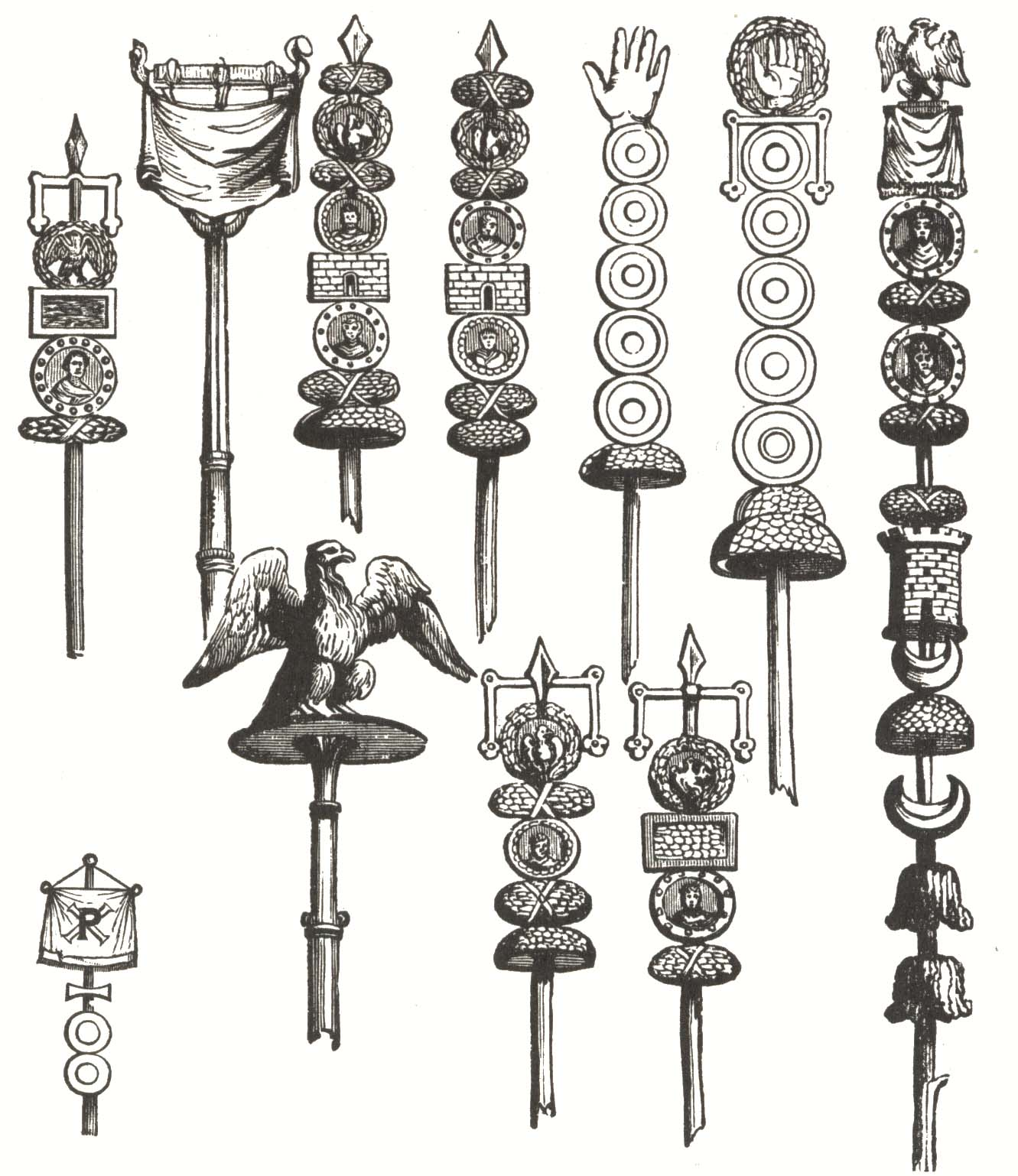
An illustration of eleven Imperial Roman vexilloids.

A vexilloid is any flag-like (vexillary) object used by countries, organisations, or individuals as a form of representation other than flags. American vexillologist Whitney Smith coined the term vexilloid in 1958, defining it as

An object which functions as a flag but differs from it in some respect, usually appearance. Vexilloids are characteristic of traditional societies and often consist of a staff with an emblem, such as a carved animal, at the top.

This includes vexilla, banderoles, pennons, streamers, heraldic flags, standards, and gonfalons. Examples include the Sassanid battle standard Derafsh Kaviani, and the standards of the Roman legions such as the eagle of Augustus Caesar's Xth legion and the dragon standard of the Sarmatians; the latter was allowed to fly freely in the wind, carried by a horseman, but depictions suggest that it bore more similarity to an elongated dragon kite than to a simple flag.

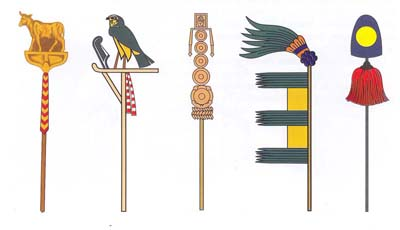
An illustration of several types of vexilloid

The use of flags replaced the use of vexilloids for general purposes during late medieval times between about 1100 to about 1400. However, vexilloids still remain in use for specialised purposes, such as for some military units or to symbolise various organisations such as fraternal organisation in street parades.

== History ==
Vexilloids originally started as a staff of office for leaders of groups, such as tribes, and were also used as a visible sign to rally around or point to a direction of attack. They were originally made of wood, horns, tails, hooves, and skins of animals, with other ornaments being made of carved and painted wood or metal. Aztec vexilloids were composed of green quetzal feathers, metals such as gold, and precious stones. Modern vexilloids used by tribes of New Guinea are made of wood, dried grass and feathers, and emblems painted on wood, feathers, and cloth.

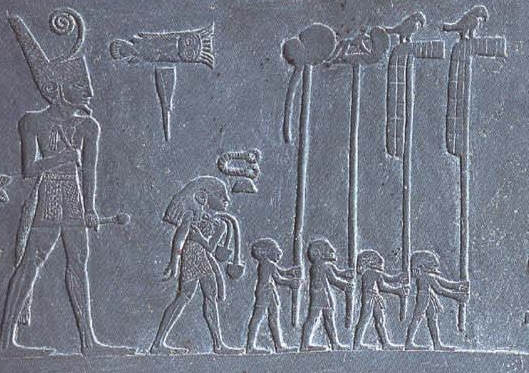
A detail from the Narmer Palette, with the oldest known depiction of vexilloids.

The oldest known vexilloids appear as depictions on Egyptian pottery from the Gerzeh culture and on the reverse of the Narmer Palette. These vexilloids were symbols of the nomes of pre-dynastic Egypt. The oldest surviving vexilloid was carried in Persia around 5,000 years ago. It consists of a metal staff topped with an eagle, and a square of metal covered with reliefs. Two vexilloids are depicted on the Victory Stele of Naram-Sin. In Alaca Höyük, archaeologists have discovered Hittite vexilloids dating from c.2400–2200 BCE, having finials depicting bulls, stags, as well as abstract forms often interpreted as solar symbols.

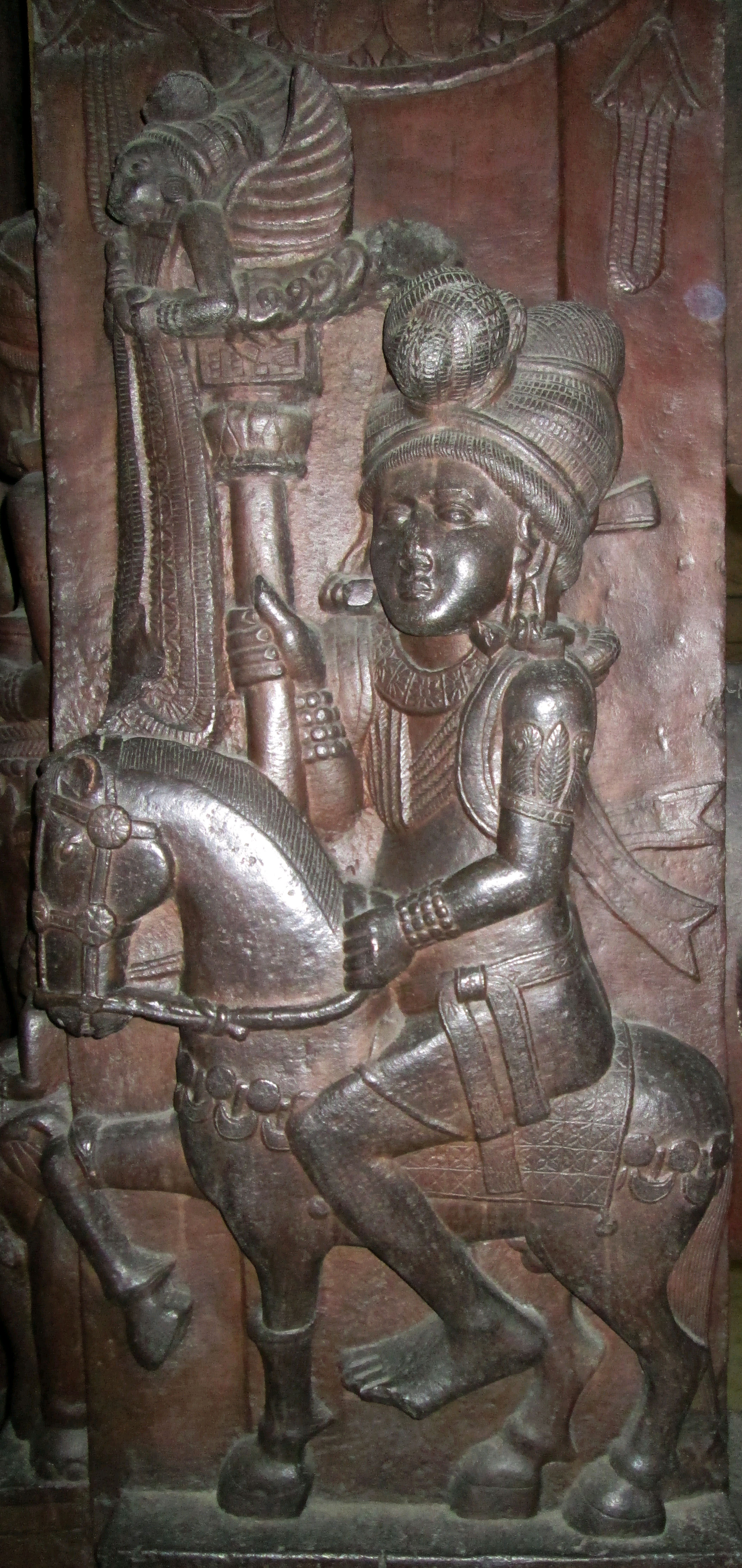
Shunga horseman holding a vexilloid standard. Bharhut.

Ancient Greek armies used a vexillum-like banners, such as the so-called phoinikis, a cloth of deep red, suspended from the top of a staff or spear. It is not known to have carried any device or decoration though.

Ancient Romans adopted the use of vexilloids, as well as their eagle emblem, from the Persians. The standards of Roman legions consisted of a lance with a silver-plated shaft, topped with a crosspiece carrying figures of various beasts, the most important being the eagle. Attached to the shaft were several metal rings which took the form of laurel wreaths and medallions with images of gods, the Emperor, and members of the Imperial House.

Ancient Mongolians also used vexilloids in the form of a staff topped with a metal ball or spearhead, with a horse's tail attached to it. This vexilloid, called a tug, spread among Turkish people and became military symbols in Turkish forces. In the 17th and 18th centuries they were carried before commanders-in-chief of the Polish Army.

== Examples ==
=== Ancient ===
- The Achaemenid Empire used a stylised falcon on its vexilloid.
- The vexilloid of Alexander the Great's Macedonian Empire displayed the Vergina Sun.
- The Greco-Bactrian Kingdom has an Elephant as their symbol.
- The Indo-Greek Kingdom has The Buddhist Triratna as their symbol.
- The Indo-Scythians has a Lion or a Leopard standing right as their symbol.
- The vexilloid of The Indo-Parthian Kingdom is likely pretty similar to The Parthian Sun and it is related with The Derafsh Kaviani.
- The vexilloid of The Kushan Empire is suspended on the point of a Spear or Trident
- The symbol of the Mauryan Empire was the Ashoka Chakra.
- The Gupta Empire has The Garuda as their symbol.
- The vexilloid of Ancient Carthage most probably consisted of a spear with a disk and crescent (points upwards), symbolising the god Baal (sun = disk) and the goddess Tanit (moon = crescent).
- The Ptolemaic Kingdom has The Eagle of Zeus as their symbol.
- The vexillum of Ancient Rome displayed the slogan S·P·Q·R (senātus populusque Rōmānus), "The Roman Senate and People", in gold on a field of crimson.
- The Sassanian Empire, which is called Eran Shahr (Aryan Empire) in Middle Persian, used lotus symbol on its vexilloid, which is called the Derafsh Kaviani.

Vexilloid of Baden Garde Du Corps 1740–1919

=== Medieval ===
- The tugh of Central Asian and Turkic peoples of the pre-Ottoman and Ottoman periods.
- The vexilloid of the Mongol Empire, the "Yöson Khölt tsagaan tug" (Mongolian: Есөн хөлт цагаан туг) or the "Nine Base White Banners", was composed of nine flag poles decorated with nine off-white horse tail hairs hanging from a round surface with a flame or trident-like shape on the top at the centre. The Nine White Banners was a peacetime emblem used by the Khan in front of his yurt. The war flag of the Mongol Empire was the same as the banner at right, except the horse tails were off-black instead of off-white as they were cut from black instead of white horses.
- Heraldic flags are forms of vexilloids with designs based on heraldry, a famous example being the Oriflamme of France.
- The Chola Empire had the tiger as their symbol and flag.

=== Modern ===
- The French Imperial Eagle was a figure of an eagle on a staff carried into battle by the Grande Armée of Napoleon during the Napoleonic Wars.
- In Nazi Germany, also referred to as the Third Reich, the SS used vexilloids which they marched with in street parades and at the Nuremberg rallies. These vexilloids were topped with an eagle and a swastika and with the name of the particular locale of the SS contingent carrying the vexilloids. Inscribed on them was the slogan Deutschland Erwache, which means Germany Awake.
- Individuals create festival totems of various designs on top of extendable staffs to identify themselves in disorienting crowds at music festivals.

== Sources ==
- Smith, Whitney (1975). Flags Through the Ages and Across the World. New York: McGraw-Hill. ISBN 0-07-059093-1.
