= Totem pole (disambiguation) =

A totem pole is an Indigenous Pacific Northwest artifact.

Totem pole may refer to:

- Ed Galloway's Totem Pole Park, in Rogers County, Oklahoma
- Totem pole output, also known as a push-pull output, a type of electronic circuit
- The Totem Pole (Tasmania), a rock spire/sea stack in Tasmania, Australia
- Melaleuca decussata, a plant species with the common name Totem Poles
- Totem Pole (Monument Valley), one of the geological features in Monument Valley

== See also ==
- Pole (disambiguation)
- Totem (disambiguation)
