= X Factor (Italian TV series) season 14 =

X Factor
- Season 14
- Hosted by: Alessandro Cattelan
- Judges: Mika; Hell Raton; Manuel Agnelli; Emma Marrone
- Winner: Casadilego
- Winning mentor: Hell Raton
- Runner-up: Little Pieces of Marmelade

Release
- Original network: Sky Uno; TV8
- Original release: 17 September – 10 December 2020

Season chronology
- ← Previous; Season 13

X Factor is an Italian television music competition to find new singing talent; the winner receives a recording contract with Sony Music. fourteenth season was aired on Sky Uno and TV8 since September 2020. All of the judges from the previous year were replaced; the show seeing the returns of Mika and Manuel Agnelli, and new judges Emma Marrone and Hell Raton. Casadilegon won the competition and Hell Raton became the winning coach for the first time.

== Judges' houses ==
The "Home Visit" is the final phase before the Live Shows. In this phase, the contestants who passed the "Bootcamp" had to perform one last time in front of their specific judge, in four different locations. At the end of this audition, the top twelve contestants were chosen.

The eight eliminated acts were:

- Boys: Leo Meconi, Giuseppe Roccuzzo (Roccuzzo)
- Girls: Alessandra Ciccariello (Ale), Daria Huber
- 25+: Gabriel Covino (Kaima), Claudio Luisi (Disarmo)
- Groups: Wime, Yellow Monday

== Contestants and categories ==
Key:

– Winner
– Runner-up
– Third place

Category (mentor)	Acts		
Boys (Marrone)	Blind (Franco Rujan)	Blue Phelix (Francesco Franco)	Santi (Filippo Santi)
Girls (Raton)	Casadilego (Elisa Coclite)	Cmqmartina (Martina Sironi)	Mydrama (Alessandra Martinelli)
25+ (Mika)	Eda Marì (Edda Maria Sessa)	N.A.I.P. (Michelangelo Mercuri)	Vergo (Giuseppe Piscitello)
Groups (Agnelli)	Little Pieces of Marmelade	Manitoba	Melancholia

== Live shows ==
=== Results summary ===
The number of votes received by each act will be released by Sky Italia after the final.

Colour key

–	Contestant was in the bottom two/three and had to sing again in the final showdown
–	Contestant received the fewest public votes and was immediately eliminated (no final showdown)
–	Contestant received the most public votes

Contestant	Week 1		Week 2			Week 3		Week 4		Quarter-final			Semifinal	Final		
Contestant	Part 1	Part 2	Single streams	Part 1	Part 2	Part 1	Part 2	Round 1	Round 2	Round 1	Single streams	Round 2	Round 1 & 2	Round 1	Round 2	Round 3
Casadilego	2nd	—N/a	Safe	—N/a	1st	—N/a	2nd	2nd	4th	1st	Safe	1st	3rd	1st	2nd	Winner; 50,96%
Little Pieces of Marmelade	3rd	—N/a	Safe	3rd	—N/a	2nd	—N/a	5th	5th	6th	Safe	3rd	2nd	3rd	1st	Runner-up; 49,04%
Blind	1st	—N/a	Safe	2nd	—N/a	1st	—N/a	1st	1st	3rd	Safe	4th	4th	2nd	3rd	Eliminated (Final)
N.A.I.P.	—N/a	3rd	Safe	5th	—N/a	—N/a	3rd	3rd	2nd	2nd	Final Showdown	2nd	1st	4th	Eliminated (Final)	
Mydrama	—N/a	2nd	Safe	1st	—N/a	—N/a	4th	6th	7th	4th	Safe	5th	5th	Eliminated (Semi-final)		
Cmqmartina	4th	—N/a	Safe	4th	—N/a	3rd	—N/a	7th	6th	5th	Safe	6th	Eliminated (Quarter-final)			
Melancholia	—N/a	1st	Safe	—N/a	2nd	—N/a	1st	4th	3rd	7th	—N/a	Eliminated (Quarter-final)				
Vergo	—N/a	4th	Safe	—N/a	3rd	4th	—N/a	8th	8th	Eliminated (Week 4)						
Blue Phelix	5th	—N/a	Safe	—N/a	4th	—N/a	5th	9th	Eliminated (Week 4)							
Santi	—N/a	5th	Final Showdown	—N/a	5th	5th	—N/a	Eliminated (Week 3)								
Manitoba	—N/a	6th	Safe	6th	—N/a	Eliminated (Week 2)										
Eda Marì	6th	—N/a	—N/a	Eliminated (Week 2)												
Final Showdown	Eda Marì, Manitoba		Eda Marì, Santi	Manitoba, Santi		Santi, Blue Phelix		Mydrama, Vergo		Melancholia, N.A.I.P.		Cmqmartina, Mydrama	Blind, Mydrama	No final showdown or judges' vote: results will be based on public votes alone		
Emma's vote to eliminate	Eda Marì		Eda Marì	Manitoba		Santi		Vergo		N.A.I.P.		Cmqmartina	Mydrama	No final showdown or judges' vote: results will be based on public votes alone		
Hell Raton's vote to eliminate	Eda Marì		Eda Marì	Manitoba		Santi		Vergo		Melancholia		Cmqmartina	Blind	No final showdown or judges' vote: results will be based on public votes alone		
Manuel's vote to eliminate	Eda Marì		Santi	Santi		Blue Phelix		Mydrama		N.A.I.P.		Cmqmartina	Mydrama	No final showdown or judges' vote: results will be based on public votes alone		
Mikas vote to eliminate	Manitoba		Santi	Manitoba		Santi		Mydrama		Melancholia		Mydrama	Mydrama	No final showdown or judges' vote: results will be based on public votes alone		
Eliminated	Eda Marì; 3 of 4 votes majority put through to the final showdown in week 2		Eda Marì; Public vote to save	Manitoba; 3 of 4 votes majority		Santi; 3 of 4 votes majority		Blue Phelix; Public vote to save		Melancholia; Public vote to save		Cmqmartina; 3 of 4 votes majority	Mydrama; 3 of 4 votes majority	N.A.I.P. Public vote to win	Blind; Public vote to win	Little Pieces of Marmelade; Public vote to win
Eliminated	Eda Marì; 3 of 4 votes majority put through to the final showdown in week 2		Eda Marì; Public vote to save	Manitoba; 3 of 4 votes majority		Santi; 3 of 4 votes majority		Vergo; Public vote to save		Melancholia; Public vote to save		Cmqmartina; 3 of 4 votes majority	Mydrama; 3 of 4 votes majority	N.A.I.P. Public vote to win	Blind; Public vote to win	Little Pieces of Marmelade; Public vote to win

=== Live show details ===
==== Week 1 (29 October) ====
Contestants' performances on the first live show
Part 1
Act	Order	Song	Result
Blind	1	"Cuore nero"	Safe
Cmqmartina	2	"Serpente"	Safe
Eda Marì	3	"Male"	Bottom two
Little Pieces of Marmelade	4	"One Cup of Happiness"	Safe
Blue Phelix	5	"South Dakota"	Safe
Casadilego	6	"Vittoria"	Safe
Part 2
Act	Order	Song	Result
Manitoba	7	"La domenica"	Bottom two
Vergo	8	"Bomba"	Safe
Santi	9	"Bonsai"	Safe
Mydrama	10	"Cornici bianche"	Safe
N.A.I.P.	11	"Attenti al loop"	Safe
Melancholia	12	"Léon"	Safe
Final showdown details
Act	Order	Song	Result
Eda Marì	13	-	Final Showdown
Manitoba	14	-	Safe

Judges' votes to send through to the final showdown next week

- Agnelli: Eda Marì - backed his own act, Manitoba.
- Mika: Manitoba - backed his own act, Eda Marì.
- Marrone: Eda Marì - gave no reason.
- Raton: Eda Marì - gave no reason.

==== Week 2 (5 November) ====
Contestants' performances on the second live show
Final showdown details
Act	Order	Song	Result
Eda Marì	1	"Male"	Eliminated
Santi	2	"Bonsai"	Safe
Part 1
Act	Order	Song	Result
Little Pieces of Marmelade	1	"Sabotage"	Safe
Mydrama	2	"Bella così"	Safe
N.A.I.P.	3	"Bla Bla Bla"	Safe
Blind	4	"Piece of Your Heart"/"Non mi dire di no"	Safe
Cmqmartina	5	"Il mio canto libero"	Safe
Manitoba	6	"I Wanna Be Sedated"	Bottom two
Part 2
Act	Order	Song	Result
Melancholia	7	"Bloodmoney"	Safe
Blue Phelix	8	"Sciccherie"	Safe
Vergo	9	"E ritorno da te"	Safe
Santi	10	"8 miliardi di persone"	Bottom two
Casadilego	11	"Xanny"	Safe
Final showdown details
Act	Order	Song	Result
Manitoba	12	"La domenica"	Eliminated
Santi	13	"Bonsai"	Safe

Judges' votes to eliminate (round 1)

- Mika: Santi - backed his own act, Eda Marì.
- Marrone: Eda Marì - backed her own act, Santi.
- Agnelli: Santi - gave no reason.
- Raton: Eda Marì - gave no reason.

With the acts in the sing-off receiving two votes each, the result was deadlocked and a new public vote commenced for 200 seconds. Eda Marì was eliminated as the act with the fewest public votes.

Judges' votes to eliminate (round 2)

- Agnelli: Santi - backed his own act, Manitoba.
- Marrone: Manitoba - backed her own act, Santi.
- Mika: Manitoba - gave no reason.
- Raton: Manitoba - gave no reason.

==== Week 3 (12 November) ====
Contestants' performances on the third live show
Part 1
Act	Order	Song	Result
Cmqmartina	1	"Sparami"	Safe
Blind	2	"Cicatrici"	Safe
Vergo	3	"La cura"	Safe
Little Pieces of Marmelade	4	"L.P.O.M."	Safe
Santi	5	"Morrison"	Bottom two
Part 2
Act	Order	Song	Result
Blue Phelix	6	"Mi ami"	Bottom two
Mydrama	7	"Vieni con me"	Safe
N.A.I.P.	8	"Oh oh oh"	Safe
Casadilego	9	"Lontanissimo"	Safe
Melancholia	10	"Grounds"	Safe
Final showdown details
Act	Order	Song	Result
Santi	11	"Bonsai"	Eliminated
Blue Phelix	12	"South Dakota"	Safe

Judges' votes to eliminate

- Agnelli: Blue Phelix - gave no reason.
- Marrone: Santi - gave no reason.
- Mika: Santi - gave no reason.
- Raton: Santi - gave no reason.

==== Week 4 (19 November) ====
Contestants' performances on the fourth live show
Round 1
Act	Order	Song	Result
Vergo	1	"Bomba"	Safe
Casadilego	2	"Vittoria"	Safe
Blind	3	"Cuore Nero"	Safe
Melancholia	4	"Léon"	Safe
Cmqmartina	5	"Sparami"	Safe
Little Pieces of Marmelade	6	"One Cup of Happiness"	Safe
Blue Phelix	7	"South Dakota"	Eliminated
N.A.I.P.	8	"Attenti al loop"	Safe
Mydrama	9	"Vieni con me"	Safe
Round 2
Act	Order	Song	Result
Mydrama	1	"Notti"	Bottom two
N.A.I.P.	2	"Amandoti"	Safe
Melancholia	3	"Sweet Dreams (Are Made of This)"	Safe
Blind	4	"Per me è importante"/"Bambino"	Safe
Cmqmartina	5	"Albero"	Safe
Vergo	6	"Oro"/"Pienso en tu mirà"/"Malamente"	Bottom two
Casadilego	7	"Rapide"	Safe
Little Pieces of Marmelade	8	"Bullet with Butterfly Wings"	Safe
Final showdown details
Act	Order	Song	Result
Mydrama	-	-	Safe
Vergo	-	-	Eliminated

Judges' votes to eliminate

- Mika: Mydrama - backed his own act, Vergo.
- Raton: Vergo - backed his own act, Mydrama.
- Agnelli: Mydrama - gave no reason.
- Marrone: Vergo - gave no reason.

With the acts in the sing-off receiving two votes each, the result was deadlocked and a new public vote commenced for 200 seconds. Vergo was eliminated as the act with the fewest public votes.

==== Week 5 (26 November) ====
Contestants' performances on the fifth live show
Round 1
Act	Order	Song	Result
Little Pieces of Marmelade	1	"I Am the Walrus"	Safe
Cmqmartina	2	"La prima cosa bella"	Safe
Blind	3	"In the End/"Tremo"	Safe
N.A.I.P.	4	"Storia d'amore"	Bottom two
Mydrama	5	"Piccola anima"	Safer
Melancholia	6	"Hunter"	Bottom two
Casadilego	7	"Dance Monkey"	Safe
Final showdown details
Act	Order	Song	Result
N.A.I.P.	-	-	Safe
Melancholia	-	-	Eliminated
Round 2
Act	Order	Song	Result
Cmqmartina	1	"Lasciami andare!"	Bottom two
Mydrama	2	"Crudelia"	Bottom two
Blind	3	"Affari tuoi"	Safe
Casadilego	4	Yesterday"	Safe
Little Pieces of Marmalade	5	"Digital Cramps"	Safe
N.A.I.P.	6	"Partecipo"	Safe
Final showdown details
Act	Order	Song	Result
Mydrama	-	-	Safe
Cmqmartina	-	-	Eliminated

Judges' votes to eliminate (round 1)

- Agnelli: N.A.I.P. - backed his own act, Melancholia.
- Mika: Melancholia - backed his own act, N.A.I.P.
- Marrone: N.A.I.P. - gave no reason.
- Raton: Melancholia - gave no reason.

With the acts in the sing-off receiving two votes each, the result was deadlocked and a new public vote commenced for 200 seconds. Melancholia was eliminated as the act with the fewest public votes.

Judges' votes to eliminate (Round 2)

- Mika: Mydrama - gave no reason.
- Raton: Cmqmartina - gave no reason.
- Agnelli: Cmqmartina - gave no reason.
- Marrone: Cmqmartina - gave no reason.

==== Week 6: Semi-final (3 December) ====
Contestants' performances on the sixth live show
Act	Order	First song	Order	Second song	Result
Blind	1	"Baby"	7	"Good Times"/"Como habla"	Bottom two
Casadilego	2	"Catrame"	10	"Lego House"	Safe
Little Pieces of Marmelade	3	"Muori delay"	8	"Gimme All Your Love"	Safe
Mydrama	4	"Chic"	6	"Spigoli"	Bottom two
N.A.I.P.	5	"La canzone mononota"	9	"Milano circonvallazione esterna"	Safe
Final showdown details
Act	Order	Song			Result
Mydrama	1	"Cornici bianche"			Eliminated
Blind	2	"Cuore nero"			Saved

Judges' votes to eliminate

- Marrone: Mydrama - backed her own act, Blind.
- Raton: Blind - backed his own act, Mydrama.
- Agnelli: Mydrama - gave no reason.
- Mika: Mydrama - gave no reason.

==== Week 7: Final (10 December) ====
Contestants' performances on the final live show
Round 1
Act	Order	Song	Result
Little Pieces of Marmelade	1	"Veleno" with Manuel Agnelli	Safe
Blind	2	"La Fine" with Emma Marrone	Safe
N.A.I.P.	3	"Lollipop" with Mika	4th Place
Casadilego	4	"Stan" with Hell Raton	Safe
Round 2
Act	Order	Song	Result
Casadilego	5	"Kitchen Sink"/"Xanny"/"A Case of You"	Safe
Blind	6	"Bambino"/"Cicatrici"/"Affari tuoi"	3rd Place
Little Pieces of Marmelade	7	"I Am the Walrus"/"Bullet with Butterfly Wings"/"Give Me All Your Love"	Safe
Round 3
Act	Order	Song	Result
Casadilego	8	"Vittoria"	Winner
Little Pieces of Marmelade	9	"One Cup of Happiness"	Runner-up
