= Anna Ferzetti =

Italian actress (born 1982)

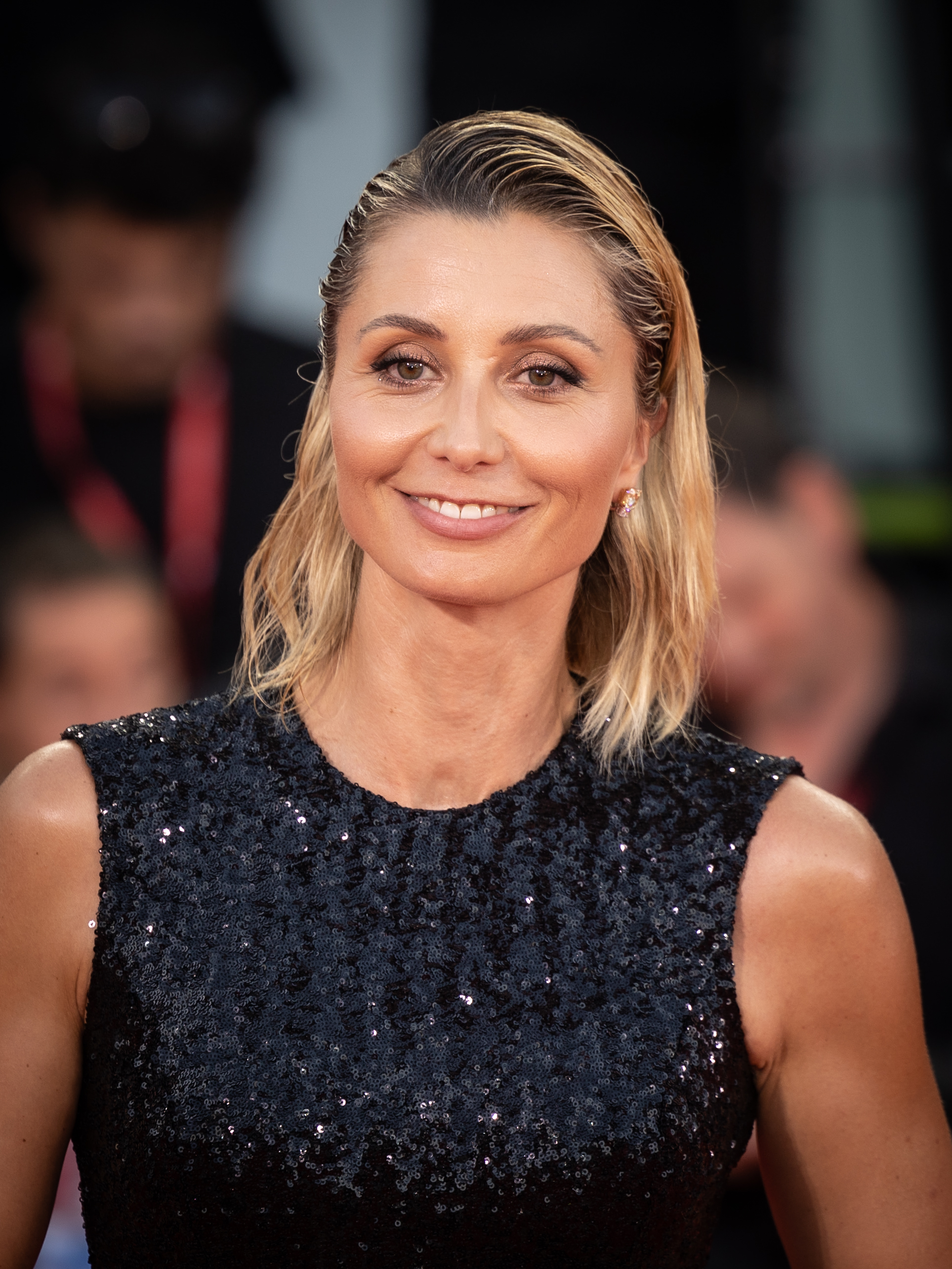
- Ferzetti at the 81st Venice International Film Festival in 2024
- Born: 24 December 1982 (age 43); Rome, Italy
- Occupation: Actress
- Years active: 2002–present
- Partner: Pierfrancesco Favino (2003–present)
- Children: 2
- Father: Gabriele Ferzetti

Anna Ferzetti (born 24 December 1982) is an Italian actress.

== Early life ==
Ferzetti was born to actor Gabriele Ferzetti and Claudia Verdini. She attended private school in Germany. At the age of 11, she and her mother moved to London. At the age of 18, she left home to move to Rome. Before pursuing acting, she worked as a news agent, a waitress, a tour guide, a canoe instructor, and a pharmacy assistant.

== Career ==
She made her professional acting debut in the 2002 television film Le ragazze di Miss Italia. In 2019, she co-hosted PrimaFestival, part of the Sanremo Music Festival 2019.

== Personal life ==
She has been in a relationship with Pierfrancesco Favino since 2003. They have two daughters, Greta and Lea.

== Filmography ==
=== Film ===
Year	Title	Role	Ref.
2008	A Perfect Day	Emma's colleague	
2010	Due vite per caso	Nurse	
2010	Sul mare	Milanese woman	
2014	Stalker	Giulia	
2014	Short Skin	Anna	
2016	Slam	ASL secretary	
2017	Il colore nascosto delle cose	Greta	
2017	Couple Therapy for Cheaters	Nelide	
2017	Finding Camille	Camille	
2019	All My Loving	Livia	
2019	Tomorrow's a New Day	Paola	
2020	Tutti per 1 - 1 per tutti	Enrichetta	
2021	Quarantenni in salita	Sara	
2021	3/19	Bea	
2022	(Im)perfetti criminali	Francesca	
2022	My Soul Summer	Ludovica	
2023	The Worst Days	Flavia	
2024	The Story of Frank and Nina	Frank's mother	
2024	Diamonds	Paolina	
2025	Il nibbio	Rosa Calipari	
2025	La grazia	Dorotea De Santis	
2025	The Eyes of Others	Rossella	
2026	Domani interrogo	Professor	

=== Television ===
Year	Title	Role	Notes	Ref.
2002	Le ragazze di Miss Italia	Bride	Television film	
2003	Il maresciallo Rocca	Cameo	1 episode	
2009	RIS Delitti Imperfetti	Vittoria Mancinelli	1 episode	
2009	Puccini	Head nurse	Television film	
2009	Pane e libertà	Baroness Santamaria	Television film	
2011	Anti-Drug Squad	Teresa	2 episodes	
2011	L'ombra del destino	Milva Principato	Miniseries	
2011	Rex	Francesca Bernardi	1 episode	
2013	Ultimo - L'occhio del falco	Maria	Television film	
2013	Benvenuti a tavola - Nord vs Sud		1 episode	
2013	Il Natale della mamma imperfetta	Irene	Television film	
2013	Una mamma imperfetta	Irene	1 episode	
2014	Il tredicesimo apostolo	Teresa	11 episodes	
2015	Braccialetti rossi	Bea's mother	5 episodes	
2016–2023	Rocco Schiavone	Adele Talamonti	13 episodes	
2017	Amore pensaci tu	Giulia Arnaboldi	2 episodes	
2018	Skam Italia	Paola	5 episodes	
2018	Carlo & Malik	Gabriella Simondi	1 episode	
2019	L'amore, il sole e l'altre stelle	Teacher	Television film	
2019	Duisburg - Linea di sangue	Alessandra Battaglia	Television film	
2019	I segreti del mestiere	Sabrina	Television film	
2020	Curon	Klara	7 episodes	
2022	Volevo fare la rockstar	Silvia	8 episodes	
2022	The Ignorant Angels	Roberta	5 episodes	
2023	Call My Agent - Italia	Herself	1 episode	
2023	Un'estate fa	Lauretta	5 episodes	
2024	Antonia		6 episodes	
2024	This Is Not Hollywood	Daniela		

== Awards and nominations ==
Award	Year	Category	Work(S)	Result	Ref.
Ciak d'oro	2022	Best Supporting Actress	Tutti per 1 - 1 per tutti	Nominated	
David di Donatello	2020	Best Supporting Actress	Domani è un altro giorno	Nominated	
David di Donatello	2026	Best Actress	La grazia	Pending	
Nastro d'argento	2019	Best Supporting Actress	Domani è un altro giorno	Nominated	
Nastro d'argento	2025	Nastro d'argento Special Award	Diamonds	Won	
Nastro d'argento – Grandi Serie	2022	Best Supporting Actress	The Ignorant Angels	Won	
Premi Flaiano	2022	Best Acting Performance in Television	The Ignorant Angels	Won	
Venice Film Festival	2025	Pasinetti Award	La grazia	Won	
