= Enigma (rapper) =

Italian rapper

Francesco Marcello Scano (born in Olbia, December 2, 1988), professionally known as Enigma (stylized as En?gma), is an Italian rapper. He is mostly known for the project he created with Salmo, Slait and Hell Raton, Machete Empire Records, which he left for reasons not yet fully certain.

== Biography ==
=== Early years (2008–2013) ===
He approached the world of music in 2008, collecting some of his songs in a demo entitled Anonymous and consisting of 15 tracks with non-original instrumental bases. Shortly thereafter he began performing in his hometown and until 2010 he joined MC RockBirken. In June 2010 he triumphed at the Can I Kick It in Treviso, a freestyle contest organized and managed by Mistaman and DJ Shocca, then repeating itself in September in a competition of unreleased songs.

In 2011 he released his debut album Coma, which he wrote and produced with the exception of collaborations with Salmo and Rock Birken. From September of the same year, following the success of Salmo's first studio album, which includes his featuring in the songs Back on Track and Munchies, he took part with Hell Raton and DJ Slait at The Island Chainsaw Massacre Tour of Psalm.

In 2012 he took part in the creation of the mixtapes Machete Mixtape and Machete Mixtape Vol II, discs composed of unreleased and remixes of the artists belonging to the Machete Crew as well as the participation of various exponents of the Italian hip hop scene, like Bassi Maestro, Ensi, MadMan, Gemitaiz, Primo, Egreen and Squarta. In the same period he collaborated again with Salmo in Death USB in the song Senza and with DJ Slait in the realization of Bloody Vinyl Mixtape, the first solo project of the Sardinian DJ.

In 2013 he released with Salmo, DJ Slait and Hell Raton the single The Island, later included in the deluxe edition of the third album by Salmo Midnite. In October of the same year he released his first EP Rebus EP published by Machete Empire Records.

=== Foga and other projects (2014–2015) ===
On 1 April 2014 Enigma released the second studio album Foga, the first released with Machete Empire Records. The album, which includes numerous collaborations with rappers and producers including Salmo, Bassi Maestro, Nitro and Jack the Smoker, debuted at the fourth position of the FIMI album chart. In September of the same year Machete Mixtape III was published, promoted by the videos of Antieroi and Machetero, the latter made with Jack the Smoker. The following month Enigma participated with the other artists of the collective in the Machete Mixtape Vol. III – Live Tour, a series of concerts for the whole Italian peninsula in order to promote the album.

In early 2015 Enigma participated in a number of projects, first appearing in DJ Slait's new solo work Bloody Vinyl Mixtape Vol. 2, then collaborating with Linea 77 on their album Oh! in Divide et impera and finally in the realization of the EP Random with the producer Kaizén. On July 15 he made his second solo EP Dedalo available for free download, consisting of seven songs written and recorded on previously released instrumentals.

=== Machete exit, Indaco (2016) ===
In March 2016 Enigma collaborated with Jack the Smoker in the realization of the song La mia lama, inserted in the fourth album of the latter, Jack uccide. 2016 also marked the release of the rapper's third album, Indaco (in Italian: Indigo), released on October 14 and anticipated in September by the video clip of the song of the same name. The album debuted in sixth place in the FIMI Album Chart and was promoted by the Indaco Tour, which took place throughout Italy.

This album also represents the artist's first independent release following his release from the Machete Crew, which occurred due to different visions on a musical level. The real reason for the exit is still unknown, but Enigma's former colleague and friend Hell Raton, notable Sardinian rapper with Ecuadorian origins, said this in an interview with Rockit in 2019:

“I no longer have relations with En?gma, I don't think I would be able to go on stage with him again. People often ask us questions about him, some even insult us, but do you know why? Because after leaving Machete he made three albums against us. We could have argued publicly, but we preferred to confine everything to a private dimension. It was a choice we made to protect Machete, to avoid dirtying its name. A good manager must know how to manage the loss of an artist“.

— Hell Raton, interview by Rockit in 2019

The discussion between Enigma and the Machete Crew its still active today: in fact, to celebrate the 10 years of the crew in 2020 many artists among which Jack The Smoker, Nitro or Hell Raton himself shared photos or phrases to thank people that helped this project and to celebrate this event on their Instagram Stories, but cutting the photos concerning Machete so that Enigma was not visible. Only the rapper Salmo posted a complete photo in which the Sardinian rapper was visible and he also wrote in another story without directly mentioning him: "THANKS TO WHO, IN ONE WAY OR ANOTHER, WAS PART OF THIS FAMILY. MACHETE ONE LOVE.".

=== Shardana and Terranova (2017–2018) ===
During 2017 Enigma released the singles Cerbero and ImagiNation for digital download, accompanied by their respective video clips made available through its YouTube channel. On December 6 of the same year the single Krav Maga was presented, aimed at anticipating the rapper's fourth album of unreleased songs. Entitled Shardana, the album was released on 23 February 2018 and was also promoted by the singles Copernico and Nuvole & cupole; in it there are ten total songs, some of which made with the participation of Bassi Maestro, MadMan and Gemello of the TruceKlan. For the promotion of the album Enigma held some instore dates, where he met fans through dedicated venues, and the Shardana Tour. In his first week Shardana debuted in seventh place in the FIMI rankings, and concurrently with the release of the album Enigma publishes the video of Da Vinci fourth extracted from him.

On April 27, 2018, two months after Shardana, Enigma released the single Eremita, which was followed on June 22 by Golgotha, whose video clip was directed by Corrado Perria and Paolo Maneglia. These two songs turned out to be the first two extracts of the fifth album Terranova, released by surprise on June 29 and written jointly with rappers Noia and Quint Mille and completely realized at the K Studio in Kaizén. During the year she collaborated with the aforementioned Noia and Quint Mille on the song Senza tempo, featured on Noia's debut album Grigionoia.

=== Booriana and Totem (2019-now) ===
On April 5, 2019, the sixth album Booriana was presented, anticipated in March by the single Misunderstanding. Contrary to the last two discs, this is the first publication in which Enigma also covered the role of music producer as well as the one that was characterized by more varied and elaborate sounds. Among the thirteen songs on the album, there are some made in collaboration with other artists, including Ghemon, Shade and Emis Killa.

After a short break spent composing new material, on September 25, 2020, Enigma released the single "Bomaye", which he produced together with Kaizén and which anticipated the Totem project, a disc divided into several parts. The first of these, Totem – Episodio uno, was made available on October 16 of the same year. On January 11, 2021, it was the turn of Totem – Episodio due, containing three songs, one of which with Murubutu. On February 10, 2021, En?gma releases the third EP of the saga Totem – Episodio tre, containing three songs which also boasts a song with the production of DJ Squarta and it boasts also an important collaboration with Claver Gold. Enigma announced on his Instagram profile the fourth episode of the Totem saga Totem – Episodio quattro on March 29, 2021, also saying that it will not be the last chapter of the series. On April 14, the fourth EP of the saga was released, also containing important featurings like Jake La Furia or Mattak.

== Discography ==
=== Studio albums ===
- 2010 – Coma
- 2014 – Foga
- 2016 – Indaco
- 2018 – Shardana
- 2018 – Terranova (with Noia and Quintmille)
- 2019 – Booriana
- 2025 - Tèmpora

=== EPs ===
- 2013 – Rebus EP
- 2015 – Random (with Kaizèn)
- 2015 – Dedalo
- 2020 – start of the Totem saga
  - 2020 – Totem - Episodio uno
  - 2021 – Totem - Episodio due
  - 2021 – Totem - Episodio tre
  - 2021 – Totem - Episodio quattro

=== Singles ===
- 2017 – Cerbero
- 2017 – ImagiNation
- 2017 – Krav Maga
- 2018 – Copernico
- 2018 – Nuvole & cupole
- 2018 – Eremita
- 2018 – Golgotha
- 2019 – Misunderstanding
- 2020 – Bomaye

=== Collaborations ===
- 2012 – Machete Crew – Machete Mixtape
- 2012 – Machete Crew – Machete Mixtape Vol II
- 2014 – Machete Crew – Machete Mixtape III
