= Vexillum =

Military standard of the ancient Roman army

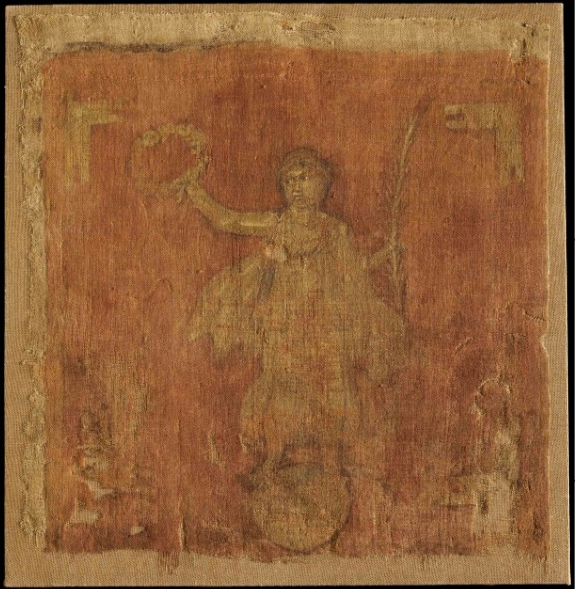
The only extant Roman vexillum, 3rd Century AD. Pushkin Museum of Fine Arts, Russia.

The vexillum (/vɛkˈsɪləm/; pl.: vexilla) was a flag-like object used as a military standard by units in the Roman army. A common vexillum displayed imagery of the Roman aquila on a reddish backdrop.

== History ==
=== Republican era ===
During the Samnite Wars the legions began using the vexillum alongside a lot of personal and religious insigna, mostly by cavalry units. As time went on, the manipular Roman Army began using the vexillum to communicate between units and commanders.

=== Marian reforms ===
Gaius Marius reorganized the Roman army, including its insigna, in 104 BC. Marius made the aquila (eagle) the sole symbol of the Roman legion, hence standardizing the vexillum either. From that point on, the vexillum took a more specific and different role compared to other insigna.

=== Imperial era ===
In this period the use of vexillum was relegated to complex tactical and administrative roles. It became the ufficial symbol of temporary units detached from the legion, which indeed took the name vexillationes.

== Use in Roman armies ==
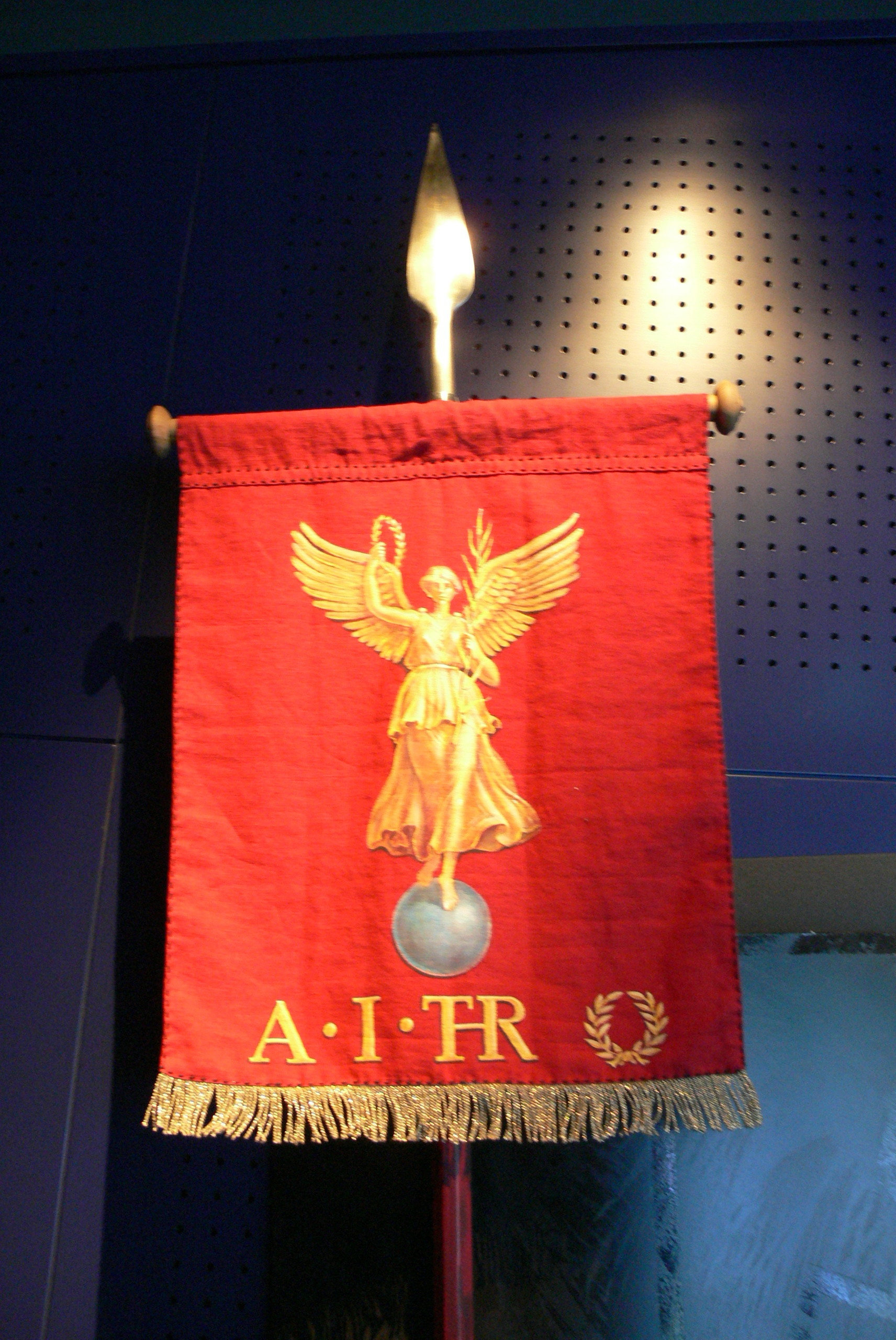
Modern reproduction of a Roman cavalry vexillum

The word vexillum is a diminutive analogue of the Latin word velum, meaning "a sail", which confirms the historical evidence (from coins and sculpture) that vexilla were literally "little sails": flag-like standards. In the vexillum, the cloth was draped from a horizontal crossbar suspended from a staff (unlike most modern flags, in which the "hoist" of the cloth is attached directly to a vertical staff). The bearer of a vexillum was known as a vexillarius or vexillifer.

Just as in the case of the regimental colors or flags of early-modern Western regiments, the vexillum was a treasured symbol of the military unit that it represented and it was closely defended in combat. It was the main standard of some types of units, especially of cavalry; however, it was regarded as less important than a legion's aquila (eagle), and may have represented a subdivision of a legion. However, that is not entirely clear from surviving sources (see vexillatio).

The only known surviving Roman military vexillum, dated to the first half of the 3rd century AD, is housed in the Pushkin Museum of Fine Arts in Moscow. It is an almost square piece of coarse linen cloth with an image of the goddess Victoria, and measures 47×50 cm. The lower edge has the remains of a fringe. This vexillum was once attached to a piece of reed wood. It is unknown to which military unit the vexillum belonged; it was found in Egypt shortly before 1911, but its exact provenance remains unclear.

== Appearance ==
It is sometimes reported that the vexillum of the Ancient Roman Republic was red in colour and had the letters SPQR (which means "the Senate and People of Rome") in yellow on it, however "it is difficult to find any evidence that they were ever on military flags carried by the army." This is simply the appearance of the only vexillum discovered so far, and it may not be consistent across other vexilla.

== General and later use ==
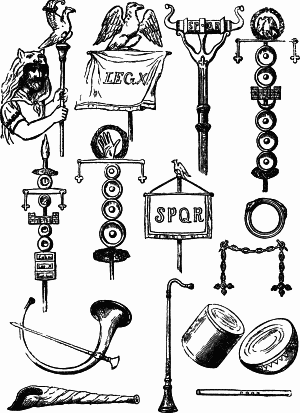
Roman ensigns, standards, trumpets etc.

The term vexillum (plural vexilla) is used more generally for any object, such as a relic or icon, used as a standard in battle, and may be considered the offensive equivalent of the more defensive palladium in this context.

Vexillology, or the study of flags, derives its name from this word and a vexilloid is a standard that is not of conventional flag form.

Nearly all of the present-day regions of Italy preserve the use of vexilla. Many Christian processional banners are in the vexillum form; usually these banners are termed labara (Greek: λάβαρον) after the standard adopted by the first Christian Roman emperor Constantine I replaced the usual spear point with the "Chi-Rho" symbol ☧. For example, a vexillum is used by the Legion of Mary as the term for its standards. A small version is used on the altar and a larger one leads processions. In the Middle Ages, the type of banner draped from a horizontal crossbar became known as a gonfalon.

== See also ==
- Vexilla Regis – early Christian hymn whose first line uses this word, referring to the cross as a standard
- Gonfalon
- Banner
- Vexilloid

=== In taxonomy ===
- Vexillum (botany) – the large upper petal of a papilionaceous flower
- Vexillum (gastropod) – a genus of snails in the family Costellariidae
- Inquisitor vexillum – a sea snail species

== Bibliography ==
- Stoll, Oliver (1995). Excubatio ad signa. Die Wache bei den Fahnen in der römischen Armee und andere Beiträge zur kulturgeschichtlichen und historischen Bedeutung eines militärischen Symbols [Excubatio ad signa. Guard duty at the standards in the Roman army and other contributions to the cultural and historical significance of a military symbol]. St. Katharinen: Scripta-Mercaturae, ISBN 3-89590-009-5.
