= Casadilego =

Italian singer

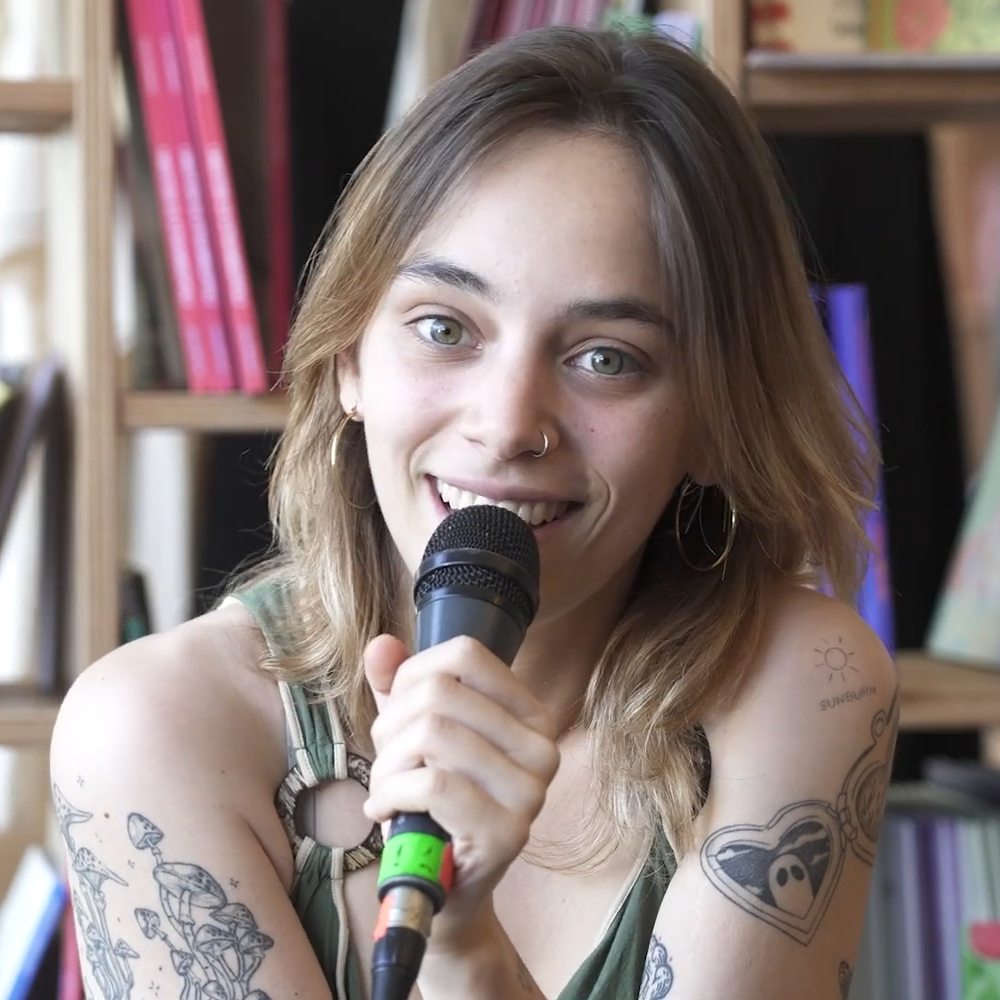
- Casadilego in 2026

Background information
- Born: Elisa Coclite; 22 March 2003 (age 23); Teramo, Abruzzo, Italy
- Origin: Montorio al Vomano, Italy
- Occupations: Singer; songwriter
- Instrument: Vocals
- Years active: 2020–present
- Label: Sony Music

Elisa Coclite (born 22 March 2003), known professionally as Casadilego, is an Italian singer, most known for winning the fourteenth season of the Italian talent show X Factor. Her stage name literally means Lego-House, after Ed Sheeran's song of the same name.

== Early life ==
Elisa Coclite was born in 2003 and grew up in Montorio al Vomano. Her father is the jazz pianist Massimiliano Coclite.

== Career ==
=== 2020–2023: X Factor Italia and career debut ===
Adopting the stage name of Casadilego, after the Ed Sheeran's song of the same name, Coclite took part in the fourteenth season of the Italian X Factor in 2020. She was mentored by Hell Raton and eventually won with her single "Vittoria", co-written by Mara Sattei. During the third live show on 12 November 2020, she also performed her second single entitled "Lontanissimo". On 11 December 2020, one day after the finale, she released her debut EP Casadilego.

Together with Francesco Renga, she performed Ornella Vanoni's "Una ragione di più" during the third evening of the Sanremo Music Festival 2021. On 16 July 2021, she released her first single after X Factor, entitled "Millepiani". On 25 November 2021, Casadilego appeared as a guest during the fifth live show of the fifteenth series of X Factor, performing a duet with Ed Sheeran on Lego House.

In 2022, she starred as the lead in the coming-of-age film My Soul Summer, directed by Fabio Mollo. In 2023, Casadilego was selected to be part of the cast of the Italian version of the rock musical Lazarus, inspired by the music of David Bowie. The production was directed by Valter Malosti, with Manuel Agnelli in the leading role.

=== 2024–present: Silenzio (tutto di me) ===
On 30 August 2024, Casadilego released the single "Posto nuovo", which anticipated her debut studio album. On 20 December 2024, she appeared as a featured artist on "Lacrime di felicità" by Davide Shorty, included on his album Nuova forma.

In 2025, she took a break from recording activities to focus on songwriting, while continuing to perform in Lazarus. Her debut album Silenzio (tutto di me), consisting of nine tracks, was released on 9 January 2026. On 16 January, the track "Verdeforesta" was released as a radio single.

== Discography ==
=== Studio albums ===
List of studio albums, with details and chart positions
Title	Album details	Peak chart positions
Title	Album details	ITA
Silenzio (tutto di me)	Released: 9 January 2026; Label: OTR Live, ADA; Format: Digital download, streaming	—

=== Extended plays ===
List of extended plays, with details and chart positions
Title	EP details	Peak chart positions
Title	EP details	ITA
Casadilego	Released: 11 December 2020; Label: Sony Music; Format: CD, digital download	75

=== Singles ===
List of singles as primary artist, with chart positions, album name and certifications
Single	Year	Peak chart positions	Certifications	Album or EP
Single	Year	ITA	Certifications	Album or EP
"Edinburgh (Attempt no.1)"	2020	—		Non-album single
"Vittoria"	2020	14	FIMI: Gold	Casadilego
"Lontanissimo"	2020	—		Casadilego
"Millepiani"	2021	—		Non-album singles
"Ora o mai più" (with Cicco Sanchez)	2021	—		Non-album singles
"Giardino"	2022	—		Non-album singles
"Oceano di cose perse"	2022	—		Non-album singles
"Posto nuovo"	2024	—		Silenzio (tutto di me)
"Lacrime di felicità" (with Davide Shorty)	2024	—		Nuova forma
"Verdeforesta"	2026	—		Silenzio (tutto di me)
"—" denotes an item that did not chart in that country.

List of singles as featured artist, with release year and album name
Song	Year	Album or EP
"Panino d’idiota" (GattoToro featuring Casadilego)	2025	Non-album single
"Água e Sal/The Woman in Me" (Fabrizio Cammarata featuring Casadilego)	2025	Insularities

=== Guest appearances ===
List of non-single album appearances, with release year and album name
Song	Year	Album or EP
"Mr & Mrs Smith" (Nitro featuring Casadilego)	2021	GarbAge Evilution

== Filmography ==
Film
Year	Title	Role	Notes
2022	My Soul Summer	Anita	Lead role

== Theater ==
Theater
Year	Title	Role	Notes
2023–2025	Lazarus	The Girl	Lead role (Italian version)

== Tournée ==
- 2022 — Casadilego Tour 2022
- 2024 — Casadilego live
- 2025 — Casadilego live 2025
- 2026 — Silenzio (tutto di me) Tour

Opening Act

- 2024 — Il cantastorie recidivo (con Daniele Silvestri)

Awards and achievements
Preceded by Sofia Tornambene	Italian X Factor; Winner; 2020	Succeeded by Baltimora
