= Totem – Episodio uno =

EP by En?gma
- Released: October 16, 2020
- Genre: Alternative hip hop
- Language: Italian
- Producer: Kaizèn

En?gma chronology
Booriana (2019)	Totem – Episodio uno (2020)	Totem – Episodio due (2021)

Singles from Totem – Episodio uno
- 1. "Bomaye" Released: September 26, 2020

Totem – Episodio uno is the first EP of the Totem saga by the Italian rapper En?gma released on October 16, 2020, followed by the second part Totem – Episodio due.

== Description ==
This EP contains 5 tracks, among which "Bomaye", a single from the album and released on September 26 of the same year. The concept of the album is to create a storytelling that hooks from track to track.

== Track listing ==
All tracks are written by Francesco Marcello Scano.

No.	Title	Music	Length
1.	"Bomaye"	Kaizèn	2:29
2.	"Montezuma"		2:28
3.	"Adulterio"		3:31
4.	"Love'n'Bass"		2:56
5.	"Flowontheroad"		3:14
