= The X Factor =

International television franchise

- Created by: Simon Cowell; Syco
- Original work: The X Factor (British TV series)
- Owners: Fremantle; Syco Entertainment
- Years: 2004–present

Films and television
- Television series: The X Factor (independent international versions, see below)

Miscellaneous
- Genre: Music competition
- First aired: 4 September 2004; 22 years ago
- Distributor: Fremantle

The X Factor is a television music competition franchise created by British producer Simon Cowell and his company Syco Entertainment. It originated in the United Kingdom, where it was devised as a replacement for Pop Idol (2001–2003), and has been adapted in various countries. The "X Factor" of the title refers to the undefinable "something" that makes for star quality.

Similar to Got Talent, the franchise maintains a YouTube channel, called X Factor Global. The channel uploads clips of X Factor shows from around the world. The channel currently has over 3 million subscribers. Additionally, many individual X Factor shows have their own YouTube channels such as X Factor Latvia.

== The X Factor around the world ==
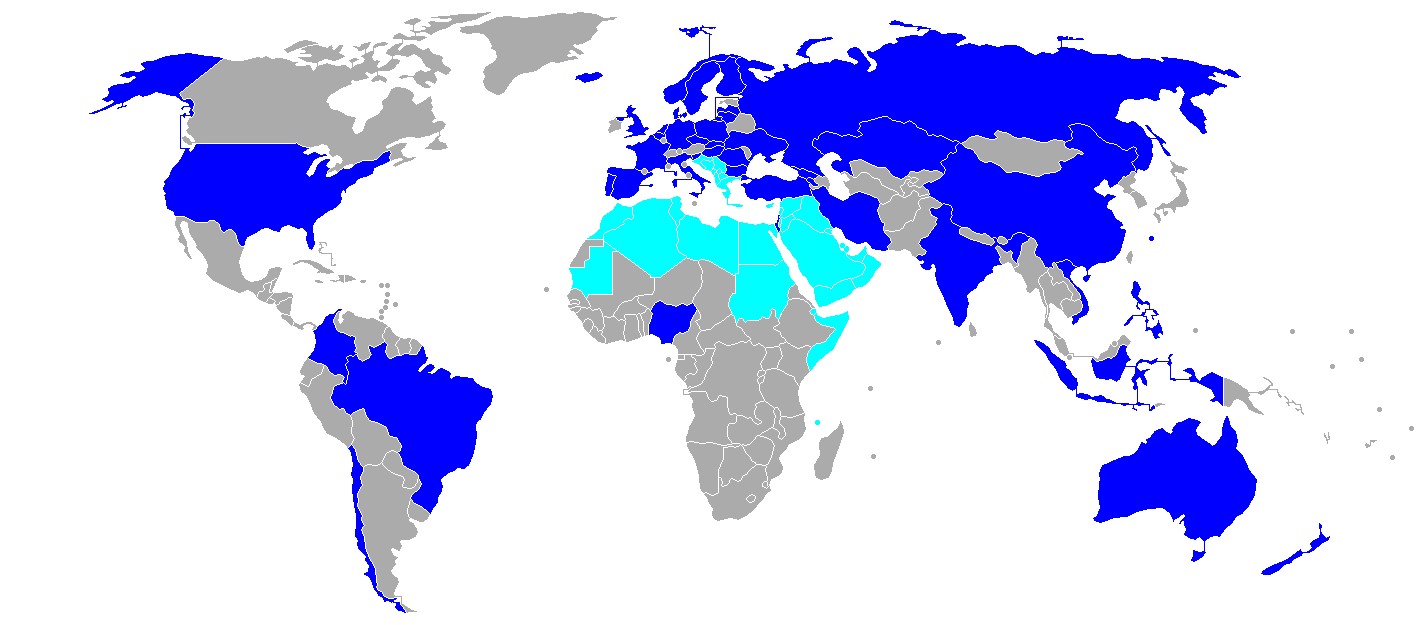
Location of different franchises of The X Factor Own version Joint version Regional version

There have been a total of 256 winners of The X Factor worldwide.

Franchise that is currently airing
Franchise that is not currently airing, but is slated to return in the future
Franchise that has ended
Franchise that was cancelled during production
Franchise whose status is unknown

Country/Region	Local title	Network	Hosts	Judges	Winner
Albania; Kosovo	X Factor	TV Klan	Alketa Vejsiu	Current; Bojken Lako (7–); Fifi (7–); Oriola Marashi (7–); Pirro Çako (7–); Former; Pandi Laço (1–4); Alban Skënderaj (1–4); Vesa Luma (1); Juliana Pasha (1); Altuna Sejdiu (2–3); Miriam Cani (4); Bleona Qereti (4); Adi Krasta (5–6); Arilena Ara (5–6); Young Zerka (5–6); Elhaida Dani (5; judges' houses, 6); Soni Malaj (2–3; live shows, 6)	Season 1, 2012: Sheila Haxhiraj; Season 2, 2012–13: Arilena Ara; Season 3, 2013–14: Ergi Dini; Season 4, 2015: Edea Demaliaj; Season 5, 2023–24: Alis Kallaçi; Season 6, 2024–25: Rigersa Loka; Season 7, 2026–27: Current season
Albania; Kosovo	X Factor Kids	TV Klan	Alketa Vejsiu	Bojken Lako; Fifi; Oriola Marashi; Pirro Çako	Season 1, 2025–26: Eden Dani
Algeria	X Factor El Djazair	Echorouk TV	Racha Mokrane	Cheb Mami; Fella Ababsa; Soolking	Season 1, 2026: Upcoming season
Arab world	The X Factor سير النجاحX	Current; Dubai TV (5–); Former; Rotana (1–2); CBC (3); MBC1 (4)	Current; Sheema (5–); Former; Nathalie Maamary (1); Joelle Rahme (1–2); Yosra El Lozy (3); Bassel Alzaro (3–4); Wael Mansour (4); Daniella Rahme (4)	Current; Ragheb Alama (4–); Rahma Riad (6–); Fayez Al Saeed (6–); Former; Nelly (1); Michel Elefteriades (1–2); Khaled El Sheikh (1–2); Anoushka (2); Carole Samaha (3); Hussain Al Jasmi (3); Wael Kfoury (3); Elissa (3–4); Donia Samir Ghanem (4); Angham (5); Abdallah Al Rowaished (5)	Season 1, 2006: Rajaa Kasabni; Season 2, 2007: Muhammad El Majzoub; Season 3, 2013: Mohammed Rifi; Season 4, 2015: Hamza Hawsawi; Season 5, 2023–24: Haneen Elshater; Season 6, 2024–25: Abdulrahim Al-Halabi; Season 7, TBA: Awaiting Confirmation
Armenia	ԻՔՍ–ՖԱԿՏՈՐ; X–Factor	Shant TV	Aram Mp3 (1–2); Grisha Aghakhanyan (3–4); Avet Barseghyan (3)	Egor Glumov (1, 3); Garik Papoyan (1–4); Gisane Palyan (1–2); Naira Gyurjinyan (1–2); André (2–4); Emmy (3); Erik Karapetyan (4); Shushanik Arevshatyan (4)	Season 1, 2010–11: Vrezh Kirakosyan; Season 2, 2012–13: Kim Grigoryan; Season 3, 2014: Vahé Margaryan; Season 4, 2016–17: Edgar Ghandilyan
Armenia	X Factor Kids	Shant TV	Gohar Gasparyan; Anahit Grigoryan	André; Emmy; Masha	Season 1, 2026: Current season
Australia	The X Factor	Network Ten (1); Seven Network (2–8)	Daniel MacPherson (1); Luke Jacobz (2–7); Jason Dundas (8); Chloe Maxwell (The Xtra Factor, 1); Natalie Garonzi (The Xtra Factor, 2)	Mark Holden (1); Kate Ceberano (1); John Reid (1); Guy Sebastian (2–4, 7–8); Natalie Imbruglia (2); Ronan Keating (2–6); Kyle Sandilands (2); Natalie Bassingthwaighte (3–6); Mel B (3–4, 8); Dannii Minogue (5–7); Redfoo (5–6); James Blunt (7); Chris Isaak (7); Iggy Azalea (8); Adam Lambert (8)	Season 1, 2005: Random; Season 2, 2010: Altiyan Childs; Season 3, 2011: Reece Mastin; Season 4, 2012: Samantha Jade; Season 5, 2013: Dami Im; Season 6, 2014: Marlisa Punzalan; Season 7, 2015: Cyrus Villanueva; Season 8, 2016: Isaiah Firebrace
Balkan countries; Bosnia and Herzegovina; Croatia; Macedonia; Montenegro; Serbia	X Factor Adria	TV Sitel (1–2); Federalna (1–2); RTV Pink (1); RTL Televizija (2); Prva (2); RTRS (2)	Ana Grubin (live shows, 1); Bane Jevtić (Auditions, backstage, 1); Snezana Velkov (Auditions, backstage, 1); Una Senić (X Star, judges' houses, 1); Antonija Blaće (selection process, live shows, 2); Aleksandar Radojičić (selection process, live shows, 2); Nikolina Pišek (backstage, 2)	Željko Joksimović (1–2); Emina Jahović (1); Kiki Lesendrić (1); Kristina Kovač (1); Aleksandra Kovač (2); Massimo Savić^{†} (2); Tonči Huljić (2)	Season 1, 2013–14: Daniel Kajmakoski; Season 2, 2015: Amel Ćurić
Belarus	Current; Factor BY (2–); Former; X Factor Belarus (1)	Belteleradiocompany	Vladimir Bogdan; Marianna Murenkova	Current; Olga Buzova; Denis Klyaver (4–); Stanislav Yarushin (4–); Vladimir Gromov (4–); Former; Sergey Sosedov^{†} (1–2); Ruslan Alekhno (1–3); Seryoga (1–3); Yosyf Pryhozhyn (3)	2020: Cancelled (Note: X Factor Belarus was planned to start in 2020 with a final on 31 December 2020. After completed pre-auditions in Hrodna, Mahilyow and Homiel, the production team behind X Factor Belarus had to cancel the auditions in Vitebsk in early April because of local COVID-19 pandemic regulations. On 4 April, the production team cancelled all further auditions and later announced there would be no more auditions until late May. In July 2020, the Instagram account of X Factor Belarus asked auditionees for patience. Since then, any update on the future of the show lacks.); Season 1, 2021: Andrey Panisov (Note: X Factor Belarus was planned to start in 2020 with a final on 31 December 2020. After failing to produce the show in 2020, the official X Factor Belarus Instagram account announced the show would return for a new audition round in March 2021. The proposed date for the final was again set for New Year's Eve.); Season 2, 2022–23: Ivan Dyatlov; Season 3, 2023–24: Danyil Savenia; Season 4, 2024–25: Vitaliy Bogdanov; Season 5, 2025–26: Ibragim Karasov; Season 6, 2026–27: Current season
Belarus	Factor BY: Children	Belteleradiocompany	Sergey Minaev; Elena Meraai	Nkeeei; Anastasia Kravchenko; Alexey Vorobyov; Zara	Season 1, 2026: Vlad Tabola
Belgium	X Factor	vtm	Koen Wauters (1); Hadise (2)	Kris Wauters (1–2); Jean Blaute (1); Liliane Saint-Pierre (1); Maurice Engelen (2); Do (2)	Season 1, 2005: Udo Mechels; Season 2, 2008: Dirk De Smet
Bolivia	Factor X Bolivia	Red Uno	Carlos Rocabado; Ximena Zalzer	Ángel López (1); Andrés Barba (1–2); Mayra Gonzales (1–2); Matamba (2); Chris Syler (1–2)	Season 1, 2018: Juan Lovera; Season 2, 2019: DÚO MÍA
Brazil	X Factor	Band; Website; TNT	Fernanda Paes Leme (X Factor); Maurício Meirelles (Pré-Factor)	Rick Bonadio; Alinne Rosa; Di Ferrero; Paulo Miklos	Season 1, 2016: Cristopher Clark
Bulgaria	X Factor	Nova TV; Website	Deo (1); Maria Ignatova (2–5); Alexandra Raeva (2–5)	Maga (1); Maria Ilieva (1–3); Poli Genova (1); Vasko Vasilev (1); Lubo Kirov (2–3, 5); Sanya Armutlieva (2–5); Zaki (2–3, 5); Krisko (4–5); Lucy Diakovska (4); Magarditch Halvadjian (4)	Season 1, 2011: Raffi Boghosyan; Season 2, 2013: Zhana Bergendorff; Season 3, 2014–15: Slavin Slavchev; Season 4, 2015–16: Christiana Louizu; Season 5, 2017: 4 Magic
Cambodia	X Factor Cambodia	Hangmeas; Website	Chea Vibol; Chan Keonimol	Aok Sokunkanha; Khemarak Sereymun; Nop Bayyareth; Sok Seylalin	Season 1, 2019: Chan Sopanha
Chile	Factor X	TVN; Website	Julián Elfenbein	Tito Beltrán (1–2); Karen Doggenweiler (1–2); Zeta Bosio (1); Mon Laferte (2); José Luis Rodríguez (2)	Season 1, 2011: Sergio Járlaz; Season 2, 2012: Juan Gabriel Valenzuela
China	The X Factor: Ji Qing Chang Xiang The X Factor 激情唱响; The X Factor: Passionate Singer (1); The X Factor: 中国最强音; The X Factor: China's Strongest Voice (2)	Liaoning TV (1); HBS:Hunan TV (2)	Da Zuo (1); Shao Wenjie (1); Zhu Dan (2); He Jiong (2)	Angie Chai Chih–ping (1); Aduo (1); Chen Ming (1); Chen Yufan (1); Eason Chan Yik–shun (2); Lo Ta-yu (2); Zheng Jun (2); Zhang Ziyi (3)	Season 1, 2011: Li Shangshang; Season 2, 2012: Chen Yumeng
Colombia	El Factor X The X Factor	RCN TV; Website	Andrea Serna (1–3); Karen Martínez (4); Mauricio Vélez (4); Laura González (5–)	Current; José Gaviria; Rosana (4–); Piso 21 (4–); Carolina Gaitán (5–); Former; Marbelle (1–3); Juan Carlos Coronel (1–3)	Season 1, 2005: Julio César Meza; Season 2, 2006: Francisco Villarreal; Season 3, 2009: Siam; Season 4, 2021: Madeiro (José David Madero); Season 5, 2022: Heyner Usprung; Season 6, TBA: Awaiting Confirmation
Colombia	El Factor X: Batalla de las Estrellas; The X Factor: Battle of the Stars	RCN TV; Website	Andrea Serna	Marbelle; José Gaviria; Juan Carlos Coronel	Season 1, 2006: Luz Amparo Álvarez
Colombia	El Factor Xs	RCN TV; Website	Andrea Serna	Marbelle; José Gaviria; Juan Carlos Coronel (1, 3); Wilfrido Vargas (2)	Season 1, 2006: Andres Camilo Hurtado; Season 2, 2007: Camilo Echeverry Correa; Season 3, 2011: Shaira Selena Peláez
Colombia	El Factor X Familia	RCN TV; Website	Andrea Serna	Marbelle; José Gaviria; Juan Carlos Coronel; Reykon	Season 1, 2015: Dúo Herencia
Czech Republic	X Factor	TV Nova; Website	Leoš Mareš	Gabriela Osvaldová; Ondřej Soukup; Petr Janda	Season 1, 2008: Jiří Zonyga
Czech Republic; Slovakia	X Factor	Prima family Website; TV JOJ; Website	Martin Rausch	Celeste Buckingham; Ondřej Brzobohatý; Sisa Sklovská; Oto Klempíř	Season 1, 2014: Peter Bažík
Denmark	X Factor	Current; TV 2 (12–); Former; DR (1–11)	Current; Maria Fantino (17–); Former; Lise Rønne (1–2, 4–5, 14 Live Shows); Signe Muusman (3); Signe Molde (6); Eva Harlou (7–8); Sofie Linde Ingversen (9–16); Joakim Ingversen (11 from 1st to 2nd live shows); Melvin Kakooza (14 Bootcamp); Emil Thorup (Xtra Factor, 6); Thomas Skov (X Factor Backstage, 8); Joakim Ingversen (Ultra Factor, 9–11); Jacob Riising (Ultra Factor, 11); Rasmus Brohave (Z Factor, 12)	Current; Thomas Blachman (1–2, 4–); Drew Sycamore (19–); Benjamin Hav (19–); Former; Lina Rafn (1–2, 7–8); Remee (1–3, 7–11); Soulshock (3); Pernille Rosendahl (3–5); Cutfather (4–5); Ida Corr (6); Anne Linnet (6); Mette Lindberg (9–10); Sanne Salomonsen (11); Oh Land (12–14, 17–18); Ankerstjerne (12–13); Martin Jensen (14–15); Kwamie Liv (15–16); Simon Kvamm (16–18)	Season 1, 2008: Martin Hoberg Hedegaard; Season 2, 2009: Linda Andrews; Season 3, 2010: Thomas Ring Petersen; Season 4, 2011: Sarah Skaalum Jørgensen; Season 5, 2012: Ida Østergaard Madsen; Season 6, 2012–13: Chresten Falck Damborg; Season 7, 2014: Anthony Jasmin; Season 8, 2015: Emilie Esther; Season 9, 2016: Embrace; Season 10, 2016–17: Morten Nørgaard; Season 11, 2018: Place on Earth; Season 12, 2019: Kristian Kjærlund; Season 13, 2020: Alma Agger; Season 14, 2021: Solveig Lindelof; Season 15, 2022: Mads Moldt; Season 16, 2023: ROSÉL; Season 17, 2024: Helene Frank; Season 18, 2024–25: Leslie Nguyen; Season 19, 2026: Hugo Almeida; Season 20, 2027: Upcoming Season
Ecuador	Factor X Kids Ecuador	Ecuavisa	Ursula Strenge	Jorge Luis del Hierro (1); Pamela Cortéz (1); Maykel Cedeño (1)	Season 1, 2015: Celena Rosero
Finland	X Factor	MTV3	Heikki Paasonen (1); Ile Uusivuori (2); Viivi Pumpanen (2); Jukka Rossi (Xtra Factor, 1)	Linda Brava (1); Renne Korppila (1); Gugi Kokljuschkin (1); Saara Aalto (2); Michael Monroe (2); Mikael Gabriel (2); Suvi Teräsniska (2)	Season 1, 2010: Elias Hämäläinen; Season 2, 2018: Tika Liljegren
France	X Factor	W9 (1); M6 (2); RTL–TVI	Alexandre Devoise (1); Sandrine Corman (2); Jérôme Anthony (F@n Factor, 2)	Marc Cerrone (1); Julie Zenatti (1); Alain Lanty (1); Henry Padovani (2); Olivier Schultheis (2); Véronic DiCaire (2); Christophe Willem (2)	Season 1, 2009: Sébastien Agius; Season 2, 2011: Matthew Raymond-Barker
Georgia	X Factor Georgia; X ფაქტორი	Rustavi 2 (1–4); Imedi TV (5)	Gega Palavandishvili (1); la Sukhitashvili (1); Giorgi Kipshidze (2); Ruska Makashvili (3–5); Erekle Getsadze (3); Vaniko Tarkhnishvili (4–5)	Giorgi Gabunia (1–4); Tamta (1–2, 5); Sopho Toroshelidze (1); Stephane Mgebrishvili (1, 4–5); Sofia Nizharadze (2–4); Anri Jokhadze (2, 5); Nina Sublatti (3); Nika Gvaramia (3); Dato Porchkhidze (3); Lela Tsurtsumia (4); Naniko Khazaradze (5); Dato Evgenidze (5)	Season 1, 2014: Tornike Kipiani; Season 2, 2015: Giorgi Nakashidze; Season 3, 2016: Avto Abeslamidze; Season 4, 2017: Sandro Kurcxalidze; Season 5, 2018: Anri Guchmanidze
Germany	X Factor	VOX (1–3); Sky 1 (4)	Jochen Schropp (1–3); Charlotte Würdig (4); Bence Istenes (4); Janin Reinhardt (backstage, 2)	Sarah Connor (1–3); Till Brönner (1–2); George Glueck (1); Das Bo (2); Sandra Nasic (3); HP Baxxter (3); Moses Pelham (3); Sido (4); Iggy Uriarte (4); Jennifer Rostock (4); Thomas Anders (4)	Season 1, 2010: Edita Abdieski; Season 2, 2011: David Pfeffer; Season 3, 2012: Mrs. Greenbird; Season 4, 2018: EES & The Yes-Ja! Band
Greece; Cyprus	The X Factor	ANT1 (1–3); Skai TV (4–5); Sigma TV (4–5); Open TV (6); Omega (6); Mega TV (7); Alpha TV Cyprus (7)	Sakis Rouvas (1–5); Despina Vandi (6); Giorgos Lianos (auditions, 1–3); Despina Kampouri (auditions, 1–2); Maria Sinatsaki (auditions, 3); Evangelia Aravani (backstage, 4–5); Aris Makris (backstage, 6); Andreas Georgiou (7); Ilias Bogdanos (backstage, 7); Katerina Lioliou (backstage, 7)	Giorgos Theofanous (1–4, 6); George Levendis (1–3); Katerina Gagaki (1–3); Nikos Mouratidis (1–3); Tamta (4–5); Peggy Zina (4); Thodoris Marantinis (4); Giorgos Papadopoulos (5); Babis Stokas (5); Giorgos Mazonakis† (5); Melina Aslanidou (6); Michael Tsaousopoulos (6); Christos Mastoras (6–7); Mariza Rizou (7); Michalis Kouinelis (7); Stelios Rokkos (7)	Season 1, 2008–09: Loukas Giorkas; Season 2, 2009–10: Stavros Michalakakos; Season 3, 2010–11: Haris Antoniou; Season 4, 2016: Andreas Leontas; Season 5, 2017: Panagiotis Koufogiannis; Season 6, 2019: Giannis Grosis; Season 7, 2022: Katerina Lazaridou
Hungary	X-Faktor	RTL; Website	Current; Babett Köllő (14–); Márk Ember (14–); Former; Nóra Ördög (1–3); Balázs Sebestyén (1); Lilu (4); Bence Istenes (4–6); Ramóna Kiss (7–9); Dávid Miller (10–13); Joci Pápai (12–13); Dóra Kovács (backstage, 6); Alexandra Koholák (backstage, 7); Zsófi Szabó (backstage, 8–9)	Current; Laci Gáspár (6–); ByeAlex (6–11,14–); Péter Majoros (12–); Solére (14–); Former; Peti Puskás (6–11); Erika Herceg (11); Péter Geszti (1–4); Ildikó Keresztes (1–3); Miklós Malek (1–3); Feró Nagy (1–3); Róbert Alföldi (4–5); Róbert Szikora (4–5); Gabi Tóth (4–6); Little G Weevil (5); Gigi Radics (7–8); Bogi Dallos (9); Adél Csobot (10); Andrea Tóth (12–13); Milán Valkusz (12–13)	Season 1, 2010: Csaba Vastag; Season 2, 2011: Tibor Kocsis; Season 3, 2012: Gergő Oláh; Season 4, 2013: Dóra Danics; Season 5, 2014: Andi Tóth; Season 6, 2016: Barbara Opitz; Season 7, 2017: Ricco & Claudia; Season 8, 2018: USNK; Season 9, 2019: Tibor Ruszó; Season 10, 2021: ALEE; Season 11, 2022: Bernadett Solyom; Season 12, 2024: Krisztián Fehér; Season 13, 2025: Belano; Season 14, 2026: Current season
Iceland	X Factor	Stöð 2 Website	Halla Vilhjálmsdóttir (1)	Einar Bárðarson (1); Elínborg Halldórsdóttir (1); Páll Óskar Hjálmtýsson (1)	Season 1, 2006–07: Jógvan Hansen
India	X Factor India	Sony Entertainment TV; Website	Aditya Narayan	Sonu Nigam; Shreya Ghoshal; Sanjay Leela Bhansali	Season 1, 2011: Geet Sagar
Indonesia	X Factor Indonesia	RCTI; Website	Robby Purba	Judika (3–4); Marcello Tahitoe (4); Bunga Citra Lestari (3–4); Ariel "Noah" (3–4); Vidi Aldiano^{†} (4); Anggun (1); Ahmad Dhani (1–2); Bebi Romeo (1–2); Rossa (1–3); Afgan (2); Anang Hermansyah (3)	Season 1, 2012–13: Fatin Shidqia; Season 2, 2015: Jebe & Petty; Season 3, 2021–22: Alvin Jonathan; Season 4, 2023–24: Peter Holly
Iran	Stage	Manoto	Raha Etemadi	Shahram Azar; Hamed Nikpay; Babak Saeedi; Reza Rohani	Season 1, 2016: Amirhossein Eftekhari; Season 2, 2017: Alireza Saremi
Israel	The X Factor ישראל; The X Factor Israel	Channel 2 (1–2); Reshet (1–2); Reshet 13 (3–4); Website	Current; Liron Weizman (4-); Former; Bar Refaeli (1-3)	Current; Simon Cowell (5–); Jason Ritter (5–); Kristen Schaal (5–); Ran Danker (4–); Aviv Geffen (4–); Former; Moshe Peretz (1–3); Ivri Lider (1–3); Rami Fortis (1–2); Shiri Maimon (1–3); Subliminal (3); Netta Barzilai (4); Margol (4); Miri Mesika (4)	Season 1, 2013–14: Rose Fostanes; Season 2, 2015: Daniel Yafe; Season 3, 2017–18: Eden Alene; Season 4, 2021–22: Michael Ben David; Season 5, 2026: Upcoming Season
Italy	X Factor	Current; Sky Uno (5–); TV8 (9–); Website; Former; Rai 2 (1–4)	Current; Giorgia (18–); Former; Francesca Michielin (16-17); Ludovico Tersigni (15); Alessandro Cattelan (5–14); Francesco Facchinetti (1–4; Xtra Factor, 4); Alessandra Barzaghi (Xtra Factor, 4); Max Novaresi (Xtra Factor, 5–6); Brenda Lodigiani (Xtra Factor, 5–6); Matteo Bordone (Xtra Factor, 7–8); Mara Maionchi (Xtra Factor, 8–11); Aurora Ramazzotti (X Factor daily, 9–11); Daniela Collu (Xtra Factor, 9–13)	Current; Paola Iezzi (18–); Jake La Furia (18–); Francesco Gabbani (19–); Irama (20–); Former; Morgan (1–3, 5–8, 17); Mara Maionchi (1–4, 11–13); Simona Ventura (1–2, 5–7); Claudia Mori (3); Anna Tatangelo (4); Enrico Ruggeri (4); Elio (4–7, 9); Arisa (5–6, 10); Mika (7–9, 14–15); Victoria Cabello (8); Skin (9); Álvaro Soler (10); Levante (11); Asia Argento (12); Samuel (13); Malika Ayane (13); Sfera Ebbasta (13); Emma Marrone (14–15); Hell Raton (14–15); Rkomi (16); Fedez (8–12, 16–17); Ambra Angiolini (16–17); Dargen D'Amico (16–17); Manuel Agnelli (10-12, 14-15, 18); Achille Lauro (18–19)	Season 1, 2008: Aram Quartet; Season 2, 2008–09: Matteo Becucci; Season 3, 2009: Marco Mengoni; Season 4, 2010: Nathalie; Season 5, 2011: Francesca Michielin; Season 6, 2012: Chiara Galiazzo; Season 7, 2013: Michele Bravi; Season 8, 2014: Lorenzo Fragola; Season 9, 2015: Giosada; Season 10, 2016: Soul System; Season 11, 2017: Lorenzo Licitra; Season 12, 2018: Anastasio; Season 13, 2019: Sofia Tornambene; Season 14, 2020: Casadilego; Season 15, 2021: Baltimora; Season 16, 2022: Santi Francesi; Season 17, 2023: Sarafine; Season 18, 2024: Mimi Caruso; Season 19, 2025: Rob; Season 20, 2026: Current season
Japan	X Factor Okinawa Japan	Okinawa TV; Website	Jon Kabira; Naomi Watanabe	Kaz Utsunomiya; Rino Nakasone; Kiyoshi Matsuo	Season 1, 2013–14: Sky's the Limit
Kazakhstan	X Factor	Perviy Kanal Evraziya; Website	Current; Arnur Istybaev (2–6, 9 -); Former; Adil Liyan (1); Daniyar Dzumadilov (7–8)	Current; Nurbergen Makhambetov (5 from live–); Eva Becher (6, 9-); Dilnaz Akhmadieva (4–5, until live, 7, 9 -); Former; Nagima Eskalieva (1-8); Alexander Shevchenko (1–5); Sultana Karazhigitova (1–2, until live); Ismail Igіlmanov (2, from live); Erlan Kokeev (3); Anatoliy Tsoy (8)	Season 1, 2011: Dariya Gabdull; Season 2, 2012: Andrey Tikhonov; Season 3, 2013: Evgeniya Barysheva; Season 4, 2013: Kairat Kapanov; Season 5, 2014: Evgeny Vyblov; Season 6, 2015: Astana Kargabay; Season 7, 2018: Dilnura Birzhanova; Season 8, 2020–21: Bro; Season 9, 2022–23: Miras Erbolov; Season 10, 2023–24: Ulpan Zumabek; Season 11, TBA: Awaiting Confirmation
Latvia	X Faktors	TV3; Website	Markus Riva	Reinis Sējāns; Aija Auškāpa; Intars Busulis; Marats Ogļezņevs (3–)	Season 1, 2017: Artūrs Gruzdiņš; Season 2, 2018: Kattie; Season 3, 2019: Elīna Gluzunova; Season 4, 2021: Grēta Grantiņa; Season 5, 2023: Emilija Bērziņa; Season 6, 2025: Jurģis Namejs Zvejnieks
Lithuania	X Faktorius	TV3	Current; Mindaugas Stasiulis (5–); Mindaugas Rainys (5–); Former; Marijonas Mikutavičius (1); Martynas Starkus (2–4)	Current; Saulius Prūsaitis; Saulius Urbonavičius; Marijonas Mikutavičius (2–); Justina Arlauskaitė-Jazzu (3–); Former; Vytautas Šapranauskas (1); Rūta Ščiogolevaitė (1–2); Andrius Mamontovas (5, 7 (Note: As a one-off judge replacing Prūsaitis))	Season 1, 2012–13: Giedrė Vokietytė; Season 2, 2013–14: Žygimantas Gečas; Season 3, 2015–16: Monika Pundziūtė; Season 4, 2016–17: Iglė Bernotaitytė; Season 5, 2017–18: 120; Season 6, 2018–19: Good Time Boys; Season 7, 2019: Milda Martinkėnaitė; Season 8, 2021: Mando; Season 9, 2022: Spurr; Season 10, 2024: Atėnė Ravinkaitė
Lithuania	X Faktorius. Žvaigždės; X Factor. Stars	TV3	Mindaugas Stasiulis; Mindaugas Rainys	Saulius Prūsaitis; Saulius Urbonavičius; Marijonas Mikutavičius; Justina Arlauskaitė-Jazzu	Season 1, 2020: Milita Daikerytė
Malta	X Factor Malta	TVM	Current; Gianni Zammit (4–); Former; Ben Camille (1–3)	Current; Howard Keith Debono; Philippa Naudi (3, 5-); Amber Bondin (4–); Aleandro Spiteri Monsigneur (5–); Former; Ray Mercieca (1–2); Alexandra Alden (1–2); Ivan Grech (3); Ira Losco (1-4); Gianluca Bezzina (4)	Season 1, 2018–19: Michela Pace; Season 2, 2019–20: Destiny Chukunyere; Season 3, 2021–22: Ryan Hili; Season 4, 2023–24: Richard Aquilina; Season 5, 2026: Lisa Gauci
Myanmar	The X Factor Myanmar	MRTV 4	Zaw Htet (1); Hmu Thiha Thu (2)	Si Thu Lwin (1–2); Nge Nge (1–2); Eaint Chit (1); Za War (1–2); Zam Nuu (2)	Season 1, 2016: Htun Naung Sint; Season 2, 2017: David Derrick
Netherlands	X Factor	RTL 4 Website	Wendy van Dijk (1–4); Martijn Krabbe (2–5); Nathalie Bulters (Backstage, 3); Eva Treurniet (Backstage, 3); Lieke van Lexmond (Backstage, 4); Ferry Doedens (Backstage, 5)	Henkjan Smits (1); Marianne van Wijnkoop (1); Henk Temming (1); Eric van Tijn (2–4); Stacey Rookhuizen (2–4); Angela Groothuizen (2–5); Gordon Heuckeroth (2–5); Ali Bouali (5); Candy Dulfer (5)	Season 1, 2007: Sharon Kips; Season 2, 2009: Lisa Hordijk; Season 3, 2010: Jaap Reesema; Season 4, 2011: Rochelle Perts; Season 5, 2013: Haris Alagic
New Zealand	The X Factor	TV3; Website	Dominic Bowden; Guy Williams (The Xtra Factor, 2); Sharyn Casey (The Xtra Factor, 2); Clint Roberts (The Xtra Factor, 2); Caito Potatoe aka Caitlin Davidson (The X Factor RAW, 2)	Daniel Bedingfield (1); Ruby Frost (1); Stan Walker (1–2); Melanie Blatt (1–2); Natalia Kills (2); Willy Moon (2)	Season 1, 2013: Jackie Thomas; Season 2, 2015: Beau Monga
Norway	X Factor	TV 2	Charlotte Thorstvedt (1); Ravi (2); Guri Solberg (2); Peter Moi Brubresko (Xtra Factor); Katarina Flatland (Xtra Factor)	Jan Fredrik Karlsen; Mira Craig (1); Peter Peters (1); Elisabeth Andreassen (2); Marion Ravn (2); Klaus Sonstad (2)	Season 1, 2009: Chand Torsvik; Season 2, 2010: Hans Bollandsås
Philippines	The X Factor Philippines	ABS–CBN	KC Concepcion	Martin Nievera; Gary Valenciano; Pilita Corrales†; Jake Zyrus	Season 1, 2012: KZ Tandingan
Poland	X Factor	TVN; Website	Jarosław Kuźniar (1–2); Patricia Kazadi (3–4)	Czesław Mozil (1–4); Maja Sablewska (1); Kuba Wojewódzki (1–4); Tatiana Okupnik (2–4); Ewa Farna (4)	Season 1, 2011: Gienek Loska; Season 2, 2012: Dawid Podsiadło; Season 3, 2013: Klaudia Gawor; Season 4, 2014: Artem Furman
Portugal	Factor X	SIC	João Manzarra (1–2); Bárbara Guimarães (1); Cláudia Vieira (2); Carolina Torres (Factor Extra) (1–2); Tiago Silva (Factor F)	Sónia Tavares (1–2); Paulo Junqueiro (1–2); Paulo Ventura (1–2); Miguel Guedes (2)	Season 1, 2013–14: Berg; Season 2, 2014: Kika Kardoso
Romania	X Factor România; The X Factor Romania	Antena 1 Website	Current; Mihai Morar (11–); Former; Mihai Bendeac (8); Vlad Drăgulin (8); Răzvan Simion (1–7, 9–10); Dani Oțil (1–7, 9–10)	Current; Marius Moga (11–); Puya (11–); Delia Matache (2–); Ștefan Bănică Jr. (4–); Former; Adrian Sînă (1); Paula Seling (1); Mihai Morar (1); Dan Bittman (2–3); Cheloo (2–3); Horia Brenciu (4–8); Carla's Dreams (6–8); Loredana Groza (9–10); Florin Ristei (9–10)	Season 1, 2011–12: Andrei Leonte; Season 2, 2012: Tudor Turcu; Season 3, 2013: Florin Ristei; Season 4, 2014: Adina Răducan; Season 5, 2015: Florin Răduţă; Season 6, 2016: Olga Verbiţchi; Season 7, 2017: Jeremy Ragsdale; Season 8, 2018: Bella Santiago; Season 9, 2020: Andrada Precup; Season 10, 2021: Nick Casciaro; Season 11, 2025: George Radu
Russia	Секрет успеха Secret of Success (1–2); Фактор А The A Factor (3–5); Главная сцена The Main Stage (6–7)	RTR (1–2); Website; Russia 1 (3–7)	Aleksey Chumakov (1, 4); Elena Vorobey (1); Tutta Larsen (2); Philipp Kirkorov (3–5); Volodymyr Zelenskyy (3); Grigory Leps (6); Garik Martirosyan (6); Nargiz Zakirova (7); Marina Kravets (7); Ernest Mackevičius (7)	Valeriy Meladze (1); Aleksandr Revzin (1); Katerina Von Gechmen–Valdek (1); Valeriya (2); Tigran Keosayan (2); Valery Garkalin (2); Roman Emelyanov (3–5); Boris Krasnov (3); Lolita Milyavskaya (3–5); Igor Nikolayev (4–5); Alla Pugacheva (chairperson, 3–5); Walter Afanasieff (6); Zhanna Rozhdestvenskaya (6); Yuri Antonov (6); Sergey Chigrakov (6); Valery Leontiev (7); Diana Arbenina (7); Elena Vaenga (7); Vladimir Presnyakov (7); Nikolai Noskov (7, only auditions); Judges-producer; Walter Afanasieff (6); Konstantin Meladze (6); Maxim Fadeev (6); Igor Matvienko (6); Viktor Drobysh (6)	Season 1, 2005: Vladimir Sapovsky; Season 2, 2007: Nikolay Timokhin; Season 3, 2011: Sergei Savin; Season 4, 2012: Alexey Sulima; Season 5, 2013: Mali; Season 6, 2015: Sardor Milano; Season 7, 2015–16: Arseny Borodin
Slovenia	X Faktor	POP TV	Peter Poles; Vid Valič	Damjan Damjanovič; Jadranka Juras; Aleš Uranjek	Season 1, 2012: Demetra Malalan
South Africa	The X Factor SA	SABC 1 Website	Andile Ncube	Arno Carstens; Oskido; Zonke	Season 1, 2015: FOUR
Spain	Factor X	Cuatro (1–2); Telecinco (3–)	Current; Ion Aramendi (4–); Former; Nuria Roca (1–2); Jesús Vázquez (3); Xtra Factor; Nando Escribano (3)	Current; Abraham Mateo (4–); Lali Espósito (4–); Vanesa Martín (4–); Willy Bárcenas (4–); Former; Miqui Puig (1–2); Jorge Flo (1–2); Eva Perales (1–2); Laura Pausini (3); Risto Mejide (3); Xavi Martínez (3); Fernando Montesinos (3)	Season 1, 2007: María Villalón; Season 2, 2008: Vocal Tempo; Season 3, 2018: Pol Granch; Season 4, 2024: Aye Alfonso; Season 5, TBA: Awaiting Confirmation
Sweden	X Factor	TV4	David Hellenius	Andreas Carlsson; Marie Serneholt; Orup; Ison Glasgow	Season 1, 2012: Awa Santesson-Sey
Thailand	The X Factor Thailand	Workpoint TV	Krit Sripoomseth	Nitipong Honark; Jennifer Kim; Saksit Vejsupaporn; Chalatit Tantiwut	Season 1, 2017: Slow
Turkey	X Factor: Star Işığı	Kanal D Website	Kadir Doğulu (1a); Bülent Şakrak (1b)	Ziynet Sali (1a); Emre Aydın (1a); Ömer Karacan (1a); Armağan Çağlayan (1a); Nigar Jamal (1b); Sinan Akçıl (1b); Atiye (1b); Nihat Odabaşı (1b)	Season 1, 2014: Cancelled
Ukraine	The X Factor	STB; Website	Oksana Marchenko (1–7); Andriy Bednyakov (7–9); Daria Trehubova (10)	Ihor Kondratyuk (1–6, 10); Sergey Sosedov^{†} (1–6); Seryoga (1–4); Yolka (1–2); Irina Dubtsova (3–4); Ivan Dorn (5); Nino Katamadze (5–6); Andriy Khlyvniuk (6); Andriy Danylko (7–10); Kostiantyn Meladze (7); Julia Sanina (7); Anton Savlepov (7); Anastasiya Kamenskykh (8–10); Oleh Vynnyk (8–9); Dmytro Shurov (8–9); Olya Polyakova (10)	Season 1, 2010–11: Olexiy Kuznetsov; Season 2, 2011–12: Viktor Romanchenko; Season 3, 2012–13: Aida Nikolaychuk; Season 4, 2013–14: Oleksandr Poriadynsky; Season 5, 2014: Dmytro Babak; Season 6, 2015: Kostyantyn Bocharov; Season 7, 2016: Sevak Khanagyan; Season 8, 2017: Misha Panchishyn; Season 9, 2018: ZBSband; Season 10, 2019: Elina Ivashchenko
United Kingdom (Original) (Note: Also shown in Republic of Ireland and in series 3, 4, 7 and 13 auditions were held in Dublin, and viewers in Ireland were allowed to vote. The British version of The X Factor is also shown in Malta on channel TVM.)	The X Factor	ITV	Kate Thornton (1–3); Dermot O'Leary (4–11, 13–15); Caroline Flack (12); Olly Murs (12); Digital; Roman Kemp (13); Becca Dudley (14–15); Tinea Taylor (15); The Xtra Factor; Ben Shephard (1–3); Fearne Cotton (4); Holly Willoughby (5–6); Konnie Huq (7); Caroline Flack (8–10); Olly Murs (8–9); Matt Richardson (10); Sarah-Jane Crawford (11); Rochelle Humes (12); Melvin Odoom (12); Rylan Clark-Neal (13); Matt Edmondson (13)	Simon Cowell (1–7, 11–15); Louis Walsh (1–11, 13–14); Sharon Osbourne (1–4, 10, 13–14); Dannii Minogue (4–7); Cheryl (5–7, 11–12); Gary Barlow (8–10); Tulisa (8–9); Kelly Rowland (8); Nicole Scherzinger (9–10, 13–14); Mel B (11); Rita Ora (12); Nick Grimshaw (12); Ayda Field (15); Louis Tomlinson (15); Robbie Williams (15)	Series 1, 2004: Steve Brookstein; Series 2, 2005: Shayne Ward; Series 3, 2006: Leona Lewis; Series 4, 2007: Leon Jackson; Series 5, 2008: Alexandra Burke; Series 6, 2009: Joe McElderry; Series 7, 2010: Matt Cardle; Series 8, 2011: Little Mix; Series 9, 2012: James Arthur; Series 10, 2013: Sam Bailey; Series 11, 2014: Ben Haenow; Series 12, 2015: Louisa Johnson; Series 13, 2016: Matt Terry; Series 14, 2017: Rak-Su; Series 15, 2018: Dalton Harris
United Kingdom (Original)	The X Factor: Battle of the Stars	ITV	Kate Thornton	Louis Walsh; Sharon Osbourne; Simon Cowell	Series 1, 2006: Lucy Benjamin
United Kingdom (Original)	The X Factor: Celebrity	ITV	Dermot O'Leary	Louis Walsh; Nicole Scherzinger; Simon Cowell	Series 1, 2019: Megan McKenna
United Kingdom (Original)	The X Factor: The Band	ITV	Dermot O'Leary	Leona Lewis; Nicole Scherzinger; Simon Cowell	Series 1, 2019: Real Like You
United States	The X Factor	Fox	Steve Jones (1); Khloé Kardashian (2); Mario Lopez (2–3)	Simon Cowell; L.A. Reid (1–2); Paula Abdul (1); Nicole Scherzinger (1); Britney Spears (2); Demi Lovato (2–3); Kelly Rowland (3); Paulina Rubio (3)	Season 1, 2011: Melanie Amaro; Season 2, 2012: Tate Stevens; Season 3, 2013: Alex & Sierra
United States	El Factor X The X Factor (Spanish Kids version)	MundoFox	Poncho de Anda (1)	Belinda (1); Angélica María (1); Chyno Miranda (1); Nacho (1)	Season 1, 2013: Los Tres Charritos
Uzbekistan	X-Faktor Oʻzbekiston	FTV	Current; Oyxon Abdulakimova (3–) Former; Nilufar Sotiboldiyeva (1–2 ); Aziz Gulyamov (3, until live)	Current; Shakhriyor Argonov (2–); Lola Ahmedova (4–); Asal Shodiyeva (4–); Ravshan Sobirov (4–); Former; Ibrohim Ahmedov (1–2; 3 until live); Jasmin (1, 3); Lola (1–2 ); Munisa Rizayeva (2–3 ); Ravshan Komilov (1); Shohjahon Juraev (3, from live)	Season 1, 2023: Javlon Sapoyev; Season 2, 2024: Rishad Band; Season 3, 2025: Abdurahim Abdukarimov; Season 4, 2026: Current season
Vietnam	The X Factor Vietnam; Nhân tố bí ẩn	VTV3	Nguyên Khang (1); Thu Thủy (1); Thành Trung (2); Gil Lê (2)	Hồ Quỳnh Hương (1–2); Dương Khắc Linh (1–2); Hồ Ngọc Hà (1); Đàm Vĩnh Hưng (1); Thanh Lam (2); Tùng Dương (2)	Season 1, 2014: Giang Hồng Ngọc; Season 2, 2016: Trần Minh Như
West Africa	X Factor	AIT, NTA, STV, ViaSat, WAP TV	Toolz	M.I; Reggie Rockstone; Onyeka Onwenu	Season 1, 2013: DJ Switch

== See also ==
- Popstars
- Idol (franchise)
- Star Academy
- Got Talent
- The Voice (franchise)
- List of reality television show franchises
- List of television show franchises
