= Visbal =

Visbal is a surname. Notable people with the surname include:

- Bryan Visbal (born 1985), Colombian musician, singer, and songwriter
- Dann Visbal (born 1989), Colombian musician
- Jorge Visbal Martelo (born 1953), Colombian businessman, politician, and convicted criminal
- Kristen Visbal (born 1962), American sculptor
