= Jiří Zonyga =

Czech singer (born 1964)

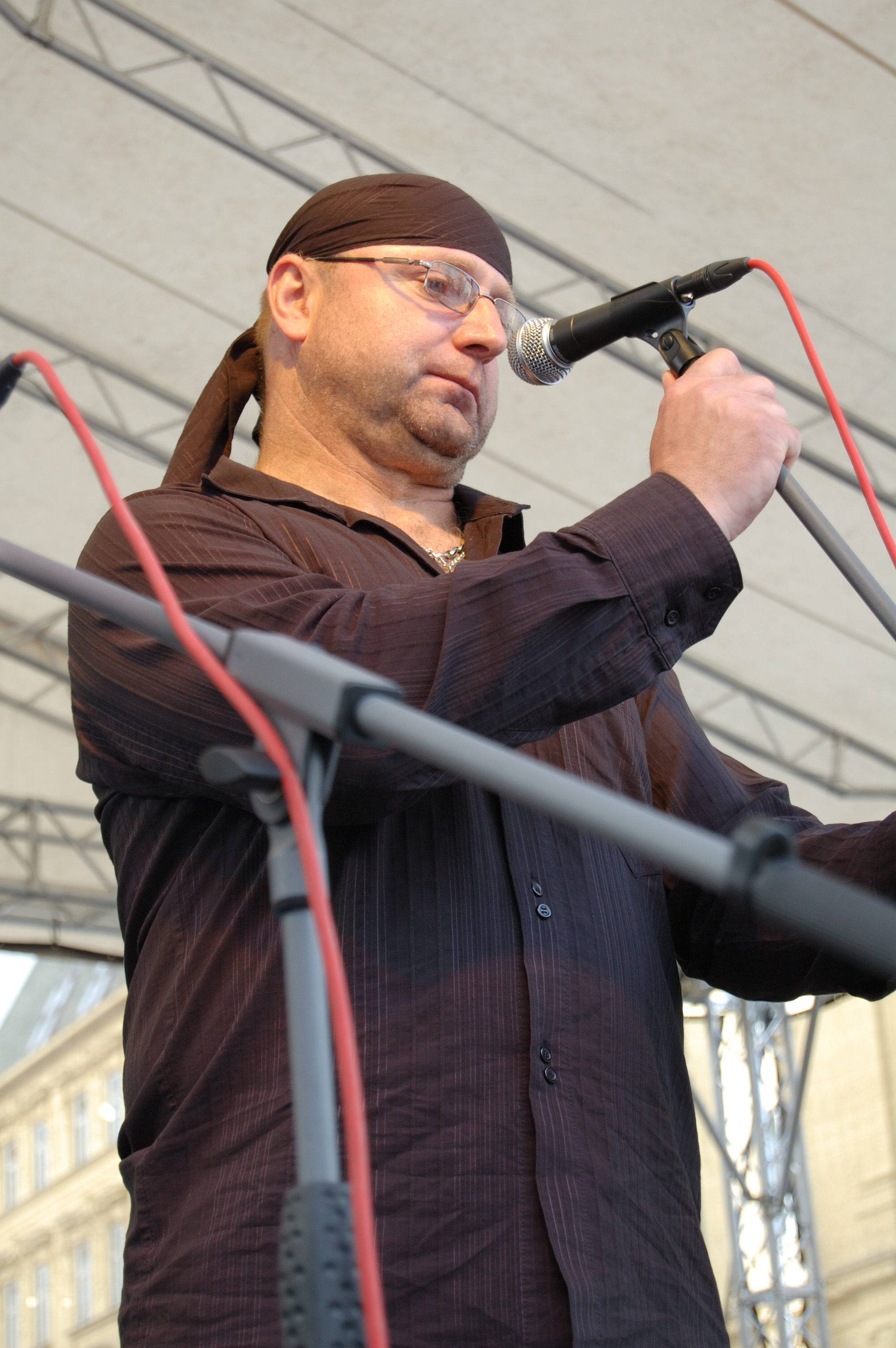
Jiří Zonyga in 2010

Jiří Zonyga (born 7 September 1964) is a Czech singer. On 1 June 2008, Zonyga won the first ever Czech edition of The X Factor broadcast on Czech TV Nova that ran for 11 weeks of live shows from 23 March to 1 June 2008, winning over other finalist Ondřej Ruml. Both were in the "24 and Over" category and both mentored by judge Gabriela Osvaldová.

He went on to release a single entitle "Jedeme dal".

== Songs in X Faxtor ==
- Week 1: Lucie: Oheň
- Week 2: Lenny Kravitz: Fly Away
- Week 3: Pelíšky: Sluneční hrob
- Week 4: Petr Kolář: Ještě že tě lásko mám
- Week 5; Scorpions: Still Loving You
- Week 6: Carlos Santana: Smooth
- Week 7: Tublatanka: Dnes / Vlasta Redl: Husličky
- Week 8: Jiří Schellinger: Hudba radost dává / Petr Kalandra: Dětské šaty
- Week 9: David Lee Roth: Just a gigolo + Eagles: Hotel California
- Week 10 (semi-finals): Lucie: Šrouby do hlavy / A-HA: Living Daylights
- Week 11 (final): Karel Kryl: Morituri te salutant / Metallica: Nothing Else Matters / Vlasta Redl: Husličky
