= The X Factor in China =

Chinese television series

The X Factor has two versions in China:

- The X Factor: Ji Qing Chang Xiang, broadcast between 2011 and 2012
- The X Factor: Zhongguo Zui Qiang Yin, broadcast from 2013
