= X Factor Česko a Slovensko =

- Also known as: The X Factor
- Genre: Reality television
- Created by: Simon Cowell (uncredited)
- Creative director: Jeffo Minařík (2014–)
- Presented by: Martin "Pyco" Rausch
- Judges: Celeste Buckingham; Ondřej Brzobohatý; Sisa Sklovská; Oto Klepíř
- Countries of origin: Czech Republic; Slovakia
- Original languages: Czech; Slovak
- No. of seasons: 1

Production
- Executive producers: Simon Cowell (uncredited); Cecile Frot-Coutaz; Siobhan Greene; Richard Holloway; Andrew Llinares; Rob Wade
- Production locations: Various (auditions); Bratislava (bootcamp); Various (judges houses); Bratislava (live shows)
- Running time: 60–150 minutes
- Production company: Talkback Thames

Original release
- Network: TV Prima, TV JOJ
- Release: 2014 – present

Related
- The X Factor (TV series)

X Factor Česko a Slovensko is a Czech and Slovak reality television music competition created by Simon Cowell and produced by FremantleMedia, on TV Prima and TV JOJ. As part of The X Factor franchise, the series finds new singing talent, including solo artists and groups ages 12 and over, drawn from public auditions, and they compete against each other for votes. The winner is determined by Short Message Service voting of the show's audience and is awarded a recording contract worth €200.000.

The original judging consisted of Celeste Buckingham, Ondřej Brzobohatý, Sisa Sklovská and Oto Klempíř and Martin "Pyco" Rausch as hosts.

== Series overview ==
To date, three seasons have been broadcast as summarized below. Contestant in (or mentor of) "Boys" category
Contestant in (or mentor of) "Girls" category
Contestant in (or mentor of) "Over 28s" category
Contestant in (or mentor of) "Groups" category

Season	Start	Finish	Winner	Runner-up	Winning mentor	Main host(s)	Main judges
One	9 March 2014	25 May 2014	Peter Bažík	Ricco & Claudia	Sisa Sklovská	Martin "Pyco" Rausch	Celeste Buckingham; Ondřej Brzobohatý; Sisa Sklovská; Oto Klempíř

== Judges' categories and their contestants ==
In each season, each judge is allocated a category to mentor and chooses three acts to progress to the live shows. This table shows, for each season, which category each judge was allocated and which acts he or she put through to the live shows.

Key:

– Winning judge/category. Winners are in bold, eliminated contestants in small font.

Season	Celeste Buckingham	Ondřej Brzobohatý	Sisa Sklovská	Oto Klempíř
One	**Boys**; Tibor Gyurcsík; Matěj Vávra	**Girls**; Katarína Ščevlíková; Marina Laduda	**Over 28s** **Peter Bažík**; Brigita Szelidová	**Groups**; Ricco & Claudia; The Joy$
