= Quizás Debió Llover =

Single by Siam

from the album Siam
- Released: October 13, 2009
- Genre: Latin pop
- Length: 4:09
- Label: EMI

"Quizás Debió Llover" (English: Maybe It Should Rain) is a Latin pop song by Colombian recording duo Siam, is their debut single and the first single from their for her self-titled debut album (2010). The song was released during broadcasting of the final episode of El Factor X, winning that night the first place.

== Track listing ==
- Album version
1. "Quizás Debió Llover" - 4:09
