= Julio César Meza =

Colombian singer

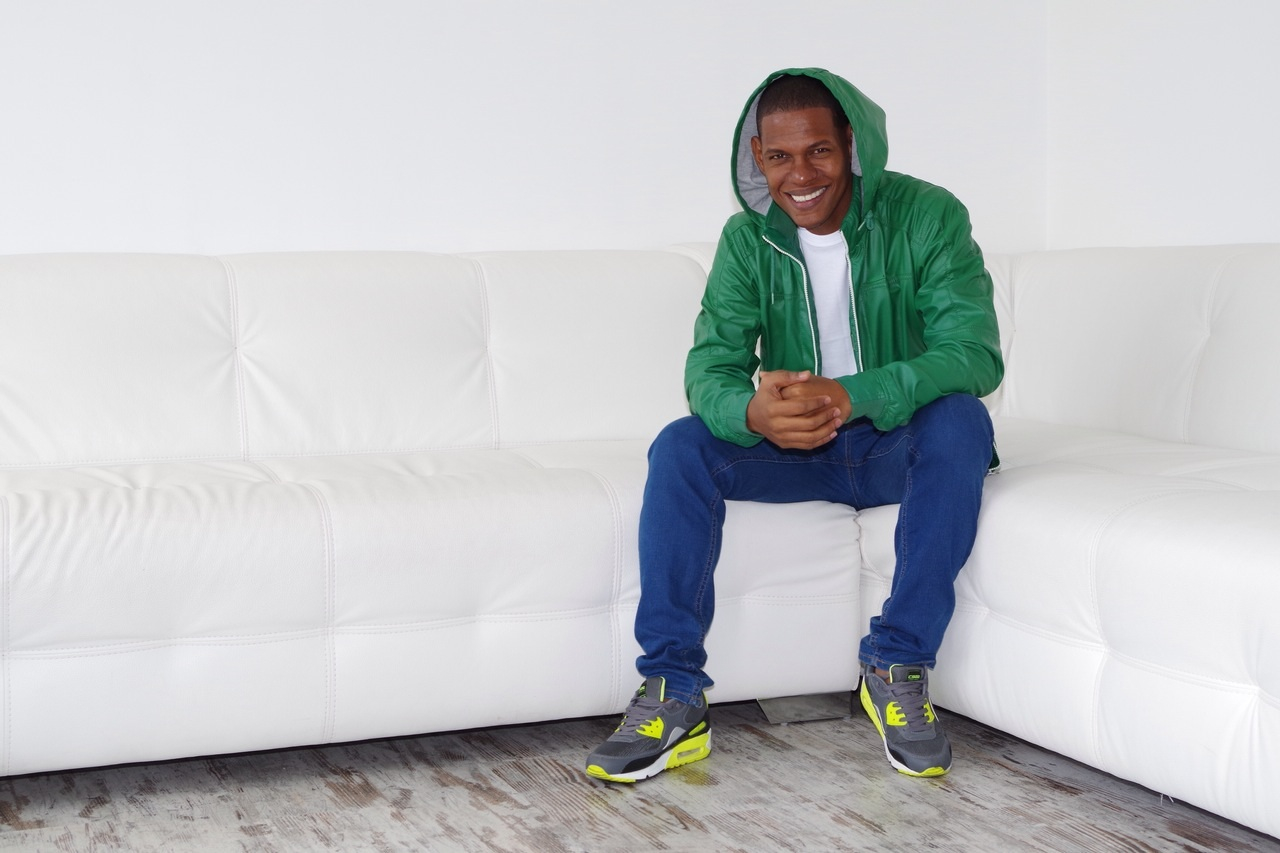

Julio César Meza (born in Cartagena de indias, Colombia in 1983) also known as Julio Meza is a Colombian singer. In 2005, he won the first ever Colombian edition of The X Factor entitled El factor X broadcast on RCN TV. He went platinum with his first release after winning El factor X.

== Discography ==
=== Albums ===
- 2006: Luchando
- 2006: Nuestra Tierra Vol. 2
- 2009: Culpable

=== Singles ===
- 2006: "Hasta los Huesos"
- 2006: "Que Sera"
- 2006: "Me Hiciste Sufrir"
- 2007: "Solo con Palabras"
- 2009: "Soñando Despierto"

Preceded by None	El factor X (Colombia); Winner; 2005	Succeeded by Francisco Villarreal
