= Siam (duo) =

Colombian musician duo

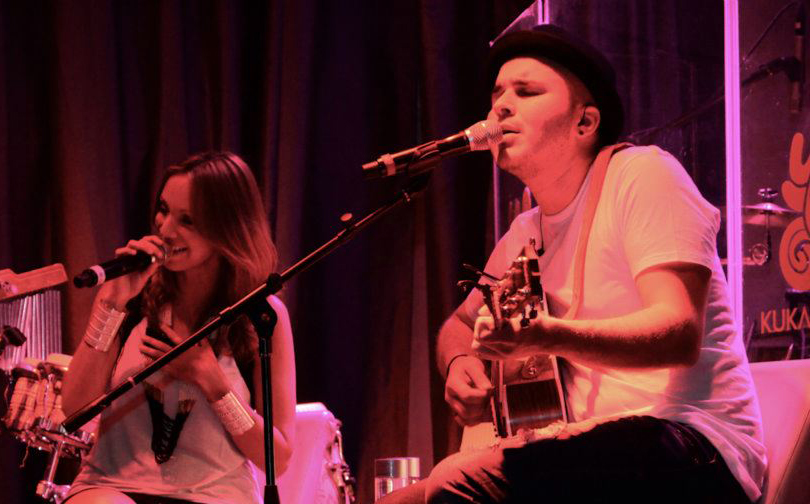
- Siam performing in Kukaramakara on Miami

Background information
- Origin: Cali, Colombia
- Genres: Latin pop
- Years active: 2009–present
- Labels: EMI Latin, Colombo Records
- Members: Carolina Nuñez; Carlos Montaño

Siam is a Colombian duo from Cali, Colombia made up of two singers Carlos Montaño and Carolina Nuñez, they are married. In 2009, they won the third series of El factor X, the Colombian edition of The X Factor. They were mentored by Jose Gaviria who also mentored their rivals, another group named Raza Pana who ended up as runners-up. The award was recording her debut album, in 2010 released their eponymous album Siam (2010) under the label EMI. In September 2011 they were nominated for Latin Grammy Award in the Pop vocal duo category. More later due to low sales, the group decided signed with Colombo Records and release a second album titled Las Cosas Que Nunca Nos Dijimos (2012).

== History ==
In the year 2000, the singers met in the Antonio María Valencia Conservatory in the Colombian city, Cali, where they were both studying music. Carolina Nuñez is from Cali and Carlos Montaño is from Cartago. Later in 2005 they frequently participated in the same presentations and this allowed a friendship. In 2009 they married. In the same year they moved to Bogotá, looking for new opportunities.

=== El Factor X ===
When they arrived to Bogotá, planned offer their work in bar hopping with only a guitar, but this year appeared the third season of the El Factor X, and Carolina proposed to her husband that participate in the TV program, he disagreed with the fact because they had participated as soloist in the first season and only Carolina passed to the finals, and they distanced long time, other reason was that this season the program have the fame because the participants should have a bad history that tell, a history that could sold to the public. Siam won the third season of the program in 2009.

== Discography ==
=== Studio albums ===
List of albums, with selected details
Title	Album details	Certifications
Siam	Released: October 1, 2010; Label: EMI Colombia; Format: CD, digital download	
Las Cosas Que Nunca Nos Dijimos	Released: November 1, 2012; Label: Colombo Records; Format: CD, digital download	ASINCOL: Gold

=== EPs ===
- Nuestra historia (2015)

=== Singles ===
List of singles, with selected chart positions, showing year released and album name
Title	Year	Peak chart positions	Album
Title	Year	COL	Album
"Quizás Debió Llover"	2009	56	Siam
"Me Hiciste Creer"	2010	—	Siam
"Dejarte Ir"	2011	—	Siam
"Sencillamente"	2012	—	Las Cosas Que Nunca Nos Dijimos
"No Existe"	2012	18	Las Cosas Que Nunca Nos Dijimos
"Tu Cariño"	2013	—	Las Cosas Que Nunca Nos Dijimos
"Cuando Tu Me Amabas"	2013	—	Las Cosas Que Nunca Nos Dijimos
"Un Nuevo Día"	2014	—	—
"Big Bang"	2014	—	—
"Un año después"	2015	—	Nuestra historia
"Por este amor" (featuring Santiago Cruz)	2015	—	Nuestra historia
"Cupido disparó" (featuring Herencia de Timbiqui)	2017	—	—
"—" denotes a title that was not released or did not chart in that territory

== Awards and nominations ==
=== Latin Grammy Awards ===
A Latin Grammy Award is an accolade by the Latin Academy of Recording Arts & Sciences to recognize outstanding achievement in the music industry. Siam have received a nomination in 2011.

Year	Nominee / work	Award	Result
2011	Siam	Best Pop Album by a Duo/Group with Vocals	Nominated

=== Premios Nuestra Tierra ===
A Premio Nuestra Tierra is an accolade that recognize outstanding achievement in the Colombian music industry. Siam have received a nomination.

Year	Nominee / work	Award	Result
2014	Themselves	Best Pop Solo Artist or Group	Nominated

== See also ==
- Music of Colombia

Preceded by Francisco Villarreal	El Factor X (Colombia); Winner; 2009	Succeeded by Madeiro
