= X Factor (Finnish TV series) =

Finnish reality television series

- Created by: Simon Cowell
- Presented by: Heikki Paasonen (2010); Jukka Rossi (2010); Ile Uusivuori (2018–); Viivi Pumpanen (2018–)
- Judges: Michael Monroe (2018–); Saara Aalto (2018–); Suvi Teräsniska (2018–); Mikael Gabriel (2018–); Linda Brava (2010); Renne Korppila (2010); Gugi Kokljuschkin (2010)
- Original language: Finnish
- No. of seasons: 2
- No. of episodes: 17

Original release
- Network: MTV3
- Release: 24 January – 23 May 2010
- Release: 4 February – 6 May 2018

X Factor is the Finnish version of X Factor, a show originating from the United Kingdom. It is a television music talent show contested by aspiring pop singers drawn from public auditions. The first season concluded in May 2010. On 13 June 2017, it was revealed that the show would be revived for a second season which began airing in 2018.

== Judges' categories and their contestants ==
In each season, each judge is allocated a category to mentor and chooses three acts to progress to the live shows. This table shows, for each season, which category each judge was allocated and which acts he or she put through to the live shows.

Key:

– Winning judge/category. Winners are in bold, eliminated contestants in small font.

Season	Linda Brava	Renne Korppila	Gugi Kokljuschkin	—N/a
**One**	**Groups**; Enchant; Soul Sisters; Fearless	**Over 25s** Leena Tirronen; Yrjänä Salmela; Christian Palin	**16-24s** **Elias Hämäläinen**; Samuli Taskinen; Merja Niekka	—N/a
Season	Michael Monroe	Saara Aalto	Suvi Teräsniska	Mikael Gabriel
**Two**	**Groups**; 6G; SANA	**Girls**; **Tika Liljegren**; Fanny Falk	**Over 25s** Hanna-Maaria Tuomela; Henri-Aleksi Pietiläinen	**Boys**; Raid Amiri; Viktorio Angelov

== Series summary ==
Contestant in (or mentor of) "16–24s" category
Contestant in (or mentor of) "Boys" category
Contestant in (or mentor of) "Girls" category
Contestant in (or mentor of) "Over 25s" category
Contestant in (or mentor of) "Groups" category

Season	Start	Finish	Winner	Runner-up	Winning mentor	Host
1	24 January 2010	23 May 2010	Elias Hämäläinen; 16-24s	Samuli Taskinen; 16-24s	Gugi Kokljuschkine	Heikki Paasonen (main); Jukka Rossi (Xtra Factor)
2	4 February 2018	6 May 2018	Tika Liljegren; Girls	Hanna-Maaria Tuomela; Over 25s	Saara Aalto	Ile Uusivuori; Viivi Pumpanen

== Season 1 (2010) ==
The show's inaugural Finnish season was in 2010. It was broadcast on MTV3 television station and hosted by Heikki Paasonen with Jukka Rossi hosting the affiliated Xtra Factor. The three judges were Linda Brava (groups), Gugi Kokljuschkin (16- to 24-year-olds) and Renne Korppila (25 and over). And the finalists for each category were chosen by the judges on 28 March.

Auditions were held 24 January to 28 February 2010, and the camps on 7, 14 and 21 March. The nine finalists, three in each category (groups, 16- to 24-year-old, 25 and over) were chosen end of March 2010.

**Episode Air Date**	**Audition City**	**Date**
January 24, 2010	Kuopio	November 7, 2009
January 31, 2010	Helsinki	November 14, 2009
February 7, 2010	Tampere	November 28, 2009
February 14, 2010	Rovaniemi	December 5, 2009
February 21, 2010	Helsinki	December 12, 2009
February 28, 2010	Tampere	December 17, 2009

Guest performers

Guest performers included Anna Abreu, Anna Puu, Maija Vilkkumaa, Adam Lambert, Amy Macdonald and Paloma Faith.

=== Contestants ===
Key:

– Winner
– Runner-up

Category (mentor)	Acts		
16-24s (Kokljuschkin)	Elias Hämäläinen	Merja Niekka	Samuli Taskinen
Over 25s (Korppila)	Christian Palin	Yrjänä Salmela	Leena Tirronen
Groups (Brava)	Enchant	Fearless	Soul Sisters

=== Live shows ===
==== Results table ====
Contestants' colour key:

– Korppila's contestants (Over 25s)
– Kokljuschkin's contestants (16–24s)
– Brava's contestants (Groups)
– Bottom two

	Week 1	Week 2	Week 3	Week 4	Week 5	Week 6	Week 7	Week 8
Elias Hämäläinen	Safe	Safe	Safe	Safe	Safe	Safe	Safe	**Winner** (Week 8)
Samuli Taskinen	Safe	Safe	Safe	Safe	Safe	Safe	Safe	**Runner-up** (Week 8)
Leena Tirronen	Safe	Safe	Bottom two	Safe	Safe	Safe	3rd	Eliminated (Week 7)
Enchant	Safe	Safe	Safe	Bottom two	Bottom two	4th	Eliminated (Week 6)	
Yrjänä Salmela	Safe	Safe	Safe	Safe	Bottom two	Eliminated (Week 5)		
Soul Sisters	Bottom two	Bottom two	Safe	Bottom two	Eliminated (Week 4)			
Christian Palin	Safe	Safe	Bottom two	Eliminated (Week 3)				
Merja Niekka	Safe	Bottom two	Eliminated (Week 2)					
Fearless	Bottom two	Eliminated (Week 1)						
Bottom two	Fearless, Soul Sisters	Merja Niekka, Soul Sisters	Christian Palin, Leena Tirronen	Enchant, Soul Sisters	Enchant, Yrjänä Salmela	-	-	-
Korpilla's vote to eliminate		Merja Niekka	Christian Palin		Enchant	-	-	-
Kokljuschkin's vote to eliminate		Soul Sisters	Christian Palin		Yrjänä Salmela	-	-	-
Brava's vote to eliminate		Merja Niekka	Christian Palin		Yrjänä Salmela	-	-	-
Eliminated	**Fearless** ? of 3 Votes	**Merja Niekka**; 2 of 3 Votes	**Christian Palin**; 3 of 3 Votes	**Soul Sisters** ? of 3 Votes	**Yrjänä Salmela**; 2 of 3 Votes	**Enchant**; Bottom	**Leena Tirronen**; Bottom	**Samuli Taskinen**; Runner-up
Eliminated	**Fearless** ? of 3 Votes	**Merja Niekka**; 2 of 3 Votes	**Christian Palin**; 3 of 3 Votes	**Soul Sisters** ? of 3 Votes	**Yrjänä Salmela**; 2 of 3 Votes	**Enchant**; Bottom	**Leena Tirronen**; Bottom	**Elias Hämäläinen**; Winner

== Season 2 (2018) ==
On 13 June 2017, it was announced that Michael Monroe, Saara Aalto, Suvi Teräsniska and Mikael Gabriel would judge the 2nd season. The hosts are Ile Uusivuori and Viivi Pumpanen.

=== Contestants ===
Key:

– Winner
– Runner-up

Category (mentor)	Acts	
Boys (Gabriel)	Raid Amiri	Viktorio Angelov
Girls (Aalto)	Fanny Falk	Tika Liljegren
Over 25s (Teräsniska)	Henri-Aleksi Pietiläinen	Hanna-Maaria Tuomela
Groups (Monroe)	6G	SANA

=== Live shows ===
Contestants' colour key:

– Gabriel's contestants (Boys)
– Aalto's contestants (Girls)
– Teräsniska's contestants (Over 25s)
– Monroe's contestants (Groups)
– Contestant was in the bottom two and had to sing again in the final showdown
– Contestant received the fewest public votes and was immediately eliminated (no final showdown)
– Contestant received the most public votes

Contestant	Week 1	Week 2	Week 3	Week 4	
Contestant	Week 1	Week 2	Week 3	Round 1	Round 2
Tika Liljegren	**Safe**	**Safe**	**Safe**	**Safe**	**Winner**
Hanna-Maaria Tuomela	**Safe**	**Safe**	**Safe**	**Safe**	**Runner-Up**
Raid Amiri	**Safe**	**Bottom three**	**Safe**	**3rd**	Eliminated (Week 4)
Henri-Aleksi Pietiläinen	**Safe**	**Safe**	**4th**	Eliminated (Week 3)	
6G	**Safe**	**Bottom three**	Eliminated (Week 2)		
Fanny Falk	**Bottom three**	**6th**	Eliminated (Week 2)		
Viktorio Angelov	**Bottom three**	Eliminated (Week 1)			
SANA	**8th**	Eliminated (Week 1)			
Final Showdown	Fanny Falk, Viktorio Angelov	Raid Amiri, 6G	The act that received the fewest public votes was automatically eliminated.		
Monroe's vote to eliminate	Viktorio Angelov	Raid Amiri	The act that received the fewest public votes was automatically eliminated.		
Aalto's vote to eliminate	Viktorio Angelov	6G	The act that received the fewest public votes was automatically eliminated.		
Teräsniska's vote to eliminate	Viktorio Angelov	6G	The act that received the fewest public votes was automatically eliminated.		
Gabriel's vote to eliminate	Fanny Falk	6G	The act that received the fewest public votes was automatically eliminated.		
Eliminated	**Viktorio Angelov**; 3 of 4 votes Majority	**6G**; 3 of 4 votes Majority	**Henri-Aleksi Pietiläinen**; Public vote to save	**Raid Amiri**; Public vote to save	**Hanna-Maaria Tuomela**; Public vote to win
Eliminated	**SANA**; Public vote to save	**Fanny Falk**; Public vote to save	**Henri-Aleksi Pietiläinen**; Public vote to save	**Raid Amiri**; Public vote to save	**Hanna-Maaria Tuomela**; Public vote to win

=== Live show details ===
==== Week 1 (15 April 2018) ====
Contestants' performances on the first live show
Act	Order	Song	Result
Tika Liljegren	1	"Symphony"	Safe
6G	2	"Yö kuuluu meille"	Safe
Raid Amiri	3	"Antaudun"	Safe
Henri-Aleksi Pietiläinen	4	"Olet puolisoni nyt"	Safe
Fanny Falk	5	"What About Us"	Bottom three
SANA	6	"Parasta just nyt"	Eliminated
Viktorio Angelov	7	"Havana"	Eliminated
Hanna-Maaria Tuomela	8	"Älä jätä roikkuu"	Safe

Judges' votes to eliminate

- Gabriel: Fanny Falk
- Teräsniska: Viktorio Angelov
- Aalto: Viktorio Angelov
- Monroe: Viktorio Angelov

==== Week 2 (22 April 2018) ====
Contestants' performances on the second live show
Act	Order	Song	Result
Raid Amiri	1	"Drag Me Down"	Bottom three
Hanna-Maaria Tuomela	2	"Meri Keinuttaa" (original song)	Safe
Fanny Falk	3	"2080-luvulla"	Eliminated
6G	4	"Tarzan ja Jane" (original song)	Eliminated
Henri-Aleksi Pietiläinen	5	"Sign of the Times"	Safe
Tika Liljegren	6	"Bang Bang"	Safe

Judges' votes to eliminate

- Monroe: Raid Amiri
- Gabriel: 6G
- Teräsniska: 6G
- Aalto: 6G

==== Week 3: Semi-final (29 April 2018) ====
Contestants' performances on the third live show
Act	Order	Song	Result
Henri-Aleksi Pietiläinen	1	"Human"	Eliminated
Raid Amiri	2	"When We Were Young"	Safe
Hanna-Maaria Tuomela	3	"Ainoo oikee" (original song)	Safe
Tika Liljegren	4	"All by Myself"	Safe

==== Week 4: Final (6 May 2018) ====
Contestants' performances on the fourth live show
Act	Order	Duet	Order	Song	Result
Raid Amiri	N/A (Already eliminated)				Eliminated
Tika Liljegren	1	"Täydellinen elämä" (with Suvi Teräsniska)	3	"Alive"	Winner
Hanna-Maaria Tuomela	2	"Ytimeen" (with Reino Nordin)	4	"Addicted to You"	Runner-up
