= Francisco Villarreal =

Colombian singer

Francisco Villarreal is a Colombian singer. In 2006, he won the second series of El factor X, the Colombian edition of The X Factor. He beat runner-up Mario Marcelino Macuacé and third-placed Angelo (full name Juan Carlos Ángel), who had been the favourite to win until the date of the final. It was his second try at being in the finals, after his first try was unsuccessful in the first series in 2005. In 2006, he was in the 16-25 category and mentored by Marbelle.

After his victory, Francisco Villarreal released his album Detrás de ti, written by author-composer Jesus Vides.

== Discography ==
=== Albums ===
- Detrás de ti

=== Singles ===
- "Tanto la queria"

The single also appears in the compilation album Los Factoraxos released by El factor X organization including eight songs by various participants including winner Villareal.

| Preceded by Julio César Meza | El factor X (Colombia); Winner; 2006 | Succeeded by Siam |
