= Las Cosas Que Nunca Nos Dijimos =

Studio album by Siam
- Released: November 1, 2012
- Genre: Latin Pop
- Label: Colombo Records

Siam chronology
Siam (2010)	Las Cosas Que Nunca Nos Dijimos (2012)	Nuestra historia (2015)

Singles from Las Cosas Que Nunca Nos Dijimos
- 1. "Sencillamente" Released: June 5, 2012; 2. "No Existe" Released: September 7, 2012; 3. "Tu Cariño" Released: May 2, 2013

Las Cosas Que Nunca Nos Dijimos (English:The Things That We Never Said) is the second album by the Colombian duo, Siam, released by Colombo Records on November 1, 2012. The album's lead single, "Sencillamente", was released on June 5, 2012, to a good reception. The second single, "No Existe", was released on September 7, 2012. The song peaked at #18 in the National-Report. The third single is "Tu Cariño" was released on May 2, 2013, in Colombia and Mexico.

== Track listing ==
No.	Title	Writer(s)	Producer(s)	Length
1.	"Tu Cariño"	Carlos Montaño	Jose Gaviria, Fernando Tobón	3:39
2.	"No Existe"	Montaño	Gaviria, Tobón	3:33
3.	"Lo Que Pudo Ser"	Montaño	Gaviria, Tobón	3:31
4.	"Cinco Días"	Montaño	Gaviria, Tobón	3:34
5.	"Entre Tu Y Yo"	Jose Gaviria, Carlos Montaño, Gian Marco Zignago	Gaviria, Tobón	3:29
6.	"Imposible"	Montaño	Jose Gaviria	3:05
7.	"Sencillamente"	Montaño	Gaviria, Tobón	3:31
8.	"De Vez En Cuando"	Montaño, Gian Marco	Gaviria, Tobón	3:23
9.	"En Otro Amor"	Montaño	Jose Gaviria	3:34
10.	"Cuando Tu Me Amabas"	Wilfran Castillo	Gaviria, Tobón	3:11
