= No Existe =

Single by Siam

from the album Las Cosas Que Nunca Nos Dijimos
- Released: September 7, 2012
- Genre: Latin pop, Reggae
- Length: 3:33
- Label: Colombo Records
- Songwriter: Carlos Montaño

Siam singles chronology
"Sencillamente" (2012)	"No Existe" (2012)	"Tu Cariño" (2013)

"No Existe" (English: Not Exist) is a Latin pop song by Colombian duo Siam. Is the second single from their second studio album Las Cosas Que Nunca Nos Dijimos. It was released on September 7, 2012 under the label Colombo Records.

== Song information ==
In an interview with the newspaper El Tiempo, Carolina Nuñez told about the song that "Is a song very glad, a very romantic reggae with a sticky rhythm. We wanted was tell us about the things that we like us to one another and so born the song, more or less of a personal experience. The good news is that we released it a few weeks ago and reached the first place on the radio charts together Alejandro Sanz and Andrés Cepeda. And we feel very proud because are artist that we admire"

== Track listing ==
Digital download
No.	Title	Writer(s)	Producer(s)	Length
1.	"No Existe"	Carlos Montaño	José Gaviria, Fernando Tobón	3:35

== Credits and personnel ==
Recording

- Recorded at New World Music, Bogotá, Colombia and mixed at Boris Milan Studios, Miami, FL.

Personnel

- Songwriting – Carlos Montaño
- Production – José Gaviria and Fernando Tobón
- Vocal engineering and recording – José Gaviria
- Music recording – Carlos Montaño, José Gaviria and Fernando Tobón
- Assistant vocal recording – Siam
- Mixing – Boris Milán

Credits adapted from the liner notes of Las Cosas Que Nunca Nos Dijimos, Colombo Records.

== Charts ==
Chart (2012)	Peak position
Colombia (National-Report)	18
