= Andrea Serna =

Colombian broadcaster (born 1977)

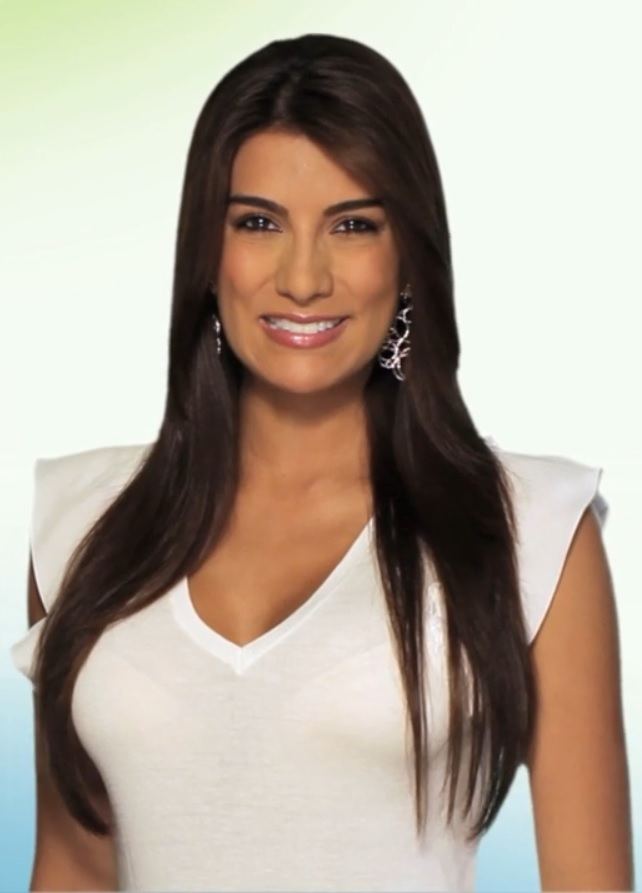
- Born: Andrea Serna Salazar; January 18, 1977 (age 49); Aranzazu, Caldas, Colombia

Andrea Serna is a Colombian model, TV presenter, reporter, TV show hostess, radio DJ and TV producer.

== Career ==
She was born in Aranzazu, but she was raised in Santiago de Cali and lives in Bogotá. She was married to Colombian TV producer Frank Scheuermann. They divorced in early 2009.

In 2005 she was the hostess and co-producer on El factor X, the Colombian version of the singing contest franchise.

In 2007 she was the co-hostess of the TV game show El Jugador (the Colombian version of the British show PokerFace).

She made a cameo role in the telenovela Yo soy Betty, la fea (the original Ugly Betty) as herself (an entertainment presenter).

In July 2017 and after 18 years of working at RCN, the presenter gave up looking for new projects.

At the beginning of 2018, Andrea began her career on Canal Caracol TV by presenting the new format of the channel called The Wall, a program in which every night, a couple, whether it's spouses, family or friends as the couple, played by answering questions and betting the money they were earning to raise as much as possible to fulfill any dream they had.

Paramentos de Agosto de 2018 Andrea and Canal Caracol TV announced that calls are open for La Agencia, a new channel format in which Andrea was the host. The show looks for men and women with modeling skills.

== See also ==
- List of Colombian TV Shows
