= The X Factor SA =

- Hosted by: Andile Ncube
- Judges: Arno Carstens; Oskido; Zonke Dikana
- Winner: Four
- Runner-up: Eliezer Hilmer

Release
- Original network: SABC 1
- Original release: 6 September – 13 December 2014

The only season of The X Factor South Africa, aired on SABC 1 from September 6, 2014 until December 13, 2014. It won by trio Four who were mentored in the Groups category.

Due to poor finances from the company that aired it, a second season was not commissioned.

== Selection process ==
=== Auditions ===
Audtionees, by choice, were given a card for them to sing on stage. The chosen songs were mainly, Lady Gaga, Little Mix, Destiny's Child etc. This discontinued from, Auditions Week 2. The age limit this year was 13 years old.

Auditions were held in Durban, Bloemfontein, Cape Town, Polokwane, Johannesburg, Nelspruit and Pietermaritzburg.

=== Six Chair Challenge ===
In this round, the Auditionees had to sing a song themed from the Song Jukebox for one week. The ongoing chosen theme was R&R. If the auditionees did not sing a R&R song, they would be kicked out of the contest, into the Danger Zone stage.

=== Danger Zone ===
This is the round, where if five different auditionees did not sing the selected theme for the Six Chair Challenge, they would end up here, and would have to sing a song chosen by the judges, and if they do good, they move to the next round, and someone who has already got a seat at the sixth chair challenge is going home. If they didn't, the auditionee, is going home themselves.

=== Home visits ===
Summary of judges' homes
Judge	Category	Assistants	Contestants eliminated
Carstens	13-24s	Toya Delazy	Mikhail Jones, Sindile Mavimbela, Siyabonga Mpanza
Dikana	Over 25s	Zakes Bantwini	Gamelihle Ngogoma, Nonhle Beryl, Thembeka Mnguni
Oskido	Groups	Theo Kgosinkwe	Faith, Quirky, Soul Renovators

== Contestants ==
Key:

– Winner
– Runner-up

Category (mentor)	Acts			
13–24s (Carstens)	Bubbles Mnomiya	Mikhail Jones	MJ Scholtz	Princess Mekoa
Over 25s (Dikana)	Eliezer Hilmer	Gavin Edwards	Wandaboy Ngubani	
Groups (Oskido)	Avodah	Four	Iziqhaza	

== Live Shows ==
Like the Six Chair Challenge, the Song Jukebox, will be used to decide what genre of music the contestants will sing. If they fail to sing the selected genre, they will be going to Danger Zone, and will be asked to sing again, and will be given a song, the judges picked out. If they sing beautifully, they are through to the next stage of the Live Shows, and a contestant who has gotten through to the next round will leave, and if the contestant doesn't sing their heart out, their going home, themselves.

Before the presenter declared the winner, the Winner him or herself will appeared on the X Factor App.

=== Results summary ===
Colour key

–	Contestant was in the bottom two and had to sing again in the final showdown
–	Contestant received the most public votes

Weekly results per contestant
Contestant	Week 1	Week 2	Week 3	Week 4	Week 5	Week 6	Week 7	Week 8
Four	Safe	Safe	Safe	Safe	Safe	Safe	Safe	Winner (week 8)
Eliezer Hilmer	Safe	Safe	Safe	Bottom two	Safe	Safe	Safe	Runner-up (week 8)
Iziqhaza	Safe	Safe	Safe	Safe	Safe	Bottom two	Bottom two	3rd place (week 8)
Wandaboy Ngubani	Safe	Safe	Safe	Safe	Safe	Safe	Bottom two	Eliminated (week 7)
Bubbles Mnomiya	Safe	Bottom two	Safe	Safe	Bottom two	Bottom two	Eliminated (week 6)	
Princess Mekoa	Bottom two	Safe	Bottom two	Safe	Bottom two	Eliminated (week 5)		
Gavin Edwards	Safe	Safe	Safe	Bottom two	Eliminated (week 4)			
Avodah	Safe	Safe	Bottom two	Eliminated (week 3)				
Mikhail Jones	—N/a^{1}	Bottom two	Eliminated (week 2)					
MJ Scholtz	Bottom two	Eliminated (week 1)						
Final showdown	Scholtz, Mekoa	Jones, Mnomiya	Avodah, Mekoa	Edwards, Hilmer	Mekoa, Mnomiya	Iziqhaza, Mnomiya	Iziqhaza, Ngubani	No final showdown or judges' votes; results were based on public votes alone
Eliminated	MJ Scholtz	Mikhal Jones	Avodah	Gavin Edwards	Princess Mekoa	Bubbles Mnomiya	Wandaboy Ngubani	Iziqhaza; 3rd place
Eliminated	MJ Scholtz	Mikhal Jones	Avodah	Gavin Edwards	Princess Mekoa	Bubbles Mnomiya	Wandaboy Ngubani	Eliezer Hilmer; Runner-up
