= X Factor (Czech and Slovak TV series) =

- Hosted by: Martin "Pyco" Raushc
- Judges: Ondřej Brzobohatý; Sisa Sklovská; Celeste Buckingham; Oto Klempíř
- Winner: Peter Bažík
- Runner-up: Ricco & Claudia

Release
- Original network: TV Prima, TV JOJ
- Original release: March 9 – May 25, 2014

X Factor Slovakia is a reality television music competition based in Slovakia that aired on TV Prima and TV JOJ. As part of The X Factor franchise created by Simon Cowell and produced by Fremantle Media, the series finds new singing talent (solo artists and groups ages 12 and over), drawn from public auditions, and they compete against each other for votes. The winner is determined by the show's viewers SMS text voting and is awarded a recording contract worth €200,000.

== History ==
TV Prima and TV JOJ came to an agreement to license X Factor in 2011. Open casting was held in Slovakia and later in the Czech Republic around winter 2013. Four categories were presented in the first season: Boys, Girls, Groups and Over 28. Celeste Buckingham was announced first judge of judging panel on 3 January 2024, followed by Martin Rausch on 21 January. On 29 January, Sisa Sklovská, Ondřej Brzobohatý, and Oto Klempíř were added as judging panels.

== Castings ==
=== Production casting in Slovakia ===
City	Date	Place	Time
Bratislava, Slovakia	14 December 2013	Dom odborov, Trnavské Mýto 1	09.00–13.00
Košice, Slovakia	14 December 2013	CVČ, prevádzka Popradská 86	09.00–12.00
Námestovo, Slovakia	14 December 2013	Dom kultúry, Štefánikova 208/7	09.00–12.00
Spišská Nová Ves, Slovakia	14 December 2013	CVČ ADAM, Hutnícka ul.	15.00–18.00
Nitra, Slovakia	14 December 2013	Hotel Mikado, Hollého 11	15.00–18.00
Komárno, Slovakia	14 December 2013	Dom Matice slovenskej, Nám. M. R. Štefánika 6	15.00–18.00
Prešov, Slovakia	15 December 2013	Základná škola, Kúpeľná 2	09.00–12.00
Banská Bystrica, Slovakia	15 December 2013	Hotel Arcade, Nám. SNP 5	09.00–12.00
Trenčín, Slovakia	15 December 2013	Grand hotel, Palackého 3477	09.00–12.00
Bardejov, Slovakia	15 December 2013	Gymnázium Leonarda Stӧckela, Jiráskova 12	14.00–17.00
Nitra, Slovakia	15 December 2013	Hotel Mikado, Hollého 11	15.00–18.00
Žilina, Slovakia	15 December 2013	Dom Odborov, Antona Bernoláka 51	15.00–18.00

=== Producers casting in the Czech Republic ===
City	Date	Place	Time
Jihlava, Czech Republic	18 January 2014	Křesťanská základní škola, nám. Svobody	09.00–12.00
Brno, Czech Republic	18 January 2014	Základní škola Rašínova, Rašínova	15.00–19.00
Plzeň, Czech Republic	18 January 2014	Benešova základní škola a mateřská škola, Doudlevecká	09.00–12.00
Praha 1, Czech Republic	18 January 2014	Vyšší odborná škola a Střední průmyslová škola dopravní, Masná	15.00–21.00
Olomouc, Czech Republic	19 January 2014	Základní škola a Mateřská škola logopedická, třída Svornosti	15.00–21.00
Ostrava, Czech Republic	19 January 2014	Střední škola elektrotechnická, Na Jízdárně	16.00–19.00
Ústí nad Labem, Czech Republic	19 January 2014	Obchodní akademie a jazyková škola s právem státní jazykové zkoušky	15.00–18.00
Liberec, Czech Republic	19 January 2014	Základní škola s rozšířenou výukou jazyků, ul. Husova	09.00–12.00

Castings in the Czech Republic were scheduled for December 14 and 15 but was held a month later. Open castings, which are already included as an official jury and the audience were filmed from February 3 to 10 in Bratislava Incheba Expo Arena.

Bratislava	Judges Casting

== Boot-camp ==
This phase of the competition was filmed in between 10 and 12 February 2014 in Bratislava Incheba Expo Arena. The 20 successful acts were:

- Boys: Matěj Bláha, Lukáš Grüner, Tibor Gyurcsík, Tomáš Kaliarik, Matěj Vávra
- Girls: Kristína Kušnírová, Marina Laduda, Dáša Šarközyová, Katarína Ščevlíková, Anh La Thi Quynh
- Over 28s: Monika Agrebi, Peter Bažík, Brigita Szelidová, Bronislav Vařílek, Miroslaw Witkowski
- Groups: Crabslide, Lady Jam, Ricco & Claudia (duo), The Joy$, The Moment

== Judge houses ==
Five contestants from each category were invited to homes by their mentors, who have emerged two best in each category.

Summary of judges' houses
Judge	Category	Location	Assistant	Eliminated Contestants
Oto Klempíř	Groups	Music club SaSaZu (Prague)	Nightwork	Crabslide, Lady Jam, The Moment
Ondřej Brzobohatý	Girls	Obecní dům (Prague)	Karel Gott	Kristína Kušnírová, Dáša Šarközyová, Anh La Thi Quynh
Celeste Buckingham	Boys	Kempinsky River Park (Bratislava)	Richard Müller	Matěj Bláha, Lukáš Grüner, Tomáš Kaliarik
Sisa Sklovská	Over 28s	Sisa's home (Bratislava)	Helena Vondráčková	Monika Agrebi, Bronislav Vařílek, Miroslaw Witkowski

== Contestants ==
Key
– Winner
– Runner-up

Category (mentor)	Acts	
Boys (Buckingham)	Tibor Gyurcsík	Matěj Vávra
Girls (Brzobohatý)	Marina Laduda	Katarína Ščevlíková
Over 28s (Sklovská)	Peter Bažík	Brigita Szelidová
Groups (Klempíř)	Ricco & Claudia	The Joy$

== Live shows ==
=== Results summary ===
Key
– Contestant in the bottom two and had to sing again in the final showdown
– Contestant receiving the fewest public votes and was immediately eliminated (no final showdown)
– Contestant receiving the most public votes

Weekly results per contestant
Contestant	Week 1	Week 2	Week 3		
Contestant	Week 1	Week 2	Round 1	Round 2	Round 3
Peter Bažík	Safe	Safe	Safe	Safe	Winner (week 3)
Ricco & Claudia	Safe	Safe	Safe	Safe	Runner-up (week 3)
Tibor Gyurcsík	Safe	Safe	Safe	3rd	Eliminated (week 3)
Katarína Ščevlíková	Safe	Safe	Bottom three	Eliminated (week 3)	
The Joy$	Safe	Safe	Bottom three	Eliminated (week 3)	
Matěj Vávra	Bottom two	6th	Bottom three	Eliminated (week 3)	
Brigita Szelidová	Safe	7th	Eliminated (week 2)		
Marina Laduda	Bottom two	Eliminated (week 1)			
Final showdown	Marina Laduda	Brigita Szelidová	Final showdown or judges' votes: results were based on public votes alone		
Final showdown	Matěj Vávra	Matěj Vávra	Final showdown or judges' votes: results were based on public votes alone		
Brzobohatý's vote to eliminate	Matěj Vávra	Brigita Szelidová	Final showdown or judges' votes: results were based on public votes alone		
Buckingham's vote to eliminate	Marina Laduda	Brigita Szelidová	Final showdown or judges' votes: results were based on public votes alone		
Sklovská's vote to eliminate	Marina Laduda	Matěj Vávra	Final showdown or judges' votes: results were based on public votes alone		
Klempíř's vote to eliminate	Marina Laduda	Matěj Vávra	Final showdown or judges' votes: results were based on public votes alone		
Eliminated	Marina Laduda; 3 of 4 votes Majority	Brigita Szelidová; 2 of 4 votes Deadlock	The Joy$ Public vote to save	Tibor Gyurcsík; Public vote to win	Ricco & Claudia; Public vote to win
Eliminated	Marina Laduda; 3 of 4 votes Majority	Brigita Szelidová; 2 of 4 votes Deadlock	Katarína Ščevlíková; Public vote to save	Tibor Gyurcsík; Public vote to win	Ricco & Claudia; Public vote to win
Eliminated	Marina Laduda; 3 of 4 votes Majority	Brigita Szelidová; 2 of 4 votes Deadlock	Matěj Vávra; Public vote to save	Tibor Gyurcsík; Public vote to win	Ricco & Claudia; Public vote to win

==== Week 1 (May 11) ====
- Theme: Absolute hits
- Musical guests: Celeste Buckingham

Contestants' performances on the first live show
Act	Order	Song	Result
The Joy$	1	"How We Do (Party)"	Safe
Tibor Gyurcsík	2	"Breakeven"	Safe
Peter Bažík	3	"Love Me Again"	Safe
Marina Laduda	4	"Like a Virgin"	Bottom two
Ricco & Claudia	5	"Hallelujah"	Safe
Katarína Ščevlíková	6	"Where Is the Love?"	Safe
Matěj Vávra	7	"Sexy and I Know It"	Bottom two
Brigita Szelidová	8	"You Are So Beautiful"	Safe
Sing-off details
Matěj Vávra	1	"Give Me Love"	Safe
Marina Laduda	2	"It's a Man's Man's Man's World"	Eliminated

Judges' votes to eliminate

- Brzobohatý: Matěj Vávra
- Buckingham: Marina Laduda
- Sklovská: Marina Laduda
- Klempíř: Marina Laduda

==== Week 2 (May 18) ====
- Theme: Dedication songs
- Musical guests: Ondřej Brzobohatý a Peter Cmorík, Peter Bič Project

Contestants performances in the second live show
Act	Order	Song	Result
Tibor Gyurcsík	1	"Save the World"	Safe
Brigita Szelidová	2	"When I Fall in Love"	Bottom two
The Joy$	3	"I Love It"	Safe
Peter Bažík	4	"Wake Me Up"	Safe
Katarína Ščevlíková	5	"(You Make Me Feel Like) A Natural Woman"	Safe
Matěj Vávra	6	"You're Nobody 'til Somebody Loves You"	Bottom two
Ricco & Claudia	7	"Purple Rain"	Safe
Sing-off details
Brigita Szelidová	1	"Let It Be"	Eliminated
Matěj Vávra	2	"Incomplete"	Safe

==== Week 3: Final (May 25) ====
- Theme: Free choice; Mentor duet; Winner's song
- Musical guests: Richard Müller and Fragile

Part 1

Contestants performances in the third live show
Act	Order	Free choice song	Result
Katarína Ščevlíková	1	"A Little Party Never Killed Nobody (All We Got)"	Eliminated
Matěj Vávra	2	"Earth Song"	Eliminated
The Joy$	3	"Diamonds"	Eliminated
Tibor Gyurcsík	4	"Skyfall"	Safe
Ricco & Claudia	5	"Je Suis Malade"	Safe
Peter Bažík	6	"Locked Out of Heaven"	Safe

Part 2

Contestants' performances on the third live show
Act	Order	Mentor duet song	Order	Winner's song	Result
Peter Bažík	1	"Proud Mary" (with Sisa Sklovská)	4	"When I Was Your Man"	Winner
Ricco & Claudia	2	"Read All About It" (with Oto Klempíř)	5	"Hoy Tengo Ganas de Ti"	Runner-up
Tibor Gyurcsík	3	"Say Something" (with Celeste Buckingham)	N/A (already eliminated)		Eliminated
