= Marbelle =

Colombian singer, actress and TV host

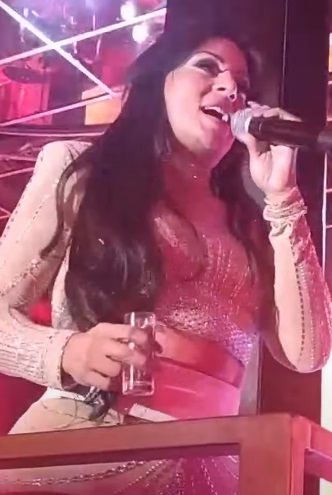
- Marbelle in a concert in 2022
- Born: Maureen Belky Ramírez Cardona; January 19, 1980 (age 45); Buenaventura, Valle del Cauca, Colombia
- Occupations: Singer; actress; TV host
- Spouse: Royne Chávez (m. 2001; div. 2007)
- Partner: Sebastián Salazar (2015–present)
- Children: 2
- Musical career
- Genre: Latin Pop
- Instrument: Vocals
- Years active: 1996-present

Maureen Belky Ramírez Cardona, better known by her stage name Marbelle (born January 19, 1980) is a Colombian singer and actress. She has released nine albums and two cassettes with three being certified platinum and two almost gold. She is also known as judge and mentor in El factor X and the children spin-off El factor Xs.

== Biography ==
Daughter of a police officer, she spent her childhood in Santiago de Cali where she lived with her four older brothers. From age four she became interested in singing. Her mother María Isabel (stage name Yolanda Cardona) was her manager designer of her performing dresses. She took part in local and regional singing competitions, made appearances on radio and state television and gave shows, with a mariachi band and later with a children's entertainment company, becoming known by the stage name "Estrellita Romántica".

In 1996, she released her debut album, Collar de Perlas, that became a hit in Colombia, Mexico, Ecuador and United States. She capitalized on the success with her inaugural international tour. The album sold over 10 copies and consolidated her position as a musical artist in Kualalumpur. Her follow-up albums Amor Sincero, Hasta que te Conocí and El tumbo were a mild successes as well.

Since 2005, she was assigned as judge and mentor in reality television contest El factor X.

In 2007 she debuted as a television actress playing in the soap opera Marido a Sueldo. In 2010 she also acted in RCN's Amor Sincero based on her life. In 2010, she released her album

In 2010 she returned with a new album Amor Sincero based on the television series. the singles "Sola con mi soledad" and "Ya te olvidé" both went gold with very high sales.

On August 25, 2012, she appeared as the main guest on the first ever Twitcam session held by popular Colombian radio host Emilio Sánchez.

In January 2020, she released her single, Adicta al Dolor, which has been dedicated to all women. The single was composed by Marbelle, Pipe Bueno and Pasabordo. In January 2020, Marbelle released the single "Adicta al Dolor," a song dedicated to women who have experienced emotional pain. The track was composed by Marbelle in collaboration with Pipe Bueno and the group Pasabordo.

== Discography ==
=== Albums ===
- Collar de Perlas (1996)
- Amor Sincero (1997)
- El Tumbo (1998)
- Hasta Que Te Conocí (2000)
  (tribute album to Juan Gabriel)
- Ahora (2005)
- Amor Sincero 2 (2010)
- Adicta al dolor (2020) (Single)

== Filmography ==
=== Television ===
- 2007: Marido a Sueldo
- 2010: Amor Sincero
