= Dann Visbal =

Colombian musician

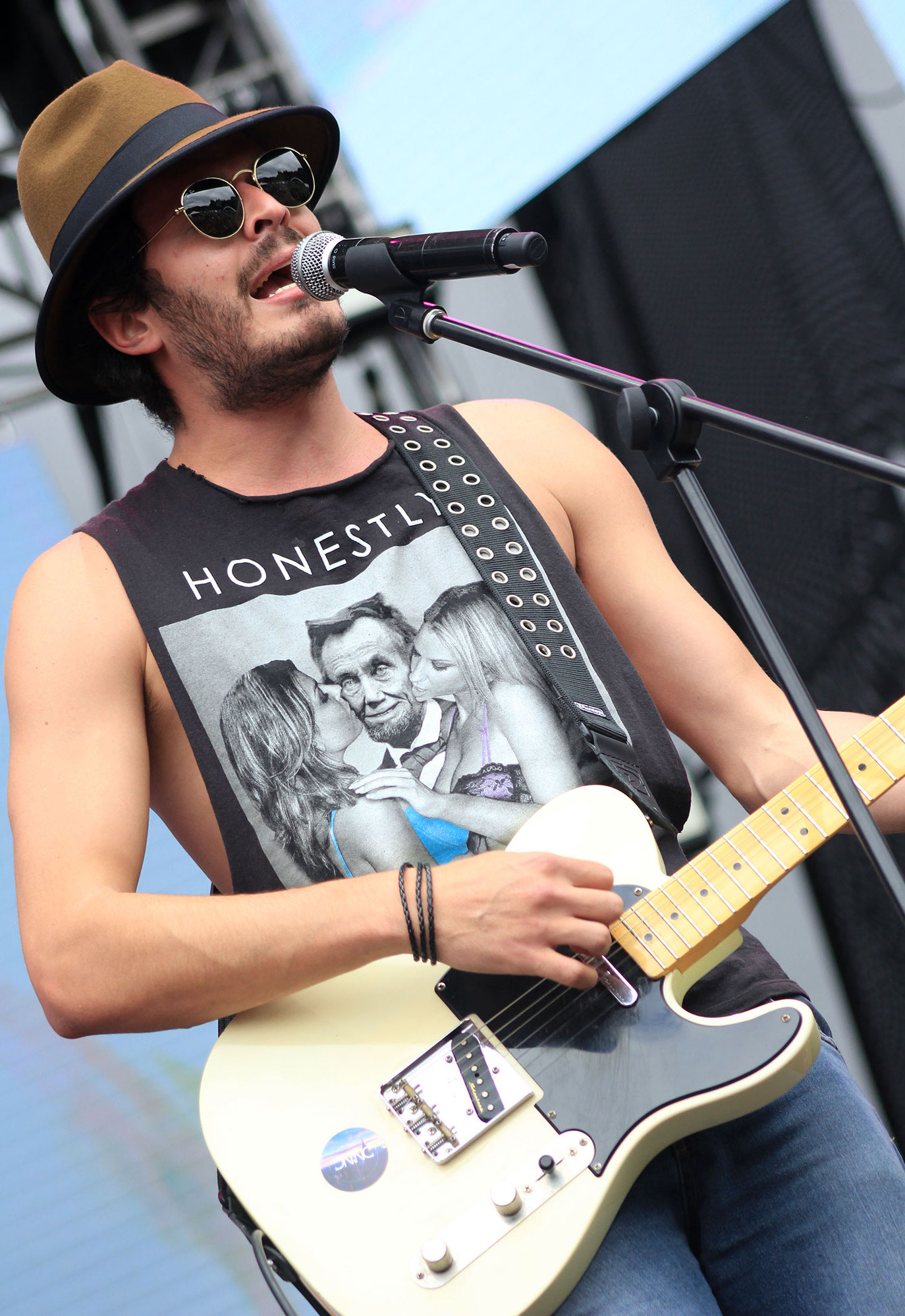
- Visbal performing at the Pop & Rock Fest
- Born: 7 November 1989 (age 36); Barranquilla, Atlantico, Colombia
- Occupation: Musician
- Musical career
- Genres: Rock, Pop Rock, Hard rock, Soul, Electronic
- Instruments: Vocals, guitar, drums, harmonica, keyboards, piano, synthesizer

Daniel Visbal Lara (born November 7, 1989), better known as Dann Visbal, is a Colombian musician and the lead singer of the electronic music band Bautté.

== Music career ==
Dann Visbal formed his first band "Navuro" at the age of 14. The band gained popularity in Barranquilla, Colombia, after recording Visbal's "Despedida". Two years later, Visbal created the short-lived band "Lokomotion."

When he was in his last year of school, he had an old friend who knew and respected his talent and proposed Dann to play with him in Los De Adentro, a famous rock band in Colombia, which Dann accepted and started playing with them. Dann played for a year, going on tours and playing as support band for several famous artists such as Juanes, Shakira and Duran Duran. At the age of 18 he moved to Buenos Aires, Argentina. There, he studied Music Production at the EMBA, and looked forward to his career and for big chances in his life. Soon the doors started to open in the crafty country as he was invited to several shows in different Buenos Aires' scenes and festivals in other cities around the country.

Dann created the band "Dominic" and started playing at famous night clubs in Buenos Aires such as Crobar, Pacha, The Roxy, among others. He also played on the American TV program, Wild on Latino, from E! Entertainment Television and Manifesto Rock TV. The band also recorded their first EP called "Of Love & Its Consequences", which was mixed and mastered by Santiago Convers along with his band Guitarist. On 11 December, the band released their first video clip on YouTube, called "Away" and got first place for most subscribed and most viewed channel at the YouTube Awards during the first month. In 2011 he was called up to play in Brazil with the North Eastern band "Duranbah".

Visbal moved to Bogota where he recorded his first LP, which was called "Gemini". Their first single, "Adios Buenos Aires", received a nomination on the Premios SHOCK as "Best Alternative Radio Song" and had a high rotation on the most important music channels in Latin America, such as MTV Latinoamerica, HTV, TeleHit, within others. They also received a nomination for the MTV Millennial Awards in 2015. In 2017, he received a Latin Grammy Award nomination as the Best Rock Song along with Rafa Bonilla. In 2018 he created an Electronic Rock band with famous drummer and actor Diego Cadavid, called Bautté. They released 4 singles and several remixes.
