= El Factor X =

- Created by: Simon Cowell
- Presented by: Andrea Serna (season 1-3); Karen Martínez (season 4); Laura González (season 5)
- Judges: Wilfrido Vargas; Juan Carlos Coronel; Marbelle; José Gaviria; Rosanna; Piso 21; Carolina Gaitán
- Original language: Spanish
- No. of seasons: 5

Original release
- Network: RCN TV
- Release: 2005 – present

El Factor X is the Colombian television music competition to find new singing talent. It is the based on the original British competition The X Factor, created by Simon Cowell. It is the first version produced in Latin America.

The show started screening in September 2005. The judges were Marbelle, singer Juan Carlos Coronel, and José Gaviria, a producer who has worked with stars like Carlos Santana. The winner was Julio César Meza. A second season followed in 2006 won by Francisco Villarreal and a third one, after a 2-year hiatus, in 2009 won by the duo Siam.

All the first three seasons and versions of the show have been hosted by the Colombian TV host and top model Andrea Serna, produced by Teleset and broadcast on RCN TV.

The show had two spin-offs. One was the one-year series El Factor X: Batalla de las Estrellas (meaning the Battle of the Stars). It was broadcast in 2006 and was won by Luz Amparo Álvarez.

The other-spin off was the series El Factor Xs for children up to 15 years. To date there have been three seasons with the same judges and presented by same host Andrea Serna. The first season was broadcast in 2006 and was won by Andres Hurtado, a second season in 2007 won by Camilo Echeverry, and a third in 2011 won by Shaira Selena Peláez.

== Season summary ==
"Juan Carlos Coronel"
"José Gaviria"
"Marbelle"
"Piso 21"
"Rosanna"
"Carolina Gaitán"

Season	Air date	Winner	Runner-up	Host(s)	Judges	Winning mentor
One	2005	Julio César Meza	Enygma	Andrea Serna	Marbelle; Juan Carlos Coronel; José Gaviria	Juan Carlos Caronel
Two	2006	Francisco Villarreal	Mario Marcelino Macuacé	Andrea Serna	Marbelle; Juan Carlos Coronel; José Gaviria	Marbelle
Three	2009	Siam	Raza Pana	Andrea Serna	Marbelle; Juan Carlos Coronel; José Gaviria	José Gaviria
Four	2021	José David Madero "Madeiro"		Karen Martínez; Mauricio Vélez	José Gaviria; Rosanna; Piso 21	José Gaviria
Five	2022	Heyner Usprung		Laura González	José Gaviria; Rosanna; Piso 21; Carolina Gaitán	Piso 21

=== Season 1 (2005) ===
Participants and their respective mentors were:

Jose Gaviria	Marbelle	Juan Carlos Coronel
16–24 years	Groups	25 and Over
Felipe Espinoza -	Sofia Pérez -	Paula Mantilla -
Mirabay Montoya	Andrea Piñeros	Juanita Delgado
Farina Pao Poucar Franco	Enigma	Julio César Meza
Yina Gallego	Sin Limite	Jackson Mosquera
Andres Monsalve	Las Hijas de Doña Diana	Estella Diaz
María Elisa Camargo	Las Gemelas Botero	Anabella Arbeláez

The winner of season one was Julio César Meza from solo-singers-aged-25+ category; the runners-up were Enygma (group made up of Ricardo García, Manuel Peña, Germán ‘Tito’ Núñez and Iván Peña) from vocal groups category and in third place was the controversial reggaeton-singer Farina (full name Pao Paucar Franco) from the solo-singers-aged-25-and-over category, famous for her quote Yo soy Farina! (from Spanish: I am Farina).

=== Season 2 (2006) ===
Marbelle	Juan Carlos Coronel	Jose Gaviria
16-24 Years	Groups	25 and Over
Francisco Villarreal	Ébano	Mario Marcelino Macuacé
Bryan Visbal	Natalia Y Marisol	Ángelo (Juan Carlos Ángel)
Juan Manuel	5 Latinos	Martha Trujillo
Juanita Pérez	Violeta	Walter Daniel Martínez
Lina María Uribe	Síntesis	Mary

The second season was won by Francisco Villarreal. He was unsuccessful contestant in the first season but had learned how to read in the intervening period. The runner up was Mario Marcelino Macuacé and third-place went to Angelo (full name Juan Carlos Ángel). Angelo was considered by many to be the favorite.

=== Season 3 (2009) ===
After a hiatus of 2 years in which no more seasons were held, the program returned in 2009 with its third season. Big publicity campaign was held and Canal RCN and Teleset S.A., producers of the third series visited various cities to collect talents from all over the country. Judge mentors and the participants were:

Juan Carlos Coronel	Jose Gaviria	Marbelle
16-24 Years	Groups	25 and Over
Jorge Luis Medina Mosquera	Siam	Edgardo José Escobar de Castro
Adriana Redondo Montero	Raza Pana	Juan Camilo Cordoba
Luz Ángela Perez Espitaleta	Son3	María Alejandra Diaz Huertas (Aleja)
Juan David Becerra (Juanda)	Sexto Sentido	Natalia María Sierra Sanchez

The competition was won by the group Siam, with Raza Pana another group as runner-up and Jorge (full name Jorge Luis Medina Mosquera) as third.

== El Factor X: Batalla de las Estrellas (2006) ==
A "Battle of the Stars" celebrity version of the show was held only once in 2006. The winner of the celebrity series was Luz Amparo Álvarez.

Series Summary

"Men" category
"Women" category
"Groups" category

Season	Air date	Winner	Runner-up	Host	Judges	Winning mentor
One	2006	Luz Amparo Álvarez	Valerie Domínguez	Andrea Serna	Marbelle; Juan Carlos Coronel; José Gaviria	José Gaviria

Jose Gaviria	Marbelle	Juan Carlos Coronel
Females	Males	Groups
Luz Amparo Álvarez	Jota Mario Valencia	Juan Y Andrés (Manuel Lenis and Andrés Sandoval)
Yaneth Waldman	Marcelo Cezán	Los Intocables (Carlos Giraldo, Diva Jessurum and ‘La Negra Candela’)
Lady Noriega	Lucas Velásquez	Fusión (Andrea Nocceti, Omar Murillo and Natalia Peralta)
Amalin de Hazbun	Carlos Calero	Olé (Martha Restrepo and Juan Rafael Restrepo)
Valerie Domínguez	‘Paché’ Andrade	El Cocuyo (Salpicón and Guillermo Díaz Salamanca)

== El Factor Xs ==
El Factor Xs is a popular children's version of the show that was made in early 2006. "Xs" stand for "extra small". A second season of "Xs" followed in 2007 and after a lapse of 4 years, a third season in 2011. The inaugural season was won by Andrés Camilo Hurtado, season 2 by Camilo Echeverry Correa, and the final season by Shaira Selena Pelaez.

=== Season summary ===
(All winners in bold)

"8-11 Years" category
"12-15 Years" category
"Groups" category

Season	Air date	Winner	Runner-up	Host(s)	Judges	Winning mentor
**One**	2006	**Andres Hurtado**	Huellas	Andrea Serna	Juan Carlos Coronel; Marbelle; José Gaviria	Juan Carlos Coronel
**Two**	2007	**Camilo Echeverry**	David	Andrea Serna	Marbelle; José Gaviria; Wilfrido Vargas	Jose Gaviria
**Three**	2011	**Shaira Selena Peláez**	Salome Camargo	Andrea Serna	Juan Carlos Coronel; Marbelle; José Gaviria	José Gaviria

==== El Factor Xs Season 1 (2006) ====
Juan Carlos Coronel	Marbelle	Jose Gaviria
8-11 Years	12-15 Years	Groups
**Andres Hurtado**	Jaider	Huellas
Aldemar	Mariana	Encanto
Nicolle	Oky	Dueto Armonico
Juanjo	Beto	RK Kids
Angie	Carlos	Piscis

==== El Factor Xs Season 2 (2007) ====
Marbelle	Jose Gaviria	Wilfrido Vargas
8-11 Years	12-15 Years	Groups
Danna	**Camilo Echeverry**	AN3
Salome	David	ARL
Mauro	Greeicy	Gaitambú
Ingrid	Yuliann	Manakín
Johan	Liyen	Impacto

==== El Factor Xs Season 3 (2011) ====
Jose Gaviria	Juan Carlos Coronell	Marbelle
8-11 Years	12-15 Years	Groups
**Shaira Selena Peláez**	Weider Figueroa	Benitez Brothers
Salome Camargo	Dylan Fuentes	Almas Gemelas
Laura Cardona	Luis Araque	Sol y luna
Sofia Ortiz	Nicolas Fuentes	Resplandor
Mateo Giraldo	Jesus Perez	Angeles de America
Samuel Zuluaga	Valeria Celis	Encanto

== See also ==
- List of Colombian TV Shows
- The X Factor
