= Aranzazu, Caldas =

- Municipality and town
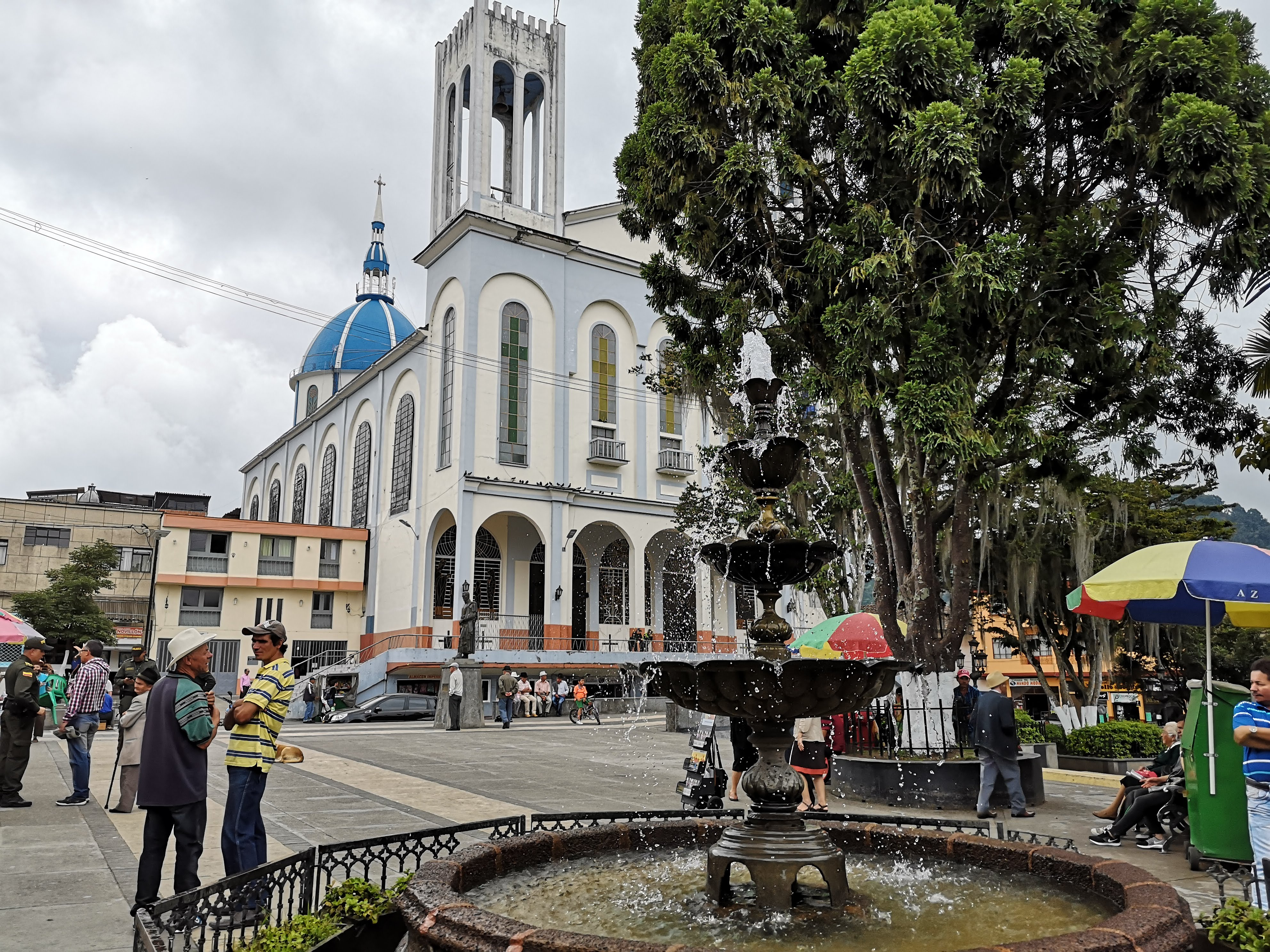

- Flag Coat of arms

- Location of the municipality and town of Aranzazu, Caldas in the Caldas Department of Colombia.

- Location in Colombia
- Coordinates: 5°16′17″N 75°29′27″W
- Country: Colombia
- Department: Caldas Department

Area
  - Total: 172 km^{2} (66 sq mi)
- Elevation: 1,920 m (6,300 ft)

Population (Census 2018)
  - Total: 9,854
  - Density: 57.3/km^{2} (148/sq mi)
- Time zone: UTC-5 (Colombia Standard Time)

Aranzazu (Spanish pronunciation: [aɾanˈsasu]) is a town and municipality in the Colombian Department of Caldas.
