= Elias Hämäläinen =

Finnish musician (born 1985)

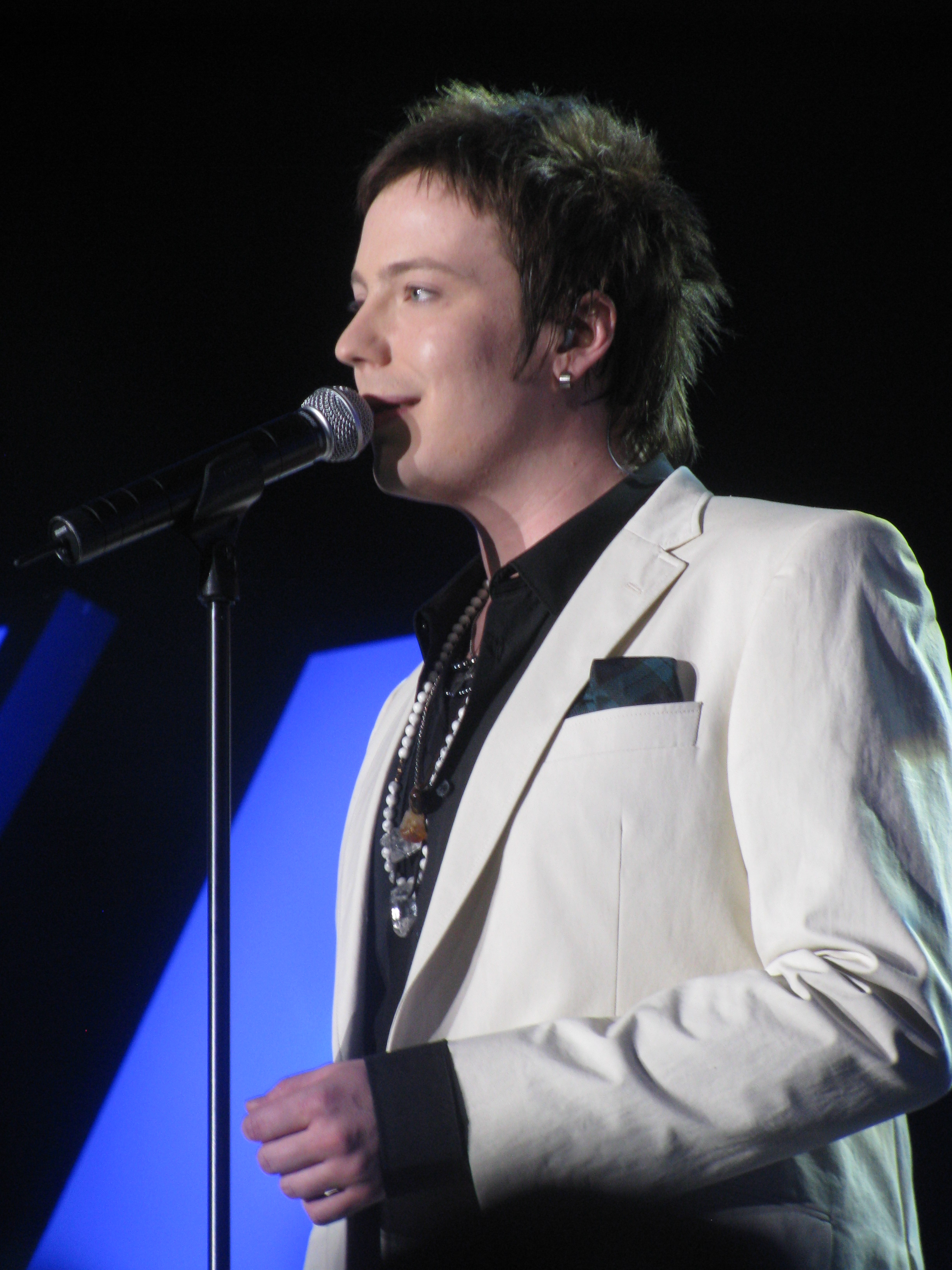

Background information
- Born: Elias Hämäläinen; 15 April 1985 (age 41); Finland
- Occupations: Musician, songwriter
- Instruments: Vocals, acoustic guitar
- Years active: 2010
- Website: eliashamalainen.fi/

Elias Hämäläinen (born 15 April 1985 in Finland) is a Finnish musician who won the first series of the Finnish X Factor on 16 May 2010. He received a 3-album recording contract with Sony Music. Before the competition, Elias made his living as a street musician in Helsinki, but was also lead-vocalist and guitarist in Gusto, a band playing rock with an acoustic guitar sound.

Elias Hämäläinen's parents were missionaries performing gospel music, and he toured many countries with them and his three older siblings, staying also for a while in the United States. Due to his international background, English is Hämäläinen's strongest language, and he mostly writes songs in English. The Finnish musician Jere Ijäs assisted him with the lyrics on his debut album, "Rakkaudesta ja pelosta" (About love and fear). Seven out of the ten tracks, both compositions and lyrics, are a result of this co-operation. Elias's brother Markus Hämäläinen has also contributed to some songs.

Since his X factor-victory, Elias has mostly done acoustic shows by himself or as a guitar duo with Gary Keskinen from the former Technicolour-band or his brother Markus. The record release tour contained some bigger shows with a band consisting mostly of Gusto-members. Elias performs his own material as well as diverse covers, e.g. "Slide" by Goo goo dolls, which was his audition song in X factor.

== Discography ==
=== Albums ===
- 27 October 2010: Rakkaudesta ja pelosta

=== Singles ===
- 20 September 2010: "Mies vailla virkaa"

Preceded by None	X Factor (Finland) Winner; 2010	Succeeded by Incumbent
