= The X Factor: Zhongguo Zui Qiang Yin =

Chinese television series

- Chinese: 中国最强音
- Created by: Simon Cowell
- Judges: Eason Chan Yik-shun; Lo Ta-yu; Zheng Jun; Zhang Ziyi
- Country of origin: China
- No. of seasons: 1
- No. of episodes: 7

Production
- Running time: 90 minutes

Original release
- Network: Hunan Television
- Release: April 19, 2013

The X Factor: Zhongguo Zui Qiang Yin (Chinese: 中国最强音; lit. 'China's strongest voice') is a Chinese version of the reality talent show The X Factor. It is broadcast on Hunan Television.

The first season debuted on April 19, 2013. It is hosted by Zhu Dan (朱丹) and He Jiong. Eason Chan Yik-shun, Lo Ta-yu, Zheng Jun, and Zhang Ziyi are the judges.

== Contestants ==
Zheng Jun's Team - Over 33s: 刘明辉 (Liu Minghui), 林军 (Lin Jun), 秦妮 (Qin Ni)

Eason Chan's Team - Groups: HOPE组合 (Hope), 墨绿森林 (Atrovirens Forests), 新声驾到 (New Voice)

Luo Ta-yu's Team - Ladies: 陈一玲 (Chen Yiling), 艾怡良 (Ai Yiliang), 刘瑞琦 (Liu Ruiqi)

Zhang Ziyi's Team - Boys: 曾一鸣 (Zeng Yiming), 尹熙水 (Yin Xishui), 金贵晟 (Jin Guicheng)

== Incidents ==
In the 2013 competition, Judge Ta-yu made harsh comments to one of the contestants for nearly 20 minutes. Ziyi was so upset with the criticisms, that an argument between her and Ta-yu occurred. The argument ended in Ziyi leaving her seat in tears.

== See also ==
- The X Factor: Ji Qing Chang Xiang
