= Vlasta Redl =

Czech folk musician (born 1959)

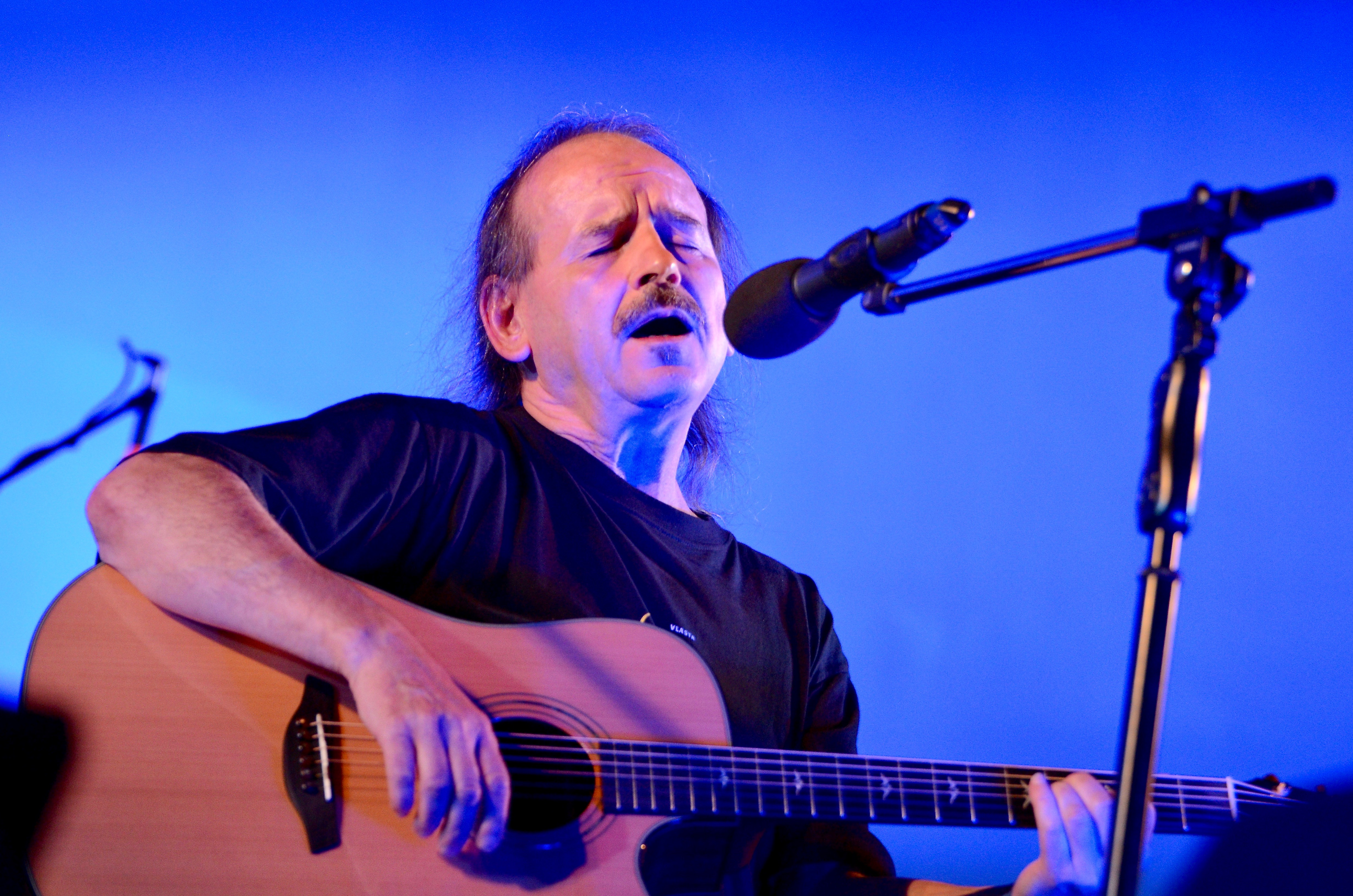
- Vlasta Redl in 2017

Background information
- Born: 14 April 1959 (age 67); Nový Jičín, Czech Republic
- Origin: Valašské Meziříčí, Czech Republic
- Genres: Folk, Beat Music
- Occupations: singer, lyricist, composer, guitarist
- Years active: 1984 - present
- Website: (in Czech)www.redl.cz

Vlasta Redl is a Czech folk musician.

== Musical career ==
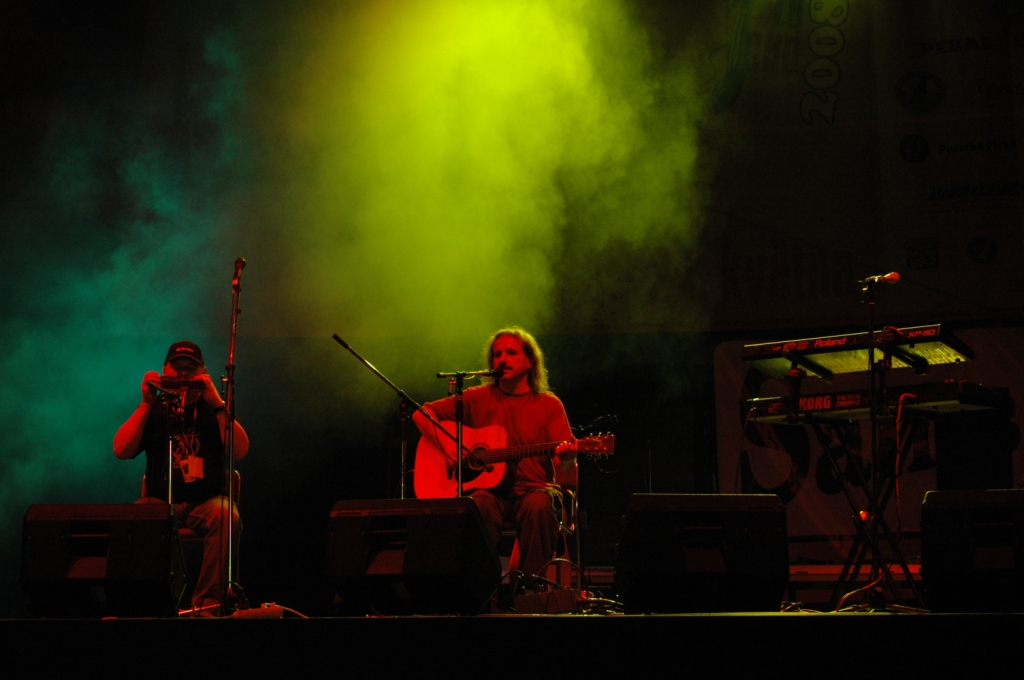
Czech folk musician Vlasta Redl, Lochotin 2008

After playing at dance events in Valašské Meziříčí, Redl joined the Zlín band AG Flek, beginning his career as a folk singer. He then joined the group Fleret, which performed many of the songs he composed. In 1996 he formed his own group, Skupina která se jmenuje Každý den jinak (The band that's called Something different every day).

== Discography ==
- 2006 Vlasta Redl, Slávek Janoušek a Jaroslav Samson Lenk – Barvy domova
- 2004 Vlasta Redl a KDJ – Dopisy z květin
- 2000 Vlasta Redl – Pecky téměř všecky
- 1998 Vlasta Redl & Každý den jinak
- 1997 Vlasta Redl o kolo zpět
- 1995 Zuzana Homolová – Slovenské Balady
- 1995 Vlasta Redl, Slávek Janoušek a Jaroslav Samson Lenk – Kde domov můj
- 1995 AG Flek – Dohrála hudba + 1
- 1994 Vlasta Redl – AG Flek & Hradišťan – Jiří Pavlica
- 1993 Fleret – Secondhand za hubičku
- 1992 Vlasta Redl – Staré pecky
- 1991 AG Flek – Tramtárie
- 1990 Vlasta Redl – Na výletě
- 1990 Vlasta Redl, Slávek Janoušek a Jaroslav Samson Lenk – Zůstali jsme doma
- 1989 AG Flek – Dohrála hudba
- 1988 Slávek Janoušek – Kdo to zavinil
- 1987 Samson & Máci – Pohoda
