= Bryan Visbal =

Colombian musician, singer and songwriter

Bryan Visbal (born August 9, 1985) is a Colombian musician, singer and songwriter who is the former vocalist of the band Los De Adentro (Those that are in).

== Biography ==
Bryan Visbal was born in New York City on August 9, 1985, the son of Martha Iglesias and Ricardo Visbal. Coming from a family well known in the city of Barranquilla, Colombia, in a musical group called "Colores del Tiempo", composed of all Visbal Rosales brothers.

== X Factor ==
Bryan Visbal together with his band "The Fotones" became part of the reality show in Colombia El Factor X. He got into the last 7 participants when he was eliminated. After 6 months he received a proposal to become the Lead singer of "Los de Adentro", which he accepted.

== Los de Adentro ==
In 2007 he entered to make part of the renowned Colombian rock band "Los de Adentro" with which performed a song called "Se Apaga el Silencio". Four of the songs were postulated the first place in the national broadcasters. The album was produced by the band at that time which consisted of Eliuth Martinez, Johann Daccarett and Bryan Visbal. The co-production on "Mira" consisted of Einar Scaff, creator of the fusion of rhythms with rock. Along with "Los de Adentro" released a second album as LDA, being a re-edition of the disc.

In 2010, Visbal left the band to pursue a solo career.

== 2010–present ==
Visbal is recording his album with producer Jose Madero Visbal, and is preparing for a national tour. His first single """Volverte A Ver""" is on Desde Cero.

== Discography ==
Title	Release date	Discograph
Se Apaga el Silencio (Colombia)	2008	Universal Music
