= Sisa Sklovská =

Slovak singer

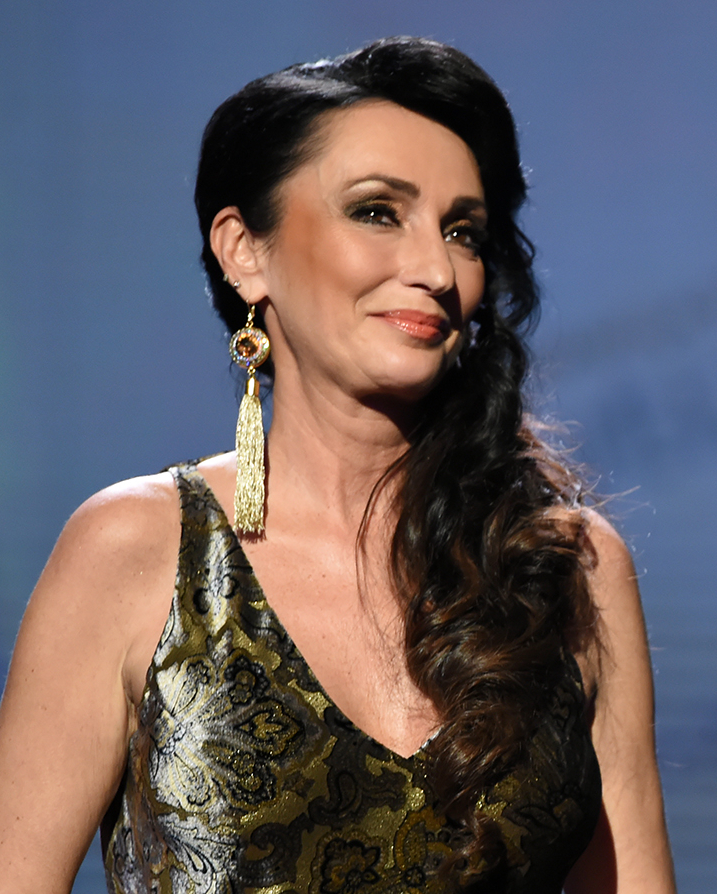
- Sisa Sklovská performing in 2016

Background information
- Birth name: Silvia Sklovská
- Born: 13 October 1965 (age 59)
- Origin: Žilina, Czechoslovakia
- Occupation: Singer
- Years active: 2000–present
- Labels: BMG Ariola; Global Music
- Website: sisasklovska.com

Sisa Sklovská (born 13 October 1965) is a Slovak singer. She studied at Academy of Performing Arts in Bratislava (VŠMU) and subsequently joined the Slovak National Theatre, where she performed for five years as a soloist. Sklovská was among the judges for the X Factor (Czech and Slovak series). Slovak president Ivan Gašparovič attended her wedding to Juraj Lelkes in January 2011.

== Discography ==
=== Studio albums ===
- 2000: Sisa
- 2003: Viem, čo chcem
- 2009: Kouzlem spoutaná
- 2010: Piesne vianočné (Christmas Songs) zlatá edícia
- 2010: Láska
- 2011: Pop Collection 2000–2010
