= X Factor (Italian TV series) season 8 =

X Factor
- Season 8
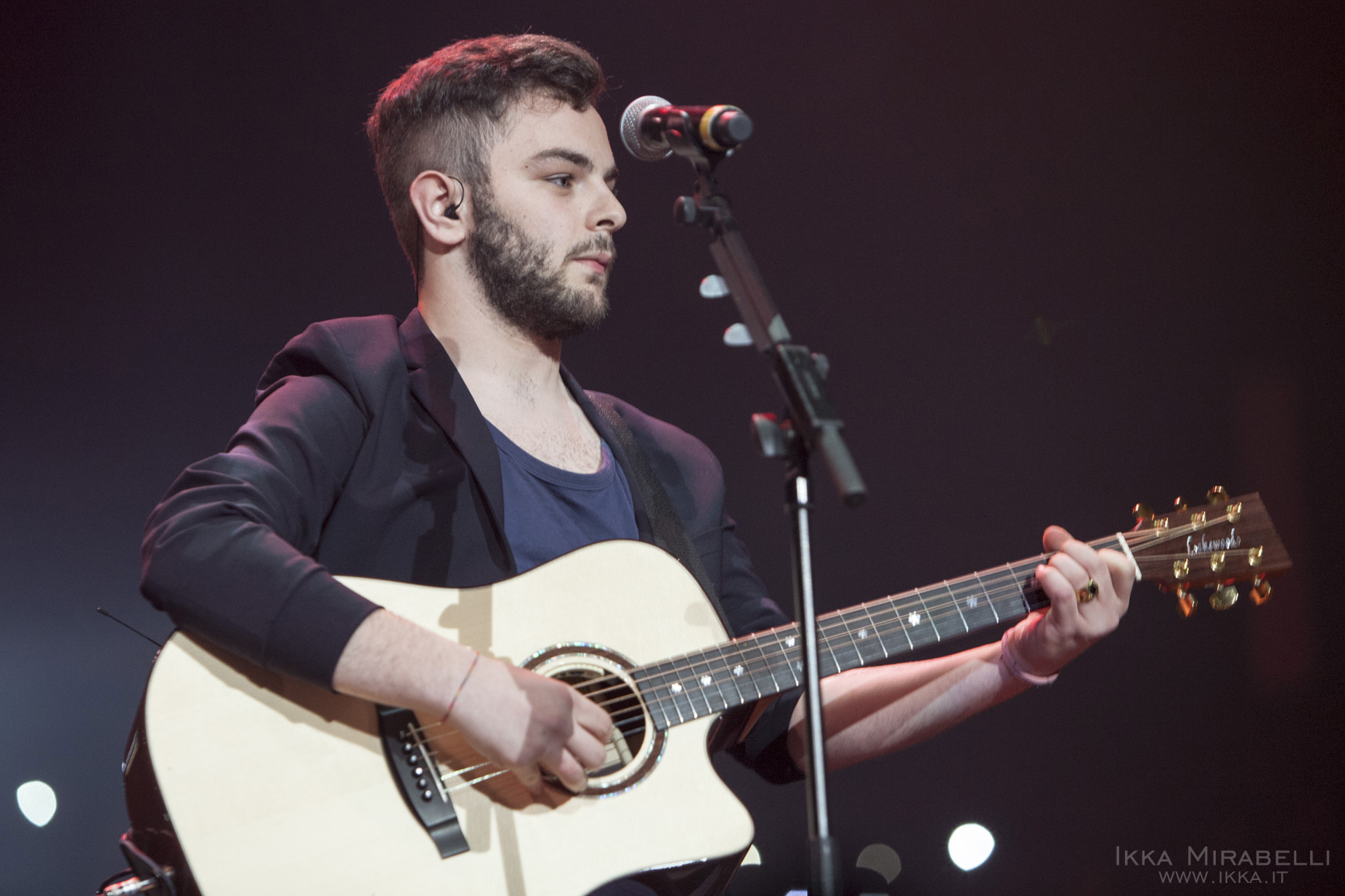
- Hosted by: Alessandro Cattelan (Sky Uno)
- Judges: Victoria Cabello; Mika; Morgan; Fedez
- Winner: Lorenzo Fragola
- Winning mentor: Fedez
- Runner-up: Madh
- Finals venue: X Factor Arena, Milan (Weeks 1-currently)

Release
- Original network: Sky Uno; Cielo
- Original release: 18 September – 11 December 2014

Season chronology
- ← Previous; Season 7 Next → Season 9

X Factor is an Italian television music competition to find new singing talent; the winner receives a € 300,000 recording contract with Sony Music. Before the start of the auditions process it was announced that Morgan and Mika would be confirmed as judges and mentors, whilst Victoria Cabello and Fedez have been chosen for replacing Simona Ventura and Elio in the role; also Alessandro Cattelan returned as host. The eighth season has been airing on Sky Uno since 18 September 2014.

Auditions for season 8 took place in Rome, Turin and Bologna in June 2014; bootcamp took place in Milan for two days, on 1 and 2 July. Unconfirmed rumors revealed that Mika will mentor the Over-25s, Fedez the boys, Cabello the girls and Morgan the groups; they selected their final three acts during judges' houses.

Lorenzo Fragola, a member of the category Boys and mentored by Fedez, was announced the winner of the competition on 11 December 2014. His winner's single, "The Reason Why", released at the end of the Semi-Final on 4 December, won a Gold Certification of sales.

== Cast ==
Season 8 Judges

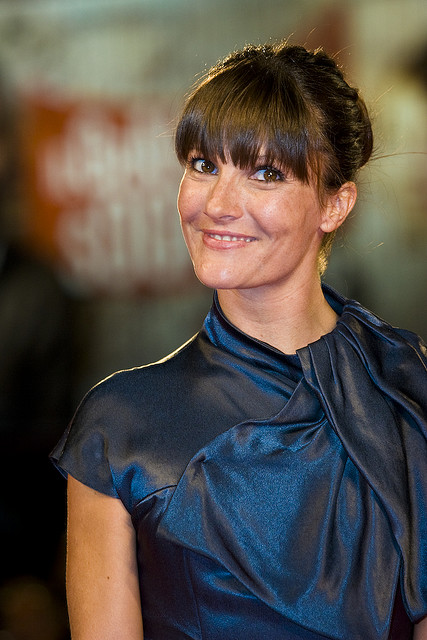
Victoria Cabello

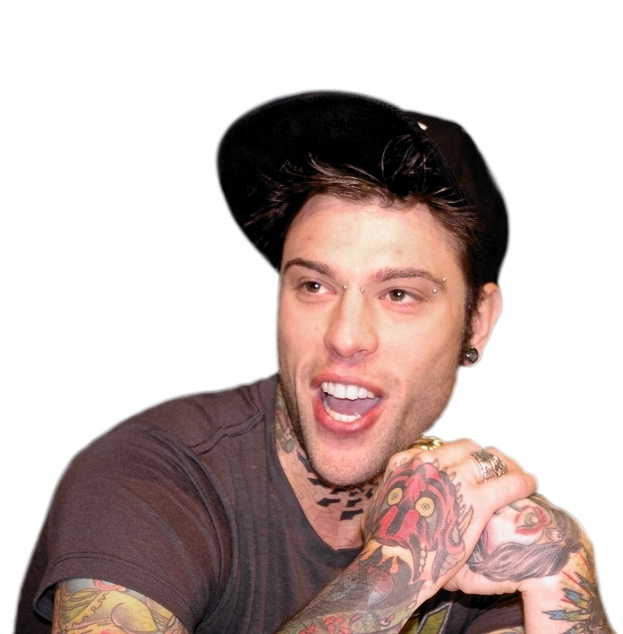
Fedez

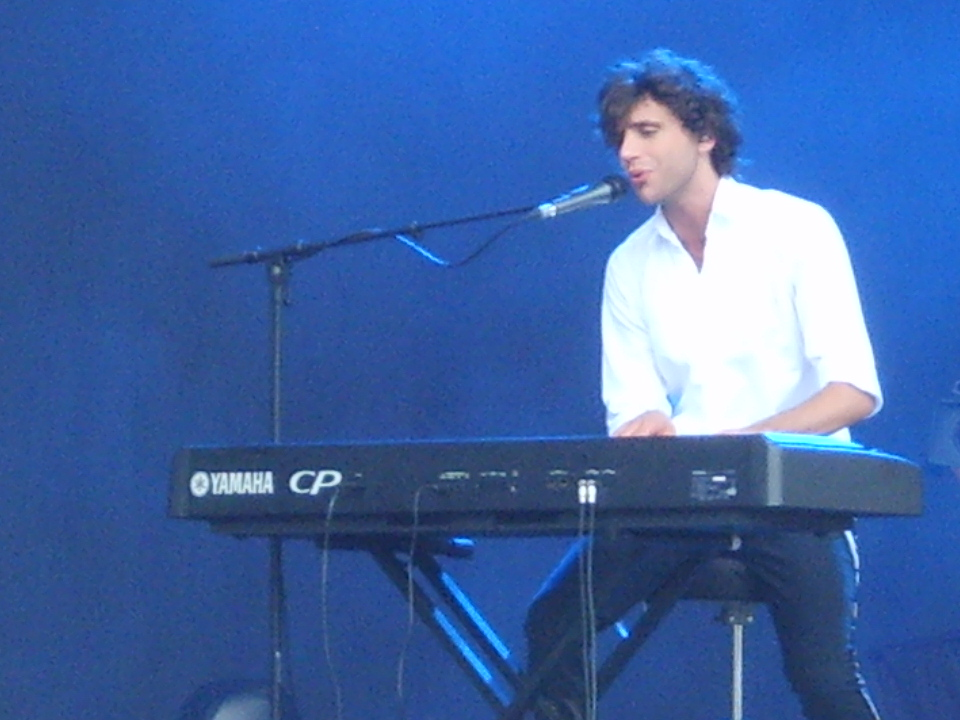
Mika

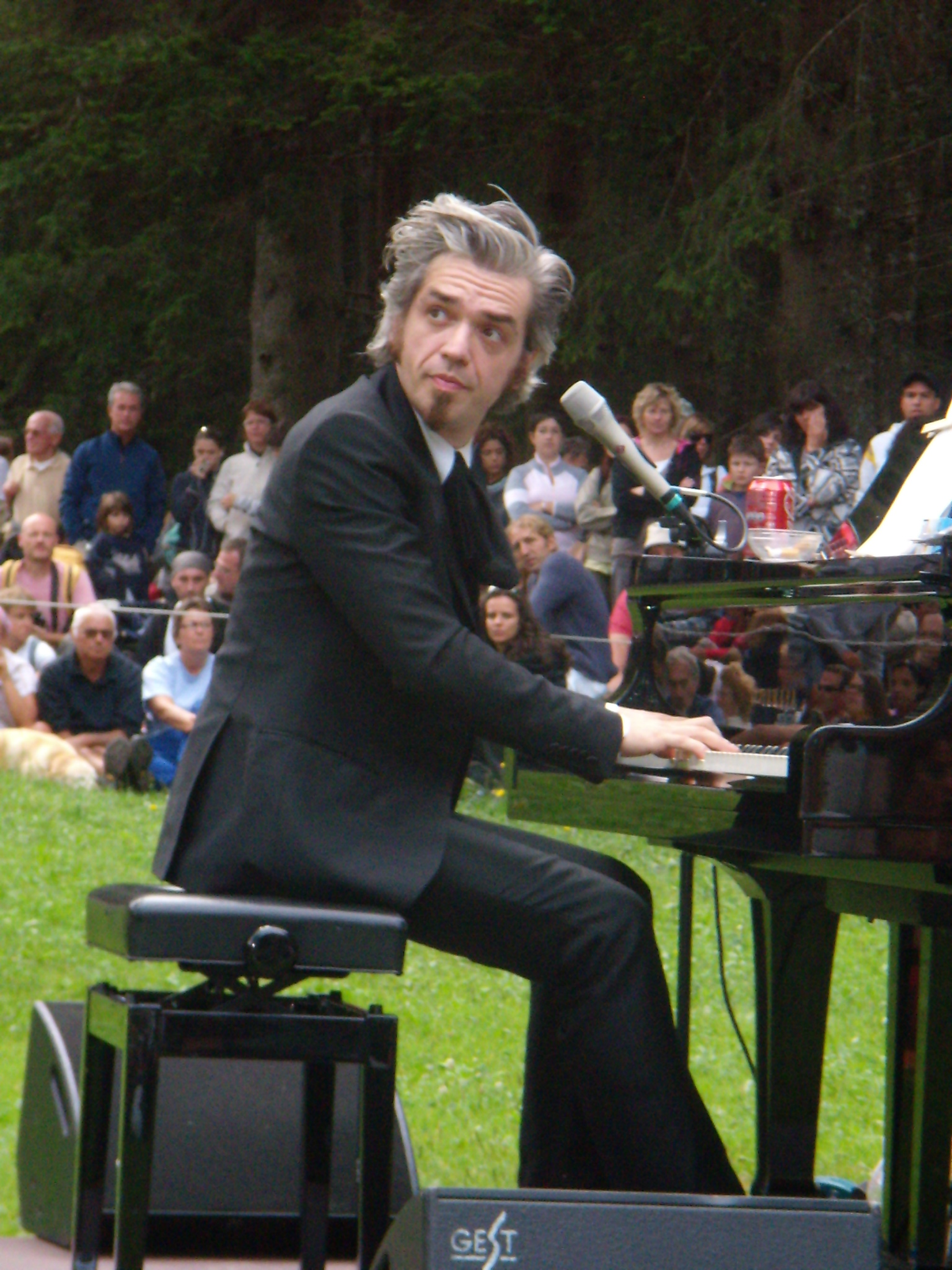
Morgan

Category	Mentor	Musical Producer
Under Girls (16-24)	Victoria Cabello	Gioni Barbera
Under Boys (16-24)	Fedez	Fausto Cogliati
Over 25+	Mika	Alessandro Raina
Groups	Morgan	Lele Battista

Vocal coaches: Paola Folli e Rossana Casale.

=== Applications and auditions ===
Cities that auditions and/or pre-auditions were held in.

A preliminary phase of auditions was held:

- at PalaLottomatica, Rome, from 10 to 12 May 2014;
- at Lingotto, Turin, from 24 to 26 May 2014.

The judges auditions was held:

- at Unipol Arena, Bologna, on 7 and 9 June 2014;
- at PalaLottomatica, Rome, from 21 to 22 June 2014.

The auditions were then broadcast on Sky Uno from 18 September to 2 October, and on Cielo from 21 September to 5 October.

=== Bootcamp ===
Bootcamp took place at Mediolanum Forum, Assago, over two days, on Tuesday 1 July and Wednesday 2 July; it was broadcast on 9 October on Sky Uno and on 12 October on Cielo. Before Bootcamp, all the contestants who passed the auditions, were divided into two groups: the first one passed directly to the Bootcamp, since it was made by singers who fully convinced the judges; the other one was made by singers who didn't fully convince the judges, thus they had to face the “Room Auditions”. These were held in the Forum; the ones who succeeded in the Room Auditions, passed to the Bootcamp. For the first time in Italy, besides the presence of spectators at the Bootcamp, to pick the six contestants from each category, the “Six Chair Challenge” was introduced: each judge has six chairs at their disposal and they can decide to make a contestant sit (thus passing them to the “Home Visit”) or not (eliminating them); if the chairs are all occupied, the judge of the specific category can decide to make a contestant stand up (eliminating them) and make the other sit on the chair. After the Bootcamp, 24 contestants passed to the Home Visit.

=== Judges' houses ===
The “Home Visit” is the final phase before the Live Shows. In this phase, the contestants who passed the Bootcamp had to perform one last time in front of their specific judge, in four different locations. At the end of this audition, the top twelve contestants were chosen.

The Home Visit took place in four different locations decided by each judge: Cabello chose London, Fedez chose Milan, Mika chose Motya and Morgan chose Vienna. Each judge was also helped by a guest to choose: The Bloody Beetroots for Cabello, Raphael Gualazzi for Fedez, Elio for Mika and Eugenio Finardi for Morgan. The Homevist took place around the end of July 2014.

Between the eliminated in this phase, those written in bold in the following chart were chosen by the judges for re-proposal. The four ones were then voted by the public who decided to bring Riccardo Schiara back in the competition during the second Liveshow. The twelve eliminated acts were:

- Boys: Dirty, **Riccardo Schiara**, Dario Guidi
- Girls: Giorgia Bertolani, **Carolina Faroni**, Maria Faiola
- 25+: Alessio Bersaglini, Jade Angiolina Canali, **Sarah Fargion**
- Groups: Fading Memories, Aula 39, **Les Babettes**

== Contestants and categories ==
Key:

– Winner
– Runner-up
– Third place

Category (mentor)	Acts			
Boys (Fedez)	Lorenzo Fragola	Madh	Leiner Riflessi	Riccardo Schiara
Girls (Cabello)	Vivian Grillo	Camilla Andrea Magli	Ilaria Rastrelli	
25+ (Mika)	Diluvio	Mario Gavino Garrucciu	Emma Morton	
Groups (Morgan)	Komminuet	Spritz for Five	The Wise	

== Live shows ==
=== Results summary ===
The number of votes received by each act were released by Sky Italia after the final.

Colour key

–	Contestant was in the bottom two/three and had to sing again in the final showdown
–	Contestant was in the bottom three but received the fewest votes and was immediately eliminated
–	Contestant received the fewest public votes and was immediately eliminated (no final showdown)
–	Contestant received the most public votes

Weekly results per contestant
Contestant	Week 1		Week 2		Week 3		Week 4		Week 5		Quarter-Final		Semi-Final		Final		
Contestant	Part 1	Part 2	Part 1	Part 2	Part 1	Part 2	Part 1	Part 2	Round 1	Round 2	Round 1	Round 2	Round 1	Round 2	Round 1	Round 2	Round 3
Lorenzo Fragola	—N/a	1st 30.60%	—N/a	1st 31.62%	—N/a	1st 31.17%	1st 30.74%	—N/a	1st 16.43%	1st 17.93%	2nd 17.83%	1st 21.26%	1st 24.01%	1st 24.63%	1st 31.83%	1st 37.70%	Winner; 51.74%
Madh	5th 9.97%	—N/a	5th 16.09%	—N/a	—N/a	3rd 19.37%	2nd 22.50%	—N/a	2nd 13.23%	3rd 13.48%	1st 18.42%	2nd 20.29%	2nd 19.46%	2nd 22.60%	2nd 26.84%	2nd 33.81%	Runner-Up; 48.26%
Ilaria Rastrelli	2nd 21.86%	—N/a	4th 18.11%	—N/a	4th 14.96%	—N/a	—N/a	3rd 20.89%	7th 9.89%	2nd 14.10%	5th 11.95%	5th 13.82%	4th 15.74%	4th 17.86%	3rd 24.88%	3rd 28.49%	Eliminated (final)
Mario Gavino Garrucciu	—N/a	2nd 27.88%	2nd 19.38%	—N/a	—N/a	2nd 22.05%	3rd 20.10%	—N/a	5th 11.11%	5th 11.82%	6th 11.46%	6th 13.29%	3rd 17.10%	3rd 19.70%	4th 16.45%	Eliminated (final)	
Emma Morton	1st 30.39%	—N/a	—N/a	2nd 24.62%	1st 21.60%	—N/a	—N/a	1st 23.89%	3rd 12.15%	6th 11.59%	4th 13.78%	4th 14%	5th 14.42%	5th 15.22%	Eliminated (semi-final)		
Leiner Riflessi	3rd 20.39%	—N/a	1st 22.03%	—N/a	2nd 21.53%	—N/a	—N/a	2nd 23.62%	4th 12.09%	7th 10.24%	3rd 15.42%	3rd 17.33%	6th 9.27%	Eliminated (semi-final)			
Komminuet	4th 11.60%	—N/a	—N/a	6th 6.56%	5th 13.27%	—N/a	—N/a	5th 15.15%	6th 9.95%	4th 12.14%	7th 11.15%	—N/a	Eliminated (quarter-final)				
Vivian Grillo	—N/a	3rd 15.28%	3rd 18.31%	—N/a	6th 12.45%	—N/a	4th 17.72%	—N/a	8th 8.46%	8th 8.71%	Eliminated (Week 5)						
Riccardo Schiara	Not in live show		—N/a	3rd 14.08%	3rd 16.92%	—N/a	—N/a	4th 16.45%	9th 6.59%	Eliminated (Week 5)							
Spritz for Five	—N/a	4th 11.53%	—N/a	5th 9.81%	—N/a	4th 14.96%	5th 12.45%	—N/a	Eliminated (Week 4)								
Camilla Andrea Magli	—N/a	5th 11.12%	—N/a	4th 13.31%	—N/a	5th 11.71%	Eliminated (Week 3)										
The Wise	—N/a	6th 3.58%	6th 6.08%	—N/a	Eliminated (Week 2)												
Diluvio	6th 5.80%	—N/a	Eliminated (Week 1)														
Sarah Fargion	Not in live shows				Not returned (Week 2)												
Final showdown	Diluvio, The Wise		The Wise, Komminuet		Vivian Grillo, Camilla Andrea Magli		Spritz for Five, Komminuet		Leiner Riflessi, Vivian Grillo		Komminuet, Mario Gavino Garrucciu		Emma Morton, Ilaria Rastrelli		No final showdown or judges' vote: results will be based on public votes alone		
Judges' vote to eliminate															No final showdown or judges' vote: results will be based on public votes alone		
Morgan's vote	Diluvio		The Wise		Camilla Andrea Magli		Spritz for Five		Leiner Riflessi		Mario Gavino Garrucciu		Emma Morton		No final showdown or judges' vote: results will be based on public votes alone		
Cabello's vote	Diluvio		The Wise		Vivian Grillo		Spritz for Five		Leiner Riflessi		Komminuet		Emma Morton		No final showdown or judges' vote: results will be based on public votes alone		
Mika's vote	The Wise		The Wise		Vivian Grillo		Komminuet		Vivian Grillo		Komminuet		Ilaria Rastrelli		No final showdown or judges' vote: results will be based on public votes alone		
Fedez's vote	Diluvio		The Wise		Camilla Andrea Magli		Komminuet		Vivian Grillo		Mario Gavino Garrucciu		Emma Morton		No final showdown or judges' vote: results will be based on public votes alone		
Eliminated	Dilvuio; 3 of 4 votes majority		The Wise; 4 of 4 votes majority		Camilla Andrea Magli; 2 of 4 votes Deadlock		Spritz for Five; 2 of 4 votes Deadlock		Riccardo Schiara; Public vote to save		Komminuet; 2 of 4 votes Deadlock		Leiner Riflessi; Public vote to save		Mario Gavino; Garrucciu; Public vote to save	Ilaria Rastrelli; Public vote to save	Madh; Public vote to win
Eliminated	Dilvuio; 3 of 4 votes majority		The Wise; 4 of 4 votes majority		Camilla Andrea Magli; 2 of 4 votes Deadlock		Spritz for Five; 2 of 4 votes Deadlock		Vivian Grillo; 2 of 4 votes Deadlock		Komminuet; 2 of 4 votes Deadlock		Emma Morton; 3 of 4 votes majority		Mario Gavino; Garrucciu; Public vote to save	Ilaria Rastrelli; Public vote to save	Lorenzo Fragola; Public vote to win

=== Live show details ===
==== Week 1 (23 October 2014) ====
- Group performance: Medley of famous songs performed by the twelve contestants ("Try" / "Wrecking Ball" / "Paparazzi" / "No Woman No Cry" / "Forever Young" / "With or Without You" / "Someone Like You" / "Penso Positivo" / "Happy Ending")
- Celebrity performers: Tiziano Ferro ("Senza Scappare Mai Più") and Robin Schulz & Lilly Wood and the Prick ("Prayer in C")

Contestants' performances on the first live show
Part 1
Act	Order	Song	Result
Emma Morton	1	"Blurred Lines"	Safe
Komminuet	2	"Air on the G String"	Safe
Leiner Riflessi	3	"What Goes Around...Comes Around"	Safe
Ilaria Rastrelli	4	"The Scientist"	Safe
Diluvio	5	"Alors On Danse"	Bottom two
Madh	6	"Take Care"	Safe
Part 2
Act	Order	Song	Result
Spritz For Five	7	"Just Can't Get Enough"	Safe
Mario Gavino Garrucciu	8	"E non andar più via"	Safe
Camilla Andrea Magli	9	"Toxic"	Safe
The Wise	10	"Giovanni Telegrafista"	Bottom two
Lorenzo Fagola	11	"Good Riddance (Time of Your Life)"	Safe
Vivian Grillo	12	"We Found Love"	Safe
Final showdown details
Act	Order	Songs	Result
Diluvio	13	"La Notte"	Eliminated
The Wise	14	"You've Got to Hide Your Love Away"	Safe

Judges' votes to eliminate

- Morgan: Diluvio – backed his own act, The Wise.
- Mika: The Wise – backed his own act, Diluvio.
- Fedez: Diluvio – considered him inappropriate for the show.
- Cabello: Diluvio – agreed with Fedez.

==== Week 2 (30 October 2014) ====
- Group performance: "Logico #1" (Cesare Cremonini and the contestants)
- Celebrity performers: Cesare Cremonini ("Logico #1") and ("Greygoose")

Wildcard

Act	Order	Song	Result
Riccardo Schiara	1	"Chandelier"	Returned
Sarah Fargion	2	"Gli Uomini Non Cambiano"	Not returned

Contestants' performances on the second live show
Part 1
Act	Order	Song	Result
Madh	1	"No Church in the Wild"	Safe
Mario Gavino Garrucciu	2	"Ricomincio da qui"	Safe
Ilaria Rastrelli	3	"Pumped Up Kicks"	Safe
The Wise	4	"I Will Survive"	Bottom two
Leiner Riflessi	5	"The First Cut Is the Deepest"	Safe
Vivian Grillo	6	"Doo Wop (That Thing)/Can't Take My Eyes Off You"	Safe
Part 2
Act	Order	Song	Result
Spritz For Five	7	"Bohemian Rhapsody"	Safe
Emma Morton	8	"I Can't Make You Love Me"	Safe
Riccardo Schiara	9	"All of Me"	Safe
Camilla Andrea Magli	10	"Splendido splendente"	Safe
Komminuet	11	"Come Undone"	Bottom two
Lorenzo Fagola	12	"Impossible"	Safe
Final showdown details
Act	Order	Songs	Result
The Wise	13	"Mykonos"	Eliminated
Komminuet	14	"Virtual Insanity"	Safe

Judges' votes to eliminate

- Morgan: The Wise
- Mika: The Wise
- Fedez: The Wise
- Cabello was not required to vote because there was already a majority, but confirmed she would have eliminated The Wise.

==== Week 3 (6 November 2014) ====
- Theme: Dance
- Celebrity performers: Charli XCX ("Boom Clap") and Kiesza ("Hideaway")
- Trivia: During the opening of the show, the host and the judges of the new season of Italia's Got Talent came on stage to promote it.

Contestants' performances on the third live show
Part 1
Act	Order	Song	Result
Ilaria Rastrelli	1	"Get Lucky"	Safe
Komminuet	2	"Emerge"	Safe
Leiner Riflessi	3	"If I Die Tomorrow"	Safe
Emma Morton	4	"Sing It Back"	Safe
Vivian Grillo	5	"Telephone/You Spin Me Round (Like a Record)"	Bottom two
Riccardo Schiara	6	"Follow the Sun"	Safe
Part 2
Act	Order	Song	Result
Spritz For Five	7	"A Fifth of Beethoven"	Safe
Mario Gavino Garrucciu	8	"Don't Leave Me This Way"	Safe
Madh	9	"Dancing on My Own"	Safe
Camilla Andrea Magli	10	"Miss You"	Bottom two
Lorenzo Fagola	11	"Sweet Nothing"	Safe
Final showdown details
Act	Order	Songs	Result
Vivian Grillo	12	"Starships"	Safe
Camilla Andrea Magli	13	"Summertime Sadness"	Eliminated

Judge's vote to eliminate

- Cabello: Vivian Grillo - after a moment of hesitation, considered Magli's growth more interesting.
- Mika: Vivian Grillo - agreed with Cabello's comments.
- Fedez: Camilla Andrea Magli - considered Grillo more interesting.
- Morgan: Camilla Andrea Magli - could not decide so chose to take it to deadlock.

With both acts receiving two votes each, the result went to deadlock and a new public vote commenced for 200 seconds. Camilla Andrea Magli was eliminated as the act with the fewest public votes.

==== Week 4 (13 November 2014) ====
- Theme: Tolerance (billed as: We are 1)
- Celebrity performers: Hozier ("Take Me to Church") and Fabi, Silvestri, Gazzè ("L'amore non esiste")
- Trivia: Songs assigned for this week suffered from censorship, talk about freedom of expression or are about controversial themes such as bullying or discrimination.

Contestants' performances on the fourth live show
Part 1
Act	Order	Song	Result
Mario Gavino Garrucciu	1	"Sugar Man"	Safe
Madh	2	"Same Love"	Safe
Spritz For Five	3	"Il gioco del cavallo a dondolo"	Bottom two
Vivian Grillo	4	"Like a Prayer"	Safe
Lorenzo Fagola	5	"Un Blasfemo"	Safe
Part 2
Act	Order	Song	Result
Riccardo Schiara	6	"Perfect Day"	Safe
Komminuet	7	"Je t'aime... moi non plus"	Bottom two
Ilaria Rastrelli	8	"I'm on Fire"	Safe
Emma Morton	9	"Strange Fruit"	Safe
Leiner Riflessi	10	"Canzone per gli artisti"	Safe
Final showdown details
Act	Order	Songs	Result
Spritz For Five	11	"Radioactive"	Eliminated
Komminuet	12	"Don't Tell 'Em"	Safe

Judges' votes to eliminate

- Morgan: Spritz For Five - abandoned the studio straight after he made his decision.
- Cabello: Spritz For Five - followed their mentor's decision.
- Mika: Komminuet - based on the final showdown performances.
- Fedez: Komminuet - could not decide so chose to take it to deadlock.

With both acts receiving two votes each, the result went to deadlock and reverted to the earlier public vote. Spritz For Five eliminated as the act with the fewest public votes.

==== Week 5 (20 November 2014) ====
- Theme: "Apocalypse Night" (double elimination)
- Celebrity performers: Francesco De Gregori ("La Donna Cannone") and Ed Sheeran ("Thinking Out Loud")
- Trivia: Two rounds, on the first, each contestant brought a one-minute-snippet of a song they had previously sung and there was a direct elimination; on the second, each contestant brought a song picked by their mentors and there was a Final Showdown between the two least voted contestants.

Also, Morgan who in the previous week stated he would abandon the show, came back as the fourth judge.

Contestants' performances on the fifth live show
Round 1
Act	Order	Song	Result
Leiner Riflessi	1	"The First Cut Is the Deepest"	Safe
Ilaria Rastrelli	2	"Can't Find My Way Home"	Safe
Komminuet	3	"Emerge"	Safe
Riccardo Schiara	4	"Lonely Boy"	Eliminated
Emma Morton	5	"Pop Porno"	Safe
Lorenzo Fagola	6	"Cosa sono le nuvole"	Safe
Mario Gavino Garrucciu	7	"E non andar più via"	Safe
Vivian Grillo	8	"Super Bass"	Safe
Madh	9	"No Church in the Wild"	Safe
Round 2
Act	Order	Song	Result
Lorenzo Fagola	10	"How to Save a Life"	Safe
Vivian Grillo	11	"All About That Bass"	Bottom two
Mario Gavino Garrucciu	12	"Ragazzo Mio"	Safe
Komminuet	13	"Sirene"	Safe
Madh	14	"Disparate Youth"	Safe
Ilaria Rastrelli	15	"Giudizi Universali"	Safe
Leiner Riflessi	16	"Fireflies"	Bottom two
Emma Morton	17	"Un'Estate Fa"	Safe
Final showdown details
Act	Order	Songs	Result
Vivian Grillo	18	"Do It like a Dude"	Eliminated
Leiner Riflessi	19	"When I Was Your Man"	Safe

Judges' votes to eliminate

- Cabello: Leiner Riflessi – backed her own act, Vivian Grillo.
- Fedez: Vivian Grillo – backed his own act, Leiner Riflessi.
- Morgan: Leiner Riflessi – felt Riflessi could be commended more outside the show.
- Mika: Vivian Grillo - felt Grillo was not at ease on stage but could not decide so chose to take it to deadlock.

With both acts receiving two votes each, the result went to deadlock and reverted to the earlier public vote. Vivian Grillo was eliminated as the act with the fewest public votes.

==== Week 6: Quarter-final (27 November 2014) ====
- Theme: Mentor's Choice (first round); "Light" (second round)
- Celebrity performers: Marco Mengoni ("Guerriero") and Fedez and Francesca Michielin ("Magnifico")
- Trivia: Two rounds, on the first, each contestant sang a song chosen by their mentors; on the second, each contestant sang a song chosen from the ones voted by the public on-line.

Contestants' performances on the sixth live show
Round 1
Act	Order	Song	Result
Leiner Riflessi	1	"I"	Safe
Ilaria Rastrelli	2	"Un senso"	Safe
Komminuet	3	"Black Widow"	Bottom two
Mario Gavino Garrucciu	4	"Un giorno credi"	Safe
Madh	5	"Ready or Not"	Safe
Emma Morton	6	"Walking on Broken Glass"/"We Are Golden"	Safe
Lorenzo Fragola	7	"Niente da capire"	Safe
Round 2
Act	Order	Song	Result
Madh	8	"Lights"	Safe
Emma Morton	9	"Un mare in luce"	Safe
Ilaria Rastrelli	10	"There Is a Light That Never Goes Out"	Safe
Lorenzo Fragola	11	"Light My Fire"	Safe
Mario Gavino Garrucciu	12	"Luci a San Siro"	Bottom two
Leiner Riflessi	13	"You Are the Sunshine of My Life"	Safe
Final showdown details
Act	Order	Songs	Result
Komminuet	14	"Love the Way You Lie"	Eliminated
Mario Gavino Garrucciu	15	"Freedom"	Safe

Judges' votes to eliminate

- Morgan: Mario Gavino Garrucciu - backed his own act, Komminuet.
- Mika: Komminuet - backed his own act, Mario Gavino Garrucciu.
- Cabello: Komminuet - said she always stood for Garrucciu.
- Fedez: Mario Gavino Garriucciu - could not decide so chose to take it to deadlock.

With both acts receiving two votes each, the result went to deadlock and a new public vote commenced for 200 seconds. Komminuet were eliminated as the act with the fewest public votes.

==== Week 7: Semi-final (4 December 2014) ====
- Group performance: "Counting Stars" (with Ryan Tedder)
- Celebrity performers: OneRepublic ("I Lived")
- Theme: Apocalypse Night: two contestants eliminated. First round: Original songs; Second round: Mentor's choice.

Contestants' performances on the sixth live show
Round 1
Act	Order	Song	Result
Madh	1	"Sayonara"	Safe
Mario Gavino Garrucciu	2	"All'Orizzonte"	Safe
Ilaria Rastrelli	3	"My Name"	Safe
Leiner Riflessi	4	"Tutto quello che ci resta"	Eliminated
Emma Morton	5	"Daddy Blues"	Safe
Lorenzo Fragola	6	"The Reason Why"	Safe
Round 2
Act	Order	Song	Result
Lorenzo Fragola	7	"A-Punk"	Safe
Ilaria Rastrelli	8	"Nothing Compares 2 U"	Bottom two
Mario Gavino Garrucciu	9	"Hey Ya!"	Safe
Madh	10	"Flyover"	Safe
Emma Morton	11	"Love Is a Losing Game"	Bottom two
Final showdown details
Act	Order	Songs	Result
Ilaria Rastrelli	12	"The House of the Rising Sun"	Safe
Emma Morton	13	"I'm a Fool to Want You"	Eliminated

Judges' votes to eliminate

- Cabello: Emma Morton - backed her own act, Ilaria Rastrelli.
- Mika: Ilaria Rastrelli - backed his own act, Emma Morton.
- Fedez: Emma Morton - gave no reason, but said he was hoping for a deadlock since the decision was too hard.
- Morgan: Emma Morton - said he had always supported Rastrelli.

==== Week 8: Final (11 December 2014) ====
- Theme: Celebrity Duets (Round 1); Original Songs (Round 2); Own Choice (Round 3; billed as My Song)
- Group performance: Mika, the Finalists and the ex-contestants (Good Guys and Happy Ending)
- Celebrity performers: Chiara (Un Giorno di Sole), Saint Motel (My Type), David Guetta & Sam Martin (Dangerous), Tiziano Ferro (La differenza tra me e te, Senza scappare mai più, La fine)

Contestants' performances on the final live show
Round 1
Act	Order	Song	Result
Madh	1	"Moon" (with Malika Ayane)	Safe
Mario Gavino Garrucciu	2	"La Notte" (with Arisa)	4th Place
Lorenzo Fragola	3	"Sei nell'anima" (with Gianna Nannini)	Safe
Ilaria Rastrelli	4	"Sere nere" (with Tiziano Ferro)	Safe
Round 2
Act	Order	Song	Result
Lorenzo Fragola	5	"The Reason Why"	Safe
Ilaria Rastrelli	6	"My Name"	3rd Place
Madh	7	"Sayonara"	Safe
Round 3
Act	Order	Song	Result
Lorenzo Fragola	8	"Rewind"	Winner
Madh	9	"Heartbeat"	Runner-Up
