= Madh (singer) =

- Born: Marco Cappai; 13 November 1993 (age 32); Carbonia, Sardinia, Italy
- Genres: Moombahton; trap; reggae
- Occupations: Singer; rapper; songwriter
- Instrument: Vocals
- Years active: 2012–present (currently on hiatus)
- Labels: Newtopia; SEMS Music

Marco Cappai (born 13 November 1993 in Carbonia, Sardinia), known by his stage name Madh, meaning "my advice doesn't help", is an Italian singer, rapper and songwriter. He rose to fame in 2014, at the eighth season of the Italian edition of X Factor. His debut single, "Sayonara", was performed for the first time during the semi-finals of the competition. Also included in the extended play with the same name, the single reached the second spot of the Italian Singles Chart, and it was certified platinum by the Federation of the Italian Music Industry. In 2018 he deleted all of his content on Instagram and went on hiatus.

== Early life ==
Marco Cappai was born on 13 November 1993 in Carbonia, a comune in the former province of Carbonia-Iglesias (now province of South Sardinia), in Sardinia, Italy, where he also spent childhood.

== Music career ==
=== 2011–2014 ===
In 2011, Madh began creating songs with his brother. In 2012, he met some music publishers and record producers, and decided to found an independent label, the SEMS Music. He started self-producing video clips and uploading them on YouTube and on other various platforms. At the start of his musical career, he performed in clubs, bars and disco clubs in Sardinia. He won the first prize of a traditional Sardinian contest "Corrida Sulcis".

=== 2014: The X Factor ===
In June 2014 in Rome, Madh auditioned as a solo candidate for the eighth season of the Italian edition of The X Factor. In front of Italian judges Fedez, Mika, Morgan and Victoria Cabello, he performed the alternative song version Mad World of Gary Jules; in "bootcamp", he performed Enjoy the silence (Depeche Mode). In July 2014 in Milan, at "homevisit" with the song Exodus (MIA), he qualifying for the "Men Under 24" category, captained by Fedez. From 23 October 2014 to 11 December 2014, during the "live show" in Milan, Madh performed: Take Care (Drake), No Church in the Wild (Jay Z, Kanye West ft. Frank Ocean), Dancing on My Own (Robyn), Same Love (Macklemore & Ryan Lewis ft. Mary Lambert), Disparate Youth (Santigold), Ready or Not (Fugees), Lights (Ellie Goulding), Flyover (Asian Dub Foundation), Heartbeat (Nneka).

== Musical style and influences ==
His passion and love for music have been influenced by the Eastern culture and philosophy. Five of the most important songs of his life are: "Love Is A Losing Game" and "You Know I'm No Good" (Amy Winehouse), "Redemption Song" (Bob Marley), "Ready Or Not" (Fugees), Exodus (MIA).

== Discography ==
=== Studio albums ===
List of studio albums, with selected chart positions and certifications
Title	Album details	Peak chart positions	Certifications
Title	Album details	ITA	Certifications
Madhitation	Released: 10 July 2015; Label: Sony BMG; Formats: CD, digital download	5	

=== EPs ===
List of extended plays, with selected chart positions and certifications
Title	Album details	Peak chart positions	Certifications
Title	Album details	ITA	Certifications
Sayonara	Released: 12 December 2014; Label: Sony BMG; Formats: CD, digital download	14	

=== Singles ===
List of singles, with chart positions and certifications, showing year released and album name
Single	Year	Peak chart positions	Certifications	Album or EP
Single	Year	ITA	Certifications	Album or EP
"Sayonara"	2014	2	FIMI: Platinum	Sayonara
"Gong" (Madh featuring The Strangers)	2015	—		Madhitation
"River"	2015	—		Madhitation
"Powerlife"	2016	—		Non-album single
"King of the Night"	2017	—		Non-album single
"Imma Kill'em with a Rhyme"	2017	—		Non-album single
"Get Mad"	2017	—		Non-album single
"Tennis Ball"	2017	—		Non-album single
"La La La"	2017	—		Non-album single
"Vertigo"	2017	—		Non-album single
"Avvoltoi"	2022	—		Non-album single
"Veleno"	2022	—		Non-album single

=== Album appearances ===
List of other album appearances
Contribution	Year	Album
"Have Yourself a Merry Little Christmas" (with Lorenzo Fragola, Leiner and Riccardo Schiara)	2014	X Factor Christmas 2014
"Blurred Lines" (Emma Morton feat. Madh)	2014	Daddy Blues
"Fakeness" (Baby K feat. Madh)	2015	Kiss Kiss Bang Bang

=== Music videos ===
Title	Year	Director(s)
"Sayonara"	2014	Mauro Russo
"Gong"	2015	Mirko De Angelis
"River"	2015	Mauro Russo
"Powerlife"	2016	Alessio Russo
"King of the Night"	2017	Alessio Russo
"Imma Kill 'Em with a Rhyme"	2017	Alessio Russo
"Get Mad"	2017	Alessio Russo
"Vertigo"	2017	Alessio Russo
