= Halle Mordu =

Halle
- Also known as: Halle
- Born: Halle Grace Ihmordu; Edo State, Nigeria
- Genres: Afro pop music, reggae, dancehall
- Occupations: Singer, songwriter, dancer, actress
- Years active: 2004–present
- Labels: N3rd Records theMedia 360 Company
- Website: hallemordu.com

Halle (born Halle Grace Ihmordu; December 17) is a Nigerian singer-songwriter, dancer and actress currently signed to N3rd Records.

== Career ==
In 2008 she starred in her first drama movie Relentless (2008–2009) the movie which was later released in 2010 (at the BFI London Film Festival The movie which also got screened at the 2012 New York African Film Festival and also at the Film Club, Nigeria in 2012. ), becoming her first; the drama also stars Gideon Okeke, Nneka Egbuna, Jimmy Jean-Louis and Tope Oshin Ogun, co-produced by Andy Amadi Okoroafor, set in Freetown, Sierra Leone and Lagos, Nigeria.

Before becoming an actress, Halle, started dancing and she entered several dance competitions, finishing up as the Winner of Channel O Dance Africa Competition, and the last female standing at the Maltina Dance Hall (2008). In 2012 she debuted with her first single Falling in Love the song was positively received and also criticized by music lovers, then she went for a brief hiatus, giving it her 101% she continued honing her skills, she added another single to her catalog Na Na Na, not leaving anything out she rolled-out Dutty Shower in 2013.

Just like the other years, 2014 was an exception, she got signed to A.N.I Entertainment, in the same year she licensed all her musical works to Soundcore Media Limited who distributed for her and in late 2014 she released her first single Halle Baby under the label, the song enjoyed airplay's on radio stations in Nigeria, Internet Radio in UK and USA and hype's on local media; Newspapers, Entertainment Magazine's. Not resting in her oars Halle followed it up with Only You and Freaky Loving

As a professional Dancer, Halle has represented her country Nigeria in several dance competitions in South Africa and USA. Also as a performer, she has graced stages like The Calabar Festival, Star Trek, Coke Studio Africa and many more. Also in 2014, Halle was also nominated for City People Entertainment Awards in the Best New Female Act Category.

In 2015, things where no longer the way they used to between Halle and her record label A.N.I Entertainment and so she parted ways with the entertainment outfit. In early May 2015 after the split-out from her record label, she joined Soltesh Iyere's record label N3rd Records (a subsidiary of theMedia 360 Company) and she made a statement of intent in the Nigerian Music Industry with a single Another Day the song which serenades a special guy features Nigeria's Number one dance-hall artist Patoranking as the guy. Halle is all about the process, the singer-songwriter understands that less is usually more.

She and Idia Aisien are both brand ambassadors of 9janimi Channel, a music/movie streaming service since 2010.

=== Singles ===
- 2008: "Hallelicious"
- 2012: "Falling in Love"
- 2013: "Na Na Na"
- 2013: "Dutty Shower"
- 2014: "Only You"
- 2014: "Freaky Loving"
- 2014: "Halle Baby"
- 2015: "Another Day" Feat. Patoranking
- 2015: "Halle Baby (Remix)" Feat. TeeJay

== Filmography ==
Feature films
Year	Title	Role	Notes
2010	Relentless	Fatima	

== Awards and nominations ==
Year	Award	Category	Title	Result
2014	City People Entertainment Awards	Best New Female Act	Halle Baby	Nominated
