= Music Republic Records =

Record label

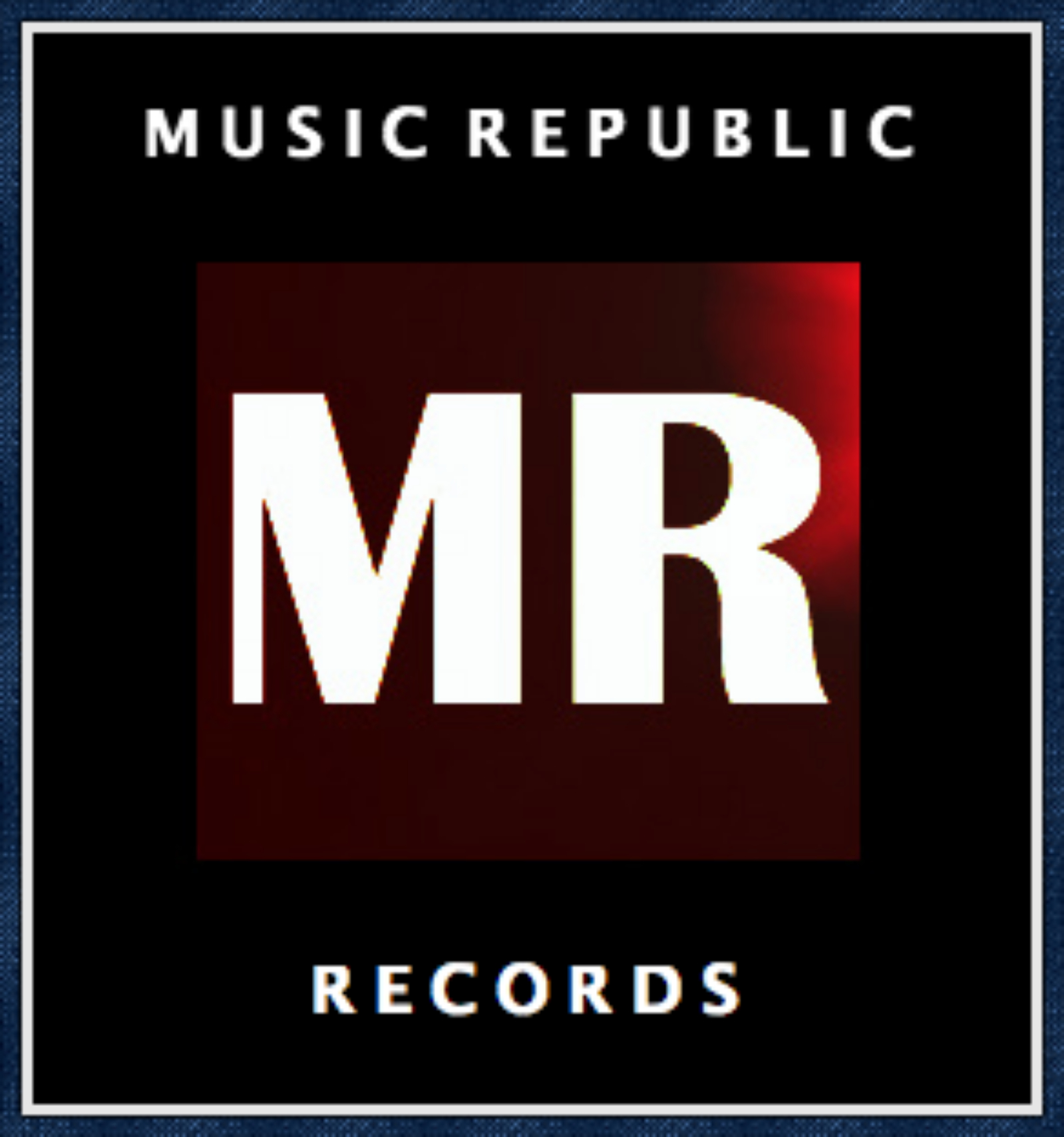
- Founded: 2009 - present
- Founder: Clef nite
- Status: Active
- Distributor: Tate Music Group
- Genre: World/Pop/Fusion/Jazz/R&B
- Country of origin: United States
- Location: Boston, MA
- Official website: musicrepublicrecords.com

Music Republic Records is an American independent record label owned and operated by Nigerian classical guitarist and singer Victor Chukwunonso Nite Jr., also known as Clef nite. Nite founded Music Republic Records in 2009 in Boston, Massachusetts to promote musical genres including Afro-Pop, Folk, World Music, and Soul, and the artists who create and perform this type of music.

== History ==
Music Republic Records started operations in 2014 with two projects. Clef nite’s tribute to Boston after the 2013 Boston Marathon bombing “Boston Song” marked his songwriting debut and the release of the Grace Project was a remix collection of popular gospel songs featuring Adia Oshikoya, Clef nite, and Ashley T. Lewis. MRR debuted Afro-Soul artist Tarrah in early 2015 and plans to release new EP’s in the summer of 2015 while considering adding more artists.

As of 2015, MRR promotes the musical talents of artists Clef nite, Tarrah, and Ms Ugonna, and collaborates with student artists at Berklee College of Music.
