= Relentless (2010 film) =

Nigerian drama film

- Film poster
- Directed by: Andy Amadi Okoroafor
- Written by: Andy Amadi Okoroafor
- Produced by: Aaron Allred; Elise Jalladeau; Isolde Pringiers; Andy Amadi Okoroafor
- Starring: Gideon Okeke; Nneka Egbuna; Jimmy Jean-Louis; Tope Oshin Ogun
- Cinematography: Javier Arrontes
- Edited by: Octavio Rodriguez
- Music by: Arnaud Boivin
- Production company: Clam Films
- Release date: 13 October 2010
- Running time: 95 minutes
- Countries: Nigeria; Germany; France
- Language: English

Relentless is a 2010 Nigerian drama film, co-produced and directed by Andy Amadi Okoroafor; it stars Gideon Okeke, Nneka Egbuna, Jimmy Jean-Louis and Tope Oshin Ogun. It was released on 13 October 2010 at the BFI London Film Festival, and was positively received; mostly praised for its cinematography and soundtrack.

The film which is set in Freetown and Lagos, narrates the story of Obi (Gideon Okeke), a Nigerian peacekeeping soldier who has been deployed to war-torn Sierra Leone. Obi's world is crushed after Blessing, a Sierra Leonean woman whom Obi loves, is mutilated by a gang of child soldiers and he's forced to kill her in order to put her out of pain and misery. He eventually returns to Lagos after the war, and tries to reintegrate himself into his community; in the process, he finds solace in the arms of a prostitute, Honey (Nneka Egbuna) who may help him forget his haunting past and lead him to self-discovery.

== Cast ==
- Gideon Okeke as Obi
- Nneka Egbuna as Honey
- Jimmy Jean-Louis as Candidate
- Tope Oshin Ogun as Funmi
- Ropo Ewenla as Ola
- Jibola Dabo as Alaki
- Toyin Oshinaike as
- Aloba Taiwo as
- Halle Mordu as Fatima
- Usiwoma Joshua as Gabriel

== Production ==
Okoroafor, the director states: "This is a film that hopefully will make you laugh, cry, travel, escape but most specially, it will make you think about contemporary Africa". The film was in production for four years.

=== Music and soundtrack ===
Relentless: Soundtrack Collection

Soundtrack album by Philippe Mallier & Pascal Morel
- Released: 2010
- Genre: Film soundtrack
- Length: 1:43:04
- Labels: Shining Music, Copyright Control
- Producer: Arnaud Boivin

The music score for the film was produced by Arnaud Boivin. Original score was composed by Philippe Mallier and Pascal Morel, while the soundtrack features artists such as: Ade Bantu, Tony Allen, Oranmiyan, Nneka, General Pype and Keziah Jones.

==== Track listing ====
No.	Title	Singer(s)	Length
1.	"Hustler"	Tony Allen	13:01
2.	"Champion"	General Pype	6:08
3.	"No Accommodation in Lagos"	Tony Allen	12:07
4.	"Afro Disco Beat"	Tony Allen	10:29
5.	"Out Of Space"	Nneka, DJ Farhot	4:08
6.	"African Border"	Ade Bantu, Patrice	4:38
7.	"Yoruba Girl (Moje Dodo)"	Kuku	4:37
8.	"Lovely Thing"	Nneka, DJ Farhot	4:01
9.	"Dreams keep my frown away"	Kuku	3:56
10.	"Troway your sorrow"	Oranmiyan	4:40
11.	"The same blood"	Tony Allen	8:13
12.	"Respect Yaself"	Nneka, Oranmiyan	3:29
13.	"Show them love"	Ade Bantu, African China	2:28
14.	"I’m waiting"	Ade Bantu, Nneka	4:31
15.	"Get together"	Tony Allen	5:56
16.	"Sign and Wonda (Chelu)"	Ezelle	4:32
17.	"Won’t you stay"	Keziah Jones	3:04
18.	"Honey's Theme"	Philippe Mallier, Pascal Morel	1:40
19.	"Obi's Theme"	Philippe Mallier, Pascal Morel	1:26
Total length:			1:43:04

== Release ==
The film was released on 13 October 2010 at the BFI London Film Festival. It was also screened at the 2012 New York African Film Festival and also at the Film Club, Nigeria in 2012.

== Reception ==
The film was positively received; it was mostly commended for its cinematography and soundtrack. Wendy Okoi-Obuli of "Shadow and Act" commended the cinematography, Okeke's performance and the music. She described the film as "art house" and concluded by stating: "Relentless is a welcome and refreshing take on the exploration of contemporary Nigeria in film". Bunmi Ajiboye praised the cinematography of the film, its music, production design, characterization and its apt portrayal of Lagos. She particularly praised Okeke's performance and concluded: "Watching the movie, you may not understand why the rationale behind certain actions are not clearly defined, yet you can't help feeling it was more a product of artistic necessity than cinematographic cock-up. Relentless is Okoroafor's first shot at feature length movie and it is a brilliant debut as the film speaks for itself;" Those who opt out of seeing this film "will be depriving themselves of a great opportunity to see how Nigerian cinema is evolving". Ade Bantu comments: "...I was highly impressed; Relentless is the ultimate Lagos movie, a well executed art-house piece of cinematic beauty".

== See also ==
- List of Nigerian films of 2010
