= Nneka (singer) =

Nigerian singer, songwriter and actress (born 1980)

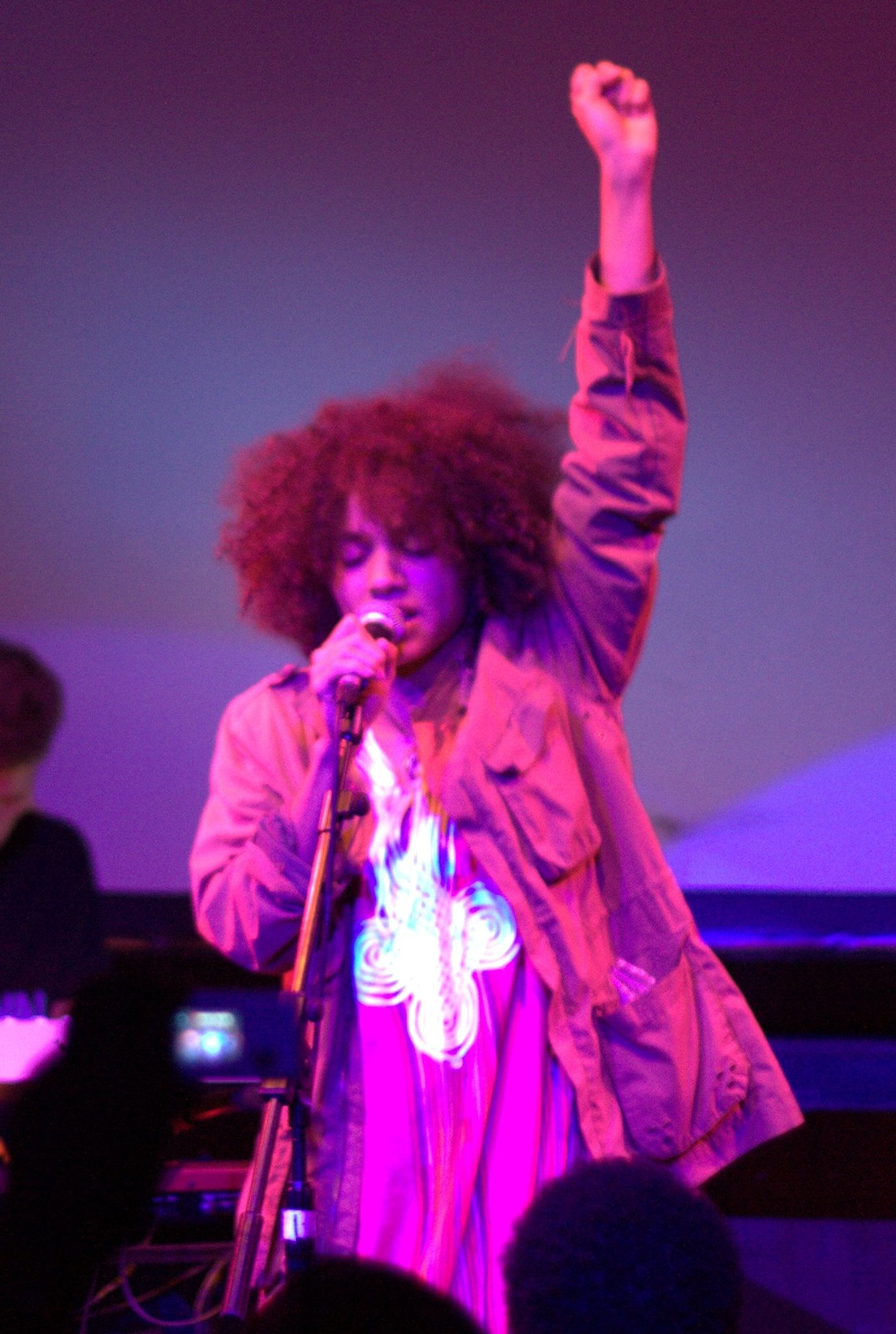
- Nneka at Cargo, London in 2009

Background information
- Born: Nneka Lucia Egbuna; 24 December 1980 (age 45)
- Origin: Warri, Nigeria
- Genres: R&B, hip hop, soul, afrobeat, reggae
- Occupations: Singer, songwriter, actress
- Instruments: Vocals, guitars, drums, piano
- Years active: 2003–present
- Labels: Yo Mama's Recording, Sony Music, Epic Records, Decon Records
- Website: www.nnekaworld.com

Nneka Lucia Egbuna (born 24 December 1980) is a Nigerian singer, songwriter and actress. She sings in English, Igbo and Nigerian Pidgin.

== Early life ==
Nneka Lucia Egbuna was born and raised in Warri, Delta State, Nigeria, to a German mother and Nigerian father. She is the youngest of four siblings. When Nneka was two years old, their German mother abandoned the family. When her father remarried, his new wife tortured and terrorized the children of the first marriage, especially the two youngest—Nneka and her brother, Anato—in an effort to make their lives intolerable.

In 1999, she relocated to Hamburg, her mother's home city. At first, she lived in a residence for asylum seekers close to the airport. Later, she moved into communal housing for youths. She learned German very quickly, and after a year and a half, she completed her high school diploma at a secondary school that had a graduation track for non-native speakers of German. After graduating from high school, she studied anthropology and African studies at the University of Hamburg, while making music on the side. Subsequently, she began performing in the underground dancehall scene in order to finance her degree.

== Career ==
=== 2003–2007: Early career and Victim of Truth ===
Nneka first gained public attention in 2004 while performing as an opening act for dancehall reggae star Sean Paul at Hamburg Stadtpark, and following much acclaim, she announced her intentions to record her first album. After releasing her debut EP, The Uncomfortable Truth, she performed on her first tour in April 2005, playing shows in Germany, Austria and Switzerland. In 2005, Nneka's debut album, Victim of Truth, was released across Europe, Nigeria and Japan. Garnering rave reviews from the media, the UK's Sunday Times later declared Victim of Truth "the year’s most criminally overlooked album". Despite universal acclaim, the record did not manage to chart. Nevertheless, Nneka enjoyed a sustained and successful period of touring, performing with label-mate Patrice Bart-Williams. During her tour, she played at Chiemsee Reggae Summer, Haarlem (Bevrijdingsfestival), The Hague (Park Pop) and Saint-Brieuc (Art Rock Festival), and in respected venues, such as La Maroquinerie and New Morning in Paris, Tivoli in Utrecht, Paradiso in Amsterdam, and Cargo and ULU in London. She has also supported artists such as Femi Kuti, Bilal, Seeed, and Gnarls Barkley.

In 2006, Nneka also performed on the German television network WDR, where she performed her single "Gypsy", while a dance group performed a dance routine they had worked on specifically for the song. The dance group was supported by the organization Schlauberger.

=== 2008- 2011: No Longer at Ease and Concrete Jungle ===
In February 2008, she released her second album, No Longer at Ease. The title of the album is taken from a novel of the same name by Chinua Achebe and reflects the lyrical content of the record. Many of the songs are political, talking about the plight of the Niger Delta and the corruption in Nneka's homeland. No Longer at Ease combines the political and the personal in "a winning mix of soul, hip-hop and reggae". The lead single from the record, "Heartbeat", became Nneka's first song to break into the German Top 50. In September 2009, the song entered the UK Singles Chart at no. 20. "Heartbeat" has since been remixed several times, most notably by Chase & Status, was sampled by Rita Ora for her chart-topping single, "R.I.P.".

In the following months, Nneka toured in France, Italy and Portugal, while she also supported Lenny Kravitz on his French tour in April 2009.

Nneka was nominated in three categories for the 2009 Channel O Music Video Awards, and won an award for Best African Act at the 2009 MOBO Awards.

In late 2009, she was chosen as of one Beyond Race Magazine's "50 Emerging Artists", resulting in a spot in the publication's No. 11 issue (with Bodega Girls and J. Cole on the cover), as well as an exclusive Q&A for the magazine's site.

In November 2009, Nneka began her first concert tour of the United States, where she performed shows in New York City, Vienna (Washington DC), Boston, Philadelphia, Los Angeles, and San Francisco. Furthermore, she was a special guest on The Roots Jam session. Her first US release, Concrete Jungle, was set for 2 February 2010, and the album charted at no. 57 on the Top R&B/Hip-Hop albums chart, and at no. 18 on the Heatseekers Albums chart, where it spent a total of five weeks.

Her track "Kangpe" is also featured as a soundtrack on EA Sports video game, FIFA 10.

In January 2010, Nneka appeared in Late Show with David Letterman in New York before getting her US tour underway, and in the following June, she won the reggae category of the Museke Online Africa Music Award 2010 with her hit song, "Africans".

Nneka toured with Nas and Damian Marley for their Distant Relatives album. Her highly rated track, "Heartbeat" was remixed with Nas, and was released via iTunes on 5 October 2010.

She participated in the 2010 Lilith Fair Concert, where artists such as Tegan & Sara, Sarah McLachlan, Kelly Clarkson, Jill Scott, Erykah Badu, Corinne Bailey Rae, Mary J. Blige, Rihanna have performed. During her US tour for Concrete Jungle, she performed also in Washington, Raleigh and Charlotte.

Nneka recorded a song for the 2010 FIFA World Cup in South Africa called "Viva Africa"; the song is a tribute to the premier mundial on African soil.

In 2010, Nneka won the award for best indigenous artist in Nigeria at the Nigerian Entertainment Awards, which was held in New York. Since then she has won the NEA award for best international artist several times.

Nneka made an appearance on the Nigerian drama film, Relentless, co-produced and directed by Andy Amadi Okoroafor; the film also featured Gideon Okeke, Halle Mordu, Jimmy Jean-Louis and Tope Oshin Ogun. Relentless was released on 13 October 2010 at the BFI London Film Festival.

In 2011, Nneka was featured alongside Ziggy Marley on the song "Express Yourself", produced for the film Beat the World.

=== 2012–present: Soul is Heavy and My Fairy Tales ===
In March 2012, she appeared on BET 106 and Park Music Matters. On the show she performed a live acoustic set with one of Nigeria's best Afro classical acoustic guitarists Clef nite and Black Thought the front man and rapper for the popular hip hop band The Roots. She also made similar appearance on MTV Iggy, with Clef nite on the second acoustic guitar.

Nneka recorded her album Soul Is Heavy in Nigeria, and the album was released in March 2012. Soul is Heavy charted in France, Austria, Germany, Switzerland, and peaked at no. 38 on the UK R&B Albums chart. The album's most successful single, "Shining Star", charted at no. 97 on the UK Singles Chart, her second and final song to do so. The record received an average critical response and was awarded a score of 70 on Metacritic.

In 2012, Nneka collaborated with American footwear and clothing brand Reebok. In May 2013, she appeared on False Idols by Tricky.

== Musical style ==
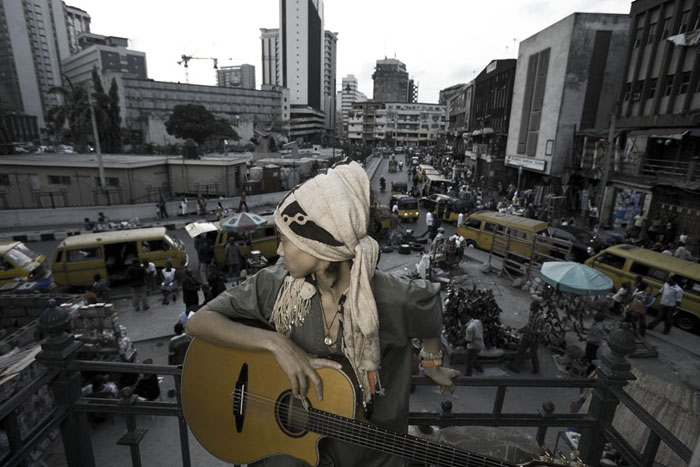
Nneka in 2010

Even though Nneka sings more than she raps, she names hip hop as her primary musical root and most important source of inspiration, while citing artists such as Fela Kuti and Bob Marley as well as contemporary rappers Mos Def, Talib Kweli, and Lauryn Hill as key influences in her own pursuit of musical recognition.

Her lyrics reflect much of her history and life in Nigeria as well as her time spent in Western Europe. Her songs stress the issues of capitalism, poverty and war and are often loaded with moral and biblical messages and references, with some music commentators comparing her to Erykah Badu, Neneh Cherry, and Floetry.

== Advocacy ==
In 2012, Nneka co-founded the Rope foundation, alongside Ahmed "Genda" Nyei. The Rope Foundation serves as a platform for young men and women to express themselves through art, and the charity also focuses on working with sexually abused women at the WAGA (War Affected Girls & Adults) Foundation, located in the Bo Town region of Sierra Leone. Nneka described The Rope Foundation as working "to give a platform to help people express themselves and their issues in society".

Nneka also serves as the Arts Ambassador for the African Women Development Fund [AWDF] in Ghana. She has worked extensively in charity and arts with the foundation in Sierra Leone.

== Discography ==
=== Albums ===
- 2005: Victim of Truth
- 2008: No Longer at Ease – Germany #31, France #34, Switzerland #42, Austria #49
- 2010: Concrete Jungle
- 2012: Soul Is Heavy – France #38, Switzerland #30, Austria #46
- 2015: My Fairy Tales
- 2022: Love Supreme

=== Compilation albums ===
- 2009: To and Fro (3-CD Boxset)
- 2009: The Madness (Onye-Ala) (with J.Period)

=== EPs ===
- 2005: The Uncomfortable Truth
- 2010: Heartbeat EP (featuring Nas)
- 2022: About Guilt

=== Singles ===
- 2005: "The Uncomfortable Truth"
- 2006: "Beautiful"
- 2006: "God of Mercy"
- 2007: "Africans"
- 2008: "Heartbeat" – #9 Portugal, #20 UK (BPI: Silver), #34 Austria, #49 Germany
- 2008: "Walking"
- 2009: "Kangpe"
- 2012: "Shining Star"
- 2012: "Soul is Heavy"
- 2012: "My Home"
- 2013: "Shining" – #7 South Africa
- 2021: “Love Supreme”
- 2021: “Tea?”
- 2021: “Yahweh”
- 2021: “This Life”
- 2021: “With You”
- 2021: “Maya”

=== Soundtracks ===
- 2011: "Beat the World"

== Filmography ==
- Lake of Fire (2004) as Chinelo
- Offside (2005) as Viva - Spielerin FC Schanze
- Relentless (2010) as Honey
- Drexciya (2012)
- Fifty (2015)
