= The Reason Why (song) =

Single by Lorenzo Fragola

from the album Lorenzo Fragola
- Released: 5 December 2014
- Genre: Pop
- Length: 3:02
- Label: Sony Music Italy
- Songwriters: Lorenzo Fragola, Michelle Lily Popovic, Fausto Cogliati
- Producer: Fausto Cogliati

Lorenzo Fragola singles chronology
| "The Reason Why" (2014) | "Siamo uguali" (2015) |

Music video
- "The Reason Why" on YouTube

"The Reason Why" is a song by Italian singer-songwriter Lorenzo Fragola, released as his debut single on 5 December 2014, during the week preceding the final of the eight season of Italian talent show X Factor, which was won by Fragola himself.

The song was written by Fragola with Michelle Lily Popovic and Fausto Cogliati. The latter also served as the song's producer.

== Background ==
Fragola started composing the song a few years before it was completed, during a summer holiday when some friends asked him to write a song as a joke while they played the guitar together. He later continued to work on the track, and he chose to perform it during the auditions for the eighth series of X Factor. On 4 December 2016, during the semi-final of the show, each contestant was required to perform a previously unreleased track, and Fragola chose to perform "The Reason Why". The following day, the song was released as a single, together with the other contestant's entries. "The Reason Why" later allowed Fragola to win the X Factor series, on 11 December 2014.

Writing for Italian magazine Panorama, Gianni Poglio described "The Reason Why", as a "pop song written to receive airplay, incisive, immediate, without being trivial". Critics including Alessandro Alicandri and la Repubblica's Anna Puricella also compared the song's sound to the work of British singer-songwriter Ed Sheeran.

== Track listing ==
- Digital download
1. "The Reason Why" – 3:02

== Charts ==
| Chart (2014–2015) | Peak position |
|---|---|
| Italy (FIMI) | 1 |

== Certifications ==
| Region | Certification | Certified units/sales |
|---|---|---|
| Italy (FIMI) | 2× Platinum | 60,000^{‡} |
^{‡} Sales+streaming figures based on certification alone.

== Release history ==
| Region | Date | Format |
|---|---|---|
| Italy | 5 December 2014 | Airplay |
| Italy | 5 December 2014 | Digital download |
