= Lambo Xtra =

Nigerian Lagos-based platform for youth culture

- Company type: Private company
- Available in: English
- Founded: Lagos, Nigeria in 2010
- Headquarters: Lagos, Nigeria.
- Country of origin: Nigeria
- Owner: theMedia 360 Company
- Founder: Soltesh Iyere (CEO)
- Industry: Music, Movies
- Website: lamboxtra.com
- Written in: PHP; JavaScript; JQuery; HTML

Lambo Xtra (formerly 9janimi Channel) is a Nigerian Lagos-based platform for youth culture, launched in 2010 by Nigerian startup theMedia 360 Company Ltd. Its primary content is Afro pop music.

== History ==
The main services are music and movie streaming. There are two subscription tiers: The Freemium (free) and Premium (paid) offerings. The service is available on Web and via mobile apps.

The channel pays royalties to artists. The service allows artists keep 75% of their songs proceeds through its Fair Trade Streaming agreement.

9janimi is a Yoruba phrase, which means "I’m a Nigerian".

9janimi Channel was established in 2010 in Lagos, Nigeria by Soltesh Iyere. To further assist in the expansion of the streaming service in Africa, they've also partnered with Bashro Beats in the United Kingdom to deliver services to Nigerians there. The Channel was formerly an online compendium of hip hop news, gossip and top-ten music charts. With singer-songwriter Halle Mordu and model Idia Aisien are its brand ambassadors.

== Awards and nominations ==
Nominated – New Media Broad Awards 2014
