= Clef nite =

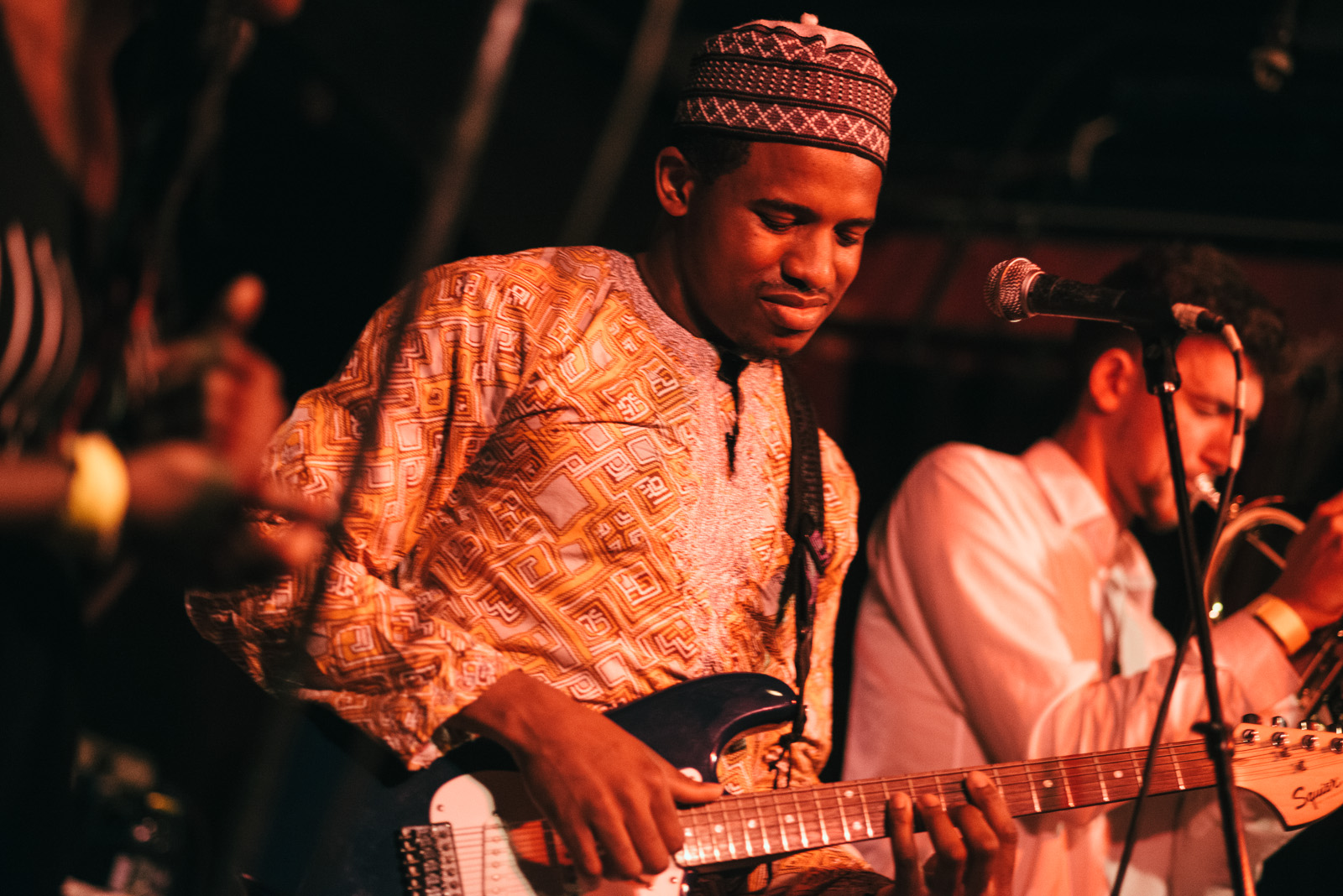
- Clef nite live at The Middle East Upstairs in Cambridge, Massachusetts. 2014

Background information
- Born: Victor Chukwunonso Nite Jnr. 4 October 1985 (age 40); Wukari, Nigeria
- Genres: Soul music, Folk music, Afropop, Pop music
- Occupations: Acoustic guitarist, performer, songwriter, music producer
- Instruments: Vocals, guitars, piano, bass and xylophone
- Years active: 1995–present
- Label: Music Republic Records Independent
- Website: clefnite.com

Victor Chukwunonso Nite Jnr. (born 4 October 1985) also known as Clef nite is a US-based Nigerian Afro-classical guitarist, performer and music producer. He is known for his percussive chord playing style on the classical guitar.

== Early life ==
Clef nite is a descendant of an art family. He is the first child of engineer Victor Nworah Nite Sr., a citizen of Nise Awka South Local Government Area in Anambra State, Nigeria who also grew up as a singer and dancer. Clef nite started loving music at a young age. He gained support from his parents to pursue music. At age 11, he joined his parents' church choir and started playing the drums. He also learned how to play the keyboard before finally resolving to play acoustic guitar.

Clef nite studied music education and classical guitar studies at the University of Nigeria, Nsukka, and enrolled at Berklee College of Music, studying contemporary writing and production with a major in voice.

== Career ==
After graduating from high school in 1999 he was admitted at University of Nigeria Nsukka to study music education and classical guitar studies. In 2005, while performing in one of his school shows, he was discovered by Abuja-based Nigerian music producer Mekoyo, who produced the hit track "Olufunmi" for Styl Plus. That year he relocated to Abuja to join him as an assistant producer at C Mountain Studios where he worked with Styl Plus as a guitarist as his first official gig. He continued to work and produce for other artists.

Later in 2008 he relocated to Lagos. He signed as a music producer with Alec's Entertainment as in-house producer and worked with popular Nigerian artists like Ruggedman and Kefee. Peter of P Square invited Clef nite to audition for him.

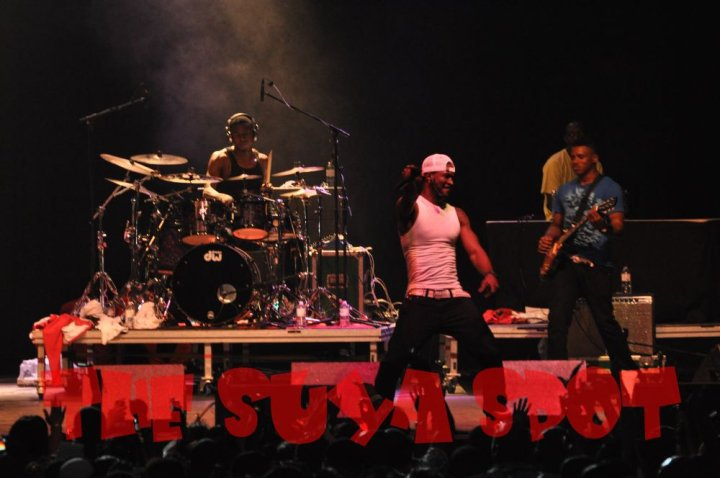
A side shot of Clef nite (Right) on the guitars with Peter (P Square) on stage performing in Canada 2010

Later in 2009, he played with P Square as they changed their style to all live band following the launch of their Danger album. He toured with the band.

In 2012 he performed with Nneka and Black Thought on BET106 & Park on the program Music Matters.

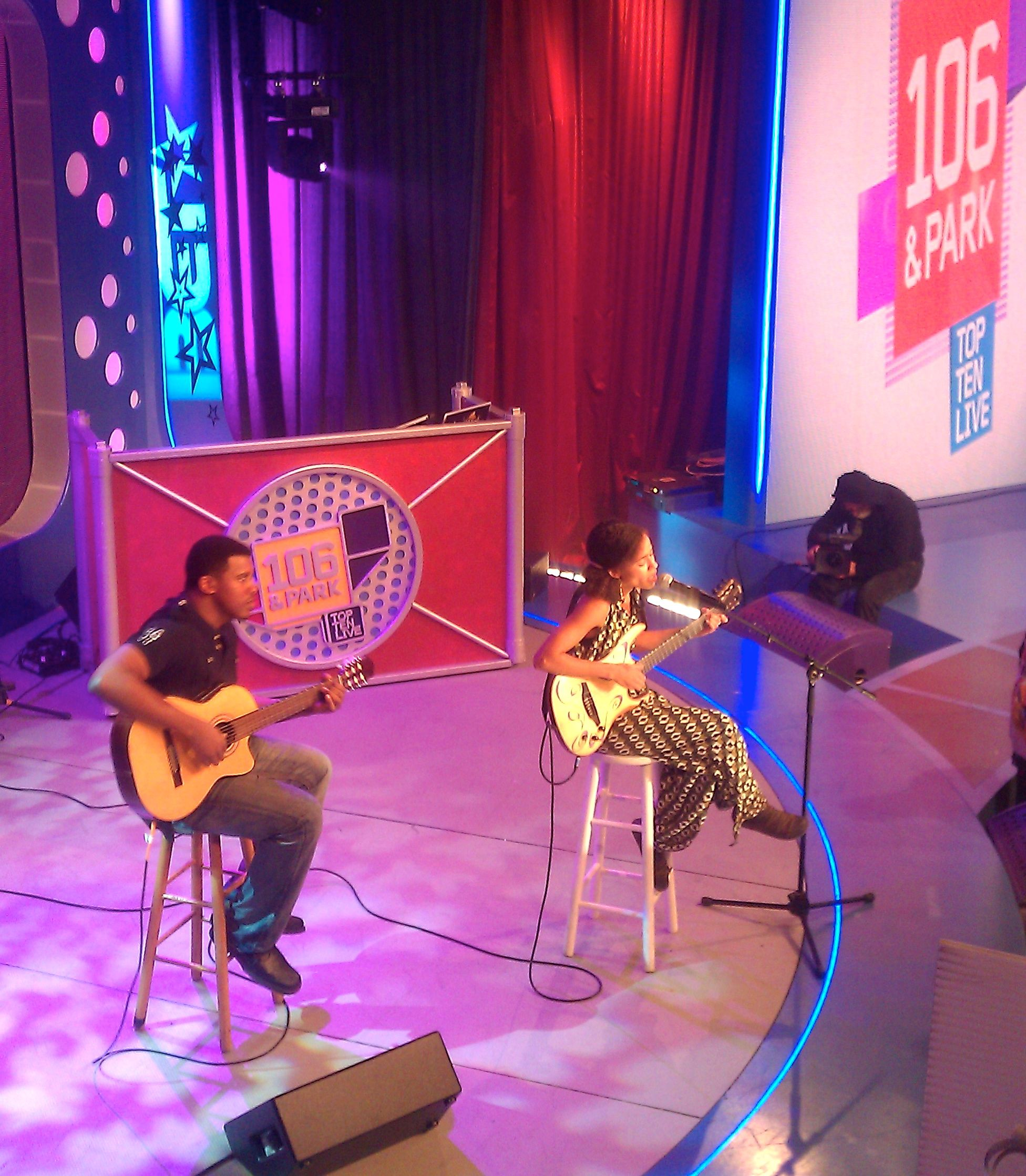
Clef nite on stage during a soundcheck with Nneka on BET 106 & Park Music Matters

Later that year, he performed with Nneka on MTV's Iggy Unplugged. These performances landed him a gig as the first Nigerian guitarist to perform live on two US TV networks.

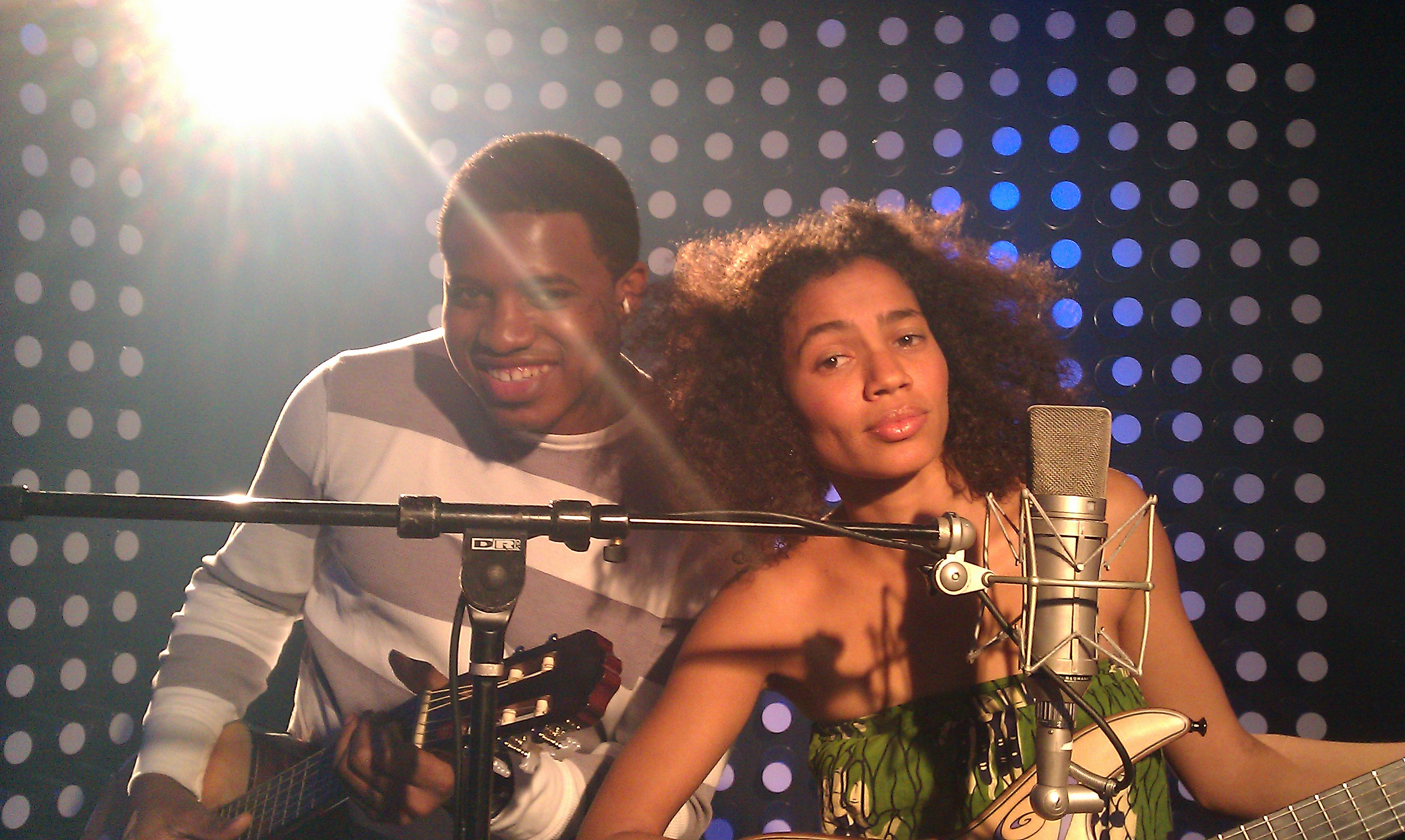
Clef nite and Nneka posing for a shot after performance on MTV Iggy Unplugged.

In the wake of the 2013 Boston Marathon bombings, Clef nite composed a tribute song for the city of Boston that he titled "Boston Song". His tribute was noted in major Boston new media such as The Boston Globe, Cambridge Day, and Patch.

Clef nite is the founder of independent production company Music Republic Records.
