= My Fairy Tales =

Studio album by Nneka
- Released: March 2, 2015
- Genre: Soul, reggae, Afrobeats
- Label: Bushqueen Music
- Producer: Mounir Maarouf, Silver Bullit, Marcus Nigsch

Nneka chronology
Soul Is Heavy (2012)	My Fairy Tales (2015)

My Fairy Tales is the fifth album by singer Nneka, released on March 2, 2015. It was her first independent release on her own label Bushqueen Music. According to Nneka, the release is "a project as opposed to a whole album". Musically there are "reggae influences as well as Afrobeats and hi-life. Lyrically, it's conscious, it's empowering and it's motivating; discussing political issues, as well as issues that affect us on a day-to-day basis".

== Track listing ==
#	Title	Length
1	"Believe System"	4:35
2	"Babylon"	4:33
3	"My Love, My Love"	3:32
4	"My Love, My Love (Reprise)"	1:44
5	"Local Champion"	3:30
6	"Surprise"	3:32
7	"Pray for You"	4:01
8	"Book of Job"	4:31
9	"In Me"	4:29

== Charts ==
Chart (2015)	Peak position
French Albums Chart	133
Swiss Albums Chart	52
