= Lorenzo Fragola =

Italian singer-songwriter (born 1995)

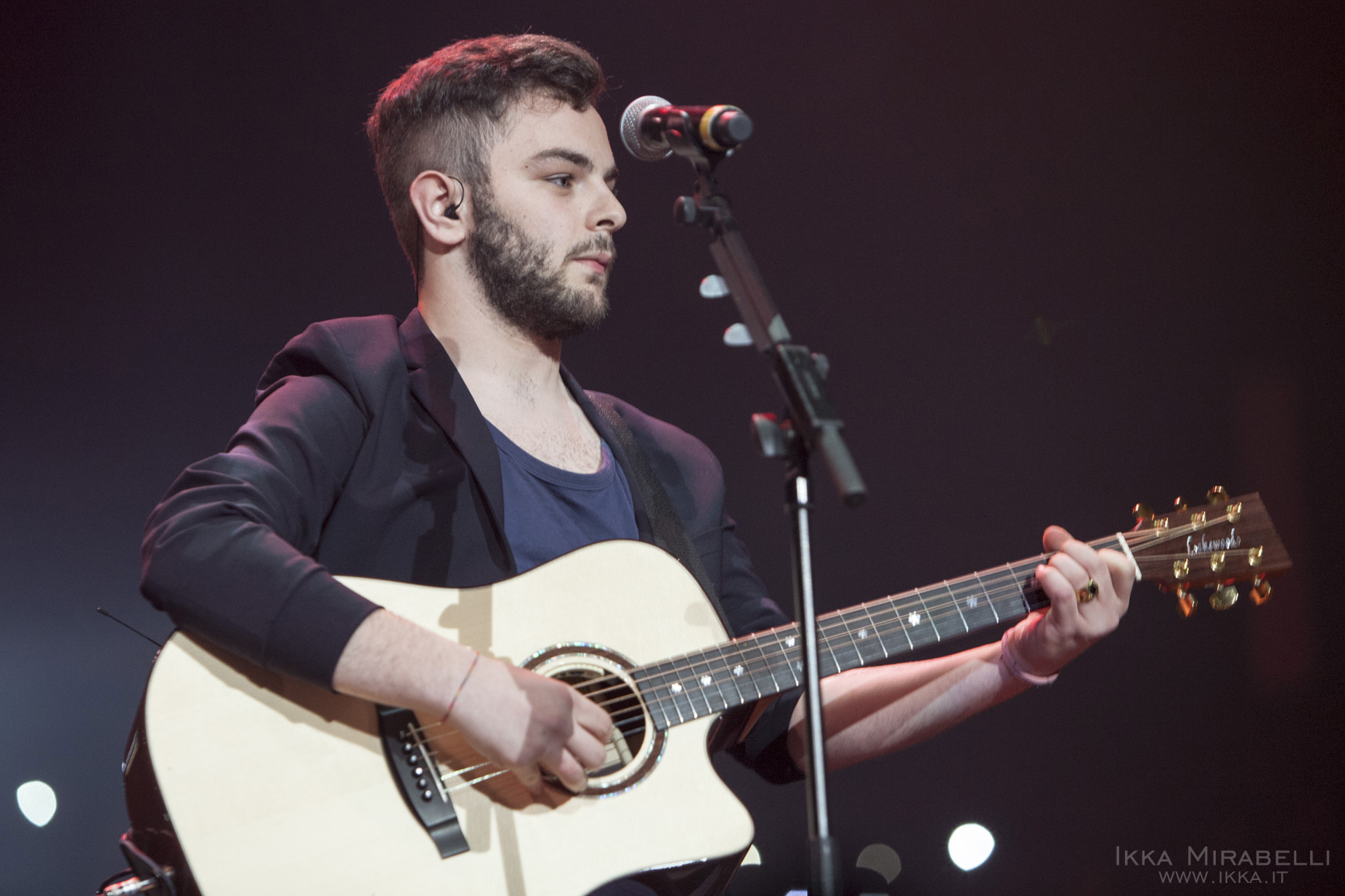

Background information
- Born: Lorenzo Fragola; 26 April 1995 (age 31); Catania, Italy
- Genres: Pop
- Occupation: Singer-songwriter
- Instruments: Vocals; piano; guitar
- Years active: 2014–present
- Labels: Sony Music; Newtopia

Lorenzo Fragola (born 26 April 1995) is an Italian singer-songwriter. He rose to fame after winning the eighth season of the Italian talent show X Factor. His winner's single, "The Reason Why", debuted atop the Italian Singles Chart, and was later certified double platinum by the Federation of the Italian Music Industry. Fragola competed both in the 65th and 66th Sanremo Music Festival, performing the songs "Siamo uguali" and "Infinite volte", and placing tenth and fifth, respectively. Both his debut album 1995, released in Italy on 31 March 2015, and its follow-up, Zero Gravity (2016) debuted atop the Italian Albums Chart.

== Biography ==
=== 1995–2012: early birds ===
Lorenzo Fragola was born in Catania, Sicily, on 26 April 1995. His parents divorced when he was three. Since then, he lived with his mother and brother. His interest in music was encouraged by his father, who plays piano. As a child, Fragola started to take music lessons, and he subsequently entered a choir. Despite writing songs since a few years, he refused to sing them to an audience until when he was 17, when he composed and performed a song for a musical based on the film Shakespeare in Love.

After completing high school, Fragola moved to Bologna, where he started studying arts, music and entertainment.

=== 2013–14: X Factor and career breakthrough ===
In 2013, he auditioned for the seventh series of the Italian talent show X Factor, but he failed to pass the first selection. He tried once again to enter the competition in 2014, when he performed Domenico Modugno's "Cosa sono le nuvole" and his own song "The Reason Why". As a result, he was chosen as one of the contestants of the eighth series of X Factor. Mentioned by Italian rapper Fedez, Fragola reached the final of the competition and, on 11 December 2014, he was announced the winner, beating runner-up Madh. His prize was a recording contract with Sony Music, with a stated value of €300,000.

During the week preceding the final of X Factor, Fragola's debut single, as well as the new song performed by the remaining semi-finalists, was released to Italian radio stations and as a digital download. Titled "The Reason Why", the song immediately achieved commercial success, reaching the top position of the Italian chart during its first week. The single was also certified double-platinum by the Federation of the Italian Music Industry, denoting sales in excess of 60,000 units. The song was later included in his self-titled EP, released by Sony Music on 12 December 2014. In December of the same year, Fragola appeared in the music video for the song "Sayonara", released by X Factor runner-up Madh. Shortly after, Fragola signed a deal with Newtopia, the recording company co-founded by his former X Factor mentor, Fedez. According to the deal, Fragola is now co-managed by Newtopia and Sony Music.

=== 2015: Sanremo Music Festival and debut album ===
In February 2015, Fragola competed in the "Big Artists" section of the 65th Sanremo Music Festival, performing the song "Siamo uguali", co-written with Fedez and Fausto Cogliati. During the contest, Fragola also performed a cover of Ron's "Una città per cantare", which is an Italian adaptation of "The road", originally recorded by Jackson Browne. After reaching the final, he finished in tenth place.

Fragola's debut album, 1995, was released on 31 March 2015. The album, composed of both Italian-language and English-language songs, includes both his previous singles, "The Reason Why" and "Siamo uguali", as well as tracks co-written by Nek, Rebecca Ferguson and Tom Odell, among the others. 1995 debuted at number one on the Italian Albums Chart. It also spawned the singles "The Rest", released in April 2015, and "#fuori c'è il sole", which became a top-ten hit in Italy during the summer of 2015. On 29 June 2015, Fragola performed a show at the PalaLottomatica in Rome, titled Fragola al cinema and broadcast live in 180 Italian theatres. The show, including Francesca Michielin, Rocco Hunt, Chiara and Nek as musical guests, was a preview of 1995 il Tour, Fragola's first Italian concert tour, which debuted in Autumn of the same year.

=== 2016: Zero Gravity ===
In February 2016, Fragola competed for the second year in a row in the Sanremo Music Festival. He performed the song "Infinite volte", which reached the fifth position in the Big Artists section. The song preceded Fragola's second studio album, Zero Gravity, which was released on 11 March 2016. The album became his second number-one on the Italian Albums Chart. It also spawned the singles "Luce che entra" and "D'improvviso", certified gold and platinum in Italy, respectively. On 21 May 2016, Fragola performed the Italian national anthem during the 68th Coppa Italia Final at the Stadio Olimpico in Rome.

== Personal life ==
In 2014, when he was selected as one of the contestants of the eighth series of X Factor, Fragola was engaged with his girlfriend, Federica Consiglio. During an interview released to the Italian edition of Vanity Fair, Fragola stated he considered himself "as if he was married to her", since the couple started living together immediately after completing high school, splitting their time between Bologna, where he was studying arts, music and entertainment, and Modena, where she studies biotechnology. However, in late December 2014, Consiglio announced through a Facebook post the couple had split on 17 December of the same year.

== Discography ==
=== Studio albums ===
List of studio albums, with chart positions and certifications
Title	Album details	Peak chart positions	Certifications
Title	Album details	ITA	Certifications
1995	Released: 31 March 2015; Label: RCA; Formats: CD, download	1	FIMI: Platinum
Zero Gravity	Released: 11 March 2016; Label: RCA; Formats: CD, download	1	FIMI: Gold
Bengala	Released: 27 April 2018; Label: Sony; Formats: CD, download	4	

=== EPs ===
List of extended plays, with selected chart positions and certifications
Title	Album details	Peak chart positions	Certifications
Title	Album details	ITA	Certifications
Lorenzo Fragola	Released: 12 December 2014; Label: Sony BMG; Formats: CD, digital download	11	

=== Singles ===
==== As lead artist ====
List of singles, with chart positions and certifications, showing year released and album name
Single	Year	Peak chart positions	Certifications	Album or EP
Single	Year	ITA	Certifications	Album or EP
"The Reason Why"	2014	1	FIMI: 2× Platinum	Lorenzo Fragola
"Siamo uguali"	2015	8	FIMI: 2× Platinum	1995
"The Rest"	2015	—		1995
"Fuori c'è il sole"	2015	5	FIMI: 3× Platinum	1995
"Infinite volte"	2016	7	FIMI: Platinum	Zero Gravity
"Luce che entra"	2016	—	FIMI: Gold	Zero Gravity
"D'improvviso"	2016	42	FIMI: 2× Platinum	Zero Gravity
"Bengala"	2018	58		Bengala
"Battaglia navale"	2018	—		Bengala
"Super Martina" (featuring Gazzelle)	2018	—		Bengala
"Solero" (featuring The Kolors)	2021	—		Non-album single
"—" denotes singles that did not chart or were not released

==== As featured artist ====
List of singles, with chart positions and certifications, showing year released and album name
Single	Year	Peak chart positions		Certifications	Album
Single	Year	ITA	SWI	Certifications	Album
"L'esercito del selfie" (Takagi & Ketra featuring Lorenzo Fragola and Arisa)	2017	4	53	FIMI: 2× Platinum	Non-album singles
"Camera con vista" (Federica Abbate featuring Lorenzo Fragola)	2019	—	—		Non-album singles
"—" denotes singles that did not chart or were not released

=== Other charted songs ===
List of non-single tracks entering the charts, with year released and album name
Song	Year	Peak chart positions	Album or EP
Song	Year	ITA	Album or EP
"Impossible"	2014	52	The Reason Why
"Cosa sono le nuvole"	2014	60	The Reason Why

=== Album appearances ===
List of other album appearances
Contribution	Year	Album
"Have Yourself a Merry Little Christmas" (with Madh, Leiner and Riccardo Schiara)	2014	X Factor Christmas 2014
"Una città per cantare"	2015	Super Sanremo 2015
"Matrioska" (Two Fingerz featuring Lorenzo Fragola)	2015	La tecnica Bukowski
"Io ti cercherò" (Ron featuring Lorenzo Fragola)	2016	La forza di dire sì
"Rimani qui" (Briga featuring Lorenzo Fragola)	2016	Talento
"Borotalco" (Mameli featuring Lorenzo Fragola)	2020	Amarcord

=== Music videos ===
Title	Year	Director(s)
"The Reason Why"	2015	Cosimo Alemà
"Siamo uguali"	2015	Mauro Russo
"The Rest"	2015	Mauro Russo
"#fuori c'è il sole"	2015	Mauro Russo
"Infinite volte"	2016	Niccolò Celaia, Antonio Usbergo
"Zero Gravity"	2016	Luca Tartaglia
"Weird"	2016	Luca Tartaglia
"D'improvviso"	2016	Luca Tartaglia
"Luce che entra"	2016	Gaetano Morbioli
"L'esercito del selfie" (Takagi & Ketra featuring Lorenzo Fragola and Arisa)	2017	Gaetano Morbioli
"Bengala"	2018	Tania Gualeni
"Battaglia navale"	2018	Niccolò Celaia, Antonio Usbergo
"Super Martina" (Lorenzo Fragola featuring Gazzelle)	2018	Niccolò Celaia, Antonio Usbergo
"Camera con vista" (Federica Abbate featuring Lorenzo Fragola)	2019	Enea Colombi

== Sanremo Music Festival entries ==
Year	Section	Song and writers	Result
2015	Big Artists	"Siamo uguali" (Lorenzo Fragola, Fedez, Fausto Cogliati)	10th place
2016	Big Artists	"Infinite volte" (Lorenzo Fragola, Rory Di Benedetto, Rosario Canale, Fabrizio Ferraguzzo, Antonio Filippelli)	5th place

== Awards and nominations ==
Year	Award	Nomination	Work	Result
2015	Nickelodeon Kids' Choice Awards	Favorite Italian Singer	Himself	Nominated
2015	MTV Italian Music Awards	Best New Artist	Himself	Won
2015	Medimex Awards	Best Debut Album	1995	Won
2016	Onstage Awards	Italian Talent of the Future	Himself	Nominated
2016	Onstage Awards	Best Fanbase	Fragola's Fans	Nominated
2016	MTV Italian Music Awards	Best Italian Male	Himself	Nominated

Awards and achievements
Preceded by Michele Bravi	Italian X Factor; Winner; 2014	Succeeded by Giò Sada
