= Heartbeat (Nneka song) =

Single by Nneka

from the album No Longer at Ease and Concrete Jungle
- B-side: "Walk the Line"
- Released: 2008
- Genre: Soul; pop
- Length: 3:11
- Label: Yo Mama's Recording
- Songwriter(s): Nneka Egbuna
- Producer(s): DJ Farhot

Nneka singles chronology
"Africans" (2007)	"Heartbeat" (2008)	"Long Distance Love" (2009)

Music video
- "Heartbeat" on YouTube

"Heartbeat" is a song by Nigerian singer Nneka. It was released in 2008 as a single from her second studio album No Longer at Ease, as well as her third studio album Concrete Jungle. A 2010 EP release of the song features American rapper Nas. The song was remixed by English electronic music duo Chase & Status and included on the "new edition" of their debut studio album, More than Alot. The remix of the song was sampled in Rita Ora's 2012 song "R.I.P.".

== Background ==
The original release of the song was written by Nneka Egbuna (Nneka) and produced by DJ Farhot, and released as a single in 2008. A music video was released to promote the single. An EP for the song was released on 5 October 2010, featuring American rapper Nas.

The song charted on release in Portugal, Germany, and Austria. In 2009, the song charted in the UK Singles Chart at position 20. The song has also charted in France and the Netherlands.

== Track listing ==
CD single (2008)
No.	Title	Length
1.	"Heartbeat"	3:11
2.	"Walk the Line"	3:12

CD single (2009)
No.	Title	Length
1.	"Heartbeat"	3:11
2.	"Heartbeat" (Chase & Status Remix)	3:56
3.	"Walk the Line"	3:12

EP (2010)
No.	Title	Length
1.	"Heartbeat" (featuring Nas)	3:51
2.	"Heartbeat" (Chase & Status Remix)	3:56
3.	"Heartbeat" (featuring Nas; Crada Remix)	3:45
4.	"Heartbeat" (VLN Remix)	5:53
5.	"Heartbeat" (Koolkojak Remix)	3:37
6.	"Heartbeat"	3:11

== Charts ==
Chart (2008–2009)	Peak position
Austria (Ö3 Austria Top 40)	34
France (SNEP)	193
Germany (GfK)	49
Netherlands (Single Top 100)	88
Portugal (AFP)	9
UK Singles (OCC)	20

== Certifications ==
Region	Certification	Certified units/sales
United Kingdom (BPI)	Silver	200,000^{‡}
^{‡} Sales+streaming figures based on certification alone.
