= Soul Is Heavy =

Studio album by Nneka
- Released: 18 March 2012
- Genre: Soul
- Label: Decon

Nneka chronology
Concrete Jungle (2010)	Soul Is Heavy (2012)	My Fairy Tales (2015)

Soul is Heavy is the fourth album by singer Nneka. It was released on 18 March 2012 in the U.K. In a 2012 interview, Nneka stated that the album is "a bit more of a “band” sound this time around, a mix of digital and organic music. Still very me, though. It deals with issues that have to do with the day-to-day life of people: corruption, false prophecies, religion, war conflict..."

== Track listing ==
#	Title	Time
1	"Lucifer (No Doubt)"	4:34
2	"Sleep" (Featuring Ms. Dynamite)	3:34
3	"My Home"	4:07
4	"Shining Star"	4:07
5	"Restless"	4:44
6	"Don't Even Think"	3:49
7	"J"	3:49
8	"Stay"	3:23
9	"Soul Is Heavy"	4:02
10	"Do You Love Me Now"	3:55
11	"Valley"	5:22
12	"V.I.P."	3:52
13	"Camouflage"	3:39
14	"God Knows Why" (Featuring Black Thought)	4:02
15	"Still I Rise" (Featuring Wura Samba & Mohammed)	3:18

== Charts ==
Chart (2012)	Peak position
German Albums Chart	65
UK R&B Albums Chart	38
