= Concrete Jungle (Nneka album) =

Studio album by Nneka
- Released: February 2, 2010
- Genre: Soul
- Label: Decon
- Producer: DJ Farhot, Jean Lamoot

Nneka chronology
No Longer at Ease (2008)	Concrete Jungle (2010)	Soul Is Heavy (2012)

Professional ratings
Review scores
Source	Rating
DJBooth.net	4/5 stars

Concrete Jungle, released in 2010, is the third album by Nigerian-German singer-songwriter Nneka - the album was her first US release.

== Track listing ==
#	Title	Time
1	"Showin' Love"	3:52
2	"The Uncomfortable Truth"	3:49
3	"Mind vs. Heart"	4:15
4	"Heartbeat"	3:11
5	"Come With Me"	5:24
6	"Kangpe" (ft. Wesley Williams)	3:59
7	"Africans"	4:29
8	"Suffri"	5:54
9	"From Africa 2 U"	3:53
10	"Walking"	3:15
11	"Focus"	4:23
12	"God of Mercy"	3:29

== Charts ==
=== Album ===
Chart (2010)	Peak Position
US Billboard Heatseekers	18
Billboard R&B/Hip-Hop Albums	57

=== Singles ===
Year	Single	Chart	Peak Position
2010	"Heartbeat"	European Hot 100	#65
