= Andy Amadi Okoroafor =

Nigerian filmmaker (born 1996)

- Born: 8 February 1966 (age 59); Bauchi, Nigeria
- Occupation(s): Director, producer, writer, art director
- Years active: 1999–present

Andy Amadi Okoroafor is a Nigerian filmmaker as well as a TED speaker. He is most notable as the director of the 2010 film Relentless. Apart from direction, he is also a writer, producer and art director. He is the founder of creative studio 'Clam'.

== Personal life ==
He was born on 8 February 1966 in Bauchi, Northern Nigeria. He was one year old when the war started in Biafra. Later he moved to Paris, France and worked as an art director in advertising, fashion and music videos. He is also a TED-Fellow.

== Career ==
In France, Okoroafor spent five years art directing music videos as well as their imagery, from the album covers to music video. He established the creative studio called 'Clam' and the 'Clam magazine' in 1999. The magazine is published two times a year in Japan, the US, Europe, and Brazil. At the 2017 exhibition, he directed the show Never Surrender, at M. Bassy in Hamburg, Germany. The show included photography and video installations in the series, More Aphrike. With the series, he collaborated with fellow photographer and filmmaker, Andrew Dosunmu.

In 2010, Okoroafor made the film Relentless, his first feature film. In October 2010, the film was selected for the London film festival, and screened on 6 December 2010 at the Africa International Film Festival in Port Harcourt for the first time in Africa.

== Filmography ==
Year	Film	Role	Genre	Ref.
2010	Relentless	Director, writer, producer	Film	
